= Halstead Dorey =

U.S. Army Major General

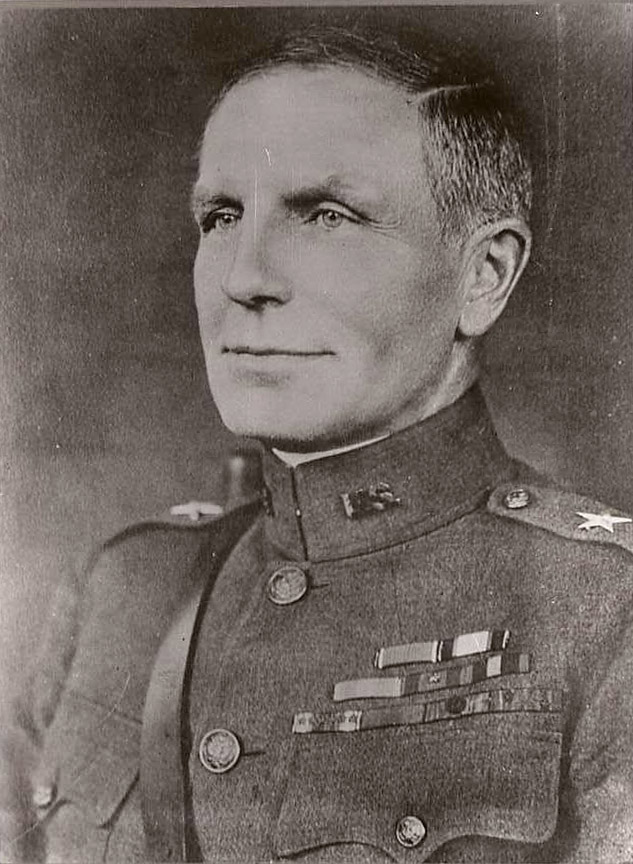
- Born: February 7, 1874; St. Louis, Missouri, US
- Died: June 19, 1946 (aged 72); San Antonio, Texas, US
- Burial place: United States Military Academy Cemetery
- Military career
- Allegiance: United States
- Branch: United States Army
- Service years: 1897–1936
- Rank: Major general
- Unit: Infantry Branch
- Commands: Hawaiian Department; Hawaiian Division; 2nd Infantry Division; 18th Infantry Brigade; 14th Infantry Brigade; 4th Infantry Regiment
- Conflicts: Spanish–American War: Battle of El Caney; Siege of Santiago; Philippine–American War; World War I: Third Battle of the Aisne; Second Battle of the Marne; Battle of Saint-Mihiel; Meuse-Argonne Offensive
- Awards: Distinguished Service Cross; Distinguished Service Medal; Silver Star (4); Purple Heart (4)

Halstead Dorey (February 7, 1874 – June 19, 1946) was a highly decorated major general in the United States Army. A graduate of West Point, Dorey distinguished himself as colonel and commanding officer of the 4th Infantry Regiment during World War I and was decorated with the Distinguished Service Cross, the second highest military award for gallantry in combat, as well as the Distinguished Service Medal.

Following the war, he was promoted to general and commanded the famed 2nd Infantry Division and the Hawaiian Department, and retired from active duty in February 1936.

== Biography ==
Halstead Dorey was born on February 7, 1874, in St. Louis, Missouri, the son of William A. Dorey and Georgiana B. Banks. Following the graduation from the Shattuck Military Academy in Faribault, Minnesota, Dorey received an appointment to the United States Military Academy at West Point, New York, in May 1893, where he excelled and was made cadet captain and battalion commander.

Among his classmates were several other future generals: Thomas Q. Ashburn, Harry G. Bishop, Albert J. Bowley, Charles H. Bridges, Sherwood A. Cheney, Edgar T. Collins, Edgar T. Conley, William D. Connor, Harley B. Ferguson, Harold B. Fiske, Frank Ross McCoy, Andrew Moses, and Charles DuVal Roberts.

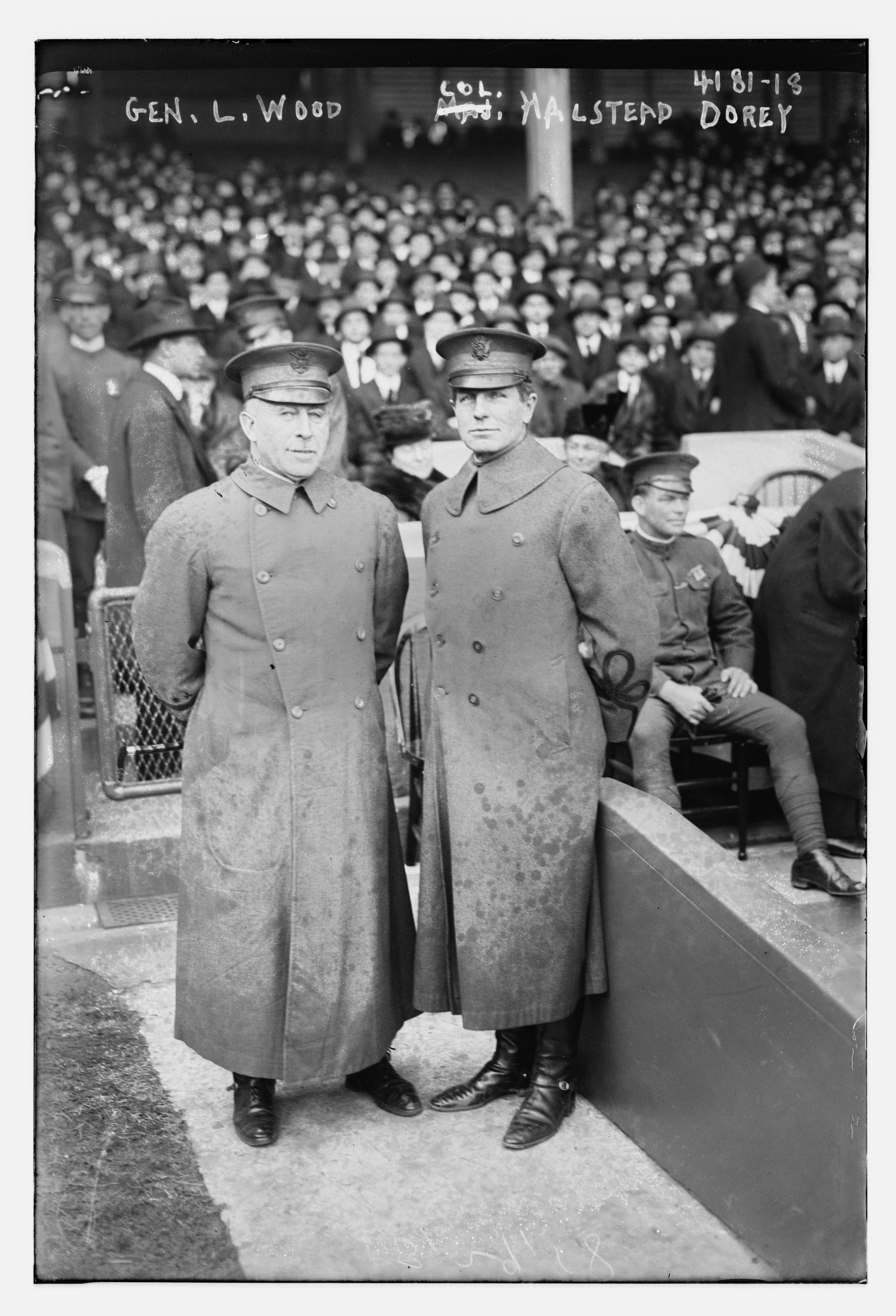
Leonard Wood and Halstead Dorey at a New York Yankees game in 1917

He graduated with Bachelor of Science degree in June 1897 and was commissioned a second lieutenant in the infantry. Dorey was subsequently assigned to the 23rd Infantry Regiment at Fort Brown, Texas, and remained there until he was transferred to the 4th Infantry Regiment.

Dorey sailed with the regiment to Cuba in April 1898 during the Spanish–American War and took part in the Battle of El Caney and Siege of Santiago in July that year. He later took part in the Philippine–American War and served as 4th Infantry Regiment's aide-de-camp in the combat operations against Moros at Zamboanga and Manila. Captain Dorey commanded the battalion of Philippine Scouts at Mindanao and was appointed aide-de-camp to Major General Leonard Wood, who served as the governor of Moro Province, a stronghold of the Muslim rebellion. Dorey was decorated with his first Silver Star for his bravery in the Philippines.

Following the United States' entry into World War I in April 1917, Dorey was appointed aide-de-camp to his former superior and now commanding general of Camp Funston, Kansas, Major General Leonard Wood. Wood was responsible for the training of nearly 40,000 men and appointed Dorey as commanding officer of the Citizens' Military Training Camp, the first businessmen's training camp at Plattsburgh, New York. He later received temporary promotion to colonel and embarked for France in early 1918. Dorey assumed duty as commanding officer of the 4th Infantry Regiment and led it for the duration of the war.

Dorey led his regiment during the defensive actions of Aisne, Château-Thierry, Second Battle of the Marne, and in the Third Battle of the Aisne, Saint-Mihiel, Meuse-Argonne offensives. He distinguished himself in the fighting north of Montfaucon on October 15, 1918, when during 12 days of continuous fighting against stubborn resistance, his regiment suffered heavy casualties. Colonel Dorey, himself suffering from a painful wound, went forward from his command post through a heavy enemy barrage to the front line, where he reorganized his forces and directed the attacking units for two days, until he was again severely wounded. His conspicuous bravery inspired his troops to the successful assault of a strongly fortified ravine and woods which were of vital importance and resulted in the capture of numerous prisoners and much material.

He remained in command of the regiment until October 20, 1918, when he was ordered to the rear for treatment. For his service with the 4th Infantry Regiment, Dorey received Distinguished Service Cross, the second highest military award for gallantry in combat, and Army Distinguished Service Medal. He was also made an officer of the Legion of Honour and was awarded the Croix de guerre with Palm by the government of France.

Following the war, Dorey graduated from the Army War College in 1921, reached the rank of brigadier general in December 1922 and commanded the 14th Infantry Brigade from January 30, 1923, to February 12, 1925, and the 18th Infantry Brigade from December 1927 to October 16, 1928. He was promoted to major general in November 1933 and assumed command of the 2nd Infantry Division the following month.

Dorey was ordered to Hawaii in June 1934 and commanded the Hawaiian Division until December 1935, with additional duty as temporary commanding general of the Hawaiian Department until March 1935. General Dorey retired from active duty on February 29, 1936, and settled at Fort Sam Houston, Texas.

Upon his retirement, Dorey was active in the Army and Navy Club and Episcopal Church.

Major General Halstead Dorey died on June 19, 1946, at Brooke General Hospital in San Antonio, Texas, and was buried at United States Military Academy Cemetery five days later.

== Decorations and medals ==
Here is the ribbon bar of General Dorey:

Distinguished Service Cross
Army Distinguished Service Medal
Silver Star with three Oak Leaf Clusters
Purple Heart with three Oak Leaf Clusters
Spanish Campaign Medal
Philippine Campaign Medal
Mexican Service Medal
World War I Victory Medal with five battle clasps
Legion of Honour, Officer
French Croix de guerre 1914–1918 with Palm

Military offices
Preceded by James C. Gowen	Commanding General, Hawaiian Division; June 2, 1934 – December 5, 1935	Succeeded by James C. Gowen
Preceded by Albert J. Bowley	Commanding General, 2nd Infantry Division; December 1933 – June 1, 1934	Succeeded by Charles Howland
