= Charles DuVal Roberts =

US Army brigadier general (1873–1966)

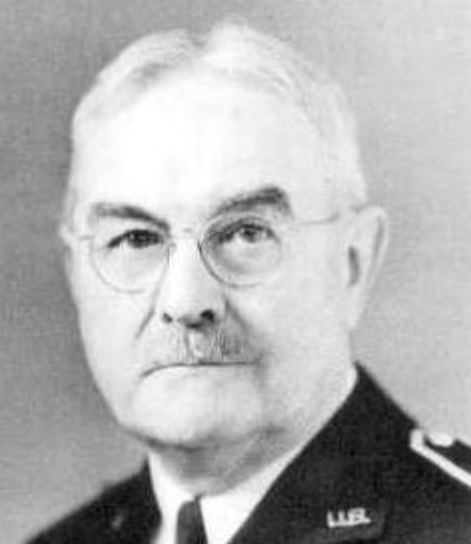
- Roberts as a brigadier general, circa 1937
- Born: June 18, 1873; Cheyenne Agency, Dakota Territory, US
- Died: October 24, 1966 (aged 93); Silver Spring, Maryland, US
- Burial place: Arlington National Cemetery
- Military career
- Allegiance: United States
- Branch: United States Army
- Service years: 1897–1937
- Rank: Brigadier General
- Unit: Infantry Branch
- Commands: Panama Canal Division; 1st Infantry Division
- Conflicts: Spanish–American War: Battle of El Caney; Siege of Santiago; Philippine–American War: Battle of Makahambus Hill; Veracruz Expedition; World War I: Battle of Saint-Mihiel; Meuse-Argonne Offensive
- Awards: Medal of Honor; Distinguished Service Medal; Croix de Guerre (France); Officer of the Order of Leopold (Belgium)

Charles DuVal Roberts (June 18, 1873 – October 24, 1966) was a highly decorated officer in the United States Army with the rank of brigadier general. He received the Medal of Honor for valor in action on July 1, 1898, near El Caney, Cuba, during Spanish–American War.

Roberts, a West Point alumni, participated in the numerous conflicts and reached the general's rank following the World War I. He commanded famous 1st Infantry Division and completed his career in 1937 as commanding general, Washington Military District.

== Early life and career ==
Roberts was born at Cheyenne Agency, South Dakota, on June 18, 1873, the son of Cyrus Swan Roberts and Nannie Rollins DuVal. His father was a distinguished Union Civil War Veteran and retired from active service as brigadier general. His mother was a daughter of United States judge Thomas H. DuVal of Austin, Texas. Young Charles spent his childhood on various U.S. Army posts on the Western Frontier and accompanied his father to Mexico during the Apache Wars 1886 expedition under Major general George Crook. The expedition resulted in the surrender of the Apache Chief, Geronimo.

Roberts followed his father footsteps and upon completing of the high school in May 1893, he received an appointed to the United States Military Academy at West Point, New York. During his time at the academy, he reached the rank of Cadet Quartermaster Sergeant and served as Hop Manager.

Among his classmates were several other future generals: Thomas Q. Ashburn, Harry G. Bishop, Albert J. Bowley, Charles H. Bridges, Sherwood A. Cheney, Edgar T. Collins, Edgar T. Conley, William D. Connor, Halstead Dorey, Harley B. Ferguson, Harold B. Fiske, Frank Ross McCoy and Andrew Moses.

Roberts graduated on June 11, 1897, with Bachelor of Science degree and was commissioned second lieutenant in the Infantry Branch. He was assigned to the 17th Infantry Regiment, the same unit, which his father joined following the Civil War. Roberts subsequently sailed with the regiment to Cuba in 1898 and took part in the combat operations during the Spanish–American War.

He distinguished himself during the Battle of El Caney on July 1, 1898, when he assisted in the rescue of the wounded from in front of the lines under heavy fire of the enemy and was decorated with the Medal of Honor, the United States of America's highest and most prestigious personal military decoration for gallantry in combat. He later took part in the Siege of Santiago few days later.

Following his return to the United States, Roberts was promoted to the temporary rank of Captain and attached to the 35th United States Volunteers. He subsequently sailed for the Philippines and took part in the combats in Northern Luzon during the Philippine–American War. While leading a six-man patrol on June 4, 1900, during Battle of Makahambus Hill, his unit was ambushed and decimated. Three men were killed and rest taken prisoner. Two wounded soldiers were released, but Roberts was kept in captivity. He was released after several months in the captivity and returned to the United States.

He returned to the United States and was attached to the Department of Texas, where he served as Judge Advocate under Brigadier general Frederick Dent Grant until he was transferred to the 7th Infantry Regiment with the regular rank of captain. Roberts served with the regiment consecutively at Fort Missoula, Montana; Fort Wayne, Michigan, and Fort William McKinley, Philippines until 1911, when he was ordered back to the United States.

Upon his return stateside, Roberts graduated with honors from the Army School of the Line and from the Command and General Staff College at Fort Leavenworth, Kansas. He then served as an Instructor with Department of Military Art and Law there until early 1914, when he rejoined 7th Infantry Regiment. Roberts then participated in the United States occupation of Veracruz in April 1914 and following his promotion to major, he was transferred to the Panama Canal Zone for service with 10th Infantry Regiment.

== World War I ==
Following the American entry into World War I in April 1917, Roberts returned to the United States, was promoted to lieutenant colonel. He was then tasked with the organization of 46th Infantry Regiment and shortly afterwards, Roberts was promoted to colonel. He then joined the staff of 81st Infantry Division under Major general Charles J. Bailey at Camp Jackson, South Carolina, and assumed duty as Divisional Chief of Staff.

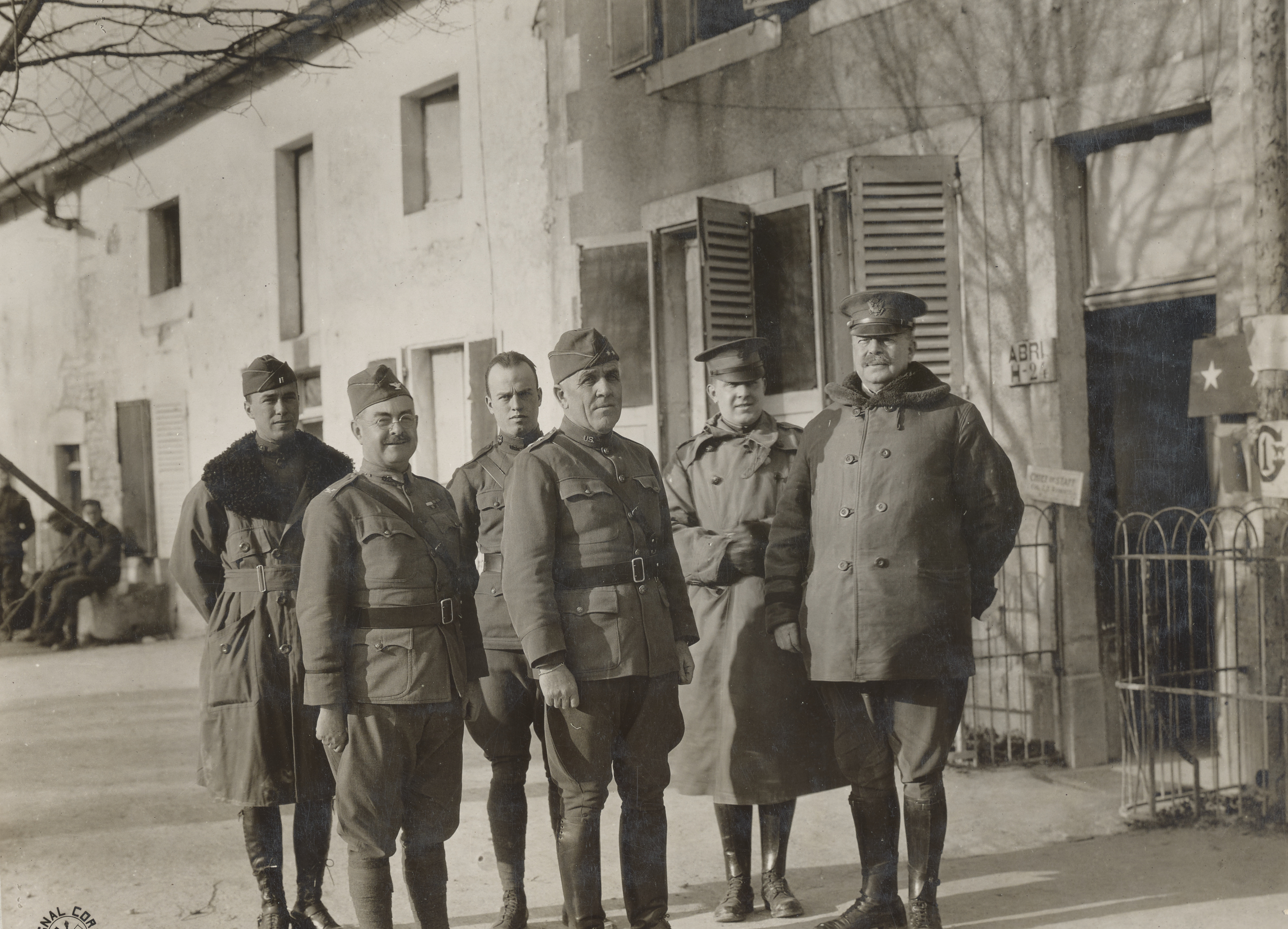
Major General Joseph T. Dickman (far right), commander of the newly created U.S. Third Army, together with Major General Charles J. Bailey, commanding the 81st Division, and Lieutenant Colonel Charles D. Roberts, the 81st's chief of staff, along with other unknown officers, pictured here at Belrupt-en-Verdunois, Meuse, France, November 11, 1918.

Roberts embarked for France in August 1918 and participated in the combat operations against German Army on the Western Front. Elements of the 81st Division first saw limited action by defending the St. Dié sector in September and early October. After relief of mission, the 81st Division was attached to the American First Army in preparation for the Meuse-Argonne Offensive. In the last days of World War I, the 81st Division attacked a portion of the German Army's defensive line on 9 November 1918, and remained engaged in combat operations until the Armistice with Germany on 11 November 1918.

Following the Armistice, the 81st Division remained in France until May 1919, when it was shipped back to the United States. For his service in France, Roberts was decorated with Army Distinguished Service Medal, French Croix de guerre 1914–1918 with Palm and Belgian Order of Leopold II, rank Officer. The citation for his Army DSM reads:

The President of the United States of America, authorized by Act of Congress, July 9, 1918, takes pleasure in presenting the Army Distinguished Service Medal to Colonel (Infantry) Charles Duval Roberts, United States Army, for exceptionally meritorious and distinguished services to the Government of the United States, in a duty of great responsibility during World War I. Colonel Roberts displayed unusual ability as Chief of Staff of the 81st Division in its organization, and in the conduct of its operations in the St. Die Sector, on 9, 10, and 11 November 1918, near Verdun, where the Division was enabled to advance some five-and-one-half kilometers over marshy ground under heavy fire.

== Postwar service ==
The 81st Division was disbanded in June 1919 and Roberts entered the Army War College in Washington, D.C., where he graduated one year later. He then served briefly in the War Department, before assumed command of 34th Infantry Regiment at Madison Barracks near Sackets Harbor, New York, in October 1921. Roberts then consecutively commanded 64th and 26th Infantry Regiments at Plattsburg Barracks, before he was appointed Professor of Military Science and Tactics at Culver Military Academy in Culver, Indiana, in October 1923.

In mid-1924, Roberts was ordered to Boston, where he was appointed Chief of Staff, First Corps Area under Major General Preston Brown. He remained in that capacity until 1927, when he was transferred to Fort Benning, Georgia and appointed Head of the Infantry Board.

Roberts was promoted to Brigadier general in February 1929 and assumed command of the 30th Artillery Brigade at Fort Eustis, Virginia. He remained in that capacity until December of that year, when he was ordered to the Panama Canal Zone and assumed duty as Commanding general, 19th Infantry Brigade. Roberts also held additional duty as Commander of the Atlantic Sector with headquarters at Gatún. He was appointed commanding general, Panama Canal Division and was responsible for the defending of the Canal Zone from potential invaders until April 1931, when he was succeeded by his West Point Classmate, Harold B. Fiske.

Upon his return to the United States, Roberts assumed command of 2nd Infantry Brigade, a part of 1st Infantry Division and held that command with his headquarters at Fort Ontario, New York until the end of March 1936. Meanwhile, in November 1935, he assumed additional duty as Commanding general, 1st Infantry Division.

He then served briefly as Commanding general of 16th Infantry Brigade in Washington, D.C., before assumed command of the Washington Military District. Roberts held that command until June 30, 1937, when he retired from active duty after 40 years of commissioned service.

== Retirement and death ==
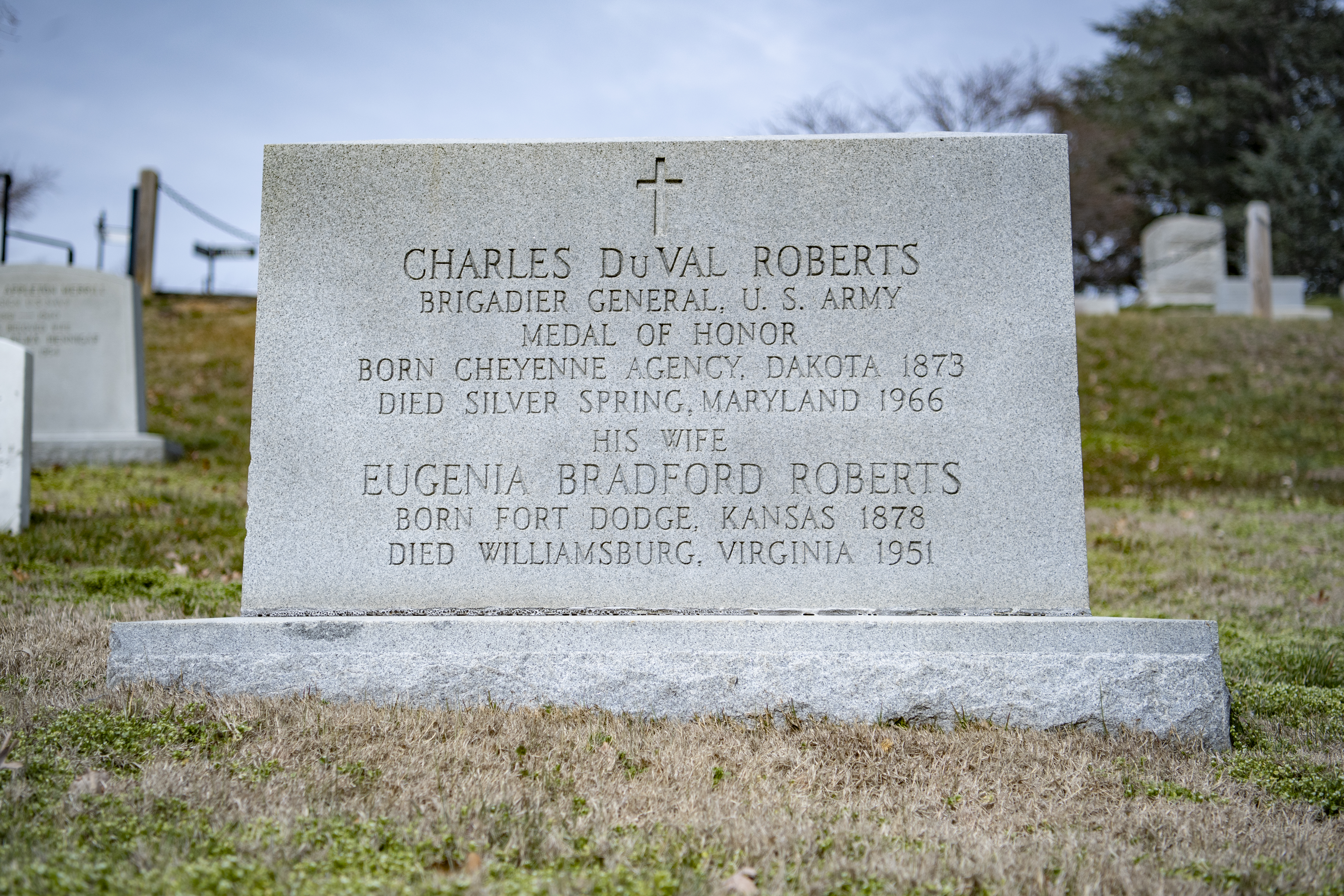
Grave at Arlington National Cemetery

Following his retirement, Roberts settled in Chevy Chase, Maryland, and was active in the Army and Navy Club. He later served as the Director, Retired Officers Association and belonged to several organizations including the Order of the Cincinnati and the Ohio Commandery of the Loyal Legion.

Roberts suffered a stroke in October 1964, which left him almost blind, and he died two years later on October 24, 1966, at the age of 93 in Silver Spring, Maryland. He was buried with full military honors at Arlington National Cemetery, Virginia, beside his wife, Mary Eugenia Bradford (1878–1951). They had two sons: Heyward B. and Thomas D., both United States Military Academy Class of 1924 and one daughter, Eugenia.

== Decorations ==
Here is Brigadier General Roberts' ribbon bar:

1st Row	Medal of Honor		Army Distinguished Service Medal	
2nd Row	Spanish Campaign Medal	Army of Cuban Occupation Medal		Philippine Campaign Medal
3rd Row	Mexican Service Medal	World War I Victory Medal with two Battle Clasps	French Croix de guerre 1914–1918 with Palm	Belgian Order of Leopold II, rank Officer

== Medal of Honor citation ==
Rank and organization: Second Lieutenant, U.S. Army, 17th U.S. Infantry. Place and date: At El Caney, Cuba, 1 July 1898. Entered service at: Fort D. A. Russell, Wyo. Birth: Fort D. A. Russell, Wyo. Date of issue: 21 June 1899.

Citation:

Gallantly assisted in the rescue of the wounded from in front of the lines under heavy fire of the enemy.

Military offices
Preceded by Lucius R. Holbrook	Commanding General, 1st Infantry Division; November 1935 – February 1936	Succeeded by Frank Parker
Preceded by George LeRoy Irwin	Commanding General, Panama Canal Division; December 21, 1930 – April 3, 1931	Succeeded by Harold B. Fiske
