= Edgar T. Collins =

U.S. Army major general (1873–1933)

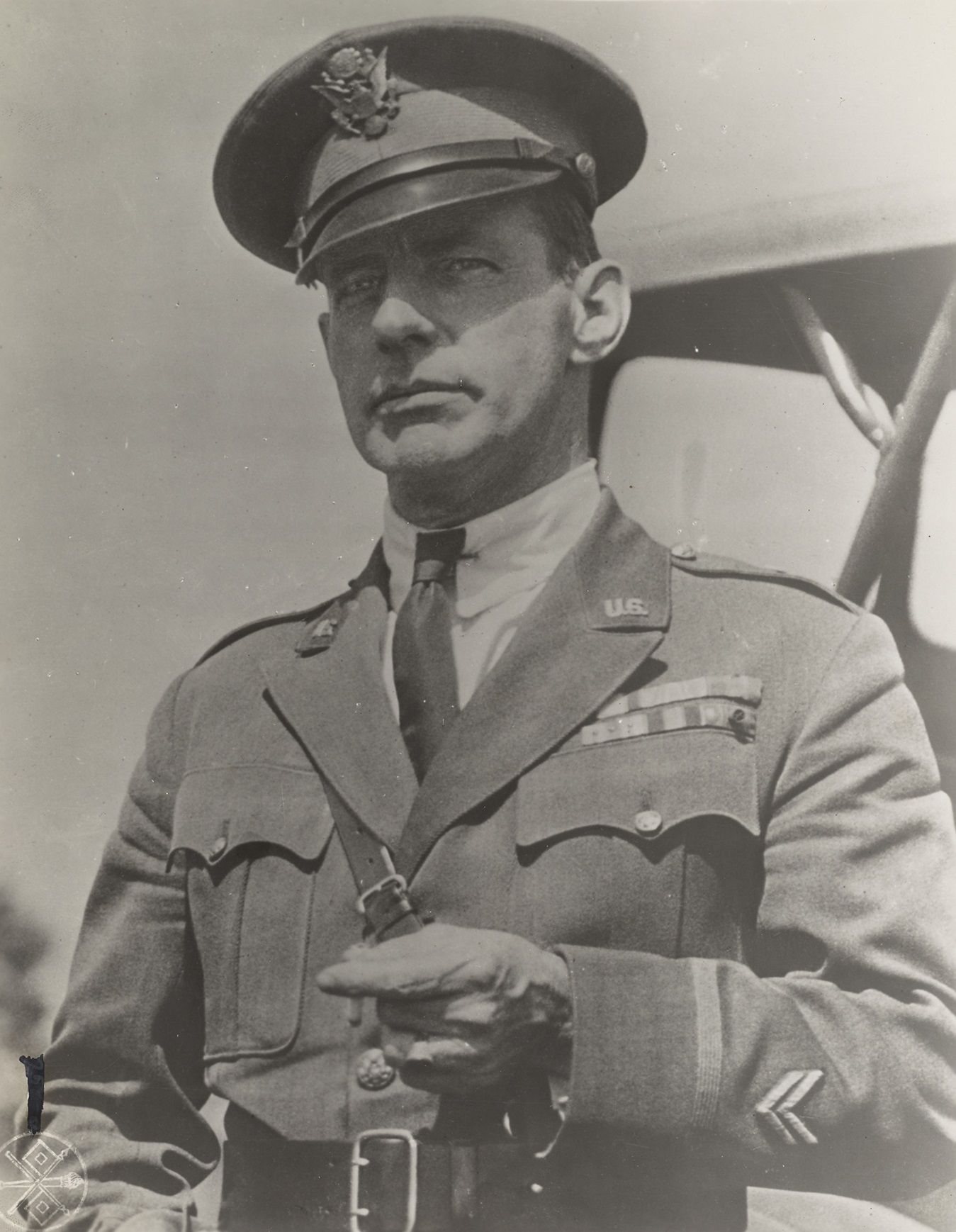
- U.S. Army Signal Corps photo of Collins in 1932. National Archives and Records Administration.
- Born: March 7, 1873; Williamsport, Pennsylvania, U.S.
- Died: February 10, 1933 (aged 59); Washington, D.C., U.S.
- Burial place: Arlington National Cemetery
- Education: United States Military Academy; United States Army Command and General Staff College; United States Army War College
- Spouse: Margaret Elizabeth Van Horn (m. 1898–1932)
- Children: 2
- Military career
- Service: United States Army
- Service years: 1897–1933
- Rank: Major General
- Service number: O573
- Unit: U.S. Army Infantry Branch
- Commands: Company H, 23rd Infantry Regiment; Company E, 8th Infantry Regiment; Company M, 6th Infantry Regiment; Company F, 10th Infantry Regiment; 2nd Provisional Training Regiment; 1st Field Artillery Brigade; United States Army Infantry School; Fort Benning; 23rd Brigade (Philippine Scouts); 16th Infantry Brigade
- Conflicts: Spanish–American War; United States Military Government in Cuba; Philippine–American War; World War I
- Awards: Army Distinguished Service Medal; Legion of Honor (Officer) (France)

Edgar T. Collins (March 7, 1873 – February 10, 1933) was a career officer in the United States Army. A veteran of the Spanish–American War, Philippine–American War, and World War I, he attained the rank of major general, and his awards included the Army Distinguished Service Medal and French Legion of Honor (Officer).

A native of Williamsport, Pennsylvania, Collins was raised and educated in Williamsport and Hepburn. In 1891, he received an appointment to the United States Military Academy at West Point. He attended from 1893 to 1897, and after graduating he received his commission as a second lieutenant of Infantry. He served in the Spanish–American War, including combat at the Battle of El Caney. He later served in the Philippines during the Philippine–American War, including command of a company during fighting on Luzon.

Collins graduated from the United States Army Command and General Staff College in 1911 and the United States Army War College in 1917. During the expansion of the army in advance of U.S. entry into World War I, Collins instructed during several Citizens' Military Training Camps (CMTC) at Plattsburgh Barracks, New York, including command of a provisional training regiment in 1917. During the First World War, Collins served as chief of staff for the 78th Division, an observer with British and French troops, chief of staff of the 85th Division, assistant chief of staff of the training section (G-5) on the staff of the American Expeditionary Forces, and chief of staff of the VI Corps.

After World War I, Collins served as chief of staff of the 1st Division, commandant of the Infantry School, and commander of Infantry and Field Artillery brigades. He was promoted to brigadier general in 1924 and major general in 1932. He was serving as the army's assistant chief of staff for operations and training, G-3 when he died at Walter Reed Army Medical Center on February 10, 1933. Collins was buried at Arlington National Cemetery.

== Early life ==
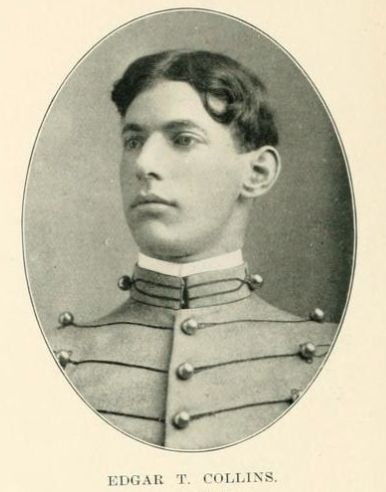
Collins as a West Point Cadet, circa 1897

Edgar Thomas Collins was born in Williamsport, Pennsylvania on March 7, 1873, a son of John Collins and Catherine (Hyde) Collins. His siblings included brother Emerson Collins, an attorney and public official, and Herman L. Collins, a columnist for The Philadelphia Inquirer. Collins was raised and educated in Williamsport and Hepburn, and attended Dickinson Seminary in Williamsport and the Lycoming County Normal School in Muncy.

In 1890, Collins was named an alternate for an appointment to the United States Military Academy at West Point. In 1891, he obtained an appointment to West Point from Congressman Albert C. Hopkins, and he began attending in 1893. He graduated in June 1897 ranked 57th of 67 and received his commission as a second lieutenant of Infantry. Among his classmates who also became general officers were Thomas Q. Ashburn, Andrew Moses, Harry Gore Bishop, Frank Ross McCoy, Harold Benjamin Fiske, Albert Jesse Bowley Sr., Harley Bascom Ferguson, Sherwood Cheney, and William Durward Connor.

== Start of career ==
Collins's initial assignment was with the 8th Infantry Regiment at Fort D. A. Russell, Wyoming. In March 1898, he was transferred to the 23rd Infantry Regiment at Fort McIntosh, Texas, where he remained until June 1898. During the Spanish–American War, he was assigned to 1st Brigade, 2nd Division, Fifth Army Corps as aide-de-camp to William Ludlow and Ordnance officer on the brigade staff. He took part in combat in Cuba, including the July 1898 Battle of El Caney and several subsequent skirmishes. After returning to the United States on sick leave in August, in December he rejoined the 23rd Infantry in Cuba as commander of its Company H. In March 1899, he was promoted to first lieutenant and in April 1899, he transferred to the 8th Infantry.

From May 1899 to January 1900, Collins performed recruiting duty in Philadelphia. From January to July 1900, he was posted to Columbia Barracks near Havana, where he served with the 8th Infantry during the United States Military Government in Cuba. He served with his regiment at Fort Snelling, Minnesota from July to September 1900, then departed for the Philippines, where he took part in several skirmishes on Luzon during the Philippine–American War. From October 1900 to December 1901, he commanded Company E, 8th Infantry, and he was adjutant of the 8th Infantry's 2nd Battalion from June 1901 to May 1902. In May 1902, he was promoted to captain in the 6th Infantry Regiment.

After returning to the United States, Collins commanded the 6th Infantry's Company M at Fort Leavenworth, Kansas. In May 1905, he was appointed regimental quartermaster and served again in the Philippines, this time at Camp Bumpus near Tacloban. From March to October 1906, he was assigned to duty in Zamboanga City. When he returned to the United States in late 1906, Collins was assigned to duty with the 6th Infantry at Fort William Henry Harrison, Montana.

== Continued career ==
From March 1909 to June 1910, Collins was posted to Fort Leavenworth to attend the Army School of the Line, which he completed as an honor graduate. He was then enrolled as a student at the United States Army Command and General Staff College, from which he graduated in June 1911. He was then assigned as inspector and instructor for the Wisconsin National Guard, where he remained until October 1912. Collins's next posting was with the 6th Infantry at the Presidio of San Francisco, where he served until June 1913, when he was transferred to the 10th Infantry Regiment at Camp Otis, Panama Canal Zone. Collins commanded Company F, 10th Infantry in Panama until May 1916, in addition to performing temporary staff duty with the Citizens' Military Training Camp (CMTC) at Plattsburgh Barracks, New York in the summer of 1915. Collins served at the Plattsburgh training camp again in 1916, and was promoted to major in July.

From September 1916 to April 1917, Collins was a student at the United States Army War College. After graduating, he returned to Plattsburgh, this time as commander and senior instructor of the 2nd Provisional Training Regiment. In August 1917, he was promoted to temporary lieutenant colonel and assigned to duty on the staff at the United States Department of War. In November 1917, he was assigned as chief of staff of the 78th Division during its initial organization and training at Camp Dix, New Jersey. He remained with the division until November 1917, when he departed for duty in France. He remained in France as an observer until February 1918, and took part in combat with the French 15th Division and British 32nd Division.

Upon his return to the United States, he was promoted to temporary colonel as chief of staff of the 85th Division during its training and organization at Camp Custer, Michigan. After the division arrived in France in August 1918, Collins was assigned to the training section (G-5) on the staff of the American Expeditionary Forces. He took part in the Battle of Saint-Mihiel and Meuse–Argonne offensive, and remained on the AEF staff until October 1918, when he was named chief of staff of VI Corps. He remained in this post through the end of the war in November.

== Later career and death ==
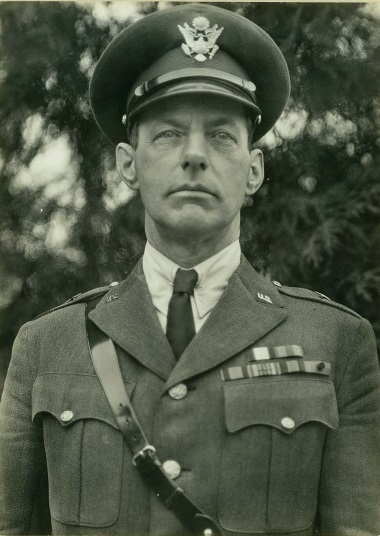
Collins as commandant of the Infantry School, circa 1928

Collins remained on duty in Europe during the Occupation of the Rhineland, and served on the AEF's Infantry Board, which considered wartime lessons learned and developed recommendations for future equipment, weapons, and training. In May 1919, he returned to the United States and was assigned to the faculty of the Army War College. He was reduced to his permanent rank of lieutenant colonel in August 1919, and promoted again to colonel in July 1920.

In January 1921, Collins was posted to Camp Dix as chief of staff of the 1st Division. From September 1921 to June 1924, he served again on the War Department General Staff. He was then a student in two special courses for senior officers, first at the Fort Benning, Georgia Infantry School, then at the Fort Sill, Oklahoma Field Artillery School. He was promoted to brigadier general in November 1924, and in February 1925 he was assigned to command the 1st Field Artillery Brigade at Fort Hoyle, Maryland. In March 1926, Collins was assigned as commandant of the Infantry School and commander of the Fort Benning post.

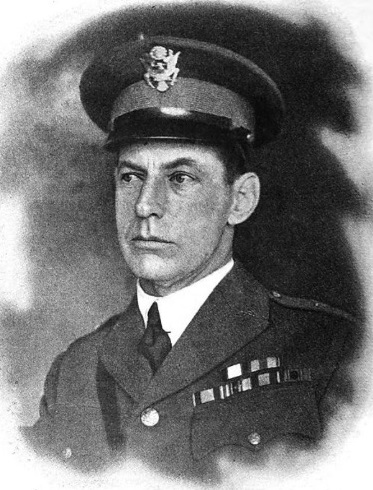
Stylized likeness of Collins as Infantry School commandant

In May 1929, Collins was assigned to command the 23rd Brigade (Philippine Scouts) at Fort William McKinley, Philippines. In October 1930, he was assigned to command the 16th Infantry Brigade (now the Military District of Washington). Collins returned to the General Staff in February 1932 as the army's assistant chief of staff for operations and training, G-3. In June 1932, he was promoted to major general.

Collins died at Walter Reed Army Medical Center in Washington, D.C. on February 10, 1933. His funeral took place at the Fort Myer chapel, and was conducted by Julian E. Yates, the army's Chief of Chaplains. Honorary pallbearers included Douglas MacArthur, George Van Horn Moseley, Robert Emmet Callan, John W. Gulick, and Andrew Moses. He was buried at Arlington National Cemetery.

== Awards ==
Collins was a recipient of the Army Distinguished Service Medal for his performance of duty during World War I. In addition, he received the French Legion of Honor (Officer) to recognize his First World War service.

=== Distinguished Service Medal citation ===
"The President of the United States of America, authorized by Act of Congress, July 9, 1918, takes pleasure in presenting the Army Distinguished Service Medal to Colonel (Infantry) Edgar Thomas Collins, United States Army, for exceptionally meritorious and distinguished services to the Government of the United States, in a duty of great responsibility during World War I. As Assistant to G-5, General Headquarters, and later as Chief of Staff of the 6th Army Corps, Colonel Collins demonstrated rare military attainments, performing his difficult tasks with unremitting zeal, rendering services of conspicuous worth to the American Expeditionary Forces."

Service: Army Rank: Colonel Division: 6th Army Corps, American Expeditionary Forces General Orders: War Department, General Orders No. 16 (1920)

=== Legacy ===
USS General E. T. Collins, a World War II era transport ship, was named for Collins.

== Family ==
In 1898, Collins married Margaret Elizabeth Van Horn, the daughter of Colonel James Judson Van Horn. They were the parents of two daughters, Mary Elizabeth and Margaret Katherine. Mary Elizabeth Collins was the wife of Major General Allison J. Barnett.

== Effective dates of promotion ==
- Second Lieutenant, June 11, 1897
- First Lieutenant, March 2, 1899
- Captain, May 28, 1902
- Major, July 1, 1916
- Lieutenant Colonel (National Army), August 17, 1917
- Colonel (National Army), February 6, 1918
- Lieutenant Colonel, August 31, 1919
- Colonel, July 1, 1920
- Brigadier General, November 3, 1924
- Major General, June 1, 1932
