= Panama Canal Division =

United States Army unit (1921-1932)

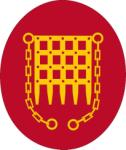
- Active: 1921–1932
- Country: United States
- Branch: United States Army
- Part of: Panama Canal Department

The Panama Canal Division was a unit of the United States Army, established in order to ensure the United States could adequately defend the Canal Zone in Panama. When it was authorized in 1920, similar divisions were organized to defend Hawaii and the Philippines.

== History ==
The Panama Canal Division was organized in 1921, and was active until 1932. Its initial composition included the 19th Infantry Brigade commanding the (14th and 65th Infantry Regiments, of which the 65th was stationed in Puerto Rico) and the 20th Infantry Brigade commanding the (33rd and 42nd Infantry Regiments). The 19th and 20th Infantry Brigades were the Regular Army elements of the World War I 10th Infantry Division that had been a part of the National Army and was demobilized in 1919. The two brigades appear to have been active until 1927.

The commander of the Panama Canal Department, Major General Preston Brown, later determined that the defense of Panama would be better served by command groups representing the Atlantic and the Pacific. In 1932, the Army inactivated the division, keeping its Tables of Organization on file should the need arise to reactivate it. It never has.

== Commanding generals ==
=== Panama Canal Division ===
- BG Edwin B. Babbitt: July 3, 1921 – October 10, 1921
- MG Samuel D. Sturgis Jr.: October 10, 1921 – April 17, 1923
- MG Edwin B. Babbitt: April 17, 1923 – September 15, 1923
- MG William Lassiter: October 1923 – September 19, 1924
- BG Fox Conner: September 19, 1924 – January 1925
- MG Charles H. Martin: January 23, 1925 – October 10, 1926
- MG William S. Graves: December 13, 1926 – October 1, 1927
- MG Malin Craig: October 13, 1927 – March 31, 1928
- MG George LeRoy Irwin: April 1, 1928 – December 21, 1930
- BG Charles DuVal Roberts: December 21, 1930 – April 3, 1931
- BG Harold B. Fiske: April 3, 1931 – April 15, 1932

=== Panama Mobile Force ===
- MG Ben Lear: February 16, 1940 – September 20, 1940
- MG Walter E. Prosser: September 21, 1940 – March 1942
- MG Robert H. Lewis: March 1942 – December 21, 1942
- MG Harry C. Ingles: December 22, 1942 - February 1943
- BG Jesse C. Drain: February 1943 - April 2, 1943
- MG Edwin F. Harding: March 26, 1943 – August 19, 1944
- MG Philip E. Gallagher: September 3, 1944 – April 1, 1945
- BG Thomas J. Camp

== See also ==
- Divisions of the United States Army
- List of former United States military installations in Panama
