= Thomas S. Timberman =

US Army major general (1900–1989)

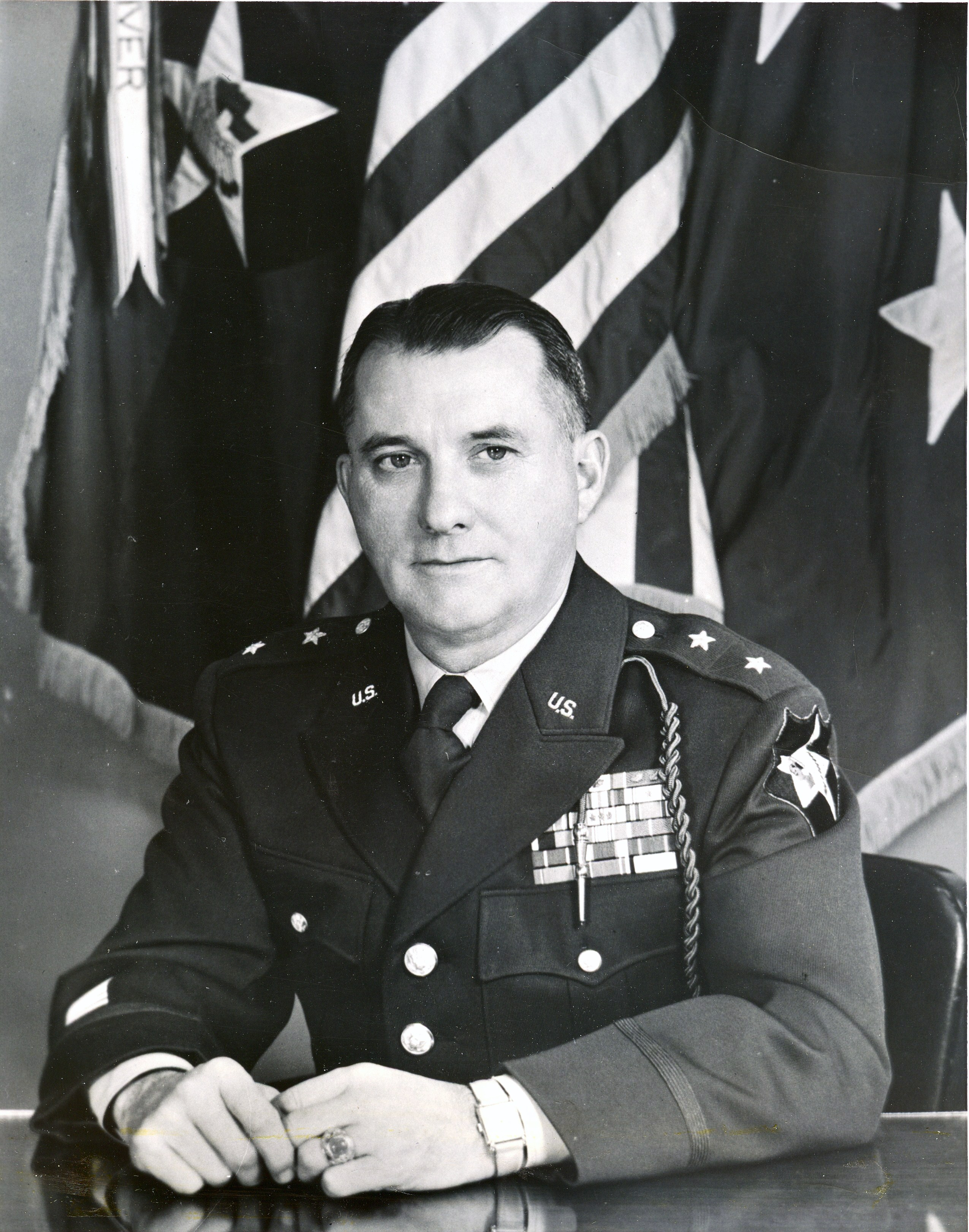
- Timberman as commander of the 2nd Infantry Division in 1954
- Born: 21 March 1900; Jamesburg, New Jersey, US
- Died: 2 August 1989 (aged 89); Bethesda, Maryland, US
- Burial place: Arlington National Cemetery
- Alma mater: United States Military Academy; United States Army Command and General Staff College
- Spouse: Virginia Charlotte Fiske (m. 1929–1983)
- Children: 2
- Relatives: Harold Benjamin Fiske (father-in-law)
- Military career
- Service: United States Army
- Service years: 1918; 1923–1960
- Rank: Major General
- Service number: O-15328
- Units: Student Army Training Corps; US Army Infantry Branch
- Commands: Company G, 30th Infantry Regiment; Provisional Company, Golden Gate International Exposition; Asiatic Theater Operations Section, War Plans Division, U.S. Department of War; Z Forces, China Burma India theater; US Forces, South East Asia Command; 1st Infantry Division; American Sector of Berlin; 2nd Infantry Division; United States Army Security Agency
- Wars: World War I World War II; Cold War; Korean War
- Awards: Army Distinguished Service Medal (3); Legion of Merit (3)
- Other work: Consultant, Research Analysis Corporation

Thomas S. Timberman (21 March 1900 – 2 August 1989) was a career officer in the United States Army. A veteran of World War II, he attained the rank of major general, and his commands included the 1st Infantry Division, 2nd Infantry Division, and United States Army Security Agency. Timberman's decorations included multiple awards of the Army Distinguished Service Medal and Legion of Merit.

A native of Jamesburg, New Jersey, Timberman was raised and educated in Jamesburg. He attended Rutgers University during World War I and joined the Student Army Training Corps, but the war ended a few months after he joined, so he was discharged in December 1918. He received an appointment to the United States Military Academy at West Point in 1919. After graduating in 1923, he began his career in the Infantry. Timberman's early assignments included aide-de-camp to Harold Benjamin Fiske, whose daughter he married in 1929. He also served in China and became proficient in the Chinese language. During World War II, he served in command and staff assignments in the China Burma India theater (CBI) and South East Asia Command.

After the Second World War, Timberman was part of the Marshall Mission that unsuccessfully attempted to prevent a communist takeover of China by creating a post-war unity government. He went on to command the 1st Infantry Division and the American Sector of Berlin during the Cold War. In 1950, he was an army representative on the joint State and Defense committee that did the initial planning and coordination of the U.S. response at the beginning of the Korean War. Later assignments included command of the 2nd Infantry Division, member of the Joint Strategic Survey Committee, and command of the United States Army Security Agency.

After retiring, Timberman was a consultant for the Research Analysis Corporation, a government-funded enterprise that conducted data analysis and operations research to understand issues of concern to the army and develop solutions. He resided in Chevy Chase, Maryland and died in Bethesda, Maryland on 2 August 1989. Timberman was buried at Arlington National Cemetery.

== Early life ==
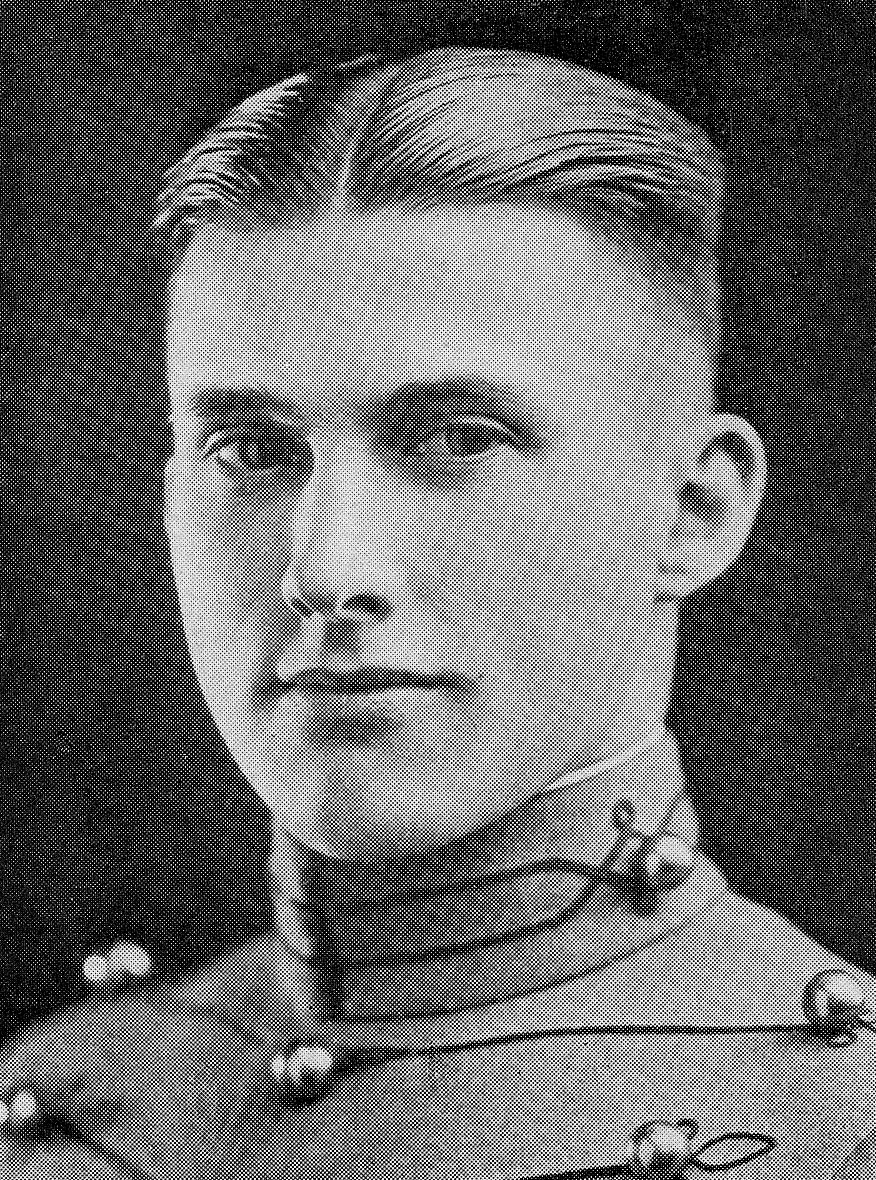
Timberman at West Point c. 1923

Thomas Sherman Timberman was born in Jamesburg, New Jersey on 21 March 1900, a son of Alvah B. Timberman and Anne B. (Flanagan) Timberman. He was raised and educated in Jamesburg, and was a 1918 graduate of Jamesburg High School. During World War I, Timberman attended Rutgers University and joined the Student Army Training Corps as a private. The Armistice of November 11, 1918 ended the war while Timberman was still in college, and he received his discharge from the SATC in December.

In 1919, Timberman received an appointment to the United States Military Academy (West Point) from Congressman Thomas J. Scully. He graduated in 1923 ranked 213 of 261 and received his commission as a second lieutenant of Infantry. Among his classmates who also attained general officer rank were Hoyt Vandenberg, who served as Chief of Staff of the United States Air Force, and Royal B. Lord, a primary planner for the Services of Supply in Europe during the Second World War.

== Start of career ==
After receiving his commission, Timberman was assigned to the 5th Infantry Regiment and posted to Fort Williams, Maine. In 1924, he performed temporary duty at Camp Perry, Ohio, where he coached and trained the Citizens' Military Training Camp rifle team in advance of that year's marksmanship competition. He attended the Chemical school at Edgewood Arsenal, Maryland from March to May 1924, then rejoined the 5th Infantry in Maine. From April 1925 to June 1928, Timberman served with the 15th Infantry in Tianjin, China. He was promoted to first lieutenant in August 1928 and served as aide-de-camp to Harold Benjamin Fiske, commander of the 2nd Division's 4th Brigade at Fort Sam Houston, Texas. When Fiske was transferred to the staff of the Fourth Corps Area at Fort McPherson, Georgia, Timberman continued to serve as his aide.

=== Military education ===
In addition to graduating from West Point, Timberman completed the officer's course at the Chemical Warfare School in 1924. In 1931, he graduated from the officer's course at the Infantry School. Timberman was a 1940 graduate of the United States Army Command and General Staff College. In 1949, his World War II experience resulted in the award of equivalent credit for completion of the National War College program of instruction.

=== Family ===
In 1929, Timberman married Virginia Charlotte Fiske, the daughter of Major General Harold Benjamin Fiske. She died in 1983 and they were the parents of daughter Virginia and son Thomas.

== Continued career ==
From September 1930 to June 1931, was posted to the Infantry School at Fort Benning. After completing the officers' course, Timberman was assigned to Beijing, where he was a student in the 15th Infantry Regiment's Chinese language course. From April to November 1935, he was assigned to the Panama Canal Department, where he served as aide-de-camp to Fiske, who was the department commander. In November 1935, he was assigned to the Presidio of San Francisco, where he commanded Company G of the 30th Infantry Regiment. At the same time, he also served as public relations officer for the Ninth Corps Area and assistant to the corps area's assistant chief of staff for Intelligence (G-2). In January and February 1938, he was a student in the Mess Management Course taught at the Presidio's School for Bakers and Cooks. From October 1938 to March 1939, he commanded a provisional company during the Golden Gate International Exposition, an event held to celebrate the completion of the San Francisco–Oakland Bay Bridge and Golden Gate Bridge.

Timberman attended the staff college at Fort Leavenworth, Kansas from September 1939 to February 1940. With the army expanding and ramping up training in anticipation of American entry into World War II, from February to May 1940, he performed temporary duty with the 10th Infantry Regiment at Camp Beauregard, Louisiana. In June 1940, he was assigned as an instructor at the Infantry School. From August to October 1941, Timberman performed temporary duty in England as an observer of the British Army's commando and assault training course, after which he returned to the Infantry School to teach antitank and mortar weapons and tactics. In January 1942, Timberman was assigned to the general staff of the United States Department of War, where he joined the War Plans Division as chief of the Asiatic Theater Operations Section. While at the War Department, Timberman was among the staff planners and briefers who organized the First Quebec Conference of August 1943, the Cairo Conference of November 1943, and the Second Cairo Conference of December 1943.

== Later career ==
In January 1944, Timberman was promoted to temporary brigadier general and assigned to the China Burma India theater (CBI). From February to May 1944, he served as the U.S. representative at the South East Asia Command (SEAC) headquarters in New Delhi. In June and July 1944, he was deputy chief of staff to CBI commander Joseph Stilwell. From August to December 1944, Timber commanded the Z Forces, a combat formation of Chinese and American soldiers based in the southern China city of Kweilin. From December 1944 to March 1946, he commanded US forces in the South East Asia Command, served as the U.S. representative to the SEAC headquarters, now based in Kandy, Ceylon, and was deputy to successive SEAC commanders Daniel Isom Sultan and Raymond Albert Wheeler.

From March 1946 to September 1947, Timberman served in Beijing as executive officer of the Marshall Mission, the US diplomatic effort headed by General George C. Marshall that negotiated with the Chinese Communist Party and Chinese Nationalists (the Kuomintang) to create a unified Chinese government. Upon returning to the United States, he served on the staff of the army's assistant chief of staff for operations (G-3). In June 1950, he was one of the army's representatives on a combined State and Defense panel that planned and coordinated the initial U.S. response at the start of the Korean War. From July 1951 to December 1952, Timberman performed Cold War duty as commander the 1st Infantry Division in West Germany. From January 1953 to August 1954, he was assigned as commander of the American Sector of Berlin, which included the East German uprising of 1953. From September 1954 to August 1955, Timberman was posted to Fort Lewis, Washington as commander of the 2nd Infantry Division. From 1955 to 1958, he was a member of the Joint Strategic Survey Committee, a panel that provided long range planning and recommendations to the Joint Chiefs of Staff. from July 1958 until his March 1960 retirement, Timberman commanded the United States Army Security Agency.

After retiring from the army, Timberman worked as a consultant for the Research Analysis Corporation(RAC), an organization funded by the army as the successor to the Operations Research Office. RAC conducted operations research and data analysis in a scientific effort to identify issues and concerns that prevented or hindered US military mission accomplishment and develop solutions. In retirement, Timberman resided in Chevy Chase, Maryland. He died in Bethesda, Maryland on 2 August 1989. He was buried at Arlington National Cemetery.

== Awards ==
Among Timberman's decorations were the Army Distinguished Service Medal with two oak leaf clusters and the Legion of Merit with two oak leaf clusters. For his wartime service, he received the Order of the British Empire (Commander) and the Order of the White Elephant (Knight Commander) (Siam). In addition, Timberman was a recipient of the Order of the Cloud and Banner (Special Collar), Order of the Sacred Tripod (Special Collar), and Order of the Sacred Tripod (Special Breast) from the Republic of China.

== Dates of rank ==
- Private, 18 October 1918 to 14 December 1918
- Cadet, United States Military Academy, 13 June 1919 to 11 June 1923
- Second Lieutenant, 12 June 1923
- First Lieutenant, 4 August 1928
- Captain, 1 August 1935
- Major, 1 July 1940
- Lieutenant Colonel (Army of the United States), 24 December 1941
- Lieutenant Colonel, 6 June 1942
- Colonel (Army of the United States), 29 June 1942
- Brigadier General (Army of the United States), 18 January 1944
- Colonel, 11 March 1948
- Major General (Army of the United States), 13 September 1951
- Brigadier General, 11 March 1953
- Major General, 21 August 1953
- Major General (Retired), 1 April 1960
