= Panama Canal Department =

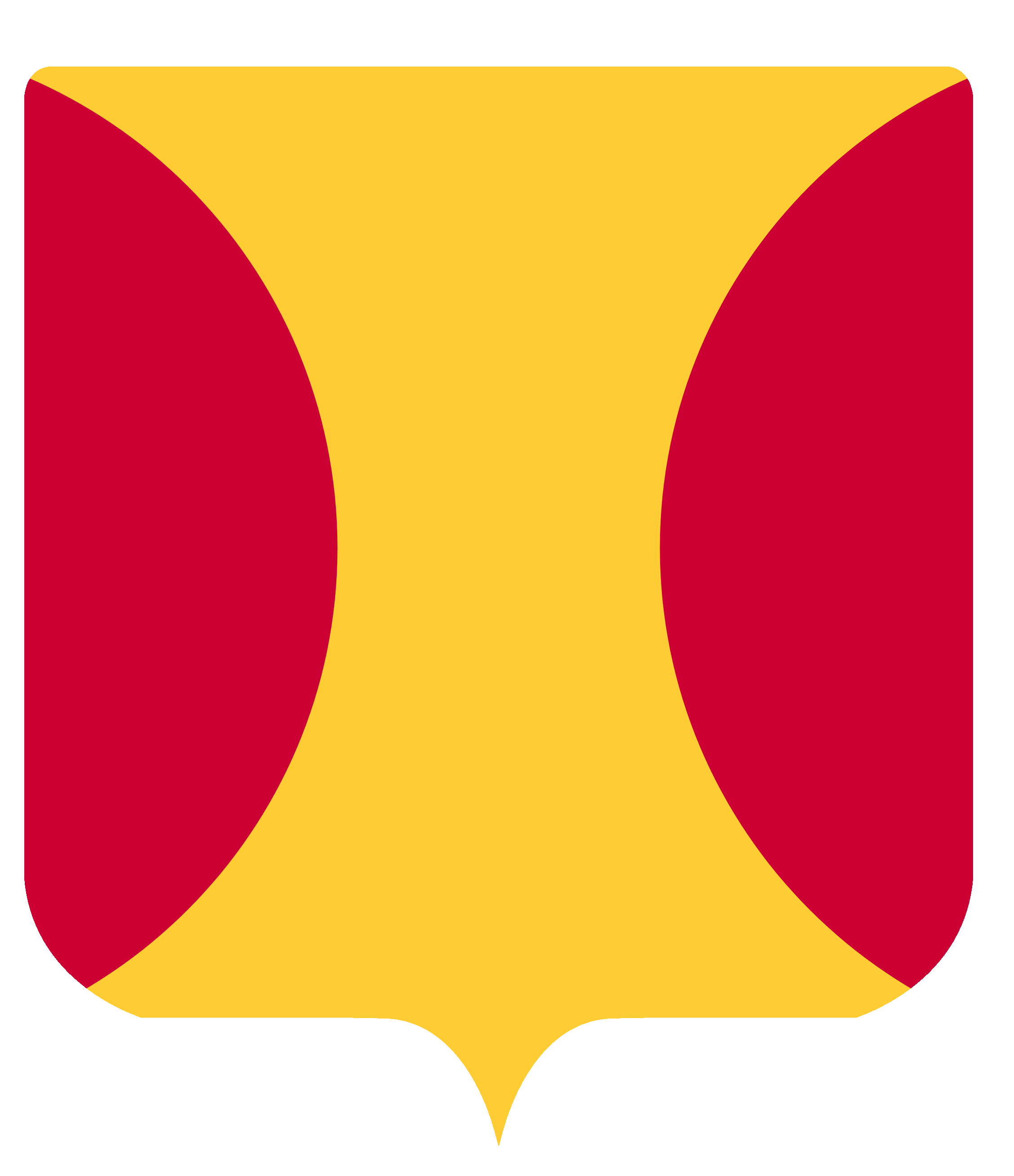
- Shoulder Sleeve Insignia of the Department
- Active: 26 June 1917–1947
- Country: United States
- Type: Department
- Role: Defense of the Panama Canal Zone
- Part of: War Department
- Garrison/HQ: Quarry Heights

Commanders
- Notable commanders: Malin Craig; Charles Martin

The Panama Canal Department was a geographic command of the United States Army. It was responsible for the defense of the Panama Canal Zone between 1917 and 1947.

== First U.S. Army presence ==
The first U.S. troops in Panama were U.S. Marines. They arrived in 1903 to ensure U.S. control of the Panama Railroad connecting the Atlantic and Pacific Oceans across the narrow waist of the Panamanian Isthmus.

The Marines protected the Panamanian civilian uprising against the government of Colombia led by former Panama Canal Company general manager Philippe-Jean Bunau-Varilla, thereby guaranteeing the separation of Panama from Colombia and his creation of the Panamanian state. Following the signing of the Hay–Bunau-Varilla Treaty granting control of the Panama Canal Zone to the United States, the Marines remained to provide security during the early construction days of the Panama Canal.

In 1904, Army Colonel William C. Gorgas was sent to the Canal Zone (as it was then called) as chief sanitary officer to fight yellow fever and malaria. In two years, yellow fever was eliminated from the Canal Zone. Soon after, malaria was also brought under control.

In February-March 1904, President Theodore Roosevelt created the Isthmian Canal Commission (ICC), composed primarily of Army officers, to govern the Canal Zone and to report directly to the Secretary of War. With the appointment of Army Lieutenant Colonel George W. Goethals to the post of Chief Engineer of the Isthmian Canal Commission by then President Theodore Roosevelt in 1907, the construction changed from a civilian to a military project.

To more adequately protect the Canal from external threats, the Army conducted an on-site survey in 1910 and began building defensive fortifications in 1911—to include Fort De Lesseps, Fort Randolph, and Fort Sherman on the Atlantic side, and Fort Amador and Grant on the Pacific side. On 4 Oct. 1911, the U.S. Army's 10th Infantry arrived at Camp E.S. Otis, on the Pacific side of the isthmus. They would form the nucleus of a mobile force that grew to include other infantry, cavalry, engineer, signal, and field artillery units, as well as a Marine battalion that had protected the Canal since 1904. They assumed primary responsibility for Canal defense. Together these troops, under the control of the ICC, were known as the Panama Canal Guard. In 1914, the Marine Battalion left the Isthmus to participate in operations against Pancho Villa in Mexico. On 14 August 1914, seven years after Goethals' arrival, the Panama Canal opened to world commerce.

The first company of coast artillery troops arrived in 1914 and later established fortifications at each end (Atlantic and Pacific) of the Canal as the Harbor Defenses (HD) of Cristobal and HD Balboa, respectively, with mobile forces of infantry and light artillery centrally located to support either end.

By 1915, a consolidated command was designated as Headquarters, U.S. Troops, Panama Canal Zone. The command reported directly to the Army's Eastern Department headquartered at Fort Jay, Governors Island, New York. The headquarters of this newly created command was first located in the Isthmian Canal Commission building in the town of Ancon, adjacent to Panama City. It relocated in 1916 to the nearby newly designated military post of Quarry Heights, which had begun construction in 1911.

The first United States air units arrived in the Canal Zone in February 1917. The 7th Aero Squadron was organized on 29 March at Ancón, Panama. It was equipped with Curtiss JN-4 "Jennys" and Curtiss R-3 and R-4 floatplanes.

The squadron initially came under the control of Headquarters, U.S. Troops, Panama Canal Zone, and beginning on 1 July 1917, Army aviation units were assigned directly to the Panama Canal Department, the controlling United States Army headquarters in the Canal Zone. During World War I, the 7th Aero was assigned to patrol for German U-boats off the Canal Zone under direction of Coast Defenses of Cristobal, from 1 June – 15 November 1918.

The 7th Aero Squadron was assigned to several fields during 1917 and 1918, those being Corozal (16 April); Empire (May); Fort Sherman (29 August); Cristobal (March 1918) before finding a permanent home at Coco Walk, which became France Field in May 1918. The 3d Observation Group, stationed at France Field, was activated in 1919. The Group controlled several Air Service light observation squadrons to protect the Panama Canal area.

== Panama Canal Department ==
The Panama Canal Department was created as a separate command of the United States Army on 26 June 1917 by separation from the Eastern Department. The department was initially headquartered at Ancón, relocating to Quarry Heights on 1 April 1920. It was responsible for the defense of the Canal Zone, including land areas, coastal defenses, harbor defenses, air defenses, and sea defenses within medium bomber range. The department was also responsible for the laying, maintaining, and clearing of harbor defense minefields that were to be placed at the canal entrance in event of a war. In event of a war, it was to defend against landings at either end of the Canal, coordinating with forces of the United States Navy.

The department controlled the major land force in the Canal Zone, the Panama Canal Division, which was activated in 1921. The division included two infantry brigades: the 19th, responsible for the Atlantic side of the canal, and the 20th, responsible for the Pacific side. The department included a separate command, the Panama Coast Artillery District, which was to provide coast defense against seaborne invasion. The division was disbanded in 1932.

In 1939 at the top of the military hierarchy was the commanding gen�eral of the Panama Canal Department. Directly under him were the commanders of the 19th Wing and of the Pacific and Atlantic Sectors, each one of which was independent of the other. The 19th Wing was made up of the 6th and 9th Bombardment Groups and the 16th, 20th, and 37th Pursuit Groups (fighters).

From September 1939, the 18th Infantry Brigade (5th and 13th Regiments, 2,678 officers and enlisted personnel), originally to assist in providing armed guards on vessels transiting the Canal, as well as other reinforcements were sent "..to Panama immediately. Two antiaircraft detachments, totaling about 30 officers and 868 enlisted men, were dispatched early in September in order to bring the units in Panama up to their allotted strength. At the same time, after hurried arrangements were made with Mexico and the Central American Republics, thirty new P-36 fighters were flown down to reinforce the air garrison. The coast artillery reinforcements, which had been held back pending completion of the housing program, were now sent forward, although the construction program had barely started."

Later, the Panama Mobile Force was activated on 16 February 1940 by Panama Canal Department commander, Lieutenant General Daniel Van Voorhis in order to improve defense of the Panama Canal Zone. Four infantry and one engineer regiment, plus two artillery battalions were assigned to the Mobile Force, even after World War II began. The plan to defend the Canal Zone was to conduct a mobile defense in depth beginning at the beaches and not by preparing and holding static defense positions. The Atlantic side was considered the least likely invasion route because the few landing areas there were too small to allow the discharge of numerous forces simultaneously.

On 10 February 1941, the Caribbean Defense Command was established as a theater command responsible for tactical control of the Panama Canal and Puerto Rican Departments, as well as bases in the Caribbean, eventually taking control of air and naval forces as well. It was co-located with the department headquarters at Quarry Heights, under the command of the department commander. During World War II, the department reached its peak strength in January 1943, when 68,000 men were under its control. On 1 November 1947 it was replaced by United States Army Caribbean, part of the joint United States Caribbean Command.

== Commanders ==
The following officers are known to have commanded the department:

- Brigadier General Edward H. Plummer (July–August 1917)
- Brigadier General Adelbert Cronkhite (August 1917)
- Colonel George F. Landers (August–October 1917)
- Major General William S. Graves (October 1917–February 1918)
- Major General Richard M. Blatchford (February 1918–April 1919)
- Brigadier General Chase W. Kennedy (18 April 1919 – 23 May 1921)
- Brigadier General Edwin B. Babbitt (24 May–22 October 1931)
- Major General Samuel D. Sturgis Jr. (22 October 1921 – 19 September 1924)
- Major General William Lassiter (19 September 1924 – 10 October 1926)
- Major General Charles Martin (10 October 1926 – 1 October 1927)
- Major General William S. Graves (2 October 1927 – 1 April 1928)
- Major General Malin Craig (1 April 1928 – 10 August 1930)
- Major General George L. Irwin (10 August–24 November 1930)
- Major General Preston Brown (24 November 1930 – 4 September 1933)
- Major General Harold B. Fiske (5 September 1933 – 10 November 1935)
- Major General Lytle Brown (10 November 1935 – 29 July 1936)
- Major General Henry W. Butner (30 July 1936 – 10 February 1937)
- Brigadier General Frank W. Rowell (10 February–12 April 1937)
- Major General David L. Stone (12 April 1937 – 7 January 1940)
- Lieutenant General Daniel Van Voorhis (7 January 1940 – 17 September 1941)
- Lieutenant General Frank M. Andrews (17 September 1941 – 9 November 1942)
- Lieutenant General George H. Brett (November 1942–October 1945)
- Lieutenant General Willis D. Crittenberger (October 1945–November 1947)

== See also ==
- Naval Base Panama Canal Zone
