= Harold Benjamin Fiske =

U.S. Army Major General

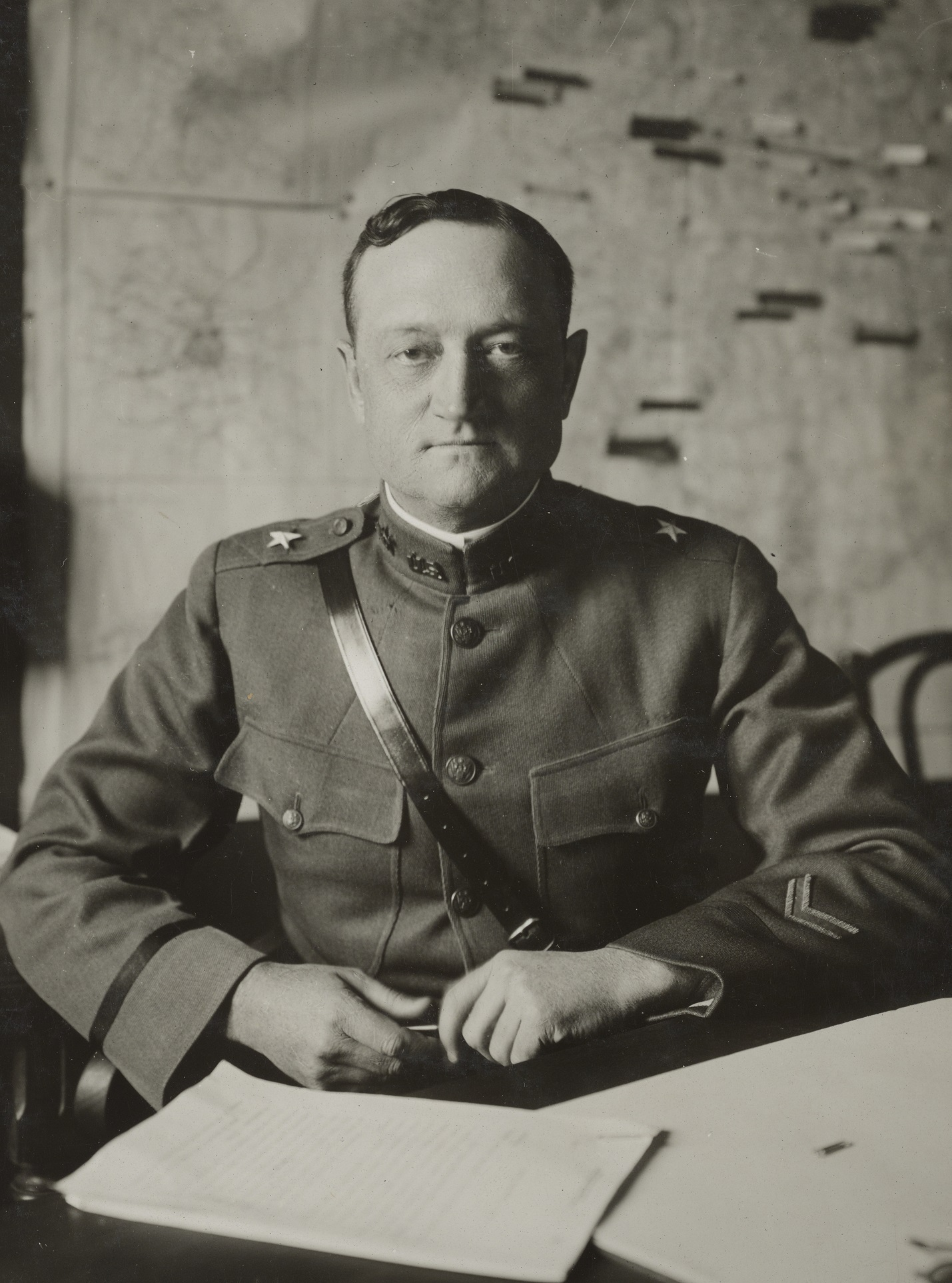
- Brigadier General Harold Fiske in September 1918 in Chaumont.
- Born: November 6, 1871; Salem, Oregon, US
- Died: May 1, 1960 (aged 88); San Diego, California, US
- Spouse: Lucy Brooks
- Children: 2
- Relatives: Thomas S. Timberman (son-in-law)
- Military career
- Allegiance: United States of America
- Branch: United States Army
- Service years: 1897–1935
- Rank: Major General
- Service number: 0-551
- Unit: Infantry Branch
- Commands: Panama Canal Department; Panama Canal Division; 87th Infantry Division
- Conflicts: Spanish–American War: Battle of Manila; Philippine–American War: Defense of Manila; Moro Rebellion; Veracruz Expedition; World War I: Battle of Saint-Mihiel; Second Battle of the Marne; Meuse-Argonne Offensive
- Awards: Distinguished Service Medal; Silver Star; Croix de Guerre; Legion of Honour; Order of Leopold; Order of the Crown of Italy

Harold Benjamin Fiske (November 6, 1871 – May 1, 1960) was a highly decorated United States Army officer with the rank of major general. A veteran of several conflicts, he distinguished himself during the Philippine–American War at the beginning of 20th century and later during the World War I as Chief, Training Section (G-5) of the American Expeditionary Force.

Following the War, he remained in the Army and completed his service in 1935 as major general and commanding general, Panama Canal Department.

== Early career ==
Harold B. Fiske was born on November 6, 1871, in Salem, Oregon as the son of Eugene Rufus Fiske, M.D. and Charlotte Scott Grubbe. He graduated from the Bishop Scott Academy in Portland, Oregon in May 1891 and taught for two years, before received an appointment to the United States Military Academy at West Point, New York in June 1893. During his time at the Academy, he was active in the football team and served as Class Vice-President.

Fiske graduated on June 21, 1897, with Bachelor of Science degree and was commissioned second lieutenant in the Infantry Branch. He was assigned to the 18th Infantry Regiment at Fort Sam Houston, Texas. In June 1898, his regiment sailed to the Philippines and Fiske took part in the combats against Spaniards during Battle of Manila.

Following the outbreak of the Philippine–American War in February 1899, Fiske participated in the Defense of Manila against Filipino Insurgents and other combat operations until his return to the United States in August 1901. For his service in the Philippines, Fiske was decorated with Silver Star.

Fiske spent few months with a stateside service with 28th Infantry Regiment and reached the rank of captain. He sailed back to the Philippines in May 1902 and participated in the fighting insurgents until December 1903, when he was ordered back to the United States.

When the government of Cuban President Tomás Estrada Palma collapsed, U.S. President Theodore Roosevelt ordered U.S. military forces into Cuba. Their mission was to prevent fighting between the Cubans, to protect U.S. economic interests there, and to hold free elections in order to establish a new and legitimate government. Fiske was stationed on Cuba and participated in the occupation duty until February 1909, when United States withdrew its troops following the election of José Miguel Gómez.

Upon his return to the United States, Fiske attended the Army School of the Line at Fort Leavenworth, Kansas and Army Staff College and graduated with honors from both institutions. He then served consecutively as an instructor at both schools until November 1914, when he participated in the Veracruz Expedition during the ongoing Mexican Revolution.

Fiske returned to his capacity as an instructor at Army Staff College in Washington, D.C. and remained in that assignment until the April 1917. During his tenure at Army Staff College, Fiske became an advocate of the improvements in the Infantry tactics and proposed for example the expanding of Infantry company from 150 to 250 men, the extensive use of grenades or adopting the German machine gun ratio. His proposal were based on the experiences of the European armies or unit fighting on the Eastern Front, where the war was more mobile. Fiske also saw temporary duty on the staff of General John J. Pershing on the Mexican Border in mid-1916 and reached the rank of major.

== World War I ==
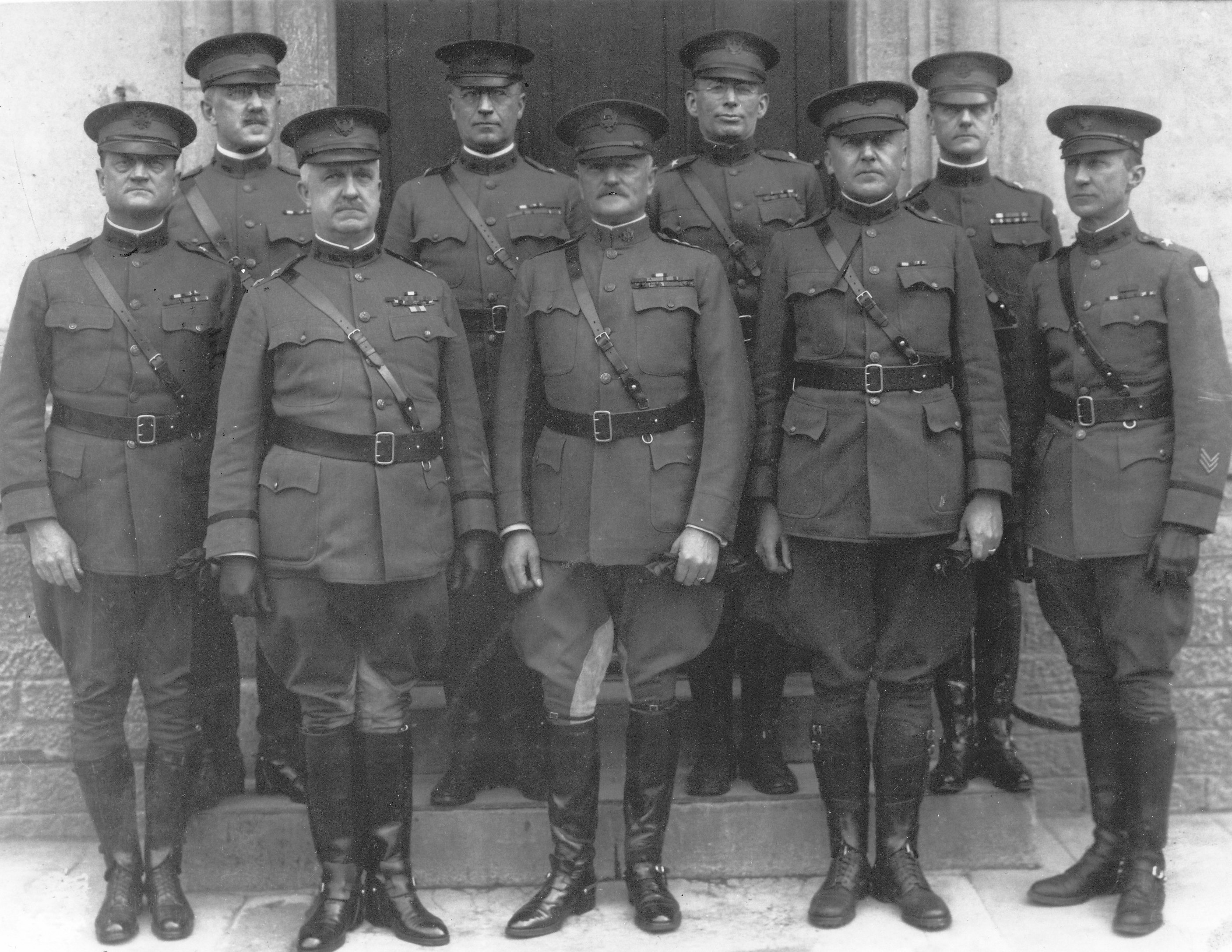
General John J. Pershing and members of his staff. Stood on the far left in the front row is Brigadier General Harold B. Fiske.

Shortly following the American entry into World War I, Fiske was attached to the 2nd Infantry Brigade under Brigadier General Robert Lee Bullard in June 1917 and embarked for France as the brigade's adjutant. He was promoted to the temporary rank of lieutenant colonel soon afterwards and transferred to the Training Section (G-5) of the American Expeditionary Forces (AEF), commanded by Major General John J. Pershing.

There he served as Deputy to Section Chief, Colonel Paul B. Malone and faced many difficult situations during the training of the AEF troops. Fiske replaced Malone in February 1918 and was to hold that command for the duration of the war. He often criticized the War Department and unit commanders for the inability to fulfill the requirements of the AEF training system. Fiske insisted that all officers must attended the AEF staff and specialist schools upon arrival to France regardless of when the parent unit was scheduled to enter combat. As a consequence, some units arrival in France, were stripped of their officers and non-commissioned officers, and, because of the demands of combat, were sent into the line under the command of strangers.

On the other hand, General Pershing recognized Fiske as skilled staff officer and administrator and promoted him to the temporary rank of brigadier general on June 26, 1918. Fiske voluntarily served with the 1st Infantry Division during the Battle of Saint-Mihiel and Second Battle of the Marne and with 79th and the 2nd Infantry Divisions during Meuse-Argonne Offensive. His first-hand observations of troop performance in combat helped improve the AEF training system.

For his service in France, Fiske was decorated with Army Distinguished Service Medal based on the recommendation of General Pershing and also received several foreign decorations of Allied nations: Legion of Honour, rank Commander, French Croix de Guerre with Palm by the Government of France, the Order of Leopold from Belgium, and the Order of the Crown of Italy.

== Postwar career ==
Fiske returned to the United States in August 1919 and reverted to his peacetime rank of major along with hundreds of other officers. He was appointed an instructor at the Army Infantry School at Fort Benning, Georgia and a few months later was promoted again to the rank of lieutenant colonel.

Upon the appointment of General Pershing as Chief of Staff of the United States Army in July 1921, Fiske was transferred to the War Department General Staff and appointed a Chief of the Training Section. He was promoted again to the rank of brigadier general in 1922 and remained in that capacity until December 1924 when he was transferred to Fort Sam Houston, Texas for command of 4th Infantry Brigade as the part of 2nd Infantry Division.

In June 1927, he assumed command of 3rd Infantry Brigade, also part of 2nd Division, and held that command until November that year when he was attached to the staff of Fourth Corps Area with headquarters at Fort McPherson, Georgia. Fiske remained in that capacity until April 1930, when he assumed command of 87th Infantry Division, the Organized Reserve of Louisiana, Alabama, and Mississippi.

Fiske was ordered to the Panama Canal Zone in April 1931 and succeeded his West Point Classmate, Charles DuVal Roberts, as commanding general, Panama Canal Division. In this capacity, he was responsible for the defense of the Atlantic Sector. He was promoted to major general in August 1933 and assumed command of the Panama Canal Department. Fiske was responsible for the complete defense of the Panama Canal Zone and got into conflict with Nelson Rounsevell, a controversial editor of the Panama American Newspaper and advisor to Panamian President Arnulfo Arias.

Rounsevell claimed that the harsh command style of Colonel James V. Heidt, Commander of Fort Clayton, forced four men to suicide. Fiske, as Heidt's direct superior officer, subsequently pressed charges of criminal libel and Rounsevell was arrested and then released on $2,500 Bond. Rounsevell was acquitted and given suspended sentence in order to be denied the martyrdom he may have sought. It is not known whether this case had impact on Fiske; however, he retired from active duty on November 30, 1935, completing 38 years of commissioned service.

== Retirement ==
Following his retirement from the Army, Fiske settled in San Diego, California and was active in several retired officers associations. He died on May 1, 1960, and was buried with full military honors at Fort Rosecrans National Cemetery. His wife, Lucy Beatrice Keyes (1874–1954) is buried beside him. They had two daughters: Virginia, the wife of Major General Thomas S. Timberman, and Berenice.

== Decorations ==
Here is Major General Fiske's ribbon bar:

1st Row	Army Distinguished Service Medal		Silver Star
2nd Row	Spanish Campaign Medal	Philippine Campaign Medal	Army of Cuban Occupation Medal
3rd Row	Mexican Service Medal	World War I Victory Medal with five Battle Clasps	Legion of Honour, rank Commander
4th Row	French Croix de guerre 1914-1918 with Palm	Belgian Order of Leopold, rank Commander	Order of the Crown of Italy, rank Commander

== See also ==
- American Expeditionary Forces

Military offices
Preceded by Preston Brown	Commanding General, Panama Canal Department; September 5, 1933 – November 10, 1935	Succeeded by Lytle Brown
Preceded by Charles DuVal Roberts	Commanding General, Panama Canal Division; April 3, 1931 – April 15, 1932	Succeeded by Command dissolved

== Bibliography ==
- Davis, Henry Blaine Jr. (1998). Generals in Khaki. Raleigh, North Carolina: Pentland Press. ISBN 1571970886. OCLC 40298151.
- Marquis Who's Who (1975). Who Was Who In American History – The Military. Chicago, Illinois: Marquis Who's Who. ISBN 0837932017.
