= Hawaiian Division =

Former US Army garrison unit

- Shoulder Sleeve Insignia
- Active: 1921–1941
- Country: United States
- Branch: United States Army
- Garrison/HQ: Schofield Barracks

The Hawaiian Division was a division of the United States Army, dedicated to the defense of Hawaii. This division was named rather than numbered, as were the Philippine, Panama Canal and Americal Divisions. It was first activated under the peacetime Square Division Table of Organization and Equipment (TO&E) on 25 February 1921 as the Hawaiian Division using assets of the World War I era 11th Infantry Division. It, the Philippine Division, and the Americal Division were the last three U.S. Army divisions to be named rather than numbered. Joseph E. Kuhn, then in command of Schofield Barracks, oversaw the initial organization and employment of the division.

The division retained the square division TO&E until 1941, when it was reorganized under a triangular division TO&E, and part of its former organization became the core of the new 24th Infantry Division and 25th Infantry Division. It included the 21st and 22nd Infantry Brigades, and the 19th, 21st, 27th, and 35th Infantry Regiments.

== Division organization ==
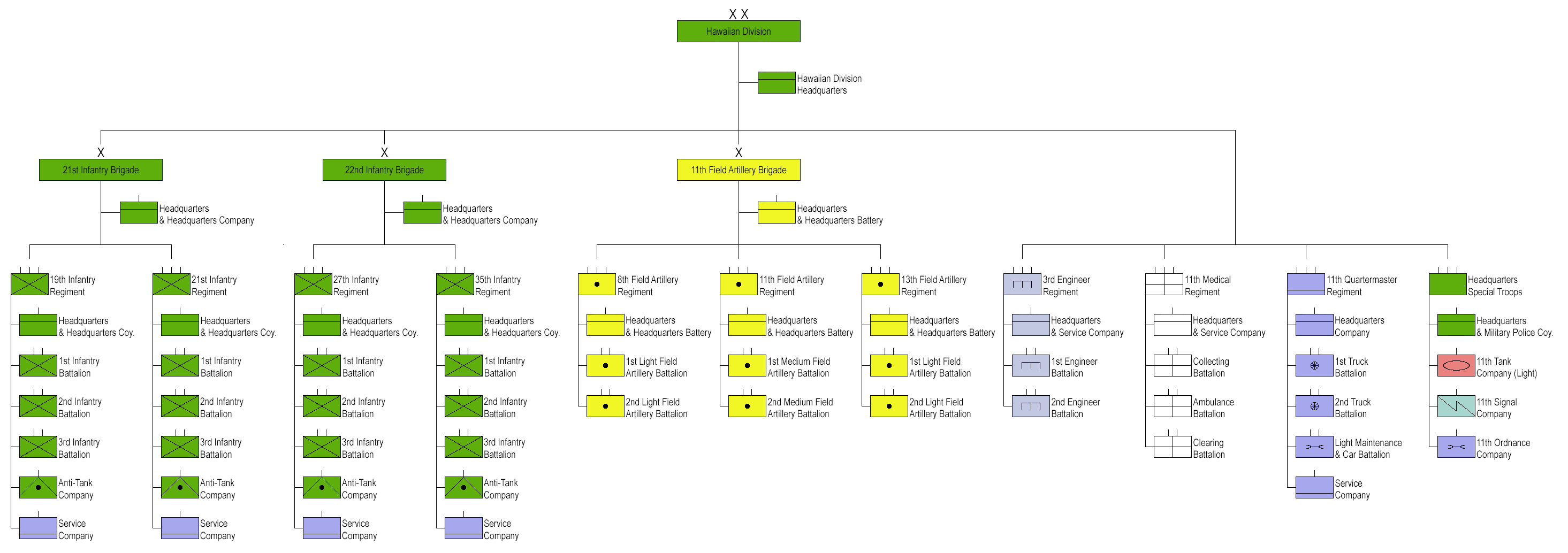
Hawaiian Division organization 1940 (click to enlarge)

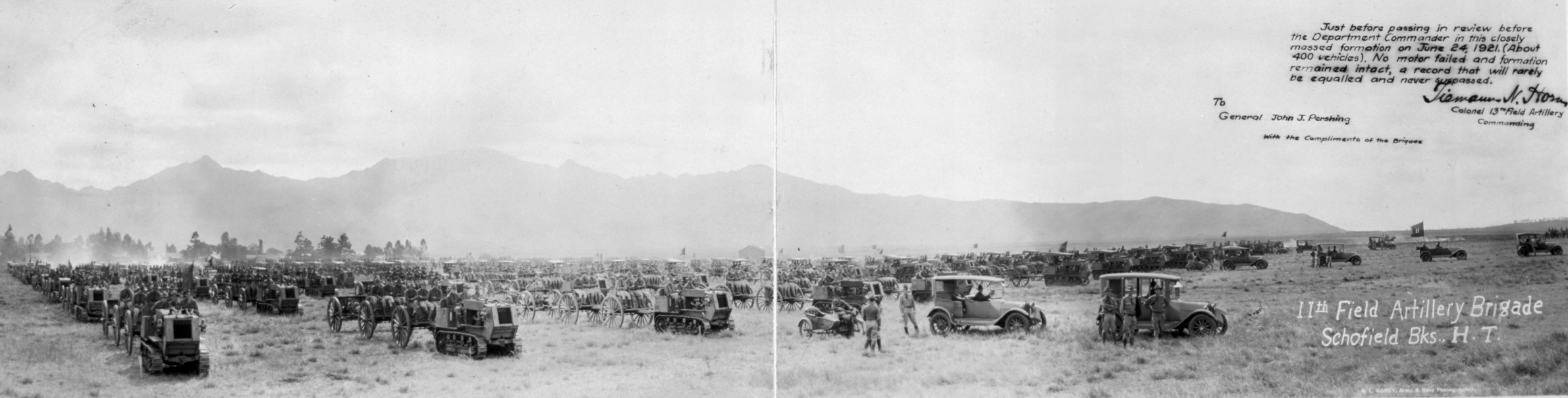
The U.S. Army 11th Field Artillery Brigade, at Schofield Barracks, Territory of Hawaii, in 1924

- Hawaiian Division
  - 21st Infantry Brigade
    - 19th Infantry Regiment
    - 21st Infantry Regiment
  - 22nd Infantry Brigade
    - 27th Infantry Regiment
    - 35th Infantry Regiment
  - 11th Field Artillery Brigade
    - 8th Field Artillery Regiment (Light)
    - 11th Field Artillery Regiment (Medium)
    - 13th Field Artillery Regiment (Light)
    - 11th Ammunition Train
  - 3rd Engineer Regiment
  - 11th Medical Regiment
  - Hawaiian Division Train, Quartermaster Corps (later reorganized as 11th Quartermaster Regiment)
  - Hawaiian Division Air Service (later disbanded)
  - 11th Quartermaster Regiment
  - Hawaiian Division (Pack) Train
  - Headquarters, Special Troops
    - Headquarters and Military Police Company
    - 11th Signal Company
    - 11th Ordnance Company (Medium)
    - 11th Tank Company (Light)
    - 11th Motorcycle Company (later disbanded)

== History ==
=== Interwar period ===
The Hawaiian Division was constituted in the Regular Army on 1 February 1921 and activated at Schofield Barracks, Territory of Hawaii, on 1 March 1921. The division was the primary ground force of the Hawaiian Department and was given the mission of defending the Hawaiian Islands from potential invaders. The division had the primary responsibility to defend the island of Oahu, with the 21st Infantry Brigade defending the northern half of the island and the 22nd Infantry Brigade responsible for the southern half. The other outlying islands were to be defended by the regiments of the Hawaii National Guard. Throughout 1921–23, the division was busy with receiving newly assigned units, activating new units, and organizing the old ones into brigades in order to mold an effective fighting force. It was not until 1925 that the division was put into the field to begin practicing the mission with which it was tasked. In April of that year, the Hawaiian Division participated in large-scale joint Army–Navy maneuvers, which included protecting the islands from an invasion force provided by the U.S. Marine Corps. The next major maneuver for the division was another Army–Navy exercise in February 1931, followed by Hawaiian Department maneuvers in October and November. These exercises were the primary training events for the division during the interwar years and occurred about once a year from 1931 on. Due to the very small budgets of the time, units did not spend a lot of the time in the field. As a result, much of the soldiers’ time was spent on police call, “rock painting,” and other post beautification projects. In the Hawaiian Division, sports were high on the list of preferred activities. Competition was fierce, particularly between regiments, and all events drew a large crowd of both officers and men.

Outings to Honolulu were the favorite form of pastime for the soldiers, but the isolated location of Schofield Barracks and the control of passes by company first sergeants made such trips less frequent than the soldiers would have preferred. The Hawaiian Division was known as a “spit and polish” outfit in the interwar Army, and there was a lot of time to conduct drill and ceremonies. As a result, the division participated in reviews on a regular basis. The first division review was held on 24 June 1921 in honor of Brigadier General Joseph E. Kuhn, the division’s first commander. Throughout the interwar years, reviews were held to honor many well-known persons who were members of the division or were visitors to the Hawaiian Islands. Reviews for the incoming or departing division commanders were standard procedure, but reviews were also held for the governor of Hawaii, the secretary of war, and members of Congress. The most well-known honoree at a Hawaiian Division review, however, was President Franklin D. Roosevelt when he visited Schofield Barracks on 26 July 1934. By the late 1930s, the idyllic existence of the Hawaiian Division was fast coming to an end as tensions increased between the United States and Japan. The training of the division became more serious and more realistic, but before it could have its mettle tested in battle, the Hawaiian Division was split on 1 October 1941 to form the new triangular 24th and 25th Infantry Divisions. The lineage and shoulder sleeve insignia of the division was assigned to the 24th Division. Regiments of the Hawaii National Guard provided the third regiment of each division; the 299th Regiment went to the 24th and the 298th Regiment went to the 25th Infantry Division.

=== World War II ===
The 24th and 25th Infantry Divisions were among the first to see combat in World War II and among the last to stop fighting. The Divisions were on Oahu, with headquarters at Schofield Barracks, and suffered minor casualties when the Japanese bombed Pearl Harbor on 7 December 1941. Charged with the defense of Oahu and the Hawaiian Islands, they built an elaborate system of coastal defenses before deploying for further combat operations.

== Lineage ==
- Constituted 1 February 1921 in the Regular Army as Headquarters, Hawaiian Division
- Activated 1 March 1921 at Schofield Barracks, Hawaii
- Inactivated 1 October 1941 at Schofield Barracks

== Commanders ==
- BG Joseph E. Kuhn: 1 March – 22 December 1921
- BG John D. Barrette: 22 December 1921 – February 1922
- MG Charles T. Menoher: February 1922 – 10 August 1924
- BG Thomas H. Slavens: 10 August – 16 September 1924
- MG Edward M. Lewis: 16 September 1924 – 13 January 1925
- BG George Van Horn Moseley: 13 January – February 1925
- MG William R. Smith: February 1925 – 25 August 1927
- BG George Van Horn Moseley: 25 August – October 1927
- MG Fox Conner: October 1927 – 25 January 1928
- BG Paul A. Wolf: 25 January – 6 April 1928
- MG Edwin B. Winans: 6 April 1928 – 25 October 1930
- MG Briant H. Wells: 25 October 1930 – 1 September 1931
- BG Otho B. Rosenbaum: 1 September – 15 October 1931
- MG Albert J. Bowley: 15 October 1931 – 16 April 1934
- BG James C. Gowen: 16 April – 2 June 1934
- MG Halstead Dorey: 2 June 1934 – 5 December 1935
- BG James C. Gowen: 5 December 1935 – 11 March 1936
- MG Andrew Moses: 11 March 1936 – 30 July 1937
- BG Robert C. Foy: 30 July – 7 October 1937
- MG Charles D. Herron: 7 October 1937 – 16 March 1938
- MG James A. Woodruff: 16 March 1938 – 13 March 1939
- MG William H. Wilson: 13 March 1939 – February 1941
- BG Daniel I. Sultan: February – 25 April 1941
- MG Maxwell Murray: 25 April – 1 October 1941

== See also ==
- Formations of the United States Army

== Sources ==
- U.S. Army Order of Battle 1919–1941, Volume 1. The Arms: Major Commands and Infantry Organizations, 1919–41 by Lieutenant Colonel (Retired) Steven E. Clay, Combat Studies Institute Press, Fort Leavenworth, KS, 2011
