= Lytle Brown =

United States Army general

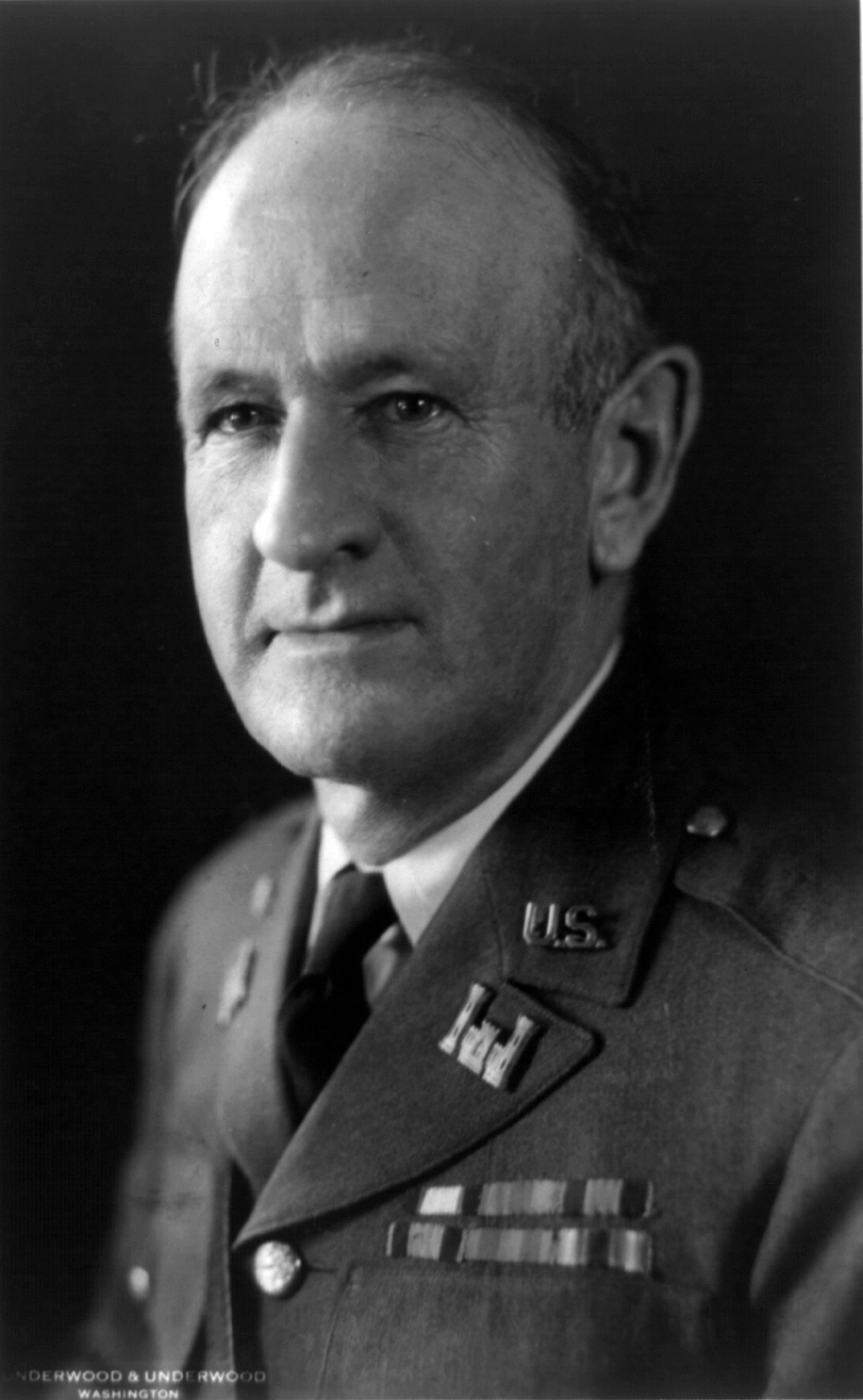
- Major General Lytle Brown, Chief of Engineers 1929–1933
- Born: November 22, 1872; Nashville, Tennessee, U.S.
- Died: May 3, 1951 (aged 78); Franklin, Tennessee, U.S.
- Burial place: Mount Olivet Cemetery
- Military career
- Allegiance: United States of America
- Branch: United States Army
- Service years: 1898–1936
- Rank: Major General
- Service number: 0-588
- Commands: 2d Battalion of Engineers; Chief of Engineers; Panama Canal Department
- Wars: Spanish–American War; Mexican Expedition; World War I
- Awards: Distinguished Service Medal, Order of the Bath, Officer of the Legion of Honour

Lytle Brown (November 22, 1872 – May 3, 1951) was a U.S. Army officer who fought in the Spanish–American War and participated in the Mexican Expedition of 1916. Brown served as Chief of Engineers from 1929 to 1933.

== Early life ==
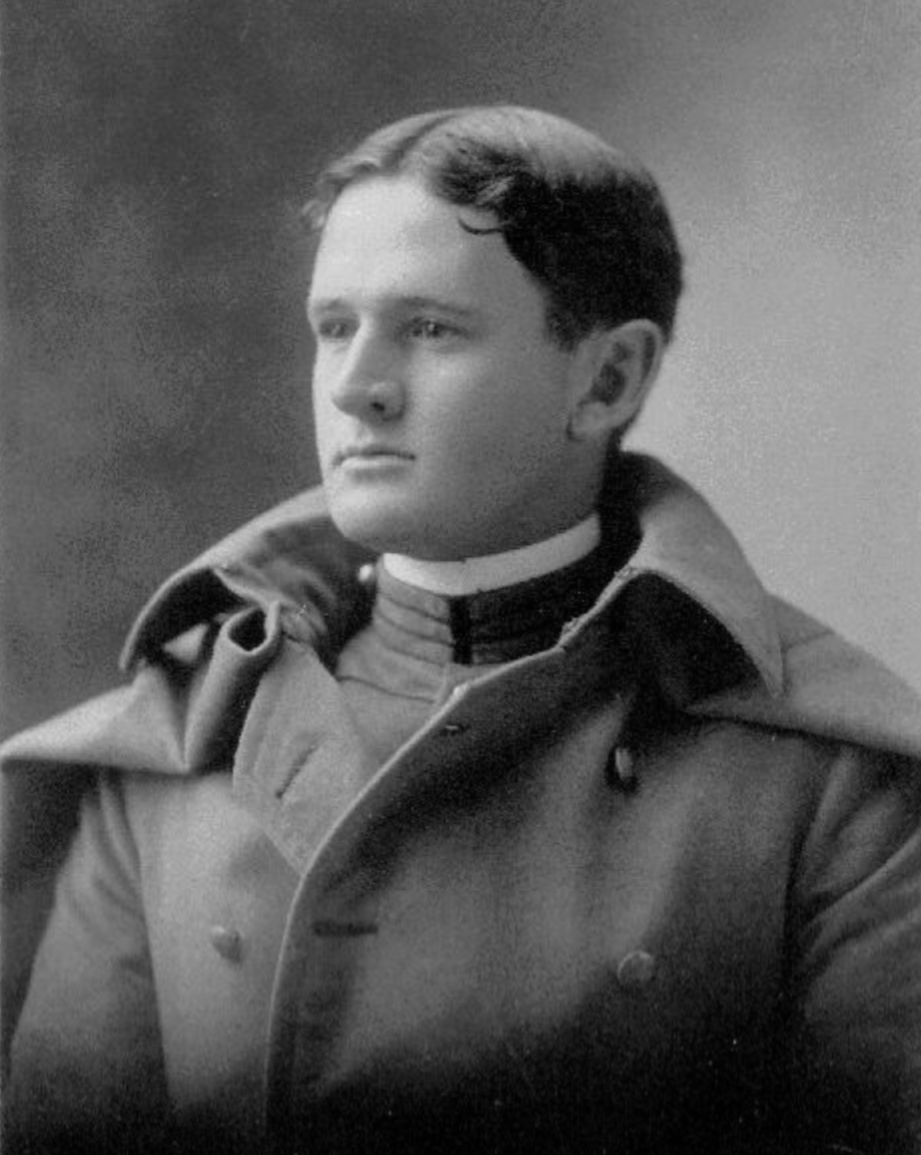
At West Point in 1898

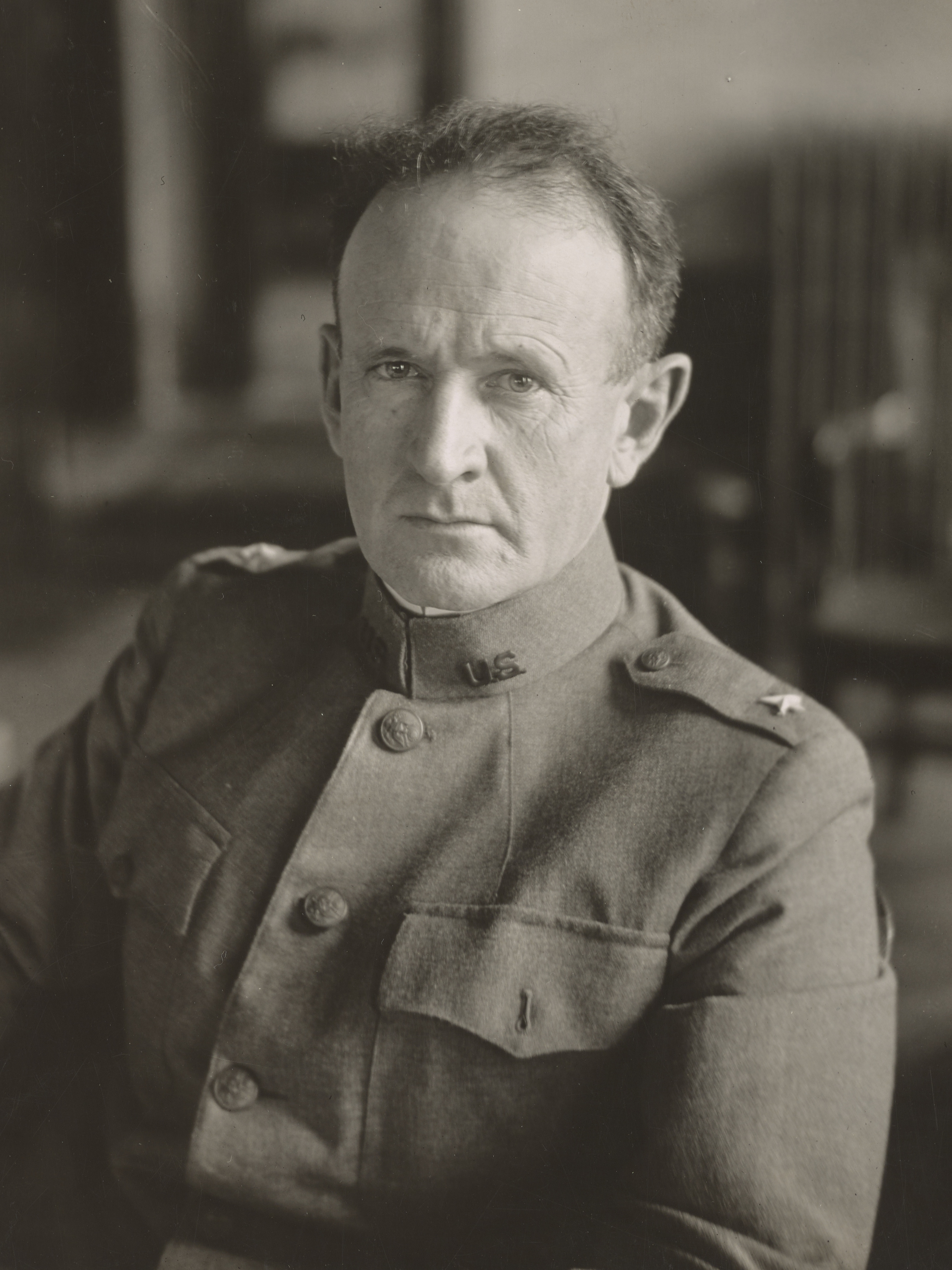
General Lytle Brown in May 1918

Born November 22, 1872, in Nashville, Tennessee, Lytle Brown was the son of James Trimble Brown (1842–1878) and Jane Foster Nichol Brown (1845–1916). His father had been a first lieutenant in the Confederate Army and a post-war attorney in Nashville. Lytle Brown was a grandson of Neill S. Brown, an antebellum governor of Tennessee.

Brown graduated fourth in the United States Military Academy (West Point) class of 1898 and was commissioned a second lieutenant in the Corps of Engineers.

== Military career ==
Brown served with engineer troops in Cuba in 1898 at the Battle of San Juan Hill and the siege of Santiago before being made Engineer of the Department of Northern Luzon in the Philippine Islands in 1900. After completing his tour in the Philippines, he served an instructor at West Point from 1903 to 1907. Brown oversaw river improvement projects in 1908–12 as Louisville District Engineer.

While commanding a battalion of engineers at Fort Leavenworth, Kansas in 1911, General Brown made Douglas MacArthur, future General of the Army, his adjutant. When General MacArthur was chief of staff, he placed Brown in charge of the Panama Canal district. Brown commanded the 2d Battalion of Engineers and served as engineer of Pershing's 1916 punitive expedition into Mexico. In 1917, he was promoted to colonel, and then in 1918 to the rank of wartime brigadier. Brown headed the War Plans Division of the War Department General Staff from May 1918 to June 1919, addressing important Army policy issues during and immediately after World War I, and was awarded the Army Distinguished Service Medal.

Brown oversaw construction work at the Wilson Dam hydroelectric project in 1919–20. He was assistant commandant of the Army War College and a brigade commander in the Canal Zone before becoming Chief of Engineers, from 1929 to 1933. He concluded his military career as commander of the Panama Canal Department (1935–36). General Brown retired November 30, 1936.

== Awards ==
- Army Distinguished Service Medal
- Order of the Bath
- Officer of the Legion of Honour

The citation for his Army DSM reads:

The President of the United States of America, authorized by Act of Congress, July 9, 1918, takes pleasure in presenting the Army Distinguished Service Medal to Brigadier General Lytle Brown, United States Army, for exceptionally meritorious and distinguished services to the Government of the United States, in a duty of great responsibility as Director of the War Plans Division, for his skill and good judgment in handling the many and varied questions of training, organization and policy that have been acted on by the War Plans Division during World War I.

== In politics ==
In Huey Long's posthumous book, My First Days in the White House, Brown was to have been his nominee to be Secretary of the Interior.

During his retirement, he was active as a member of the National Capital Planning Commission.

== Death and legacy ==
Brown died at his home near Franklin, Tennessee, on May 3, 1951, at the age of 78. He was buried in the Mount Olivet Cemetery.

Military offices
Preceded by Edgar Jadwin	Chief of Engineers; 1929–1933	Succeeded by Edward Murphy Markham
