= Andrew Moses =

U.S. Army major general

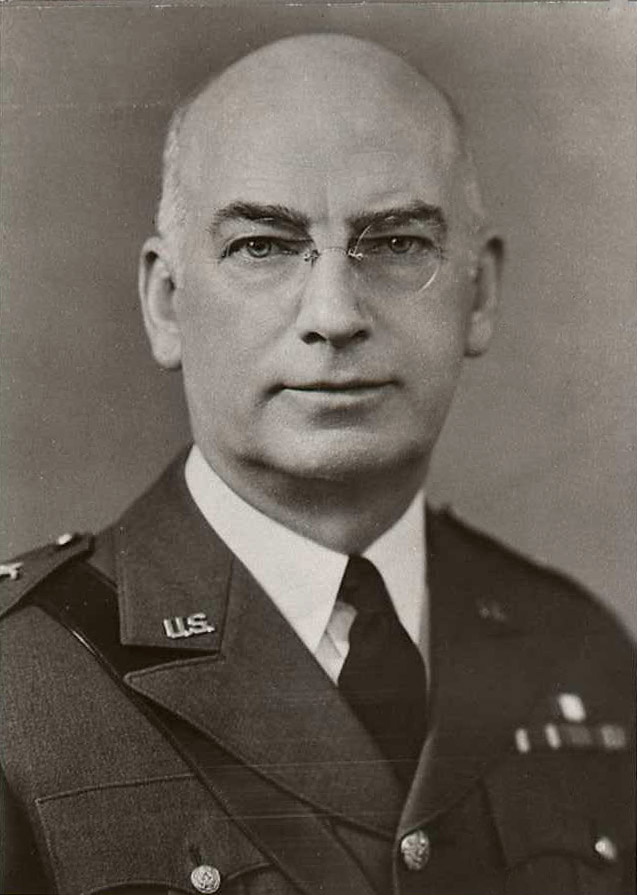
- Moses as commander of the Hawaiian Department in 1938
- Born: June 6, 1874; Burnet, Texas, U.S.
- Died: December 22, 1946 (aged 72); Washington, D.C.
- Burial place: Arlington National Cemetery
- Spouse: Jessie Fisher (m. 1897–1946, his death)
- Children: 1
- Military career
- Allegiance: United States
- Branch: United States Army
- Service years: 1897–1938
- Rank: Major General
- Service number: 0–572
- Unit: Coast Artillery Corps
- Commands: Fort Scammel, Maine; Battery N, 7th Artillery Regiment; 23rd Coast Artillery Company; Santa Clara Battery, Havana, Cuba; 75th Coast Artillery Company; Commandant of Cadets, Texas A&M University; Fort H. G. Wright, New York; 316th Field Artillery Regiment; 156th Field Artillery Brigade; Joint Board of Review for Redelivery of Troop Transports; 13th Field Artillery Regiment; 2nd Coast Artillery District; Panama Coast Artillery District
- Conflicts: Spanish–American War; First Occupation of Cuba; World War I
- Awards: Army Distinguished Service Medal (2)
- Other work: President, Army and Navy Club

Andrew Moses (June 6, 1874 – December 22, 1946) was a career officer in the United States Army. A graduate of the United States Military Academy, he served from 1897 to 1938, and was a veteran of the Spanish–American War and World War I. He attained the rank of major general and was most notable for his service as commander of 156th Field Artillery Brigade, 81st Division during the First World War, the Hawaiian Division and Schofield Barracks from 1936 to July 30, 1937, and the Hawaiian Department from 1937 to 1938.

== Early life ==
Andrew Moses was born in Burnet, Texas on June 6, 1874, the son of Norton Moses and Lucy Anne (Kerr) Moses. He attended the public schools of Burnet County and Round Rock Institute in Round Rock, Texas. He was a student at the University of Texas at Austin for a year, then began attendance at the United States Military Academy. Moses graduated from West Point in 1897 ranked 56th of a class of 67. He received his commission as a second lieutenant of Infantry and was assigned to the 11th Infantry Regiment at Whipple Barracks, Arizona. That year Moses married Jessie Fisher (1877–1951). The two remained married until his death, and were the parents of a daughter, Kathleen.

== Career ==
=== Early career ===
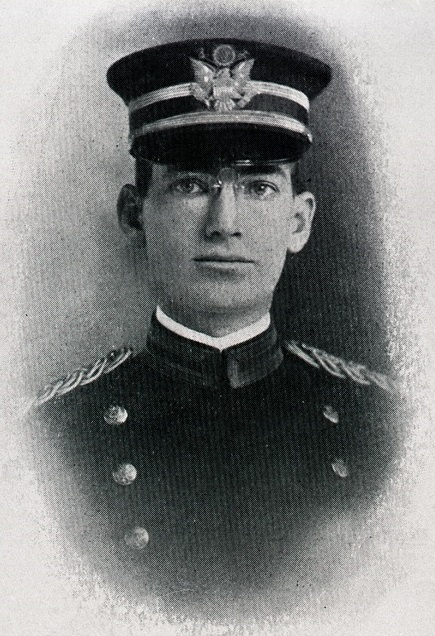
Moses as a captain assigned to Texas A&M University, circa 1911

In March 1898, Moses transferred to the Artillery Branch and was assigned to the 7th Artillery Regiment at Fort Slocum, New York. During the Spanish–American War, he took part in the coastal defenses of Maine, first at Fort Preble, then as commander of the post at Fort Scammel. From mid to late September 1898, Moses was on recruiting duty in Philadelphia.

Moses remained in Philadelphia until September 1899, when he was assigned to command of Battery N, 7th Artillery at Fort Totten, New York. In November 1899, he was promoted to first lieutenant, and in December he was assigned to field artillery duty at Fort Riley, Kansas. Moses was promoted to captain in August 1901 and in October he was posted to Havana, Cuba during the First Occupation of Cuba and assigned as commander of the 23rd Coast Artillery Company. From November 1901 to May 1902, Moses acted as chief Ordnance officer for the Department of Cuba. From May 1902 to June 1903, Moses commanded the Santa Clara Battery in Havana Harbor.

From June 1903 to August 1905, Moses commanded the 75th Coast Artillery Company at Fort Preble. From September 1905 to August 1906, Moses was a student at Fort Totten's School of Submarine Defense. (Note: The School of Submarine Defense taught the use of underwater mines for harbor defense.) From October 1906 to August 1907, Moses was assigned as artillery engineer and ordnance officer for the District of Charleston, South Carolina.

From September 1907 to August 1911, Moses was commandant of cadets and professor of military science at Texas A&M University. From September to December 1911, Moses was assigned to Fort Caswell, North Carolina, and he was promoted to major of Coast Artillery in October 1911. From December 1911 to March 1913, he was assigned to Fort McKinley, Maine. From March 1913 to August 1914, Moses was commander of the post at Fort H. G. Wright, New York. From August to November 1914 he was assigned as inspector and instructor of the New York National Guard. From November 1914 to August 1917, Moses was assigned to duty with the Army General Staff in Washington, D.C. He was promoted to lieutenant colonel of Coast Artillery in May 1917, a month after the American entry into World War I.

=== World War I ===
In August 1917, Moses was promoted to temporary colonel and assigned to command the 81st Division's 316th Field Artillery Regiment at Camp Jackson, South Carolina. He remained in command of the regiment during its organization and training for World War I, and its July 1918 departure for combat in France. In June 1918, Moses was promoted to temporary brigadier general. After arriving in France, he was assigned to command of the 316th's higher headquarters, the 156th Field Artillery Brigade. He remained in command until the end of the war in November 1918. Afterwards, he performed post-war occupation duty, then led his brigade back to the United States in June 1919.

After returning to the United States, Moses was assigned to New York City as chairman of the Joint Board of Review for Redelivery of Troop Transports, and he remained in this post until May 1920. The joint board was responsible for returning the ships the U.S. military had seized for wartime use, and for agreeing to payment terms with their owners. In May 1920, Moses was reduced to his permanent rank of lieutenant colonel. Moses' wartime service was recognized with award of the Army Distinguished Service Medal. The citation for the medal reads:

The President of the United States of America, authorized by Act of Congress, July 9, 1918, takes pleasure in presenting the Army Distinguished Service Medal to Brigadier General Andrew Moses, United States Army, for exceptionally meritorious and distinguished services to the Government of the United States, in a duty of great responsibility during World War I. Commanding the 316th Field Artillery, 81st Division, from August 1917, and the 156th Field Artillery Brigade, 81st Division, from June 1918 until it was demobilized, General Moses exhibited qualities of excellent leadership and military attainments of a high order. Later, as Chairman of a Joint Board of Review he occupied a position of great responsibility, having full charge and control of the re-delivery of all ships allocated to the War Department during the World War. By his administrative ability, excellent judgment, energy, and tact, he rendered conspicuous services in bringing about speedy and accurate settlements with the ship owners, which resulted in a large saving to the Government.

=== Later career ===
From May 1920 to May 1921, Moses was a student at the United States Army War College. In July 1920, he received permanent promotion to colonel. After graduation, he remained at the college as director of the Intelligence and Personnel courses from 1921 to 1923. In 1923, Moses was assigned to Hawaii as commander of the 13th Field Artillery Regiment. In 1927, he was assigned as executive officer of the 155th Field Artillery Brigade, an Organized Reserve unit based in Washington, D.C. As the senior regular army officer assigned to Washington's reserve units, Moses was the primary trainer and advisor for the area's reservists.

In 1928, Moses was again assigned as director of the Personnel course at the Army War College, after which he completed the aerial observation courses at the Coast Artillery School and Air Tactical School. Moses commanded the 2nd Coast Artillery District at Fort Totten from November 1929 to February 1930, and was promoted to permanent brigadier general in January 1930. From March 1930 to October 1931, Moses commanded the Panama Coast Artillery District.

Moses was assigned as Assistant Chief of Staff (G-1) on the Army Staff from October 1931 to October 1935. While living in Washington, he also served as vice president and president of the Army and Navy Club. Moses performed unassigned staff duty from October 1935 to January 1936, and was promoted to major general in December 1935. He commanded the Hawaiian Division and Schofield Barracks from March 1936 to July 1937. From July 1937 to June 1938, Moses was commanding general of the Hawaiian Department. At his retirement, Moses received a second award of the Army Distinguished Service Medal.

== Later life and legacy ==
Moses reached the mandatory retirement age of 64 in June 1938, after which he resided in Washington, DC. He died at Walter Reed Army Medical Center on December 22, 1946. Moses was buried at Arlington National Cemetery. The Moses/Reed Collection are stored at the Natural History Museum of Los Angeles County. Part of the Seaver Center for Western History Research, the Moses/Reed papers include maps, photos, lecture notes, and other materials accumulated by Andrew Moses and Frank Reed during their military careers. Moses Hall, a residence building at Texas A&M University, was constructed in 1942 and was named for Moses.

== Works by ==
- "Use of the 12-Inch Mortar in the Land Defense of Coast Fortifications". Journal of the United States Artillery. Fort Monroe, VA: U.S. Army Artillery School. May–June 1907. p. 232 – via Google Books.
