= Harley Bascom Ferguson =

United States Army general

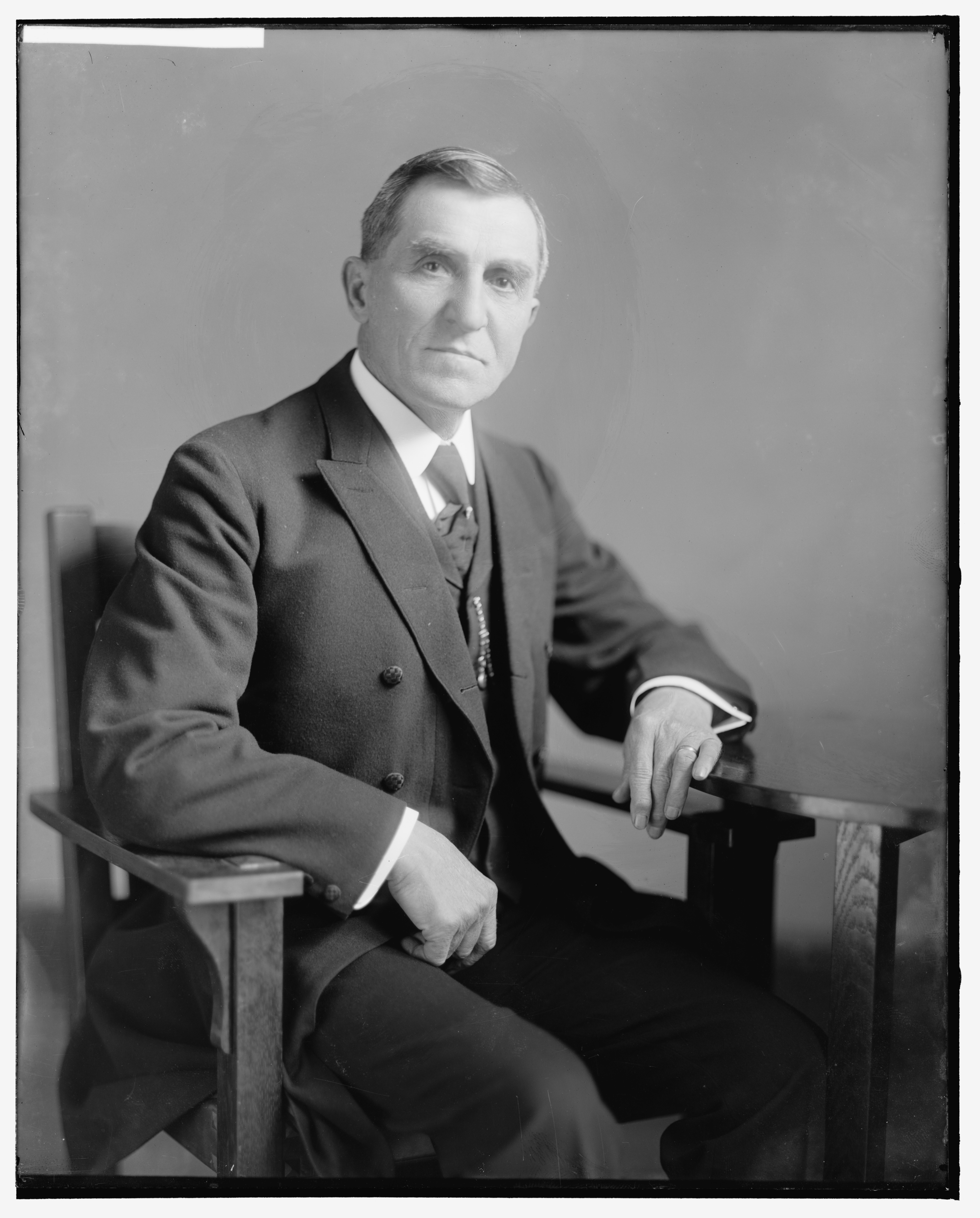
- Born: August 14, 1875; Waynesville, North Carolina
- Died: August 29, 1968 (aged 93); Lafayette, Louisiana
- Spouse: Mary Virginia McCormack
- Children: 3
- Military career
- Allegiance: United States
- Branch: United States Army
- Service years: 1897–1939; 1942
- Rank: Major General
- Service number: 0-540
- Conflicts: Spanish–American War; Philippine–American War; China Relief Expedition; World War I
- Awards: Army Distinguished Service Medal

Harley Bascom Ferguson (August 14, 1875 – August 29, 1968) was a United States Army officer in the late 19th and early 20th centuries. He served in several conflicts including the Spanish–American War and World War I, and he received the Distinguished Service Medal.

== Biography ==
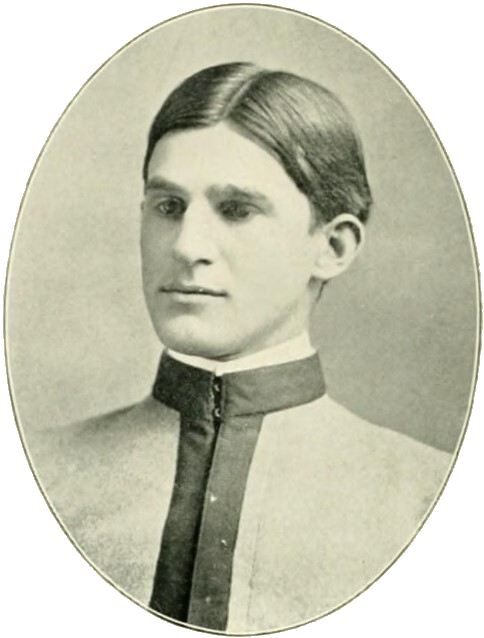
At West Point in 1897

Ferguson was born on August 14, 1875, in Waynesville, North Carolina, and received his early education in the local schools. He graduated seventh in his class from the United States Military Academy in June 1897 and was commissioned into the United States Army Corps of Engineers.

After serving in Cuba during the Spanish–American War, Ferguson participated in the Philippine–American War starting in 1899. He served as Chief Engineer during the China Relief Expedition in 1900. Ferguson graduated from the Army Staff College at Fort Leavenworth in July 1905. He served as the district engineer in Montgomery, Alabama from 1907 to 1909, and he served as the executive officer in charge of raising the USS Maine between 1910 and 1911. After returning to the U.S., Ferguson graduated from the Army War College in July 1913. He served as a district engineer in Milwaukee from 1913 to 1916.

During World War I in France, between September 12, 1917, and June 16, 1918, Ferguson commanded the 105th Engineers, and he served as the Second Corps Engineer from June 17, 1918, to October 3, 1918. He was promoted to the rank of brigadier general on August 8, 1918. Ferguson received the Distinguished Service Medal for his efforts in the war. The citation for the medal reads:

The President of the United States of America, authorized by Act of Congress, July 9, 1918, takes pleasure in presenting the Army Distinguished Service Medal to Brigadier General Harley Bascom Ferguson, United States Army, for exceptionally meritorious and distinguished services to the Government of the United States, in a duty of great responsibility during World War I. As Chief Engineer of the 2d Army Corps and later of the 2d Army, General Ferguson demonstrated high professional attainments and marked initiative. Through his foresight and skill in directing important technical operations he was a notable factor in the successes of the combat troops, rendering invaluable services to the American Expeditionary Forces.

After the war's end, Ferguson reverted to his permanent rank. He served in several positions, including as a district engineer in Pittsburgh in 1920 and in Cincinnati from 1927 to 1929. He graduated from a second course at the Army War College in June 1921. Ferguson also worked in the Office of the Assistant Secretary of War between 1921 and 1926, and he also served in New Orleans, Vicksburg, Mississippi, and Norfolk, Virginia. By 1930, he also was a member of the Saint Lawrence Waterway Board and the River and Harbors Board, and in 1932 he became the president of the Mississippi River Commission, again as a brigadier general. Ferguson was promoted to major general on December 3, 1934, and he retired from the army in 1939, though he was recalled to active duty in 1942.

Ferguson lived in Vicksburg as a retiree, and he died at Lafayette General Hospital in Lafayette, Louisiana, on August 29, 1968. He was interred at Calvary Cemetery in Lafayette.

== Personal life ==
Ferguson was the son of William Burder Ferguson and Laura Adelaide (Reeves) Ferguson. He was the fourth of their seven children. Two of his brothers were United States Naval Academy graduates.

Ferguson married Mary Virginia McCormack on January 3, 1907, and they had three children together.

== Bibliography ==
- Davis, Henry Blaine Jr. (1998). Generals in Khaki. Raleigh, North Carolina: Pentland Press. ISBN 1571970886. OCLC 40298151.
- Marquis Who's Who (1975). Who Was Who In American History – The Military. Chicago, Illinois: Marquis Who's Who. ISBN 0837932017.
