= Preston Brown (United States Army officer) =

United States Army general

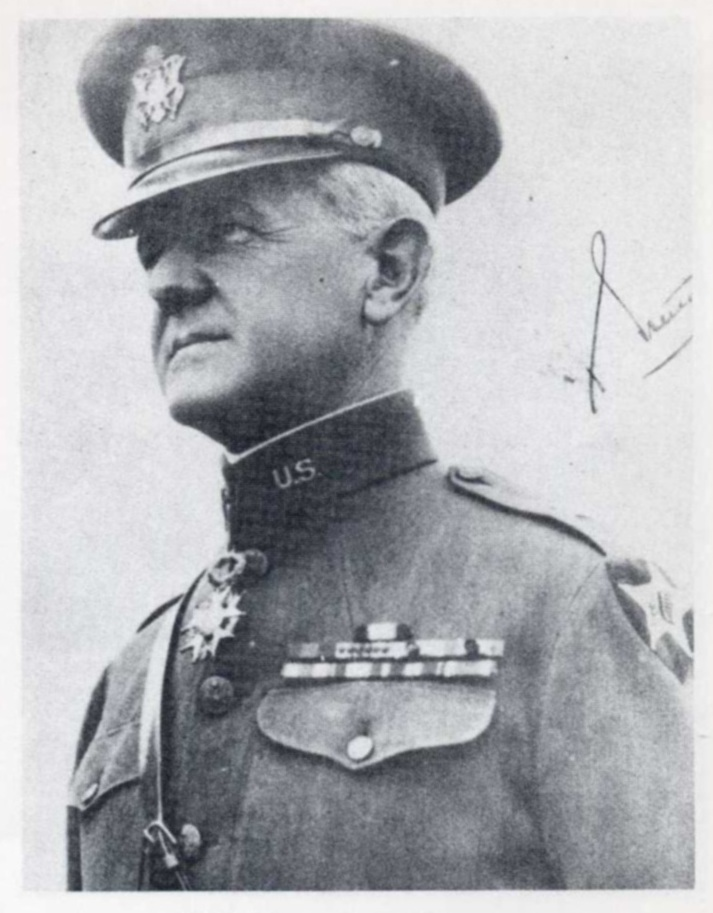
- Brigadier General Preston Brown
- Born: January 2, 1872; Lexington, Kentucky, U.S.
- Died: June 30, 1948 (aged 76); Vineyard Haven, Massachusetts, U.S.
- Military career
- Allegiance: United States
- Branch: U.S. Army
- Service years: 1892–1936
- Rank: Major General
- Units: 2nd Infantry Division; IV Corps
- Commands: 3rd Infantry Division; Sixth Corps Area
- Wars: World War I; Battle of Château-Thierry; Battle of Saint-Mihiel; Battle of Meuse-Argonne
- Awards: Distinguished Service Medal

Preston Brown (January 2, 1872 – June 30, 1948) was an American army officer who saw action with the American Expeditionary Forces in World War I. Brown reached the rank of major general before retiring from active duty in 1936.

== Early life ==
Brown was born in Lexington, Kentucky. His mother was Mary Owen Preston, who was the daughter of General William C. Preston of the Confederate Army, while his father John Mason Brown was a Union Army colonel. He attended Yale, where he served on the editorial board of The Yale Record. After his graduation in 1892, he also studied in the University of Virginia.

== Military career ==
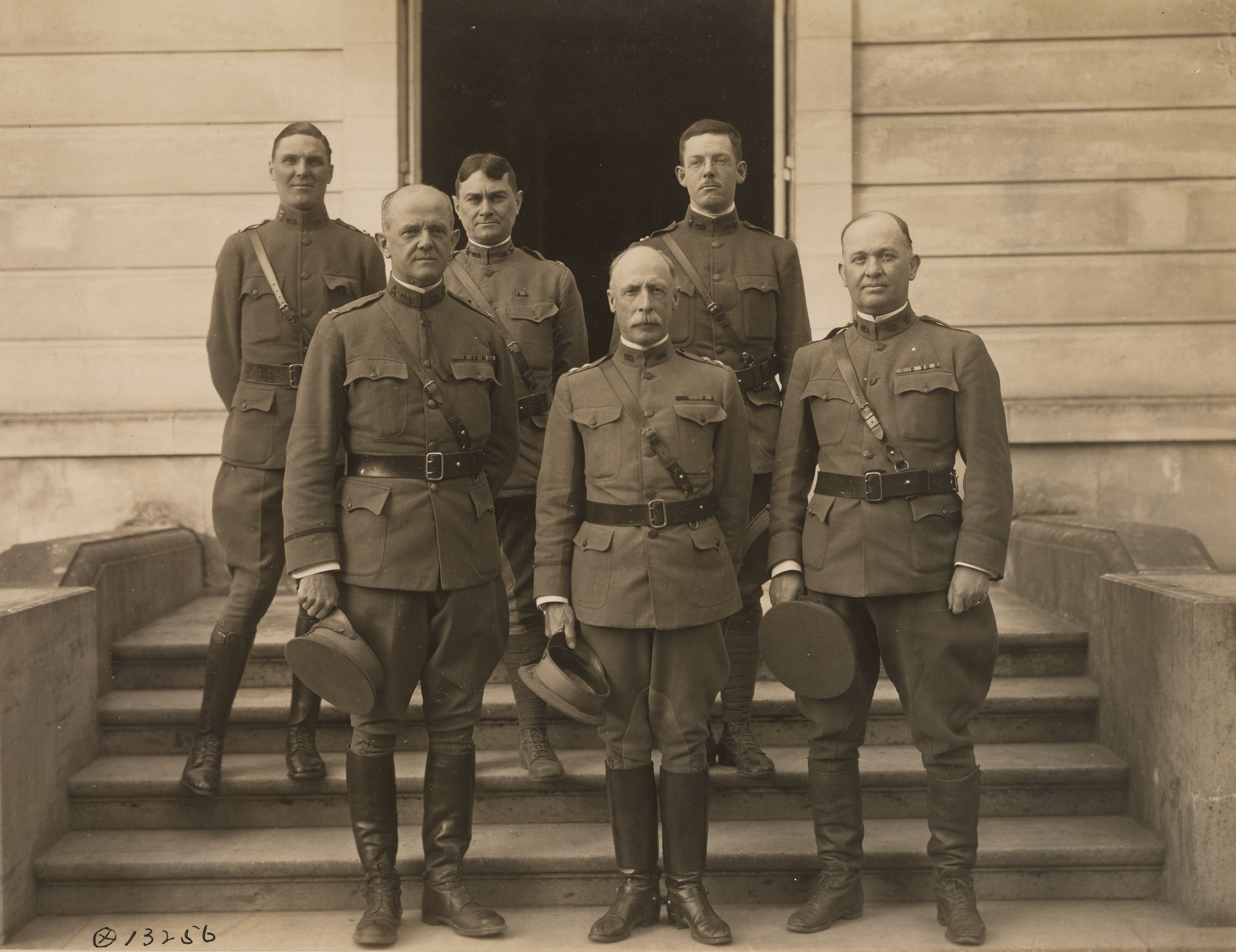
Major General Omar Bundy (center), commander of the U.S. 2nd Division, Colonel Preston Brown, the division's chief of staff, and other members of the division staff, pictured here at Chaumont-en-Vexin, France, May 28, 1918.

Brown entered the army as a private in 1894 and served in Battery A, Fifth Field Artillery. He was commissioned a second lieutenant in 1897 and rose through the ranks. He was promoted to major in 1916 and lieutenant colonel in 1917. In 1918, after the American entry into World War I, he was appointed a colonel in the National Army and in August of the same year was promoted to brigadier general.

He served as chief of staff of the 2nd Division at Château-Thierry and Saint-Mihiel between April 6–September 18, 1918, and was Chief of Staff of IV Corps between September 20–October 1918. On October 18, 1918, he became commander of the 3rd Division, serving in that capacity through the Battle of Meuse-Argonne. He was awarded the Army Distinguished Service Medal for his wartime service. The citation reads:

The President of the United States of America, authorized by Act of Congress, July 9, 1918, takes pleasure in presenting the Army Distinguished Service Medal to Brigadier General Preston Brown, United States Army, for exceptionally meritorious and distinguished services to the Government of the United States, in a duty of great responsibility during World War I. As chief of Staff of the 2d Division, General Brown directed the details of the battles near Chateau-Thierry, Soissons, and at the St. Mihiel salient with great credit. Later, in command of the 3d Division in the Argonne-Meuse offensive, at a most critical time, by his splendid judgment and energetic action, his division was able to carry to a successful conclusion the operations at Claire-Chene and at Hill 294.

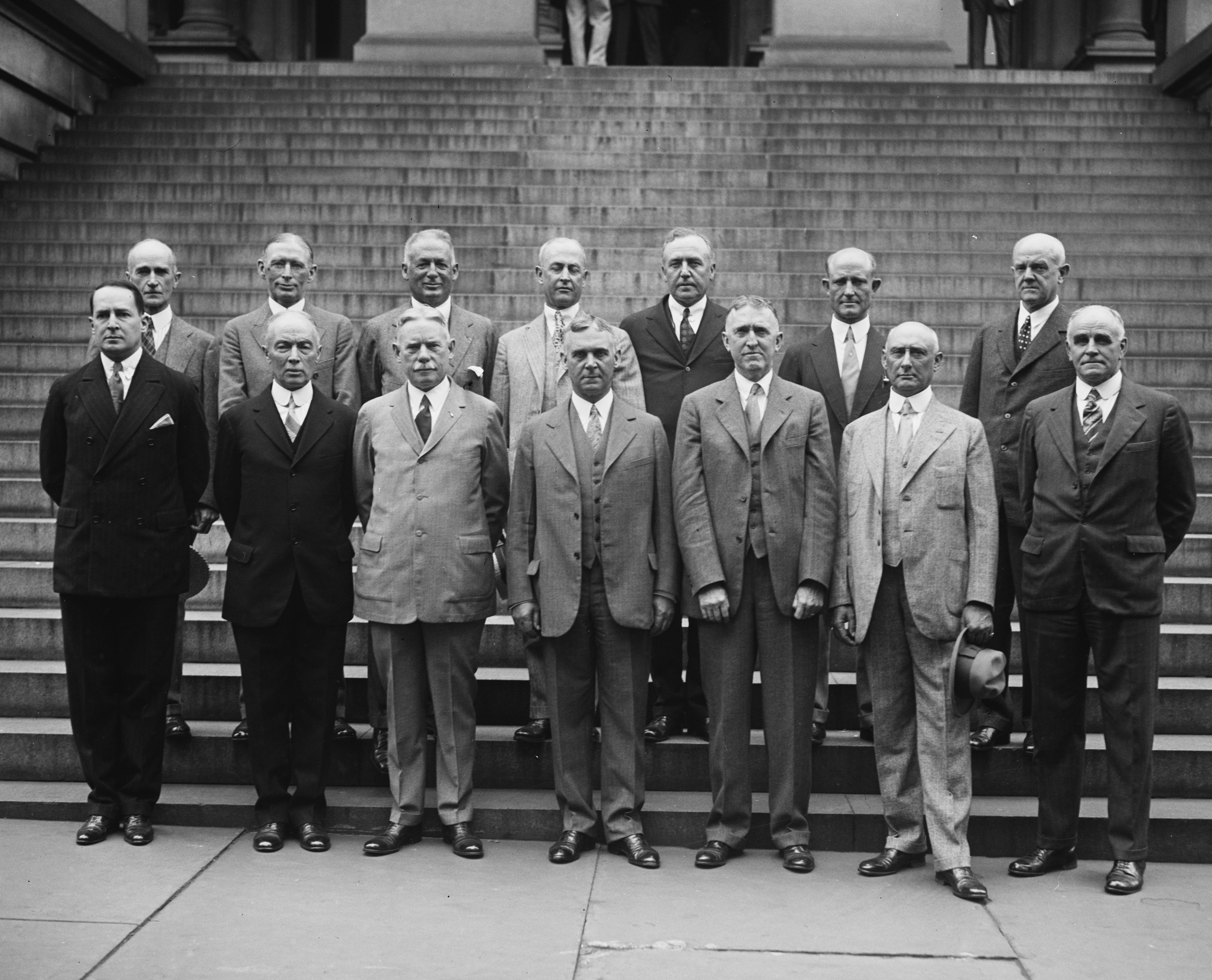
Corps area commanders and division commanders meet with the army chief of staff, Major General Charles Pelot Summerall, at the War Department, May 1927. Stood in the back row, on the extreme right, is Major General Preston Brown, commanding the First Corps Area.

In November 1918, he became assistant chief of staff at General Headquarters of the U.S. Army of Occupation. He was appointed an instructor at the Army General Staff College in 1919. In 1921, he was acting commander of the U.S. Army War College and in the same year was appointed commander of the 3rd Infantry Brigade. He commanded the First Corps Area from January 2, 1926, to March 9, 1930. Preston Brown was commander of the Panama Canal Zone from 1928 until 1932. From March to October 1930 he served as Deputy Chief of Staff of the United States Army. From October 1933 to October 1934 he commanded the Sixth Corps Area.

In 1927 he was elected as a hereditary member of the New Hampshire Society of the Cincinnati. He was also a hereditary companion of the Ohio Commandery of the Military Order of the Loyal Legion of the United States by right of his father's service in the Civil War.

Brown retired to Martha's Vineyard, Massachusetts in 1936, having reached the rank of major general.

== Personal life ==
In 1905, Brown married Susan Ford Dorrance. They had one child, Dorrance Brown who died in 1936.

Brown was active in genealogical research until his death. He was also a member of the Historical Society of Cincinnati.

== Death ==
Brown died in Vineyard Haven, Massachusetts on June 30, 1948.

== Awards ==
- Distinguished Service Medal
- Spanish War Service Medal
- Philippine Campaign Medal
- Mexican Border Service Medal
- World War I Victory Medal
- Commander, Legion of Honor (France)

== Bibliography ==
- Bullard, Robert Lee (2013). Fighting Generals: Illustrated Biographical Sketches of Seven Major Generals in World War I. Literary Licensing. ISBN 9781258861193.
- Clay, Steven E. (2010). US Army Order of Battle 1919–1941 (PDF). Vol. 1: The Arms: Major Commands and Infantry Organizations. Fort Leavenworth, KS: Combat Studies Institute Press.
- Davis, Henry Blaine Jr. (1998). Generals in Khaki. Raleigh, NC: Pentland Press, Inc. ISBN 1571970886.

Order of Battle of the United States Land Forces in the World War. Washington: US Government Printing Office, 1931.
