= List of commanders of 1st Infantry Division (United States) =

Shoulder sleeve insignia of the 1st Infantry Division.

This is a list of commanders of the 1st Infantry Division of the United States Army.

== Commanding Officers ==
- MG William L. Sibert June – December 1917
- MG Robert L. Bullard December 1917 – July 1918
- MG Charles P. Summerall July – October 1918
- BG Frank Parker October – November 1918
- MG Edward F. McGlachlin Jr. November 1918 – September 1919
- MG Charles P. Summerall October 1919 – June 1921
- MG David C. Shanks July – November 1921
- MG Charles T. Menoher November 1921 – January 1922
- MG Harry C. Hale February – December 1922
- BG William S. Graves December 1922 – July 1925
- BG Preston Brown July 1925 – January 1926
- BG Frank Parker January – May 1926
- BG Hugh A. Drum May 1926 – May 1927
- MG Fox Conner May – September 1927
- BG Hugh A. Drum September 1927 – January 1930
- BG William Payne Jackson January – March 1930
- MG Briant H. Wells March – September 1930
- BG Lucius R. Holbrook October 1930 – November 1935
- BG Charles DuVal Roberts November 1935 – February 1936
- MG Frank Parker February – March 1936
- MG Stanley H. Ford March – October 1936
- BG Perry L. Miles October 1936 – October 1937
- COL William P. Ennis November – December 1937
- BG Laurence Halstead December 1937 – January 1938
- MG Walter C. Short October 1938 – September 1939
- MG Karl Truesdell October 1939 – December 1940
- MG Donald C. Cubbison January 1941 – May 1942
- MG Terry Allen May 1942 – August 1943
- MG Clarence R. Huebner August 1943 – December 1944
- MG Clift Andrus December 1944 – May 1946
- MG Frank W. Milburn June 1946 – May 1949
- BG Ralph J. Canine May–September 1949
- MG John E. Dahlquist September 1949 – July 1951
- MG Thomas S. Timberman July 1951 – December 1952
- MG Charles T. Lanham January 1953 – June 1954
- MG Guy S. Meloy Jr. June 1954 – December 1955
- MG Willis S. Matthews January 1956 – April 1957
- MG David H. Buchanan April 1957 – October 1958
- BG Forrest Caraway October 1958 – December 1958
- MG Harvey H. Fischer December 1958 – January 1960
- BG John A. Seitz January 1960 – February 1960
- MG Theodore W. Parker February 1960 – May 1961
- BG John A. Berry Jr. May 1961 – June 1961
- BG William B. Kunzig July 1961 – August 1961
- MG John F. Ruggles August 1961 – January 1963
- MG Arthur W. Oberbeck January 1963 – January 1964
- MG Jonathan O. Seaman February 1964 – March 1966
- MG William E. DePuy March 1966 – December 1966
- MG John H. Hay January 1967 – February 1968
- MG Keith L. Ware February–September 1968
- MG Orwin C. Talbott September 1968 – August 1969
- MG Albert E. Milloy August 1969 – February 1970
- BG John Q. Henion March 1970 – April 1970
- MG Robert R. Linvill April 1970 – January 1971
- MG Edward M. Flanagan Jr. January 1971 – December 1972
- MG Gordon J. Duquemin January 1973 – August 1974
- MG Marvin D. Fuller August 1974 – May 1976
- MG Calvert P. Benedict May 1976 – May 1978
- MG Phillip Kaplan May 1978 – July 1980
- MG Edward A. Partain July 1980 – December 1982
- MG Neal Creighton, Sr. December 1982 – June 1984
- MG Ronald L. Watts June 1984 – April 1986
- MG Leonard P. Wishart III April 1986 – July 1988
- MG Gordon R. Sullivan July 1988 – July 1989
- MG Thomas Rhame July 1989 – August 1991
- MG William W. Hartzog August 1991 – July 1993
- MG Josue "Joe" Robles Jr. July 1993 – June 1994
- MG Randolph W. House June 1994 – February 1996
- MG Montgomery Meigs March 1996 – July 1997
- MG David L. Grange August 1997 – August 1999
- MG John P. Abizaid August 1999 – September 2000
- MG Bantz J. Craddock September 2000 – August 2002
- MG John R.S. Batiste August 2002 – June 2005
- MG Kenneth W. Hunzeker June 2005 – August 2006
- MG Carter F. Ham August 2006 – August 2007
- MG Robert E. Durbin July 2007 – July 2008
- BG Perry L. Wiggins July 2008 – April 2009
- MG Vincent K. Brooks April 2009 – May 2011
- MG William C. Mayville Jr. May 2011 – May 2013
- MG Paul E. Funk II May 2013 – July 2015
- MG Wayne W. Grigsby Jr. July 2015 – September 2016
- BG Pat Frank September 2016 (interim)
- MG Joseph M. Martin October 2016 – June 2018
- MG John S. Kolasheski June 2018 – August 2020
- BG John W. O'Connor Jr. August 2020 (interim)
- MG Douglas A. Sims II August 2020 – May 2022
- MG John V. Meyer III May 2022 – June 2024
- MG Monte L. Rone June 2024 – October 2026
- BG Kevin J. Williams October 2026 – present
