= Joe Robles =

American military general (1946–2024)

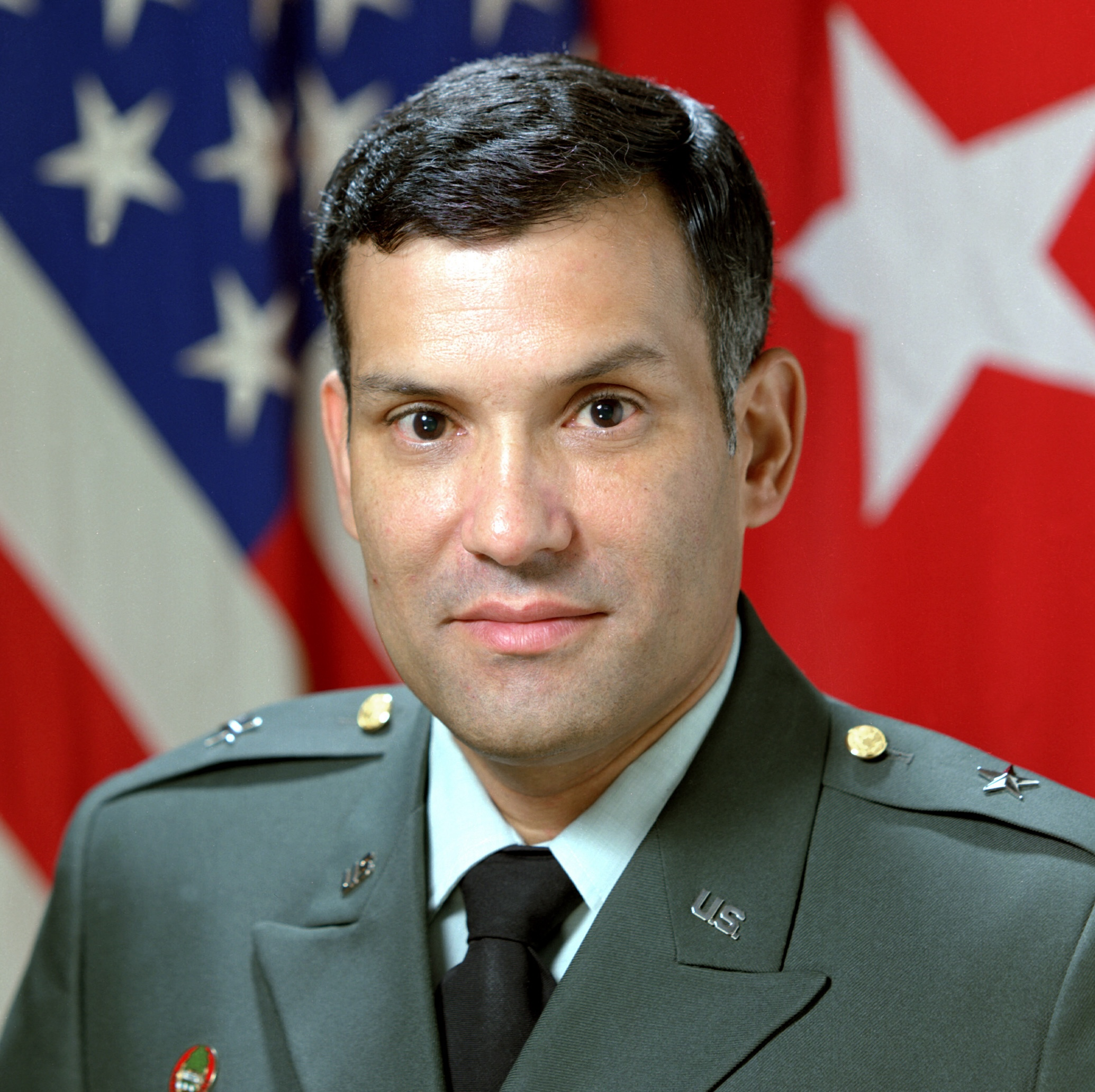
- Born: January 24, 1946; Rio Piedras, Puerto Rico
- Died: July 4, 2024 (aged 78); San Antonio, Texas, U.S.
- Burial place: Fort Sam Houston National Cemetery
- Military career
- Allegiance: United States of America
- Branch: United States Army
- Service years: 1966-1994
- Rank: Major General
- Commands: 1st Infantry Division
- Conflicts: Vietnam War
- Awards: Army Distinguished Service Medal; Legion of Merit (2); Bronze Star Medal; Meritorious Service Medal (1)
- Other work: Banking executive

Joe Robles (January 24, 1946 – July 4, 2024) was a United States Army general and banking executive American of Puerto Rican origin. He was the president and CEO of USAA from 2007 to 2015. He was born in Rio Piedras, Puerto Rico. After working at USAA, he worked for periods of time on the boards of Christus Santa Rosa Hospital and the P16Plus Council of Greater Bexar County Foundation, as well as working on the Base Realignment and Closure Commission.

== Education ==
Attended Kent State University in Ohio to earn a degree in accounting, and later to Indiana State University for a Master of Business Administration. From there Joe graduated from the Army General Staff College, the Spanish General Staff College, and the Naval War College in Newport, Rhode Island.

== Military career ==
Robles was drafted to the United States Army in 1966, completed his basic training at Fort Jackson, South Carolina. While there, his high test scores earned him a recommendation for Artillery Officer Candidate School in Fort Sill in Oklahoma. In 1967, as a newly commissioned second lieutenant, Robles was sent to Korea and then Vietnam. He worked at the Pentagon as a Colonel in the Army Budget Office. In 1986 at the age of 42 he was promoted Brigadier General and assigned as Assistant Division Commander with the 1st Cavalry Division at Fort Hood, Texas. In 1993 he was promoted to Major General in command of the 1st Infantry Division, at Fort Riley Kansas. Robles retired from the United States Army in 1994.

== Military decorations and awards ==
Army Staff Identification Badge

Army Distinguished Service Medal
Legion of Merit (with 2 Oak Leaf Clusters)
Bronze Star Medal
Meritorious Service Medal (with 1 Oak Leaf Cluster)
Air Medal
Army Commendation Medal (with 1 bronze Oak Leaf Cluster)
Army Good Conduct Medal
Meritorious Unit Commendation
National Defense Service Medal
Armed Forces Expeditionary Medal
Vietnam Service Medal (with 4 bronze Service Stars)
Army Service Medal
Army Overseas Service Ribbon (with award numeral 2)
Vietnam Gallantry Cross Unit Citation with Palm
Vietnam Civil Actions Medal
Vietnam Campaign Medal

== Death ==
He died on July 4, 2024, at the age of 78. He was buried with full military honors at Fort Sam Houston National Cemetery

Military offices
Preceded by William W. Hartzog	Commanding General, 1st Infantry Division; July 1993 – June 1994	Succeeded by Randolph W. House
