= Battle of Bayang =

1902 Moro Rebellion battle

- Part of the Moro Rebellion
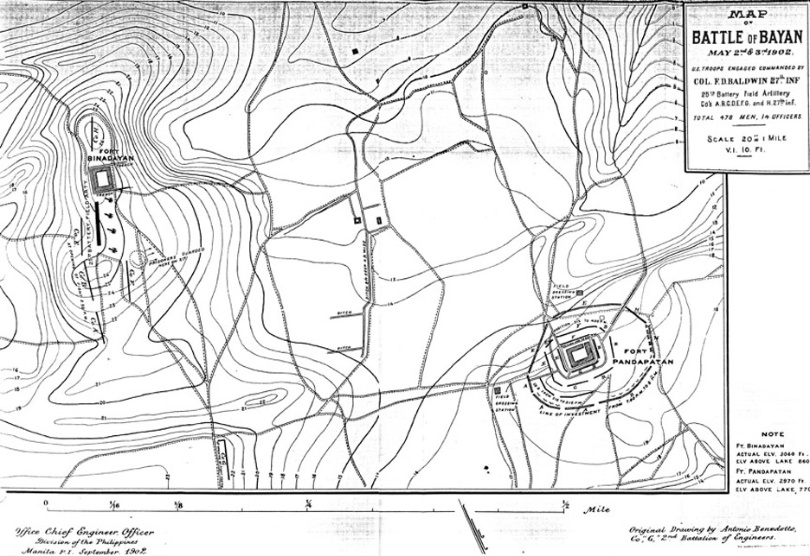
| Date | May 2–3, 1902 |
| Location | Sultan Pandapatan, Bayang, Lanao, Near Malabang, South of Lake Lanao, Mindanao |
| Result | American victory: Beginning of the Moro Rebellion |

Belligerents
| United States | Sultanates of Lanao |

Commanders and leaders
| Frank D. Baldwin; Hugh Drum; 1st Lt. Thomas Vicars † | Sultan Pandapatan |

Strength
| 1,200 men 4 mountain guns | About 600 Maranao warriors 2 forts |

Casualties and losses
| 18 killed 42 wounded | 400–500 killed 9 captured 39 escaped |

The Battle of Bayang (Maranao: Padang Karbala) was the first major engagement of the Moro Rebellion. It was a punitive expedition led by Colonel Frank D. Baldwin in retaliation for murders committed by Moros in Malabang and Parang on the island of Mindanao. Col. Baldwin led seven companies of the 27th Infantry and the 25th Battery Light Artillery against the Moros on the south shore of Lake Lanao, the village of Bayang in particular. The Americans took Fort Pandapatan and the fort of Datu of Binidayan, killing the Sultan of Bayang in the process.

== Background ==
The Moros accused the Americans of trying to convert them from Islam to Christianity, just like the Spanish attempts, and held a grudge from 1900 when troops under Lt. Col. L. M. Brett killed Datu Amirul. There was also a misunderstanding as to the extension of the Bates Agreement of 1899 to mainland Mindanao in which the Americans thought they had established sovereignty by getting the signature of the Sultan of Sulu. The Moros of Lanao is another sovereign and thought they can continue their rule.

Right before the American insular government in the Philippines were about to declare the Philippines "pacified" or "assimilated", incidents of violence in the southern Island of Mindanao sparked the opening of a whole new front of the recently concluded Philippine–American War, the so-called Moro rebellion had begun. Although Generals like Leonard Wood attempted to negotiate with the local Datus of Moroland, some Datus were not interested in giving up their sovereignty to these new colonizers, hostilities almost immediately broke out with minor incidents of murder and stealing of weapons from the Americans stationed there. The expedition to Bayang was said to be a retaliation to two murders, three weeks apart, the perpetrators were Moros or Muslim Filipinos who were hoping to obtain the Americans' Krag–Jørgensen rifles. In response, Baldwin took his entire command of 1,025 men on the expedition and added the 25th Battery of the Field Artillery (65 men), ten six-mule teams and 40 pack mules run by contract civilian packers, and 300 hired cargadores. 600 men of the 10th and 17th Infantry Regiments were moved to Malabang as temporary replacements for his forces and to serve as a reserve.

== March to Bayang ==
By late April, Baldwin had established a base at the port of Malabang, and planned to march north along the Matling River to Lake Lanao. They set up headquarters at the old Spanish fort called "Corcuera". As they marched towards Bayang, they encountered thick jungles, seemingly bottomless mud pits and tropical diseases like malaria plagued the expedition, from there, the Americans knew that they were going to encounter an entirely different kind of warfare in Mindanao, superior arms was an advantage for the American army; however, the combat in Mindanao would often be fought at hand-to-hand confrontations and suicidal, so-called juramentado and amok attacks.

Once they finally reached the two forts at Bayang and Pandapatan, the number of effective guns had dropped to 600 and they had lost their Maguindanao cargadores and replaced them with an additional 40 pack mules, 80 in total. When they got to know that the beans in cans had a mix of pork in it, the bearers refused to carry the American rations of canned pork and beans. The American force reached the lake after a trek of seventeen days over thirty-two miles. Establishing a camp two miles from Bayang on May 1, Baldwin sent an ultimatum to the Sultan asking for the surrender of the murderers of his soldiers.

As they observed the high ridge overlooking Lake Lanao where the two forts or "cottas" were built upon, some 1,000 yards apart, The American commanders quickly began planning for the assault, sending reconnaissance parties to gather information on the forts and their defenses, the first and highest fort was called "Binidayan" the bastion of the Sultan of Bayang who openly wrote against the American occupation and called for armed rebellion, on this fort they could see Maranao riflemen perched on the walls, the red flag of the Maranaos symbolizing a state of war was seen flying over both forts. The larger cotta, named Pandapatan was the main defense of the Maranao army, under their war leader, the Sultan of Pandapatan.

=== Assault on Binidayan cotta ===
Fifteen minutes after the ultimatum expired at noon, Baldwin's men—Company F (1st Lt. Thomas Vicars) and Company H (Captain Samuel Lyon)—started their attack of the Moro fort on Lempesses Hill. The siege of Binidayan lasted about an hour, the Americans first tried firing over the parapets to cut down the defenders on the walls, afterwards, they charged the fort, after an hour the Americans captured the fort, with only 1 American killed and a small number of Moros killed. As the Americans discovered, The Sultan of Bayang and the remaining 600 men (including 150 men sent by other Datus) had moved across the valley to the larger Pandapatan cotta, where they prepared for the impending assault. Knowing that the Americans easily captured the higher fort, they prepared for a heavy beating, but with the Moros having the main advantage, they were confident in their defense.

=== Capture of Pandapatan cotta ===
Proceeding to the second fort, the Americans crossed three trench lines and surrounded the fort by 4 PM. The Moros set up an impressive defense of the cotta, with deep trenches five feet deep surrounding the cotta, and the stone walls surrounded by sharpened bamboo stakes along with concealed pits filled with sharpened bamboo; the defense of Pandapatan was poised to halt the advancing Americans.

When the Americans commenced their assault, they managed to take out a number of defenders on the walls of the fort, but lacking scaling ladders and running low on ammunition, Hugh A. Drum led an attempt to scale the walls.

Company F assaulted the main gate of the fortification, and there a fierce counterattack was launched by the Moros. Company F commanding officer 1st Lieutenant Thomas Vicars was suddenly decapitated by lantaka fire, halting the American advance.

Though the Americans inflicted heavy casualties on the Moros, the close-up hand-to-hand battle outside the walls continued until sunset, when the Americans retreated under the cover of night. On the way back to camp near the ruins of the Binidayan cotta, flashes of lightning, accompanied by heavy fog and a deluge of rain made life miserable for the Americans. As the Americans withdrew to Binidayan, the 25th Field Artillery courageously crawled on to the battlefield and retrieved the dead and wounded, although they were beaten back and suffering from heavy rain and fog, they inflicted massive damage to the fort and to the morale of the Moros defending it.

As the fog cleared, the next morning dawned sunny to reveal the red battle flags replaced by four white flags. The Americans occupied the fort by 6 AM and took eighty-three prisoners, but the sultan and his chief lieutenant were killed trying to escape. The fort was later destroyed by American forces.

== Aftermath ==
The prisoners tried to escape at 1 PM, resulting in all but nine being killed. President Theodore Roosevelt on May 5 sent his thanks for the men who "carried our flag to victory."

Both forts were dismantled by the Americans, and looting of Moro blades like the kris and kampilan, this practice of taking "souvenirs" from battle sites became common place among Americans fighting in Moroland. This first battle at Bayang became the rallying call of the Moros across Mindanao, with the continuing presence of American troops sparking various uprisings and attacks across the islands of Sulu, the Lanao lake and the Cotabato Basin.

Camp Vicars (thus named after the slain Company F commander, 1st Lieutenant Thomas Vicars) was established by the Americans the next day near where the forts were located and John J. Pershing assumed command. Pershing made punitive expeditions against the Sultan Uali of Butig on September 18 to 22, 1902 and the Sultan Cabugatan of Masiu on September 29 to October 3, 1902.

This was followed by expeditions against Bacolod, April 6 to 8, 1903, and Calahui, April 9 to 10, on the western shore of the lake, and Taraka, May 4 to 5, on the eastern shore. In the meantime, a supply road was built by Robert Lee Bullard's men from Iligan to Camp Marahui on Lake Lanao.

== Reactions ==
The battle was lauded by the American press and the Roosevelt Administration as a signal victory, the resisting Maranaos described as having been "thoroughly whipped" and taught a "salutary lesson" after losing between 300 and 400 killed versus eleven killed and forty severely wounded for the Americans. But Baldwin's immediate superior, Brigadier General George W. Davis, and the commanding officer of the Philippine Department, Major General Adna Chaffee, were greatly upset and angered by Baldwin's conduct; believing he had acted impetuously, with insubordination, and ineptly, which could have easily ended in a major disaster. Behind the scenes President Roosevelt was furious with General Chaffee for having apparently allowed an entirely new front to open up just as he was about to proclaim the Philippine Islands were finally pacified and peaceful after a grinding, 3 1/2-year-long, less than popular war. In addition it undercut a slower yet progressively more successful attempt initiated by Davis to negotiate a peaceful solution through the efforts of Captain John J. Pershing. In fact Chaffee believed that had it not been for Pershing's last minute success in convincing the most powerful datus at the north end of the lake not to join in the defense of Bayang, Baldwin's expedition might have been a disaster. This prompted Chaffee towards an exceptional decision; to see to it that Baldwin was promoted up and out of Moroland and to turn over the Lanao mission to this same unknown junior officer.

== Legacy ==
The battle locally known as the Padang Karbala by the Maranaos is regarded as an instance of Moro resistance against imperialism and colonization of the United States and as a proof of ethnic nationalism. The Maranaos regard the casualties in the Moro side in the battle as martyrs. A bill has been proposed in the Bangsamoro Parliament recognizing May 2 as Padang Karbala Day as a means to commemorate the historic battle.
