= Patrick J. Donahoe =

US Army general

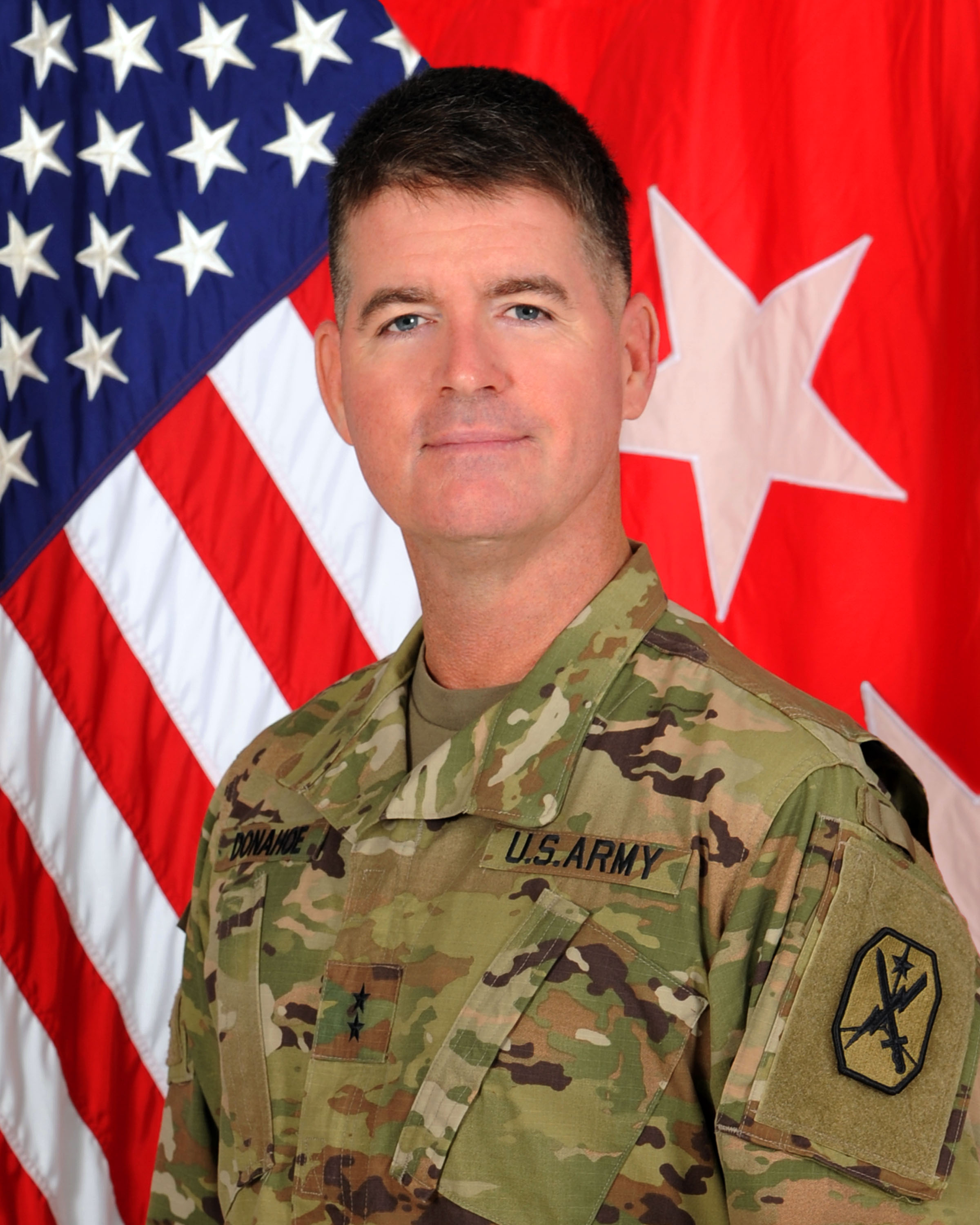
- Born: Edison, New Jersey, U.S.
- Education: Villanova University (BA); United States Naval War College; Harvard Kennedy School (MSS)
- Spouse: Theresa Donahoe
- Children: 3
- Military career
- Allegiance: United States of America
- Branch: United States Army
- Service years: 1989–2023
- Rank: Major General
- Commands: United States Army Maneuver Center of Excellence/Fort Benning; 4th Cavalry Brigade; 1st Battalion, 67th Armored Regiment, 4th Infantry Division
- Conflicts: War in Afghanistan
- Awards: Defense Superior Service Medal; Legion of Merit (3); Bronze Star Medal

Patrick J. Donahoe is a retired United States Army major general who last served as the Commanding General of the United States Army Maneuver Center of Excellence and Fort Benning from July 17, 2020, to July 14, 2022. As the MCoE commander, Donahoe was responsible for the command and administration of the Army's branch specialty academies. He previously served as deputy commanding general for operations of the Eighth United States Army. Donahoe initiated his retirement upon an investigation into alleged misconduct focused on his social media use. Donahoe had publicly disagreed with Fox News host Tucker Carlson who had said that the Department of Defense was "feminizing" the military through uniform policy changes for women.

Military offices
Preceded by ???	Commander of the 4th Cavalry Brigade; 201?–2012	Succeeded by John Prairie
Preceded by John Marr	Chief of Staff of the United States Army Maneuver Center of Excellence; 2014–2016	Succeeded by Andrew Cole Jr.
Preceded by Jeffery D. Broadwater	Director of Future Operations of Resolute Support Mission; 2016–2017	Succeeded by ???
Preceded by ???	Deputy Commanding General of the 10th Mountain Division; 2017–2018	Succeeded by ???
Preceded by Viet X. Luong	Deputy Commanding General for Operations of the Eighth United States Army; 2018–2020	Succeeded by Trevor J. Bredenkamp
Preceded by Gary M. Brito	Commanding General of the United States Army Maneuver Center of Excellence; 2020–2022	Succeeded by Curtis A. Buzzard
