= Hugh Aloysius Drum =

United States Army general

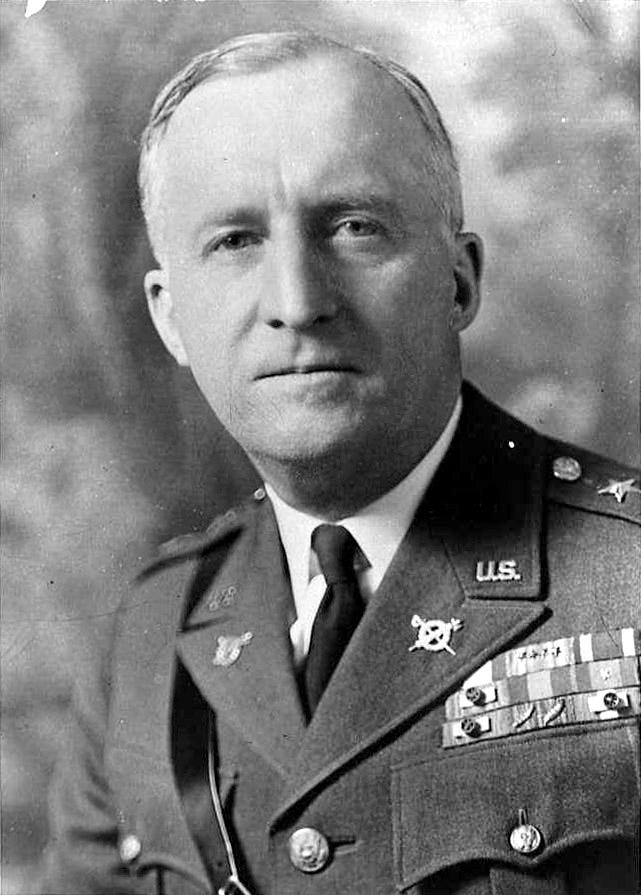
- Hugh Aloysius Drum
- Born: September 19, 1879; Fort Brady, Chippewa County, Michigan, US
- Died: October 3, 1951 (aged 72); New York City, US
- Burial place: Arlington National Cemetery
- Education: Boston College (Bachelor of Arts, 1921)
- Spouse: Mary Reaume (m. 1903–1951, his death)
- Military career
- Allegiance: United States
- Branch: United States Army; New York Guard
- Service years: 1898–1943 (Army); 1943–1948 (New York Guard)
- Rank: Lieutenant General (Army); Lieutenant General (New York Guard); General (New York Guard, retired)
- Service number: 0-89
- Unit: U.S. Army Infantry Branch
- Commands: New York Guard; Eastern Defense Command; Second Corps Area; First United States Army; Hawaiian Department; Fifth Corps Area; 1st Infantry Division; 1st Infantry Brigade; United States Army Command and General Staff College
- Conflicts: Philippine–American War; Veracruz Expedition; Pancho Villa Expedition; World War I World War II
- Awards: Army Distinguished Service Medal (2); Silver Star
- Other work: President, Empire State Inc.

Hugh Aloysius Drum (September 19, 1879 – October 3, 1951) was a career United States Army officer who served in World War I and World War II and attained the rank of lieutenant general. He was notable for his service as chief of staff of the First United States Army during World War I, and commander of First Army during the initial days of World War II.

Drum was attending Boston College when his father, Captain John Drum, was killed in action in Cuba on July 1, 1898, during the Spanish–American War. Offered a direct commission in the United States Army, Drum was appointed a second lieutenant of Infantry. He served in the Philippines during the Philippine–American War, took part in the Battle of Bayan, and received the Silver Star for heroism. He continued to advance through positions of more rank and responsibility in the early 1900s, and took part in the Veracruz and Pancho Villa Expeditions.

During World War I, Drum served as chief of staff for First United States Army, and led the planning for First Army's participation in the Saint Mihiel and Meuse-Argonne offensives. He was promoted to temporary brigadier general and received the Army Distinguished Service Medal. After the war, Drum commanded 1st Infantry Brigade, 1st Infantry Division, Fifth Corps Area, and the Hawaiian Department. Having served as the Army's deputy chief of staff and inspector general, Drum was a candidate for Army Chief of Staff in 1939 but the position went to George C. Marshall.

Drum received promotion to lieutenant general in August 1939, and commanded the Eastern Defense Command during the early years of World War II. He reached the mandatory retirement age of 64 in 1943, after which he was commander of the New York Guard (1943–1948), and president of Empire State, Inc., the company that managed the Empire State Building (1944–1951).

Drum died in New York City on October 3, 1951. He was buried at Arlington National Cemetery.

== Early life ==
Born at Fort Brady, Chippewa County, Michigan, on September 19, 1879, Hugh A. Drum was the son of Margaret (Desmond) Drum (1846–1927) of Boston and Captain John Drum (1840–1898), a career army officer who was killed in Cuba while serving with the 10th Infantry Regiment during the Spanish–American War.

In 1894, Drum graduated from Xavier High School in New York City, which he had attended while his father was an instructor at the school. Initially intent upon a career as a Jesuit priest, he enrolled at Boston College. Under the provisions of a recently passed law allowing recognition for sons of officers who displayed exceptional bravery during the Spanish–American War, Drum was offered a direct commission as a second lieutenant on September 9, 1898, which he accepted. (He received his Bachelor of Arts degree from Boston College in 1921.)

== Start of military career ==
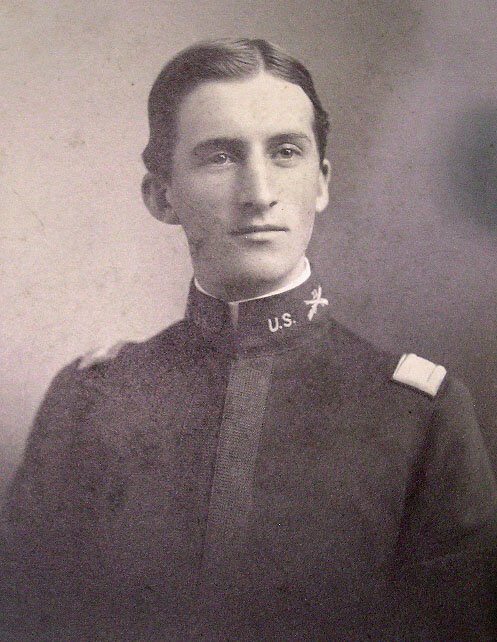
Drum in 1902.

Joining the United States Army while the Spanish–American War and subsequent insurrections and conflicts were ongoing, he served with the 12th Infantry Regiment in the Philippines, and then with the 25th Infantry Regiment. He participated in the Battle of Bayan in 1899, for which he received the Silver Citation Star, which was converted to the Silver Star when that decoration was created in 1932.

Drum later served as aide-de-camp to Frank Baldwin before returning to a series of assignments in the United States. He completed the School of the Line (precursor to the Officer Basic and Advanced Courses) in 1911 as an honor graduate. He graduated from the United States Army Command and General Staff College in 1912, and later served there as an instructor.

In 1914 he was an assistant chief of staff for the force commanded by Frederick Funston during the Veracruz Expedition. Drum served at Fort Bliss and Fort Sam Houston in Texas during 1915 and 1916 as part of the Pancho Villa Expedition. It was serving at these locations that brought Drum into contact with Major General John J. Pershing, who thought highly of him, and "saw that he had talent as a staff officer".

== World War I ==
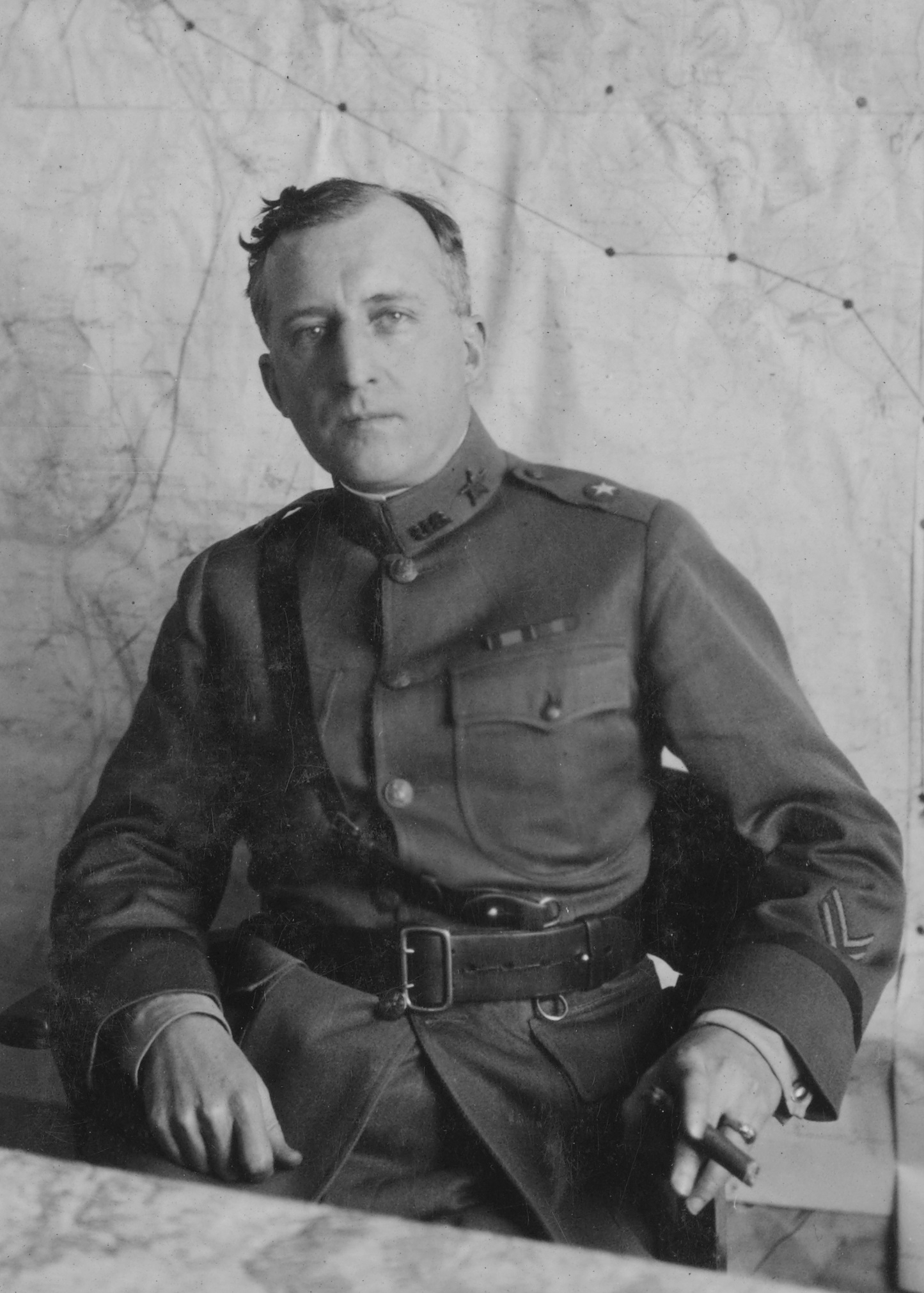
Brigadier General Drum as First Army chief of staff in November 1918

At the start of America's involvement in World War I, Pershing named Drum an assistant chief of staff of the First Army, commanded first by Pershing and later by Lieutenant General Hunter Liggett. In 1918, he was promoted to colonel and became First Army chief of staff. He was promoted to temporary brigadier general in the last weeks of the war. Drum was commended for his work to assemble and organize First Army's staff, and for the planning of the St. Mihiel and Meuse-Argonne offensives in September 1918, for which he received the Army Distinguished Service Medal and awards from several foreign countries. The citation for his Army DSM reads:

The President of the United States of America, authorized by Act of Congress, July 9, 1918, takes pleasure in presenting the Army Distinguished Service Medal to Brigadier General Hugh Aloysius Drum, United States Army, for exceptionally meritorious and distinguished services to the Government of the United States, in a duty of great responsibility during World War I. Upon General Drum, as Chief of Staff of the 1st Army, devolved the important duty of organizing the headquarters of this command and of coordinating the detailed staff work in its operations in the St. Mihiel and Argonne-Meuse offensives. His tact, zeal, and high professional attainments had a marked influence on the success that attended the operations of the 1st Army.

Orders: War Department, General Orders No. 12 (1919)

== Between the World Wars ==
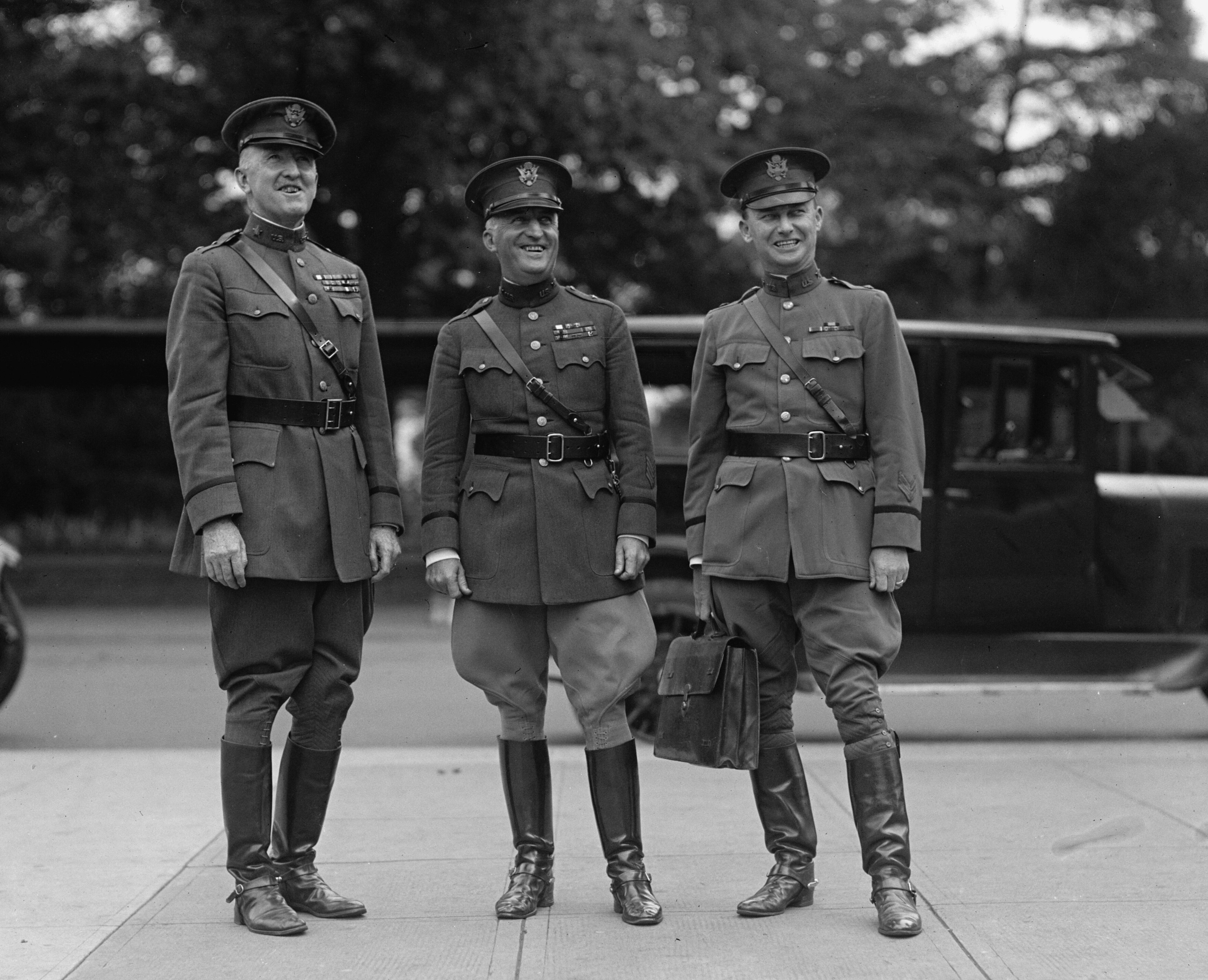
Major General John L. Hines, Brigadier General Hugh A. Drum and Major Francis B. Wilby at Capitol Hill, 1925.

After the war, Drum served as the director of training and assistant commandant for the School of the Line at Fort Leavenworth, Kansas, and commandant of the Command and General Staff College, where he taught the doctrine of open warfare—stressing maneuver and marksmanship over frontal attacks and firepower, using experienced troops, and supported by large artillery barrages—that the American Expeditionary Forces had attempted to practice in France.

From there he went to the Army staff at the War Department in Washington, D.C., where he publicly clashed with General Billy Mitchell about the disposition of the U.S. Army Air Service. During their repeated confrontations, which stretched over several years, Drum successfully lobbied Congress not to have the Air Service organized separately from the army.

From 1926 to 1927, Drum commanded 1st Infantry Brigade, 1st Infantry Division, and he was the division commander from May 1926 to May 1927. He served again as commander of the 1st Infantry Division from September 1927 to January 1930. From 1930 to 1931, Drum was the Inspector General of the US Army. Drum was promoted to major general when he assumed his duties as inspector general on January 29, 1930.

In 1931 Drum was assigned as commander of the Fifth Corps Area, based at Fort Hayes, Ohio. Drum returned to Washington in 1933 to serve as deputy to the Army's Chief of Staff, Douglas MacArthur. He headed a board of senior officers that again sought to suppress advocates of an independent air force by setting the ceiling on Air Corps requirements for numbers of aircraft and tying any funding for expansion of the Air Corps to prior funding of the other branches first. In 1934, all the members of the Drum Board also sat on the presidential-initiated Baker Board, again setting its agenda to preclude any discussion of air force independence.

In 1935, Drum was a candidate for chief of staff, but Malin Craig was selected. From 1935 to 1937, Drum commanded the Hawaiian Department. It was during Drum's posting in Hawaii that he renewed acquaintance with another ambitious officer, George S. Patton, who served as his assistant chief of staff for intelligence (G2), and with whom he had a contentious professional relationship. At a polo match in which Patton was playing, Drum was among the spectators and rebuked Patton for his use of angry profanity during the game. The civilian players, who were members of Hawaii's wealthy elite on friendly terms with the equally wealthy and elite Patton, humiliated Drum by standing up for Patton.

In 1938, Drum succeeded James K. Parsons as commander of First Army and assumed command of Second Corps Area headquartered at Fort Jay, Governors Island, New York. When Craig retired in 1939, Drum was again a candidate for chief of staff. He wanted the position badly enough to set aside his feud with Patton and ask Patton to intercede with the retired but still influential John J. Pershing, their old mentor. Despite these efforts, Drum was passed over in favor of George C. Marshall. Though disappointed at not being selected, Drum was still highly enough regarded that he received promotion to lieutenant general in August 1939.

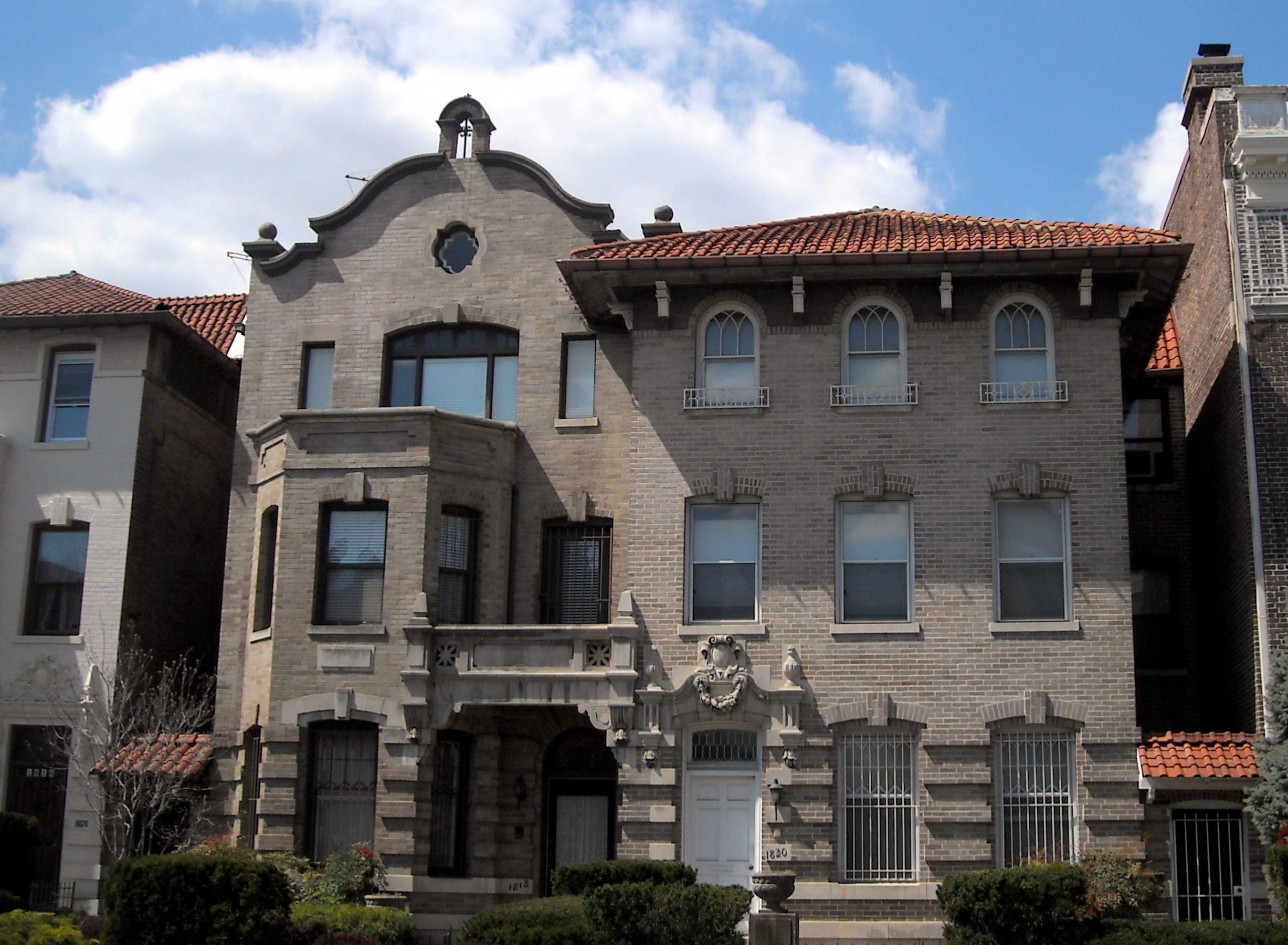
Drum's former residence (right) in Washington, D.C.

== World War II ==
With the onset of preparations for World War II, Drum assumed command of the Eastern Defense Command, responsible for domestic defense along the Atlantic seaboard. During the 1941 Carolina Maneuvers, Drum commanded First Army. He was embarrassed and became the subject of mockery when he was captured on the first day by troops of the 2nd Armored Division under Patton's command. After soldiers from Isaac D. White's battalion detained Drum, the exercise umpires ruled that the circumstances would not have transpired in combat, so he was allowed to return to his headquarters, enabling the exercise to continue and Drum to save face. Despite the umpires' actions, the incident indicated to senior leaders that Drum might not be prepared to command large bodies of troops under the modern battlefield conditions the Army would face in World War II, so he was not considered for field command. (Note: Drum's capture was the inspiration for a scene in the 1967 film The Dirty Dozen.)

== Retirement ==
After the Carolina Maneuvers, Drum was disappointed with an offer from Secretary of War Henry L. Stimson to go on what he perceived to be a low-profile assignment as chief of staff for the Chinese army of Chiang Kai-Shek. After declining the China mission, Drum continued as head of the Eastern Defense Command, which was expanded into the Eastern Military Area with the inclusion of U.S. bases in Bermuda and Newfoundland. He remained in this assignment until reaching the mandatory retirement age in September 1943. At his retirement, Drum received a second award of the Army Distinguished Service medal; the award was presented by Stimson, and the citation was read by Marshall.

As Commander of the First Army and Eastern Defense Command, Lieutenant General Hugh A. Drum has, by his leadership, judgment and high professional attainments, rendered exceptionally meritorious service during the period of the declared national emergency and the present war. He amalgamated the military and civilian elements in his theater into a smoothly operating organization, providing adequate defense for this critical area, with a minimum expenditure of military means. He directed large-scale maneuvers conspicuous for their reality and well-conceived execution, and participated as a commander in such maneuvers to the advantage of the troops concerned, whose training was reflected in their subsequent successes in battle. General Drum’s service in the exercise of his high command has made a material contribution to the development of the Army of the United States and the measures for the security of the eastern frontier of this continent.
GENERAL ORDERS: War Department, General Orders No. 69 (1943)

== Post military career ==
Drum was the commander of the New York Guard from 1943 to 1948. During the war, the New York Guard took on many responsibilities normally performed by the National Guard, in addition to internal security measures such as protecting key facilities from saboteurs and developing plans to respond if such an event occurred. When Drum retired from command in September 1948, Governor Thomas E. Dewey promoted him to general (four stars) on the New York Guard's retired list. From 1944 until his death, he was the president of Empire State, Inc., the company that managed the Empire State Building.

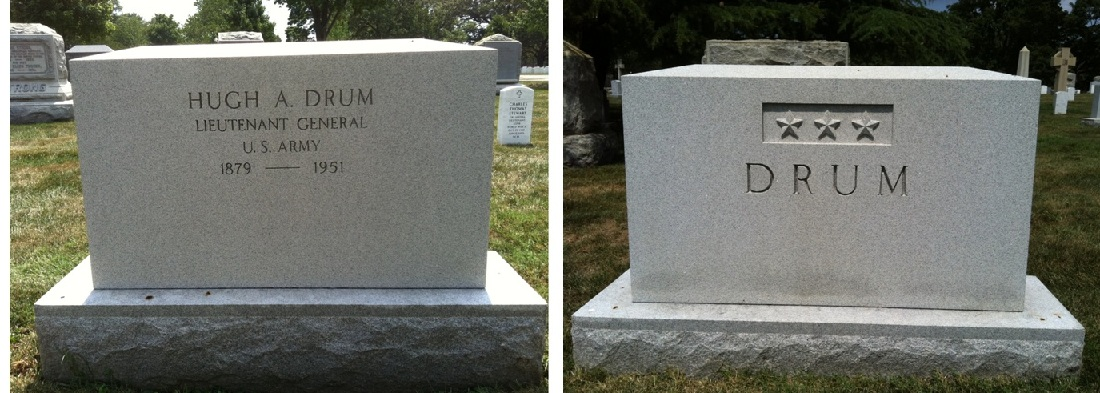
Drum's gravestone at Arlington National Cemetery.

Drum died in New York City on October 3, 1951. His funeral mass was celebrated at St. Patrick's Cathedral by Cardinal Francis Spellman. Drum was buried at Arlington National Cemetery, Section 3, Site 1447-R.

== Family ==
In 1903, Drum married Mary Reaume (1877–1960). They were the parents of a daughter, Anna Carroll Drum (1916–1996), nicknamed "Peaches," who was the wife of Army officer Thomas H. Johnson Jr.

== Legacy ==
The Hugh A. Drum Papers collection includes correspondence, diaries, newspaper clippings, memorandums and other official documents. It is maintained at the U. S. Army Heritage and Education Center in Carlisle, Pennsylvania.

In 1951 Pine Camp, an Army training site near Watertown, New York, was renamed Camp Drum in General Drum's honor. The post is now known as Fort Drum, and is home to the Army's 10th Mountain Division.

== Awards and honors ==
=== United States military decorations and medals ===
- Army Distinguished Service Medal with oak leaf cluster
- Silver Star
- Spanish War Service Medal
- Philippine Campaign Medal
- Mexican Border Service Medal
- World War I Victory Medal with four campaign stars
- Army of Occupation of Germany Medal
- American Defense Service Medal
- American Campaign Medal
- World War II Victory Medal.
- Conspicuous Service Cross (number 7492), awarded by the State of New York in November 1948 by right of his having received the Silver Star.

=== Foreign orders and decorations ===
His foreign decorations included the French Croix de Guerre, French Legion of Honor (Commander), Belgium's Order of the Crown (Commander), and Italy's Order of the Crown.

=== Other honors ===
Drum was inducted into the Xavier High School Hall of Fame in 1931.

Drum was a member of the Scabbard and Blade Society.

In 1940, he received the Laetare Medal, awarded by the University of Notre Dame annually to recognize individuals who have contributed to the goals of the Roman Catholic church.

Drum received honorary degrees from Boston College, St. Lawrence University, Fordham University, Loyola University of New Orleans, Columbia University, Rutgers University, New York University, Manhattan College, Pennsylvania Military College, and Georgetown University.

== Dates of rank ==
Drum's effective dates of rank were:

No insignia in 1898	Second lieutenant, Regular Army: September 9, 1898
	First lieutenant, Regular Army: January 15, 1900
	Captain, Regular Army: March 23, 1906
	Major, Regular Army: May 15, 1917
	Lieutenant colonel, National Army: August 5, 1917
	Colonel, National Army: July 30, 1918
	Brigadier general, National Army: October 1, 1918; Reverted to permanent rank of major on July 31, 1919.
	Major, Regular Army: July 31, 1919; Date of rank May 25, 1917.
	Lieutenant colonel, Regular Army: July 1, 1920
	Brigadier general, Regular Army: September 21, 1920
	Lieutenant colonel, Regular Army: March 4, 1921
	Colonel, Regular Army: May 9, 1921
	Brigadier general, Regular Army: December 6, 1922
	Major general, Temporary: January 29, 1930
	Major general, Regular Army: December 1, 1931
	Lieutenant general, Temporary: August 5, 1939
	Lieutenant general, Retired List: October 16, 1943
	Lieutenant general, New York Guard: October 19, 1943
	General, New York Guard (Retired): September 30, 1948

== Bibliography ==
- Davis, Henry Blaine Jr. (1998). Generals in Khaki. Raleigh, NC: Pentland Press. ISBN 1571970886. OCLC 40298151.
- Venzon, Anne Cipriano (2013). The United States in the First World War: an Encyclopedia. Hoboken, NJ: Taylor and Francis. ISBN 978-1-135-68453-2. OCLC 865332376.
- Zabecki, David T.; Mastriano, Douglas V., eds. (2020). Pershing's Lieutenants: American Military Leadership in World War I. New York, NY: Osprey Publishing. ISBN 978-1-4728-3863-6.

Military offices
Preceded by William Ottman	Commanding General of the New York Guard; 19 October 1943– 11 September 1948	Succeeded by Karl F. Hausauer
Preceded by None (position created)	Commanding General of the Eastern Defense Command; 18 March 1941– 8 October 1943	Succeeded by George Grunert
Preceded by James K. Parsons (Interim)	Commanding General of the First United States Army; 4 November 1938 – 8 October 1943	Succeeded by George Grunert
Preceded by George Van Horn Moseley	Deputy Chief of Staff of the United States Army; 23 February 1933 – 1 February 1935	Succeeded by George S. Simonds
Preceded by William C. Rivers	Inspector General of the U. S. Army; January 12, 1930 – November 30, 1931	Succeeded by John F. Preston
Preceded by Fox Conner	Commanding General of the 1st Infantry Division; September 1927 – January 1930	Succeeded by William P. Jackson
Preceded by Frank Parker	Commanding General of the 1st Infantry Division; May 1926 – May 1927	Succeeded by Fox Conner
Preceded by Lucius Roy Holbrook	Commandant of the Command and General Staff College; September 1920 – July 1921	Succeeded by Hanson Edward Ely
