= 67th Armor Regiment =

67th Armored Regiment
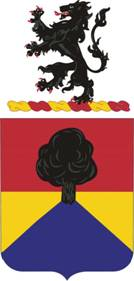
- Coat of arms
- Active: 1929
- Country: United States
- Branch: United States Army
- Type: Armor
- Size: 2 Battalions
- Nickname: Death Dealers (1st Battalion) Hounds of Hell (3rd Battalion)
- Mottos: Mortus et Destructo (Death & destruction), Ready for War (3rd Battalion)
- Anniversaries: 15 July 1940

Commanders
- Current commander: LTC Robert Humphrey (2023-Present) (1st Battalion); LTC Stephen N. Doyle (2025-Present) (3rd Battalion)
- Notable commanders: LTC Stuart M. James (2015-2017); LTC Damon Penn (1999-2001); LTC Robert Valdivia (2001-2003); LTC Joe Martin (2003-2005); LTC Patrick Donahoe (2005-2007); LTC Kenneth Casey (2007-2009); LTC Mike Simmering (2009-2011)

Insignia
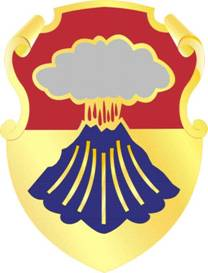
- Distinctive unit insignia

The 67th Armored Regiment is an armored regiment in the United States Army. The regiment was first formed in 1929 in the Regular Army as the 2nd Tank Regiment (Heavy) and redesignated as the 67th Infantry Regiment (Medium Tanks) in 1932. It first became the 67th Armor in 1940. The regiment participated in World War I, World War II, Desert Storm/Desert Shield, Operation Iraqi Freedom, Operation Enduring Freedom, Operation Spartan Shield, Operation Inherent Resolve, Operation Resolute Support, and Operation Freedom's Sentinel.

== Previous unit designated "67th Infantry Regiment" ==
The 67th Infantry Regiment was active during World War I from 1917 to 1919, but is not lineally related to the later 67th Infantry Regiment/Armored Regiment.

== Origins ==
The regiment was constituted in the Regular Army as the 2nd Tank Regiment (Heavy) on 1 September 1929, assigned to the General Headquarters Reserve and allotted to the Third Corps Area. The 1st Battalion was redesignated from the 19th Tank Battalion (Heavy), a Regular Army Inactive unit, and the 2nd Battalion from the 17th Tank Battalion (Heavy), an active unit stationed at Camp George G. Meade. The 3rd Battalion was constituted as a new unit, but not activated, and the regimental headquarters was not active. The regimental service company was redesignated from the inactive 22nd Tank Maintenance Company. In commemoration of the service of predecessor units of the 17th Tank Battalion in World War I, the regiment would receive a streamer for actions during the Somme Offensive. Except for Company F, the 2nd Battalion was inactivated on 15 September 1931. Only partially active, the regiment was redesignated as the 67th Infantry Regiment (Medium Tanks) on 25 October 1932. The regimental headquarters was organized on 4 April 1936 as a Regular Army Inactive unit with Organized Reserve personnel on 4 April 1936 at Columbus, Georgia.

== Coat of Arms ==
The 67th Armored Regiment Coat of Arms is described as follows by the United States Army Heraldry unit.

Description/Blazon
Per fess Gules and Or, a mount Azure erupting and smoking Proper. On a wreath of the colors Or and Gules, a lion rampant Sable. None.

Symbolism
The personnel of the 17th Tank Battalion, from which this organization descends, were in the old 305th Brigade and, therefore, adopted the undifferenced arms of that Brigade. The erupting mount symbolizes the anti-tank mines which caused heavy losses within the 17th Tank Battalion. The colors of the shield commemorate the insignia worn by the Brigade. The personnel of the 17th Tank Battalion, from which this organization descends, were in the old 305th Brigade and, therefore, adopted the undifferenced crest of that Brigade. The crest is taken from the ancient arms of Picardy, where the Brigade did all of its fighting.

Background
The coat of arms was originally approved for the 17th Tank Battalion on 12 July 1921. It was reassigned for the 2d Tank Regiment on 10 July 1930. It was reassigned for the 67th Infantry (Medium Tanks) on 17 November 1932. The insignia was redesignated for the 67th Armored Regiment on 6 April 1942. It was redesignated for the 67th Medium Tank Battalion on 8 January 1951. The insignia was redesignated for the 67th Armor Regiment on 4 November 1958.

== Distinctive Unit Insignia ==
The 67th Armored Regiment regimental unit insignia is described as follows by the United States Army Heraldry unit.

Description/Blazon
A Gold color metal and enamel device 1 1/8 inches (2.86 cm) in height consisting of a shield blazoned: Per fess Gules and Or, a mount Azure erupting and smoking Proper.

Symbolism
The personnel of the 17th Tank Battalion, from which this organization descends, were in the old 305th Brigade and, therefore, adopted the undifferenced arms and crest of that Brigade. The erupting mount symbolizes the anti-tank mines which caused heavy losses within the 17th Tank Battalion. The colors of the shield commemorate the insignia worn by the Brigade.

Background
The distinctive unit insignia was originally approved for the 17th Tank Battalion on 14 August 1923. It was reassigned for the 2d Tank Regiment on 11 July 1930. It was reassigned for the 67th Infantry (Medium Tanks) on 16 November 1932. The insignia was redesignated for the 67th Armored Regiment on 6 April 1942. It was redesignated for the 67th Medium Tank Battalion on 8 January 1951. The insignia was redesignated for the 67th Armor Regiment on 4 November 1958.

== World War II ==
After the outbreak of World War II, the armored forces were expanded. At Fort Benning, the 2nd Battalion and Company D were reactivated on 1 October 1939, followed by the remainder of the regiment, excluding the reserve personnel, on 5 June 1940. Colonel Douglass T. Greene was assigned as its commander. The assigned reserve officers conducted summer training with the active personnel at Fort Benning. The regiment was redesignated as the 67th Armored Regiment of the 2nd Armored Division on 15 July 1940. The regiment trained with the division in Georgia, Louisiana, and the Carolinas.

In 1942, the regiment and its division were sent overseas and saw their first action in Operation Torch, in which they landed at Casablanca. The regiment fought in the Allied invasion of Sicily with the division in 1943, then went to England. There, the regiment and the division trained for Operation Overlord, landing in Normandy on 9 June 1944. The regiment, less the 3rd Battalion, was awarded the Presidential Unit Citation for its performance during Operation Cobra, the breakthrough of German positions west of Saint-Lô. The regiment and division fought in the Allied advance from Paris to the Rhine, crossing the German border in September.

For its actions in the division's attack on the Siegfried Line in early October, the 2nd Battalion of the regiment received the Presidential Unit Citation. After the attack on the Siegfried Line stalled, the division held its positions along the Roer River and in December was ordered to the Ardennes after the German attack in the Battle of the Bulge. The regiment and division helped reduce the German bulge into Allied lines and received the Belgian Fourragère for their actions. After a brief rest in February, the 2nd Armored attacked across the Rhine in March 1945 and then the Elbe in the final weeks of the war. With the division, the regiment entered Berlin in July.

== Cold War ==
After the end of the war, the regiment returned to the United States with the division in 1946. There, it was broken up and redesignated as the 67th Tank Battalion, while some elements became part of the 6th Tank Battalion. The 67th Tank Battalion remained with the 2nd Armored Division until it was inactivated in 1957. When the Korean War began, the 6th Tank Battalion sent to Korea to join the 24th Infantry Division. The 6th remained in Korea with the 24th and was inactivated in 1958. The lineage of elements of the 67th Armored Regiment disbanded in 1946 was continued by the 321st Mechanized Cavalry Reconnaissance Squadron, a Boston-based Organized Reserve Corps unit that became 1st Battalion, 304th Armored Cavalry Regiment in 1948. The battalion was inactivated two years later and its designation returned to the Regular Army, becoming the 57th Tank Battalion. The latter was activated at Fort Hood as part of the 2nd Armored Division in 1950, and went to Germany with the division soon afterwards before being inactivated in West Germany in 1957.

When the army abolished regiments as a tactical unit due to their obsolescence in the Cold War, the lineages of former elements of the 67th Armored Regiment were consolidated to become the 67th Armor, a parent regiment under the Combat Arms Regimental System, on 1 July 1957. The 1st Battalion (1-67 Armor) of the regiment was assigned to the 2nd Armored Division. The 2nd Battalion (2-67 Armor) was assigned to the 4th Armored Division and in 1963 transferred to the 2nd Armored Division at Fort Hood. 2-67 Armor was inactivated in 1983.

The 3rd and 4th Battalions of the 67th Armor were designated and activated as Army Reserve units in 1959, with 3-67 Armor in Florida and 4-67 Armor in West Virginia. 4-67 Armor was headquartered at Wheeling with Company A at Weirton and Companies B and C at Steubenville. 3-67 Armor was inactivated in 1964 to become the 5th Battalion, 67th Armor (5-67 Armor). Both reserve battalions were inactivated in 1968 during reductions of the army reserve.

The 3-67 Armor lineage returned to the Regular Army when the battalion was activated on 1 March 1975 with the 2nd Armored Division at Fort Hood.

On 17 May 1986 the 67th Armor was withdrawn from CARS and reorganized under the new U.S. Army Regimental System with its home base at Fort Hood, the garrison of the senior battalion (1-67 Armor). In a series of army reflaggings on 16 June 1986, the 2nd and 4th Battalions of the regiment were reflagged from the 3rd and 1st Battalions of the 32nd Armor, respectively, stationed at Ray Barracks in Friedberg, West Germany with the 3rd Brigade, 3rd Armored Division.

== 1990s, Iraq, and Afghanistan ==
The post-Cold War reduction of the army resulted in rapid organizational change for the battalions of the regiment. 1-67 and 3-67 Armor became part of the 1st Cavalry Division on 21 May 1991, then returned to the reactivated 2nd Armored Division on 16 December 1992. Both units became part of the 4th Infantry Division on 16 January 1996 when it was reflagged from the 2nd Armored. 2-67 and 4-67 Armor fought in the Gulf War with the 3rd Armored Division, while 4-67 was part of the 3rd Brigade during Operation Desert Storm and joined 2-67 in the 1st Brigade later. After they returned to Germany, the 3rd Armored continued its inactivation, during which both battalions were transferred to the 1st Brigade, 1st Armored Division on 15 August 1991. 2-67 and 4-67 Armor were reflagged as the 1st and 2nd Battalions of the 37th Armor, respectively, on 16 February 1997.

The 67th Armor parent regiment was redesignated as the 67th Armored Regiment on 1 October 2005 when the army reintroduced the designation of regiment to regimental titles.

== 1st Battalion, 67th Armored ==
The 1st Battalion, 67th Armor Regiment was originally constituted on 24 March 1923 in the Regular Army as Company A, 19th Tank Battalion. It was redesignated on 1 September 1929 as Company A, 2d Tank Regiment. It converted and was redesignated 25 October 1932 as Company A, 67th Infantry (Medium Tanks). The unit activated on 5 June 1940 at Fort Benning, Georgia.

The unit converted and was redesignated on 15 July 1940 as Company A, 67th Armored Regiment, an element of the 2nd Armored Division. It was reorganized and redesignated on 25 March 1946 as Company D, 6th Tank Battalion, and remained an element of the 2d Armored Division. It was redesignated on 31 January 1949 as Company D, 6th Medium Tank Battalion (the 6th Medium Tank Battalion relieved 14 July 1950 from assignment to the 2d Armored Division and reassigned 29 October 1950 to the 24th Infantry Division). It disbanded on 10 November 1951 in Korea.

The company reconstituted on 3 December 1954 in the Regular Army as Company D, 6th Tank Battalion, an element of the 24th Infantry Division, and activated on 22 December 1954 in Japan. It was relieved on 1 July 1957 from assignment to the 24th Infantry Division, and concurrently reorganized and redesignated as Headquarters and Headquarters Company, 1st Medium Tank Battalion, 67th Armor, and assigned to the 2d Armored Division (with its organic elements concurrently constituted and activated).

The unit was reorganized and redesignated on 1 July 1963 as the 1st Battalion, 67th Armor. It was relieved on 21 May 1991 from assignment to the 2d Armored Division and assigned to the 1st Cavalry Division. It was relieved on 16 December 1992 from assignment to the 1st Cavalry Division and reassigned to the 2d Armored Division.

The 1st Battalion was relieved on 16 January 1996 from assignment to the 2d Armored Division and assigned to the 4th Infantry Division.

Since December 1995, the Division was thoroughly involved in the training, testing, and evaluation participating in the Division Capstone Exercise (DCX) I held at the National Training Center in the Fort Irwin Military Reservation, California in April 2001, and culminating in the DCX II held at Fort Hood, Texas, in October 2001.

In March 2003, the unit, along with the rest of 2nd Brigade, 4th Infantry Division, deployed to the Middle East for Operation Iraqi Freedom. The brigade moved up Highway 1 through Baghdad, Taji, and on to Saddam Hussein's hometown of Tikrit, destroying resistance from Iraqi forces. The 1–67th Armor Regiment, in conjunction with other components of 2nd Brigade, 4th Infantry Division, secured and held multiple airfields and military complexes for later use by follow-on forces as far north as K2 Airfield near Bayji with all but one company of 1–67 Armor occupying FOB Scunion, which is located a short distance from Camp Freedom 1 (formerly known as Camp Warhorse). 1–67 Armor redeployed to Fort Hood with the rest of the 4th Infantry Division in April 2004.

1–67 Armor served a second tour of duty in Iraq from November 2005 to November 2006. The 1st Battalion – 67th Armor Regiment of 2nd Brigade, 4th Infantry Division, was operating out of Forward Operating Base Iskandariyah, located at the Musayyib power plant near the city of Musayyib, Iraq. The unit's mission, along with that of the 2nd Brigade, was to train Iraqi Security Forces to conduct operations independent of coalition assistance. 1–67 Armor Regiment was charged with patrolling, alongside Iraqi police and Army forces, the cities of Karbala, Musayyib and Jurf as Sakhr. During this tour, the battalion conducted a wide range of missions in support of OIF 05-07. These missions included stability operations, counterinsurgency, foreign defense, and high intensity combat operations.

On 22 July 2006, the battalion fought the largest combat operation of the 4th Infantry Division's OIF 05-07 deployment. Members of the Mahdi Army ambushed D Company's 2nd Platoon, led by LT Ryan Kelley, in Musayyib. As the patrol fought its way out of the center of the city under heavy machine gun, rifle, and RPG fire, the battalion gathered combat power and moved from multiple locations to counter-attack into the city. Once the ambushed patrol made it out of the city, the battalion counter-attacked the Mahdi Army to seize the main mosque in Musayyib. Delta Company, led by CPT Irvin Oliver, 1–67 Armor led the battalion counterattack into the city on the east side of the Euphrates river while Alpha Company, led by CPT Bradley Maryoka, with a section from Delta Company, attacked in support from the west side of the Euphrates. Bravo Company, led by the Company Executive Officer, CPT Barry Wiley, followed Delta on the eastern side of the river and attacked into the center of the city along an axis west of Delta's advance. The Battalion TAC, with LTC Patrick Donahoe, the battalion commander, and CSM Earnest Barnett, the battalion command sergeant major, moved to the Tahir Iraqi Police Station west of the Route Cleveland bridge over the Euphrates where Iraqi Police Commanding General, General Qais joined the battalion commander. The 2nd Brigade/4th ID Commander, COL John Tully, also moved to the Tahir Iraqi Police Station. General Qais brought the highly trained Iraqi Police unit, "Hillah SWAT" with him and employed them with 1–67 AR specifically to clear the mosque at the center of Musayyib. Elements of the Iraqi 2nd Battalion, 4th Brigade, 8th Iraqi Division joined in the attack, successfully seizing the mosque and killing 33 militiamen. 1–67 Armor suffered no casualties, but 2/4/8 Iraqi Army had one soldier killed by enemy fire. The fight lasted over 8 hours. After the end of the fighting the battalion commander met with the city's leadership at the District Council building in Mussayib, including Themar Theban, the political leader of the Office of the Martyr Sadr. After their redeployment to Fort Hood, 1-67 AR and the entire 2nd Brigade, 4th Infantry Division was relocated to Fort Carson, Colorado as a part of a wider Army restructuring.

Five soldiers assigned to the battalion were killed on 10 April 2009 by a suicide vehicle-borne improvised explosive detonated near the Iraqi National Police headquarters in Mosul. Two Iraqi policemen also were killed, and the wounded included at least 62, including one American soldier and 27 civilians.

In 2011, 1-67 Armor deployed in support of Operation Enduring Freedom XI. The Death Dealer Battalion was deployed from May 2011 until April 2012. During that tour, the Death Dealers focused on improving security, governance and development in the Arghandab River Valley in RC-South, Afghanistan.

After 1-67 AR's redeployment from Afghanistan, the unit quickly reset and retrained and in October 2013, deployed to Kuwait in Support of Operation Spartan Shield. The majority of the battalion served in direct support of Operation Enduring Freedom.

2nd Brigade, 4th Infantry Division was deactivated on 15 January 2015. 1-67 AR was the only battalion to be reactivated from 2nd Brigade/4ID. 1-67 Armor officially stood up on 1 May 2015 at Fort Bliss, Texas under 3rd Brigade, 1st Armored Division.

On 1 June 2015, 1-67 Armor was reactivated under 3rd Armored Brigade Combat Team, 1st Armored Division, Fort Bliss, Texas. From October 2015 to April 2016, the Death Dealers went through a rigorous training program to prepare them for a National Training Center rotation (NTC 16-05) and subsequent deployment in support of Operation Spartan Shield.

In June 2016, 1-67 Armor deployed to Kuwait in support of Operation Spartan Shield. The Death Dealers sent elements forward to Iraq in support of Operation Inherent Resolve. This element was tasked with advising, assisting and enabling the 9th Iraqi Army Division to recapture territory in Northern Iraq that was previously lost to ISIL. Over the course of 9 months elements of 1-67 Armor contributed to the clearance of over 250 km^{2} of the Saladin Governorate and participated in the Mosul Offensive.

Simultaneously, while elements of the Death Dealer Battalion were involved in the Mosul Offensive, the unit's rifle company aptly named "Commando" deployed in support of Operation Freedom's Sentinel was called upon by the 101st Airborne Division's 3rd Brigade Combat Team "Rakkasans", to secure regions of Afghanistan that had not seen U.S. Forces in almost 4 years. The company spent an unprecedented 46 days working alongside Special Operations Forces from the United States, Poland, and Romania and the Texas Army National Guard as a part of Task Force "Rak Solid" in the Uruzgan Province, securing a small airstrip just outside of the remote village of Tarin Kot, 120 kilometers away from the nearest base, while tasked as part of an Expeditionary Advisor Package.

Most recently, 1-67 Armor deployed to EUCOM in support of Operation European Assure, Deter and Reinforce to counter Russian Aggression.

== 3rd Battalion, 67th Armor ==
The 3rd Battalion, 67th Armored Regiment officially reactivated at Fort Stewart, Georgia on 16 October 2017 as part of 2/3 ID's conversion from an Infantry Brigade Combat Team to an Armored Brigade Combat Team. The official ceremony uncasing 3-67 Armor occurred on 20 October 2016. 3-67 Armor last served as an active unit in 2008 when it was inactivated as part of an Army wide reorganization and reflagged to 2-12 CAV. 3-67 Armor deployed twice as part of the 4th Infantry Division in support of Operation Iraqi Freedom including OIF I and OIF 03 - 04 and 05-07 before inactivation.

After arriving at Fort Stewart, GA the 3rd Battalion deployed to Europe (2019-2020) and won the 2018 Sullivan Cup Best Tank Crew and 2022 Sullivan Cup Best Bradley Crew. 3-67 Armor deployed to Europe in September 2023 and was stationed in Lithuania as a Task Force with both A/6-8 CAV and A/9BEB attached until redeployment to Fort Stewart, GA in June 2024.

== Regimental lineage ==
Constituted 1 September 1929 in the Regular Army as the 2d Tank Regiment and organized (with only the 2d Battalion active) from new and existing units as follows:

- Regimental Headquarters and Headquarters Company, 3d Battalion, and Band constituted in the Regular Army
- 19th Tank Battalion (constituted 24 March 1923 in the Regular Army) redesignated as the 1st Battalion
- 17th Tank Battalion (organized in 1918 as Headquarters and Headquarters Company and Company B, 1st Separate Battalion, Heavy Tank Service, 65th Engineers; and Headquarters and Headquarters Company and Companies A and B, 303d Battalion, Tank Corps) reorganized and redesignated as the 2d Battalion
- 22d Tank Maintenance Company (organized 18 July 1918 as the 306th Repair and Salvage Company, Tank Corps) redesignated as the Service Company

(2d Battalion [less Company F] inactivated 15 September 1931 at Fort George G. Meade, Maryland)

2d Tank Regiment converted and redesignated 25 October 1932 as the 67th Infantry (Medium Tanks)

(Headquarters and Headquarters Company, 2d Battalion, and Company D, 67th Infantry [Medium Tanks], activated 1 October 1939 at Fort Benning, Georgia; Regimental Headquarters and Headquarters Company, Band, 1st Battalion, Company E, and 3d Battalion, 67th Infantry [Medium Tanks], activated 5 June 1940 at Fort Benning, Georgia)

Converted and redesignated 15 July 1940 as the 67th Armored Regiment and assigned to the 2d Armored Division

Regiment broken up 25 March 1946 and its elements reorganized and redesignated as elements of the 2d Armored Division as follows:

- Regimental Headquarters and Headquarters Company, 3d Battalion, and Company D as the 67th Tank Battalion
- Companies A and C as Companies D and C, 6th Tank Battalion, respectively (remainder of 6th Tank Battalion organized from elements of the 66th Armored Regiment)
- Headquarters and Headquarters Companies, 1st and 2d Battalions; Companies B, E, and F; the Maintenance and Service Companies and Band, disbanded

After 25 March 1946 the above units underwent changes as follows:

67th Tank Battalion

- 67th Tank Battalion redesignated 11 October 1948 as the 67th Medium Tank Battalion
- Redesignated 1 April 1953 as the 67th Tank Battalion
- Inactivated 1 July 1957 in Germany and relieved from assignment to the 2d Armored Division

Company C, 6th Tank Battalion

- Company C, 6th Tank Battalion, redesignated 31 January 1949 as Company C, 6th Medium Tank Battalion
- (6th Medium Tank Battalion relieved 14 July 1950 from assignment to the 2d Armored Division; assigned 29 October 1950 to the 24th Infantry Division)
- Redesignated 10 November 1951 as Company C, 6th Tank Battalion
- Inactivated 5 June 1958 in Korea and relieved from assignment to the 24th Infantry Division

HHC and support units

- Headquarters and Headquarters Companies, 1st and 2d Battalions; Companies B, E, and F; and Maintenance and Service Companies, 67th Armored Regiment, reconstituted 6 February 1947 in the Organized Reserves as the 321st Mechanized Cavalry Reconnaissance Squadron
- Activated 21 February 1947 at Boston, Massachusetts
- Reorganized and redesignated 21 October 1948 as the 1st Battalion, 304th Armored Cavalry
- Inactivated 31 July 1950 at Boston, Massachusetts
- Withdrawn 17 August 1950 from the Organized Reserve Corps, redesignated (less the Assault Gun and Tank Companies) as the 57th Medium Tank Battalion, and allotted to the Regular Army
- Assigned 20 October 1950 to the 2d Armored Division
- Activated 10 November 1950 at Fort Hood, Texas

Reorganized and redesignated 1 April 1953 as the 57th Tank Battalion Inactivated 1 July 1957 in Germany and relieved from assignment to the 2d Armored Division

57th and 67th Tank Battalions, and Company D, 6th Tank Battalion, consolidated, reorganized, and redesignated 1 July 1957 as the 67th Armor, a parent regiment under the Combat Arms Regimental System.

== Campaign participation credit ==
World War I: Somme Offensive

World War II': Algeria-French Morocco (with arrowhead); Sicily (with arrowhead); Normandy; Northern France; Rhineland; Ardennes-Alsace; Central Europe

Southwest Asia: Defense of Saudi Arabia; Liberation and Defense of Kuwait; Cease-Fire

Operation Iraqi Freedom

== Decorations ==
- Presidential Unit Citation (Army), Streamer embroidered NORMANDY
- Presidential Unit Citation (Army), Streamer embroidered SIEGFRIED LINE
- Valorous Unit Award, Streamer embroidered IRAQ-KUWAIT
- Navy Unit Commendation, Streamer embroidered SAUDI ARABIA-KUWAIT
- Belgian Fourragere 1940
  - Cited in the Order of the Day of the Belgian Army for action in BELGIUM
  - Cited in the Order of the Day of the Belgian Army for action in the ARDENNES
