= Joseph M. Martin =

US Army general (born 1962)

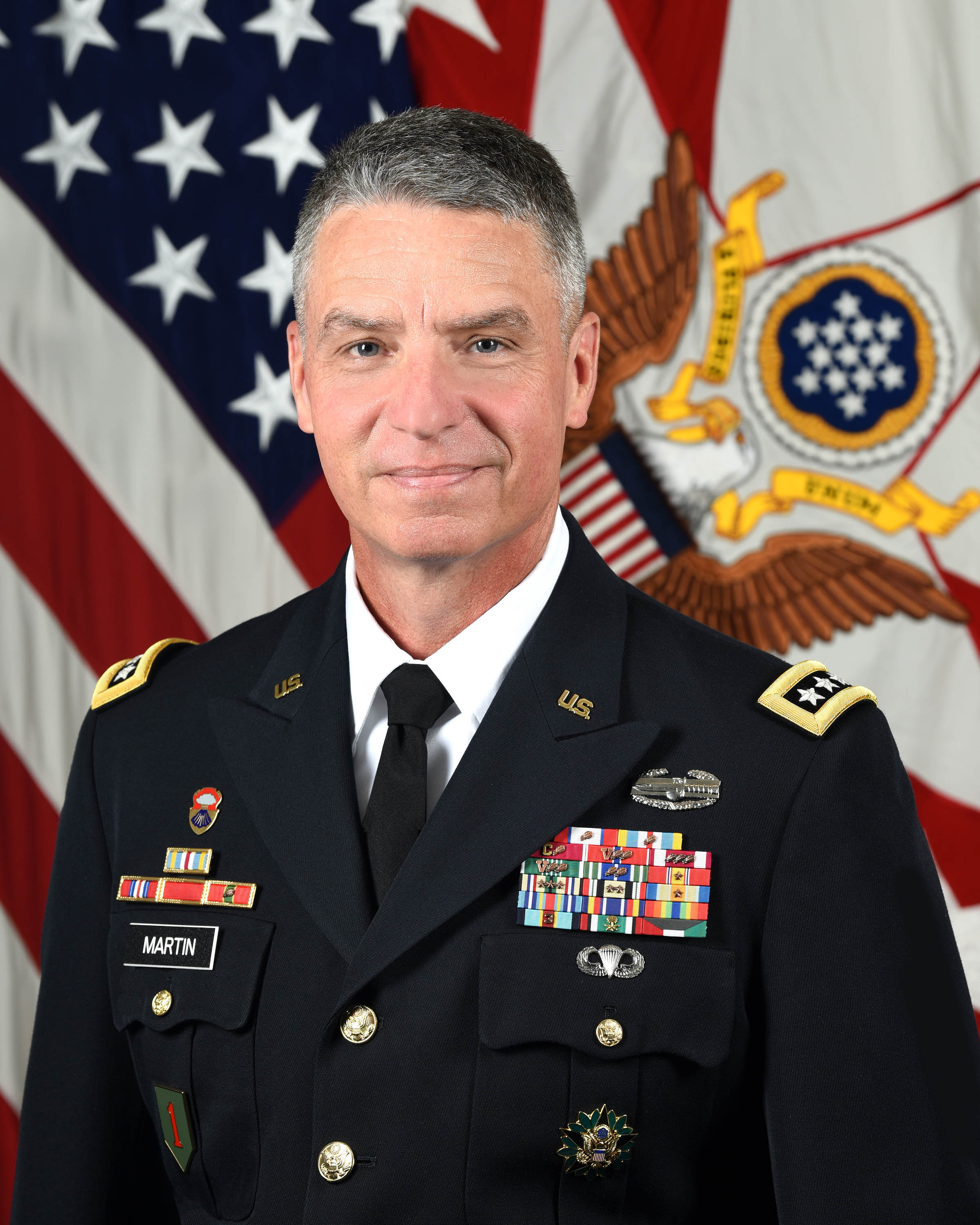
- Official portrait, 2019
- Born: 29 December 1962 (age 63); Dearborn, Michigan, United States
- Military career
- Allegiance: United States
- Branch: United States Army
- Service years: 1986–2022
- Rank: General
- Commands: Vice Chief of Staff of the Army; 1st Infantry Division; Fort Irwin National Training Center; United States Army Operational Test Command; 2nd Brigade Combat Team, 1st Infantry Division; 1st Battalion, 67th Armor Regiment
- Conflicts: Gulf War; Iraq War; War against ISIL
- Awards: Army Distinguished Service Medal (3); Defense Superior Service Medal (2); Legion of Merit (3); Bronze Star Medal (3)
- Joseph M. Martin's voice Martin's opening statement at a House Armed Services subcommittee hearing on military readiness Recorded July 19, 2022

Joseph Matthew Martin (born 29 December 1962) is a retired United States Army general in the United States Army who served as the 37th Vice Chief of Staff of the Army from 2019 to 2022. He previously served as the director of the Army Staff in Washington, D.C.

== Education ==
A native of Dearborn, Michigan and the son of a Ford Motor Company executive, Martin graduated from Dearborn High School in 1981. He graduated from the United States Military Academy at West Point in 1986.

Martin earned a master's degree from the University of Louisville, and graduated from the U.S. Army Command and General Staff College and the U.S. Army War College.

== Military career ==
After graduating the United States Military Academy, Martin served as a tank platoon leader, scout platoon leader, and company executive officer in the 1st Battalion, 37th Armor Regiment, in the 1st Armored Division (1987 to 1990). Upon graduation from the Armor Officer Advanced Course, he was assigned to 4th Battalion, 37th Armor Regiment in the 1st Infantry Division where he commanded Company B during Operation Desert Storm and at Fort Riley, Kansas. Martin commanded the 2nd Brigade, 1st Infantry Division from Fort Riley, Kansas, and deployed with that command to serve in northwest Baghdad, Iraq. Following brigade command, he became the chief of staff of III Corps in Fort Hood, Texas. From June 2012 to April 2013, Martin commanded the U.S. Army Operational Test Command.

Martin was assigned at the National Training Center and Fort Irwin in California as the Commanding General. He participated in Operation Iraqi Freedom as the commander of 1st Battalion of the 67th Armor Regiment in the 4th Infantry Division. He was also the commander of the Combined Joint Forces Land Component Command Operation Inherent Resolve in Mosul in the fight against the Islamic State.

Martin was the commanding general of the 1st Infantry Division from September 2016 to May 2018.

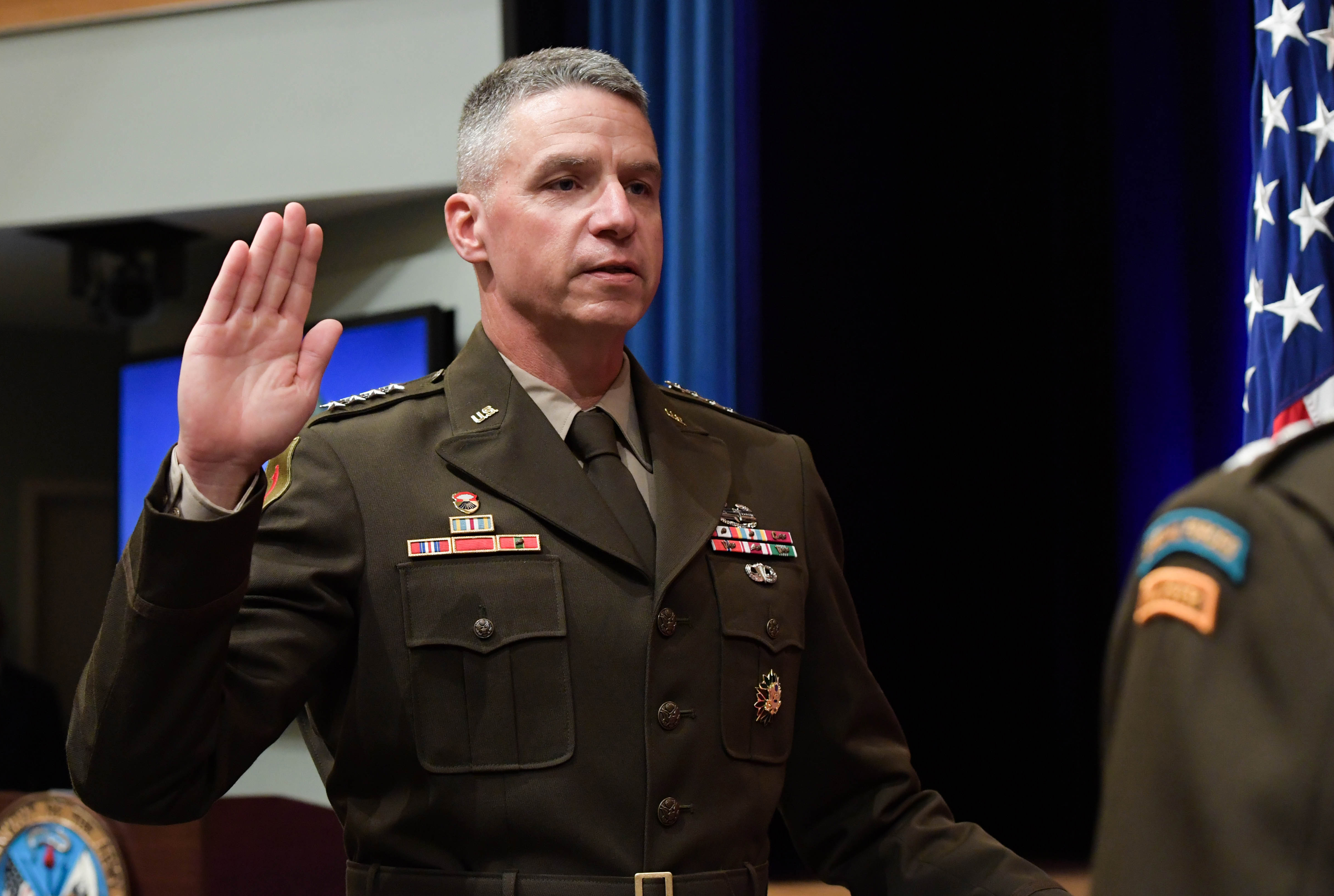
Gen. Joseph M. Martin recites the oath of office before being sworn in as Vice Chief of Staff of the Army by Army chief of staff Gen. Mark A. Milley at the Pentagon, Arlington Va., July 26, 2019.

In May 2018, Martin was nominated for promotion to lieutenant general and an assignment as the Director of the Army Staff. On 26 July 2019, he was assigned as the Army's 37th Vice Chief of Staff and promoted to general.

== Awards and decorations ==
Joseph M. Martin is the recipient of the following awards:

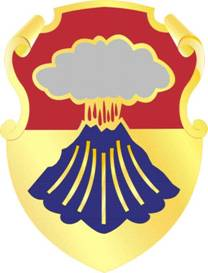
Combat Action Badge
Basic Parachutist Badge
Army Staff Identification Badge
1st Infantry Division Combat Service Identification Badge
67th Armored Regiment Distinctive Unit Insignia
6 Overseas Service Bars

Army Distinguished Service Medal with two bronze oak leaf clusters
Defense Superior Service Medal with oak leaf cluster
Legion of Merit with "C" device and two oak leaf clusters
Bronze Star Medal with "V" device and two oak leaf clusters
Meritorious Service Medal with one silver and one bronze oak leaf clusters
Army Commendation Medal with Valor device and two oak leaf clusters
Army Achievement Medal with two oak leaf clusters
Joint Meritorious Unit Award
Valorous Unit Award
Meritorious Unit Commendation
Superior Unit Award with oak leaf cluster
National Defense Service Medal with one bronze service star
Southwest Asia Service Medal with three service stars
Iraq Campaign Medal with two service stars
Inherent Resolve Campaign Medal with service star
Global War on Terrorism Expeditionary Medal
Global War on Terrorism Service Medal
Army Service Ribbon
Army Overseas Service Ribbon with bronze award numeral 3
Kuwait Liberation Medal (Saudi Arabia)
Kuwait Liberation Medal (Kuwait)

Military offices
Preceded by Theodore D. Martin	Commanding General, Fort Irwin National Training Center; 2015–2016	Succeeded by Jeffery D. Broadwater
Preceded by Wayne W. Grigsby Jr.	Commanding General, 1st Infantry Division; 2016–2018	Succeeded by John S. Kolasheski
Preceded by Gary H. Cheek	Director of the Army Staff; 2018–2019	Succeeded by Walter E. Piatt
Preceded by James C. McConville	Vice Chief of Staff of the Army; 2019–2022	Succeeded by Randy George
