= Fox Conner =

United States Army general (1874–1951)

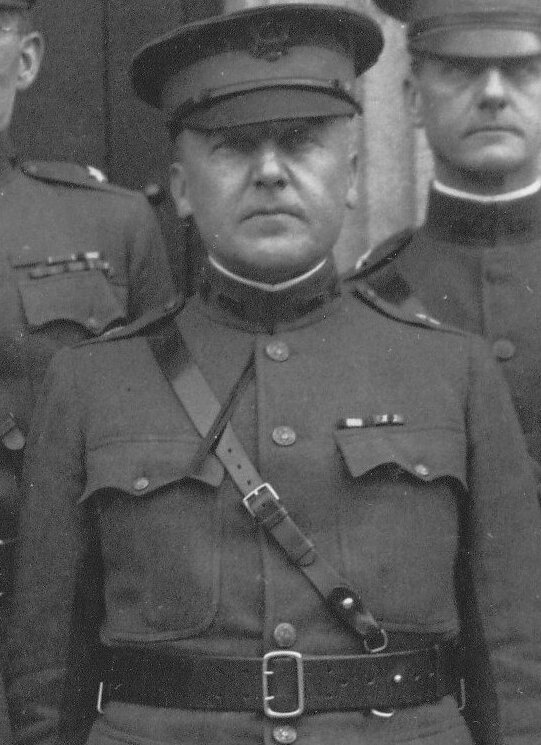
- Born: November 2, 1874; Slate Springs, Mississippi, United States
- Died: October 13, 1951 (aged 76); Washington, D.C., United States
- Relatives: Andrew F. Fox (uncle)
- Military career
- Allegiance: United States
- Branch: United States Army
- Service years: 1898–1938
- Rank: Major general
- Service number: 0-85
- Unit: Field Artillery Branch
- Commands: First Army; First Corps Area; Hawaiian Department; 1st Division; 20th Infantry Brigade
- Conflicts: Spanish–American War; Pancho Villa Expedition; World War I
- Awards: Army Distinguished Service Medal; Purple Heart; Companion of the Order of the Bath (United Kingdom); Commander of the Legion of Honour (France); Croix de Guerre (France); Commander of the Order of the Crown (Belgium)

Fox Conner (November 2, 1874 – October 13, 1951) was a major general of the United States Army. He served as operations officer for the American Expeditionary Forces (AEF) during World War I, and is best remembered as a mentor to the generation of officers who led the army in World War II, particularly as "the man who made Eisenhower."

== Early life ==
Conner was born on November 12, 1874, at Slate Springs, in Calhoun County, Mississippi. His father, Robert Herbert Conner, was a soldier in the Confederate States Army who was wounded several times during the American Civil War. In his final engagement, the Battle of Atlanta, Robert Conner was shot in the head and lost his sight. After the war he was nicknamed "Blind Bob". He learned to gauge the grades of cotton by touch, and became a successful cotton trader. In addition, he began teaching at the Slate Springs Academy. The school had been founded by Conner's uncle Fuller Fox in 1872, and several members of the Fox family were on the faculty. Robert Conner met Nancy (Nannie) Hughes Fox when both were teaching at the academy, and they married on 30 December 1873.

Conner was educated in Slate Springs, and was an avid reader of The Youth's Companion magazine. After turning eighteen, and "captivated by military history at a young age", he wanted to embark on a career in the armed forces, so his uncle recommended him to Representative Hernando Money for appointment to the United States Military Academy (USMA) at West Point, New York. Money nominated Conner on 31 May 1893. He entered the following year.

== Early career ==
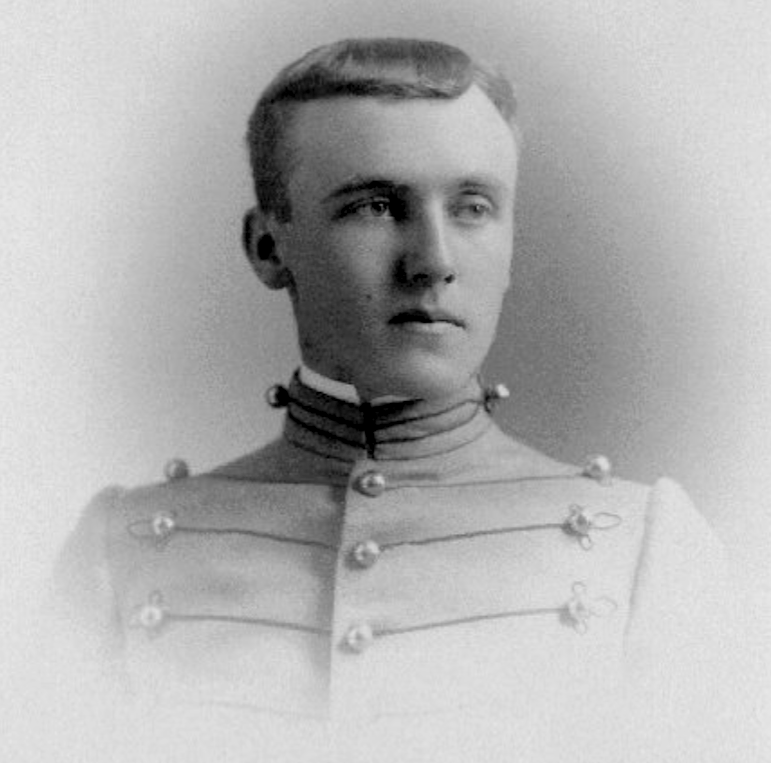
Fox Conner at West Point in 1898

"During his final year at West Point, Conner's company tactical officer was First Lieutenant Pershing", a man who would play a significant part in Conner's future military career. Despite possessing a "towering intellect", his "overall academic record at West Point was only slightly better than average", which resulted in him graduating in 1898 ranked 17th of 59 students. At graduation, Conner received his commission as a second lieutenant of Field Artillery. He was assigned to the 1st Artillery Regiment, and the army denied his numerous requests for transfer to the Cavalry.

Conner's first posting was to Fort Adams in Newport, Rhode Island. After brief assignments in Huntsville, Alabama, and Savannah, Georgia, he was sent to Cuba in January 1899 to serve with the United States occupation force following the Spanish–American War.

In August 1900, Conner was reassigned to Washington Barracks (today named Fort McNair) in Washington, D.C. He was promoted to captain in 1901 and was transferred to Fort Hamilton, New York in November 1901 as commander of the 123rd Coast Artillery Company. He held this assignment until August 1905 when he began attendance at the Army Staff College at Fort Leavenworth, Kansas. He then served as adjutant of the Artillery sub-post at Fort Riley, Kansas from July 1906 to May 1907. Here, "he was assigned the task of revising the curriculum for the artillery officer course to incorporate the lessons of the Spanish–American and Russo–Japanese wars".

In September 1907, Conner was assigned to the Army's General Staff and also as a student at the Army War College from which he graduated in July 1911. He was then attached to the French 22nd Field Artillery Regiment in Versailles, France from October 1911 to October 1912.

Following his return to the United States, Conner commanded Artillery batteries in the Western states and on the Mexican border. In July 1916, Conner was promoted to major and assigned to the Inspector General's office in Washington. He was in this position when the United States declared war on Germany in April 1917.

== World War I ==
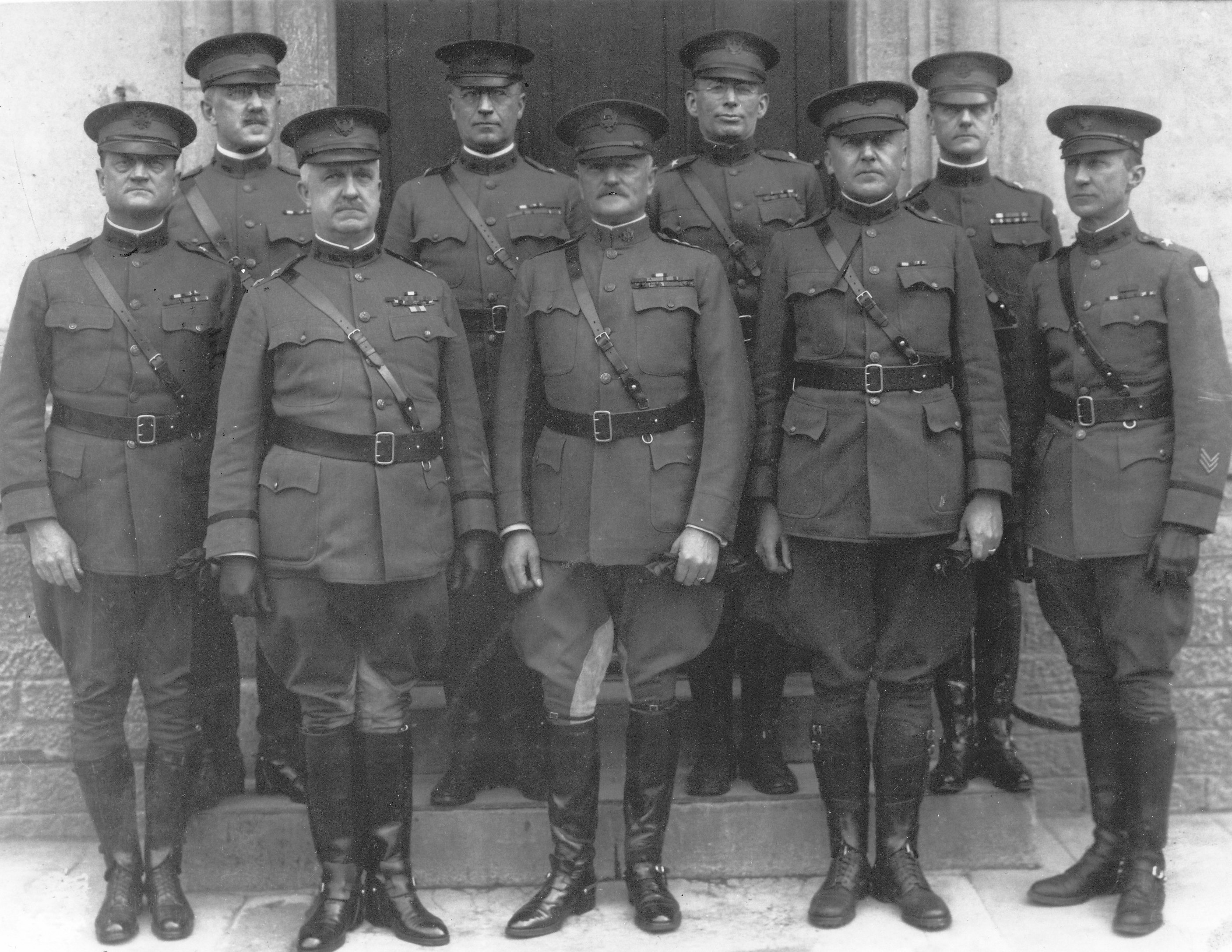
General Pershing and members of his staff at Headquarters, Chaumont, France. Standing to Pershing's left in the center is Brigadier General Fox Conner.

In June, Conner was selected by Major General John J. Pershing to be a member of the operations section (G3) for the American Expeditionary Forces (AEF) staff in France. He was promoted to lieutenant colonel on May 15, 1917, and to temporary colonel on August 5. In November Conner was selected as Pershing's Assistant Chief of Staff for Operations (G3); his subordinates included John McAuley Palmer and George C. Marshall. Conner developed an immense respect for both men, and later referred to Marshall as the ideal soldier and a military genius.

Conner was promoted to temporary brigadier general on August 8, 1918. After the Armistice was signed in November, Conner was assigned to the Army General Staff in Washington and was promoted to permanent colonel on August 22, 1919.

Conner gained Pershing's respect and admiration during the war, causing Pershing to write to Conner that:

Your broad conception of our task and your able counsel in all our organization, as well as your clear vision of the strategy of our operations, stand out vividly in my memory. None the less vividly do I recall your constant solicitude and aid in the trying days of battle and your unyielding support in times of difficulty with our Allies. Can I say more? Yes! One thing more. I could have spared any man in the AEF better than you.

In 1920, a subcommittee of the House of Representatives launched an investigation in the losses among United States Army personnel that had occurred in the hours between the time when the Armistice of 11 November 1918 had been signed and the time when it came into effect. During the hearings, Conner drew heavy criticism from Congressman Oscar E. Bland and was named by Brigadier General John H. Sherburne, of the Massachusetts National Guard and the former commander of the artillery of the African American 92nd Division, as the individual most responsible for not stopping a scheduled attack by the 92nd Division of Lieutenant General Robert Lee Bullard's Second Army. The panel members rejected Sherburne's assertion and the final report of the subcommittee held no one person accountable for the losses.

For his service as the "brain" of the AEF, Conner was awarded the Army Distinguished Service Medal and the French Croix de Guerre. After the war, Conner and Palmer received credit for writing the after-action report on World War I operations which influenced the content of the National Defense Act of 1920 and set the course for the interwar army.

=== Army Distinguished Service Medal citation ===
The President of the United States of America, authorized by Act of Congress, July 9, 1918, takes pleasure in presenting the Army Distinguished Service Medal to Brigadier General Fox Conner, United States Army, for exceptionally meritorious and distinguished services to the Government of the United States, in a duty of great responsibility during World War I. As Assistant Chief of Staff in charge of the Operations Section, General Conner has shown a masterful conception of all the tactical situations which have confronted the American forces in Europe. By his high professional attainments and sound military judgment he has handled with marked skill the many details of the complex problems of organization and troop movements that were necessitated by the various operations of the American Expeditionary Forces. Service: Army Rank: Brigadier General Division: American Expeditionary Forces GENERAL ORDERS: War Department, General Orders No. 12 (1919)

== Conner and Eisenhower ==
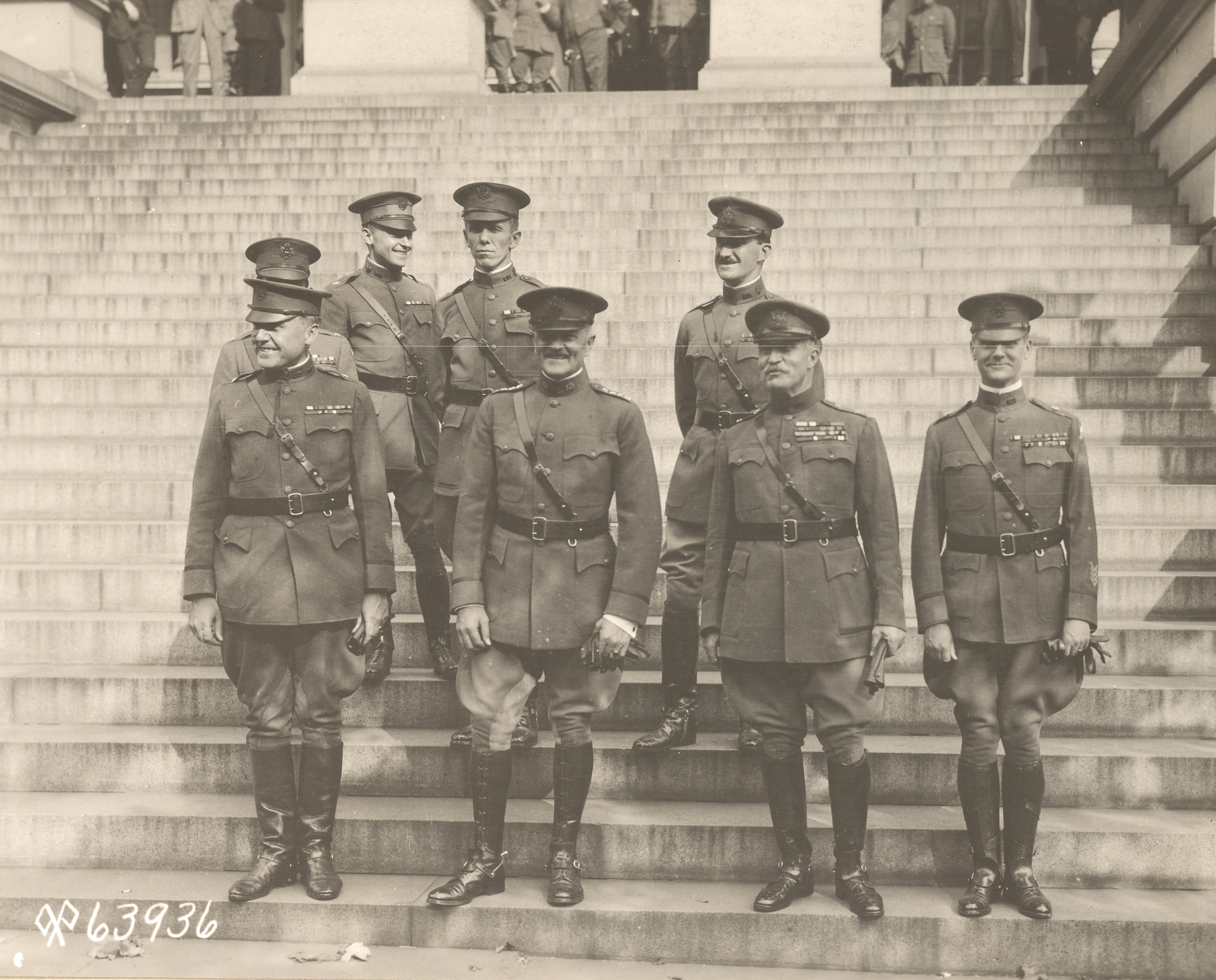
General of the Armies John J. Pershing and members of his staff standing outside the State, War, and Navy Building in Washington, D. C., September 23, 1919. Standing to Pershing's right is Colonel Fox Conner.

Conner's most remembered contribution to the army was his mentorship of promising subordinates, most notably Major Dwight D. Eisenhower. Conner first met Eisenhower "in Autumn of 1920, introduced by Lieutenant Colonel George S. Patton at a Sunday dinner at the Pattons." Eisenhower would later note that perhaps the greatest reward of his friendship with Patton was being introduced to Conner. Conner and Eisenhower immediately developed a great mutual respect: "Conner became Eisenhower's teacher and a father figure whom he admired above all others." Following his promotion to permanent brigadier general in 1921, Conner took command of the 20th Infantry Brigade in Panama. He invited Eisenhower to join his staff and for three years Conner conducted a systematic course of study for Eisenhower that ranged from extensive readings in military history to daily practical experience writing field orders for every aspect of the command. "As Eisenhower later told it, the next two years under Conner were the most intense period of military education he ever experienced. Conner recognized that Eisenhower had a great but underdeveloped talent, which Conner set out to fix".

Conner had three principles or rules of war for a democracy that he imparted to both Eisenhower and Marshall. They were:

- Never fight unless you have to;
- Never fight alone; and
- Never fight for long.

Of particular importance to Eisenhower's later career, Conner emphasized the importance of coalition command in preparation for the inevitable war. Said Eisenhower,

One of the subjects on which [Conner] talked to me most was allied command, its difficulties and its problems. Another was George C. Marshall. Again and again General Conner said to me, 'We cannot escape another great war. When we go into that war it will be in company with allies. ... We must insist on individual and single responsibility—leaders will have to learn how to overcome nationalistic considerations in the conduct of campaigns. One man who can do it is Marshall—he is close to being a genius.'

Conner pulled strings to get his protégé admitted to the U.S. Army Command and Staff School at Fort Leavenworth, Kansas, where Eisenhower graduated first in his class thanks in no small part to his comprehensive Panamanian tutelage, in addition to the class notes Eisenhower received from Patton, who had attended the school earlier.

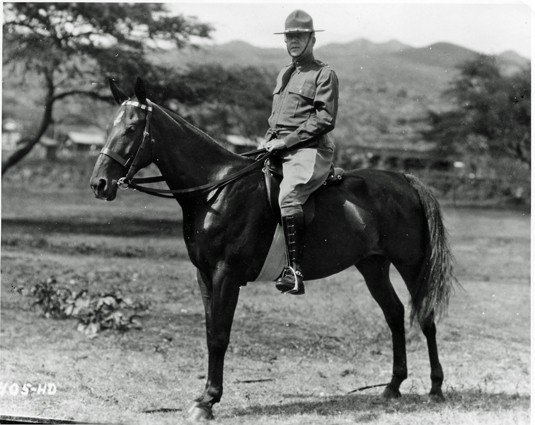
Brigadier General Fox Conner at the Panama Canal Zone as commander of the 20th Infantry Brigade, circa 1922.

Eisenhower later commented on Conner's abilities: "Outside of my parents he had more influence on me and my outlook than any other individual, especially in regard to the military profession."

== Later service ==
Conner left Panama in late 1924 to assume his duties in Washington as the Army's Assistant Chief of Staff for Logistics (G-4), which started on December 1, 1924.

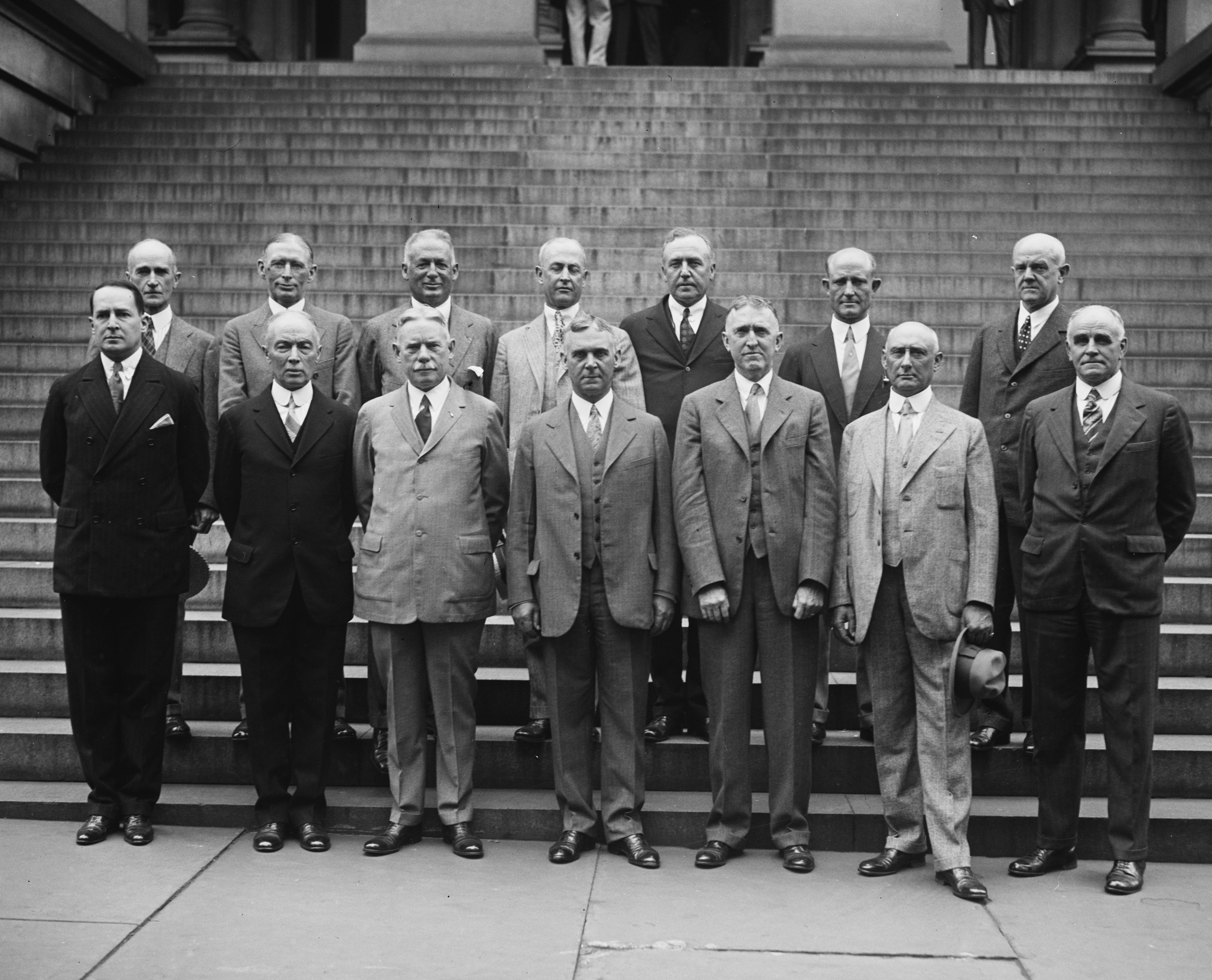
Corps area commanders and division commanders meet with the army chief of staff, Major General Charles Pelot Summerall, at the War Department, May 1927. Stood in the back row, third from the right, is Major General Fox Conner, commanding the 1st Division.

Conner was promoted to major general on October 20, 1925, and assigned as Deputy Chief of Staff of the Army on March 9, 1926. He commanded the 1st Division at Fort Hamilton from May 1 to September 1, 1927, and the Hawaiian Department in Honolulu from January 25, 1928, to August 5, 1930. He was assigned as commander of the First Corps Area in Boston on October 7, 1930.

Conner was Pershing's preference for Army Chief of Staff in 1930, but was passed over in favor of Major General Douglas MacArthur. "According to some sources, Conner took himself out of the running. He hated Washington, and he did not want to go back there. Nonetheless, one can only speculate how differently the course of U.S. Army history might have run if Conner rather than MacArthur had replaced Summerall".

On March 12, 1936, The [Calhoun County] Monitor-Herald published a "Biographical Sketch of General Fox Conner" written by Louise Ligon, which includes this assignment:

"When President Roosevelt, in April 1933, instituted his Civilian Conservation Corps, he assigned to General Conner the tremendous task of mobilizing approximately 24,000 young men and World War veterans for the 125 companies in the six New England states. This was the largest contingent ever mobilized during peace times, but the momentous task of building the 125 camps with 500 barracks from Connecticut to Maine, and across the Berkshire Hills to Lake Champlain, was carried out promptly as scheduled."

Conner was assigned to command the First Army in 1936 and retired on November 4, 1938, after forty years of service.

Conner's lasting legacy was as a role model and inspiration to World War II high commanders including Marshall, Eisenhower, and Patton. Eisenhower considered Conner to be the greatest soldier he ever knew, saying: "In sheer ability and character, he was the outstanding soldier of my time."

Conner died at Walter Reed Army Medical Center on October 13, 1951. His ashes were scattered at Brandreth Park in the Adirondack Mountains of New York. In addition, there is a cenotaph to his memory at Dale Cemetery in Ossining, New York.

== Family ==
In 1902, Conner married Virginia Brandreth, the daughter of Franklin Brandreth, a successful patent medicine maker from New York, and granddaughter of Benjamin Brandreth. They had three children:

- Daughter Betty Virginia Vida (1903–2000), the wife of Colonel Frank Joseph Vida (1894–1970)
- Son Fox Brandreth (1905–2000), a 1927 graduate of West Point who served as an army lieutenant before pursuing a business career as president of the Brandreth family business, the Allcock Manufacturing Company, a maker of humane animal traps
- Daughter Florence Slocum Gans (1910–1964), the wife of Colonel Edgar A. Gans (1902–1965).

== Military awards ==
American awards

- Army Distinguished Service Medal
- Purple Heart
- Spanish War Service Medal
- Army of Cuban Occupation Medal
- Victory Medal

Foreign awards

- Companion of the Order of the Bath (United Kingdom)
- Commander of the Legion of Honour (France)
- Commander of the Order of the Crown (Belgium)
- Commander of the Order of the Crown of Italy
- Croix de Guerre (France)

== Dates of rank ==
No insignia	Cadet, United States Military Academy: June 15, 1894
No pin insignia in 1898	Second lieutenant, Regular Army: April 26, 1898
	First lieutenant, Regular Army: January 25, 1901
	Captain, Regular Army: September 23, 1901
	Major, Regular Army: July 1, 1916
	Lieutenant colonel, Regular Army: May 15, 1917
	Colonel, Temporary: August 5, 1917
	Brigadier General, National Army: August 8, 1918
	Colonel, Regular Army: August 22, 1919
	Brigadier General, Regular Army: July 3, 1920
	Colonel, Regular Army: March 4, 1921
	Brigadier General, Regular Army: April 27, 1921
	Major General, Regular Army: October 20, 1925
	Major General, Retired List: September 30, 1938

== Bibliography ==
- Cox, Edward L. (2011). Grey eminence: Fox Conner and the art of mentorship. Stillwater, Okla.: New Forums. ISBN 978-1-58107-203-7.
- Davis, Henry Blaine Jr. (1998). Generals in Khaki. Pentland Press, Inc. ISBN 1-57197-088-6. OCLC 40298151.
- Rabalais, Steven (2016). General Fox Conner: Pershing's Chief of Operations and Eisenhower's Mentor. Havertown, PA: Casemate Publishers. ISBN 978-1-61200-397-9.
- Zabecki, David T.; Mastriano, Douglas V., eds. (2020). Pershing's Lieutenants: American Military Leadership in World War I. New York, NY: Osprey Publishing. ISBN 978-1-4728-3863-6.
- Puryear, Edgar F. (1981). Nineteen stars: a study in military character and leadership (2nd ed.). Novato, CA: Presidio Press. ISBN 0-89141-148-8.
- The Next Middle East War, by Robert Gates, U.S. Secretary of Defense

Military offices
Preceded by Dennis E. Nolan	Commanding General First Army; 1936–1938	Succeeded by Hugh Aloysius Drum
