= Randolph W. House =

US Army lieutenant general (born 1945)

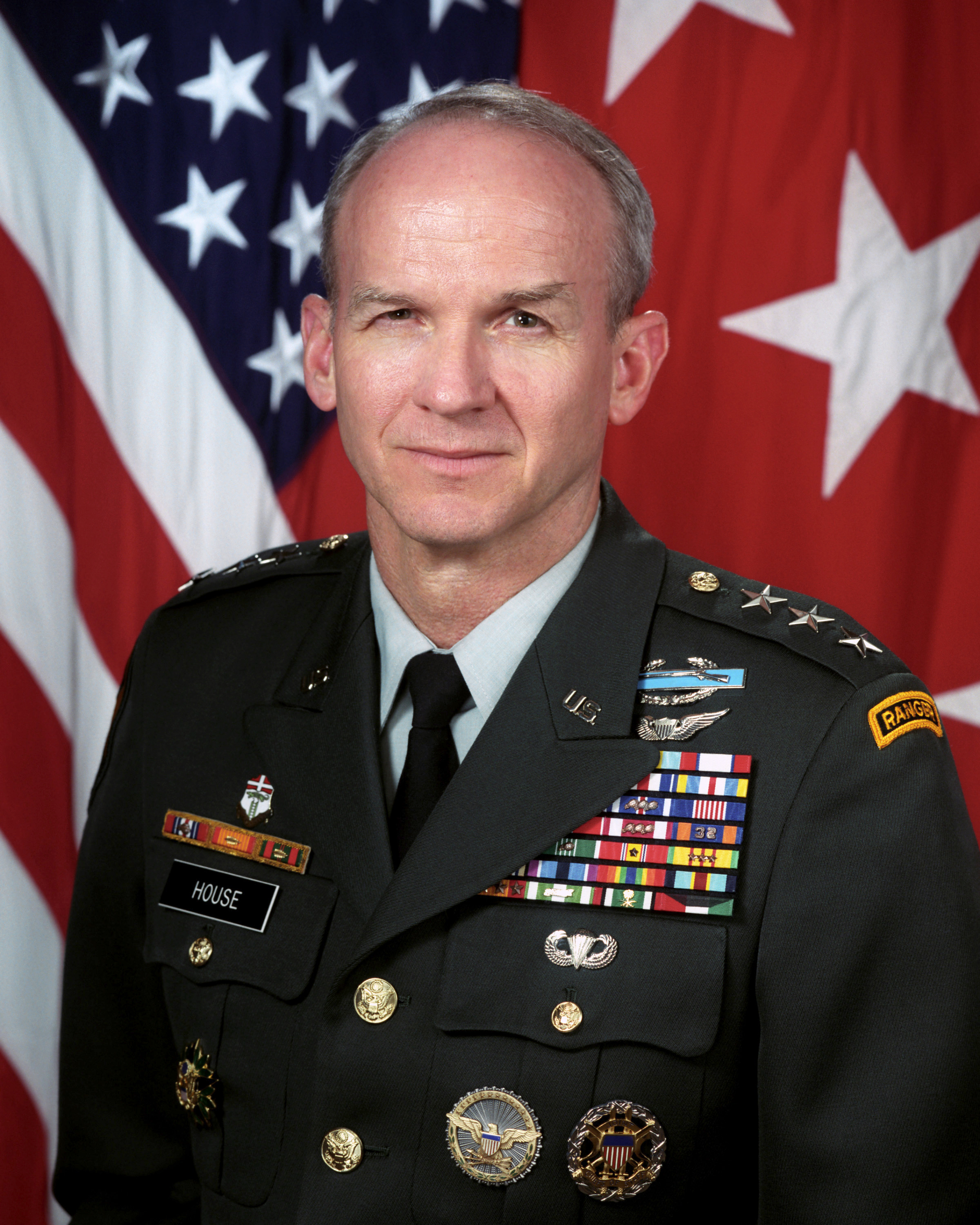
- House in 1997
- Born: 24 July 1945 (age 81); Corpus Christi, Texas, US
- Alma mater: Texas A&M University; Clemson University; United States Army Command and General Staff College; National War College
- Spouse: Ellen Jean Wright (m. 1968)
- Children: 2
- Military career
- Service: United States Army
- Service years: 1968–2001
- Rank: Lieutenant General
- Nickname: Randy
- Units: US Army Infantry Branch; US Army Armor Branch; US Army Aviation Branch
- Commands: Company C, 2nd Battalion, 506th Infantry Regiment; Company C, 2nd Battalion, 158th Aviation Regiment; 1st Battalion, 61st Infantry Regiment; 2nd Brigade, 1st Cavalry Division; 1st Infantry Division; Eighth Army
- Wars: Vietnam War; Gulf War
- Awards: Defense Distinguished Service Medal (3); Army Distinguished Service Medal; Silver Star; Defense Superior Service Medal; Distinguished Flying Cross (4); Bronze Star Medal (2); Soldier's Medal; Air Medal (32); Complete List
- Other work: Rancher; Senior military mentor

Randolph W. House (born 24 July 1945) is a retired lieutenant general of the United States Army. A veteran of the Vietnam War and the Gulf War, he served from 1968 to 2001, and his command assignments included the 1st Infantry Division (1994 to 1996) and Eighty Army (1997 to 1998).

A native of Corpus Christi, Texas, House was raised in Houston and is a 1963 graduate of Lamar High School. He participated in the Army Reserve Officers' Training Corps while attending Texas A&M University, from which he graduated in 1968. Commissioned as a second lieutenant in the Infantry Branch, he served in the Vietnam War as a platoon leader. He was subsequently qualified in Aviation and Armor, and commanded an attack helicopter platoon and an Infantry company in Vietnam. Later assignments included assistant professor of military science at Clemson University, where House completed a master's degree.

In the late 1970s, House was among the officers who tested the Fort Irwin National Training Center before it went into operation. He later commanded 1st Battalion, 61st Infantry Regiment, which was followed by a posting as director of plans, operations, training, and mobilization (G-3) for the 5th Infantry Division. In July 1990, House was appointed to command 2nd Brigade, 1st Cavalry Division, which he led in Southwest Asia during Operation Desert Shield and Operation Desert Storm. After service as deputy commandant of the United States Army Command and General Staff College beginning in 1993, in 1994 he was assigned as commander of the 1st Infantry Division. From 1997 to 1998, he commanded Eighth Army with the rank of lieutenant general. In September 1998, he was assigned as deputy commander of United States Pacific Command, where he remained until he retired in 2001.

== Early life ==
Randolph Watkins House was born in Corpus Christi, Texas on 24 July 1945, the son of Glenn C. House and Vera (Watkins) House. He was raised and educated in Houston, and graduated from Lamar High School in 1963. He then began attendance at Texas A&M University, from which he graduated in 1968 with a Bachelor of Science degree in Agricultural Economics. (Note: House attended Texas A&M as a member of the class of 1967 but received his degree in January 1968.) While in college, House participated in the Army Reserve Officers' Training Corps (ROTC) program, and at graduation he received his army commission as a second lieutenant of Infantry.

House's initial assignment was as an Infantry platoon leader with the 82nd Airborne Division. This was followed by assignments as attack helicopter platoon leader with the 158th Aviation Regiment and commander of the regiment's Company C, 2nd Battalion 101st Airborne Division during the Vietnam War, and commander of Company C, 2nd Battalion, 506th Infantry Regiment, also in Vietnam. Subsequent assignments included assistant professor of military science at Clemson University and assistant plans, operations, and training officer (Assistant S-3) for 1st Battalion, 87th Infantry Regiment. While at Clemson, House completed a master of arts degree in Industrial Education in 1975.

=== Military education ===
Professional development courses House completed during his career included:

- Infantry Officer Basic Course
- Ranger School
- United States Army Airborne School
- Rotary Wing Flight School
- Armor Officer Advanced Course
- United States Army Command and General Staff College
- National War College

== Continued career ==
From 1979 to 1981, House was a test officer for the live fire testing of the Fort Irwin National Training Center, which began operations in 1980. He then served as aide-de-camp to lieutenant generals Marvin D. Fuller and Richard E. Cavazos during their commands of III Armored Corps. He next served as executive officer of 1st Battalion, 12th Cavalry Regiment, which was followed by assignment as deputy chief of staff for the 5th Infantry Division. From March 1983 to May 1985, House commanded 1st Battalion, 61st Infantry Regiment.

After completing his battalion command assignment, House was next posted to the 5th Infantry Division headquarters, where he was assigned as director of plans, operations, training, and mobilization (G-3). His next assignment was in the War Plans Division on the staff of the US Army G-3, which was followed by duty with the Joint Chiefs of Staff, first as executive assistant to the vice director of the joint staff, then as executive assistant to the director. In July 1990, House assumed command of 2nd Brigade, 1st Cavalry Division, which he led in Southwest Asia during Operation Desert Shield and Operation Desert Storm.

After his Gulf War service, House was assigned to the 4th Infantry Division as assistant division commander for operations and training with the rank of brigadier general. During this posting, he performed temporary duty as chief of operations, J-3, for the Joint Task Force Andrew humanitarian aid mission that followed 1992's Hurricane Andrew. From May 1993 to June 1994, he served as deputy commandant of the United States Army Command and General Staff College. In June 1994, House was appointed to command the 1st Infantry Division, and he was subsequently promoted to major general.

== Later career ==
In June 1996, House was assigned as senior military assistant to the Secretary of Defense. In February 1997, he was assigned as the army's assistant chief of staff for installation management. In August 1997, House was assigned as commander of Eighth Army with the rank of lieutenant general. In September 1998, he was assigned as deputy commander of United States Pacific Command. House retired in 2001.

In retirement, House raised cattle and served as president of the Brazos Valley Veterans Memorial Foundation. He was an army senior leader mentor until 2011 and was a guest lecturer at the Bush School of Government and Public Service. House also served on the board of directors of United Services Automobile Association (USAA) and was active at Texas A&M as a member of the Corps Development Council, Corps of Cadets Association, Association of Former Students, and President's Council.

== Awards ==
House's awards and decorations included:

- Defense Distinguished Service Medal with 2 oak leaf clusters
- Army Distinguished Service Medal
- Silver Star
- Defense Superior Service Medal
- Legion of Merit with 2 oak leaf clusters
- Distinguished Flying Cross with 3 oak leaf clusters
- Soldier's Medal
- Bronze Star Medal with oak leaf cluster
- Meritorious Service Medal with 3 oak leaf clusters
- Air Medal with numeral 32
- Army Commendation Medal with oak leaf cluster
- Southwest Asia Service Medal with 3 bronze service stars
- Humanitarian Service Medal
- Vietnam Campaign Medal
- Kuwait Liberation Medal (Kuwait)
- Kuwait Liberation Medal (Saudi Arabia)
- Gallantry Cross (South Vietnam) with 2 silver and 2 bronze service stars
- Combat Infantryman Badge
- Army Aviator Badge
- Parachutist Badge
- Ranger Tab
- Army Staff Identification Badge
- Joint Chiefs of Staff Identification Badge
- Office of the Secretary of Defense Identification Badge

=== Additional honors ===
In 1998, House received the Army Aviation Association of America's Order of Saint Michael (Bronze).

In 2013, House was named a Distinguished Member of the 506th Regiment (DMOR). This honor is bestowed on soldiers who have made significant contributions to mission accomplishment while assigned to the 506th Regiment.

In 2016, House was among the initial inductees into the Army ROTC Hall of Fame. The Hall honors graduates of Army Reserve Officers' Training Corps programs who went on to distinguish themselves in military or civilian endeavors.

In 2019, House was inducted into the Texas A&M Timm Honor Registry. Named for faculty member Tyrus R. Timm, the Registry of Former Students in Agricultural Economics honors graduates who have distinguished themselves in their chosen fields.

In 2020, House was named a Distinguished Alumni Of Texas A&M. An honor conferred by the Association of Former Students of Texas A&M University since 1962, distinguished alumni are selected based on embodying the association's core values of excellence, integrity, leadership, loyalty, respect and selfless service.
