= Marvin D. Fuller =

American Army general (1921–2007)

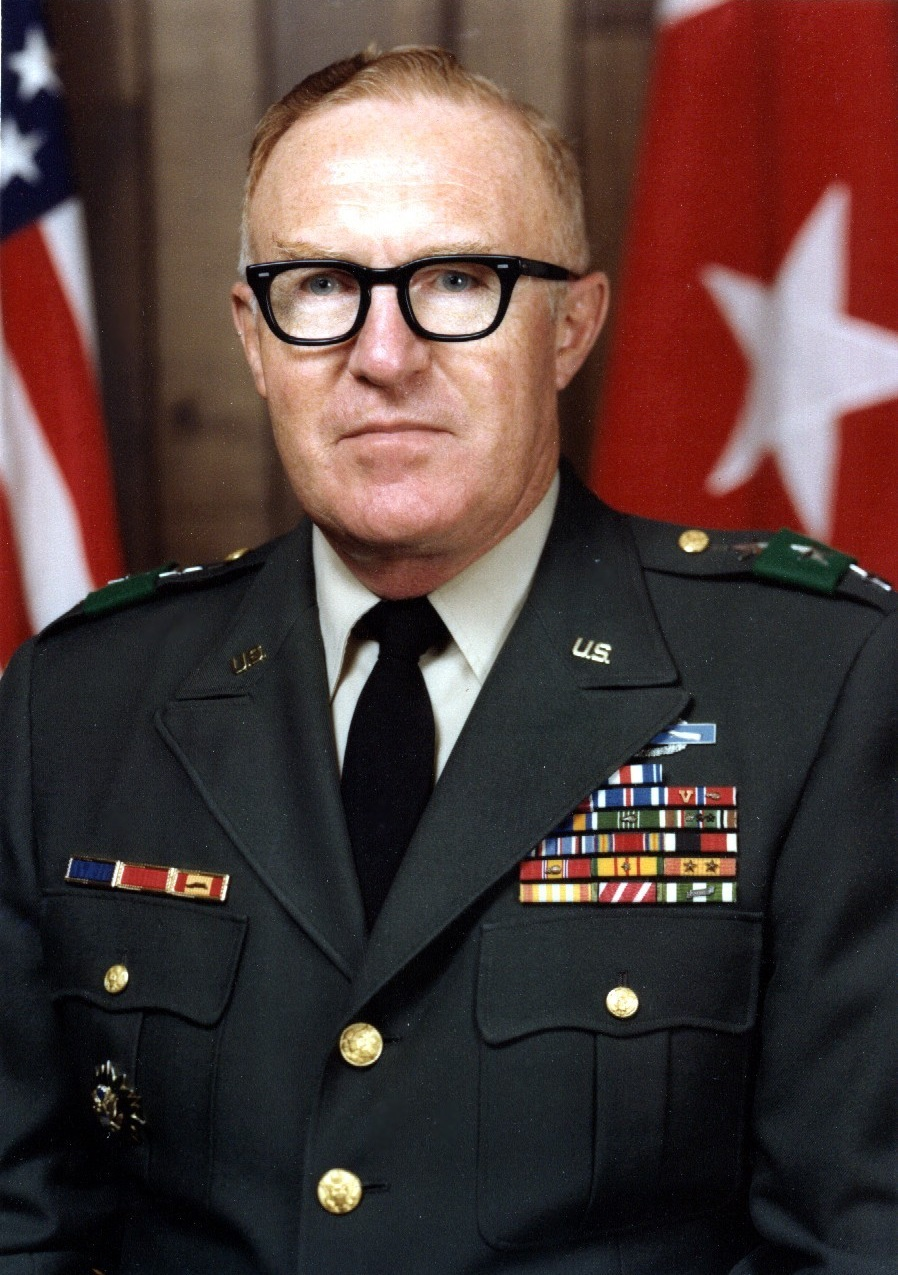
- Born: 10 December 1921; South Dakota
- Died: 12 December 2007 (aged 86)
- Military career
- Allegiance: United States
- Branch: United States Army
- Service years: 1942–1980
- Rank: Lieutenant General
- Commands: III Corps; 1st Infantry Division; 2nd Brigade, 25th Infantry Division
- Conflicts: World War II; Vietnam War
- Awards: Silver Star Medal; Legion of Merit; Distinguished Flying Cross; Bronze Star Medal (2); Air Medal (4)

Marvin Don Fuller (10 December 1921 – 12 December 2007) was a United States Army lieutenant general. He served as Inspector General of the U.S. Army and commanding general of III Corps.

== Early life and education ==
Born and raised in South Dakota, Fuller's education was interrupted by military service during World War II. After the war, he completed an A.B. degree at Dakota Wesleyan University in 1946. Fuller graduated from the Army Infantry School Basic Course in 1950 and Advanced Course in 1954. He earned an M.A. degree from the University of North Dakota in 1957, graduated from the Air Command and Staff College in 1958 and later attended the Naval War College.

== Military career ==
Fuller enlisted in the United States Army Air Forces on 22 July 1942. Trained as a bombardier, he was commissioned as a second lieutenant on 18 March 1944. Listing his hometown as Sioux Falls, South Dakota, Fuller served with the 815th Bombardment Squadron, 483rd Bombardment Group, Fifteenth Air Force based in Sterparone, Italy. During a bombing mission over Munich on 4 October 1944, his B-17G lost two engines and was starting to lose a third. The crew of ten bailed out over Yugoslavia and evaded capture, successfully returning to Allied territory. Fuller was promoted to captain effective 27 March 1945. He earned the Distinguished Flying Cross and four Air Medals for his World War II service.

After being released from active duty in 1945, Fuller remained in the Army Reserve. Recalled to active duty in 1948, he became a regular army infantry officer on 13 October 1949. Fuller was promoted to major in March 1954 and lieutenant colonel in August 1961.

Promoted to colonel in November 1966, Fuller served as commander of the 2nd Brigade, 25th Infantry Division in Vietnam until 6 July 1967. He was awarded the Silver Star, the Legion of Merit and two Bronze Stars for his Vietnam service. His promotion to brigadier general was approved in June 1971.

Promoted to major general, Fuller served as commanding general of the 1st Infantry Division and Fort Riley, Kansas from August 1974 to May 1976.

Promoted to lieutenant general, Fuller served as Inspector General of the U.S. Army from 1976 to 1977. He then became commanding general of III Corps and Fort Hood, Texas from November 1977 to January 1980. Fuller retired from active duty on 31 January 1980.

== Personal ==
Fuller married Myrtle Mais Starr (15 January 1922 – 26 May 2000) on 11 December 1943 in Bernalillo County, New Mexico. She lived in Doland, South Dakota while he was serving in the U.S. Army Air Forces during World War II.

Fuller and his wife were interred together at the Fort Riley Post Cemetery on 24 April 2008.
