= Clement A. Trott =

U.S. Army Major General

Clement Augustus Trott
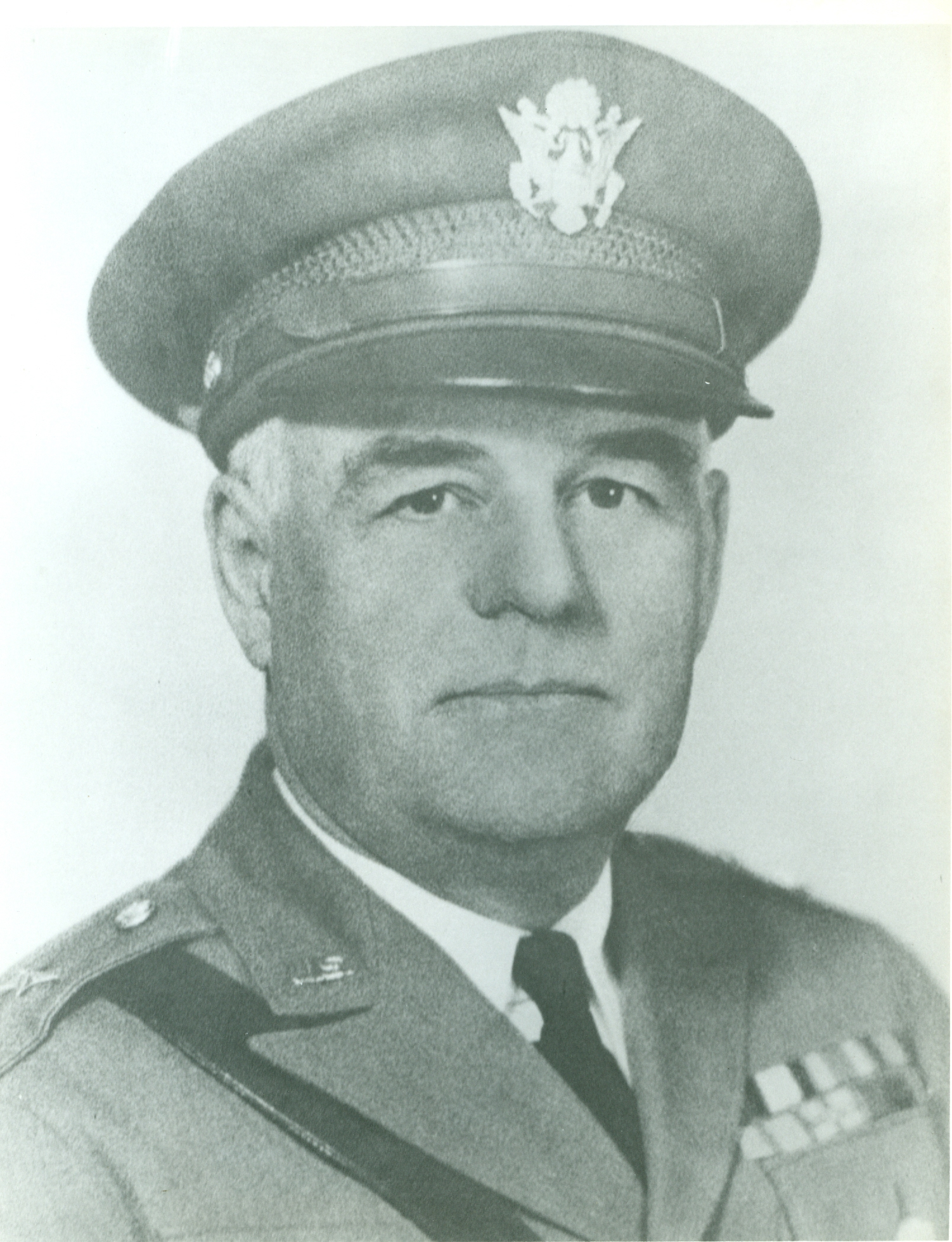
- Born: December 14, 1877; Milwaukee, Wisconsin, US
- Died: April 14, 1950 (aged 72); Geneva, Illinois, US
- Military career
- Allegiance: United States of America
- Branch: United States Army
- Service years: 1899–1941
- Rank: Major general
- Unit: Infantry Branch
- Commands: Fifth Corps Area; 6th Infantry Division
- Conflicts: Philippine–American War; Pancho Villa Expedition; World War I: Battle of Château Thierry; Battle of Saint-Mihiel; Battle of Argonne
- Awards: Distinguished Service Medal; Silver Star; Legion of Honour; Croix de Guerre

Clement Augustus Trott (December 14, 1877 – April 14, 1950) was a highly decorated officer in the United States Army with the rank of major general in the United States Army. A West Point alumnus, Trott participated in the Philippine–American War and World War I, where he distinguished himself as chief of staff of the 5th Division.

Following the War, Trott remained in the Army and rose through the ranks to General officer rank. He completed his career as Commanding general, Fifth Corps Area in September 1941, shortly before the United States entry into World War II.

== Early career ==
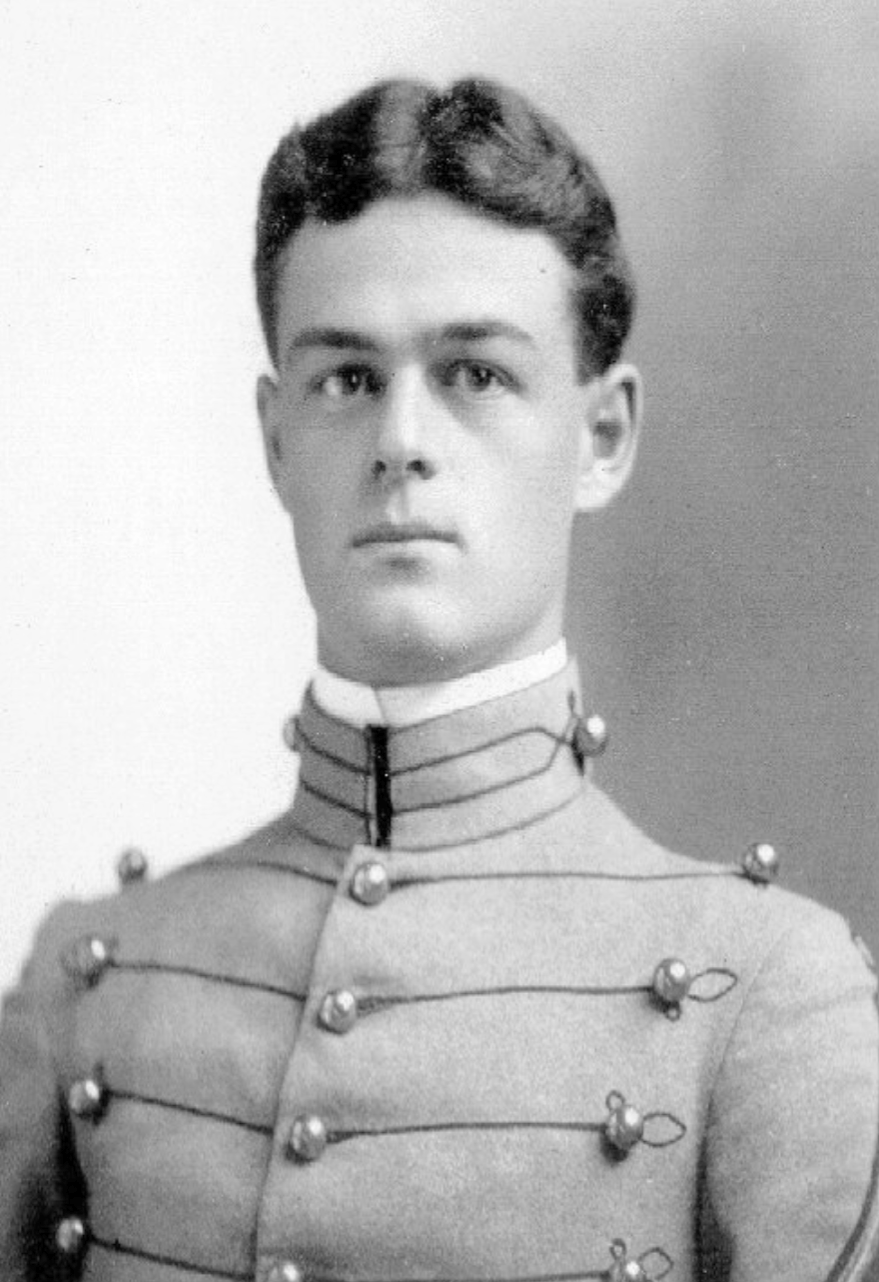
At West Point in 1899

Clement A. Trott was born on December 14, 1877, in Milwaukee, Wisconsin as the son of immigrants from Germany. Following high school, he received an appointment to the United States Military Academy at West Point, New York, where he became active in the baseball team and was nicknamed "The Baron" due to his German ancestry. Trott graduated on February 15, 1899, with Bachelor's degree and was commissioned second lieutenant in the Infantry branch.

Many of his classmates became general officers later: Samuel T. Ansell, Charles M. Bundel, Clifton C. Carter, Stanley D. Embick, Robert C. Foy, Stuart Heintzelman, Charles D. Herron, Evan H. Humphrey, Frederick B. Kerr, Leon Kromer, Duncan K. Major Jr., Edward M. Markham, George Van Horn Moseley, Ephraim G. Peyton, George S. Simonds or James A. Woodruff.

Following the graduation, Trott was ordered to Camp Baker near Walker, Minnesota, for service with 7th Infantry Regiment. The Seventh Infantry was ordered to San Carlos, Arizona, in May 1900 and Trott participated in the guarding of the Mexican Border until August that year, when it was ordered to Fort Logan, Colorado. He was promoted to first lieutenant on September 15, 1900, and joined 5th Infantry Regiment at Fort Sheridan, Illinois.

Trott embarked for the Philippines by the end of March 1901 and participated in the combats against Moro insurgents until November 1903, when he was ordered back to the United States. Upon his arrival stateside, he was stationed at the Plattsburg Barracks until he was ordered to the Infantry and Cavalry School at Fort Leavenworth, Kansas, in August 1904. Trott graduated with honors in July of the following year and attended the Command and Staff College also located there.

He completed the instruction on August 20, 1906, and was promoted to the rank of captain. Trott was subsequently ordered back to the United States Military Academy at West Point and assumed duty as an Instructor in the Department of Law. Due to his interest in the baseball during his tenure at the Academy as a Cadet, Trott accepted additional duty as Manager of the team and brought famous coach Sammy Strang to the team.

Trott left West Point in August 1910 and joined his old outfit, 5th Infantry Regiment at Plattsburg Barracks. He served as an Instructor at the Army School of the Line at Fort Leavenworth, Kansas, from August to December 1912 and then sailed with 8th Infantry Regiment back to the Philippines.

His second tour in that country ended in September 1915, when he returned stateside and joined the 24th Infantry Regiment at the Presidio of San Francisco. Trott served with his new regiment at Presidio until February 1916, then moved to the Fort D.A. Russell, Wyoming. However during Pancho Villa Expedition in March that year, the 24th Infantry joined the punitive expedition to Mexico and participated in the skirmishes with Villa's forces.

== World War I ==
By the beginning of November 1916, Trott returned to the United States and assumed duty as Assistant Professor of Military Science and Tactics at the University of Illinois. During his tenure there, the United States entered the World War and Trott was given a new assignment. He was promoted to major on May 15, 1917, and ordered to Fort Sheridan, Illinois, where he assumed duty, first as Company and then battalion commander within the Officers' Training Camp.

Trott was promoted again, this time to the temporary rank of lieutenant colonel, on August 5, and ordered to Camp Sherman, Ohio, where he joined the newly activated 330th Infantry Regiment, part of the 83rd Division. He was tasked with training of guardsmen of the Ohio National Guard until December 1917 when he embarked for France.

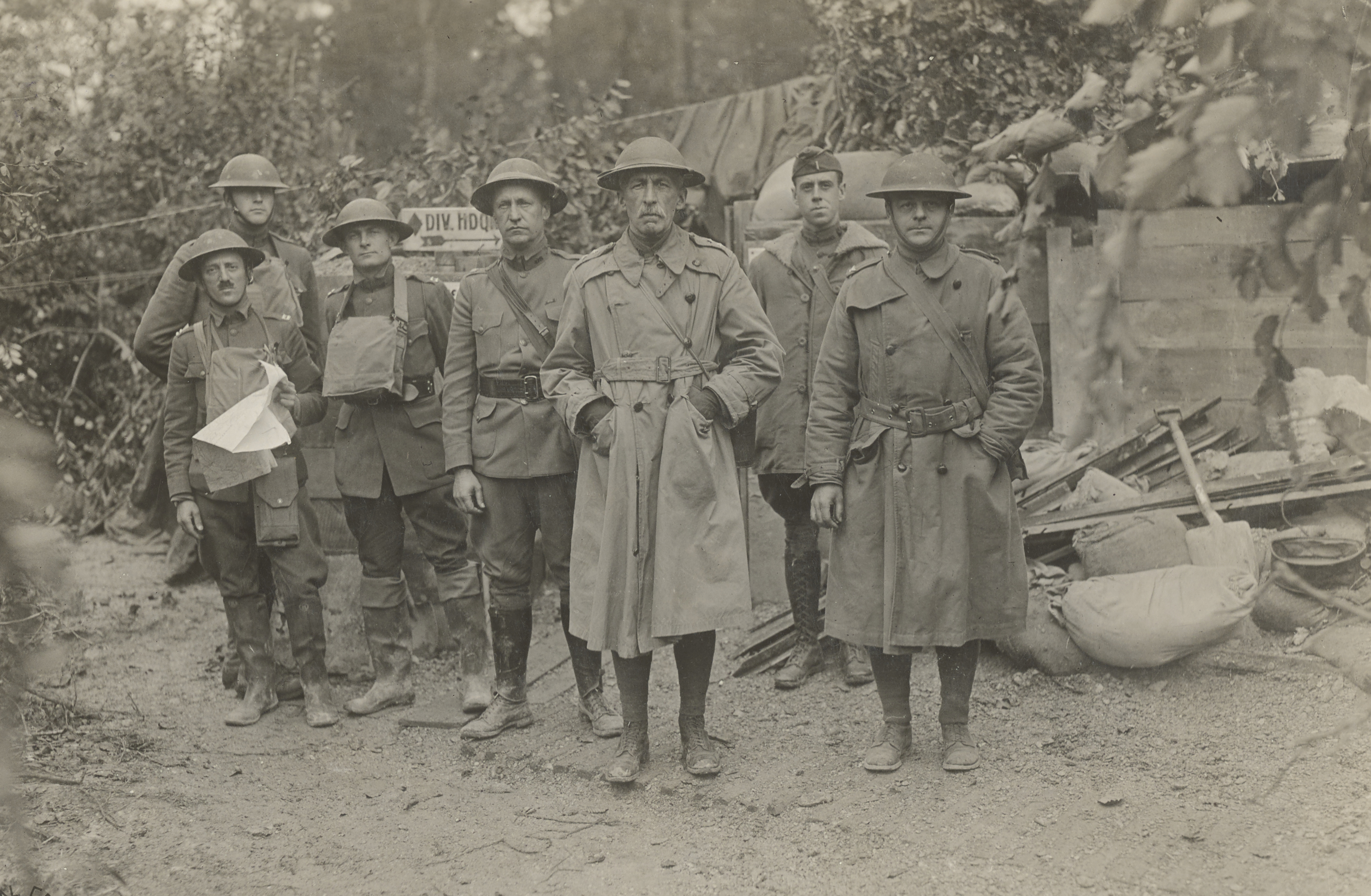
Major General McMahon (center), commander of the 5th Division, and members of his staff in France, October 15, 1918. Stood to the left of McMahon is his chief of staff, Colonel Clement A. Trott.

In January 1918, Trott joined the British 21st Division as an observer. After three weeks in that capacity, he was ordered to the General Staff College of the American Expeditionary Forces (AEF) at Langres. He completed the course and served there as an instructor until the end of June 1918, when he served again as an observer, now with the American 1st and 2nd Divisions during the hard fighting around Château Thierry and Montdidier.

Trott then rejoined the 83rd Division in early July and served as chief of staff of the division, commanded by Major General Edwin F. Glenn, which had only recently arrived in France. The division did not see any action as a complete formation and instead provided replacements for other combat formations in the AEF. Trott was meanwhile promoted to the temporary rank of colonel on July 30, and soon joined the headquarters of the 5th Division as its chief of staff under Major General John E. McMahon.

The 5th Division, a Regular Army formation (although in practise it was composed largely of draftees with only a relatively small number of professional soldiers), was a completely different kind of formation than his previous experience with the 83rd Division, and Trott had the opportunity to participate in the planning and execution of large-scale military operations. He served in that capacity during the Battle of Saint-Mihiel in mid-September and then during the Meuse–Argonne offensive in October–November that year. Trott distinguished himself in this capacity and was praised by both commanders of the 5th Division, McMahon and his successor, Major General Hanson E. Ely, who relieved McMahon in mid-October. Following the armistice with Germany in November 1918, the 5th Division marched to Luxembourg, where it was stationed near Esch-sur-Alzette for occupation duty until the beginning of July 1919.

For his service in France, he was decorated with both the Army Distinguished Service Medal and the Silver Star for his visits to the frontline during battle. The citation for his Army DSM reads:

The President of the United States of America, authorized by Act of Congress, July 9, 1918, takes pleasure in presenting the Army Distinguished Service Medal to Colonel (Infantry) Clement Augusta Trott, United States Army, for exceptionally meritorious and distinguished services to the Government of the United States, in a duty of great responsibility during World War I. As Chief of Staff of the 5th Division, through his intimate knowledge of staff duties and the requirements of troops of the line, Colonel Trott organized a staff which insured efficient cooperation in combat. His ability was shown in sound tactical directions to his division, which insured successes in four offensive operations.

In addition to his American awards, he was appointed an Officer of the Legion of Honour and received the Croix de Guerre with Palm from the French.

== Interwar period ==
Trott returned to the United States by the end of July 1919 and reverted to the peacetime rank of major. He was subsequently ordered to the Army War College in Washington, D.C., and graduated from the senior course in June 1920. Following the graduation, Trott was promoted back to lieutenant colonel on July 1, 1920, and ordered to Camp Grant, Illinois, where he assumed command of 54th Infantry Regiment.

He served in this capacity until January 1921, when he was ordered to the Office of the Chief of Infantry under Major general Walter H. Gordon. Trott served in Training section of that office and was promoted to colonel on November 2, 1921. He was sent to the Governors Island, New York City, in July 1924 and joined the headquarters, Second Corps Area under Major general Robert L. Bullard as Liaison Officer, Organized Reserves.

Trott assumed command of 17th Infantry Regiment at Fort Crook, Nebraska, in May 1926 and served in this capacity until June 1930, when he was appointed Chief of Staff, 94th Division under Major general Fox Conner. The 94th Division served as the part of Massachusetts Organized Reserve and Trott served four year at its headquarters in Boston.

Divisional headquarters of 94th Division was moved to Montpelier, Vermont, in June 1933 and Trott assumed additional duty as Commander of 6th Civilian Conservation Corps District during the Great Depression.

In August 1934, Trott was transferred to Fort D.A. Russell, Wyoming and served as Commanding officer, 20th Infantry Regiment until the end of August 1935, when he received word about his nomination to the general's officer rank.

Trott was promoted to the rank of Brigadier general on September 1, 1935, and assumed command of 6th Infantry Brigade at Fort Douglas, Utah. He also simultaneously commanded the Fort Douglas and remained in that capacities until March 1936. He then commanded 18th Infantry Brigade in Boston until May 1937 and 22nd Infantry Brigade at Schofield Barracks, Hawaii until July 1939. Following his return to the United States, Trott commanded 16th Infantry Brigade at Camp Meade, Maryland and also the Post.

== World War II and retirement ==
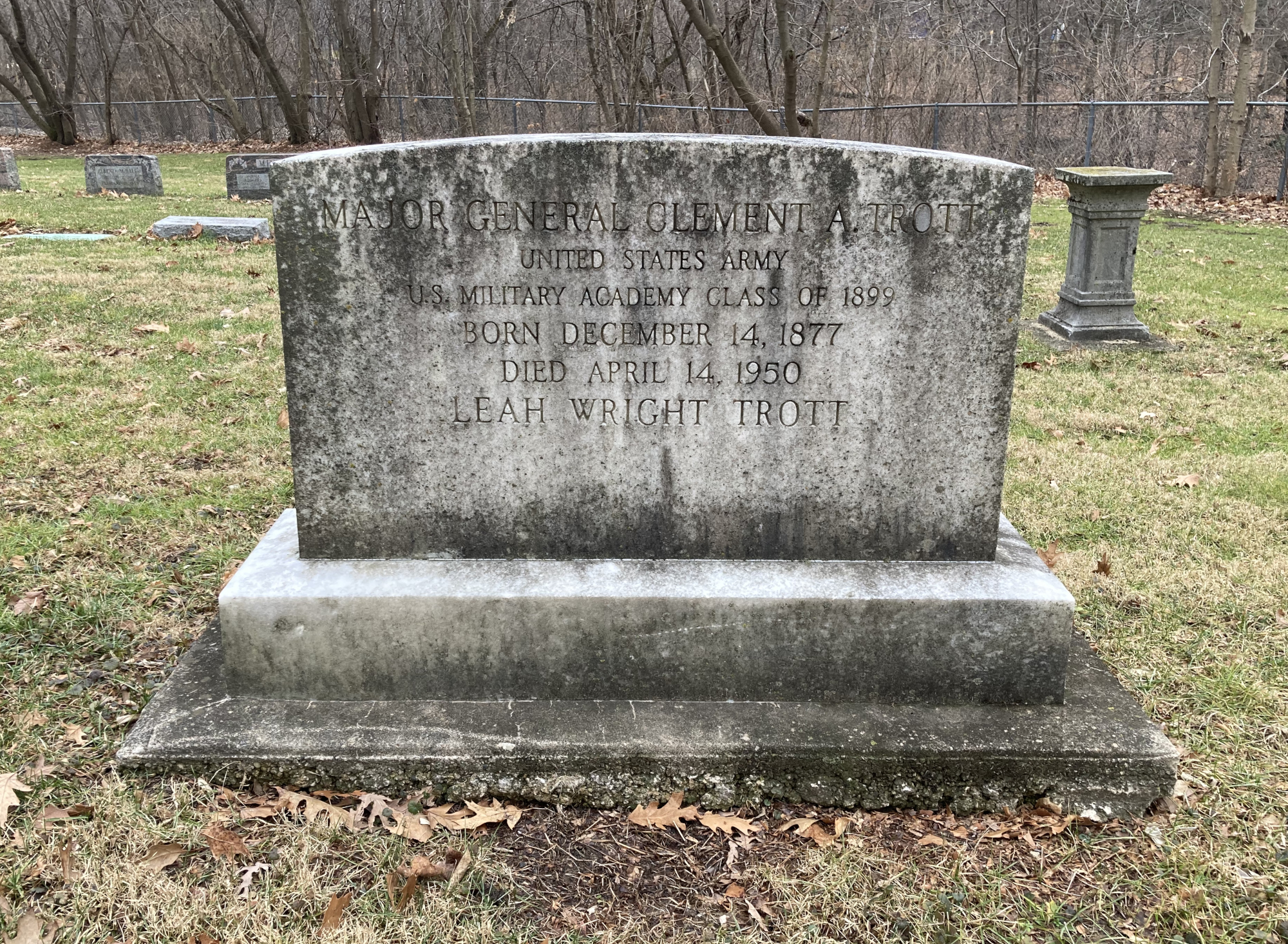
Trott's grave at Oak Hill Cemetery

With the outbreak of World War II in Europe in September 1939, Trott was ordered to Camp Jackson, South Carolina, and was tasked with organization of reactivated 6th Infantry Division. He supervised the formation and training of 1st, 3rd and 20th Infantry Regiments, the 1st and 80th Artillery Regiments, the 8th Medical Battalion and the 6th Engineer Battalion which were subordinated to the Division.

After one year with the division, Trott was transferred to Fort Hayes, Ohio and assumed command of Fifth Corps Area. While in this capacity, he was promoted to the rank of Major general on April 3, 1941. This command completed 42 years of his service, when he was relieved of duties on September 29, 1941, and ordered home pending retirement. He was finally retired on December 31, 1941, and was not recalled to active duty during World War II due to his age and health.

Trott settled in Geneva, Illinois, where he played golf and was interested in reading and athletics. Major general Clement A. Trott died on April 14, 1950, at his home in Geneva and is buried at Oak Hill Cemetery. His wife, Leah Wright Trott is buried beside him.

== Decorations ==
Here is Major general Trott's ribbon bar:

1st Row	Army Distinguished Service Medal		Silver Star	
2nd Row	Spanish War Service Medal	Philippine Campaign Medal	Mexican Service Medal	World War I Victory Medal with four Battle Clasps
3rd Row	American Defense Service Medal	World War II Victory Medal	Officer of the Legion of Honor (France)	French Croix de guerre 1914-1918 with Palm

== See also ==
- List of foreign recipients of the Légion d'Honneur

Military offices
Preceded by Campbell B. Hodges	Commanding General, Fifth Corps Area; November 2, 1940 – September 29, 1941	Succeeded by Daniel Van Voorhis
Preceded by Division reactivated	Commanding General, 6th Infantry Division; October 10, 1939 – October 1, 1940	Succeeded by Frederick E. Uhl
