= Charles M. Bundel =

United States Army general (1875–1941)

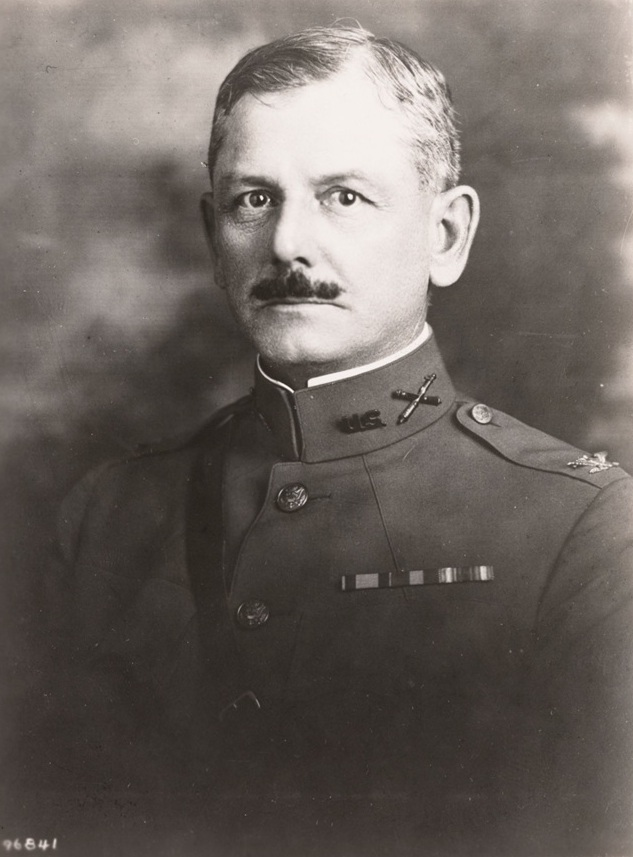
- Bundel as a colonel in 1932
- Born: 2 June 1875; Sharon, Pennsylvania, US
- Died: 15 October 1941 (aged 66); San Francisco, California, US
- Burial place: West Point Cemetery
- Education: United States Military Academy; United States Army Command and General Staff College; United States Army War College
- Spouse: Enid Valentine (m. 1913–1941)
- Military career
- Service: United States Army
- Service years: 1899–1939
- Rank: Brigadier General
- Service number: O773
- Units: US Army Infantry Branch; US Army Field Artillery Branch
- Commands: 325th Field Artillery Regiment; 159th Field Artillery Brigade; 109th Field Artillery Regiment; 53rd Field Artillery Brigade; 76th Field Artillery Regiment; Army Service Schools; War Plans and Command Divisions, United States Army War College; 12th Field Artillery Regiment; 1st Field Artillery Regiment; School Troops Division, U.S. Army Field Artillery School; 3rd Field Artillery Brigade; United States Army Command and General Staff College; Fort Leavenworth; Missouri–Kansas District, Civilian Conservation Corps
- Wars: Philippine–American War; Pancho Villa Expedition; Mexican Border War; World War I

Charles M. Bundel (2 June 1875 – 15 September 1941) was a career officer in the United States Army. An 1899 graduate of the United States Military Academy at West Point, Bundel was a veteran of the Philippine–American War, Pancho Villa Expedition, Mexican Border War, and World War I and attained the rank of brigadier general.

A native of Sharon, Pennsylvania, Bundel was raised and educated in Sharon and in 1895 he obtained an appointment to West Point. He graduated in 1899 and was commissioned in the Infantry. From 1899 to 1902, he performed Philippine–American War duty with the 4th Infantry Regiment. Subsequent postings included additional service in the Philippines, as well as Alaska and Mexican Border War duty in Arizona. He completed the Army School of the Line as an Honor Graduate in 1916.

In 1917, Bundel transferred to the Field Artillery and during the First World War he commanded the 325th Field Artillery regiment during training in Kentucky and combat in France. After the war, Bundel was appointed commandant of the Army Service Schools and a member of the faculty. He graduated from the United States Army Command and General Staff College in 1921 and the United States Army War College in 1925.

Bundel was a member of the Army War College faculty from 1925 to 1929. Between 1929 and 1936, he commanded first the 12th Field Artillery Regiment, then the 1st Field Artillery Regiment, served as chief of staff of the Third Corps Area, and commanded the 3rd Field Artillery Brigade. From 1936 to 1939, he served as commandant of the Command and General Staff College. Bundel left the army upon reaching the mandatory retirement age of 64 in 1939. In retirement, he resided in San Francisco, where he died on 15 September 1941. He was buried at West Point Cemetery.

== Early life ==
Charles Michael Bundel was born in Sharon, Pennsylvania on 2 June 1875, a son of Charles Edward Bundel and Sarah Elizabeth (Murphy) Bundel. He was raised and educated in Sharon, and was a graduate of Sharon High School. In February 1895, he received an appointment to the United States Military Academy (West Point) from US Representative Alexander McDowell.

Bundel attended West Point from June 1895 to February 1899, when his class graduated four months early because of the need for trained officers during the Spanish–American War and Philippine–American War. Bundel was ranked 42nd of 72, and several of his classmates also went on to careers as general officers, including: James Albert Woodruff; Edward Murphy Markham; Thomas Herbert Jackson; Herman Walter Schull; Leon Benjamin Kromer; George Sherwin Simonds; Stanley Dunbar Embick; Samuel Tilden Ansell; Evan Harris Humphrey; Clement Augustus Trott; George Van Horn Moseley; Wilson Bryant Burtt; Stuart Heintzelman; Laurence Halstead; Charles Douglas Herron; Frederick Blair Kerr; Robert Cherry Foy; Duncan Kennedy Major Jr.; and Ephraim Geoffrey Peyton.

== Start of career ==
After graduation, Bundel was commissioned as a second lieutenant of Infantry and assigned to the 4th Infantry Regiment, which performed Philippine–American War duty in the Philippines from March 1899 to September 1900. He then promoted to first lieutenant and transferred to the 25th Infantry Regiment, with which he remained in the Philippines until July 1902. He served with his regiment at Fort Reno, Indian Territory from August 1902 to January 1906, and was stationed in Oklahoma City as acting engineer officer for the army's Southwestern Division from January to July 1906. In August 1906, he was posted to West Point as an instructor of Infantry tactics, and he remained there until May 1907. Bundel was promoted to captain in October 1906. Bundel's promotion was in the 16th Infantry Regiment, and from May to September 1907, he traveled to the Philippines to join his new unit and returned to the United States.

From September to November 1907, Bundel was stationed with the 16th Infantry at Fort Crook, Nebraska. In November and December 1907, he performed temporary duty at Gettysburg, South Dakota during a dispute with the Ute people, who had traveled from Utah to the Black Hills after encroachments on the Uintah and Ouray Indian Reservation by white residents left the Utes with a smaller allotment than what they had been promised by treaty. By 1908, US military and government intervention resulted in the return of most Utes to Utah. After his Ute uprising duty, Bundel returned to Fort Crook. From July 1910 to June 1912, he served as adjutant of the 16th Infantry during its posting to Fort William H. Seward, Alaska Territory. He was with the 16th Infantry at the Presidio of San Francisco from July 1912 to April 1914, and at Fort Bliss, Texas from April 1914 to July 1915.

== Continued career ==
From August 1915 to May 1916, Bundel was a student at the Army School of the Line, and he completed the course as the first honor graduate. From May 1916 to February 1917, he took part in the Pancho Villa Expedition, after which he transferred from Infantry to Field Artillery. Bundel received promotion to major in July 1916. He performed Mexican Border War duty at Camp Harry J. Jones with the 10th Field Artillery Regiment from February to August 1917 and was promoted to lieutenant colonel in May 1917. With the army expanding after American entry into World War I in April 1917, he was promoted to temporary colonel in August 1917. Assigned to command the 325th Field Artillery Regiment at Camp Zachary Taylor, Kentucky, he led the organization through its initial organization and training. He was then ordered to Fort Sill, Oklahoma, where he was a student at the Field Artillery School of Fire until June 1918.

After temporary duty at the West Point, Kentucky Field Artillery Training center from June to September 1918, Bundel deployed to France, where he attended the course at the Field Artillery Firing Center at Camp de Souge near Bordeaux. From November to December 1918, he commanded the 159th Field Artillery Brigade at Langres. The Armistice of November 11, 1918 ended the war, after which Bundel remained in Europe as part of the Occupation of the Rhineland. He was a student at the Center of Artillery Studies in Langres from December 1918 to January 1919, after which he was assigned to command the 109th Field Artillery Regiment at Bazougers. Between February and April 1919, Bundel was interim commander of the 53rd Field Artillery brigade on several occasions. In April 1919, he was assigned to command the 76th Field Artillery Regiment at Kottenheim, where he remained until returning to the United States in June 1919.

== Later career ==
After returning to the United States following the First World War, in July Bundel was assigned to the faculty of the Army School of the Line. He was the director of the Command and General Staff School from July 1919 to July 1924, and in August 1919 he returned to his permanent rank of lieutenant colonel. He graduated from the United States Army Command and General Staff College in 1921, and was promoted to colonel the following November. He attended the United States Army War College from September 1924 to July 1925, after which he was assigned to the War College as a faculty member and director of the War Plans and Command divisions. From July 1929 to August 1930, Bundel commanded the 12th Field Artillery Regiment at Fort Sill. In September 1930, he was transferred to command of the 1st Field Artillery Regiment and the Field Artillery School's School Troops Division.

In February 1932, Bundel was assigned as assistant chief of staff for logistics (G-4) for the Third Corps Area in Baltimore. In September 1934, he was promoted to brigadier general and briefly assigned as the Third Corps Area's chief of staff. Later that month, he was appointed to command of the 3rd Field Artillery Brigade at Fort Lewis, Washington. In June 1936, he was assigned as Commandant of the United States Army Command and General Staff College, and he held this post until reaching the mandatory retirement age of 64 in June 1939. While serving as commandant, Bundel was also commander of the post at Fort Leavenworth and commander of the Civilian Conservation Corps' Missouri–Kansas District. In retirement, Bundel resided in San Francisco, where he died on 15 September 1941. He was buried at West Point Cemetery.

=== Legacy ===
Bundel Avenue, a Fort Leavenworth road near the Lewis and Clark Center, was named in Bundel's honor.

== Works by ==
(Partial list):

- "Some Important and Timely Problems for the Field Artilleryman" (PDF). The Field Artillery Journal. Washington, DC: US Field Artillery Association. November–December 1921. pp. 581–591.
- "The Methods of War at Gettysburg". Infantry Journal. Washington, DC: United States Infantry Association. August 1929. pp. 109–124.
- "With the Twelfth In the War In South Texas" (PDF). The Field Artillery Journal. Washington, DC: US Field Artillery Association. July–August 1930. pp. 396–407.

== Dates of rank ==
Bundel's dates of rank were:

- Second Lieutenant, 15 February 1899
- First Lieutenant, 23 September 1900
- Captain, 20 October 1906
- Major, 1 July 1916
- Lieutenant Colonel, 15 May 1917
- Colonel (National Army), 5 August 1917
- Lieutenant Colonel, 31 August 1919
- Colonel, 5 November 1921
- Brigadier General, 1 September 1934
- Brigadier General (Retired), 30 June 1939
