= George S. Simonds =

United States Army general

George Sherwin Simonds
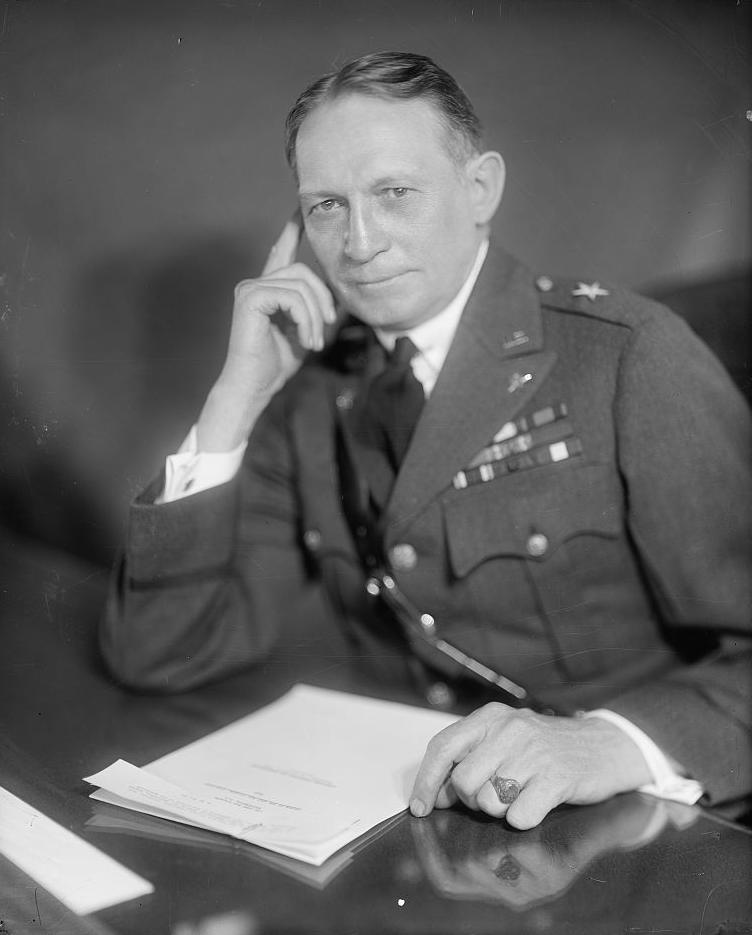
- Born: March 12, 1874; Cresco, Iowa, U.S.
- Died: November 1, 1938 (aged 64); San Francisco, California, U.S.
- Burial place: West Point Cemetery
- Military career
- Allegiance: United States of America
- Branch: United States Army
- Service years: 1899–1938
- Rank: Major General
- Service number: 0-764
- Commands: Fourth Army; IX Corps; Deputy Chief of Staff of the United States Army; United States Army War College
- Conflicts: Philippine–American War; World War I
- Awards: Distinguished Service Medal

George Sherwin Simonds (March 12, 1874 – November 1, 1938) was a U.S. Army officer with the rank of major general.

== Early life ==
He was born in Cresco, Iowa on March 12, 1874, the son of son of William O. Simonds and Ellen Sherwin Simonds .

== Military career ==
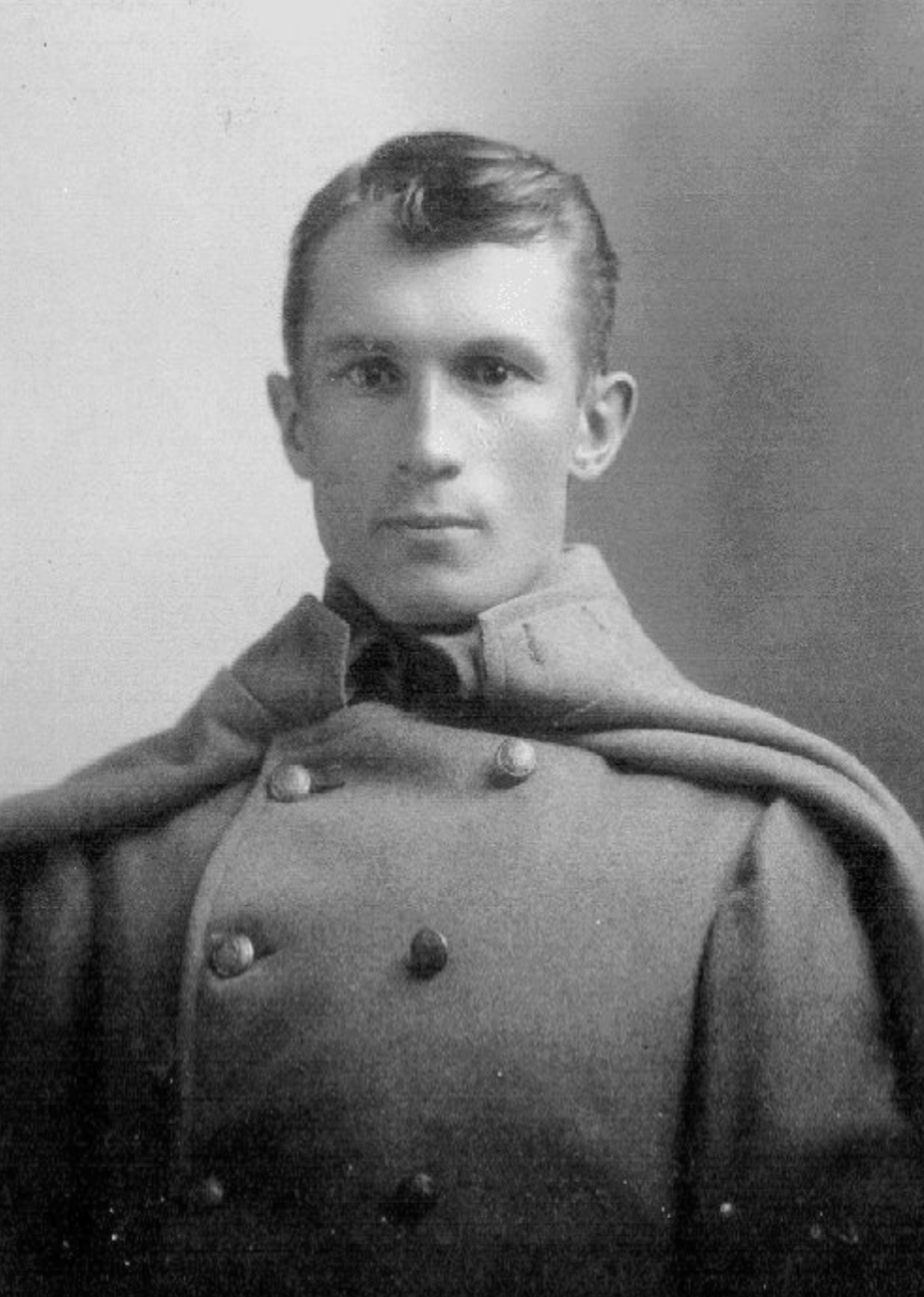
At West Point in 1899

He graduated (26th out of a class of 72) from the United States Military Academy (USMA) at West Point, New York in 1899. Many of his classmates became general officers later in their military careers: Samuel T. Ansell, Charles M. Bundel, Clifton C. Carter, Stanley D. Embick, Robert C. Foy, Stuart Heintzelman, Charles D. Herron, Evan H. Humphrey, Frederick B. Kerr, Leon Kromer, Duncan K. Major Jr., Edward M. Markham, George Van Horn Moseley, Ephraim G. Peyton, Clement A. Trott and James A. Woodruff.

After graduation, he was assigned to the 22d Infantry. He served in the Philippines and China. He returned to West Point in 1904 as an instructor in the Department of Law. In addition from 1915 to 1917, he also taught in the Department of Tactics.

After the American entry into World War I in April 1917, he was sent to France as an observer. After returning to America, he was assigned to the General Staff of the General Headquarters of the American Expeditionary Forces (AEF) and returned to France again later in 1917. Simonds, promoted in August 1917 to lieutenant colonel, was Chief of Staff of the 2nd Corps, AEF, commanded by Major General George Windle Read. He received a temporary promotion to colonel in June 1918 and to brigadier general that October. Simonds received the Army Distinguished Service Medal for service in the war. The medal's citation reads:

The President of the United States of America, authorized by Act of Congress, July 9, 1918, takes pleasure in presenting the Army Distinguished Service Medal to Brigadier General George Sherwin Simonds, United States Army, for exceptionally meritorious and distinguished services to the Government of the United States, in a duty of great responsibility during World War I. General Simonds served with marked distinction as Chief of Staff of the 2d Army Corps during the important operations along the Hindenburg line in the region of the Sambre Canal. His great administrative ability was shown in the excellent manner in which he handled a large force of American soldiers serving with the British.

After the war, Simonds graduated from the Army War College in 1920 and was promoted to colonel in July 1921. He was promoted to brigadier general in November 1924. Simonds commanded the tank center until 1925, and was succeeded by James K. Parsons.

Brigadier General Simonds served as Chief of the War Plans Division of the War Department from September 1, 1927 to September 1, 1931.

In 1932, he was assigned to run the Army War College. Previously he was Douglas MacArthur's chief war planner, and his appointment was made to improve the planning ability in the Army War College.

Simonds was promoted to major general in 1933.

Simonds served as Deputy Chief of Staff in the War Department from February 2, 1935 to May 28, 1936.

In June 1936, Simonds took command of the Fourth United States Army and Ninth Corps Area; the headquarters was at the Presidio of San Francisco.

Simonds retired from the Army at San Francisco in 1938.

== Death and legacy ==
He died on November 1, 1938 and was buried in the West Point Cemetery. The ship USAT General George S. Simonds was named for him.
