= George Simonds =

George Simonds may refer to:

- George Blackall Simonds (1843–1929), British sculptor
- George Simonds, his father, British brewer at H & G Simonds Brewery
- George S. Simonds (1874–1938), US military officer
