= 1st Field Artillery Regiment (United States) =

US military unit

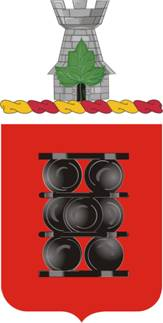
- Coat of arms
- Active: 1907
- Country: (United States)
- Branch: United States Army
- Type: Field artillery
- Role: USARS parent regiment
- Size: Regiment
- Motto: Primus aut Nullus (First or Not at All)
- Branch color: Scarlet
- Engagements: Indian Wars; Seminoles; Mexican War; American Civil War; Spanish-American War; Philippine Insurrection; World War II; Pacific War; Operation Desert Storm; War on terrorism; Afghanistan; Iraq

Commanders
- Notable commanders: Charles M. Bundel

Insignia
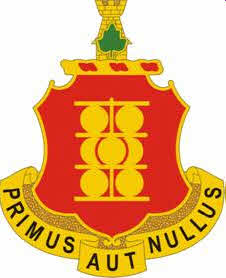
- Distinctive unit insignia

The 1st Field Artillery Regiment is a Field Artillery regiment of the United States Army first formed in 1907. The regiment served with the 4th Division and 6th Division before World War II and (as the 1st Field Artillery Battalion) with the 6th Infantry Division during and after World War II through 1956. Currently organized as a parent regiment under the U.S. Army Regimental System, elements of the regiment have served with the 1st Armored and 5th Infantry Divisions and with various artillery groups. The lineages of some of the units that make up the 1st Field Artillery include campaign credit for the War of 1812. The regiment carries battle streamers for campaigns in the Indian Wars, Mexican War, Civil War, Spanish–American War, and Philippine Insurrection (earned by forebears of some regimental elements), for World War II, and Southwest Asia and the Global War on Terror.

== History ==
The 1st Field Artillery Regiment was first activated in 1907 from numbered companies of artillery. It was first organized with 2 battalions at Fort Riley, Kansas.

== Lineage and honors ==
=== Lineage ===
- Constituted 25 January 1907 in the Regular Army as the 1st Field Artillery.
- Organized 31 May 1907 from new and existing units at Fort Riley, Kansas.
- Assigned 1 October 1933 to the 4th Division.
- Relieved 16 October 1939 from assignment to the 4th Division and assigned to the 6th Division (later redesignated as the 6th Infantry Division).
- Reorganized and redesignated 1 October 1940 as the 1st Field Artillery Battalion.
- Inactivated 25 January 1949 in Korea. Activated 4 October 1950 at Fort Ord, California.
- Relieved 3 April 1956 from assignment to the 6th Infantry Division.
- Inactivated 15 May 1958 at the United States Military Academy, West Point, New York.
- Consolidated 19 March 1959 with Headquarters and Headquarters Battery, 1st Antiaircraft Artillery Group, and the 1st and 54th Antiaircraft Artillery Missile Battalions (all organized in 1821 as the 1st Regiment of Artillery) to form the 1st Artillery, a parent regiment under the Combat Arms Regimental System.
- 1st Artillery (less former Headquarters and Headquarters Battery, 1st Antiaircraft Artillery Group, and the 1st and 54th Antiaircraft Artillery Missile Battalions) reorganized and redesignated 1 September 1971 as the 1st Field Artillery (former elements concurrently reorganized and redesignated as the 1st Air Defense Artillery — hereafter separate lineage).
- 1st Field Artillery withdrawn 16 January 1988 from the Combat Arms Regimental System and reorganized under the United States Army Regimental System.

=== Campaign participation credit ===
- Indian Wars: Seminoles
- Mexican War: Palo Alto; Resaca de la Palma; Monterey
- Civil War: Peninsula; Manassas; Antietam; Fredericksburg; Chancellorsville; Gettysburg; Wilderness; Spotsylvania; Cold Harbor; Petersburg; Virginia 1862; Virginia 1863; Virginia 1864; West Virginia 1863
- War with Spain: Puerto Rico
- Philippine Insurrection: Malolos; San Isidro; Zapote River; Luzon 1899; Luzon 1900
- World War II: New Guinea (with arrowhead); Luzon (with arrowhead); Southwest Asia; Defense of Saudi Arabia; Liberation and Defense of Kuwait; Cease-Fire
- War on Terrorism: Campaigns to be determined
  - Afghanistan: Transition I
  - Iraq: Transition of Iraq

Note: Neither the lineage published by McKenney in 2010 nor the lineage for 4th Battalion posted on the CMH website (as of 2013) list any War on Terrorism campaigns. Participation taken from the dates of unit awards listed below.

=== Decorations ===
- Valorous Unit Award, Streamer embroidered IRAQ (2d Battalion, 1st Field Artillery, cited; DA GO 12, 1994)
- Valorous Unit Award, Streamer embroidered IRAQ-KUWAIT (3d Battalion, 1st Field Artillery, cited; DA GO 12, 1994)
- Valorous Unit Award, Streamer embroidered IRAQ 2003 (4th Battalion, 1st Field Artillery, cited; DA GO 14, 2009)
- Meritorious Unit Commendation (Army), Streamer embroidered AFGHANISTAN 2011-2012 (4th Battalion, 1st Field Artillery, cited: DA GO 80, 2013)
- Philippine Presidential Unit Citation, Streamer embroidered 17 OCTOBER 1944 TO 4 JULY 1945 (6th Infantry Division cited; DA GO 47, 1950)

== Heraldry ==
=== Distinctive unit insignia ===
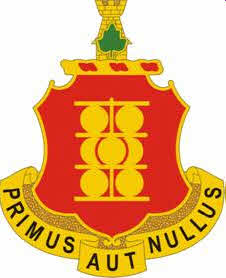

- Description: A gold color metal and enamel device 1 1/4 inches (3.2 cm) in height consisting of the shield, crest and motto of the coat of arms.
- Background: The distinctive unit insignia was originally approved for the 1st Field Artillery Regiment on 27 November 1923. It was re-designated for the 1st Field Artillery Battalion on 8 March 1951. It was cancelled on 21 April 1959. In the period from 1959 to 1971, a new crest was authorized for the Second Battalion, First Field Artillery, bearing the motto, "Primus Inter Pares", "First Among Equals". The motto of the 2/1st Artillery has remained the same, "A little more grape Captain Bragg", which is illustrated on the crest with a canister of grape shot. The crest was restored and authorized for the 1/1st Field Artillery Regiment on 1 September 1971, and the insignia was again amended to its current image on 16 February 1979.

=== Coat of arms ===
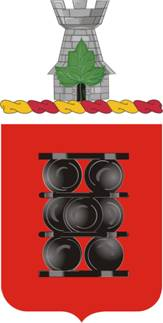

- Blazon
  - Shield: Gules, a stand of grape Proper.
  - Crest: On a wreath of the colors Or and Gules, a masonry tower Proper charged with a maple leaf Vert.
- Symbolism
  - Shield: The shield is scarlet for Artillery. The stand of grape is to commemorate the remark attributed to General Zachary Taylor at the Battle of Buena Vista, "A little more grape, Captain Bragg."
  - Crest: The tower represents participation of a battery under Major Robert Anderson in the defense of Fort Sumter in 1861. The maple leaf commemorates service in the War of 1812, in Canada.
- Background: The coat of arms was originally approved for the 1st Field Artillery Regiment on 16 February 1921. It was redesignated for the 1st Field Artillery Battalion on 8 March 1951. It was cancelled on 21 April 1959. It was restored and authorized for the 1st Field Artillery Regiment on 1 September 1971.

== See also ==
- Field Artillery Branch (United States)
- U.S. Army Coast Artillery Corps
