= Dennis E. Nolan =

United States Army general (1872–1956)

Dennis Edward Nolan
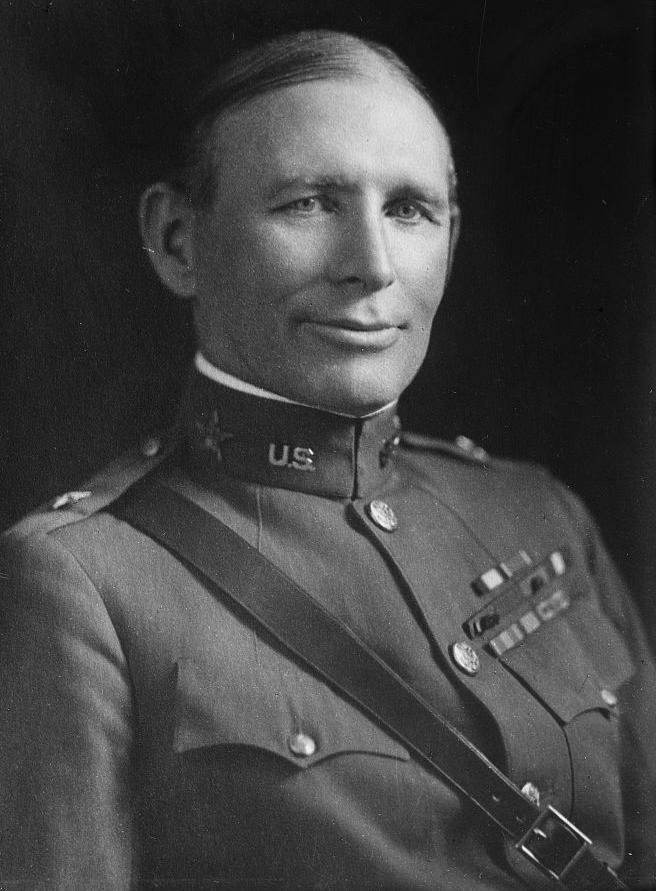
- Born: April 22, 1872; Akron, New York, U.S.
- Died: February 24, 1956 (aged 83); New York, New York, U.S.
- Burial place: Arlington National Cemetery
- Military career
- Allegiance: United States
- Branch: United States Army
- Service years: 1896–1936
- Rank: Major General
- Service number: 0-83
- Commands: First United States Army; Second Corps Area; Fifth Corps Area; 2nd Infantry Division; 55th Brigade, 28th Infantry Division
- Conflicts: Spanish–American War; Philippine–American War; World War I
- Awards: Distinguished Service Cross; Army Distinguished Service Medal; Silver Star (2)
- Other work: President, United States Military Academy Association of Graduates

Dennis Edward Nolan (April 22, 1872 – February 24, 1956) was a career officer with the United States Army. He distinguished himself by heading the first modern American military combat intelligence function during World War I. Nolan served as the head football coach at the United States Military Academy in 1902, compiling a record of 6–1–1.

== Early life and education ==
Born in Akron, New York, outside of Buffalo, New York, Nolan was the son of an Irish immigrant. He graduated from the United States Military Academy in 1896.

== Spanish–American War ==
Nolan was commissioned a second lieutenant and joined the Third Infantry. He served with the Sanitary Corps, during the Spanish–American War.

== Football coaching career ==
In 1902, Nolan coached the Army football team to a record of 6 wins, 1 loss and 1 draw. The New York Times of 1930s noted that many contemporary generals (Nolan, Leon Kromer, Malin Craig, Paul Bunker) were connected by past football experience at West Point.

== Later military career ==
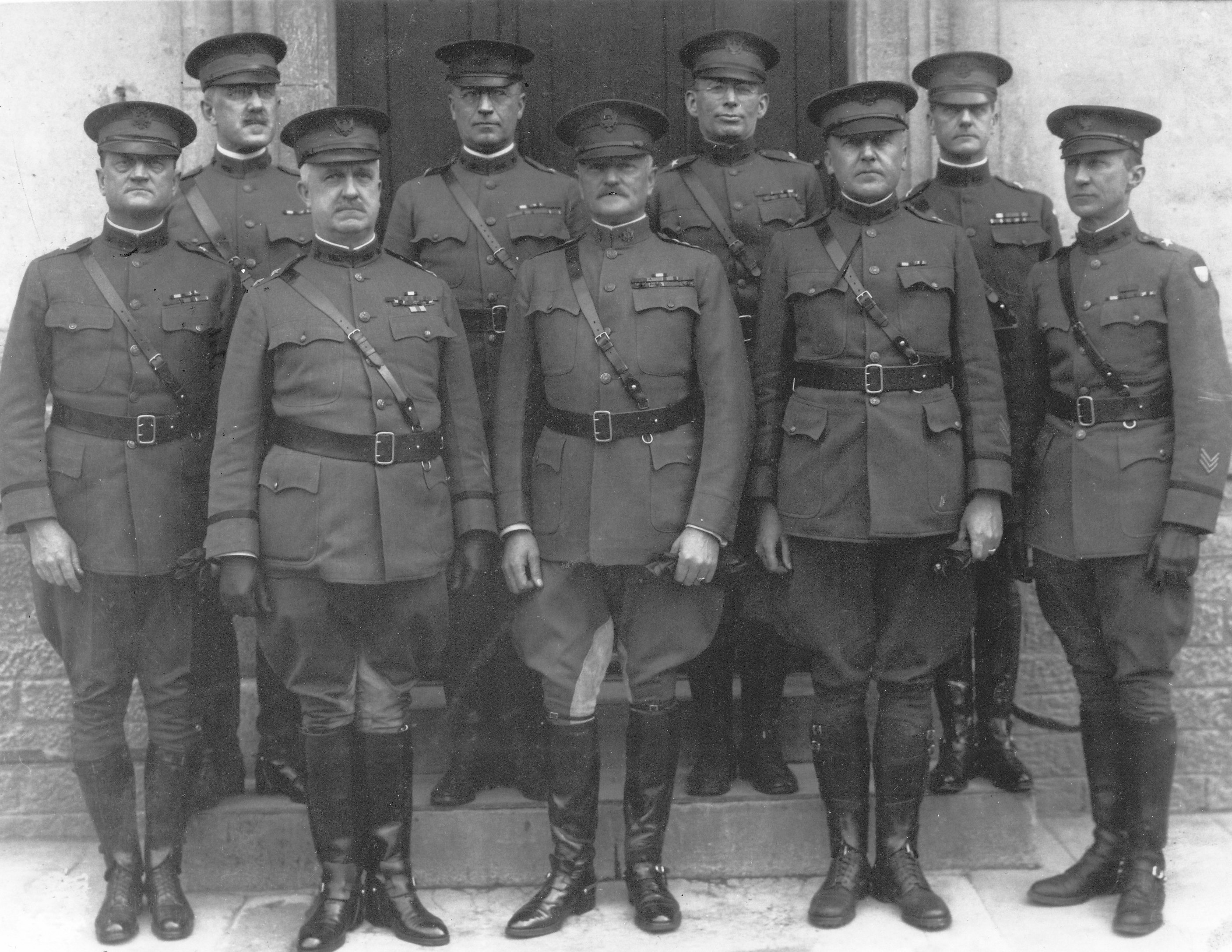
General John J. Pershing and members of his staff. Dennis E. Nolan can be seen just behind Pershing, to Pershing's left.

During World War I, Nolan organized the Intelligence Section for the American Expeditionary Forces' general headquarters. Starting in August 1920, Nolan, then a brigadier general, served for a year as the War Department Chief of Military Intelligence Division.

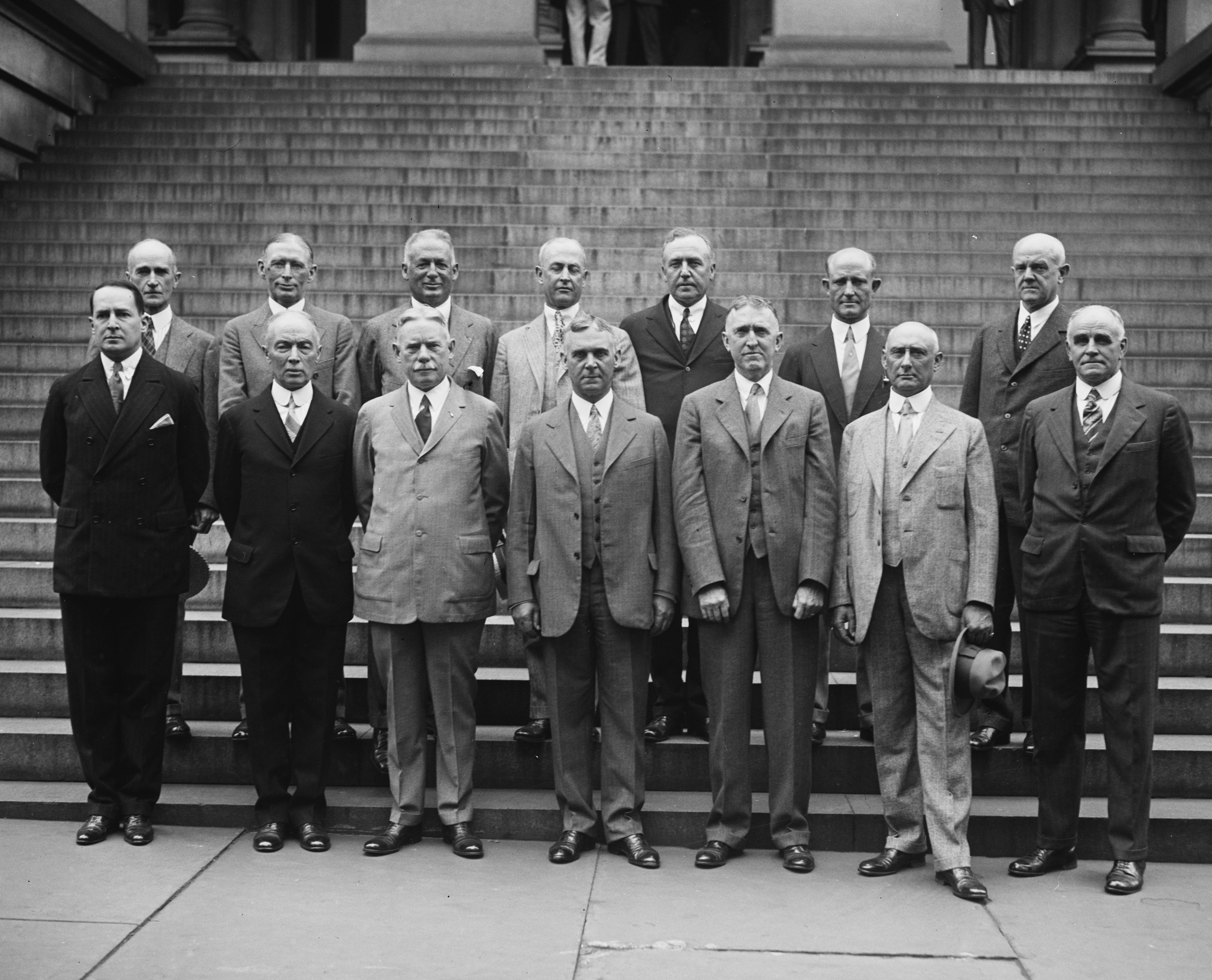
Corps area commanders and division commanders meet with the army chief of staff, Major General Charles Pelot Summerall, at the War Department, May 1927. Stood in the back row, second from the left, is Major General Dennis E. Nolan, commanding the Fifth Corps Area.

From 1927 to 1931, Nolan was commander of Fifth Corps Area, headquartered at Fort Hayes at Columbus, Ohio, one of and geographically the largest of nine corps areas established in the continental United States for the administration of the regular army and reserves by the National Defense Act of 1920. As a corps area commander, he oversaw peacetime training for Army Reserves and the National Guard. In time of war, the corps areas would theoretically have ready made corps combat command structures in place to administer regiments of Regular Army, Reserve and National Guard. During the lean post-war and Great Depression years of military spending, he as well other corps commanders were expected to maintain good relations with the public and civilian officials.

Nolan accepted his final posting as commanding general of Second Corps Area, in charge of army units and facilities in New York, New Jersey, Delaware and Puerto Rico on December 1, 1931. On October 1, 1933, First United States Army was reestablished, co-located and co-staffed with Second Corps Area at Fort Jay, Governors Island, New York. Nolan became First Army's first peacetime commander. Nolan ended his active duty army career upon retirement on April 30, 1936.

== Awards ==
Nolan received the Distinguished Service Cross, the Army Distinguished Service Medal, and two Silver Star Citations. He also received the Croix de Guerre with Palm and the Medal of Solidaridad from Panama. He was made a Companion of the Order of the Bath, a Commander of the Legion of Honour, and a Commander of the Order of the Crown, as well as appointments to the Order of the Crown of Italy and National Order of Merit of Chile.

== Personal life ==
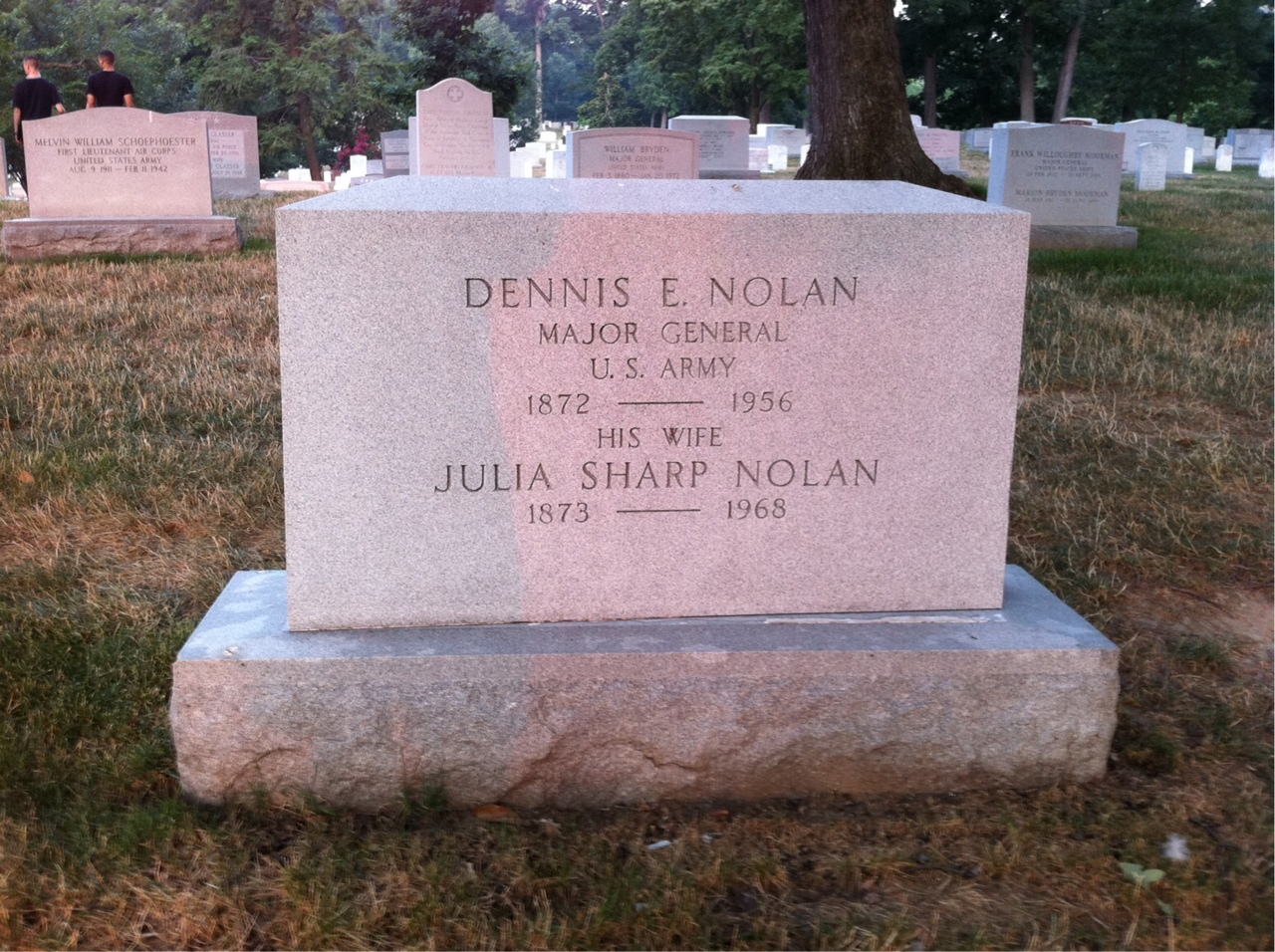
The grave of Major General Dennis E. Nolan at Arlington National Cemetery.

Nolan married Julia Grant Sharp on August 21, 1901. She was the daughter of Alexander Sharp and Ellen "Nellie" Dent. Nellie Dent Sharp was the sister of Ulysses S. Grant's wife Julia Boggs Dent. In addition to her aunt Julia, Julia Sharp's family included uncle Frederick Tracy Dent. Dennis and Julia Nolan were the parents of two children: Dennis and Ellen Honora.

Nolan died on February 24, 1956, in New York City, and was buried at Arlington National Cemetery, in Arlington, Virginia. General Nolan is a member of the Military Intelligence Hall of Fame.

== Head coaching record ==
Year	Team	Overall	Conference	Standing	Bowl/playoffs
Army Cadets (Independent) (1902)
1902	Army	6–1–1			
Army:		6–1–1			
Total:		6–1–1			

Military offices
Preceded by Newly activated organization	Commanding General First Army; 1933–1936	Succeeded by Fox Conner
