= USS General Stuart Heintzelman =

US Navy transport ship

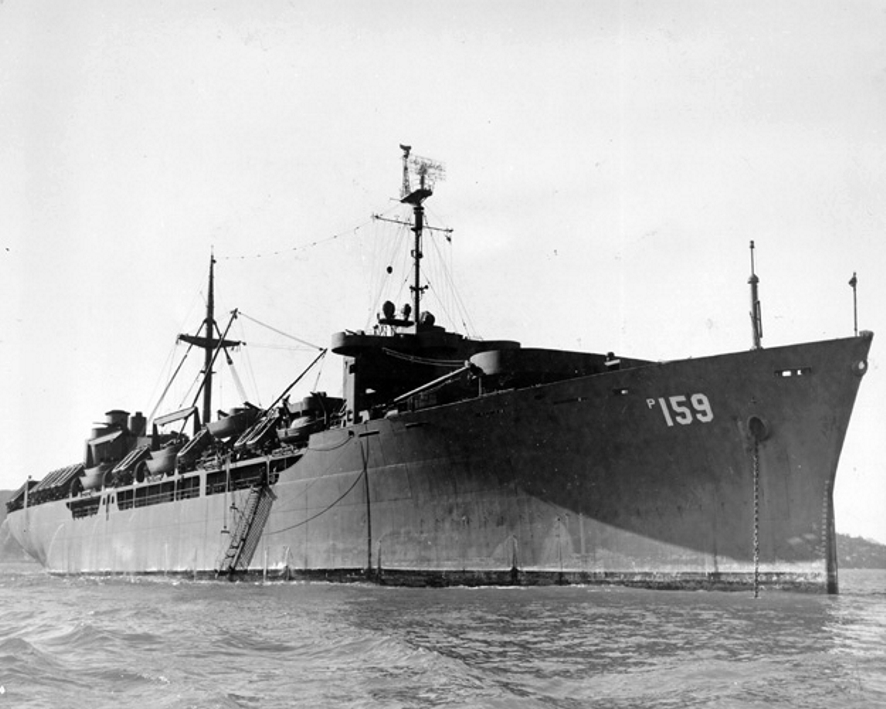
- USS General Stuart Heintzelman (AP-159) at anchor, circa in 1945

History

United States
- Name: General Stuart Heintzelman
- Namesake: Stuart Heintzelman
- Builder: Kaiser Co., Inc.; Richmond, California
- Laid down: date unknown
- Launched: 21 April 1945
- Acquired: 12 September 1945
- Commissioned: 12 September 1945
- Decommissioned: 12 June 1946
- In service: 1946 (Army); 1 March 1950 (MSTS)
- Out of service: 1 March 1950 (Army); 24 June 1954 (MSTS)
- Reclassified: T-AP-159, 1 March 1950
- Identification: IMO number: 6903187
- Fate: Scrapped 1984

General characteristics
- Class & type: General G. O. Squier-class transport ship
- Displacement: 9,950 tons (light), 17,250 tons (full)
- Length: 522 ft 10 in (159.36 m)
- Beam: 71 ft 6 in (21.79 m)
- Draft: 26 ft 6 in (8.08 m)
- Propulsion: single-screw steam turbine with 9,900 shp (7,400 kW)
- Speed: 17 knots (31 km/h)
- Capacity: 3,823 troops
- Complement: 356 (officers and enlisted)
- Armament: 4 × 5"/38 caliber gun mounts; 4 × 40 mm AA gun mounts; 16 × 20 mm AA gun mounts

USS General Stuart Heintzelman (AP-159) was a General G. O. Squier-class transport ship for the U.S. Navy in World War II. She was named in honor of U.S. Army general Stuart Heintzelman. She was transferred to the U.S. Army as USAT General Stuart Heintzelman in 1946. On 1 March 1950 she was transferred to the Military Sea Transportation Service (MSTS) as USNS General Stuart Heintzelman (T-AP-159). She was later sold for commercial operation before being scrapped in 1984.

== Operational history ==
General Stuart Heintzelman (AP-159) was launched under a Maritime Commission contract (MC #716) 21 April 1945 by Kaiser Co., Inc., Yard 3, Richmond, California; sponsored by Mrs. C. H. Wright; acquired by the Navy and simultaneously commissioned 12 September 1945.

After shakedown out of San Diego, General Stuart Heintzelman departed San Pedro, California, 9 October 1945 and carried more than 3,000 occupation troops to Yokohama. Returning to Seattle 6 November with 3,100 veteran passengers, she made a similar voyage from Seattle to Japan and back again between 13 November and 9 December. On 28 December she sailed from Seattle on another "Magic-Carpet" run to Manila and Yokohama and returned to San Francisco 3 March 1946 with a full load of homeward-bound troops. Following a round-trip voyage from San Francisco to Manila and return, General Stuart Heintzelman steamed from the West Coast via Panama to New York, where she arrived 27 May. She decommissioned there 12 June and was returned to WSA for use as an Army transport by the Army Transport Service.

On 30 October 1947 USAT General Stuart Heintzelman left Bremerhaven with 843 displaced persons from Estonia, Latvia and Lithuania and arrived in Fremantle, Western Australia on 28 November 1947. This voyage was the first of almost 150 voyages by some 40 ships bringing refugees of World War II to Australia. General Stuart Heintzelman made three more such trips herself, arriving in Melbourne with 822 refugees on 20 April 1948, in Sydney with 1301 on 24 November 1949, and in Melbourne with 1302 on 3 March 1950. She also made a trip from Germany to New York, bringing [TK] refugees and arriving on 13 January 1950. Another trip departed Bremerhaven on 17 April 1950.

General Stuart Heintzelman was reacquired by the Navy 1 March 1950 and assigned to overseas transport duty under MSTS. Crewed by civilians, she operated out of San Francisco in 1950 and into 1951 steaming to the Far East carrying combat troops in support of the Korean War. In late 1951 she steamed from San Francisco to New York for transport duty in the Atlantic and the Caribbean. For more than 2 years she made passenger runs typically from New York to Bremerhaven, Germany; La Pallice, France; Southampton, England; Argentia, Newfoundland; Reykjavík, Iceland; and San Juan, Puerto Rico. One such run in November 1951 hauled elements of the 28th Infantry Division from Hampton Roads, Virginia to Bremerhaven as an effort to bolster NATO forces in Germany.

On 24 June 1954 General Stuart Heintzelman was deactivated and assigned to the Atlantic Reserve Fleet, Orange, Texas. She was returned to the Maritime Administration in June 1960. She was berthed with the National Defense Reserve Fleet, Beaumont, Texas, before being sold for commercial use in 1968. In 1969 the ship was rebuilt as the container ship Mobile, USCG ON 513556, IMO 6903187, for Sea Land Service by Alabama Shipbuilding & Dry Dock Company of Mobile, AL. She was scrapped in Taiwan in 1984.

== Sources ==
- Cudahy, Brian J. (2006). Box Boats: How Container Ships Changed the World. Fordham University Press. ISBN 978-0-8232-2569-9.
- Williams, Greg H. (2013). World War II U.S. Navy Vessels in Private Hands. McFarland Books. ISBN 978-0-7864-6645-0.
