= 12th Field Artillery Regiment =

US military unit

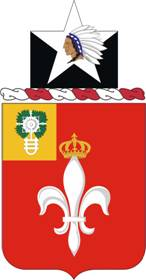
- Coat of Arms
- Active: 1916
- Country: United States
- Branch: Army
- Type: Field Artillery
- Home Station: Fort Carson, Colorado (2nd Battalion)
- Nickname: Viking
- Patron: Saint Barbara
- Motto: NEC TEMERE NEC TIMIDE (Neither Rashly nor Timidly)
- Branch Color: Scarlet
- Equipment: M777 155mm Towed Artillery

Commanders
- Notable commanders: Charles M. Bundel

Insignia
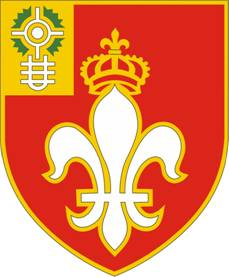
- Distinctive unit insignia

The 12th Field Artillery Regiment is a unit of the United States Army. It currently has two active battalions within the regiment's lineage (as the U.S. Army has few active/cohesive regiments, having transitioned mostly to brigade combat teams). 2nd Battalion, 12th Field Artillery Regiment (2-12 FA) is located at Fort Carson, Colorado, part of the 4th Infantry Division Artillery, while 3rd Battalion, 12th Field Artillery Regiment (3-12 FA) has been activated at Fort Drum, NY in October 2025, as part of the 10th Mountain Division but serving as the long-range precision fires arm for the 56th Theater Multi-Domain Command.

== Distinctive insignia ==
=== Description and symbolism ===
The unit's insignia is a gold color metal and enamel device 1 inch (2.54 cm) in height overall consisting of a shield blazoned: Gules, a Fleur-de-lis Argent crowned Or; on a canton of the like an Aztec banner Vert garnished of the second. The single fleur-de-lis of silver is taken from the arms of Soissons, where the regiment performed such distinguished service that it was cited by the French in Orders of the Army, shown by the pendant Croix de guerre. The regiment had its baptism of fire near Verdun, the arms of which have one fleur-de-lis crowned all gold. The crown on these arms is for Verdun. The canton carried the Aztec banner from the crest of the parent organization, the 3rd Field Artillery Regiment. The distinctive unit insignia was originally approved for the 12th Field Artillery Regiment on 17 April 1923. It was re-designated for the 12th Field Artillery Battalion on 14 February 1941. It was re-designated for the 12th Artillery Regiment on 10 February 1958. The insignia was re-designated effective 1 September 1971, for the 12th Field Artillery Regiment.

== Coat of arms ==
=== Blazon ===
The shield is a fleur-de-lis Argent crowned Or on a canton of the second and is shaped like an Aztec banner Vert. The shoulder sleeve insignia of the regiment Proper (a horizontal oblong of Black charged with the White star and Indian head of the Second Division) is on a wreath of the colors Argent and Gules.

=== Symbolism ===
The shield is the single fleur-de-lis of silver is taken from the arms of Soissons, where the regiment performed such distinguished service that it was cited by the French in Orders of the Army, shown by the pendant Croix de guerre. The regiment had its baptism of fire near Verdun, the arms of which have one fleur-de-lis crowned all gold. The crown on these arms is for Verdun. The canton carried the Aztec banner from the crest of the parent organization, the 3rd Field Artillery. The crest of the 12th Field Artillery is self-explanatory. The coat of arms was originally approved for the 12th Field Artillery Regiment on 24 June 1921. It was amended to include the motto on 16 August 1921. It was re-designated for the 12th Field Artillery Battalion on 13 February 1941. It was re-designated for the 12th Artillery Regiment on 10 February 1958. The insignia was re-designated effective 1 September 1971, for the 12th Field Artillery Regiment.

== Unit awards and decorations ==
=== 2nd Battalion ===
Ribbon	Award	Citation	Notes
U.S. Army Presidential Unit Citation	Presidential Unit Citation	"For gallantry, determination, and esprit de corps in accomplishing its mission under extremely difficult and hazardous conditions."	Awarded during service in the Korean War for actions at Hongcheon.
U.S. Army Presidential Unit Citation	Presidential Unit Citation	"For gallantry, determination, and esprit de corps in accomplishing its mission under extremely difficult and hazardous conditions."	Awarded during service in the Korean War for actions at the Battle of Chipyong-ni.
Valorous Unit Award	Valorous Unit Award	"For extraordinary heroism in action against an armed enemy of the United States of America."	Awarded during service in the Vietnam War for actions during the Cambodian Campaign - FISH HOOK.
U.S. Army Meritorious Unit Commendation	Meritorious Unit Commendation	"For exceptionally meritorious conduct in the performance of outstanding service, heroic deeds, or valorous actions."	Awarded during service in OIF (09-10) for actions in Baghdad, Iraq.
French Croix de Guerre with Palm	French Croix de Guerre with Palm	For acts of heroism involving combat with enemy forces.	Awarded during service in World War I for actions at the Second Battle of the Marne.
French Croix de Guerre with Palm	French Croix de Guerre with Palm	For acts of heroism involving combat with enemy forces.	Awarded during service in World War I for actions during the Meuse-Argonne Offensive.
Fourragère aux couleurs de la Croix de guerre 1914-1918	Fourragère	For acts of heroism involving combat with enemy forces.	Awarded during service in World War I for third awarding of French Croix de Guerre with Palm.
Belgian Fourragere 1940	Fourragère	For meritorious service during the Battle of the Ardennes.	Awarded during service in World War II for actions at ELSENBORN CREST.

== 1st Battalion ==
The 1st Battalion, 12th Field Artillery was constituted on 3 June 1916 as an element of the 2nd Division. The 12th Regiment arrived in France and fought bravely in four offenses in World War I. Following the armistice, the 12th joined the U.S. Army of Occupation, stationed in the Colenz area, then later returned to Fort Sam Houston, Texas, and inactivated. On 1 May 1939, the regiment was reactivated as a 155mm howitzer battalion. The 12th joined the armies staging in England for the invasion of France. On D-Day plus three, the 12th landed on Omaha Beach in Normandy and participated in the breakout from the beachhead. Later, the 12th was in the thick of the fighting of the Battle of the Bulge and it joined in the race across Germany and on VE Day was in Pilson, Czechoslovakia. The 12th returned to Fort Lewis, Washington where it remained until it was inactivated.

When the Korean War broke out, the 12th was reactivated and in July 1950, departed for Korea where it participated in the fighting on the Pusan Perimeter. Later it face the Red Chinese at the Chong-chon river. The unit became Battery A, 12th field Artillery Battalion, an element of the 2nd Infantry Division. A year later, the battalion endured some of the bloodiest fighting of the Korean War at T-bone Mountain, the Battle of Old Baldy, White Horse Mountain, and the Battle of Pork Chop Hill. In 1954, following the Korean Armistice Agreement, the battalion returned to Fort Lewis, Washington and then moved to Fort Benning, Georgia.

In 1965, with its Honest John Rockets and 8 inch howitzers, the 1-12th returned to Korea. On 20 February 1971, the unit inactivated at Fort Lewis, Washington, and immediately reactivated at Fort Sill, Oklahoma on 1 April 1971. The 1st Battalion, 12th Field Artillery became the world's first Lance Missile Battalion with a wartime mission to provide nuclear and non-nuclear fires.

The 1-12th began converting to the Multiple Launch Rocket System in August 1992.

During the year 2000, the Raider 1-12 FA (MLRS) conducted many battalion and battery-level FTXs and EXEVALs at Fort Sill.

1-12 FA also deployed its 0&1 to Fort Stewart, Georgia, and the NTC for a successful rotation with the 3d BCT, 3d IN Division, in April.

=== Campaigns ===
==== World War I ====
Aisne, Aisne-Marne, St. Mihiel, Meuse-Argonne, Lorraine 1918, Ile de France 1918

==== World War II ====
Normandy, Northern France, Rhineland, Ardennes-Alsace, Central Europe

==== Korean War ====
UN Defensive, UN Offensive, CCF Intervention, First UN Counteroffensive, CCF Spring Offensive, UN Summer-Fall Offensive, Second Korean Winter, Korea: Summer-Fall 1952, Third Korean Winter, Korea: Summer 1953

==== Iraq War ====
Transition of Iraq, National Resolution March 2003 - April 2005 part of initial attack on bagdad, attached to 3rd infantry division, 3 days of Mlrs steel rain....March, 2003- 2006 Operation Iraqi Freedom

== 2nd Battalion ==
First constituted 1 July 1916 in the Regular Army as Battery B, 12th Field Artillery. It was later organized 7 June 1917 at Fort Myer, Virginia, as an element of the 2nd Division (later redesignated as the 2nd Infantry Division). From here the unit was reorganized and redesignated 1 October 1940 as Battery B, 12th Field Artillery Battalion (B-12th FAB). On 15 October 1948 the unit was inactivated at Fort Lewis, Washington. On 10 November 1951 Battery B consolidated with Battery B, 503rd Field Artillery Battalion (B-503rd FAB) (active), and consolidated unit designated as Battery B, 12th Field Artillery Battalion (B-12th FAB). The unit inactivated on 20 June 1957 at Fort Lewis, Washington, and relieved from assignment to the 2nd Infantry Division; concurrently, redesignated as Headquarters and Headquarters Battery, 2nd Battalion, 12th Artillery (HHB, 2-12th Artillery). Later it redesignated on 1 May 1960 as Headquarters and Headquarters Battery, 2nd Howitzer Battalion, 12th Artillery, assigned to the 8th Infantry Division, and activated in Germany (organic elements concurrently constituted and activated). The battalion inactivated 1 April 1963 in Germany and relieved from assignment to the 8th Infantry Division. 13 September 1969 the battalion redesignated as the 2nd Battalion, 12th Artillery, and activated in Vietnam. The battalion inactivated 29 August 1971 at Fort Lewis, Washington. Three days later (1 September 1971 ) it redesignated as the 2nd Battalion, 12th Field Artillery. Activated once again on 1 April 1976 at Fort Sill, Oklahoma. The unit inactivated on 15 September 1984 at Fort Sill, Oklahoma. The unit moved overseas and activated on 16 July 1987 in Herzogenaurach, Germany as a LANCE missile Battalion but was later inactivated on 15 April 1992. The battalion once again redesignated on 1 October 2005 as the 2nd Battalion, 12th Field Artillery Regiment. The battalion was assigned on 1 June 2006 to the newly formed 4th Brigade Combat Team, 2nd Infantry Division, and activated at Fort Lewis, Washington.

=== Campaigns ===
==== World War I ====
Aisne, Aisne-Marne, St. Mihiel, Meuse-Argonne, Lorraine 1918, Ile de France 1918

==== World War II ====
Normandy, Northern France, Rhineland, Ardennes-Alsace, Central Europe

==== Korean War ====
UN Defensive, UN Offensive, CCF Intervention, First UN Counteroffensive, CCF Spring Offensive, UN Summer-Fall Offensive, Second Korean Winter, Korea: Summer-Fall 1952, Third Korean Winter, Korea: Summer 1953

==== Vietnam ====
Summer-Fall 1969, Winter-Spring 1970, Sanctuary Counteroffensive, Counteroffensive: Phase VII, Consolidation I

==== Iraq ====
Iraqi Surge, Iraqi Sovereignty, New Dawn

==== Afghanistan ====
Transition II

== 3rd Battalion ==
The 3rd Battalion, 12th Field Artillery Regiment was activated in October 2025. It is intended to bring more firepower to Europe theater. The activation of the 3rd Battalion is part of the U.S. Army expansion of long-range strike capabilities in Europe.

The 3rd Battalion’s activation is based on a 2024 decision to rotate long-range fires assets to Germany in 2026 as a precursor to the permanent basing of missile forces in Europe.

== See also ==
- Awards and decorations of the United States military
- 2nd Infantry Division (United States)
