= Leon Kromer =

United States Army general

Leon Benjamin Kromer
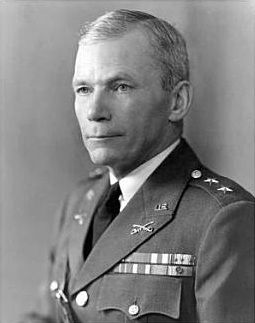
- Born: June 25, 1876; Grand Rapids, Michigan, U.S.
- Died: September 6, 1966 (aged 90); Germantown, Maryland, U.S.
- Military career
- Allegiance: United States of America
- Branch: United States Army
- Service years: 1899–1938, 1941
- Rank: Major General
- Unit: Cavalry Branch
- Commands: Chief, United States Cavalry; 11th Cavalry Regiment
- Conflicts: Philippine–American War; Pancho Villa Expedition; World War I
- Awards: Distinguished Service Medal

Leon Benjamin Kromer (June 25, 1876 – September 6, 1966) was a United States Army officer and American football coach. From 1934 to 1938, Major General Kromer was the Chief of U. S. Cavalry. He served as the head football coach at the United States Military Academy in 1901, compiling a record of 5–1–2.

== Early life, education, football coaching career ==
Kromer was born in 1876 in Grand Rapids, Michigan. Kromer graduated from West Point in February 1899 and began his service as a commissioned officer in the 10th Cavalry Regiment. In 1901, Kromer was the head coach for the Army football team, with a record of 5–2–1. The New York Times of 1930s noted that many contemporary U. S. Generals (Kromer, Malin Craig, Dennis E. Nolan, Paul Bunker) were connected by past football experience at West Point. Kromer also fenced for West Point against the Navy.

== Military career ==
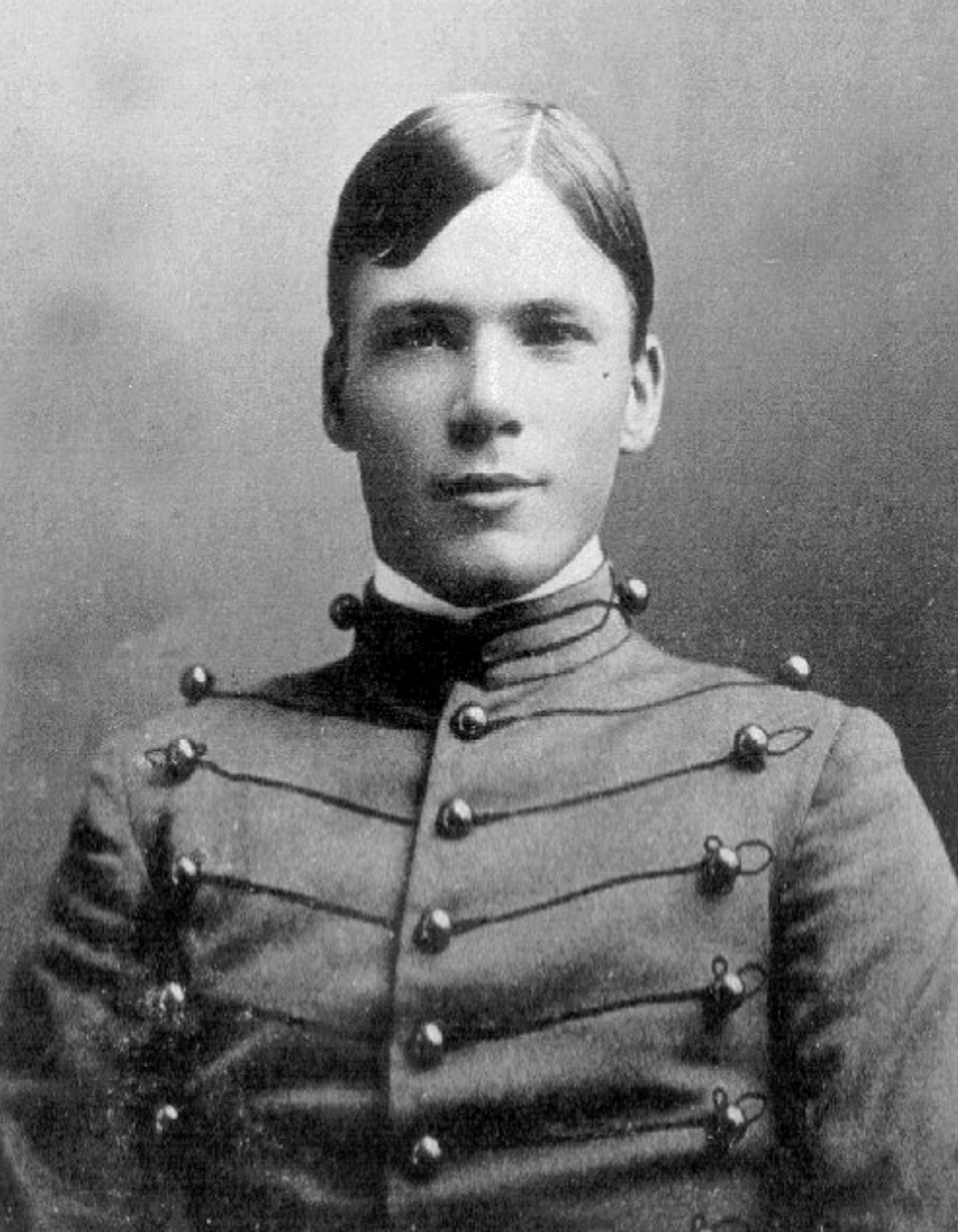
At West Point in 1899

While coaching the football team, Kromer also served in the Department of Tactics at West Point from October 1901 to January 1902. He was then sent to the Philippines until July 1903. From September 1903 to July 1905, he returned to the Military Academy as an instructor in the Department of Mathematics.

Kromer was promoted to captain in August 1905. He participated in the Pancho Villa Expedition from March 1916 to February 1917 before being promoted to major in May 1917. During World War I, Kromer received temporary promotions to lieutenant colonel in August 1917 and colonel in July 1918.

In 1918, Kromer served on the Western Front with the 82nd Division. According to his citation for the Distinguished Service Medal award, "As Assistant Chief of Staff of the 82d Division during the St. Mihiel offensive Colonel Kromer displayed military attainments of a high order in the planning of operations of great moment. Later as Assistant Chief of Staff, G-3, 1st Corps, and Assistant Chief of Staff, G-1, 1st Army, during the Meuse-Argonne operations, his initiative, sound judgment, and tireless energy solved difficult problems of traffic control and regulation, playing an important part in the successes achieved." He was also made an officer of the Legion of Honour by France and awarded the Distinguished Service Order by Great Britain.

After the war, Kromer reverted to his permanent rank of major in June 1920 before being promoted to lieutenant colonel in July 1920 and colonel in July 1921. He graduated from the United States Army War College in June 1925. After attending a cavalry course at Fort Riley, Kansas, Kromer commanded the 11th Cavalry Regiment at the Presidio of Monterey, California from September 1925 to August 1928. He then taught at the Army War College from August 1928 to September 1931 before becoming assistant commandant of the college until June 1933.

In the beginning of 1934, Kromer was appointed Chief of Cavalry and promoted to major general. His tour began with the 1934 field maneuvers involving Adna R. Chaffee, Jr.'s march from Fort Knox to Fort Riley, a demonstration of mechanized cavalry potential designed to determine how far cavalry had progressed to date. The future of cavalry was uncertain: it either remained the forward reconnaissance element of the Army, or had to develop into a completely new fighting force. Analysis of the maneuvers by Kromer's staff indicated that he seriously considered "marrying machine with the horse". He cautiously envisioned "combat cars (of mechanized cavalry) assisting the horsed cavalry in closing with the enemy."

In a foreword to the 1937 Cavalry Combat Kromer wrote that mobility was antithesis to static warfare; open flanks created by cavalry increased the magnitude of operations supported by horse troops. Only nine of 512 paged in this book were dedicated to mechanization, yet there is evidence that Kromer shared the opinion that if U. S. Cavalry did not mechanize it would disappear as a branch (which is exactly what happened under his successor, John Knowles Herr). Kromer was dissatisfied with the growing organizational rift between horse (Fort Riley) and mechanized (Fort Knox) elements of U. S. Cavalry, and redesigned the structure to close the gap. He endorsed expansion of mechanized units at Fort Knox although shortage of funds ruled out any massive changes. Kromer was an open-minded man who did not perceive mechanization as a threat to horse cavalry: "rather, he tried to adapt to a change and give each a role." By the end of his tenure Kromer embraced the modern concept of mechanized combat and, according to Robert W. Grow, "could have made cavalry the mechanized arm had he been supported by the army's General Staff and senior officers in his own branch."

== Later life ==
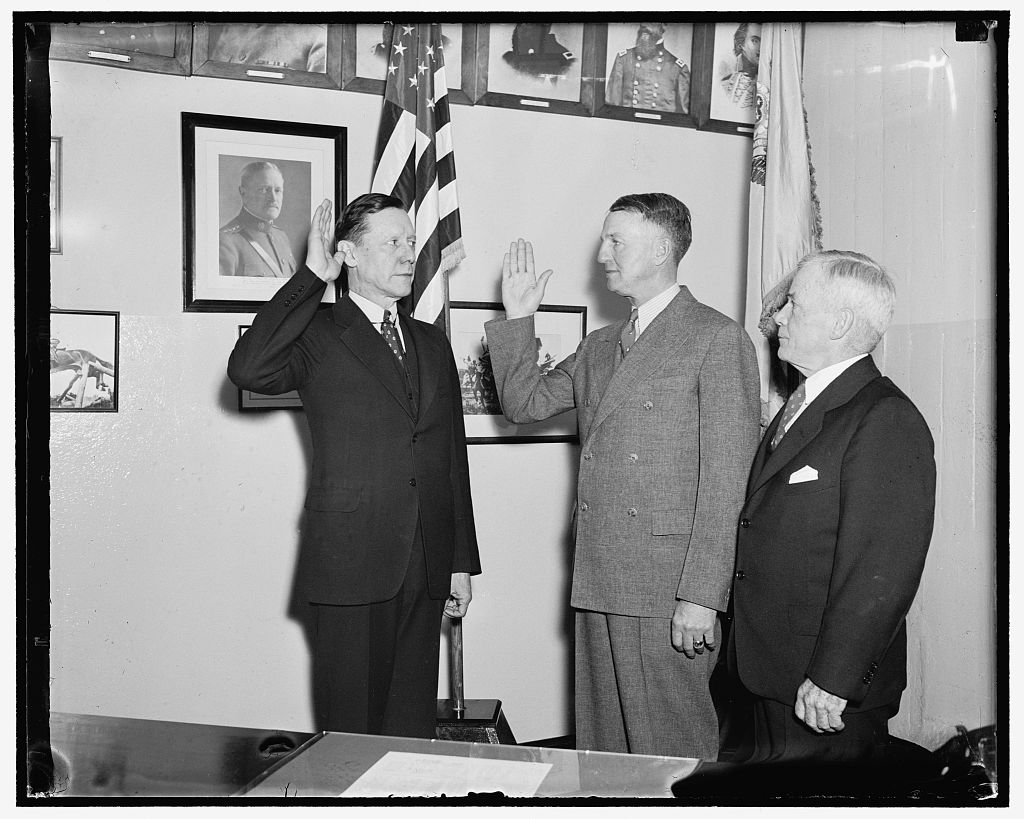
Kromer (right) handing over to Herr (center)

Kromer was replaced by John Knowles Herr in March 1938. He retired in June 1938 and settled in Northfield, Vermont. From January to September 1941, Kromer briefly returned to active duty in the Army. From 1941 to 1943, he served as commandant of cadets at Norwich University.

== Death and burial ==
Kromer died in 1966 at a nursing home in Germantown, Maryland. He was buried at West Point Cemetery in West Point, New York.

== Family ==
In 1907, Kromer married Jane Miller Stotsenburg (1888–1981). Rosetta Kromer, Kromer's oldest daughter, was a concert pianist and was married to Wade D. Killen. His oldest son, John S. Kromer, was a West Point graduate who became an Episcopal clergyman. Another son, captain William A. Kromer, became a soldier and was killed in action in Europe January 1, 1945. Another son, Leon B. Kromer Jr. (1912–1999), joined the Navy during World War II. After the war he headed industrial associations and served as labor relations advisor under presidents Kennedy, Johnson and Nixon. Daughter Jane Kromer, married Reverend C. D. Kean.

== Head coaching record ==
Year	Team	Overall	Conference	Standing	Bowl/playoffs
Army Cadets (Independent) (1901)
1901	Army	5–1–2			
Army:		5–1–2			
Total:		5–1–2			
