= Samuel Tilden Ansell =

United States Army general

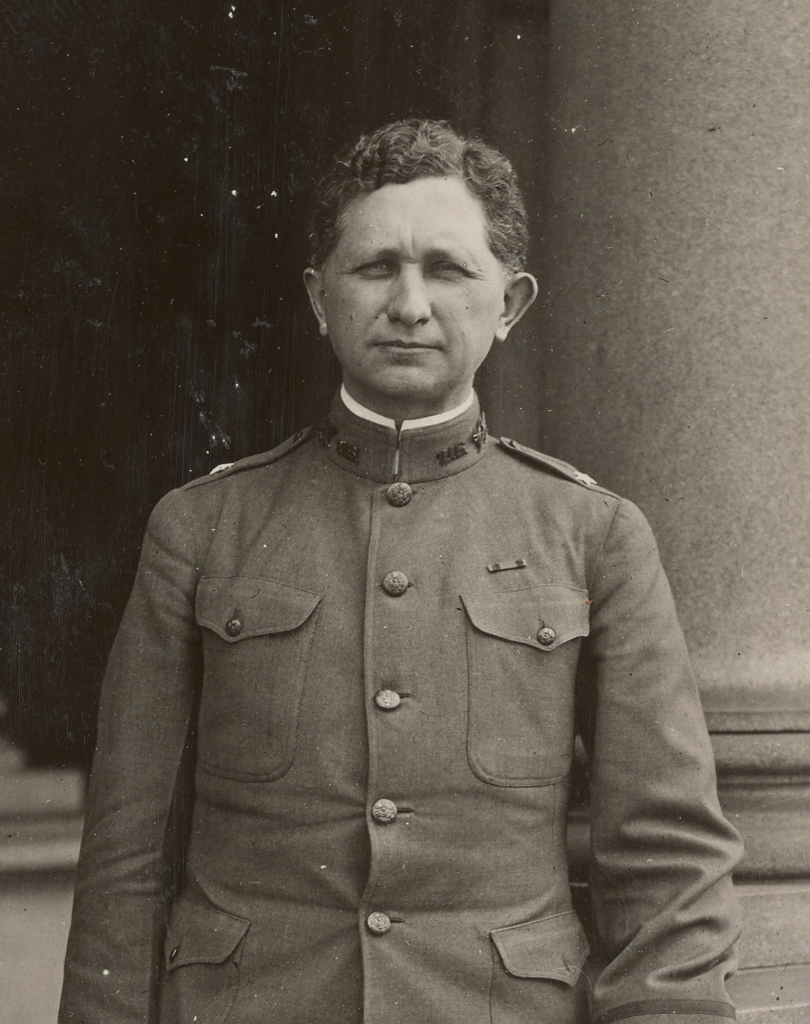
- Brigadier General Ansell, March 1918
- Born: January 1, 1875; Coinjock, North Carolina, U.S.
- Died: May 27, 1954 (aged 66); Washington, D.C., U.S.
- Military career
- Branch: United States Army
- Service years: 1899–1919
- Rank: Brigadier General
- Conflicts: World War I
- Awards: Distinguished Service Medal

Samuel Tilden Ansell (January 1, 1875 – May 27, 1954) was an American Brigadier general active during World War I.

== Early life ==
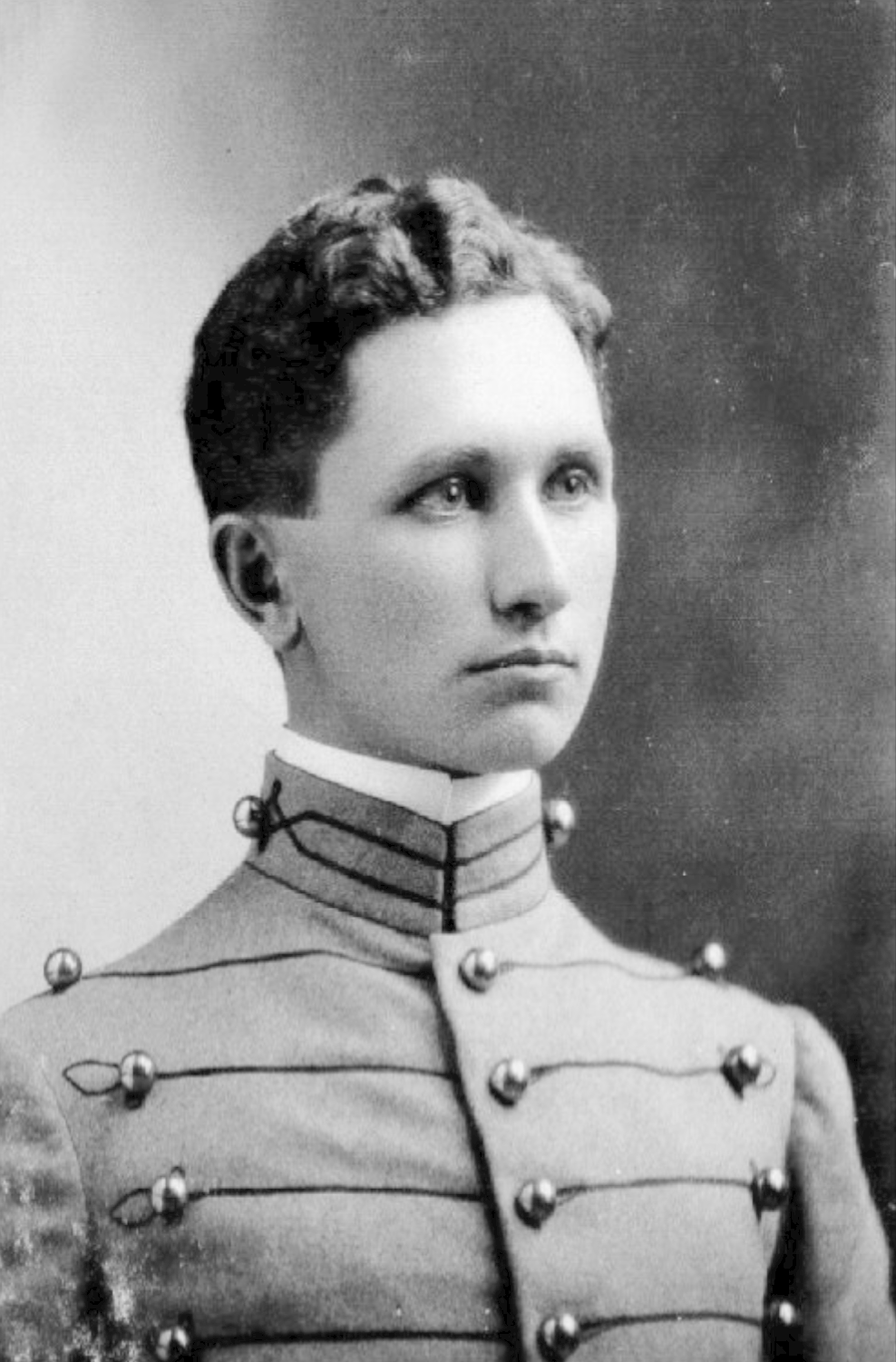
At West Point in 1899

Ansell was born in Coinjock, North Carolina. He graduated number thirty-one of seventy-two from the United States Military Academy at West Point in 1899.

== Career ==
Ansell was commissioned to the 11th Infantry Regiment and later transferred to the Judge Advocate General's Department. From 1902 to 1904 and again from 1906 to 1910, he was an instructor of law at the United States Military Academy.

He received a Bachelor of Laws from the University of North Carolina in 1904 and became a prosecuting attorney. Ansell was part of the civil government of the Philippines and during World War I he became acting Judge Advocate General of the army. He started the movement to reform the court-martial system and to rewrite the Articles of War.

Ansell was promoted to brigadier general on October 5, 1917. He resigned from the military to resume his law practice on July 21, 1919.

Some of the military justice reforms Ansell lobbied for were included in the National Defense Act of 1920.

== Awards ==
For his service as acting judge advocate, Ansell received the Army Distinguished Service Medal, the citation for which reads:

The President of the United States of America, authorized by Act of Congress, July 9, 1918, takes pleasure in presenting the Army Distinguished Service Medal to Brigadier General Samuel Tilden Ansell, United States Army, for exceptionally meritorious and distinguished services to the Government of the United States, in a duty of great responsibility during World War I, as Acting Judge Advocate General of the Army, whose broad and constructive interpretation of law and regulations have greatly facilitated the conduct of the war and military administrations.

== Death and legacy ==
Samuel Tilden Ansell contracted cancer and died at his home in the Adams Morgan section of Washington, D.C. at the age of seventy-nine on May 27, 1954. He was buried at the West Point Cemetery on June 2, 1954.
