= Stuart Heintzelman =

United States Army general (1876–1935)

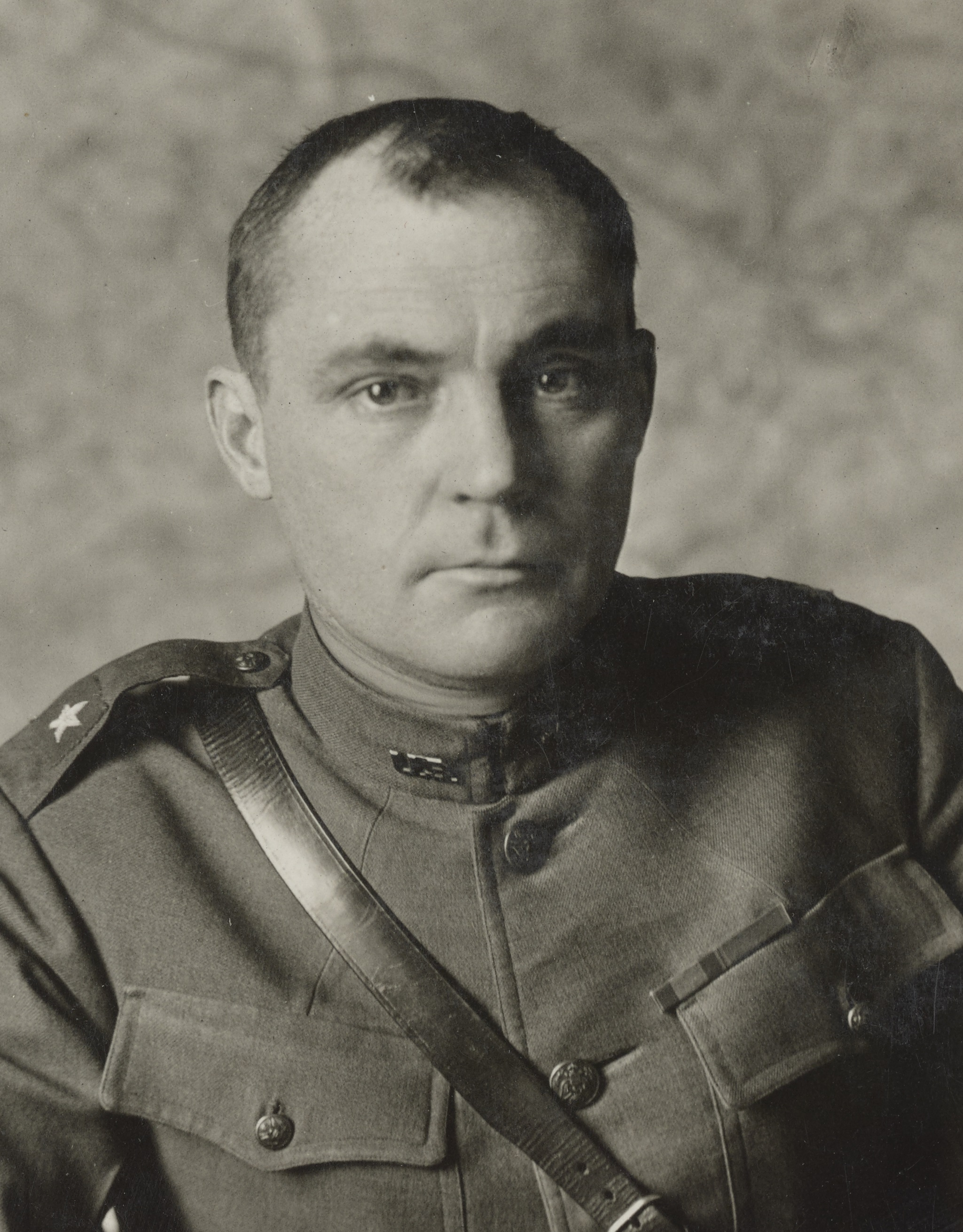
- Brigadier General Stuart Heintzelman in October 1918
- Born: 19 November 1876
- Died: 6 July 1935 (aged 58); Fort Omaha, Nebraska, U.S.
- Relatives: Samuel P. Heintzelman (grandfather)
- Military career
- Allegiance: United States of America
- Branch: United States Army
- Service years: 1899–1935
- Rank: Major General
- Service number: 0-774
- Commands: 22nd Infantry Brigade; Command and General Staff College; Seventh Corps Area
- Conflicts: Boxer Rebellion; World War I
- Awards: Distinguished Service Medal; Legion of Honor (France); Croix de Guerre (France); Order of the Crown (Italy)

Major General Stuart Heintzelman (19 November 1876 – 6 July 1935) was an American soldier. He was a grandson of Civil War general Samuel P. Heintzelman.

== Military career ==
He was commissioned as a second lieutenant of cavalry from the United States Military Academy in 1899. For the first five years of his career, he served with the 6th Cavalry in Kansas and Idaho, the 4th Cavalry in the Philippines, and as part of the international force putting down the Boxer uprising in China. In 1904, Heintzelman began what would become a long and distinguished association with Fort Leavenworth when he was selected as the Infantry and Cavalry School honor graduate. After service in the Philippines, Heintzelman returned to Fort Leavenworth as an instructor followed by another academic assignment as the Professor of Military Art and Science at Princeton University.

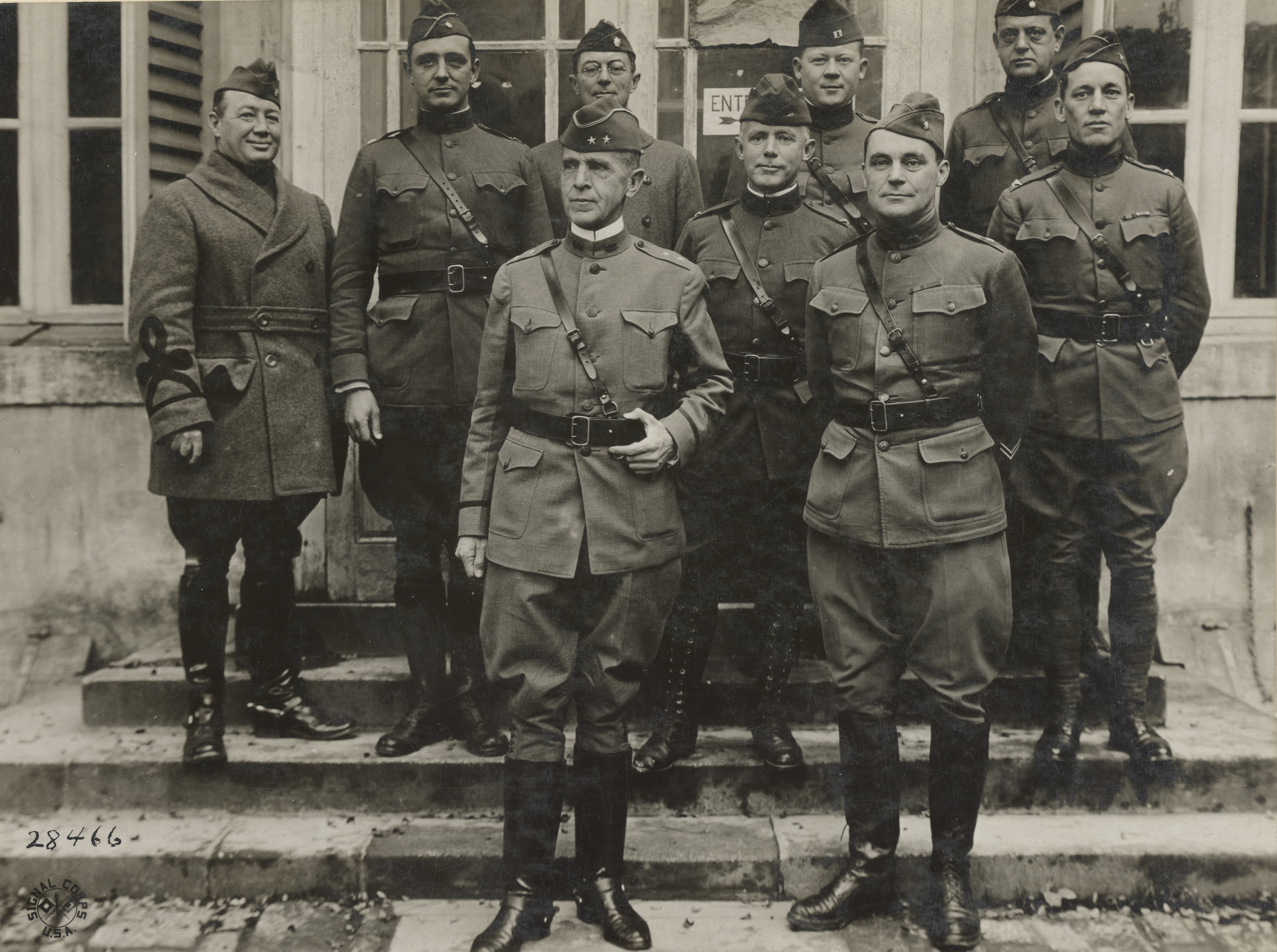
Major General Robert Lee Bullard, the newly appointed commander of the U.S. Second Army, pictured here with members of his staff at Second Army's headquarters at Toul, Meurthe-et-Moselle, France, October 20, 1918. On Bullard's left is his chief of staff, Brigadier General Stuart Heintzelman.

During World War I, as a general staff officer with the American Expeditionary Force, Heintzelman was responsible for planning the St. Mihiel Offensive. He also served with the French in the Chemin des Dames offensive in October 1917, and in winter operations in northern Italy with the French Tenth Army. He concluded his tour in France as chief of staff for both IV Corps and later Second Army.

From 1921 to 1929, he held numerous command and staff positions, including command of the 22nd Infantry Brigade, commander of the Eastern Defenses of New York, and Assistant Chief of Staff for War Plans. In 1929, he again returned to Fort Leavenworth to serve as the commandant of the Command and General Staff College and was promoted to major general in 1931. As commandant, Heintzelman was influential in updating the curriculum and actively participated in the classroom.

== Death ==
Following complications from a gall bladder operation at the Army-Navy Hospital at Hot Springs, Arkansas, Heintzelman died on July 6, 1935, at the age of 58. At the time, he was in command of the Seventh Corps Area, at Fort Omaha, Nebraska. He is buried in the Arlington National Cemetery with his wife, who had died a few months before.

== Awards ==
Heintzelman's awards include the Commander of the Legion of Honor and the Croix de Guerre with palm from France, the Commander of the Order of the Crown by the Italian Government, and the Distinguished Service Medal. He was also holder of the Philippine, China, Mexican border and Victory campaign badges.

== Legacy ==
The USS General Stuart Heintzelman (AP-159), named in his honor, was launched in April 1945.

Military offices
| Preceded by Edward Leonard King | Commandant of the Command and General Staff College; 1929–1935 | Succeeded by Herbert J. Brees |
