= Edward Murphy Markham =

United States Army general

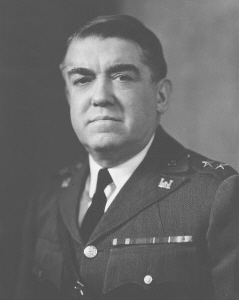
- Major General Edward Murphy Markham, Chief of Engineers 1933–1937
- Born: July 6, 1877; Troy, New York, U.S.
- Died: September 14, 1950 (aged 73); Albany, New York, U.S.
- Burial place: West Point Cemetery
- Military career
- Allegiance: United States
- Branch: United States Army
- Service years: 1899–1938
- Rank: Major General
- Commands: Commandant of the Army Engineer School; Chief of Engineers
- Conflicts: World War I: Western Front
- Other work: New York Public Works Commissioner; Business executive

Edward Markham (July 6, 1877 – September 14, 1950) was a United States Army officer who served in France during World War I and was later Chief of Engineers from 1933 to 1937.

== Biography ==
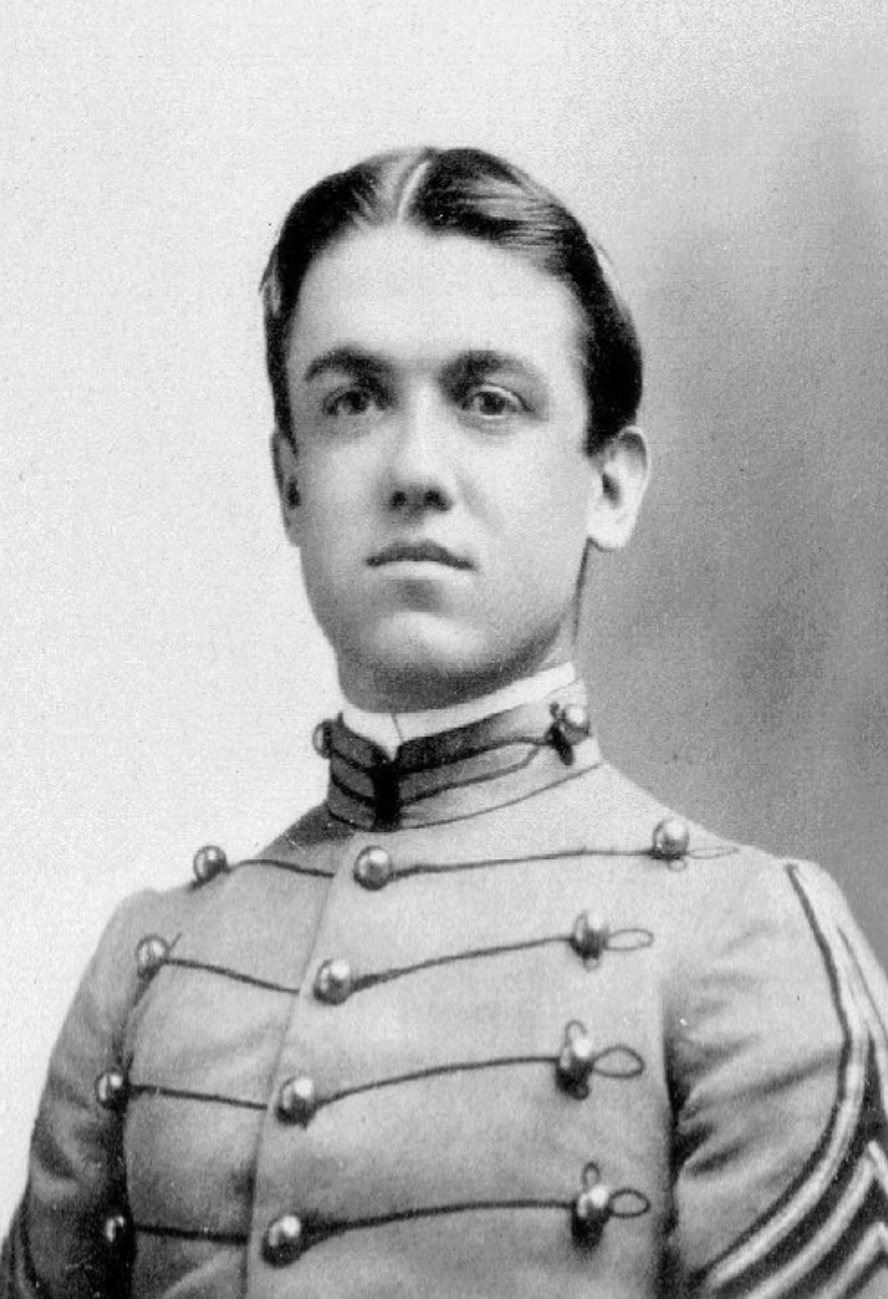
At West Point in 1899

Born July 6, 1877, in Troy, New York, Edward Markham graduated fifth in the United States Military Academy class of 1899 and was commissioned in the Corps of Engineers.

=== Military career ===
Markham served five years with the 2d Battalion of Engineers, including two years in the Philippines and eight months in Cuba, engaging in military mapping and road and bridge construction. He was Memphis District Engineer (1912–16) and Professor of Practical Military Engineering at the Military Academy. He served in France during World War I as deputy director, Division of Light Railways and Roads (1918), and in Germany as Chief Engineer, Third Army (1919). After returning to the United States, he was Detroit District Engineer (1919–25) and Commandant of the Army Engineer School, Fort Humphreys, Virginia. He then served as Great Lakes Division Engineer. After serving as Chief of Engineers, he made a special military survey in the Hawaiian Islands. General Markham retired February 28, 1938.

=== Later life ===
Markham was New York Public Works Commissioner in 1938 and President, Great Lakes Dredge & Dock Company, in Chicago from 1938 to 1945. He died at Albany Hospital on September 14, 1950.

Markham's brother, William Cornelius Markham was also an engineer. One of William's grandsons, Jeff Daly became Chief of Design for 30 years for the Metropolitan Museum of Art.

Military offices
Preceded by Lytle Brown	Chief of Engineers; 1933–1937	Succeeded by Julian Larcombe Schley
