= Charles D. Herron =

United States Army general (1877–1977)

Charles Douglas Herron
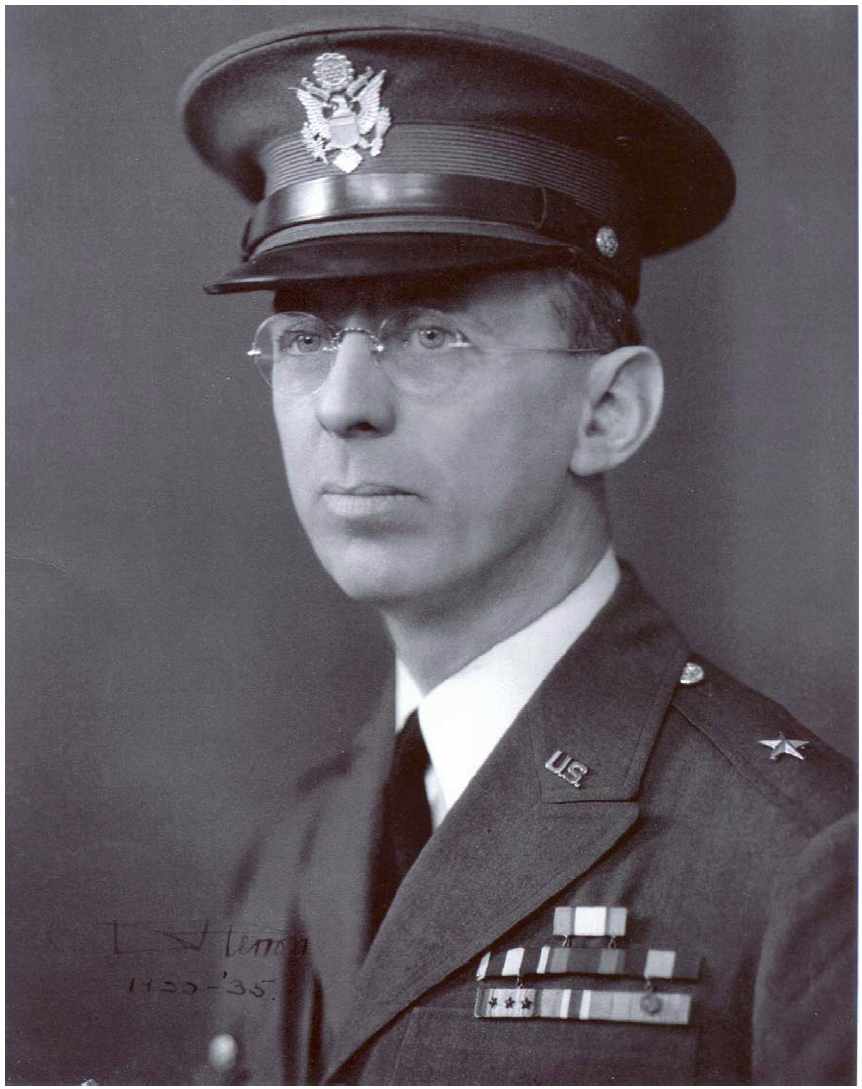
- Charles D. Herron as a brigadier general
- Born: March 13, 1877; Crawfordsville, Indiana
- Died: April 23, 1977 (aged 100); Honolulu, Hawaii
- Burial place: Oak Hill Cemetery, Crawfordsville, Indiana
- Military career
- Allegiance: United States of America
- Branch: United States Army
- Service years: 1899–1941; 1942–1946
- Rank: Lieutenant General
- Service number: 0-777
- Commands: Hawaiian Division; Hawaiian Department; VI Corps
- Conflicts: Spanish–American War; World War I World War II
- Awards: Army Distinguished Service Medal (2)

Charles Douglas Herron (March 13, 1877 – April 23, 1977) was a decorated Lieutenant General in the United States Army. A graduate of the United States Military Academy at West Point, he participated in the Spanish–American War and both World Wars.

== Early career ==
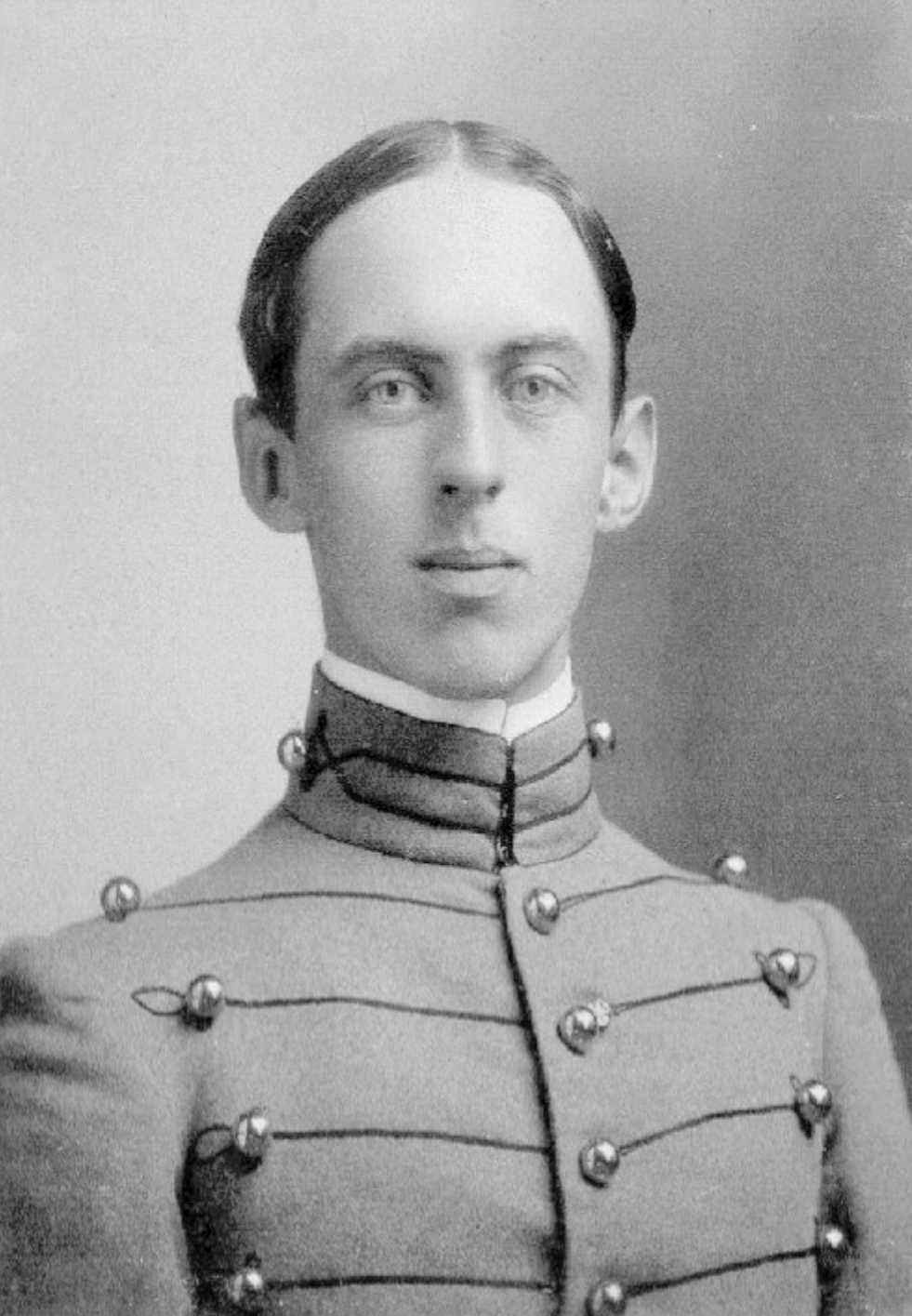
At West Point in 1899

Herron was born in Crawfordsville, Indiana, on March 13, 1877. He was the son of William Parke Herron (1843–1927), a captain in the Union Army during the Civil War.

Herron attended Indiana's Wabash College and was a member of the Beta Theta Pi fraternity before accepting appointment to the United States Military Academy at West Point, from which he graduated in 1899. Herron was appointed a Second Lieutenant of Infantry, and served in the Philippines during the Philippine Insurrection. He then carried out a series of increasingly demanding assignments, including Professor and Assistant to the Quartermaster at West Point, Instructor and Inspector of the Indiana National Guard, Adjutant of the 10th Infantry Regiment in Panama, and commander the 10th Infantry's Machine Gun Company. In 1908 he received a master's degree from Wabash College.

== World War I ==
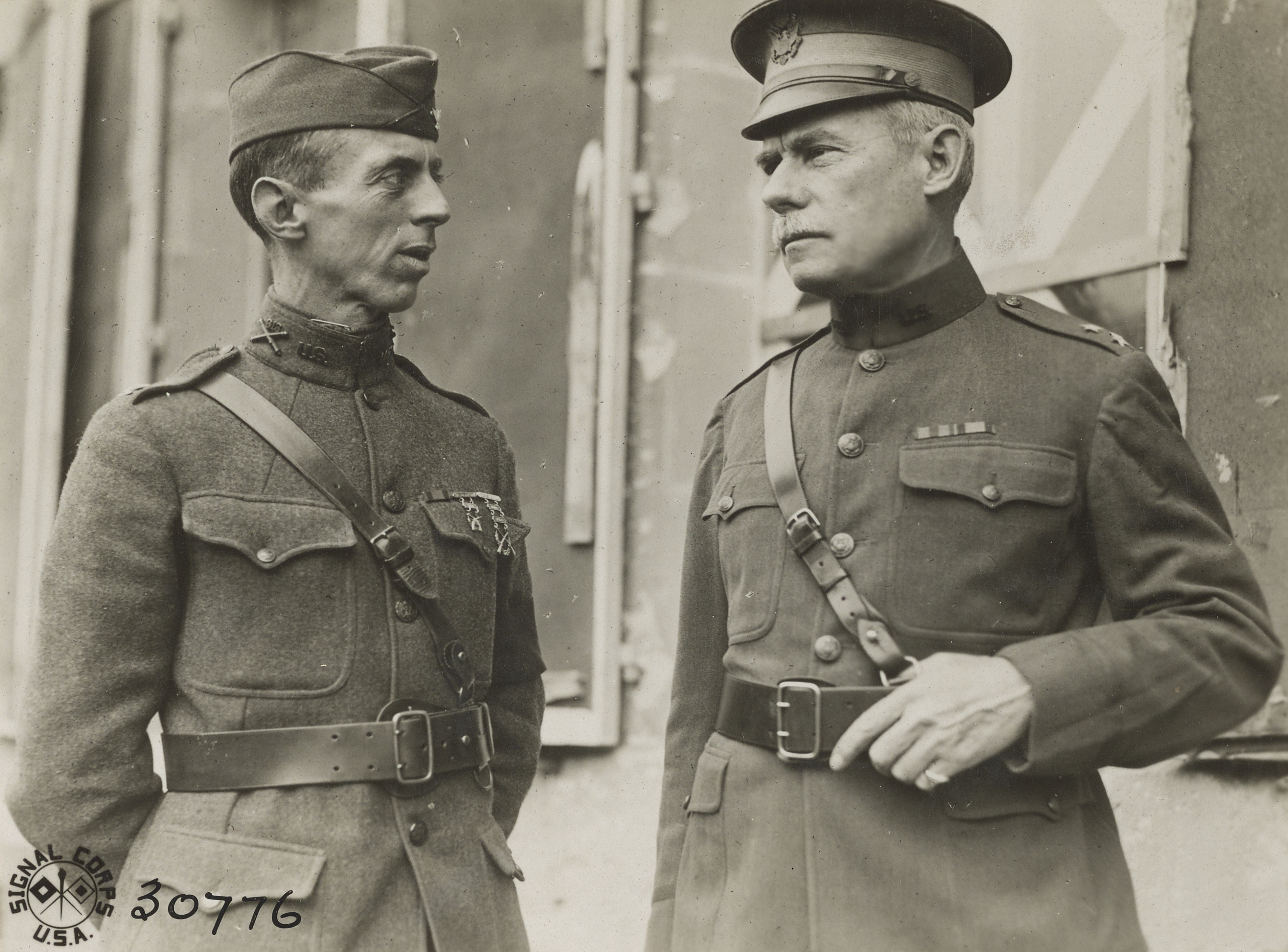
Major General James McRae, commanding the 78th Division, pictured here in conversation with the division's chief of staff, Colonel Charles D. Herron, at Chatel Chehery, Ardennes, France, October 25, 1918.

Herron as a colonel.

During World War I Herron served as deputy chief of staff of the 1st Division and chief of staff of the 78th Division, participating in the Meuse–Argonne offensive and the occupation of Saint-Mihiel. The governor of Indiana appointed him as a brigadier general in the National Guard, intending to have him command troops from that state, but Herron could not procure a discharge from the Regular Army and remained on active duty. At the end of the war his sustained superior efforts were recognized with the Army Distinguished Service Medal, the citation for which reads:

The President of the United States of America, authorized by Act of Congress, July 9, 1918, takes pleasure in presenting the Army Distinguished Service Medal to Colonel (Field Artillery) Charles Douglas Herron (ASN: 0-777), United States Army, for exceptionally meritorious and distinguished services to the Government of the United States, in a duty of great responsibility during World War I, as Chief of Staff, 78th Division, during the Meuse-Argonne offensive.

After the war he attended the Army War College, served on the General Staff in Washington, and was assigned as chief of staff of the Philippine Department, headquartered in Manila.

From 1934 to 1935 Herron was the Army's Executive for Reserve Affairs, receiving promotion to brigadier general. From 1935 to 1937 he was commander of the 6th Field Artillery Regiment. In 1937 he earned a law degree from Wabash College and was promoted to major general as acting VI Corps commander and then commander of the Hawaiian Division.

== Later career ==
As head of the Army's Hawaiian Command from 1938 to 1941, Herron was promoted to lieutenant general and bucked Army conventional wisdom by advocating for the integration of Japanese-Americans into the Organized Reserves, reasoning that their citizenship trumped their ancestry. While his stance ran counter to public opinion, he was credited with helping keep Japanese-Americans in Hawaii from being interned at the start of World War II, as happened in California and other Western states. Herron also documented his concern about the military's ability to defend Hawaii, citing its vulnerability to attack by carrier based aircraft. After the attack on Pearl Harbor, Herron provided evidence during the inquiry into the conduct of his successor, General Walter C. Short, stating that prior to Short's arrival he had provided General Short with a briefing book and other materials about the current situation in Hawaii, and that Short had acknowledged not having had time to read them before Herron departed.

Herron retired in early 1941, but was recalled in 1942, serving on the Personnel Board that considered officers for promotion. He retired again in December 1946, receiving a second Distinguished Service Medal. The medal's citation reads:

The President of the United States of America, authorized by Act of Congress July 9, 1918, takes pleasure in presenting the Army Distinguished Service Medal to Major General Charles Douglas Herron (ASN: 0-777), United States Army, for exceptionally meritorious and distinguished services to the Government of the United States, in a duty of great responsibility as Special Assistant to the Chief of Staff U.S. Army in the War Department from February 1945 to December 1946.

== Later years ==
From 1946 to 1966 Herron resided in Bethesda, Maryland, where he was active in civic affairs and served on the Montgomery County Court of Tax Appeals.

In 1966 his wife and he moved to Hawaii to live near their daughter, and Herron died on April 23, 1977, at the Honolulu nursing home where he had resided for several years. General Herron was buried in Crawfordsville's Oak Hill Cemetery.

The Charles Herron Papers (1908–1949) are part of the collections of the Wabash College Library. The Charles D. Herron Photograph Collection (1899–1941) is preserved at the U.S. Army Military History Institute at Carlisle Barracks, Pennsylvania.

== Family ==
His sister Jessie was the wife of Will H. Hays (1879–1954), Republican National Committee Chairman, U.S. Postmaster General and President of the Motion Picture Producers and Distributors of America (MPPDA), later named the Motion Picture Association of America (MPAA).

== Awards ==
- Distinguished Service Medal with oak leaf cluster
- Philippine Campaign Medal
- Mexican Border Service Medal
- World War I Victory Medal
- American Defense Service Medal
- American Campaign Medal
- World War II Victory Medal

== Dates of rank ==
Insignia	Rank	Component	Date
No insignia	Cadet	United States Military Academy	June 15, 1895
No pin insignia at the time	Second lieutenant	Regular Army	February 15, 1899
	First lieutenant	Regular Army	October 31, 1900
	Captain	Regular Army	November 2, 1906
	Major	Regular Army	July 1, 1916
	Lieutenant colonel	Regular Army	May 15, 1917
	Colonel	National Army	August 5 (accepted August 17) 1917
	Colonel	Regular Army	December 16, 1921
	Brigadier general	Regular Army	October 1, 1934
	Major general	Regular Army	March 14 (accepted May 7) 1937
	Lieutenant general	Army of the United States	July 31, 1940 – February 7, 1941
