= Edwin Burr Babbitt =

United States Army general (1862–1939)

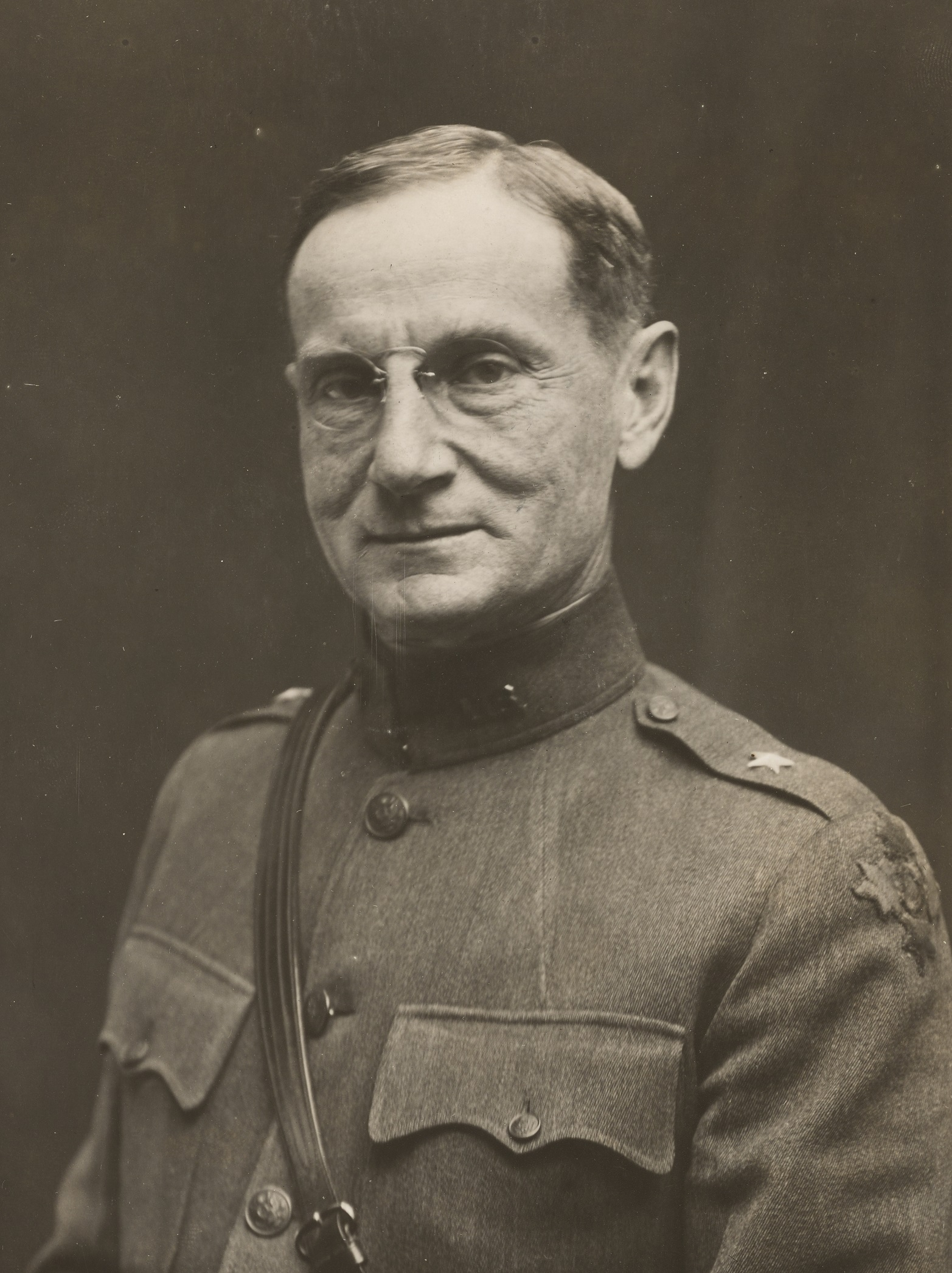
- Edwin Babbitt as a brigadier general in 1918
- Born: July 26, 1862; Watervliet Arsenal, Watervliet, New York, U.S.
- Died: December 9, 1939 (aged 77); Santa Barbara, California, U.S.
- Burial place: Arlington National Cemetery
- Education: United States Military Academy class of 1884
- Relatives: Lawrence Sprague Babbitt (father)
- Military career
- Allegiance: United States of America
- Branch: United States Army
- Service years: 1884–1924
- Rank: Major general
- Service number: 0-888
- Commands: Panama Canal Division
- Conflicts: World War I: Battle of Saint-Mihiel; Second Battle of the Marne; Meuse-Argonne Offensive
- Awards: Distinguished Service Medal

Edwin Burr Babbitt (July 26, 1862 – December 9, 1939) was a major general in the United States Army.

== Biography ==
Babbitt was born at Watervliet Arsenal in Watervliet, New York on July 26, 1862, to Lawrence Sprague Babbitt, a U.S. Army Colonel, and Francis P. "Fannie" (McDougall) Babbitt. He was the grandson of Charles McDougall and nephew of Thomas Mower McDougall.

Babbitt died on December 9, 1939, in Santa Barbara, California. He is buried at Arlington National Cemetery.

== Career ==
Babbitt graduated 19th in a class of 37 from the United States Military Academy in 1884 and was commissioned a second lieutenant. He served as a brigade commander during the Meuse-Argonne Offensive and the Battle of Saint-Mihiel during World War I. Awards he received include the Army Distinguished Service Medal for "exceptionally meritorious and conspicuous services" in World War I; Officer, Legion d'Honour (France); Comendator, Order of the Sun of Peru (Peru) and Order of Abdon Calderón, First Class (Ecuador). The citation for his Army DSM reads:

The President of the United States of America, authorized by Act of Congress, July 9, 1918, takes pleasure in presenting the Army Distinguished Service Medal to Brigadier General Edwin Burr Babbitt, United States Army, for exceptionally meritorious and distinguished services to the Government of the United States, in a duty of great responsibility during World War I. General Babbitt commanded the 4th Field Artillery Brigade from its organization to the close of hostilities, participated with marked distinction in the actions on the Vesle River and in the St. Mihiel and the Meuse-Argonne offensives. The skillful manner in which he pushed forward the artillery units in support of the Infantry was a material factor in the successes of these campaigns. In the Meuse-Argonne offensive he had under his command, in addition to the 4th Artillery Brigade, the 10th Field Artillery, the 18th Field Artillery, the 205th French R.A.C., and the 2d Battalion, 308th French R.A.C.

He retired from military service in 1924.

== Bibliography ==
- Davis, Henry Blaine Jr. (1998). Generals in Khaki. Raleigh, North Carolina: Pentland Press, Inc. pp. 16–17. ISBN 1-57197-088-6.
