= George Henry Weeks =

US Army brigadier general (1834–1905)

George H. Weeks
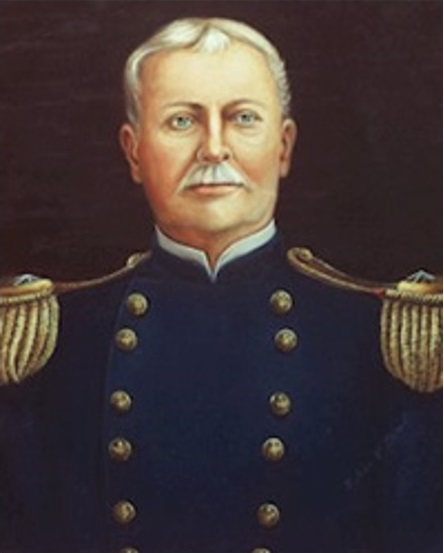
- Color portrait of Weeks as a brigadier general, c. 1898
- Born: 3 February 1834; Gilford, New Hampshire, US
- Died: 13 September 1905 (aged 71); Washington, D.C., US
- Burial place: Arlington National Cemetery
- Education: United States Military Academy
- Spouse: Laura Babbitt (m. 1859; death 1905)
- Children: 4
- Relatives: Lawrence Sprague Babbitt (brother-in-law)
- Military career
- Allegiance: United States; Union (American Civil War)
- Service: United States Army; Union Army
- Service years: 1857–1861, 1865–1898 (US Army); 1861–1865 (Union Army)
- Rank: Brigadier General
- Unit: United States Army Quartermaster Corps
- Commands: Chief Quartermaster, III Corps; Hagerstown Depot; Chief Quartermaster, Northern District of New York; Chief Commissary, Department of the Columbia; San Francisco Clothing Depot; Chief Quartermaster, District of Alaska; Chief Quartermaster, Department of Arizona; San Francisco General Depot; Chief Quartermaster, Department of California; Chief Quartermaster, Military Division of the Pacific; New York City Quartermaster Depot; Chief Quartermaster, Department of Texas; Quartermaster General of the United States Army
- Wars: American Civil War; American Indian Wars

George H. Weeks (3 February 1834 – 13 September 1905) was a career officer in the United States Army. An 1857 graduate of the United States Military Academy at West Point, he served in the American Indian Wars and American Civil War and attained the rank of brigadier general as Quartermaster General of the United States Army.

Weeks was born in Gilford, New Hampshire and raised and educated in Orono, Maine. He was appointed to West Point in 1853, graduated in 1857, and was commissioned in the Field Artillery. He served at Fort Ridgely, Minnesota from 1859 to 1861, including participation in an expedition against the Sioux along the Yellow Medicine River in 1860. During the American Civil War, Weeks served in the Union Army and transferred to the Quartermaster Corps. He performed chief quartermaster and depot commander duties in Virginia, Maryland, and New York during the war and received brevet promotions to major and lieutenant colonel to recognize the superior service he rendered during the war.

After the war, Weeks carried out chief quartermaster and depot command duties in the western United States, including postings to Washington, California, Alaska, and Arizona. In 1877, he participated in the Nez Perce War while serving as chief quartermaster at Vancouver Barracks, Washington. Later assignments included command of the quartermaster depot in New York City and chief quartermaster of the Department of Texas. In 1895, he was appointed as the army's assistant quartermaster general. In February 1897, he was selected to serve as the quartermaster general with the rank of brigadier general, and he held this position until retiring in February 1898. He lived in Washington, D.C. during his retirement, and he died in Washington on 13 September 1905. Weeks was buried at Arlington National Cemetery.

== Early life ==
George Henry Weeks was born in Gilford, New Hampshire on 3 February 1834, a son of Levi R. Weeks and Lydia (Sleeper) Weeks. He was raised and educated in Orono, Maine, and in 1853 received an appointment to the United States Military Academy (West Point) from Congressman Israel Washburn Jr. Weeks graduated in 1857 ranked 23rd of 38. Among his classmates who served on both sides in the American Civil War or became prominent in the 40 years after were Edward Porter Alexander, Henry Martyn Robert, George Crockett Strong, Haldimand S. Putnam, Charles Hale Morgan, Abram Calvin Wildrick, William Sinclair, Samuel W. Ferguson, Marcus Reno, Manning M. Kimmel, Ira W. Claflin, John S. Marmaduke, and Robert H. Anderson.

Weeks received an appointment as second lieutenant by brevet in July 1857 and was assigned to the Field Artillery School at Fort Monroe, Virginia. In February 1859, he received his commission as a second lieutenant of Field Artillery and assignment to the 4th Regiment of Artillery at Fort Ridgely, Minnesota. He remained in Minnesota until 1861 and participated in an 1860 expedition against the Sioux along the Yellow Medicine River. At the start of the American Civil War in 1861, Weeks was assigned to Union Army duty at Fort McHenry and Fort Washington, Maryland. While serving in Maryland, he was assigned as the 4th Artillery's quartermaster from August to December 1861 and adjutant from December 1861 to March 1862. Weeks was promoted to first lieutenant in May 1861 and captain in March 1862.

Following his service with the 4th Artillery Weeks began a long career in the quartermaster corps when he was assigned in March 1862 as chief quartermaster of III Corps, Army of the Potomac. He took part in the Peninsula campaign in Virginia until September, when he was appointed to command the Hagerstown Depot, which supplied the Army of the Potomac during the Maryland campaign. From January 1863 to December 1864, Weeks served as quartermaster of the Albany, New York Depot. His final assignment during the war was chief quartermaster of the Northern District of New York, where he served until July 1865. Weeks received brevet promotions to major and lieutenant colonel in 1865 to recognize the commendable service he rendered throughout the war.

=== Family ===
In 1859, Weeks married Laura Babbitt, the daughter of Brevet Brigadier General Edwin Burr Babbitt and sister of Colonel Lawrence Sprague Babbitt. They were married until her death in January 1905, and they were the parents of four children.

== Continued of career ==
Weeks acted as chief commissary officer for the Department of the Columbia from September to December 1875, then served as depot quartermaster and commissary officer at Vancouver Barracks. In December 1866, he was assigned to command the San Francisco Clothing Depot. He served as chief quartermaster for the District of Alaska from August 1867 to July 1869. After temporary duty in Washington, D.C. to settle his accounts, Weeks served as depot quartermaster in St. Louis from February 1870 to March 1872. He performed quartermaster duties in Buffalo, New York from July 1872 to March 1874, followed by quartermaster duties in Baltimore from March to August 1874. Weeks served as depot quartermaster at Vancouver Barracks from September 1874 to May 1878, which included supplying the forces of Oliver Otis Howard during the Nez Perce War of 1877. He was promoted to major in May 1876.

From June 1878 to June 1880, Weeks served as chief quartermaster of the Department of Arizona. He was depot quartermaster at Fort Leavenworth, Kansas from June 1880 to April 1882. He was then assigned as chief quartermaster of the San Francisco General Depot, where he served until October 1887. During this posting, he served concurrently as chief quartermaster of the Military Division of the Pacific from July 1883 to January 1884 and chief quartermaster of the Division of the Pacific from August to November 1883. He was chief quartermaster of the New York City Quartermaster Depot, from November 1887 to June 1888, and he continued to serve in New York City until the following December. Weeks was promoted to lieutenant colonel in October 1888.

== Later career ==
Weeks served as Chief Quartermaster of the Department of Texas from December 1888 to October 1891. From October 1891 to November 1894, he served as quartermaster of the depot in Washington, D.C. He received promotion to colonel in May 1895. He served in the office of the Quartermaster General of the United States Army from November 1894 to February 1897. In February 1897, Weeks was promoted to brigadier general and assigned as the army's quartermaster general. He served until February 1898, when he reached the mandatory retirement age of 64 and left the army.

In retirement, Weeks was a resident of Washington, D.C. He was a member of the Military Order of the Loyal Legion of the United States and traveled extensively, including a 1901 trip to Cuba and other Caribbean locations that was covered in the news. He died in Washington on 13 September 1905. Weeks was buried at Arlington National Cemetery.

== Dates of rank ==
Weeks's dates of rank were:

- Second Lieutenant (Brevet), 1 July 1857
- Second Lieutenant, 18 February 1859
- First Lieutenant, 14 May 1861
- Captain, 24 March 1862
- Major (Brevet), 13 March 1865
- Lieutenant Colonel, (Brevet), 13 March 1865
- Major, 29 May 1876
- Lieutenant Colonel, 19 October 1888
- Colonel, 16 May 1895
- Brigadier General, 16 February 1897
- Brigadier General (Retired), 3 February 1898
