= St. Joseph Roman Catholic Church (Apple Creek, Missouri) =

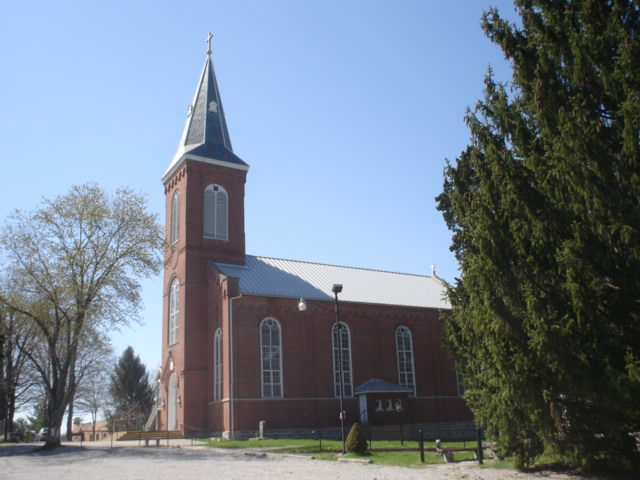

- Location within Missouri
- 37°36′46″N 89°45′30″W
- Location: 138 St. Joseph Lane; Apple Creek, Missouri
- Country: United States
- Denomination: Roman Catholic Church

History
- Founded: 1828
- Consecrated: 1884

Architecture
- Groundbreaking: 1881
- Completed: 1884

Administration
- Archdiocese: Archdiocese of St. Louis
- Deanery: Ste. Genevieve

Clergy
- Archbishop: Most Rev. Mitchell Rozanski

St. Joseph Church is a parish of the Roman Catholic Church in Apple Creek, Missouri, in the Deanery of Ste. Genevieve of the Archdiocese of St. Louis.

== History ==
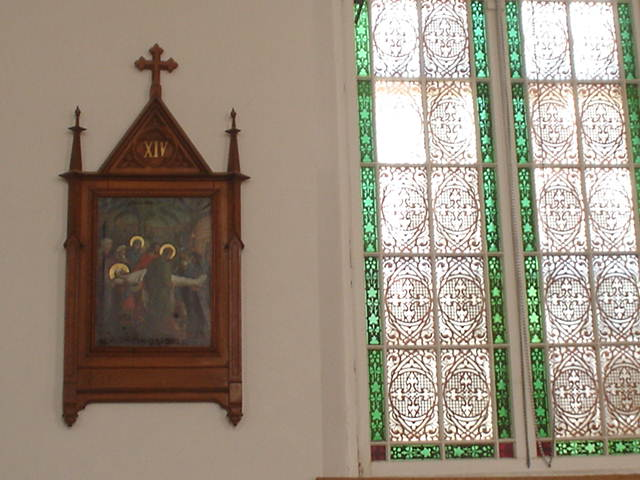
Jesus is Laid in the Tomb, the XIV Station of the Cross, inside the church's nave.

Catholic German immigrants from the region of Baden settled in Perry County, Missouri in the 1820s. W. Joseph Schnurbusch was a leader in building the first church, constructed of logs. The log church, completed in 1828, was dedicated to his namesake, Saint Joseph. Twelve years later, a second church, called the Rock Church, was constructed 600 feet north of the present church.

In 1881, the cornerstone for the present church was laid, and in 1884 construction was completed. The pastor, Rev. Francis Krieger oversaw the construction of the church as well as the construction of the rectory in 1904 and the convent in 1917. An organ, three bells – named Joseph, Cecelia, and Elizabeth – and stained glass windows were added over the years. The church was renovated in 1998; this included the installation of a new marble sanctuary.

== Shrine ==
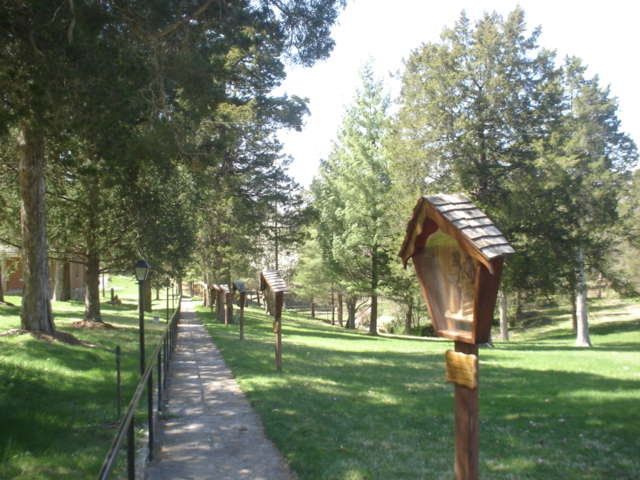
Way of the Cross

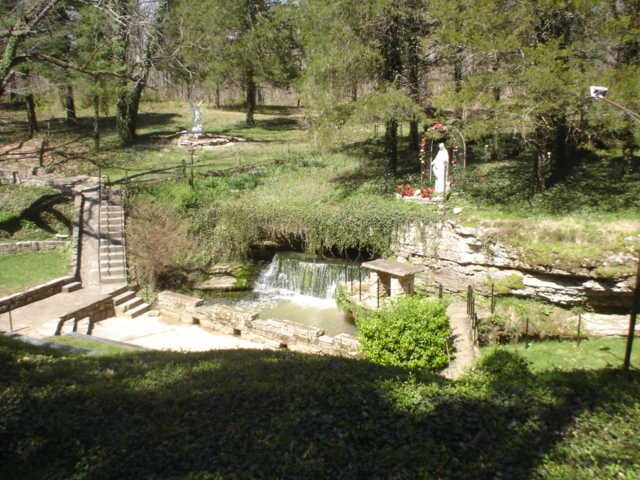
Shrine

Next to the church is a shrine built into a Karst Window, known as the Schnurbusch Karst Window, allowing the view of an underground spring. This Karst Window is the result of the collapse of a cave roof, allowing the view of a small portion of a hidden underground stream. Karst topography is common in Perry County, Missouri, which is known to have at least 650 caves.

In 1857, Rev. Joseph Becker installed stone steps to the cave spring so drinking water could be carried to the rectory via buckets and neck yoke. Later, a water line was laid so water could be pumped to the rectory. In 1883, Rev. Francis Krieger had a dam built and installed a hydraulic ram, which brought the water to the rectory by its own power. This provided the water supply until 1927 when the present deep well was drilled.

In the 1950s, Father Michell Deck began development of the Shrine, which was further expanded by Father George Schrammel. Most of the stonework was laid by local Parishioners who used the foundations of old farm homes and barns in the community. The outdoor Way of the Cross or Via Doloroso along with a rosary laid out in the stepping stones were added in the late 1990s by Father Mark Bozada.

The Via Doloroso leads down a steep path to the bottom of the sinkhole containing the Schnurbusch Karst Window. The shrine features a statue of the Blessed Virgin Mary as Our Lady of Grace, a small altar for Masses, and amphitheater. A small waterfall flows out of the cave, and its water flows before the altar, under the stone bridge, and back into the cave.

== Parish ==
The parish is home to 250 families.

== Picnic ==
An annual church picnic is held on the Labor Day weekend.

== Gallery ==
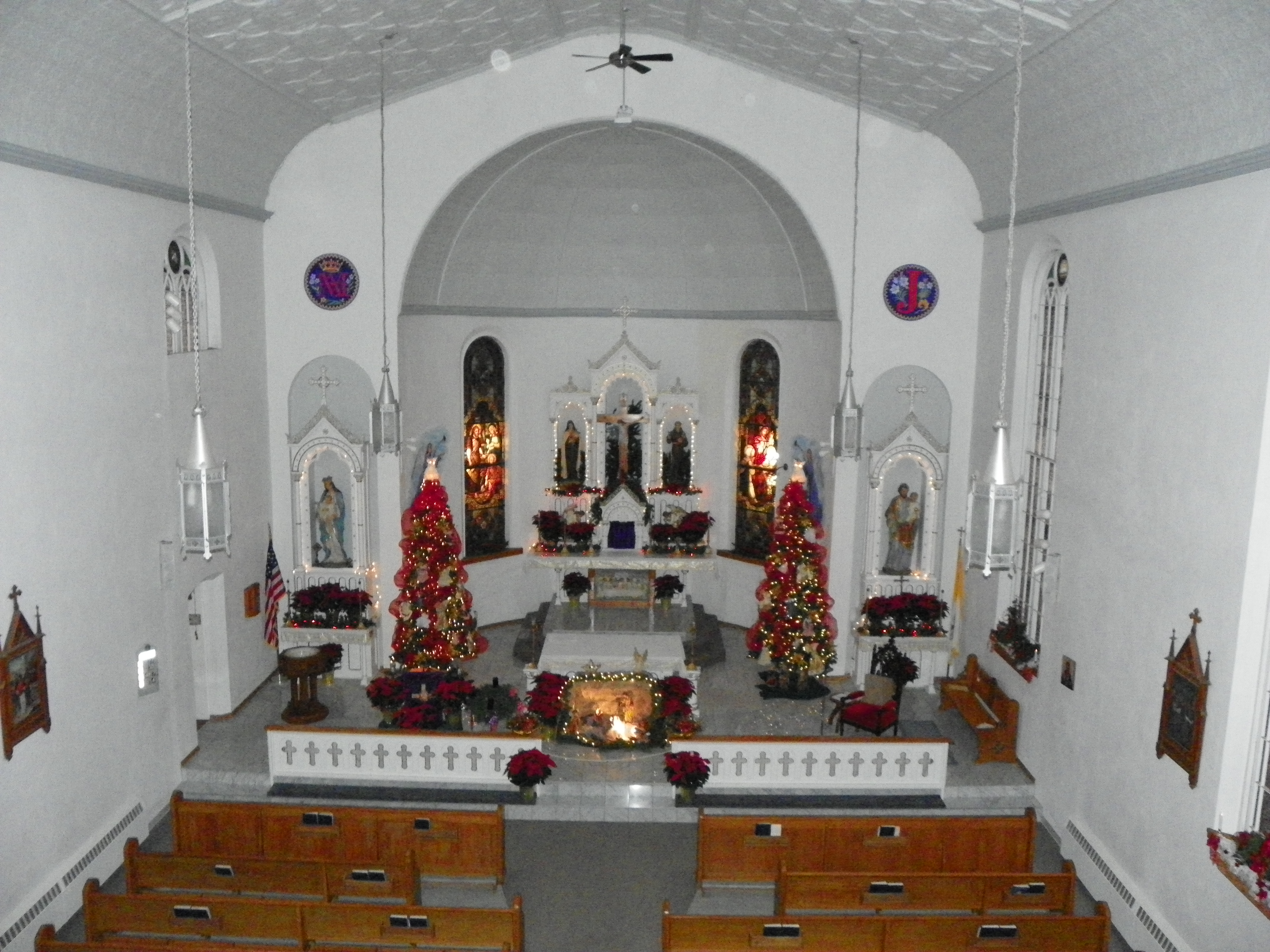
At Christmas

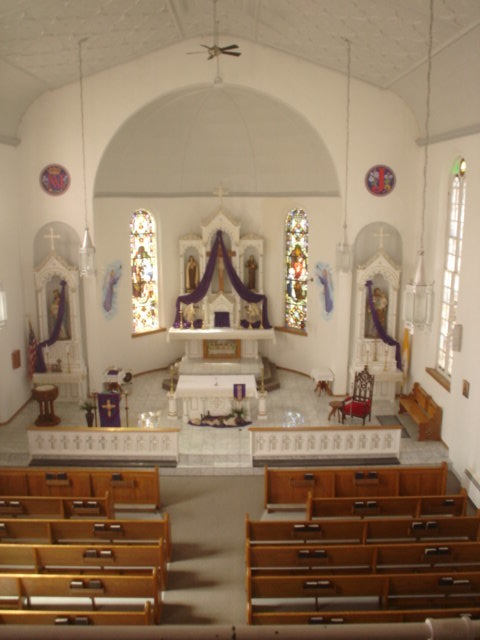
At Easter

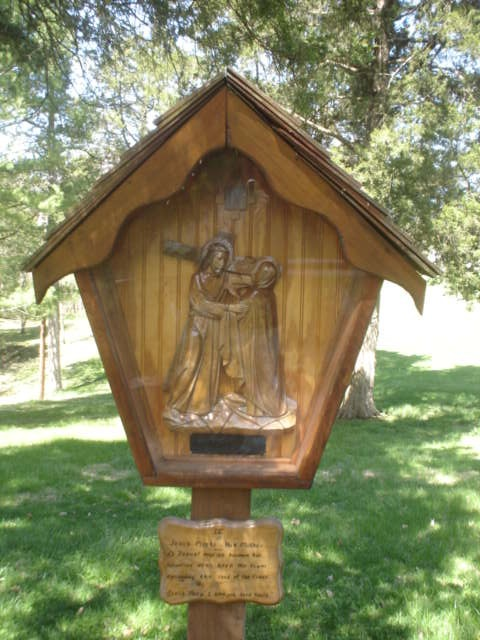
Via Doloroso

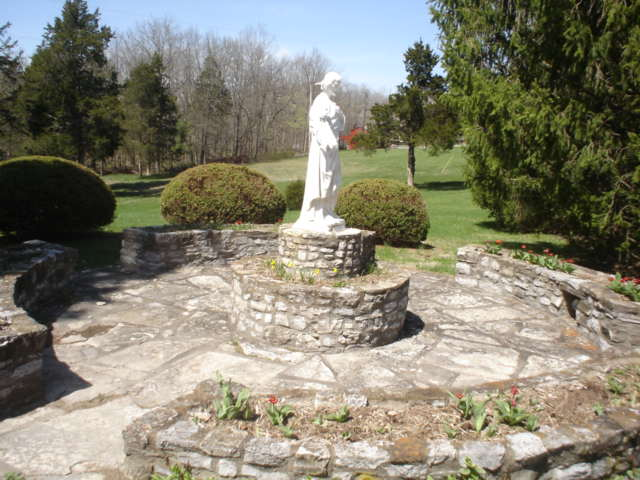
Statue

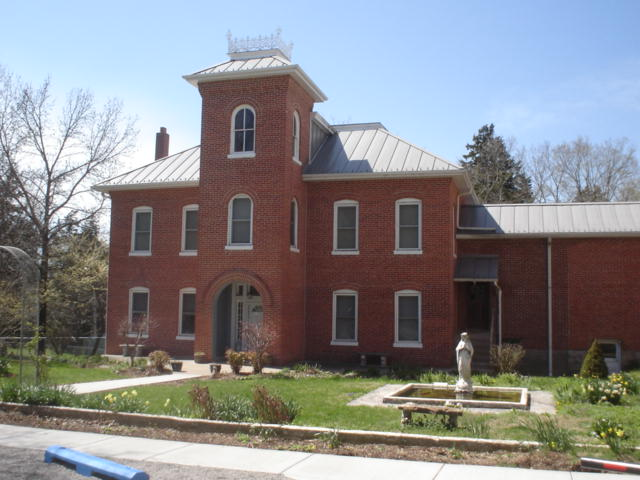
Rectory
