= James M. J. Sanno =

U.S. Army brigadier general (1840–1907)

James Madison Johnston Sanno
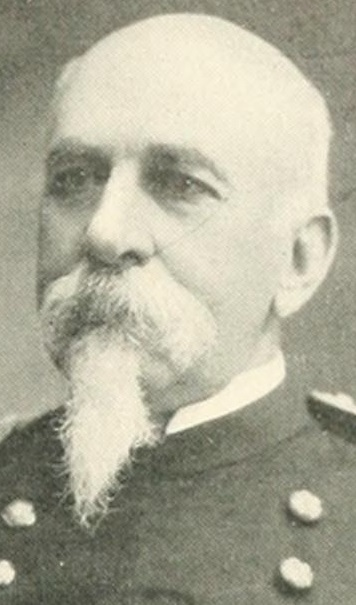
- From 1899's A Military Album Containing Over One Thousand Portraits of Commissioned Officers Who Served in the Spanish–American War
- Born: James Madison Sanno; December 10, 1840; New Hampton, New Jersey
- Died: May 4, 1907 (aged 66); Fort Oglethorpe, Georgia
- Burial place: Arlington National Cemetery
- Spouse: Mary T. Sprague (m. 1868-1907, his death)
- Children: 4
- Relatives: James Joseph Hornbrook (son-in-law)
- Military career
- Allegiance: United States
- Service: Union Army; United States Army
- Service years: 1863-1866 (Union Army); 1866-1903 (U.S. Army)
- Rank: Brigadier General
- Unit: U.S. Army Infantry Branch
- Commands: Company K, 7th Infantry Regiment; Department of Law, U.S. Army Infantry and Cavalry School; 2nd Battalion, 3rd Infantry Regiment; 4th Infantry Regiment; 2nd Brigade, 1st Division, Eighth Army Corps; 18th Infantry Regiment; 27th Infantry Regiment; Department of Colorado
- Conflicts: American Civil War; American Indian Wars; Spanish–American War; Philippine–American War

James M. J. Sanno (December 10, 1840 - May 4, 1907) was a career officer in the United States Army. A veteran of the American Civil War, American Indian Wars, Spanish–American War, Philippine–American War, he attained the rank of brigadier general, and was best known for his command of the: 4th Infantry Regiment; 2nd Brigade, 1st Division, Eighth Army Corps; 18th Infantry Regiment; 27th Infantry Regiment; and Department of Colorado. On July 30, 1903, Sanno was promoted to brigadier general in recognition of his long career of superior service, and he retired on July 31. Sanno died at Fort Oglethorpe, Georgia, on May 4, 1907. He was buried at Arlington National Cemetery.

== Early life ==
James Madison Sanno was born in New Hampton, New Jersey, on December 10, 1840, the son of William P. Sanno and Hannah (Zeller) Sanno. He was raised and educated in New Hampton. Sanno's father served in appointive offices including town postmaster and sergeant-at-arms of the New Jersey General Assembly. While serving as sergeant-at-arms in 1856, William Sanno appointed James Sanno as his deputy.

In 1859, Sanno was appointed to the United States Military Academy. He graduated in 1863 ranked 24th of 25. On June 11, 1863, he was commissioned a second lieutenant in the 7th Infantry Regiment. Shortly after graduation, Sanno added the second middle name Johnston.

== Start of career ==
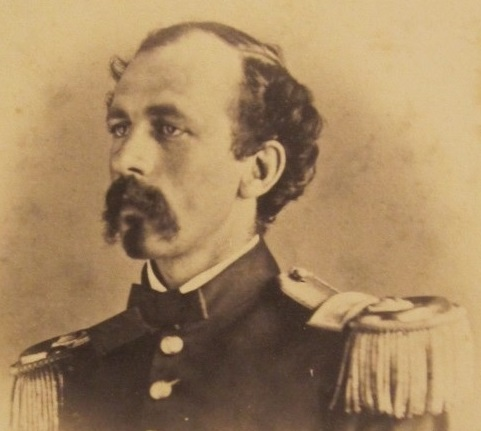
Sanno as a first lieutenant in the 7th Infantry, circa 1865

Sanno served with the 7th Infantry as part of the Union Army during the American Civil War. Shortly after the July 1863 Battle of Gettysburg, the 7th Infantry was ordered to New York City to take part in the response to the draft riots. Sanno was promoted to first lieutenant in December 1863. The regiment remained in the city through the end of the war in May 1865, then deployed to Florida for post-war occupation duty during the Reconstruction era.

From September 1864 to May 1869, Sanno served as regimental adjutant. In July 1866, he was offered promotion to captain in the 28th Infantry, which he declined in order to remain with the 7th Infantry. He served as acting assistant adjutant of the District of East Florida from November 1865 to December 1866. Sanno was inspector general for the Freedmen's Bureau in Florida from September 1867 to June 1868. He was assistant adjutant and inspector general for the District of Florida from September 1868 to March 1869.

== Continued career ==
Sanno served on frontier duty at Fort Fred Steele, Wyoming, as the 7th Infantry's adjutant from June to September 1869. He continued to serve as the 7th Infantry's adjutant at Camp Douglas, Utah, from September 1869 to June 1870. From June to November 1870 he was on temporary duty at Fort Shaw, Montana, as acting assistant adjutant of the District of Montana, and he performed temporary duty at the United States Department of War from January 21 to March 1871. In May 1871, Sanno was promoted to captain.

From June to October 1871, Sanno was again assigned as acting assistant adjutant of the District of Montana. He served with the 7th Infantry at Fort Shaw until July 1878, including command of the regiment's Company K. He took part in the Yellowstone expedition from March to October 1876, and he led his company during the Battle of the Little Bighorn. Sanno also took part in the Nez Perce War from July to August 1877, including the Battle of the Big Hole in Montana on August 9 and 10. He continued to serve with the 7th Infantry through the summer of 1878, including a regimental encampment on the Marias River in Montana from July to August 1878.

Sanno served at Davids Island, New York, as acting assistant adjutant of the army's General Recruiting Service from November 1878 to October 1880. From October 1880 to November 1881, Sanno served on the headquarters staff of the Military Division of the Atlantic. From November 1881 to November 1882 he was on frontier duty with the 7th Infantry at Fort Snelling, Minnesota. He served at Fort Laramie, Wyoming, from November 1882 to October 1886, and at Fort McKinney, Wyoming, from October 1886 to June 1888.

In July 1888, Sanno traveled to Washington Barracks in Washington, D.C., to serve as a witness at a court-martial, and he remained in Washington on temporary recruiting duty through August 1888. He then returned to duty with the 7th Infantry at Fort McKinney until July 1889. From August 1889 to October 1894, Sanno served at Fort Leavenworth, Kansas, as instructor in charge of the Department of Law at the Infantry and Cavalry School. From December 1890 to February 1892, Sanno served in South Dakota as commander of a battalion during expeditions against the Sioux, and was in charge Sitting Bull's band following their surrender. From July to August 1894, he commanded a battalion in Chicago during the Pullman Strike. Sanno served with the 7th Infantry at Fort Logan, Colorado, from November 1894 to June 1895. In May 1895, he was promoted to permanent major in the 3rd Infantry and assigned as commander of the regiment's 2nd Battalion.

Sanno served with the 3rd Infantry at Fort Snelling, Minnesota from July 1895 to April 1898, including detached service from June to August 1896, when he took part in the deportation of Cree Indians from Montana to their reservation in Canada. In April 1897, he took part in relief efforts following flooding along the Red River of the North in Minnesota and North Dakota.

== Later career ==
Sanno took part in the Spanish–American War as acting inspector general of the Department of the Missouri from April 20, 1898, to June 30, 1898, and acting inspector general of the Department of Dakota and the Department of the Lakes from July to December 1898. He was promoted to lieutenant colonel in the 4th Infantry in August 1898.

During the Philippine–American War, Sanno commanded the 4th Infantry in the Philippines. From June to July 1899, he commanded 2nd Brigade, 1st Division, Eighth Army Corps at Las Piñas. During his Philippines service, Sanno took part in engagements against Filipino insurgents at La Loma Church on March 24, 1899, near Taytay on June 3 and 4, 1899, and near Dasmariñas on June 19 and 20. Sanno was on sick leave in Japan from July to November 1899, and in Manila from November 1899 to January 1900. He was promoted to colonel in the 18th Infantry in December 1899.

After being assigned to command the 18th Infantry, Sanno served from January to August 1900 as a member of the army board in Manila that audited wartime claims against the United States. After returning to the United States and going on sick leave in late 1900, he was on duty at Plattsburg Barracks, New York, from February to August 1901 as commander of the 27th Infantry. He commanded the regiment until July 1903, including service at Fort D. A. Russell, Wyoming and at Camp Bumpus, Philippines. In November and December 1901 and March to April 1902, Sanno was commander of the Department of Colorado. Sanno requested retirement in July 1903. He was promoted to brigadier general on July 30, 1903, in recognition of his 40 years of service, and he retired on July 31.

== Commendations ==
In 1877, Sanno was commended by 7th Infantry commander John Gibbon in Gibbon's report of the Nez Perce War, and Gibbon also recommended Sanno for the Medal of Honor. In 1890, he received a promotion to major by brevet in recognition of his heroism at the Battle of Big Hole. In 1896, he was commended by Governor Benjamin F. Potts of Montana Territory and Department of the Platte commander John R. Brooke for his efforts during the deportation of Cree. In 1899, he was recommended for brevet promotion to colonel by Henry Ware Lawton, the commander of the 1st Division in the Philippines. Loyd Wheaton, commander of an expedition in Cavite during the war in the Philippines, commended Sanno in his official report of the expedition.

== Retirement and death ==
Sanno was an active member of the Freemasons and attained the 33rd degree of the Scottish Rite. He was a member of General Society of the War of 1812, Society of the Army of the Potomac, Military Order of the Loyal Legion of the United States, Military Order of Foreign Wars, and United Spanish War Veterans.

In retirement, Sanno resided with his daughter Katherine and her husband at Fort Leavenworth, Kansas. He died of stomach cancer on May 4, 1907, while visiting his daughter Mary and her husband at Fort Oglethorpe, Georgia. Sanno was buried at Arlington National Cemetery.

== Family ==
In June 1868, Sanno married Mary T. Sprague. She was the daughter of Brevet Brigadier General John T. Sprague, who was Sanno's superior officer as commander of the 7th Infantry Regiment. Her grandfather was Brevet Major General William J. Worth. Her sister Sarah was the wife of Brigadier General Henry W. Hubbell. Her sister Josie was the wife of Brigadier General Alexander Lucian Dade. The Sannos were the parents of four children: Genevieve, Mary, Katherine, and William Worth.

Genevieve Sanno was the wife of Montgomery Waddell. Waddell was a consulting engineer who was a member of the Edison Pioneers and the inventor of a synthetic silk that preceded the development of Rayon.

Mary Sanno was the wife of Brigadier General James Joseph Hornbrook. Katherine Sanno was the wife of Colonel Harris Pendleton. William Sanno was a rancher in Montana and served in the 2nd Cavalry Regiment during the Spanish–American War.
