= James A. Woodruff =

American military officer (1877–1969)

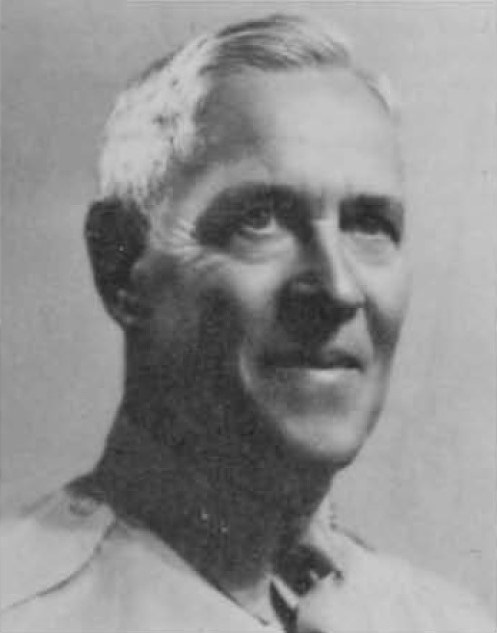
- Born: 19 June 1877; Fort Shaw, Montana
- Died: 20 August 1969 (aged 92) San Francisco, California
- Allegiance: United States
- Branch: United States Army
- Service years: 1899–1943
- Rank: Major General
- Commands: 1st Corps Area; Hawaiian Division; Hawaiian Separate Coast Artillery Brigade; San Francisco Port of Embarkation; North Atlantic Division; Philadelphia Engineer District; 13th Engineers; Command and General Staff School; New York City Engineer District; U.S. Army Engineer School; Seattle Engineer District; 20th Engineers and Attached Service Troops; 10th Engineers (Forestry); Vicksburg Engineer District
- Conflicts: Philippine–American War; World War I; World War II
- Awards: Distinguished Service Medal

James Albert Woodruff (19 June 1877 – 20 August 1969) was a military engineer and United States Army major general. During World War I, he supervised the harvesting, milling and shipping of lumber for the allied forces in France. As colonel of the 20th Engineers and Attached Service Troops, he had direct command of over 20,000 officers and men in fourteen battalions harvesting French timber and operating 282 sawmills. A skilled leader and educator, he held many other commands over the course of his 44-year military career.

== Early life and education ==
Woodruff was born at Fort Shaw, Montana, the son of 1871 West Point graduate Charles A. Woodruff. As a military dependent, his family soon moved to Santa Fe, New Mexico. He lived in several more places before settling in San Francisco, where he began high school. Woodruff completed high school in Washington, D.C. and then attended St. Luke's Preparatory School in Wayne, Pennsylvania. He entered the United States Military Academy in June 1895 with an appointment from his father's home state of Vermont, eventually becoming Cadet First Captain. Woodruff graduated first in his class in February 1899 and was commissioned in the Army Corps of Engineers. He later graduated from the Army Engineer School in March 1901, the Army Staff College in July 1906 and the Army War College in May 1917.

== Military career ==
From March 1899 to September 1900, Woodruff was assigned to Rosebank, Staten Island in support of New York City harbor projects. From March 1901 to July 1903, he served with the 2nd Battalion of Engineers at Fort Totten, Queens and in the Philippines.

From August 1903 to August 1905 and again from August 1906 to August 1907, Woodruff taught civil and military engineering at West Point. He was promoted to captain in July 1904. From August 1907 to September 1910, Woodruff taught engineering at Fort Leavenworth, Kansas.

From October 1910 to August 1913, Woodruff commanded the Vicksburg Engineer District. He was promoted to major in February 1912. From August 1913 to September 1916, Woodruff served as an assistant to the Chief of Engineers in Washington, D.C.

=== World War I ===
In May 1917, Woodruff was promoted to lieutenant colonel and assigned to organize and command the 10th Engineers (Forestry). Forestry professionals, lumberjacks and sawmill operators were enlisted in the Corps of Engineers and then trained on the grounds of American University to operate logging and milling operations in France.

In August 1917, Woodruff received a temporary promotion to colonel. In September 1917, he left American University and traveled with his regiment to France while Col. William A. Mitchell, the top graduate of West Point in 1902, was assigned to organize and train the 20th Engineers (Forestry). From November 1917 to May 1918, ten additional battalions of forestry personnel were sent to France. In June 1918, Mitchell was reassigned to command the 2nd Engineers, 2nd Division and Woodruff assumed command of all forestry personnel, consisting of 49 engineer companies and 28 engineer service companies with fourteen battalion headquarters. This giant regiment, called the 20th Engineers and Attached Service Troops, was a merger of the 10th and 20th Engineers (Forestry), the 41st, 42nd and 43rd Engineers (Highway) and seven engineer service battalions. Brig. Gen. Edgar Jadwin held overall command of the Division of Construction and Forestry in France, with Woodruff as his deputy director. Woodruff's chief of forestry was Lt. Col. William B. Greeley, aided by Maj. Theodore S. Woolsey Jr.

The combined regiment built 81 new sawmills and cut over 272.5 million feet (83,06 million meters) of lumber, producing railroad ties, telephone poles, general construction material and firewood. Woodruff remained in command until July 1919 and was awarded the Distinguished Service Medal.

=== Later career ===
From September 1919 to August 1920, Woodruff commanded the Seattle Engineer District. He reverted to his permanent rank of lieutenant colonel in October 1919. From August 1920 to October 1921, Woodruff served as assistant commandant of the Engineer School. He received a permanent promotion to colonel in May 1921. From October 1921 to September 1924, Woodruff served as commandant of the Engineer School.

From September 1924 to September 1927, Woodruff served as chief of staff of the Panama Canal Department. From September 1927 to August 1928, he commanded the New York City Engineer District. From August 1928 to July 1931, Woodruff served as director of the Command and General Staff School. From July 1931 to May 1933, he served as assistant commandant at Fort Leavenworth.

From June to August 1933, Woodruff was director of Public Buildings and Public Parks of the National Capitol. From September to November 1933, he was commanding officer of the 13th Engineers at Fort Humphreys, Virginia. From December 1933 to June 1934, Woodruff commanded the Philadelphia Engineer District. From June 1934 to February 1935, he commanded the North Atlantic Division. Woodruff was promoted to brigadier general in February 1935.

From March 1935 to January 1937, Woodruff commanded the San Francisco Port of Embarkation. From January 1937 to March 1938, he served as commanding officer of the Hawaiian Separate Coast Artillery Brigade. Woodruff was promoted to major general in March 1938. From March 1938 to March 1939, he commanded the Hawaiian Division. From April 1939 to June 1941, Woodruff served as commanding officer of the First Corps Area in Boston. He retired from active duty on 30 June 1941, having reached the mandatory retirement age of 64.

Woodruff moved to Honolulu in 1941, but his retirement was cut short by the Japanese attack on Pearl Harbor. He returned to active duty from December 1941 to August 1943 as president of the Military Commission under martial law in Hawaii. Woodruff served an additional week of active duty in September 1943 before retiring permanently.

== Family and later life ==
Woodruff was the son of Brig. Gen. Charles Albert Woodruff and his wife Louise Virginia (Duff) Woodruff. His younger brother Charles Armijo Woodruff was a 1906 United States Naval Academy graduate who briefly served as governor of American Samoa. One of his sisters, Genevieve, was married to General Malin Craig, the Chief of Staff of the United States Army from 1935 to 1939.

In December 1904, Woodruff married Margarett Hubbell (23 September 1881 – 1 December 1967), the daughter of Brig. Gen. Henry Wilson Hubbell and granddaughter of Brigadier General John T. Sprague. Their daughter Margarett Stafford Hubbell married Francis Joseph Johnson, a 1929 Naval Academy graduate who retired as a rear admiral. Their son James Albert Woodruff Jr. (5 August 1908 – 21 January 1997) was a 1930 Naval Academy graduate who retired as a commander. As of August 1969, Woodruff and his wife had five grandchildren and five great-grandchildren.

After his 1943 retirement, Woodruff and his wife settled in Coronado, California. After over twenty years there, they moved to San Francisco. Woodruff, his wife, his son and his daughter-in-law are buried together at San Francisco National Cemetery. he died in San Francisco, California in 1969.
