= James Joseph Hornbrook =

United States Army general

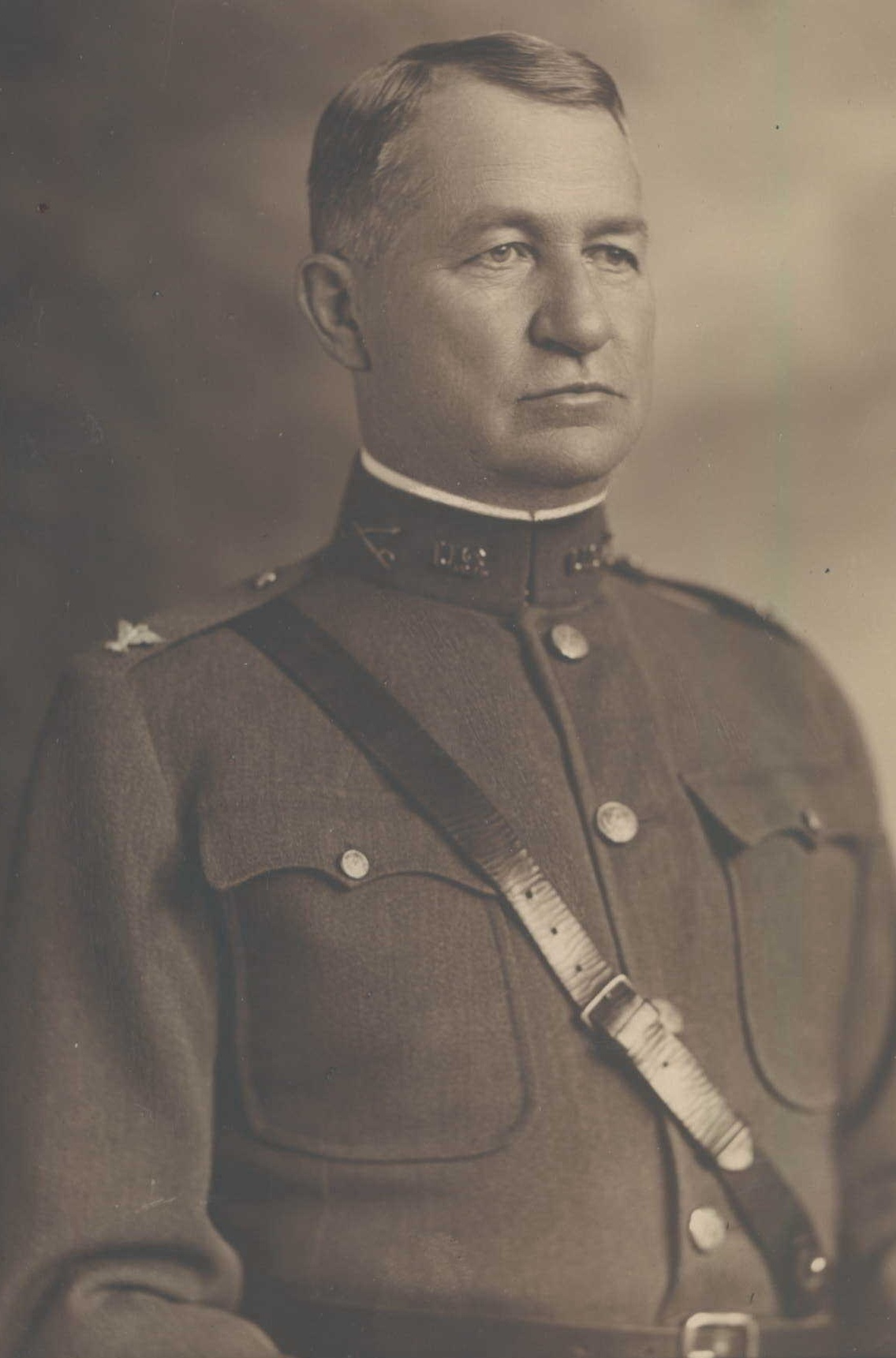
- Hornbrook as commander of the 5th Cavalry, circa 1920
- Born: August 5, 1868; Evansville, Indiana, US
- Died: October 1, 1942 (aged 74); Hollywood, California, US
- Burial place: Arlington National Cemetery, Arlington, Virginia
- Spouse: Mary Genevieve Worth Sanno (m. 1895–1942, his death)
- Military career
- Allegiance: United States
- Branch: United States Army
- Service years: 1890–1929
- Rank: Brigadier General
- Service number: 0-294
- Unit: Cavalry Branch
- Commands: 4th Train Headquarters, 4th Division; El Paso District; 5th Cavalry Regiment; Big Bend District
- Conflicts: Spanish–American War; Pancho Villa Expedition; World War I

James Joseph Hornbrook (August 5, 1868 – October 1, 1942) was an American brigadier general during World War I. Hornbrook participated in frontier duty, the Spanish–American War, the Pancho Villa Expedition, and World War I.

== Early life and education ==
Hornbrook was born in Evansville, Indiana, on August 5, 1868, to Saunders Richards Hornbrook and his wife, Lucy (Wheeler) Hornbrook. He attended the schools of Evansville and graduated from Evansville High School in 1884.

Hornbrook was then selected to attend the United States Military Academy (USMA) at West Point, New York, from where he graduated, 33rd in a class of 54, in June 1890.

== Military career ==
After his commissioning, Hornbrook joined the 2nd Cavalry at Fort Bowie, Arizona. On February 2, 1907, he received the rank of captain. He served as paymaster for the 12th Cavalry Regiment at Fort Omaha, Nebraska, and in Manila, Philippines from October 1, 1908, to October 1, 1912.

He attained the rank of major and served with the 6th Cavalry Regiment on October 3, 1912. He participated in the Punitive Expedition in 1916 and 1917.

During World War I, he traveled to France with the 4th Division. Hornbrook returned stateside on July 31, 1918, and was stationed at Headquarters for the Southern Department until August 11, 1918.

He was honorably discharged from federal service as a brigadier general on March 10, 1919. He returned to the rank of colonel. From October 1, 1919, to May 26, 1920, Hornbrook commanded the 5th Cavalry Regiment at Big Bend District, Texas.

He retired from the army on September 2, 1929.

== Family life ==
In 1895, Hornbrook married Mary Worth Sanno, the daughter of Brigadier General James M. J. Sanno (1840–1907), a career army officer and Union veteran of the American Civil War and the granddaughter of Brigadier General John T. Sprague.

== Death and legacy ==
Hornbrook died in Hollywood, California, on October 1, 1942. He was buried at Arlington National Cemetery.
