= 39th New Jersey Infantry Regiment =

- Active: October 3, 1864, to June 17, 1865
- Country: United States
- Allegiance: Union
- Branch: Infantry
- Engagements: Petersburg Campaign

The 39th New Jersey Infantry Regiment was an infantry regiment from the state of New Jersey that was raised to fight in the American Civil War. It was one of three units to be raised after President Abraham Lincoln called for five hundred thousand more men in July 1864 to finish off the Confederacy.

== Service ==
West Point graduate and Regular Army officer Abram Calvin Wildrick was appointed colonel and commander of the 39th New Jersey Infantry Regiment, and James H. Close, a veteran officer who served in the 2nd New Jersey Volunteer Infantry, became the regiment's lieutenant colonel. Because the unit was being organized late in the war, enlistees became hard to find. To attract more enrollees, bounties became higher than usual, yet by early October 1864, only five companies had been organized. On October 4, those five companies left the state for the front. By October 21, the remainder of the regiment joined them, and the united unit had a total strength at about one thousand men.

Through the next five months, the men of the 39th New Jersey experienced hard service in the trenches around Petersburg, Virginia. However, it wasn't until April 2, 1865, when the men of the 39th New Jersey fought their first actual pitched battle. On that day, the Union Army enacted assaults on Confederate positions, which were designed to break the Siege of Petersburg. At the onset of the Attack on Fort Mahone, the 39th New Jersey was charged with leading the assault and hacking through the enemy's defenses including the Cheval de frise. Four other veteran regiments from Vermont followed the charge but the 39th suffered heavy losses in the assault. At the end of the battle, the regiment suffered 17 killed and 74 wounded, a total of 91 casualties.

The regiment was mustered out on June 17, 1865, with 819 men. On April 2, 1865, Colonel Wildrick received a brevet rank of brigadier general in the Regular Army for his leadership.

== Regimental statistics ==
Killed or died of wounds
3 Officers
29 Enlisted men

Wounded who recovered
1 Officer
60 Enlisted men

Died of disease or accidents
-Officer
10 Enlisted

== See also ==
- List of New Jersey Civil War Units
