= John T. Sprague =

American military officer (1810–1878)

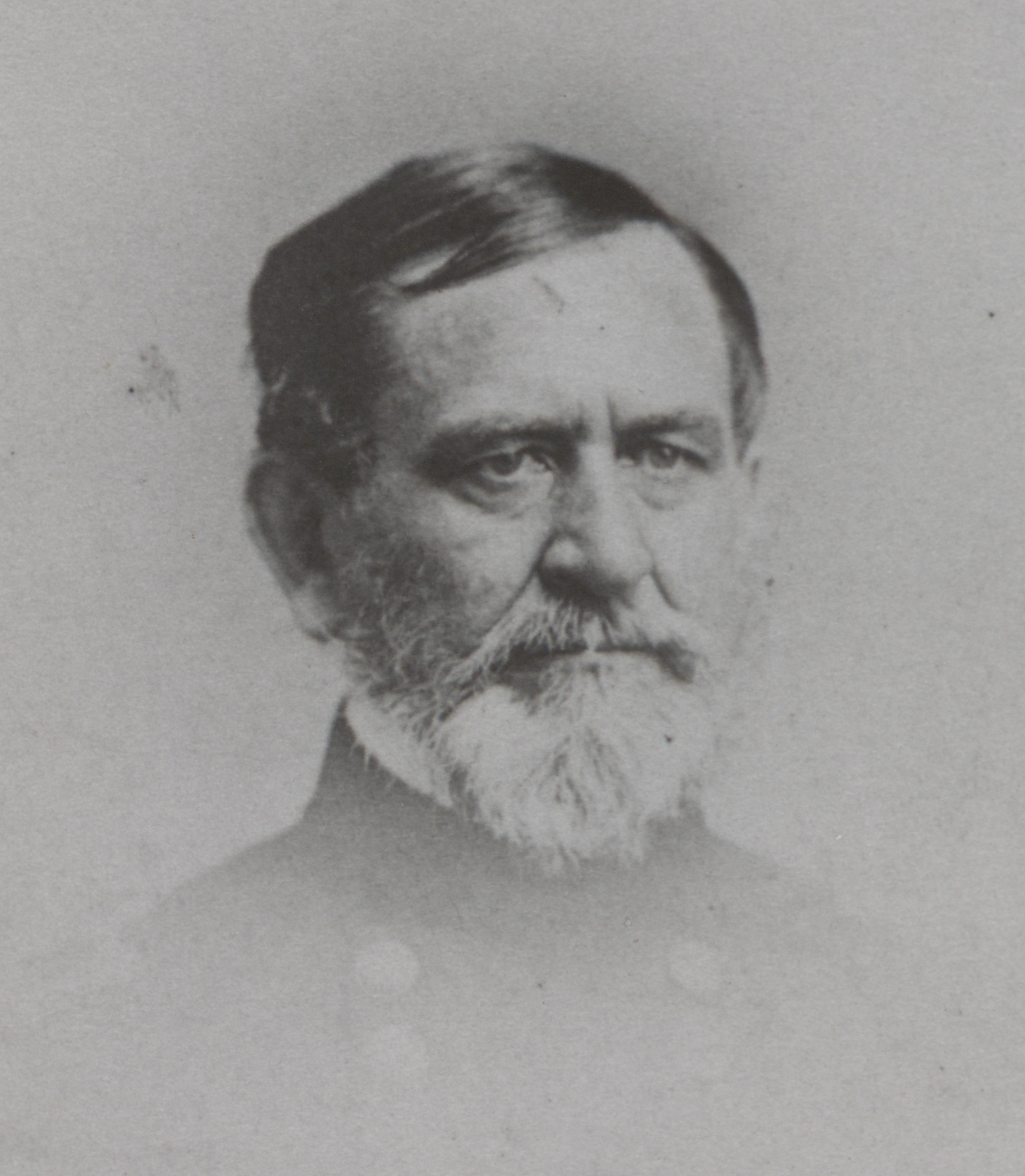
- Sprague as Adjutant General of New York c. 1863
- Born: John Titcomb Sprague; 3 July 1810; Newburyport, Massachusetts, US
- Died: 6 September 1878 (aged 68); Manhattan, New York, US
- Burial place: Albany Rural Cemetery, Menands, New York, US
- Spouse: Mary Worth (m. 1843–1876)
- Children: 5
- Relatives: Lawrence Sprague Babbitt (nephew)
- Military career
- Allegiance: United States; Union (American Civil War)
- Service: United States Marine Corps; United States Army; Union Army; New York Militia
- Service years: 1834–1837 (Marines); 1837–1861, 1865–1870 (US Army); 1861–1865 (Union Army); 1863–1865 (Militia)
- Rank: Second Lieutenant (Marines); Colonel (Army); Brigadier General (Brevet) (Union Army); Brigadier General (Militia)
- Unit: US Army Infantry Branch
- Commands: Department of Florida; Fort Brooke; Fort Inge; Company E, 8th Infantry Regiment; General Recruiting Service, New York; Adjutant General of New York; 7th Infantry Regiment
- Wars: Seminole Wars; American Indian Wars; Mexican–American War; American Civil War

John Titcomb Sprague (3 July 1810 – 6 September 1878) was a career officer in the United States Army. A three-year veteran of the United States Marine Corps (1834–1837), he served in the US Army from 1837 to 1861 and 1865 to 1870, and the Union Army during the American Civil War from 1861 to 1865. During the Civil War, he served concurrently as Adjutant General of New York and led the state militia during its wartime mobilization. Sprague attained the rank of colonel in the US Army, the brevet rank of brigadier general in the Union Army, and held the rank of brigadier general in the New York Militia.

A native of Newburyport, Massachusetts and the son of an army surgeon, Sprague was raised and educated at military posts including Detroit. As a teenager, he secured employment with the American Fur Company. While in Michigan, he came to the attention of territorial governor Lewis Cass, who entrusted him to carry out sensitive negotiations with Native American tribes in the western part of the territory. In 1834, Cass was serving as Secretary of War and recommended Sprague for a commission in the marine corps. He served for three years, including the Seminole Wars in Florida. In 1837, he received a commission in the army, after which he served in Florida and Texas, including command of the Department of Florida during the Mexican–American War.

During the American Civil War, Sprague carried out Union Army assignments as mustering and disbursing officer for New York and General Recruiting Service superintendent for New York. In 1863, he was concurrently appointed to serve as Adjutant General of New York, making him responsible for organizing the New York Militia and the state's contributions to the United States Volunteers raised for the war. After the war, Sprague commanded the 7th Infantry Regiment. He retired in 1870 and lived in St. Augustine, Florida, where he practiced law and was president of the St. John's Railroad. He later moved to Manhattan, where he died on 6 September 1878.

== Early life ==
John T. Sprague was born in Newburyport, Massachusetts on 3 July 1810, a son of army surgeon Lawrence Sprague and Sarah (Titcomb) Sprague. (Note: The Newburyport town birth records give Sprague's first name as "Jonathan" but it is recorded in all other sources as "John.") He was raised and educated on military posts as his family traveled for his father's career. In 1825, Lawrence Sprague was assigned to duty in Detroit, and his family, including John Sprague, accompanied him. Days later, Dr. Sprague was assigned to Fort Armstrong, Illinois; he was unwilling to subject his family to an arduous trip to a frontier post, so John Sprague remained in Detroit. He soon obtained a position with the American Fur Company, where he remained until 1831.

A friend recommended to Sprague a course of self-study, and while with American Fur, he educated himself on topics including mathematics and geology. While in Michigan, he met Lewis Cass, the governor of Michigan Territory. Cass entrusted Sprague to carry messages to and from American Indian tribes in Western Michigan, and the long trips through unpopulated areas gave him additional opportunities to study. When Cass became US Secretary of War in 1831, Sprague accompanied him to Washington, DC and served on his staff.

Cass continued to entrust Sprague with sensitive missions, including escorting Sauk leader Black Hawk on a post-Black Hawk War trip to Washington to meet Cass, then on a tour of the United States that ended at Black Hawk's home territory near what is now Davenport, Iowa. Sprague also met Keokuk, a Sauk leader who had attempted to prevent the war, near Keokuk's home territory in what is now Keokuk, Iowa, and was able to effect an 1833 agreement that each would allow the other to live in peace.

== Start of career ==
Sprague studied law while at the War Department, but ended his legal studies in July 1834, when Cass recommended him for a commission as a second lieutenant in the United States Marine Corps. Sprague accepted, and was part of the marine contingent commanded by Colonel Archibald Henderson that took part in the Creek War of 1836; at the end of the conflict, General Thomas Jesup appointed Sprague to escort 3,200 Creek people who had been forcibly removed from Georgia and Alabama to new lands in Arkansas. In July 1837, Sprague resigned his marine corps commission in order to accept one as a second lieutenant in the United States Army. He was initially assigned to the 5th United States Infantry Regiment, and in July 1838 he transferred to the 8th Infantry. In fact, he continued to perform duties related to negotiations with and removal of American Indians. After his duty in Arkansas, he was ordered to detain small groups of American Indians from various tribes in Missouri, Illinois, Wisconsin, and Michigan and relocate them to the west side of the Mississippi River near what is now Council Bluffs, Iowa.

In May 1839, Sprague was promoted to first lieutenant and assigned as aide-de-camp to General Alexander Macomb, who had taken charge of US troops during the Second Seminole War. He was present when Macomb concluded a peace treaty with Halleck Tustenuggee at Fort King, Florida, then joined the 8th Infantry at Madison Barracks, New York. When the 8th Infantry, led by Colonel (later Brevet Brigadier General) William J. Worth, was dispatched to Florida to compel the removal of the Seminoles, Sprague served as the regiment's assistant adjutant and Worth's aide-de-camp. In 1841, he again performed escort duty for Native Americans, this time Seminoles who were forced to move to Arkansas. While in Florida, Sprague resumed his legal studies under the supervision of Judge Isaac H. Bronson and attained admission to the bar.

In March 1842, Sprague's success in Florida was recognized with a brevet promotion to captain. When Worth was assigned to duty in Texas, Sprague was appointed to command the Department of Florida, where he was ordered to maintain peace between the Seminoles who remained in Florida and the influx of white migrants who settled there after the end of the war. In 1846, he succeeded in persuading Seminole leaders Billy Bowlegs, Sam Jones and their followers to make peace by obtaining a government appropriation of $30,000 to be used for payments to their followers and the purchase of clothing and other personal items. During the Mexican–American war, he remained in command in Florida and also commanded the post of Fort Brooke near modern-day Tampa. He was relieved of duty in Florida in July 1848, and received a brevet promotion to major in recognition of his superior service.

== Continued career ==
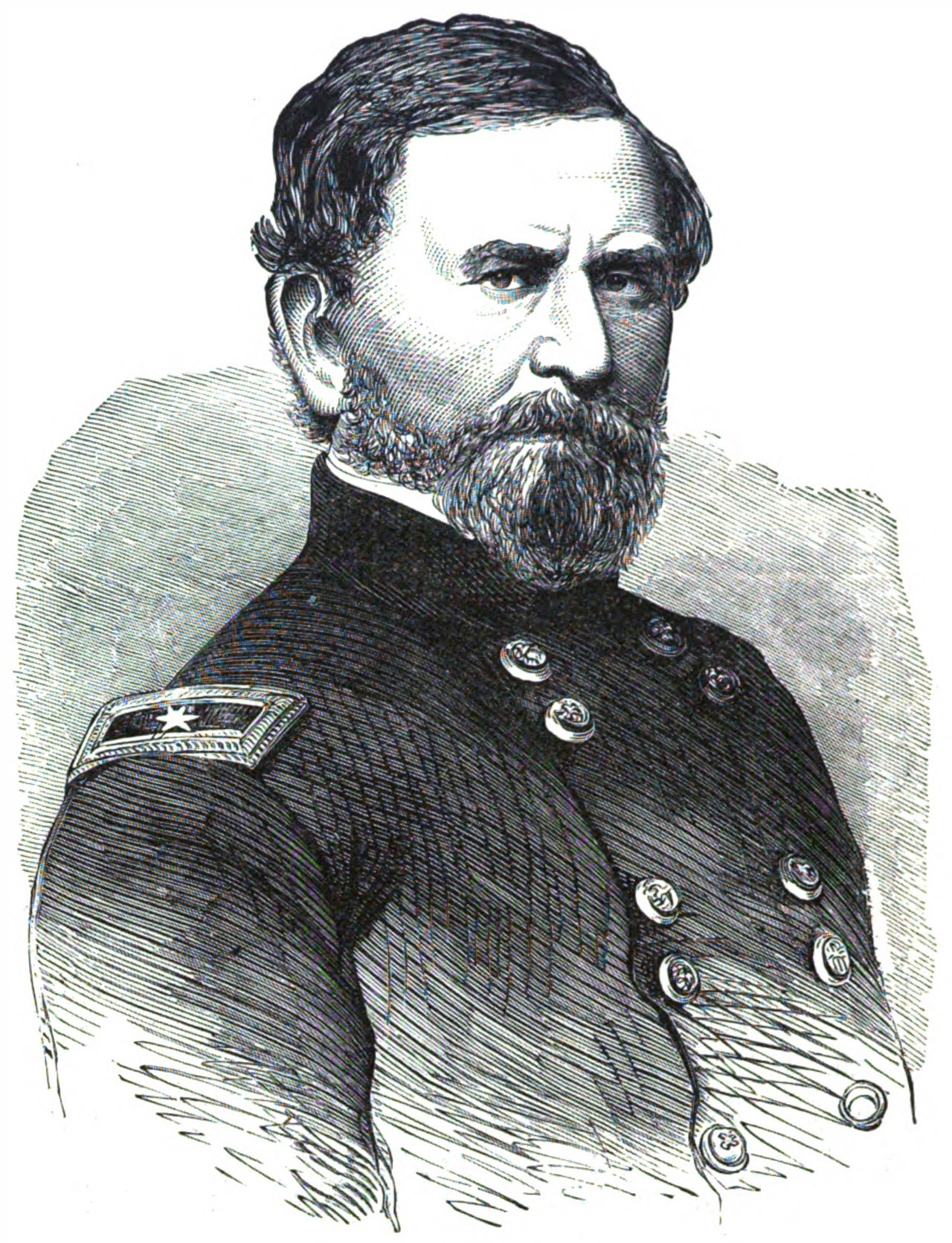
From 1893's The Soldier in our Civil War: A Pictorial History of the Conflict, 1861–1865

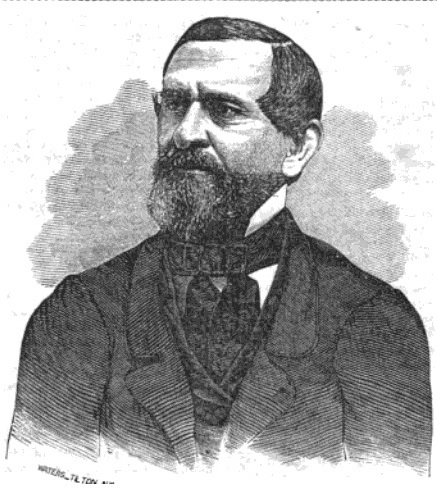
Sprague in 1859

Sprague arrived in Texas with elements of the 8th Infantry in January 1849 and was assigned to quartermaster duties. In January 1850, he was assigned to temporary command of Fort Inge on the Leona River where he organized a government wagon train that he was ordered to lead to El Paso. With Company E, Sprague left Fort Inge in July 1850 and joined the train, which had started out sooner and was already at Las Moras Springs. Sprague commanded the train, which included 450 citizens, 175 soldiers, nearly 350 wagons, and 4,000 livestock animals. Because of limited water and grass along the route, Sprague divided the train into two parts. Both observed Native Americans monitoring their travel but neither was attacked, and they reached El Paso in mid-September. In May 1852, Sprague was assigned to temporary recruiting duty in the eastern United States. In June 1855, he returned to his regiment, after which he served in Texas and New Mexico Territory, where he took part in expeditions against the Navajo, Apache, and Comanche. Before leaving New Mexico in August 1858, he received a vote of thanks from the Territorial Legislature, which recommended him to the president for promotion.

Between 1858 and 1861, Sprague took an extended leave of absence, during which he promoted a silver mining venture in southeastern New Mexico. In January 1861, he was ordered to American Civil War duty in Texas. He arrived in New Orleans in March and was subsequently pursued to Texas for openly expressing Union sentiments and denouncing Louisiana's secession convention. Upon arriving in San Antonio, he was prevented from continuing on to Fort Bliss and was detained by Confederate sympathizers who organized themselves as a committee of public safety. In April, he was paroled and left for New York. In June, he presented an account of his experience to the New-York Historical Society, "The Treachery in Texas". His paper was the initial firsthand account of events that led to federal authorities leaving Texas, and made nationwide headlines for its scathing denunciation of Confederate treatment of US soldiers who had been serving in Texas during the takeover.

In August 1861, Sprague was promoted to major in the 1st Infantry Regiment and assigned to Albany, New York as the army's mustering and disbursing officer for New York and superintendent of the General Recruiting Service for New York. In 1862, he was elected to command the 113th New York Volunteer Infantry Regiment, but the War Department declined to allow him to accept. In January 1863, Governor Horatio Seymour appointed him to succeed Thomas Hillhouse as Adjutant General of New York with the rank of brigadier general. He held this post until January 1865, and worked to organize, train, and equip the New York Militia and New York's contingents of United States Volunteers while continuing to perform his army duties. He was promoted to lieutenant colonel in the army in March 1863 and was succeeded as adjutant general by William Irvine.

== Later career ==
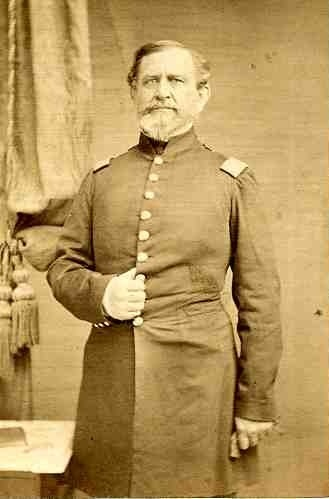
Sprague as adjutant general of New York in 1863

After leaving the adjutant general's post, Sprague was assigned as chief of staff for the headquarters of the Military Division of the Missouri. After the war, he received brevet promotions to colonel and brigadier general in recognition of his superior service. He was promoted to colonel in March 1865. In 1866, he was assigned to command the 7th Infantry Regiment and the district of Florida during the Reconstruction era. In 1868, Florida was readmitted to the Union, and Sprague turned administration over to the state authorities and continued in command of the 7th Infantry in St. Augustine. In March 1869, post-war force reductions led to several senior officers being designated as supernumerary, including Sprague. He remained on active duty with duties unassigned until December 1870, when he left the army under the provisions of a July law that permitted officers with 30 years of service to retire.

After retiring, Sprague lived in New York City and became involved in several business ventures, including becoming an original incorporator of the Texas and Pacific Railway in 1871. He later practiced law in St. Augustine, Florida and served as president of the St. John's Railroad. A Democrat who aligned himself in a coalition with "Reform" Republicans in opposition to the Republicans who controlled Florida's Reconstruction government, in 1872 he was a candidate for governor of Florida. The Democratic and Liberal Republican nominations went to William D. Bloxham, who lost the general election to Republican Ossian B. Hart. In 1875, he was mentioned as a candidate for US senator, but the Florida Legislature chose Democrat Charles W. Jones.

After the 1876 death of his wife, Sprague returned to New York City. He died in Manhattan on September 6, 1878. His funeral took place at St. George's Episcopal Church in Manhattan. Sprague was buried at Albany Rural Cemetery.

== Family ==
In 1843, Sprague married Mary Worth, a daughter of Brevet Major General William J. Worth. They were the parents of four children who reached adulthood:

- Mary "Maggie" Sprague (1847–1926), the wife of Brigadier General James M. J. Sanno.
- Sarah Worth Sprague (1854–1936), the wife of Brigadier General Henry Wilson Hubbell.
- Josephine "Josie" Worth Sprague (1863–1939), the wife of Brigadier General Alexander Lucian Dade.
- John T. Sprague (1865–1950), a physician who attained the rank of lieutenant colonel while serving as an army doctor during World War I.

Lawrence Sprague Babbitt (1839–1903), a career U.S. Army officer, was Sprague's nephew. Mary Genevieve Worth Sanno (1871–1966), the granddaughter of John T. Sprague, was the wife of army Brigadier General James Joseph Hornbrook. Sprague's grandson John T. Sprague (1902–1980) attained the rank of major general in the United States Air Force. Margaret Hubbell (1881–1967), the granddaughter of John T. Sprague, was the wife of army Major General James A. Woodruff.

== Works by ==
- The Origin, Progress, and Conclusions of the Florida War. New York, New York: D. Appleton & Company. 1848 – via Google Books.
- The Treachery In Texas. New York, New York: Press of the Rebellion Record. 1862 – via HathiTrust.
