= Apple Creek, Missouri =

- Unincorporated community
- Location of Perry County
- Coordinates: 37°36′46″N 89°45′03″W
- Country: United States
- State: Missouri
- County: Perry
- Township: Union
- Elevation: 476 ft (145 m)
- Time zone: UTC-6 (Central (CST))
  - Summer (DST): UTC-5 (CDT)
- ZIP code: 63775
- Area code: 573
- FIPS code: 29-01468
- GNIS feature ID: 736347

Apple Creek is an unincorporated community in south central Perry County, Missouri, United States, though not to be confused with the town of Old Appleton which was originally known as Apple Creek. The community is just north of Missouri Route F between I-55 to the west and U.S. Route 61 to the east. Uniontown lies two miles east on Route 61.

== Name ==
Apple Creek was named after the nearby stream called Apple Creek. The original French name of the creek was "Riviere à la Pomme" (apple river), named from the apple trees that had grown there. American settlers later translated the name to Apple River or Apple Creek.

== History ==
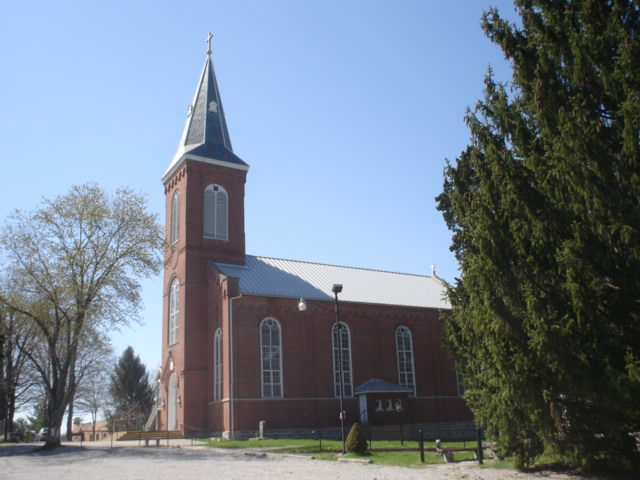
St. Joseph Roman Catholic Church

Apple Creek was originally known as Schnurbusch, and was named after a prominent family in the area.

In the early 1820s, German Catholic immigrants from the Baden area were the first to settle Apple Creek. These immigrants left Europe from the nearest ports, namely Le Havre, France and Antwerp, Belgium, and arrived in Perry County via New Orleans.

The settlement's first Catholic church, named St. Joseph and built in 1828, was used for 12 years; then a second church - called the Rock Church - was constructed. From 1881 to 1884, a new brick church was constructed for the St. Joseph parish. A rectory (1904) and convent (1917) were subsequently built as well. Our Lady of Saint Joseph shrine was built in 1857 and incorporates a cave spring with stonework and the via doloroso walkway.

== Notable person ==
- Manning M. Kimmel (1832–1916), an American and Confederate army officer who was the father of Admiral Husband E. Kimmel who was in charge of naval forces during the Attack on Pearl Harbor
