= Lawrence Sprague Babbitt =

United States Army officer (1839–1903)

Lawrence S. Babbitt
- From 1903's Thirty-fifth Annual Reunion of the Association of Graduates of the United States Military Academy
- Born: February 18, 1839; Boston, Massachusetts, United States
- Died: October 15, 1903 (aged 64); Dover, New Jersey, United States
- Burial place: Arlington National Cemetery, Virginia, United States
- Education: United States Military Academy
- Relatives: Edwin Burr Babbitt (son); Charles McDougall (father-in-law); Thomas Mower McDougall (brother-in-law); George Henry Weeks (brother-in-law)
- Military career
- Branch: United States Army
- Service years: 1861–1903
- Rank: Colonel
- Commands: Fort Monroe Arsenal; San Antonio Arsenal; Benicia Arsenal; Picatinny Powder Depot
- Conflicts: American Civil War; Manassas campaign; First Battle of Bull Run; Peninsula campaign; Siege of Yorktown; American Indian Wars

Lawrence Sprague Babbitt (February 18, 1839 – October 15, 1903) was a United States Army colonel. He was the father of Edwin Burr Babbitt.

== Biography ==
Babbitt in West Point uniform

Lawrence Sprague Babbitt served in the United States Army for 46 years. He was the son of Brevet Brigadier General Edwin Burr Babbitt, U.S. Army, and Sarah Stedman Sprague; the nephew of brigadier General John T. Sprague; the grandson of Surgeon Lawrence Sprague, U.S. Army, and Sarah Titcomb; and the great-grandson of Jonathan Titcomb, of Newburyport, Massachusetts, who was a member of the Provincial Congress of 1774.

Babbitt's father graduated from West Point in 1826; Babbitt in 1861; and Babbitt's son, Edwin Burr Babbitt, in 1884. Babbitt's sister Laura was the wife of Brigadier General George Henry Weeks, who graduated from West Point in 1857.

Babbitt was born in Boston, Massachusetts, on February 18, 1839. He entered the United States Military Academy on July 1, 1857. Graduating from the Academy on June 24, 1861, he was promoted to second lieutenant, Third Artillery. He served during the American Civil War in the Manassas campaign and the First Battle of Bull Run in 1861. He was brevetted first lieutenant for gallant and meritorious services in that action. He served in the Peninsula campaign and Siege of Yorktown in 1862. He was promoted to first lieutenant of ordnance on March 3, 1863. On March 13, 1865, he was brevetted captain for faithful and meritorious services during the war.

In 1861, Babbitt married Francis McDougall, the daughter of Brevet Brigadier General Charles McDougall, U.S. Army, and Maria Griffith Hanson.

Babbitt was promoted to captain of ordnance on December 22, 1866. From 1865 to 1877 he served in command of various government arsenals and as chief ordnance officer of departments. In 1877 he served in the Indian Wars against the Nez Perce and Bannocks. He was promoted to major of ordnance on May 10, 1878. He was in command of Fort Monroe Arsenal from 1879 to 1887. He was brevetted major on February 27, 1890, for gallant services in action against Indians at the Clearwater, Idaho, on July 11–12, 1877.

He was promoted to lieutenant-colonel of ordnance on September 15, 1890. He was in command of San Antonio Arsenal and chief ordnance officer for the Department of Texas from 1887 to 1890. He was promoted to colonel of ordnance on April 7, 1899. He was in command of Benicia Arsenal, California, from 1890 to 1899, and equipped the First Philippine Expedition in 1899.

Babbitt was in command of the U.S. Powder Depot in Dover, New Jersey, until February 18, 1903, when he was retired from active service. He died in Dover, New Jersey, on October 15, 1903.
