= Henry W. Hubbell =

United States Army brigadier general (1842–1917)

Henry Wilson Hubbell
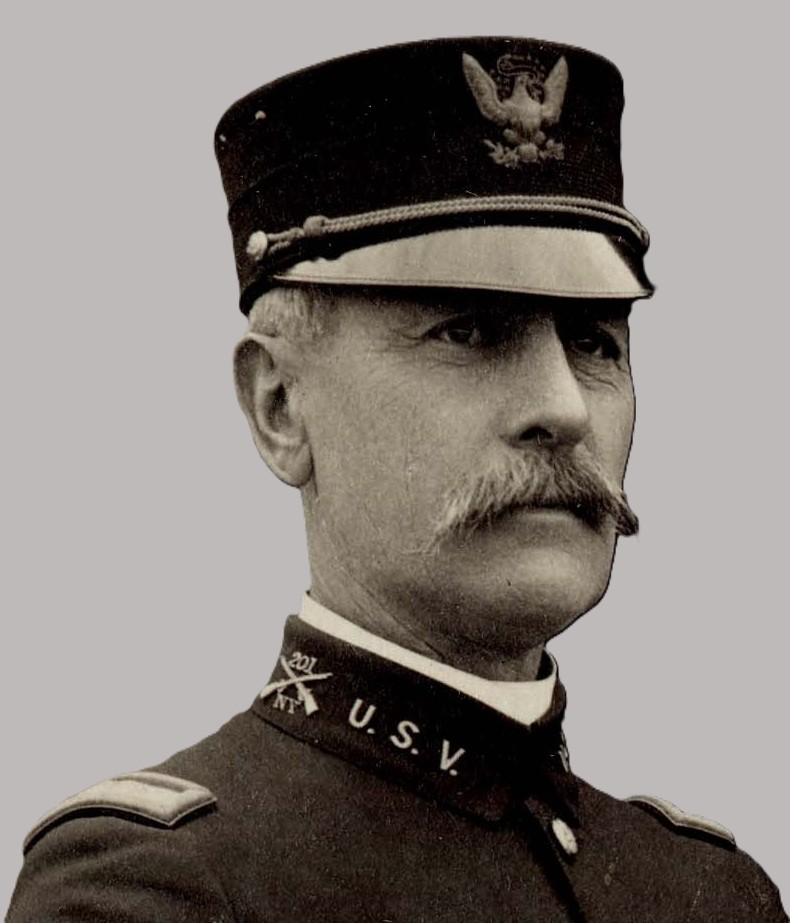
- Hubbell in 1898
- Born: 8 February 1842; Manhattan, New York, US
- Died: 15 December 1917 (aged 75); Washington, DC, US
- Burial place: Arlington National Cemetery
- Education: Mt. Pleasant Military Academy
- Spouse: Sarah Worth Sprague (m. 1877–1917)
- Children: 5
- Military career
- Allegiance: Union (American Civil War); United States
- Service: New York Militia; Union Army; United States Army
- Service years: 1861 (Militia); 1861–1863 (Union); 1867–1905 (United States)
- Rank: Brigadier General
- Units: US Army Infantry Branch; US Army Field Artillery Branch; US Army Coast Artillery Corps
- Commands: US Army Recruiting Office, Augusta, Georgia; Battery B, 1st Regiment of Artillery; Battery C, 1st Regiment of Artillery; 201st New York Volunteer Infantry Regiment; Coast Artillery District of the Delaware; Philippine Division Coast Artillery; Coast Artillery District of Pensacola
- Wars: American Civil War; American Indian Wars; Spanish–American War; Philippine–American War

Henry W. Hubbell (8 February 1842 – 15 December 1917) was a career officer in the United States Army. A Union Army veteran of the American Civil War and a veteran of the Spanish–American War, he served from 1861 to 1863 and 1867 to 1905. Hubbell was promoted to brigadier general on 19 May 1905 and retired for disability the next day.

== Early life ==
Henry Wilson Hubbell was born in Manhattan on 8 February 1842, the son of Henry Wilson Hubbell (1805–1884) and Jane Maria (Bostwick) Hubbell. He was raised and educated in New York and attended Ossining's Mt. Pleasant Military Academy from 1854 to 1860. In April 1861, he joined the New York Militia as a private in Company H, 7th Infantry Regiment. His unit took part in the Civil War Defenses of Washington from April to June 1861, and Hubbell was discharged after the regiment returned to New York.

== Start of career ==
In December 1861, he returned to military service when he joined the Union Army's 40th New York Infantry Regiment, and he was commissioned as a second lieutenant of United States Volunteers. Hubbell served in the Southeast, primarily as aide-de-camp to Major General Horatio Wright, who was chief engineer of the Union forces during the Battle of Port Royal. He remained with Wright during Wright's subsequent command of Union forces in and around Fernandina Beach, Jacksonville, and St. Augustine in Florida. During this service, Hubbell took part in the occupation of Tybee Island, Georgia and the Siege of Fort Pulaski, as well as the Battle of Secessionville, South Carolina.

From October to December 1862, Hubbell served on the staff of Brigadier General Quincy Adams Gillmore, commander of the X Corps in South Carolina. In 1863, Hubbell rejoined Wright during Wright's command of the Department of the Ohio. In April 1863, Wright was assigned to command of the Army of the Potomac's 1st Division, VI Corps and Hubbell remained on his staff. In the summer of 1863, he took part in the Gettysburg campaign, including the July Battle of Gettysburg. Hubbell continued to serve until October 1863, when he was mustered out of the army.

== Later career ==
Hubbell returned to military service in June 1867 when he was commissioned as a second lieutenant in the regular army. Assigned to the 1st Regiment of Artillery, he was promoted to first lieutenant in November 1873. Hubbell was stationed in Saint Augustine, Florida from 1873 to 1875, and at Fort Sill, Indian Territory from 1875 to 1877. While at Fort Sill, he acquired a collection of drawings of the Kiowa people, including the leader Satanta. His children later donated the drawings to the Smithsonian Institution. He was an 1877 graduate of the US Army Field Artillery School at Fort Monroe, Virginia.

In July 1877, Hubbell was appointed professor of military science and tactics at the Massachusetts Institute of Technology. From 1883 to 1886, he served as assistant professor of military science at Union College in Schenectady, New York. In August 1884, he was assigned to temporary duty with the General Recruiting Service and tasked with escorting a group of recruits from New York to the Pacific Coast. In 1888, Hubbell completed the Artillery School advanced course for officers. In August of that year, he was assigned to command a new recruiting office in Augusta, Georgia. He continued his service with the 1st Artillery, received promotion to captain in August 1889, and was assigned to command Battery B at the Presidio of San Francisco. He was later appointed to command Battery C, which served at posts including Fort Moultrie, South Carolina.

== Later career ==
In 1898, Hubbell joined the United States Volunteers for the Spanish–American War; commissioned as a colonel in July 1898, he commanded the 201st New York Volunteer Infantry Regiment, a unit of 2nd Brigade, 2nd Division, Second Army Corps. The regiment was stationed at Camp Black, New York, then Camp George G. Meade, Pennsylvania during its organization and training. The 201st New York was later transferred to Camp Wetherill, South Carolina, where it was completing final training when the war ended. The regiment was discharged and Hubbell was mustered out of the volunteers in April 1899. In August 1899, he was commissioned as a major of volunteers and assigned to the 47th U.S. Volunteer Infantry, and he served until he was mustered out of the volunteers in October.

In August 1900, Hubbell was promoted to major in the 4th Regiment of Artillery. In June 1902, he received promotion to lieutenant colonel. In November 1901, he was appointed to command the Coast Artillery District of the Delaware, with headquarters at Fort DuPont. In August 1903, Hubbell was promoted to colonel. In 1903 and 1904, he served in the Philippine–American War as commander of the Philippine Division Coast Artillery. In 1904 and 1905, he was assigned to Fort Barrancas, Florida as commander of the Coast Artillery District of Pensacola. On 19 May 1905, Hubbell was promoted to brigadier general under the provisions of a law that permitted Civil War veterans with 40 years of service to be advanced one grade. He retired for disability on 20 May, about nine months before he would have attained the mandatory retirement age of 64.

== Retirement and death ==
In retirement, Hubbell was a resident of Washington, DC. His memberships included the General Society of Colonial Wars, Sons of the American Revolution, Military Order of the Loyal Legion of the United States, and Army Athletic Association. In addition, he belonged to the Army and Navy Club of Washington, D.C. and the Fauquier Club of Warrenton, Virginia. He died at his home in the Chevy Chase neighborhood of Washington on 15 November 1917. Hubbell was buried at Arlington National Cemetery.

== Family ==
In 1877, Hubbell married Sarah Worth Sprague, the daughter of Brigadier General John T. Sprague and granddaughter of Major General William J. Worth. They were the parents of five children; Edith, Henry, Margaret, Stafford, and Reginald. Margaret Hubbell was the wife of Major General James A. Woodruff. Sarah Sprague Hubbell's sister Maggie was the wife of Brigadier General James M. J. Sanno. Her sister Josie was the wife of Brigadier General Alexander Lucian Dade.

== Dates of rank ==
Hubbell's effective dates of rank were:

- Brigadier General, 19 May 1905
- Colonel, 3 August 1903
- Lieutenant Colonel, 18 June 1902
- Major, 10 August 1900
- Major (Volunteers), 17 August 1899
- Colonel (Volunteers), 11 July 1898
- Captain, 9 August 1889
- First Lieutenant, 17 November 1873
- Second Lieutenant, 18 June 1867
- Second Lieutenant (Volunteers), 4 December 1861
- Private (Volunteers), 17 April 1861
