= Charles McDougall (United States Army) =

United States Army officer (1804–1885)

Charles D. McDougall (September 21, 1804 – July 25, 1885) was an officer in the United States Army.

== Biography ==
McDougall was born September 21, 1804, to John and Margaret McDougall in Chillicothe, Ohio. On April 15, 1830, he married Maria Griffith Hanson in Indianapolis, Indiana. They would have six children, including Thomas Mower McDougall. Fannie, one of his daughters, would marry Lawrence Sprague Babbitt. He died on July 25, 1885, in Clarke County, Virginia, and was buried at Jefferson Barracks National Cemetery.

== Career ==
McDougall was a surgeon in the United States Army during the Blackhawk War, the Seminole Wars, and the American Civil War. Other assignments he received include serving at the United States Military Academy and at Fort Winnebago. On February 25, 1865, he was promoted to Brevet Brigadier General.
