= Manning M. Kimmel =

American Union Army and Confederacy officer (1832–1916)

Manning Marius Kimmel
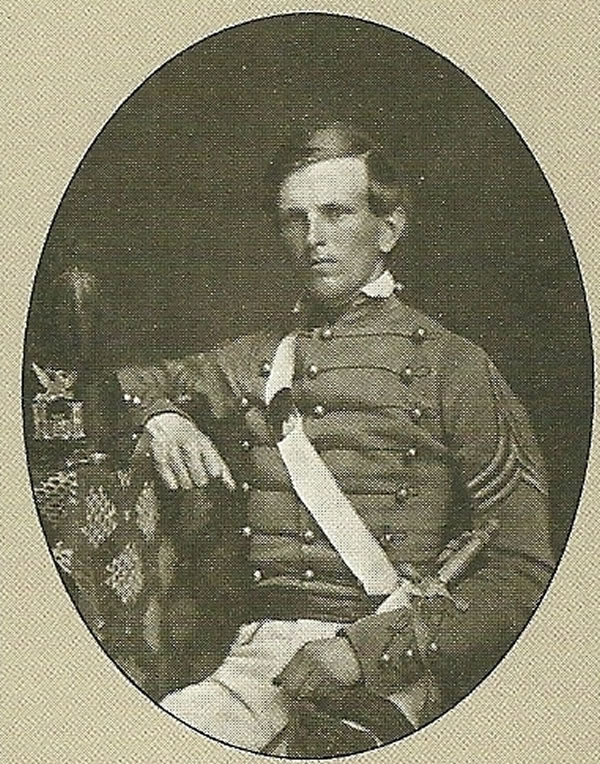
- Kimmel in the late 1850s
- Born: October 25, 1832; Apple Creek, Missouri, US
- Died: February 27, 1916 (aged 83); Henderson, Kentucky, US
- Military career
- Allegiance: United States of America; Confederate States of America
- Branch: United States Army; Confederate States Army
- Service years: 1857–1861 (United States Army); 1861–1865 (Confederate States Army)
- Rank: 1st Lieutenant (USA); Major (CSA)
- Conflicts: Comanche Wars; Cortina Troubles; American Civil War; First Battle of Bull Run (Union)

Manning Marius Kimmel (October 25, 1832 – February 27, 1916), also known as Marius Manning Kimmel, was a military officer who served on both sides of the American Civil War. He entered the United States Military Academy at West Point in 1853 and graduated in 1857. After initially fighting for the Union, he switched sides to the Confederacy, one of four West Point graduates to fight on both sides during the war. In the Confederate Army, he served as adjutant general and assistant adjutant general on the staff of generals Benjamin McCulloch and Earl Van Dorn, and as inspector general on John Magruder's staff. He was the father of Admiral Husband E. Kimmel, who commanded the United States Pacific Fleet during the Attack on Pearl Harbor.

== Early life ==
Born on October 25, 1832, at Apple Creek in Perry County, Missouri, Kimmel was the second child of Joseph Singleton Husband Kimmel and Caroline Monica (née Manning) Kimmel. His father was a prosperous merchant and a member of the St. Louis City Council between 1840 and 1850, and his mother died during Kimmel's birth. Joseph Kimmel remarried four years later to Sarah Gorgas, and had three stepchildren.

He attended Princeton University, but was dismissed in his junior year, according to family legend, for organizing a protest meeting against a faculty warning against students using a local billiard-saloon. Kimmel then obtained an appointment to the United States Military Academy, entering on July 1, 1853, and graduating with the Class of 1857 on July 1 of that year. He was ranked 22nd out of 38 cadets in his class.

== Military service ==
=== Frontier campaigns ===
Kimmel was brevetted to Second Lieutenant after his graduation and sent to the Cavalry School of Practice at Carlisle, Pennsylvania. Receiving the full rank of Second Lieutenant on August 18, 1858, he was assigned to the 2nd Cavalry (later redesignated the 5th Cavalry Regiment), stationed in Texas. Kimmel served with the regiment in frontier operations against the Comanche tribe and Mexican outlaws for the next two years, and was promoted to First Lieutenant on April 1, 1861.

He was stationed at Camp Radziminski from 1858 to 1859 and in 1859 at Camp Cooper, serving in Earl Van Dorn's "Wichita Expedition" against the Comanches. On February 10, 1859, he became acting commander of G Company, 2nd Cavalry after its commander was put on trial for shooting and killing a soldier who disobeyed orders and its first lieutenant went on recruiting duty. On May 13, 1859, he fought in an action that became known as the Battle of Crooked Creek at the camp of Comanche leader Buffalo Hump, erroneously identified as the Nescutunga Valley. During the battle, Kimmel led a detachment of dismounted skirmishers from G Company.

From 1859 to 1860, Kimmel was stationed at Fort Inge, and in 1860 he participated in the regiment's march to Brownsville, from which they operated against Mexican guerrillas led by Juan Cortina in the Cortina Troubles until the outbreak of the Civil War. Kimmel and future Union cavalry commander George Stoneman led two companies from the regiment alongside Rip Ford's Texas Rangers in April 1860 when Ford made an incursion into Mexico at Reynosa, which was suspected of giving aid to Cortina.

=== Civil War ===
At the beginning of the Civil War, the regiment was sent east to defend the capital via Indianola, Texas, and Carlisle, and fought in the Union defeat at the First Battle of Bull Run on July 21, during which Kimmel was commended for gallant conduct. The 2nd Cavalry retreated to the Washington defenses, after which Kimmel resigned his commission on August 14, at the Galt House in Louisville, Kentucky, and joined the Confederate Army with the rank of Major. This made him one of the four West Point graduates to serve on both sides in the war, along with William T. Magruder, Donald C. Stith, and Richard K. Meade. Kimmel became adjutant-general on the staff of Brigadier-General Benjamin McCulloch, until the latter was killed on March 7, 1862, in the Battle of Pea Ridge. Kimmel then became the assistant adjutant-general on the staff of Major General Earl Van Dorn, McCulloch's superior. After Van Dorn was shot by an angry husband on May 7, 1863, Kimmel briefly was the Confederate adjutant-general of Missouri, and later became acting assistant and inspector-general on Major General John B. Magruder's staff, in which capacity he ended the war.

== Later life ==
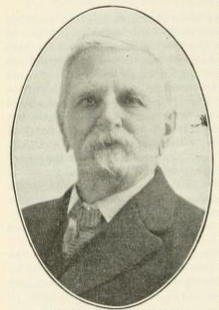
Kimmel, photographed in 1910

After the end of the war, fearing reprisals like many Confederate veterans, Kimmel fled Houston on horseback to Mexico City and became a civil engineer there, working on the construction of the railroad connecting Mexico City and Vera Cruz (or Imperial Mexican Railway), before coming back to Cape Girardeau, Missouri in 1866. While in Mexico, he served as a mercenary for Maximilian I, according to contemporary letters Kimmel wrote to his close friend and fellow 2nd Cavalry officer Fitzhugh Lee. He married Sibbella Lambert on December 28, 1868, and moved to Henderson, Kentucky, in 1872, where he worked as a civil engineer and superintendent for the Saint Bernard Mining Company at St. Charles. Kimmel had seven children, including Husband E. Kimmel (born 1882), who went on to command the United States Pacific Fleet during the Pearl Harbor attack. He worked as a civil engineer until 1884, when he resigned from the company, and was a coal dealer and real estate agent from 1885. Kimmel lived in Henderson for the rest of his life, serving on its school board and city council. Kimmel died of a cerebral hemorrhage at his home on February 27, 1916, at age 83, and was buried in the city's Fernwood Cemetery. A state historical marker was later placed at his home in Henderson, at 512 North Green Street.

== Bibliography ==
- Chalfant, William Young (1991). Without Quarter: The Wichita Expedition and the Fight on Crooked Creek. Norman: University of Oklahoma Press. ISBN 9780806123677.
- Collins, Michael L. (2008). Texas Devils: Rangers and Regulars on the Lower Rio Grande, 1846–1861. Norman: University of Oklahoma Press. ISBN 978-0806141329.
- Cullum, George W. (1891). George W. Cullum's Register of Officers and Graduates of the United States Military Academy. Vol. 2. OCLC 664840242.
- Ford, John Salmon (2010) [1963]. Oates, Stephen B. (ed.). Rip Ford's Texas. Austin: University of Texas Press. ISBN 9780292789203.
- Hsieh, Wayne (2009). West Pointers and the Civil War: The Old Army in War and Peace. Chapel Hill: University of North Carolina Press. ISBN 9780807832783.
