= Abram Calvin Wildrick =

U.S. Army officer

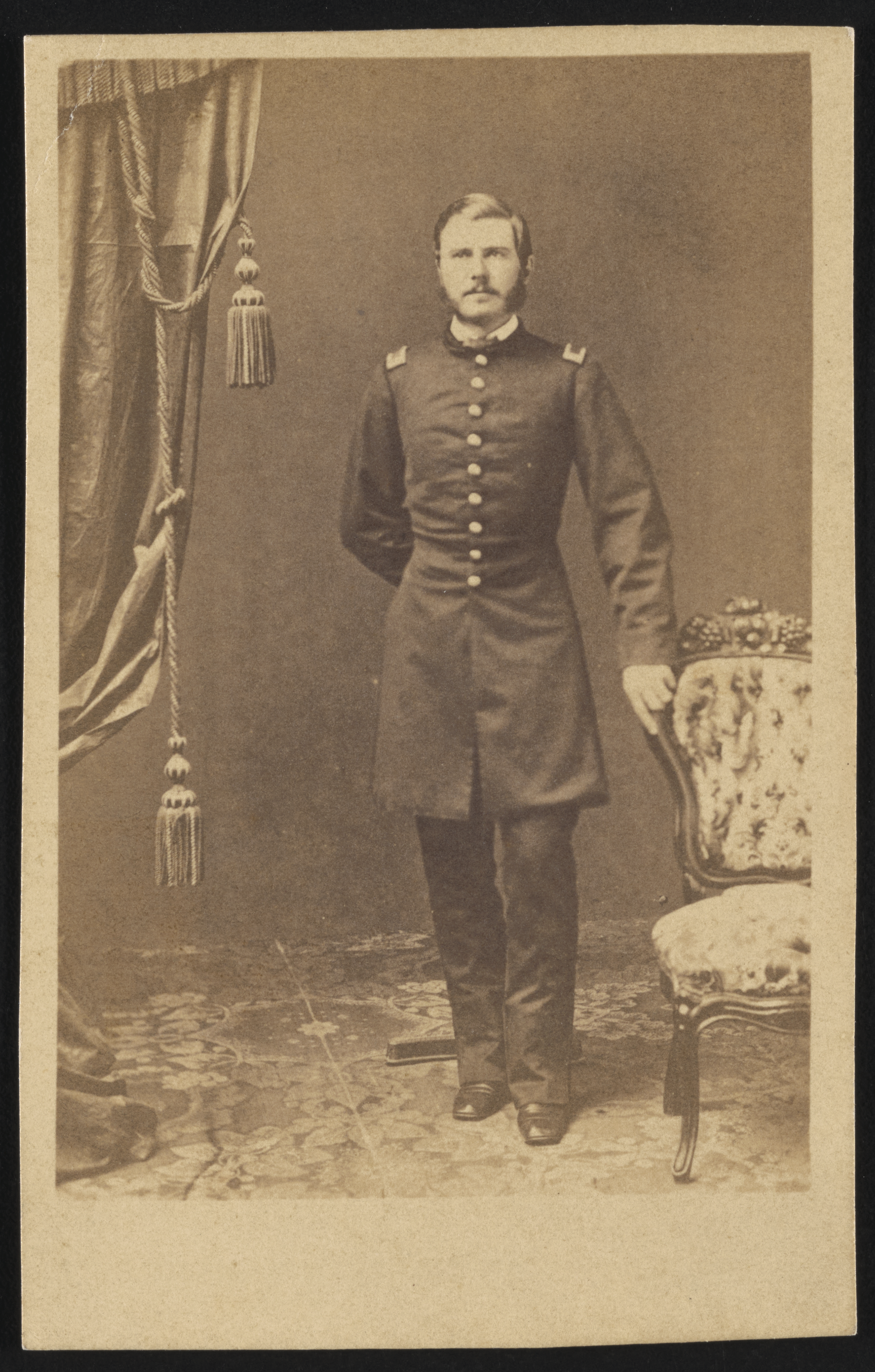
- Wildrick c. 1860's
- Born: August 5, 1836; Blairstown, New Jersey, U.S.
- Died: November 16, 1894 (aged 58); Fort Wadsworth, New York, U.S.
- Burial place: West Point Cemetery
- Education: United States Military Academy
- Relatives: Isaac Wildrick (father)
- Military career
- Allegiance: United States
- Branch: Union Army
- Service years: 1857–1894
- Rank: Brevet Brigadier General; Colonel
- Unit: 39th New Jersey Volunteer Infantry
- Conflicts: Mormon wars; Utah War; American Civil War

Abram Calvin Wildrick (August 5, 1836 – November 16, 1894) was a career United States Army officer who served in the Union Army during the American Civil War. In 1866, he was nominated and confirmed for appointment to the grade of brevet brigadier general of volunteers to rank from April 2, 1865.

== Early life and education ==
Abram Calvin Wildrick was born in Blairstown, New Jersey, on August 5, 1836. He was the son of former New Jersey U.S. Representative Isaac Wildrick. Abram Wildrick graduated from the United States Military Academy on July 1, 1857.

== Career ==
Wildrick was appointed a brevet second lieutenant on July 1, 1857, a second lieutenant on October 5, 1857, and a first lieutenant on April 27, 1861. After serving as an assistant adjutant general in August 1861 until September 13, 1861, he was appointed assistant quartermaster for the District of Oregon in the Department of the Pacific on September 13, 1861. He was promoted to captain in the Regular Army (United States) on February 8, 1864.

On October 11, 1864, Wildrick was appointed colonel of the 39th New Jersey Volunteer Infantry Regiment. The regiment had just been organized. The regiment then participated in the Siege of Petersburg and fought at the Third Battle of Petersburg on April 2, 1865, as part of Brigadier General Robert B. Potter's division. Wildrick received brevet appointments as a major and lieutenant colonel in the regular army and a brigadier general of volunteers for his service at Petersburg. Wildrick was mustered out of the volunteers on June 17, 1865.

On January 13, 1866, President Andrew Johnson nominated Wildrick for appointment to the grade of brevet brigadier general of volunteers, to rank from August 2, 1865, and the United States Senate confirmed the appointment on March 12, 1866.

Wildrick was promoted to major in the regular army on November 3, 1882, and to lieutenant colonel in the regular army on July 1, 1892. He retired from the army on October 10, 1894.

== Death ==
Wildrick died at Fort Wadsworth, New York on November 16, 1894. He was interred at West Point National Cemetery on the grounds of the United States Military Academy in West Point, New York.

== See also ==
- List of American Civil War brevet generals (Union)
