= Thomas Mower McDougall =

United States Army officer (1845–1909)

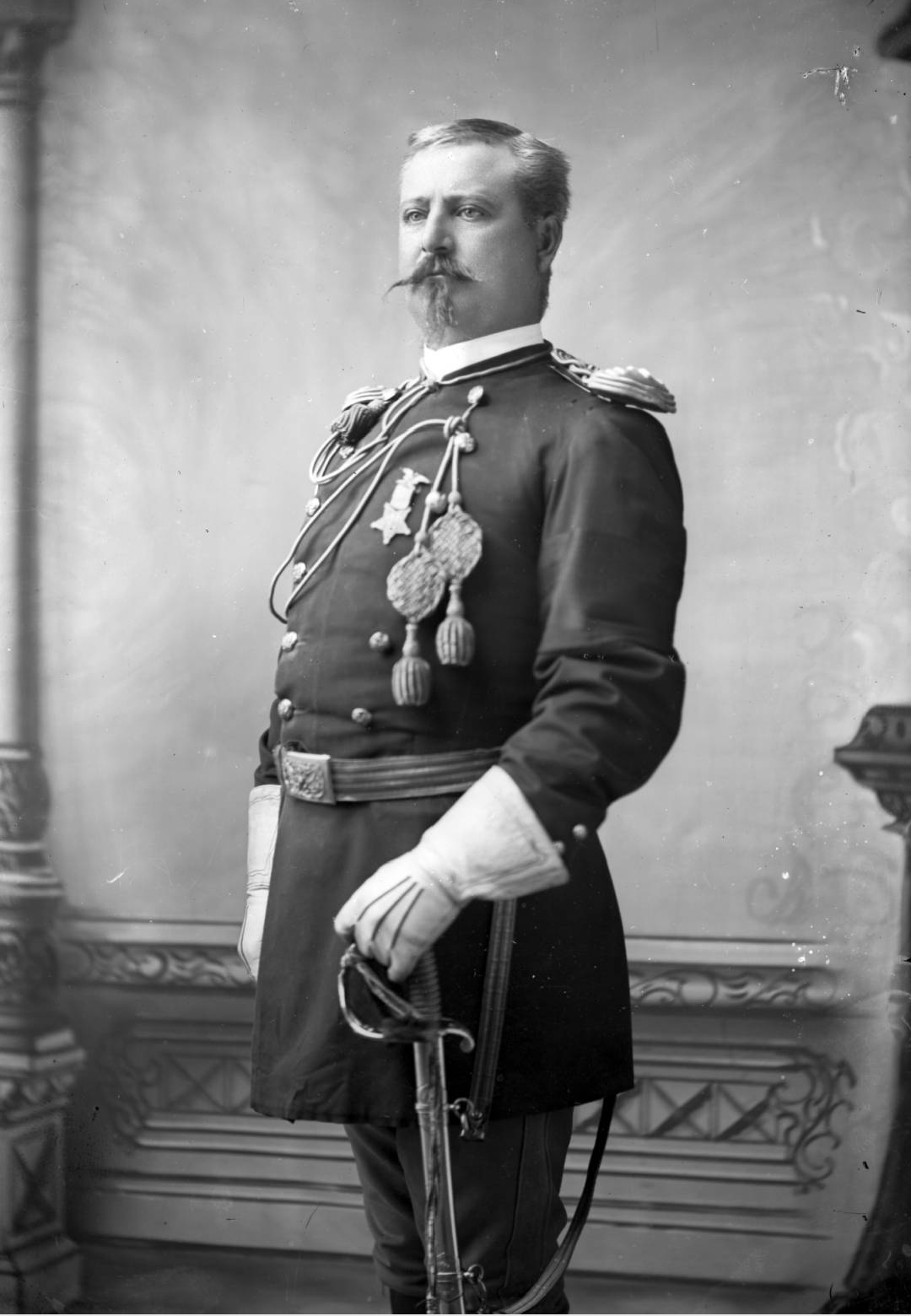
Thomas Mower McDougall in full dress uniform.

Thomas Mower McDougall (21 May 1845 – 3 July 1909) was an officer in the United States Army. The salient point in his military career occurred when he took part in the Battle of the Little Bighorn, surviving because he and his unit was not with George Armstrong Custer and the main body of the 7th Cavalry Regiment. Early on the day of battle, McDougall's Company B was assigned to escort the regiment's pack train, but the mules were not used to carrying packs and lagged far behind the other three detachments under Custer, Reno, and Benteen as they went into combat. After viewing the Indian village, and being surprised by its size, Custer sent two urgent orders to bring the mules with the ammunition packs to his detachment of five companies, but by the time these messengers reached Captain McDougall the distance between the pack train and Custer made this order difficult if not impossible to comply with, though a debate on this topic remains to this day.

== Early life and family ==
The son of Brevet Brigadier General Charles McDougall (Army Medical Corps) and Marie Hanson McDougall, he was born at Fort Crawford, near Prairie du Chien, Wisconsin. He attended St. Mary's Academy near Baltimore, MD.

He appeared on the 1860 Federal census of Cornwall, Orange County, New York, in the household of his parents Dr Charles McDougall and Maria Griffith Hanson.

McDougall married Alice Sheldon, who survived him and died in 1920. He was related by marriage to Lawrence Sprague Babbitt who also came from a prestigious military family.

== Army career prior to Little Bighorn ==
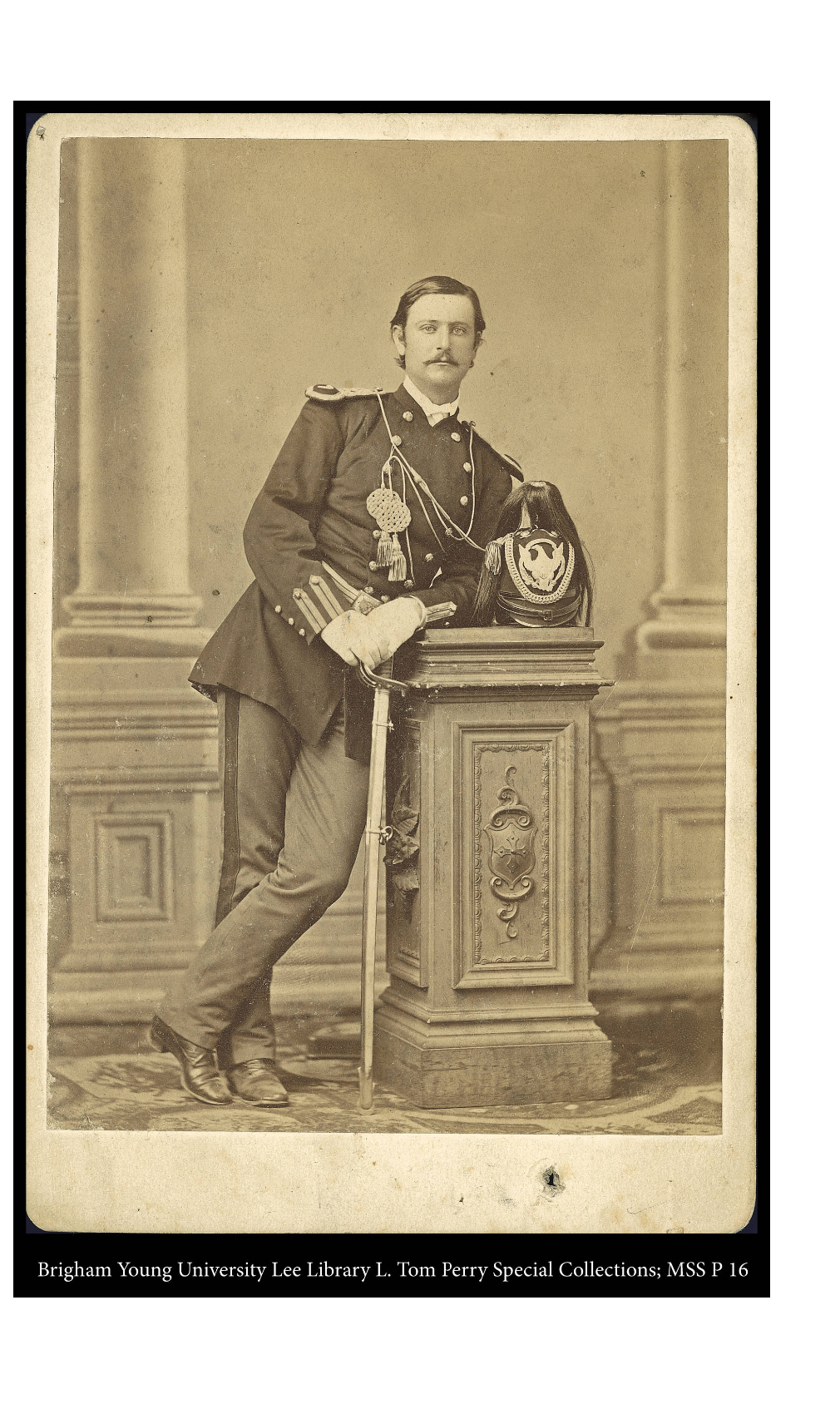
Thomas McDougall in 1876

McDougall came from an army family, and his career appears to reflect his family's army contacts. He started his army service during the Civil War. Before receiving a commission, he was with General Grant at the siege of Vicksburg in 1863 and he served without pay as a volunteer aide-de-camp to General J.P. Hawkins from October 1863 to February 1864, when only 17. From Kansas, at the age of 18 in 1864, he was appointed 2nd Lt, 10th US Louisiana Volunteers of African Descent, later redesignated as 48th US Colored Infantry. He was severely wounded in the battle of Lakeville, Louisiana. He was honorably mustered out of volunteer service on June 1, 1865, at Benton Barracks, Missouri, and the next day he was commissioned a captain, Company G, 5th US Volunteer Infantry.

While serving with the 5th U.S. Volunteer Infantry, he was in an Indian skirmish near Ellsworth Kansas, and was mustered out of service with "volunteer" forces, again, on August 10, at Fort Leavenworth, Kansas.

From civilian life, McDougall was offered a commission as second lieutenant, 14th US Infantry, May 10, 1866. He accepted the commission on July 21, 1866, at Fort Laramie. On September 21, 1866, he was transferred to the 32nd US Infantry and received promotion to first lieutenant to rank from January 14, 1867. After a brief service at Fort Vancouver and Fort Walla Walla, Washington, McDougall went to Arizona in 1867, and engaged in scouting and had fights with various bands and groups of Apache Indians at Aravipa Canyon, Tonto Basin, Point of Mountain and Rock Springs, Arizona.

During the reorganization of the Army he was transferred to the 21st US Infantry on April 19, 1869, and was unassigned on October 21, 1869. He was assigned to the 7th US Cavalry on December 30, 1870, and was stationed in South Carolina during the Ku Klux Klan troubles in that state. He married Alice M. Sheldon on May 21, 1872, in Spartanburg, SC.

After the 7th Cavalry was reassembled at Fort Abraham Lincoln, he was engaged with Sioux at the mouth of the Big Horn River, Montana August 11, 1873, when accompanying the David Stanley Yellowstone Expedition. He also was on Custer's 1874 Black Hills Expedition, Commanding Company E.

Charged with being drunk on duty, he was acquitted during a court-martial in March 1875 and subsequently he was appointed captain on December 15, 1875.

== Battle of the Little Bighorn ==
In 1876 Captain McDougall commanded Company B of the 7th Cavalry Regiment, under command of Lt. Col. George A. Custer in its fateful departure from Fort Abraham Lincoln to participate in what became known as the Great Sioux War of 1876, which culminated in the Battle of the Little Bighorn, also known as Custer's Last Stand which occurred on June 25–26, 1876.

=== Before the battle – The Dakota Column ===
On May 17, 1876, the 7th Cavalry left their base at Fort Abraham Lincoln near present day Mandan, North Dakota to join in a campaign against the Sioux Indians. The twelve companies of the 7th Cavalry Regiment, commanded by Lt. Col. Custer, were the main combat element of a larger column of soldiers, called the Dakota Column commanded by General Alfred Terry.

The Dakota Column was to meet with General John Gibbon's Montana Column at the mouth of the Powder River. On reaching the Powder River, General Terry learned from General John Gibbon that his scouts had located a large Sioux village that had been seen on lower Rosebud Creek. General Terry believed that the village had gone up the Rosebud and then over to other western drainages, but he dispatched the Seventh's "right wing" under Major Reno to scout the Powder and the Tongue to ensure that the village had not turned back east. The "right wing" consisted Companies I, E, L, F, and B Company led by "easygoing Tom McDougall". Deviating from General Terry's orders Major Reno shortened his inspection of the Powder River and the Tongue and went over to Reno Creek, where he confirmed a series of large fresh campsites from the Sioux village of some 400 plus lodges as it moved up Rosebud Creek. This information led General Terry to concentrate his troops at the mouth of Rosebud Creek, and then on June 22, 1876, to dispatch Custer with the entire 7th Cavalry Regiment up the Rosebud in pursuit of the Sioux village. On June 24, Custer learned from his Indian Scouts that the village had gone over the divide into the Little Horn Valley.

=== Morning, June 25, assigned to take charge of the pack train ===
On the early morning of the day of battle, June 25, 1876, Custer and the 7th Cavalry were on the divide between Rosebud Creek and the Little Bighorn River. From this divide, the Crow scouts had discovered indications of a large Sioux and Cheyenne village in the Valley of the Little Bighorn River at about 14–16 air miles distance. Custer divided his command into 4 groups. Colonel Custer retained five troops (C, E, F, I, and L) and assigned Major Reno three troops (A, G, and M) and these two groups proceeded down a small tributary of the Little Big Horn River (present day Reno Creek, referred to by the Sioux in 1876 as Sundance Creek) toward the Indian village in the Little Big Horn valley. Captain Benteen was also assigned three troops (H, D, and K) and sent off on a lateral path to the southwest to see if there were other Indian villages in the valley to the south.

Captain McDougall and his Troop B were assigned to guard the pack train, and they comprised the fourth group. Lt. Edward G. Mathey was the officer assigned to be in charge of the pack train and its permanent personnel, but since it had critical supplies for the column, including the column's extra ammunition, Custer ordered one troop to be detached to safeguard it. "Captain McDougall had fallen asleep prior to officer's call and had been the last to report to Adjutant Cooke. As a consequence, McDougall's B Company was assigned to guard Lieutenant Mathey's slow moving pack train." "Some of his [McDougal's] disappointed troopers, doubtful they would see any action, wept at this."

At the Reno Court of Inquiry in January 1879, McDougall testified that at about 11 a.m. on June 25, on the Divide between the Rosebud and the Little Big Horn, he was ordered by Custer to "take charge of the pack train and serve as a rear guard". When asked about the "effective force" McDougall had "with the pack train that day", McDougall replied, "My company was composed of about 45 men, and there were about 80 men belonging to the pack train, and 5 or 6 civilian packers."

Certain personnel and animals had been left with the pack train. Custer's "striker" John Burkman was left with the pack train, along with Custer's second horse Dandy and his two hounds.

=== June 25, order to bring pack train to Custer with all speed ===
On the 25th, as the other three detachments advanced down a small tributary of the Little Bighorn River called Sun Dance Creek (present day Reno Creek) toward the Sioux village in the valley, the mules of the pack train under McDougall's charge lagged behind as they usually did when the column was on the move.

Historians believe that the village was much larger than Custer had anticipated. Reno followed Custer's orders to cross the river with his three troops and made an initial attack on the south end of the village. Although the large camp appeared to be surprised by this initial contact, the Indians quickly mounted a responsive counter attack that almost immediately halted and then outflanked Reno and his troops. The troops were first driven under heavy pressure back into the timber along the river, after which they fled in a chaotic retreat out of the timber and up the steep bluffs east of the river, suffering casualties all the way. The remnants of Reno's command stopped on top of the bluffs and attempted to dig in.

Custer's five troops had approached the Indian camp by a different route than taken by Reno, which had not allowed Custer to view the valley or see the village. Custer left his five troops and rode up to the edge of the high bluffs just east of the Little Bighorn Valley and was confronted by a view of a very large Indian village. Given the village's large size, Custer's first thought was to bring up the pack train as quickly as possible with its reserve supply of ammunition...and at this point he sent Sergeant Kanipe back to McDougall with a verbal message telling him to hurry up with the ammunition. Custer returned to his troops and continued north, again behind the bluffs and out of sight from the village. When Custer rode to the edge of the bluffs again, he realized the village was even larger than first thought. Given the immense size of the village Custer realized he needed not only the pack train, but also the three troops under Captain Benteen, and he called over his trumpeter John Martin, and sent him to Benteen with a verbal as well as a written message, signed by the adjutant Lt. Cooke, which read: "Benteen, Come on, Big Village, Be Quick, bring packs, W. W. Cooke. P.S. Bring pacs(sic)". Custer and his five troops then rode off. Trumpeter Martin was the last surviving member of the 7th cavalry to see or talk with Custer.

After driving Reno from the valley, the rapidly growing force of Indian warriors coming from the now thoroughly aroused Indian village had shifted their focus to deal with the approach from the north and east by the five troops with Custer. During this lull, Reno's battered contingent on the bluffs had been joined and reinforced by Benteen's three troops.

Benteen's troops had been initially ordered by Custer to veer off to the south to look into the Little Bighorn valley and ascertain if there were other Indian villages there. After a fruitless several hours Benteen had abandoned that search and had returned to the original line of march taken by Custer and Reno to the Little Bighorn River down the course of a small tributary, Sundance Creek, (now Reno Creek), where he stopped to water the horses of his three troops at a swampy area later referred to as "the morass". Just as Benteen troops were leaving the morass, Lt McDougall came up with the pack train. The pack train mules had not had water since the evening before and when they smelled water in the boggy area of Sundance Creek they bolted and became mired for a time in "the morass". After a delay of about 20 minutes McDougall extracted the mules of his pack train from the morass on Sun Dance Creek, and was proceeding toward the Little Bighorn when he heard volleys, "a dull sound" as he later remembered, that resonated through the hills. As remembered by McDougall and others this was the beginnings of Custer's battle.

Beenteen was continuing on toward the Little Bighorn when he encountered Sergeant Kanipe, who paused only briefly, as Custer after his first glimpse of the village had directed Kanipe back to contact Captain McDougall personally and order him to bring up the pack train and the extra ammunition with all speed. Kanipe continued on and met McDougall about 4 miles further down Sundance Creek from the morass. The pack train stopped again to allow the strung out mules to close ranks, and then resumed the trail in better order, but "still at little better than a walk".

Benteen then encountered the Custer's second messenger, Trumpeter John Martin with the written order for Benteen himself, to "Come on, Big Village, Be Quick, bring packs". After a conference with his officers, Benteen pocketed this message and ordered Martin to find McDougall and tell him of the order. Martin complied and found McDougall a short distance behind Benteen. He was riding out in front of the pack train, The pack train at this point was "pretty well together. Trumpeter said, "Capt. Benteen sent his compliments and wanted him to hurry up the packs and not to get too far behind, and to keep them well closed up." McDougall then acted to close up with Benteen, moving more quickly at a trot down Sun Dance Creek and after a delay arrived at Reno's position on the bluffs.

At Reno Hill, Reno and Benteen conferred, and after a delay of about 20 minutes Reno and Benteen sent Lt. Hare on a run back to McDougall and the pack train to hurry up the ammunition. Packers Churchill and Mann cut out two of these animals and drove them ahead of the pack train to Reno Hill. The rest of the train arrived in the next half hour, to learn that Custer's battalion was somewhere to the north.

=== June 25, McDougall joins Reno in his entrenchment and passes under his command ===
When McDougall arrived at the area where Reno and Benteen were located, he passed under the orders of Major Reno. He took part in an advance to the north to Weir Point, but then retreated with the unit back to Reno's original position, where they were attacked by large contingents of Sioux Indians returning from wiping out Custer and his five troops. McDougall's troop and the pack train remained under attack along with Reno and Benteen's troops on the bluffs overlooking the Little Bighorn valley throughout the rest of June 25, and until the late afternoon of the 26th when the Indian warriors withdrew and the Indian village in the valley packed up and moved south, going up the Little Bighorn valley. The movement of the Indians was in response to the advance of General Gibbons on June 26 up the Little Bighorn valley with additional infantry and cavalry units. During the night of June 26, McDougall with two enlisted men recovered the body of Lieutenant Hodgson who had fallen in the valley fight and buried it on Reno Hill.

On June 27 Col. Gibbon arrived at the site of the battle with infantry reinforcements, and relieved the 7th Cavalry troops under Major Reno and Captain Benteen. It was then discovered that several miles north of the Reno entrenchments, the five troops with Custer had been surrounded and wiped out to the last man.

== Later career ==
In 1877, the year after the Battle of the Little Bighorn, McDougall was engaged with the 7th cavalry in scouting in Montana during the Nez Perce troubles in 1877, and commanded part of the escort for the surrendered Chief Joseph and his people from Bear Paw Mountain, Montana, to Fort Abraham Lincoln, Dakota.

McDougall remained in the army and in the 7th Cavalry Regiment, being posted in Montana and Dakota Territory until 1880 after which he was transferred to Dakota in 1882, being finally retired for disability in the line of duty on July 22, 1890. He appeared on the 1880 Federal census of Billings, Custer County, Montana Territory, enumerated 12 June 1880.

For his Civil War service, he was promoted to major of cavalry (retired) on May 24, 1904, to rank from April 23, 1904.

== Comment in 1897 letter from Captain Benteen ==
From Benteen's letter of March 29, 1897, to photographer D.F. Barry regarding Capt. McDougall:

Where is Tom McDougall now? I rather think that Washington—with its thousands of Army visitors—was too hot a place for Tom to make a permanent residence, as good fellow that he is, with a long practice of making astronomical observations thro' the bottom of a tumbler. It is almost an impossible place to correct such a habit. The last letter I had from Tom—which was long ago—he said he hadn't had a drink for—well, I can't say how long, but an almost impossible number of months.

== Death and burial ==
Major McDougall died on July 3, 1909, in Brandon, Vermont. Prior to his death, he and his wife had been living in Wellsville, New York, with the Cummins family, related to the mother of Major McDougall's wife. Although his health had been poor, on Saturday, July 3, he and his wife Alice took a train from Wellsville, New York, to stay at a summer resort, Echo Lake Farm, 6 miles (9.7 km) from Brandon, Vermont, occupying a cottage there. Arriving late in the day, and fatigued by the long train journey, he retired early. At just after 10 p.m. he awoke his wife Alice and reported that he was having difficulty in breathing, and that it was serious. His wife went to the main house to arouse the proprietor, who sent for the local doctor, but at 10:45 p.m.. Major McDougall passed away. He was 64 years of age. McDougall and his wife Alice are buried at Arlington National Cemetery, in Arlington, Virginia.
