= William Burnham =

William Burnham may refer to:

- William H. Burnham (1855–1941), American educational psychologist
- William P. Burnham (1860–1930), United States Army general
- William Addison Burnham, co-founder of Lord & Burnham, American boiler and greenhouse manufacturer
- Willie Burnham (fl. 1930–1934), American baseball player
