= Sixth Corps Area =

Military district of the United States Army from 1921 to the 1940s

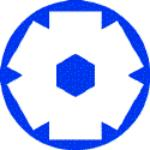
- Active: 20 August 1920-7 December 1941
- Country: United States of America
- Branch: United States Army
- Type: Military District
- Role: Training
- Part of: Department of War
- Garrison/HQ: Fort Sheridan, Illinois; Chicago, Illinois

Sixth Corps Area was a Corps area, effectively a military district, of the United States Army from 20 August 1920 to 7 December 1941. The headquarters was established at Fort Sheridan, Illinois, in August 1920, from portions of the former Central Department, but then moved to the U.S. Post Office Building at 1819 West Pershing Road in Chicago on 10 October 1921.

The corps area covered the states of Wisconsin, Michigan and Illinois and Jefferson Barracks, Missouri. It was responsible for the mobilization, administration, and training of units of the Second and Fifth Armies, I Cavalry Corps (Regular Army, but inactive, 1927-1940), VI Army Corps (6th Division, 32d Division and 33rd Division) and XVI Army Corps (85th Division, 86th Division, 101st Division), select GHQ Reserve units, the Zone of the Interior support units of the Sixth Corps Area Support Command, and 21st Airship Group at Scott Field, Illinois (12 August 1936-19 February 1939). 2d Balloon Squadron was assigned to Sixth Corps Area from 20 May 1930 - 30 December 1940.

The Sixth Corps Area Training Center was established at Fort Sheridan, Illinois 20 December 1921 and was later moved to Camp Custer, Michigan until 17 August 1922. The training area was responsible for annual summer training of regular army, organized reserves, R.O.T.C. and the C.M.T.C.

On 24 March 1923, the 21st Aero Squadron was reconstituted as the 21st Observation Squadron of the United States Army Air Service. The Army activated the unit as a "Regular Army Inactive" squadron, meaning that although it was a Regular Army unit, it was manned with reserve personnel. It was assigned to the 9th Observation Group in the Sixth Corps Area. The 21st's designated Active Associate unit was the 15th Observation Squadron, at Chanute Field, Illinois, which was also its designated mobilization station.

In 1927 it was withdrawn from the Sixth Corps Area and reassigned to the Fourth Corps Area.

Major active duty installations in the corps area included Fort Brady, Chanute Field, Camp Custer, Jefferson Barracks, Scott Field, Fort Sheridan, and Fort Wayne. Camp Douglas and Camp Grant were among the National Guard installations.

After World War II began turning against the Axis, prisoners of war began arriving in the United States. "The responsibility of medical care for prisoners of war fell mainly upon the surgeons' offices of the Second, Fourth, Sixth, and Seventh Service Commands, since prisoner-of-war camps were concentrated in these areas. Surgeons of the service commands along the coast cooperated with medical men of the Navy and the Coast Guard, as well as with Army port surgeons, in attempting to maintain sanitary conditions in coastal areas and in receiving Army and prisoner-of-war patients evacuated from overseas."

One of the prison camps was Camp Ellis, between the towns of Bernadotte, Ipava, and Table Grove in Fulton County, Illinois.

"In the First and Sixth Service Commands, pigeons were located at a number of airbases and fields."

Lieutenant General (AUS) Walton Walker was assigned as the commander of the succeeding Sixth Service Command and the Fifth Army, headquartered in Chicago, from May 1946 to September 1948. He was then sent to Japan.

== Commanders ==
Sixth Corps Area

- Major General Leonard Wood 20 August 1920–2 April 1921
- Major General George Bell Jr. 2 April 1921–3 October 1922
- Brigadier General George V. H. Moseley 3 October 1922–2 December 1922
- Major General Harry Clay Hale 2 December 1922–10 July 1925
- Major General William S. Graves 12 July 1925–25 October 1926
- Brigadier General Michael J. Lenihan 25 October 1926–9 March 1927
- Major General William Lassiter 9 March 1927–17 March 1928
- Major General Paul B. Malone 17 March 1928–6 April 1929
- Major General Frank Parker 7 April 1929–1 November 1933
- Major General Preston Brown 22 October 1933–16 October 1934
- Brigadier General Frank C. Bolles 16 October 1934–1 February 1935
- Major General Frank Ross McCoy 1 February 1935–1 May 1936
- Major General Johnson Hagood 2 May 1936–7 May 1936
- Brigadier General Dana T. Merrill 7 May 1936–14 May 1936
- Brigadier General Charles D. Herron 14 May 1936–1 June 1936
- Major General Charles E. Kilbourne Jr. 1 June 1936–17 December 1936
- Major General Charles D. Herron 17 December 1936–15 September 1937
- Major General Hugh Drum 15 September 1937–31 October 1938
- Major General Stanley H. Ford 5 November 1938–10 October 1940

Sixth Corps Area Support Command

- Major General Charles Hartwell Bonesteel Jr. 10 October 1940–26 July 1941
- Major General Joseph M. Cummins 26 July 1941–28 March 1942

Sixth Support Command

- Major General George Grunert (until September 1942)
- Major General Henry Aurand (until November 1944)
- Major General Russell Reynolds (until 23 May 1945)
- Major General David McCoach Jr. 23 May 1945 – 1 January 1946

== Sources ==
- Clay, Steven E. (2010). US Army Order of Battle 1919–1941 (PDF). Vol. 1: The Arms: Major Commands and Infantry Organizations. Fort Leavenworth, KS: Combat Studies Institute Press.
- Gutheim, Frederick Albert (1976). Planning Washington, 1924-1976: An Era of Planning for the National Capital and Environs. Washington, DC: National Capital Planning Commission – via Google Books.
- Maurer, Maurer, ed. (1982) [1969]. Combat Squadrons of the Air Force, World War II (PDF) (reprint ed.). Washington, DC: Office of Air Force History. ISBN 0-405-12194-6. LCCN 70605402. OCLC 72556. Archived from the original (PDF) on December 20, 2016.
- Millett, John D. (1954). The Organization and Role of the Army Service Forces. Washington, D.C.: Office of the Chief of Military History, Department of the Army. OCLC 631289493. Archived from the original on June 20, 2008.
