= 165th Brigade =

165th Brigade may refer to:

- 165th (Liverpool) Brigade, United Kingdom
- 165th Infantry Brigade (United States)

== See also ==
- 165th Regiment (disambiguation)
