= Harry A. "Paddy" Flint =

Harry Albert Flint
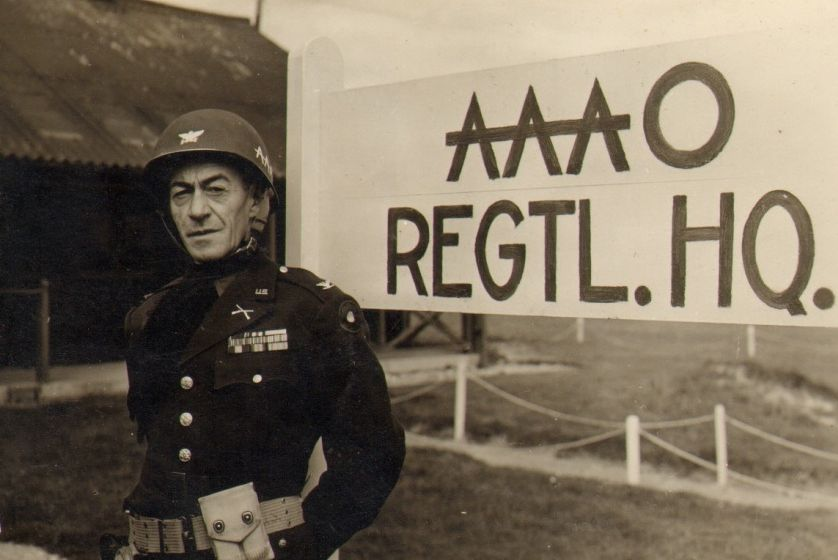
- Flint at the headquarters of the 39th Infantry Regiment
- Born: February 12, 1888; St. Johnsbury, Vermont, United States
- Died: July 24, 1944 (aged 56) near Saint-Lô, France
- Burial place: Arlington National Cemetery, Virginia, United States
- Military career
- Allegiance: United States
- Branch: United States Army
- Service years: 1912–1944
- Rank: Colonel
- Nickname: "Paddy"
- Service number: 0-3377
- Units: Cavalry Branch; Field Artillery Branch
- Commands: 56th Armored Infantry Regiment; 39th Infantry Regiment
- Conflicts: World War I World War II: Operation Torch; Invasion of Sicily; Operation Overlord
- Awards: Distinguished Service Cross (2); Silver Star (3); Legion of Merit; Purple Heart

Colonel Harry Albert "Paddy" Flint (February 12, 1888 – July 24, 1944) was an officer of the United States Army who served with distinction during World War II. Although at 56 years of age he was considered older than what was acceptable for field-grade front-line infantry officers, he is most known for leading the 39th Infantry Regiment from its service in Sicily from July 1943 until he was mortally wounded six weeks after the Normandy landings in June 1944.

== Early life ==
Harry Albert Flint was born in St. Johnsbury, Vermont, on February 12, 1888, the third of seven children born to Mabel and Charles G. Flint. Inspired by stories of returning veterans of the Spanish–American War, by age 11 he was decided upon a military career.

Flint was educated in St. Johnsbury, and graduated from St. Johnsbury Academy in 1907. He took the entrance examination for the United States Military Academy and scored well, but there were no vacancies, so he did not receive an appointment. He attended Norwich University for six months in preparation to enter West Point, and in May 1907 he was appointed to the United States Naval Academy. He attended the Naval Academy until March 1908, when he received an appointment to West Point.

Flint graduated from West Point in 1912 ranked 41 of 95. He received his commission as a second lieutenant of Cavalry was assigned to the 4th Cavalry Regiment.

== Start of career ==
Flint served initially with the 4th Cavalry at Schofield Barracks, Hawaii and in Manila, Philippines. During the Pancho Villa Expedition of 1916, Flint was stationed at Fort Riley, Kansas, and his request for service on the border with Mexico was turned down. When it appeared that the United States would enter World War I in 1917, Flint transferred to the Field Artillery, hoping this would facilitate an assignment to a combat unit.

== World War I ==
Flint served in France during World War I, and his regiment provided replacement soldiers for units on the front lines. After the war was brought to an end due to the Armistice with Germany on November 11, 1918, he joined the Third Army—the Army of Occupation—in Koblenz, Germany. Flint performed several staff assignments, including employing his cavalry background to serve as a remount officer. He received the Czechoslovak War Cross 1918 from a grateful Czech government, which appreciated his honesty when buying and selling horses. Flint was also commended by his commander after he prevented the detonation of a trainload of high explosives during a fire at an ammunition dump by taking over the controls of a switch engine and maneuvering the train through the flames to safety.

== Post-World War I ==
Flint returned to the United States in 1921, and his post-war assignments included: instructor at the U.S. Army Cavalry School; attendance at the General Service School and the U.S. Army Command and General Staff College from July 1923 to June 1924, and professor of military science at the New Mexico Military Institute. He attended Ecole Supérieure de Guerre in Paris and became fluent in French. Flint also performed staff duty on the office of the Chief of Cavalry and at the Air Corps Tactical School. After serving with the 1st Cavalry Regiment at Fort Knox, Kentucky from 1933 to 1935, he was promoted to lieutenant colonel as head of the Reserve Officers’ Training Corps (ROTC) program at the University of Illinois. From 1939 to 1941, Flint served with the 5th Cavalry Regiment. The last month of 1941 saw the United States officially enter World War II.

== World War II ==
Assigned to the 2nd Armored Division, Flint commanded the 56th Armored Infantry Regiment, for which he received the Legion of Merit. Later assigned to the U.S. II Corps, Flint took part in the Allied invasion of French North Africa (Operation Torch) as part of the corps G-3 (operations and training) staff and as a liaison officer to the French headquarters in Algiers. For his service with the French, Flint received the Legion of Honor (Chevalier).

Hoping for a combat assignment despite his advanced age, Flint approached the new II Corps commander, Major General Omar Bradley directly in April 1943, shortly before the Allied invasion of Sicily (Operation Husky) and requested combat duty. Soon afterwards, Flint was assigned as commander of the Headquarters Detachment of the 2nd Armored Division.

=== 39th Infantry Regiment ===
In mid-July 1943, Flint was appointed to command the 39th Infantry Regiment while fighting was still ongoing in Sicily. The 39th Infantry had previously fought in North Africa, and had sustained numerous casualties. In addition, the previous regimental commander had to be evacuated after breaking his leg in an accident. The regiment was a unit of the 9th Infantry Division; when the division commander, Major General Manton S. Eddy, requested a new commander for the 39th, Bradley recommended Flint, and Eddy accepted. Flint took immediate steps to restore the regiment's morale and fighting spirit. He gained notoriety for some activities, with Lieutenant General George S. Patton, commander of the American Seventh Army (which controlled all American ground forces for the campaign), commenting at one point that "Paddy Flint is clearly nuts, but he fights well." In a letter to his wife Beatrice, written on June 17, 1944, Patton wrote, prophetically: "Paddy is in and took a town. He expects to be killed and probably will be."

Flint led his regiment during continued fighting in Sicily, including the Battle of Troina, for which he received the Distinguished Service Cross. The citation for the medal reads:

The President of the United States of America, authorized by Act of Congress July 9, 1918, takes pleasure in presenting the Distinguished Service Cross to Colonel (Cavalry) Harry Albert Flint (ASN: 0-3377), United States Army, for extraordinary heroism in connection with military operations against an armed enemy while serving as Commanding Officer, 39th Infantry Regiment, 9th Infantry Division, in action against enemy forces in August 1943 near Troina, Sicily. Going forward with the attacking battalions, Colonel Flint spent his entire days moving about the squad and platoon installations to cheer and encourage all ranks. During the attack on 4 August 1943 he personally led the advance through enemy fire, waving to his men to follow him forward. He was often covered and obscured from view by dust and smoke from bursting shells, later to be revealed as standing upright and urging the men forward. Colonel Flint's outstanding leadership, personal bravery and zealous devotion to duty exemplify the highest traditions of the military forces of the United States and reflect great credit upon himself, his unit, and the United States Army.

=== AAA-O ===
The 39th Infantry Regiment's slogan, "Anything, Anytime, Anywhere - Bar Nothing", also known as the Triple-A Bar Nothing slogan, was given to the regiment by Colonel Flint. This slogan, in which the regiment took great pride, was displayed on their helmets and vehicles, even in combat. Using such readily identifiable markings was against orders, as they could give the enemy valuable intelligence as to the units and leaders they faced in battle, but Flint disregarded the risk, declaring, "The enemy who sees our regiment in combat, if they live through the battle, will know to run the next time they see us coming." When Flint received command of the regiment it was somewhat of a lackluster outfit, but his enthusiasm, coupled with the slogan, helped to turn it around.

The best example of useful gimmickry during World War II was the "AAA-O" of Paddy Flint. When Colonel Flint assumed command of the 39th Infantry in Sicily in 1943, it was not a good fighting outfit. Paddy immediately had "AAA-O" stenciled on the helmet of every man in the regiment. When questioned by his corps commander, who had issued orders against such stenciling on helmets, Paddy explained, "That means anything, anywhere, any time bar nothing." It was so-explained by Bradley in his autobiography, A Soldier's Story, but junior officers in the 39th, said they could lick, "Anybody, anyplace, any time bar none." Regardless of the version, it worked, and Flint made the 39th one of the best-fighting outfits in Europe.

The AAA-O slogan also showed up in a strange stamp cancellation that had some people wondering what on earth it meant. Apparently, Paddy's 39th Infantry had so impressed the German forces that they used the unit's slogan/logo on a pseudo-cancellation on a propaganda postage stamp. An article by Jerry Jensen,, explains the story.

=== Normandy invasion ===
The 9th Division, of which Flint's 39th Infantry Regiment formed an integral part, took no part in the fighting in Italy which followed in the wake of the campaign in Sicily, and was instead withdrawn to the United Kingdom to prepare for the Allied invasion of Normandy, then scheduled for the spring of 1944. Flint continued to command his regiment throughout this period of no action and in the fighting in Normandy after arriving on Utah Beach on 10 June 1944, four days after the Normandy landings began. He became known for his "lead from the front" style and fearless demeanor; he was thrice awarded the Silver Star for heroism in France.

On July 23, 1944, the 39th Infantry was advancing on the Saint-Lô-Périers road when it was held up by heavy mortar fire. Leading from his customary place on the front, Flint and a rifle patrol soon discovered a German pillbox. Flint reported the location by radio and called for tank support. When the tank arrived, Flint rode atop it as it sprayed the hedgerows with machine gun fire. After the tank driver was wounded, Flint dismounted and continued to advance with the rifle patrol.

=== Death and burial ===
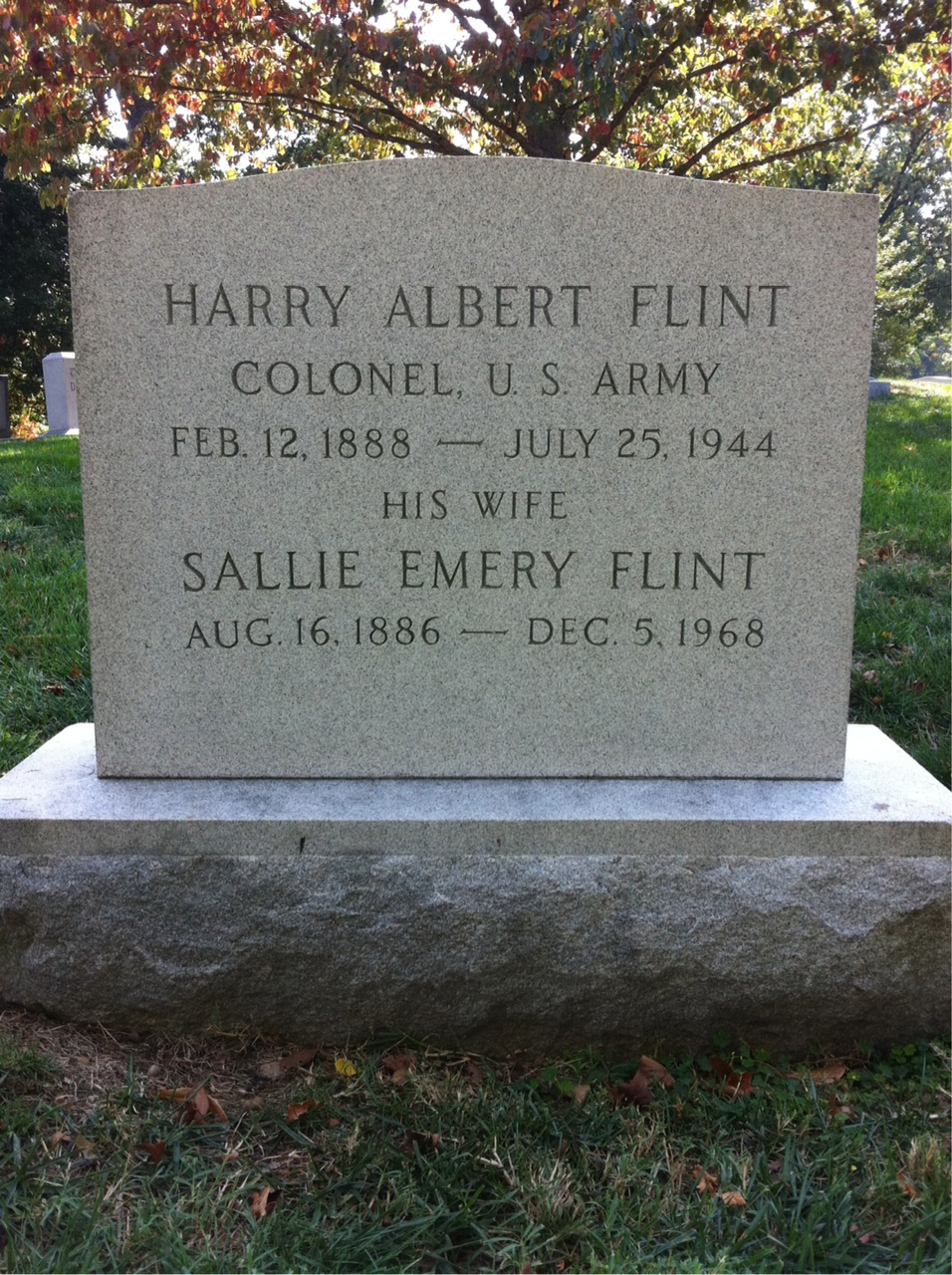
The grave of Colonel Harry A. "Paddy" Flint at Arlington National Cemetery

Flint was hit by a sniper's bullet as led the patrol into the shelter of a farmhouse during the fighting on the Saint-Lô-Périers road. Medical aid men and stretcher bearers evacuated him to a treatment area behind the lines, where Flint died the following day. He was buried at United States Military Cemetery No. 2 in Ste-Mere-Eglise, France. In 1948, Flint was reinterred at Section 2, Site 310 of Arlington National Cemetery. For the action in which he was killed, Flint received a second award of the DSC, the citation for which reads:

The President of the United States of America, authorized by Act of Congress July 9, 1918, takes pride in presenting a Bronze Oak Leaf Cluster in lieu of a Second Award of the Distinguished Service Cross (Posthumously) to Colonel (Cavalry) Harry Albert Flint (ASN: 0-3377), United States Army, for extraordinary heroism in connection with military operations against an armed enemy while serving as Commanding Officer, 39th Infantry Regiment, 9th Infantry Division, in action against enemy forces during the invasion of Normandy, France, on 23 July 1944. While advancing on the Saint-Lô-Périers road, Colonel Flint's regiment was held up by heavy mortar fire. Leading from the front, Colonel Fling and a rifle patrol soon found the source of enemy fire. He reported by radio over the walkie-talkie: "Have spotted pillbox. Will start them cooking." Calling for a tank, he rode atop it in a rain of fire as it sprayed the hedgerows. During the attack, the tank driver was wounded, stopping it, whereupon Colonel Flint crawled down, and went forward on foot with his men. As he led the patrol into the shelter of a farmhouse he was hit by a sniper's bullet. He died of his wounds the following day. Colonel Flint's outstanding leadership, personal bravery and zealous devotion to duty at the cost of his life, exemplify the highest traditions of the military forces of the United States and reflect great credit upon himself, the 9th Infantry Division, and the United States Army.

== Family ==
In August 1912, Flint married Sallie Helena Emery of Chelsea, Vermont, whom he met while both were students at St. Johnsbury Academy. They were the parents of a daughter, Sallie.
