= Charles E. Kilbourne Sr. =

United States Army officer (1844–1903)

Charles E. Kilbourne Sr. (January 17, 1844 – November 30, 1903) was a career United States Army officer who served in the Union Army during the American Civil War and attained the regular rank of major and brevet rank of colonel. He was the father of Charles E. Kilbourne.

== Biography ==
Charles E. Kilbourne was the grandson of Colonel James Kilbourne, who led the first party of settlers from Connecticut to Ohio and who was Ohio's first representative in Congress, and the son of Lincoln Kilbourne, a prominent businessman in Columbus, Ohio. Charles E. Kilbourne was born on January 17, 1844, and received his early education in the schools of his home city and later, for a time, at Kenyon College. At the outbreak of the American Civil War he enlisted for brief service as private in the local company of Ohio Reserve Militia, was soon thereafter selected by Samuel S. Cox, member of Congress, to represent the district at the National Military Academy, and in June 1862, with some 60 young men from the states not regarded as being "in rebellion," began the toilsome climb to a commission with the class of '66.

Life at West Point in the war days had little that was rejoiceful. Only 39 of the original entries in June and September 1862 were so fortunate as to receive the coveted diploma in 1866. Kilbourne served contentedly as a private in the battalion of cadets until well along in his first class year before being rewarded with a sign of a chevron. Graduating well in the upper half of the class, always a studious and solid man, Kilbourne was assigned to the Second Artillery, and, at the close of his three months' leave, started, via Panama, to report for duty at the Presidio of San Francisco.

On the Pacific Coast and around San Francisco Bay he spent, so far as professional matters were concerned, three uneventful years. Then in 1869, the Artillery School at Fortress Monroe in Virginia was reestablished and Kilbourne was ordered there as a member of a class with many members who would later become distinguished. In June 1870, he finished the course as an honor graduate. Returning for a time to the Pacific, he was ordered in the fall of 1871 to duty in the Signal Department and Weather Bureau in Washington, D.C. He soon was assigned as instructor in practical signaling at what was then Fort Whipple (later Fort Myer, Virginia), where five years were spent, followed by seven years in the Weather Bureau. In 1883, on his own application, he rejoined his regiment. From 1886 to 1890 he was Professor of Military Science and Tactics at the State University of Ohio; he was commissioned Captain in the Signal Corps, December 20, 1890, having done duty nearly a quarter of a century as a subaltern. After three years more in the Signal Office, he was commissioned Major and Paymaster in November 1893.

In the onerous, if uneventful, duties of this office he served at Chicago, Santa Fe, Walla Walla, and was on duty in Oregon at the outbreak of the Spanish–American War. He was immediately ordered to join the expedition to the Philippines, and sailed on June 29, 1898, accompanying Major General Wesley Merritt on the USS Newport. In October 1898 he was appointed Auditor of Public Accounts and Treasurer and Custodian of Public Funds, stationed at Manila. In this capacity he served to September 20, 1899, when announced as Treasurer of the U.S. Funds for the Philippine Archipelago and the Island of Guam. Eighteen months in the old walled city and that trying climate–months of incessant care and responsibility–told heavily on his health, and he was invalided home. Believing, however, that strength would return after a sea voyage and restoration to the shores of California, Kilbourne took no leave, but reported for duty on reaching San Francisco. He was soon thereafter ordered to Saint Paul, Minnesota, as Chief Paymaster, Department of the Dakotas, and there, though with ebbing strength and in constant suffering, missed no day at his desk until sent to hospital for treatment in July 1903. Then, all too late, it was found that, to prolong his life, operations of a critical character were necessary.

Kilbourne suffered for four more months, until, possibly guessing that his death was imminent, he asked to be taken to his old home. Only halfway through the journey, he died at the age of 59 on the morning of November 30, 1903, on a train near Milwaukee, Wisconsin, passing the shores of Lake Michigan. Kilbourne's wife, his eldest son and his daughter were present at his death.

== Personal life ==
During his earliest years as an officer, Kilbourne married Ada Coolidge of San Francisco, with whom he had three sons and one daughter. Two of his sons followed him into the Army. One of them, Charles E. Kilbourne Jr., joined his father in Manila during the Spanish–American War as a lieutenant in the Signal Corps. For gallantry at Paco Bridge on February 5, 1899, the younger Charles Kilbourne received the Medal of Honor. He would also receive the Distinguished Service Cross and Distinguished Service Medal later in his career.
