= Edward A. DeVore Jr. =

Edward Allen DeVore Jr.
- Medal of Honor
- Born: June 15, 1947; Torrance, California, US
- Died: March 18, 1968 (aged 20) near Saigon, Republic of Vietnam
- Military career
- Allegiance: United States
- Branch: United States Army
- Service years: 1966–1968
- Rank: Specialist Four
- Units: Company B, 4th Battalion, 39th Infantry Regiment, 9th Infantry Division
- Conflicts: Vietnam War †
- Awards: Medal of Honor; Purple Heart

Edward Allen DeVore Jr. (June 15, 1947 – March 18, 1968) was a United States Army soldier and a recipient of the United States military's highest decoration—the Medal of Honor—for his actions in the Vietnam War.

== Biography ==
DeVore joined the Army from Harbor City, California in 1966, and by March 17, 1968, was serving as a Specialist 4th Class in Company B, 4th Battalion, 39th Infantry Regiment, 9th Infantry Division. During a firefight on that day, near Saigon in the Republic of Vietnam, he single-handedly attacked an enemy position which had pinned down his squad, drawing fire to himself and allowing his comrades to retreat to safety. DeVore was mortally wounded in the assault and died the next day. He was posthumously awarded the Medal of Honor for his actions.

== Medal of Honor citation ==
Specialist DeVore's official Medal of Honor citation reads:

For conspicuous gallantry and intrepidity in action at the risk of his life above and beyond the call of duty. Sp4c. DeVore, distinguished himself by exceptionally valorous actions on the afternoon of 17 March 1968, while serving as a machine gunner with Company B, on a reconnaissance-in-force mission approximately 5 kilometers south of Saigon. Sp4c. DeVore's platoon, the company's lead element, abruptly came under intense fire from automatic weapons, Claymore mines, rockets and grenades from well-concealed bunkers in a nipa palm swamp. One man was killed and 3 wounded about 20 meters from the bunker complex. Sp4c. DeVore raced through a hail of fire to provide a base of fire with his machine gun, enabling the point element to move the wounded back to friendly lines. After supporting artillery, gunships and air strikes had been employed on the enemy positions, a squad was sent forward to retrieve their fallen comrades. Intense enemy frontal and enfilading automatic weapons fire pinned down this element in the kill zone. With complete disregard for his personal safety, Sp4c. DeVore assaulted the enemy positions. Hit in the shoulder and knocked down about 35 meters short of his objectives, Sp4c. DeVore, ignoring his pain and the warnings of his fellow soldiers, jumped to his feet and continued his assault under intense hostile fire. Although mortally wounded during this advance, he continued to place highly accurate suppressive fire upon the entrenched insurgents. By drawing the enemy fire upon himself, Sp4c. DeVore enabled the trapped squad to rejoin the platoon in safety. Sp4c. DeVore's extraordinary heroism and devotion to duty in close combat were in keeping with the highest traditions of the military service and reflect great credit upon himself, the 39th Infantry, and the U.S. Army.

== See also ==
- List of Medal of Honor recipients for the Vietnam War
