= Camp MacArthur =

US military training base in Texas during World War I

Camp MacArthur (or Camp McArthur) was an American military training base in Waco, Texas, during World War I. It was named for Lieutenant General Arthur MacArthur Jr. on July 18, 1917.

== Location ==
Camp MacArthur was located on a 10,699-acre tract of land in northwest Waco, Texas. On March 7, 1919, the camp closed and the land was encompassed into the city of Waco.

== History ==
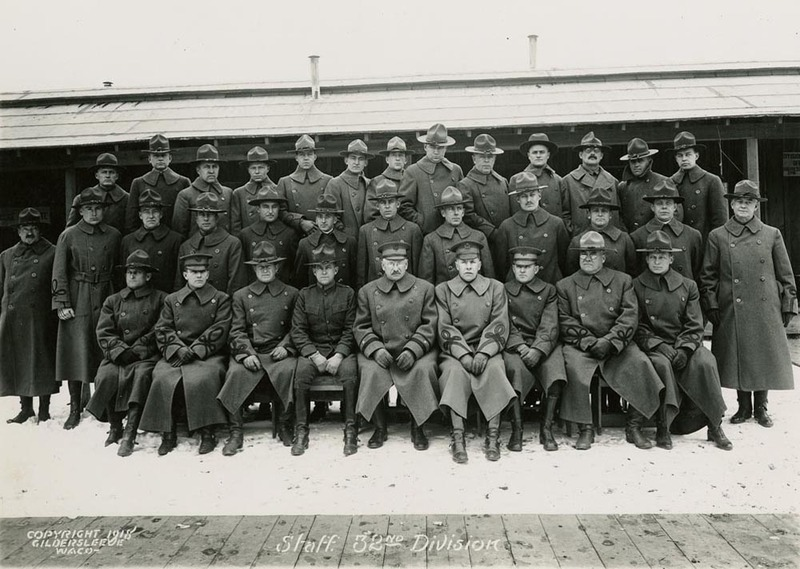
Major General William G. Haan, commanding the 32nd Division, along with members of his divisional staff at Camp MacArthur, January 1918.

Shortly after the United States declared war on Germany in 1917, Waco was chosen as a site for a military training camp. 10,700 acres of cotton fields and black land farms were chosen as the site for construction. Camp MacArthur began its $5 million construction on July 20, 1917.

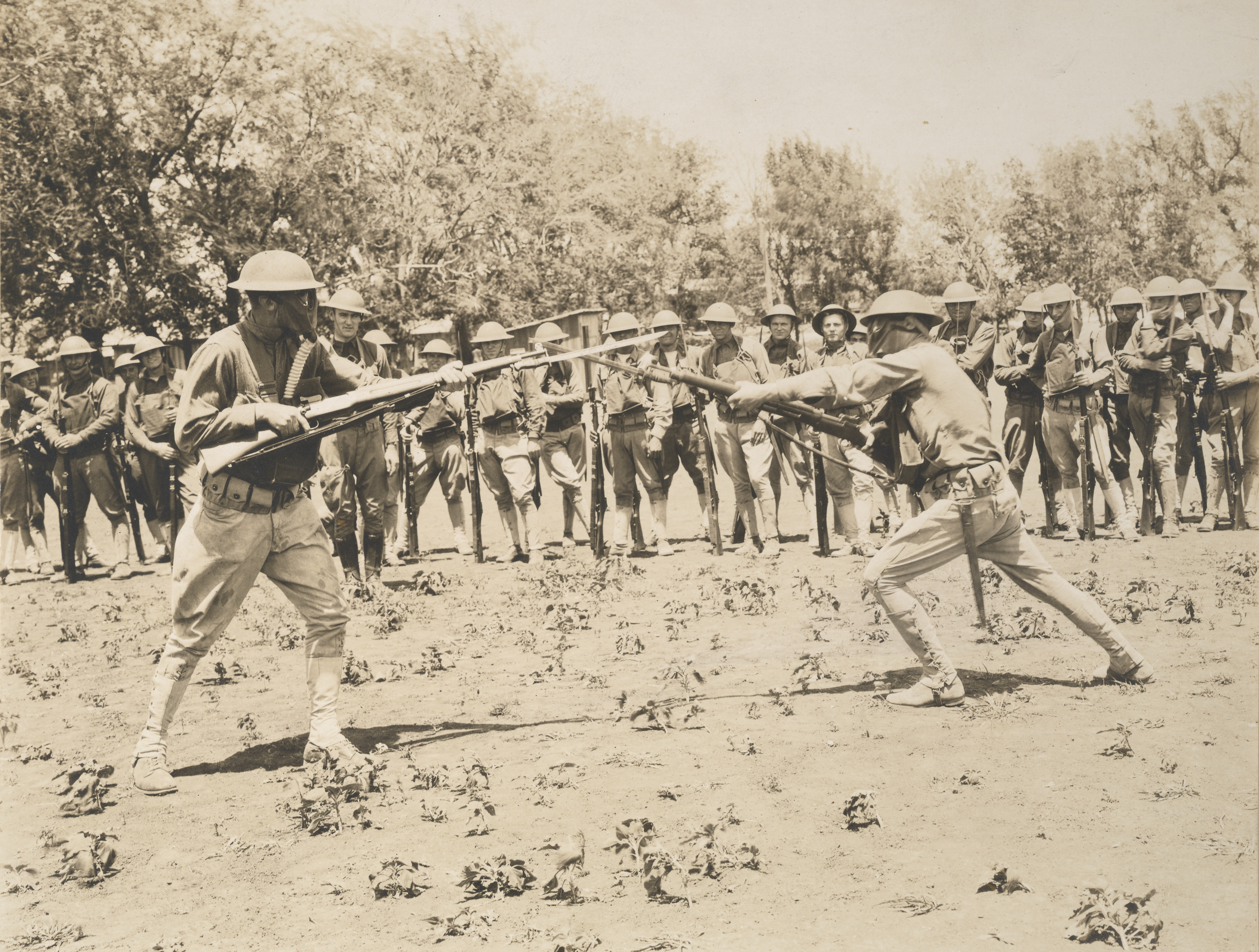
Doughboys of the 56th Infantry Regiment during bayonet practice at Camp MacArthur, Waco, Texas, July 17, 1918.

The cite was named for Lieutenant General Arthur MacArthur who was a Medal of Honor recipient and fought in two American wars. In September 1917, 18,000 troops arrived at Camp MacArthur. Most of those soldiers were from Wisconsin and Michigan, so their arrival boosted the Waco population. Even though Camp MacArthur was built to hold about 45,000 troops, no more than 28,000 ever lived inside the compound.

Within the camp was an officer's training school, demobilization facility, and an infantry replacement and training camp, as well as a hospital, administrative offices, and a tent camp. Loretta Johnston, who was a nurse at Camp MacArthur, wrote of the hospital. She described it as "very pleasing to the eye" and a "pleasant place for [the] sick and convalescent soldiers. The Thirty-Second (Red Arrow) division based at Camp MacArthur participated in combat in France in 1918. Between 1917 and 1919, 45,074 soldiers were stationed at Camp MacArthur, nearly doubling the town's population and boosting the area's wartime economy. After the close of the camp, some of its materials were used to build United States-Mexican border stations. After the War's conclusion, many soldiers returned to Waco. Some of the materials were used to build neighborhoods in Waco.
