= Scott Field Historic District =

Historic district in Illinois, United States

- U.S. National Register of Historic Places
- U.S. Historic district
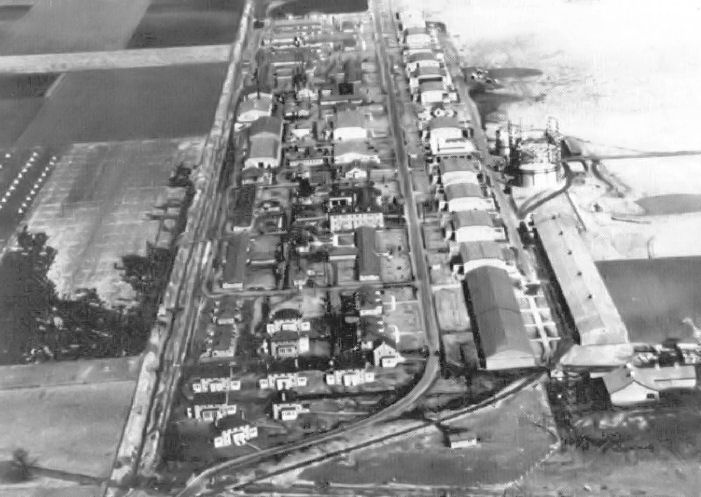
- The field in 1930, in the area of the present day Historic District

- Location within Illinois Location within the United States
- Nearest city: O'Fallon, Illinois
- Coordinates: 38°32′22″N 89°51′46″W
- Area: 85 acres (34 ha)
- Architectural style: Colonial Revival, Classical Revival, Art Deco
- NRHP reference No.: 94000060
- Added to NRHP: March 10, 1994

Scott Field Historic District began as a World War I era air base built in 1917 near O'Fallon, Illinois, and was expanded and rebuilt before World War II. The district contains primarily that portion of the base built prior to 1941, and is now contained within the renamed, expanded, and operational Scott Air Force Base. The district boundaries include 107 contributing buildings and structures, and exclude post-1945 buildings built in the areas surrounding the 1917 Main Base area.

Scott Field was named after Corporal Frank S. Scott, the first enlisted member of the United States Armed Forces to die in an aircraft accident.

The district was listed on the National Register of Historic Places in 1994.

Airship Hangar Illustrations at Scott Field
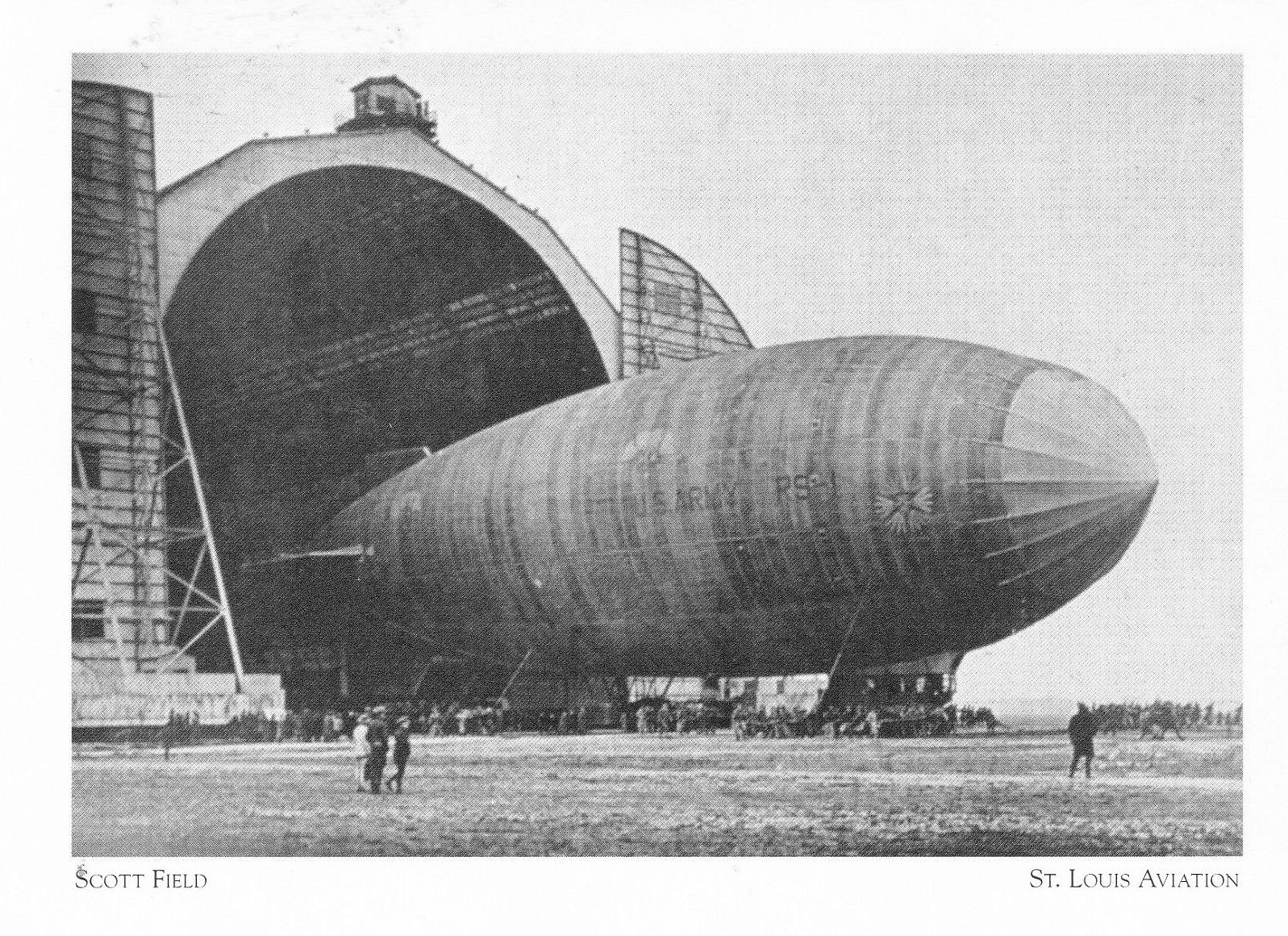
Dirigible Exiting Hangar at Scott Field in 1922

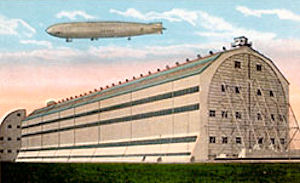
Postcard of Lighter-Than-Air Dirigible Hangar, Scott Field, Illinois

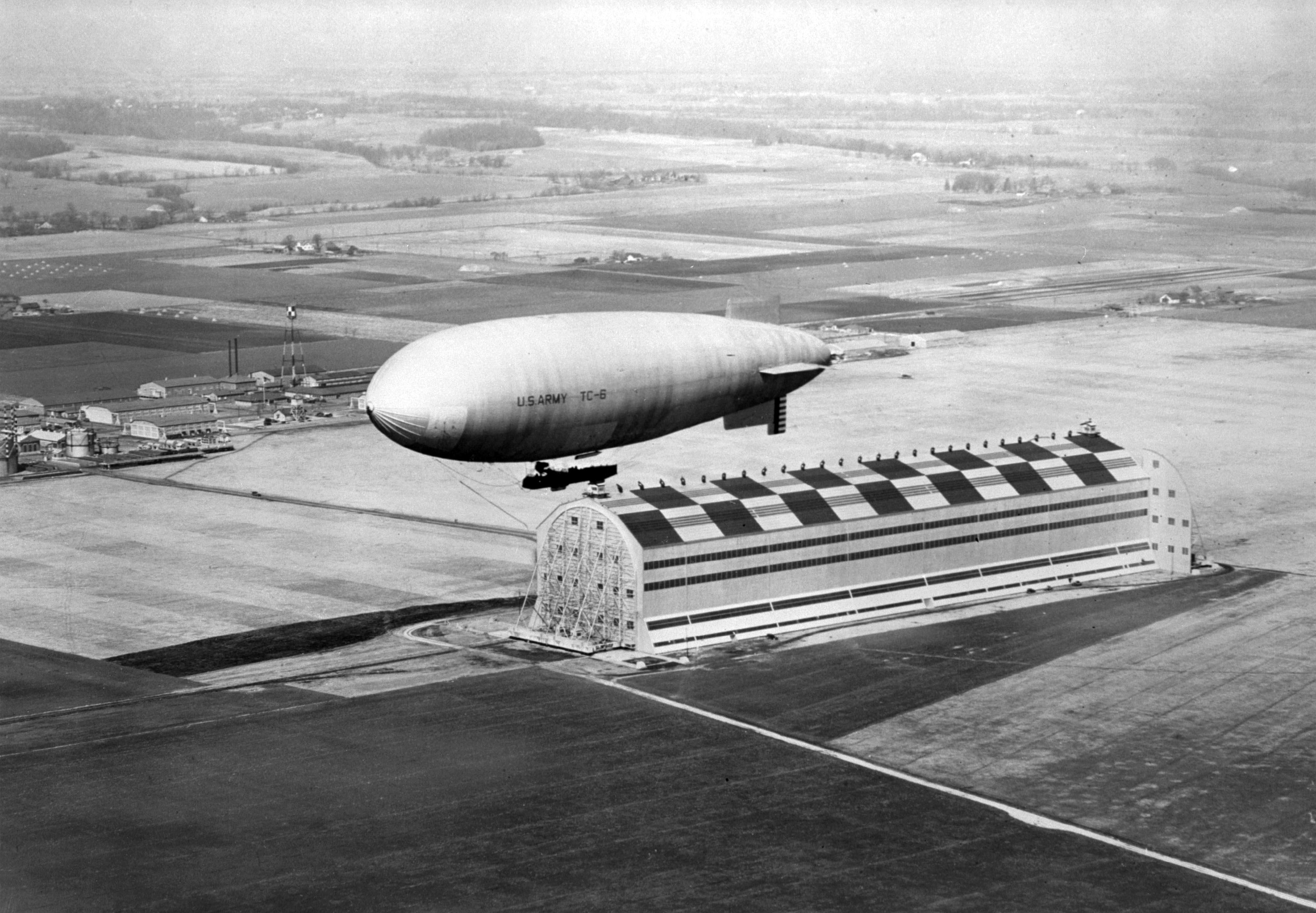
U.S. Army TC-6 airship at Scott Field in 1925
St. Clair County, Illinois

== See also ==
21st Airship Group
