= Charles E. Kilbourne =

US Army general and Medal of Honor recipient (1872–1963)

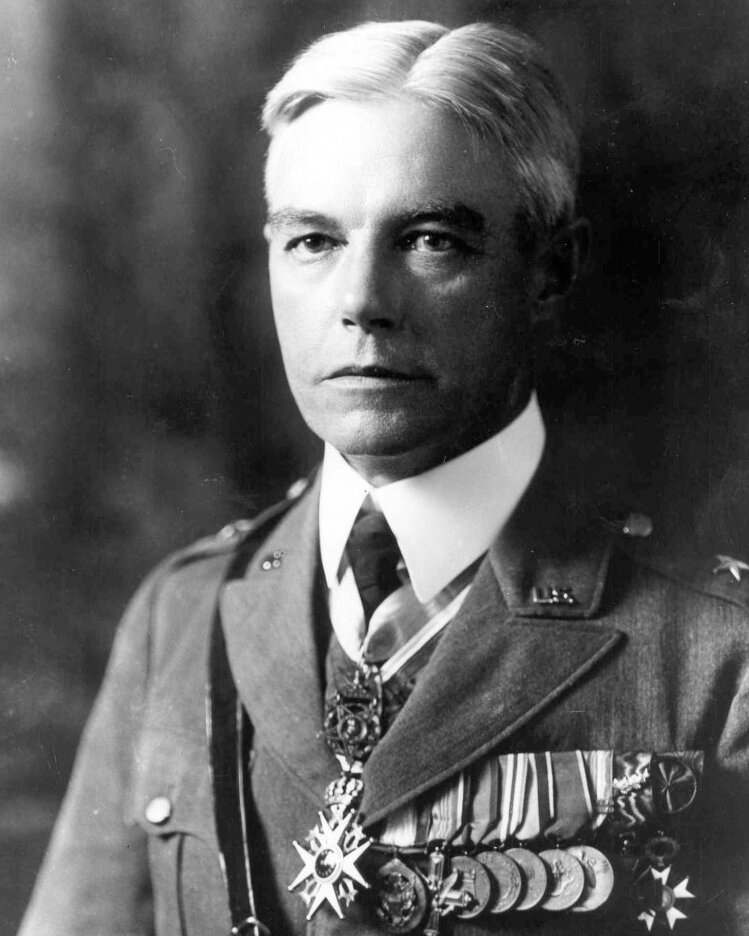
- Charles E. Kilbourne displaying U.S. and foreign awards, circa 1920.
- Born: December 23, 1872; Fort Myer, Virginia, United States
- Died: November 12, 1963 (aged 90); Washington, D.C., United States
- Burial place: Arlington National Cemetery, Virginia, United States
- Military career
- Allegiance: United States
- Branch: United States Army
- Service years: 1898–1936
- Rank: Major General
- Service number: 0-858
- Unit: U.S. Volunteer Signal Corps
- Conflicts: Philippine–American War; Boxer Rebellion; World War I
- Awards: Medal of Honor; Distinguished Service Cross; Distinguished Service Medal; Croix de Guerre (France); Legion of Honor

Major General Charles Evans Kilbourne Jr. (December 23, 1872 – November 12, 1963) was the first American to earn the United States' three highest military decorations. As an officer in the United States Army he received the Medal of Honor for his actions during the Philippine–American War. He served as a general officer during World War I, and received the Distinguished Service Cross and Army Distinguished Service Medal. After World War I, he served as the superintendent of the Virginia Military Institute, succeeding General John A. Lejeune, and had a post-military career as a distinguished writer.

== Biography ==
Kilbourne was born at Fort Myer, Virginia on December 23, 1872, a son of Charles E. Kilbourne Sr. (1844–1903) and Ada (Coolidge) Kilbourne. The senior Kilbourne was a career United States Army officer who served in the Union Army during the American Civil War and attained the Regular Army rank of major and brevet rank of colonel. The younger Kilbourne graduated from the Virginia Military Institute (VMI) in 1894 with academic distinction, winning the Second Jackson-Hope Medal for academic achievement. Kilbourne was an Honor Graduate of the Artillery School in 1903, a graduate of the General Staff College in 1920, and served as VMI's sixth superintendent, October 1, 1937, to July 11, 1946. Prior to joining the army, he worked for the Weather Bureau. He was also a member of the Sigma Chi fraternity.

=== Military service ===
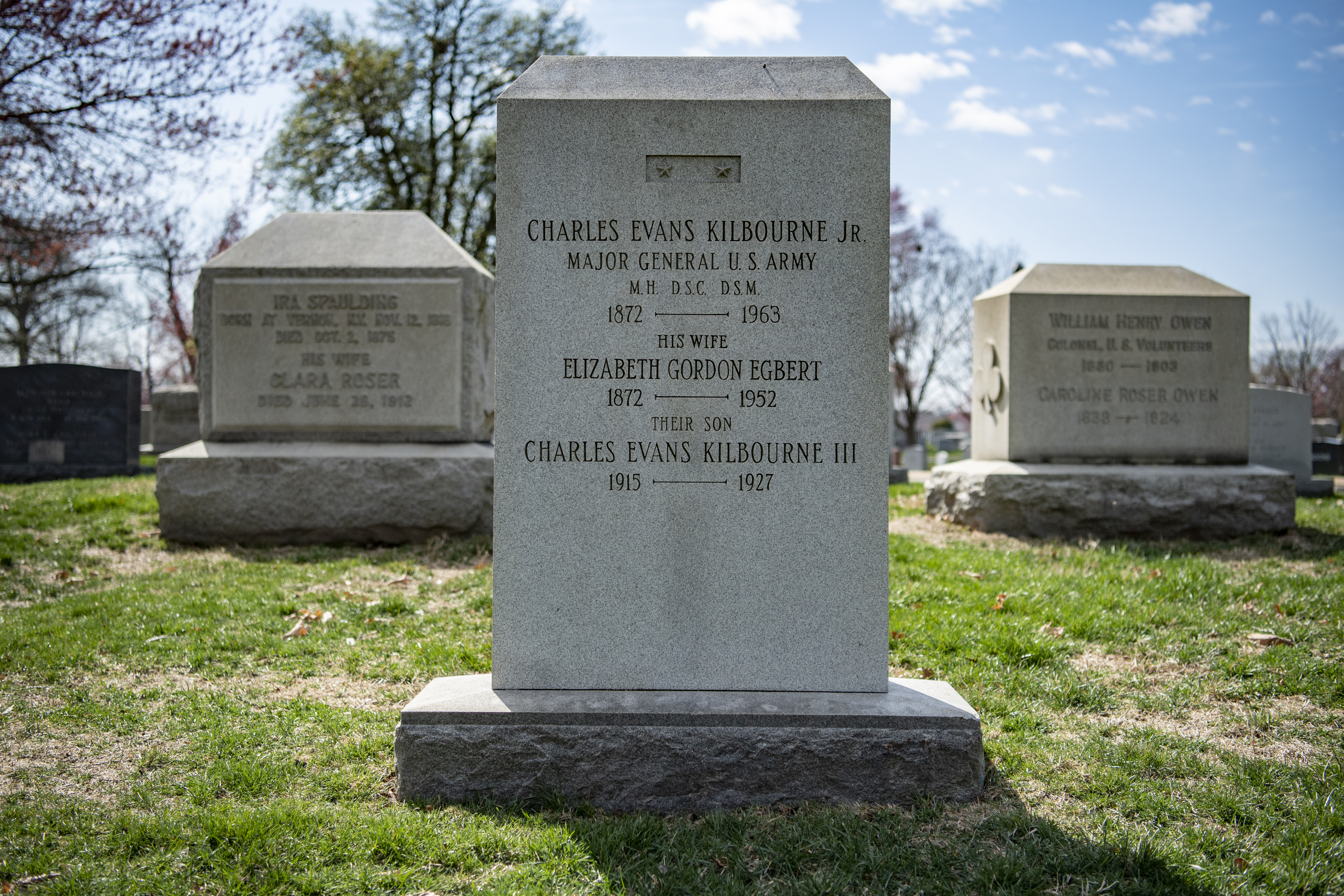
Grave at Arlington National Cemetery

He was commissioned a Second Lieutenant, May 20, 1898 in the Signal Corps and eventually reached the rank of major general, July 9, 1935.

Kilbourne served in the Philippine–American War as a second lieutenant in the campaign which captured Manila and included operations in Cavite, Laguna and Bulacan Provinces. He served in the Boxer Rebellion in China and the relief of the Allied legations in Peking and in operations in South Sulu. Kilbourne had five tours of duty in the Philippines. He was responsible for much of the military development of the island fortress of Corregidor. During his third assignment there, from 1908 to 1913, he established the first artillery garrison on Corregidor. In later Philippine duty in the late 1920s, Kilbourne initiated the elaborate tunnel system of Corregidor (Malinta Tunnel) which served American troops during the early stages of World War II and enabled Douglas MacArthur's troops to resist as long as they did in the face of the overwhelming odds in favor of the Japanese.

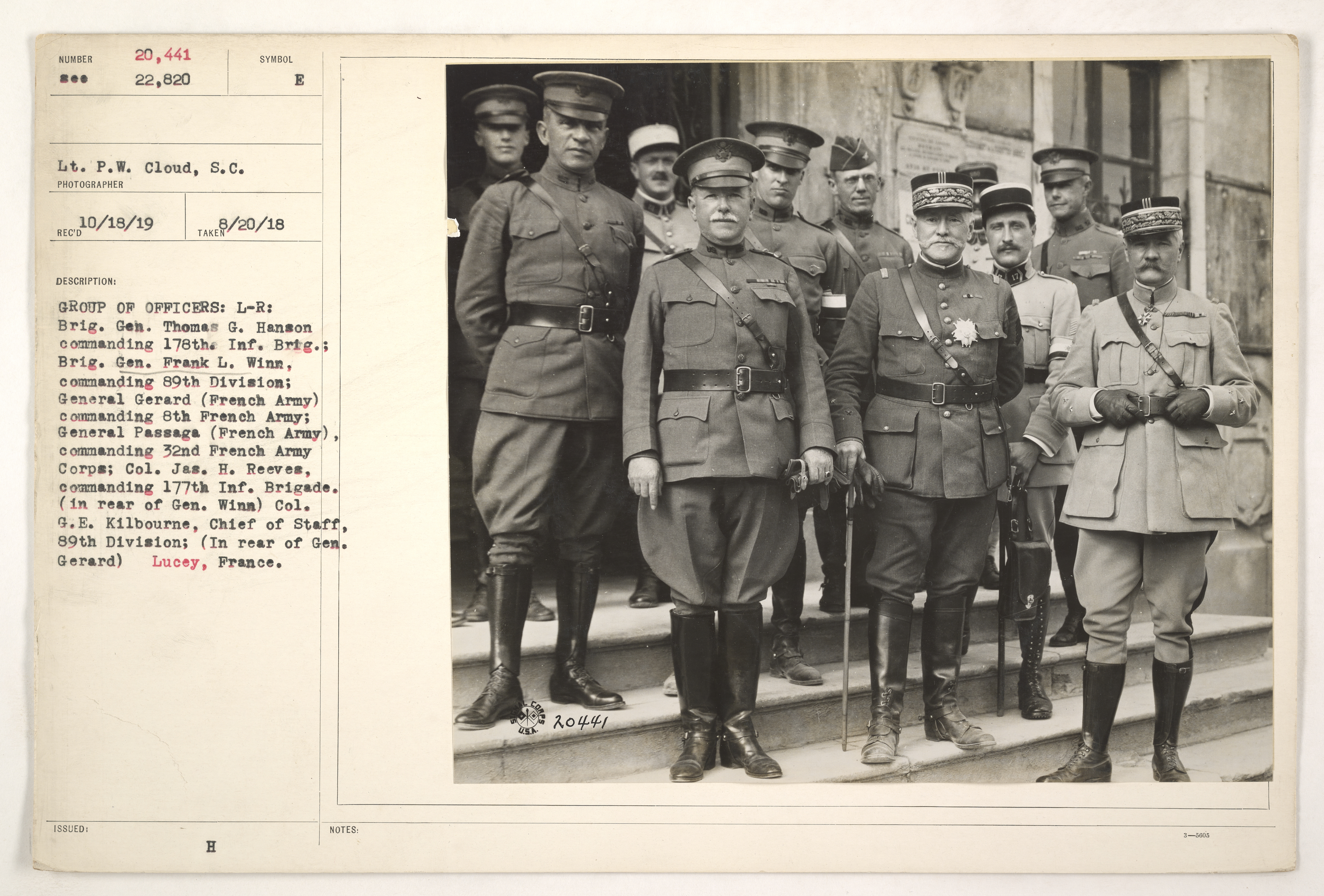

He was assigned to duty with the General Staff from 1911 to 1913 and again in 1915. He arrived in France on January 1, 1918, for service in World War I where he served on both the British and French fronts for a short period and then returned to Washington in March. While on an inspection tour, he lost the vision in his right eye in the explosion of a trench mortar shell. He returned to France in May 1918 with the 89th Division, continuing with that unit until October 6, 1918. He commanded the 36th Heavy Artillery Brigade and the 3rd Infantry Brigade during the remainder of his service in France and Germany.

He was the head of the U.S. Mission inspecting the coastal defenses of Europe and Turkey and returned to the U.S. in May 1919 to serve on the faculty of the Army War College from, 1920–1924. He later served as one of the directors of the college. He was Commandant of Boston Harbor from 1924 to 1925 and executive assistant to the chief of Coast Artillery from 1925 to 1928. In 1928 he commanded the 2nd Infantry Brigade, 1st Division until 1929 after which he commanded the Coast Artillery District of Manila and Subic Bay from 1929 to 1932 and served in the War Plans Division in Washington, D.C., from 1932 to 1934. He commanded the Sixth Corps Area and 2nd Army, 1936.

Kilbourne retired from the army in 1936 as a major general. In 1938 he was elected an honorary member of the Virginia Society of the Cincinnati. He died on November 12, 1963, and is buried with his wife and son in Arlington National Cemetery.

=== Educator ===
According to William H. Milton Jr, superintendent of the Virginia Military Institute, 1952–60, "In April, 1937, the Virginia Military Institute board of visitors named him superintendent of V.M.I. to succeed General John A. Lejeune. He came to the Institute in time to plan and direct the centennial celebration of the founding of V.M.I. and served during the trying war years when problems of discipline and of economy in operation were staggering in number and complexity. He brought to V.M.I. not only the training of a soldier but the compelling power of his own example as a Christian gentleman."

=== Writer ===
Gen. Kilbourne was also a prolific writer. He wrote An Army Boy in the Philippines, An Army Boy in Pekin, An Army Boy in Mexico, An Army Boy in Alaska, the Baby Animal Stories (10 volumes) published between 1913 and 1917, Rolfe of Ebon: A Novel of Romance, War and Adventure in Ancient England, and he was the editor of the National Service Library which was a 5-volume set published in 1917.

== Awards and honors ==
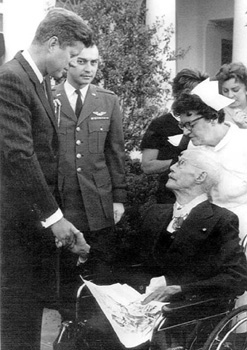
Kilbourne and President John F. Kennedy at the White House (May 2, 1963)

During his career in the Army, Kilbourne received numerous awards including the following:

- Medal of Honor for "distinguished gallantry" at Paco Bridge, Philippine Islands, February 5, 1899
- Distinguished Service Cross for "extraordinary heroism in action" near Thiacourt, France, September 12, 1918
- Distinguished Service Medal "for services in 89th Division and 36th Artillery Brigade"
- Croix de Guerre (France) for "reconnaissances preparatory to assault on the St. Mihiel Salient"
- Officer of the Legion of Honor (France)
- Spanish Campaign Medal
- China Campaign Medal
- Philippine Campaign Medal
- Victory Medal

=== Medal of Honor citation ===
Rank and organization: First Lieutenant, U.S. Volunteer Signal Corps. Place and date: At Paco Bridge, Philippine Islands, February 5, 1899. Entered service at. Portland. Oreg. Birth: Fort Myer, Va. Date of issue: May 6, 1905.

Citation:

Within a range of 250 yards of the enemy and in the face of a rapid fire climbed a telegraph pole at the east end of the bridge and in full view of the enemy coolly and carefully repaired a broken telegraph wire, thereby reestablishing telegraphic communication to the front.

== See also ==
- List of Medal of Honor recipients
