= Frank C. Bolles =

US Army general (1872–1955)

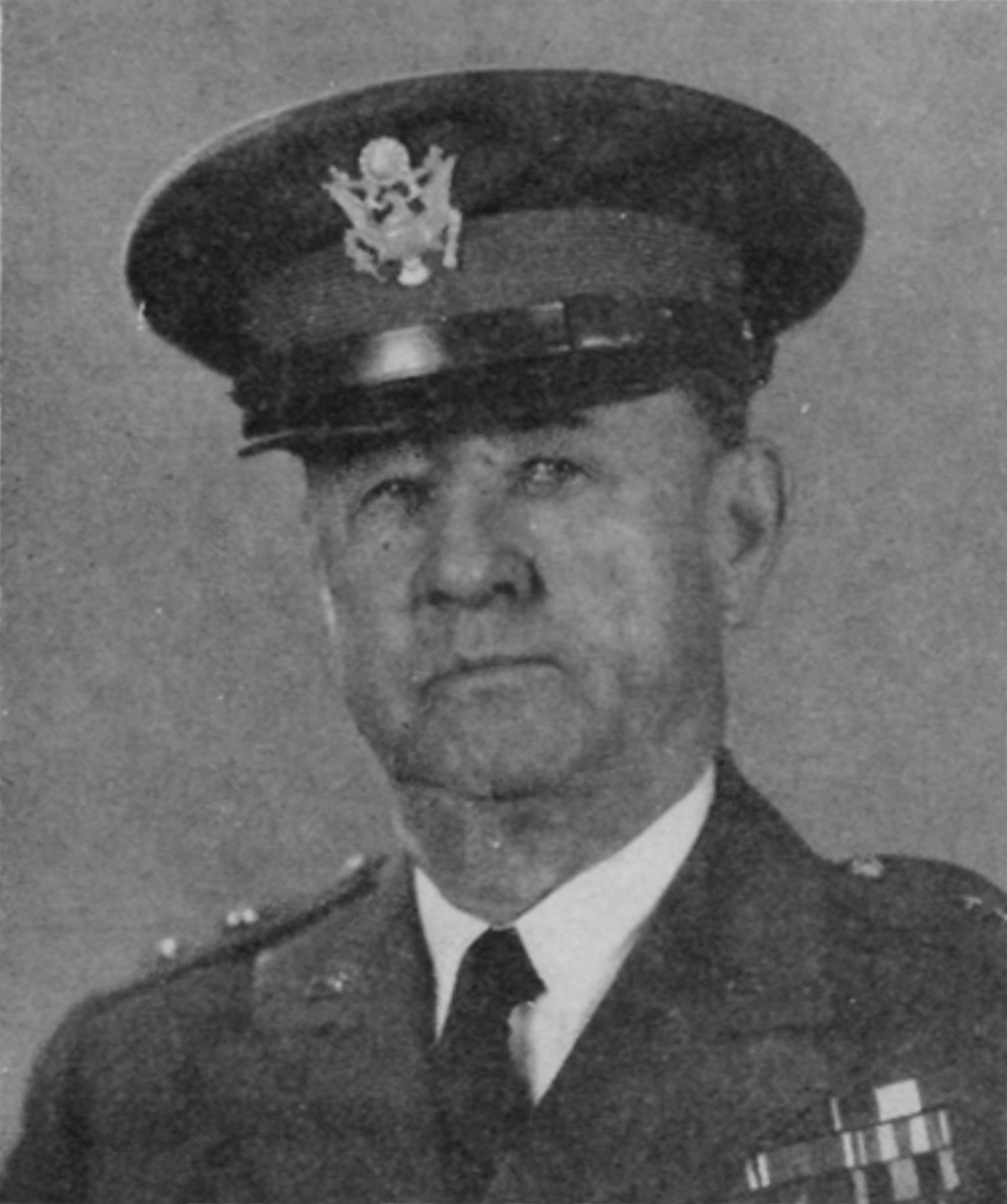
- Born: 25 September 1872; Elgin, Illinois
- Died: 14 July 1955 (aged 82) Marlin, Texas
- Allegiance: United States
- Branch: United States Army
- Service years: 1896–1936
- Rank: Major General
- Commands: 7th Corps Area; 2nd Infantry Division; 6th Corps Area (Interim); 12th Infantry Brigade; 4th Infantry Brigade; 6th Infantry Brigade (Acting); 30th Infantry Regiment; Presidio of San Francisco; 39th Infantry, 4th Division; 2nd Infantry Regiment; Battalion, 2nd Infantry; Battalion, 3rd Infantry (Acting)
- Conflicts: Spanish–American War; Philippine–American War; World War I
- Awards: Distinguished Service Cross (2); Distinguished Service Medal; Silver Star; Purple Heart (3)

Frank Crandall Bolles (25 September 1872 – 14 July 1955) was a United States Army major general. A veteran of combat in both the Philippine–American War and World War I, he was awarded two Distinguished Service Crosses, a Silver Star and three Purple Hearts.

== Early life and education ==
Bolles was born in Elgin, Illinois, but his family soon moved to Rolla, Missouri where he received his early education. He entered the United States Military Academy in June 1891, but struggled through some of the academic and tactical training. After five years with a one-month leave of absence from January to February 1894, Bolles graduated 69th in a class of 73 cadets in June 1896 and was commissioned as an infantry officer.

Before participating in World War I, Bolles was a distinguished graduate of the Army School of the Line at Fort Leavenworth, Kansas in May 1916. After the war, he returned to Fort Leavenworth and graduated from the General Staff School in 1920. Bolles then went to Washington, D.C. to study at the Army War College, graduating in 1921.

== Military career ==
Bolles was initially assigned to the 6th Infantry, serving at Fort Thomas, Kentucky. In January 1897, he was transferred to the 18th Infantry at Fort Sam Houston, Texas. During the Spanish–American War, his regiment was sent to the Philippines, sailing from Mobile, Alabama in May 1898 to participate in the capture of Manila. During the Philippine–American War, he was wounded in action at Jaro in February 1899 and recommended for a brevet and the Medal of Honor. In 1923, Bolles was awarded the Distinguished Service Cross with the citation:

The President of the United States of America, authorized by Act of Congress, July 9, 1918, takes pleasure in presenting the Distinguished Service Cross to Second Lieutenant (Infantry) Frank Crandall Bolles, United States Army, for extraordinary heroism while serving with 18th Infantry, in action during the attack on Jaro, Panay, Philippine Islands, 12 February 1899. Second Lieutenant Bolles exhibited conspicuous bravery and skill in handling his detachment and directing the fire of his piece. Even after he was seriously wounded in the leg he continued to encourage his men and could scarcely be prevailed upon to desist from attempting mounting his horse when so crippled as to be unable to do so.

Later in 1899, Bolles was promoted to first lieutenant retroactive to January and transferred back to the 6th Infantry. Remaining in the Philippines, he was wounded twice at Tangalan in February 1900. Promoted to captain in October 1901, Bolles served as a company commander until his return to the United States in June 1902. After duty at Fort Riley and Fort Leavenworth, Kansas, he returned to the Philippines in March 1905. In March 1906, Bolles participated in an engagement with Moro rebels at Bud Dajo. He was subsequently awarded the Silver Star for his actions. Returning to the United States in November 1906, Bolles served at Fort Lincoln, North Dakota until March 1908 and then at Fort William H. Harrison, Montana until October 1909.

From October to November 1909, Bolles served as assistant to the Depot Quartermaster at St. Louis, Missouri. He then served as Depot Quartermaster at Omaha, Nebraska until March 1911. Bolles served as Chief Quartermaster, Department of the Missouri from March to June 1911. After duty at the office of the Quartermaster General in Washington, D.C. until December 1912, he was transferred to the 3rd Infantry and given command of a company at Madison Barracks, New York from January 1913 to August 1915. After attending the School of the Line, Bolles rejoined his regiment at Camp Eagle Pass, Texas as a company commander in May 1916. Promoted to major in July, he briefly served as a battalion commander from 10 August to 20 August 1916.

Detached from his regiment, Bolles served with the Maryland National Guard as a district range officer and inspector-instructor until April 1917. He then joined the 2nd Infantry as a battalion commander at Fort Shafter, Hawaii in May 1917. On 5 August 1917, Bolles received a temporary promotion to lieutenant colonel followed by a second temporary promotion to colonel. He then assumed command of both Fort Shafter and the regiment until March 1918.

In April 1918, Bolles assumed command of the 39th Infantry, 4th Division and sailed with them for France in May. He led the regiment in combat operations from 19 July to 28 September 1917. During their first engagement on 19 July, Bolles was exposed to a gas attack. On 28 September, he was wounded in action. In 1919, he was awarded the Distinguished Service Cross with the citation:

The President of the United States of America, authorized by Act of Congress, July 9, 1918, takes pleasure in presenting a Bronze Oak Leaf Cluster in lieu of a Second Award of the Distinguished Service Cross to Colonel (Infantry) Frank Crandall Bolles, United States Army, for extraordinary heroism in action while serving with 39th Infantry Regiment, 4th Division, A.E.F., near Septsarges, France, 26 September and near Bois-de-Fays, France, 28 September 1918. On 26 September Colonel Bolles personally directed the assaulting battalion of his regiment when the line was temporarily held up by hostile fire, leading the attacking troops forward to their objective. After reaching the objective, terrific hostile fire caused many casualties, and the line was beginning to waver when Colonel Bolles assisted in the reorganization of the line, and by his personal example of courage and fearlessness encouraged his men to hold in the face of the withering machine-gun and artillery fire until the flank division had advanced abreast. On 28 September he rallied his men under the sweeping fire of machine guns, minenwerfer, and artillery, and although painfully wounded, personally assisted in the reorganization of the positions.

After recovering from his wound, Bolles returned to command the 39th Infantry from November 1918 to August 1919, when he reverted to his permanent rank of major. In 1919, he was awarded the Army Distinguished Service Medal with the citation:

The President of the United States of America, authorized by Act of Congress, July 9, 1918, takes pleasure in presenting the Army Distinguished Service Medal to Colonel (Infantry) Frank Crandall Bolles, United States Army, for exceptionally meritorious and distinguished services to the Government of the United States, in a duty of great responsibility during World War I. Colonel Bolles commanded, with keen tactical ability, the 39th Infantry throughout the various campaigns in which the Fourth Division participated until the early stages of the Meuse-Argonne offensive, when he was wounded. By his exceptional ability and energetic leadership he proved to be an important factor in the successes of his command during its active operations against the enemy.

Bolles was also made a chevalier of the Legion of Honour and awarded the Croix de guerre with palm and gilt star by France.

Bolles was permanently promoted to lieutenant colonel in March 1920 and colonel in July 1920. In 1921, he served as executive officer of the Citizens Military Training Camp at Camp Devens, Massachusetts. In June 1922, Bolles was conferred the honorary degree of Civil Engineer by the University of Missouri. From 1922 to 1924, he was chief of staff for the 94th Division, Organized Reserves at Boston, Massachusetts. After staff assignments in Washington, D.C. and San Francisco, California, Bolles assumed command of the Presidio of San Francisco in September 1925. In October 1925, he also assumed command of the 30th Infantry and then led both the post and the regiment until March 1928. From August 1926 to November 1927, Bolles was also acting commanding general of the 6th Infantry Brigade.

In March 1928, Bolles was promoted to brigadier general. From April 1928 to May 1929, he served as commanding general of the 4th Infantry Brigade and Fort D. A. Russell, Wyoming. Bolles then served a third tour of duty in the Philippines from June 1929 to June 1931. From August 1931 to February 1935, he served as commanding general of the 12th Infantry Brigade and Fort Sheridan, Illinois. From October 1934 to February 1935, he also served as interim commander of the 6th Corps Area.

In February 1935, Bolles accepted a promotion to major general retroactive to December 1934. He then assumed command of the 2nd Infantry Division and Fort Sam Houston, Texas. His assignment was cut short in July 1935 by the death of Maj. Gen. Stuart Heintzelman. He instead went to Omaha, Nebraska to assume command of the 7th Corps Area. Bolles relinquished this final command and retired from active duty on 30 September 1936 after having reached the mandatory retirement age of 64.

== Family and later life ==
Bolles married Irene Hobby Pettit (10 January 1880 – 17 December 1954) in Hempstead, New York on 10 January 1909. They had three sons and two daughters. The eldest, Frank C. Bolles Jr. (2 February 1910 – 12 June 1960), was a 1934 graduate of the U.S. Naval Academy who served during World War II and retired as a commander.

After retirement, Bolles and his wife lived in San Antonio, Texas. In July 1937, he became president of the Union State Bank in South San Antonio. In 1954, his health began to deteriorate. He was hospitalized in Marlin, Texas after his wife's death and died there in 1955. Bolles, his wife and their eldest son are interred at Arlington National Cemetery.
