= 39th Infantry Regiment (United States) =

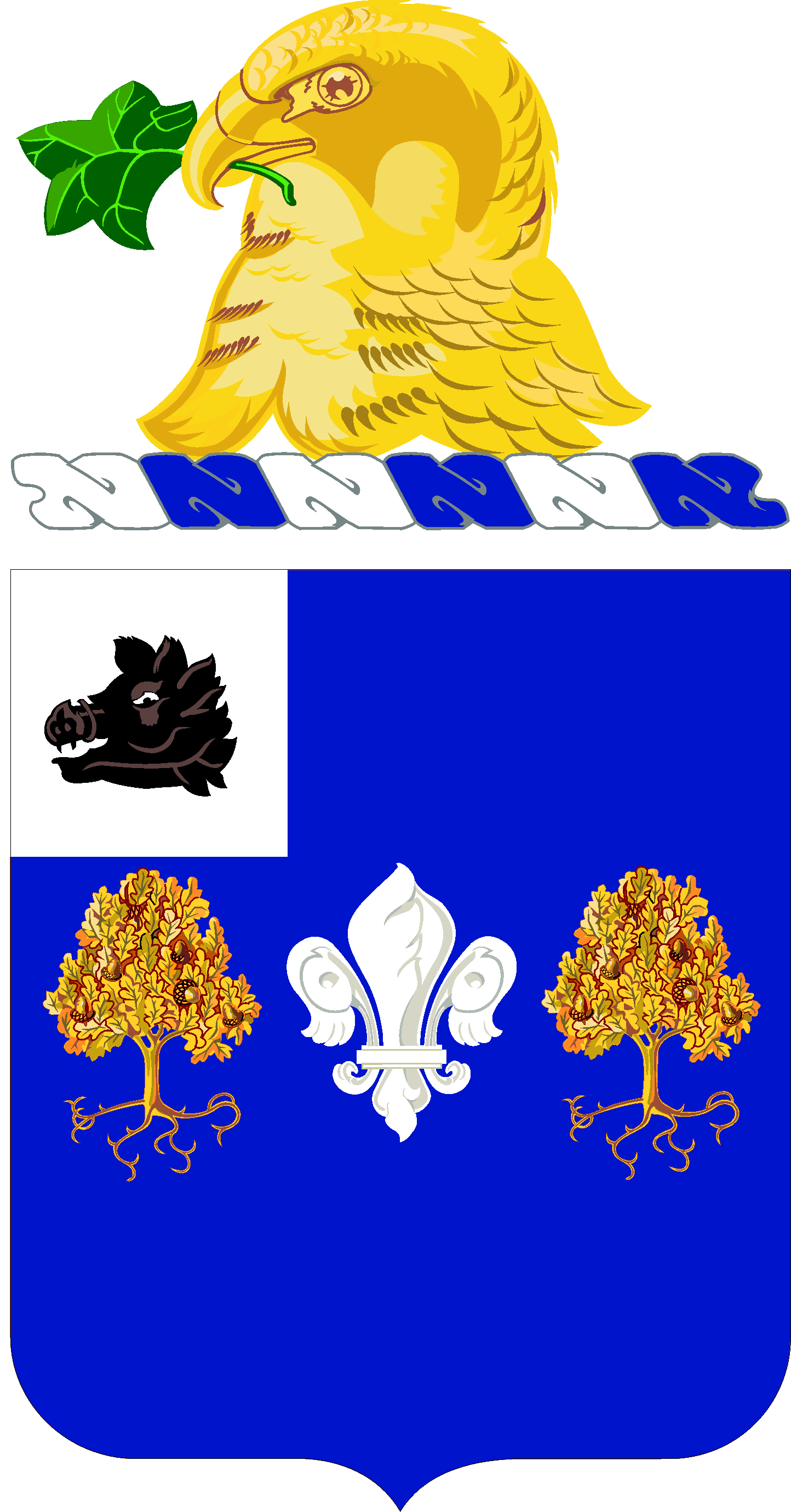
- Coat of arms
- Active: 1917–present
- Country: United States
- Branch: United States Army
- Type: Infantry
- Nicknames: "Fighting Falcons" (World War I), "AAA-O (Anything, Anytime, Anywhere, Bar Nothing)" (special designation)
- Motto: D'une Vaillance Admirable (With a Military Courage Worthy of Admiration)
- Engagements: World War I; World War II; Vietnam War

Commanders
- Notable commanders: Frank C. Bolles; James K. Parsons; Troy H. Middleton; Harry A. "Paddy" Flint; Van H. Bond

Insignia
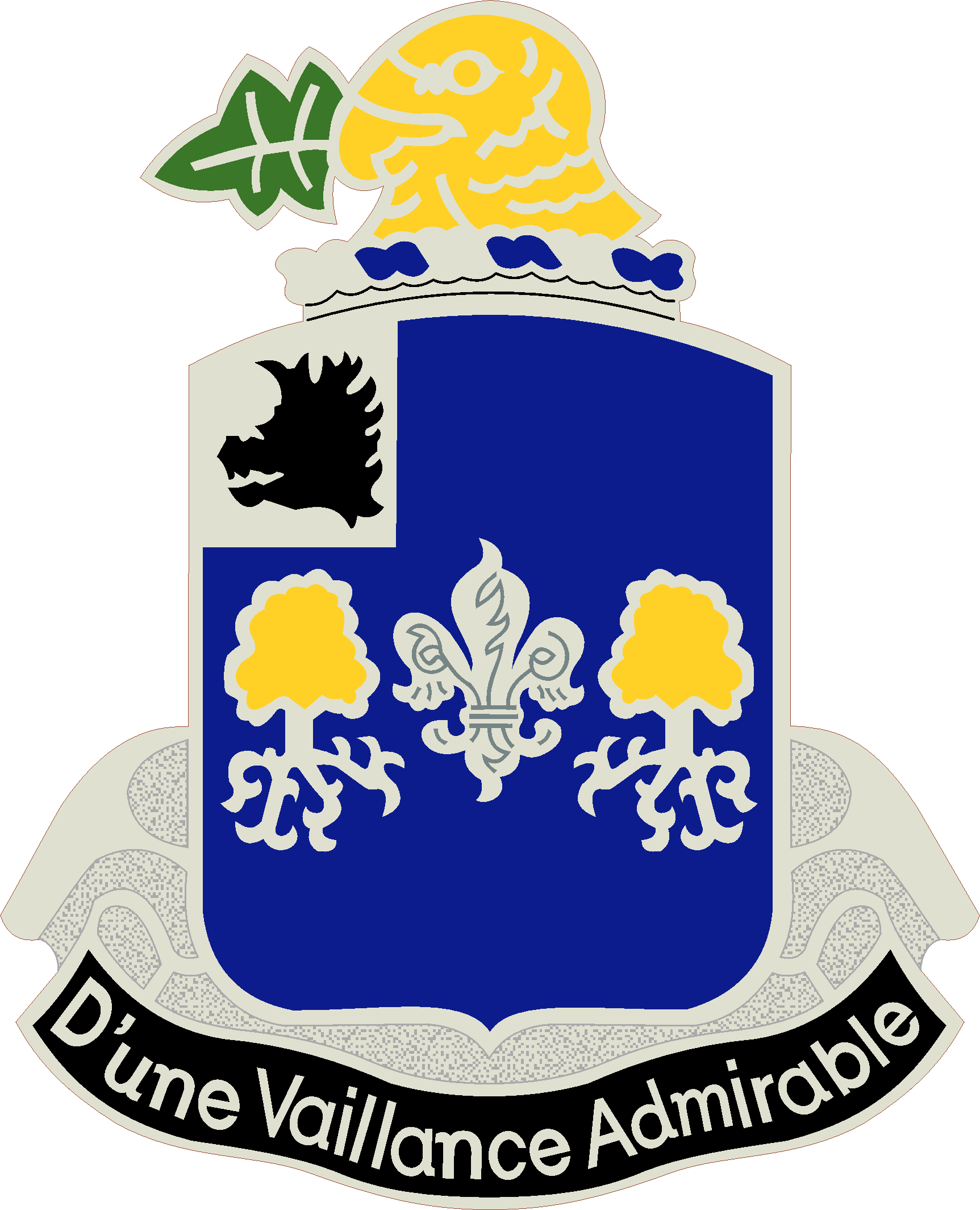
- Identification symbol

The 39th Infantry Regiment is a parent regiment in the United States Army. Originally organized for service in World War I, the 39th fought in most of the conflicts involving the United States during the 20th century, and since 1990 the 2nd Battalion has served as a training unit stationed at Fort Jackson, South Carolina. The 3rd Battalion was started on 21 October 2015 and a 4th Battalion was added in July 2017.

== Other units called "39th Infantry Regiment" ==
There was a 39th United States Infantry raised in Tennessee for service in the War of 1812. In 1815, after that war ended, the 39th was consolidated with the 8th and 24th Regiments to form the 7th Infantry Regiment.

In the 1866 reorganization of the Regular Army after the American Civil War, Congress authorized a 39th Infantry Regiment, one of four so-called "Colored Troops" regiments with African American enlisted men and white officers. The Army was reduced in size in 1869, and the 39th and 40th were consolidated into the 25th Infantry Regiment.

== History ==
The 39th Infantry Regiment was organized at Camp Syracuse, New York on 1 June 1917 by transfer of veteran troops from the 30th Infantry Regiment.

=== World War I ===
In December 1917, the 39th was assigned to the 4th Infantry Division and in the spring of 1918, sailed for France as part of the American Expeditionary Force in World War I. Its service in this war earned the regiment its nickname "Fighting Falcons". The regimental commanders included Frank C. Bolles, James K. Parsons and Troy H. Middleton. In October 1918, the U.S. 39th Infantry Regiment (4th Infantry Division) fought in the intense Meuse-Argonne Offensive in France, specifically engaging in operations near the Bois de Fays and the town of Cunel. The regiment, known as "Fighting Falcons," was part of the American Expeditionary Force (AEF) breaking through German lines. Location: The Argonne sector, specifically fighting around Cunel and the Bois de Fays.

=== Between wars ===
The 39th Infantry arrived at the port of New York on 6 August 1919 on the USS Leviathan and was transferred on 13 August 1919 to Camp Dodge, Iowa. It was transferred on 2 August 1920 to Camp Lewis, Washington, and inactivated there on 21 September 1921. It was subsequently allotted to the Fourth Corps Area; the 59th Infantry Regiment had previously been designated as Active Associate on 7 July 1921, from which the 39th Infantry would be reactivated in time of war. The personnel of the 39th Infantry were concurrently transferred to the units of the 3rd Division. The 59th Infantry Regiment was relieved as Active Associate on 17 July 1922 and the 8th Infantry Regiment of the 39th's parent 4th Division was designated as the Active Associate.

The 39th Infantry was organized on 26 July 1926 with Organized Reserve personnel as a "Regular Army Inactive" (RAI) unit with headquarters at Clemson, South Carolina. The regiment, less the 3rd Battalion, was affiliated with the Clemson Agricultural College ROTC program and organized on 25 February 1927 as an RAI unit with Regular Army personnel assigned to the ROTC Detachment and Reserve officers commissioned from the program; the 8th Infantry was relieved as Active Associate on 30 June 1927. The 39th Infantry was relieved from the 4th Division on 15 August 1927 and assigned to the 7th Division. Concurrently, the 3rd Battalion was affiliated with The Citadel and organized at Charleston, South Carolina. The regiment conducted summer training most years at Fort Moultrie, South Carolina. The 39th Infantry was relieved from the 7th Division on 1 October 1933 and reassigned to the 4th Division. The regimental headquarters was transferred by 1939 to Charleston. The regiment was relieved on 16 October 1939 from the 7th Infantry Brigade, and further relieved from the 4th Division on 1 August 1940 and assigned to the 9th Division. Reserve personnel were relieved on 4 August 1940, and the regiment was reactivated on 9 August 1940 at Fort Bragg, North Carolina.

Shoulder sleeve insignia of the 9th Infantry Division

During the lull between wars, the regimental crest was designed and approved. The shield is blue for infantry. The fleur-de-lis is from the coat of arms of Soissons, a town in France recaptured by the 39th Regiment in 1918. The two trees represent the Groves of Cresnes, the site of the regiment's first military success in France during World War I. The boar's head on the canton is taken from the crest of the 30th Infantry Regiment and indicates the 39th was organized with personnel from the 30th Infantry Regiment. The crest is a falcon's head, for Mount Faucon in Meuse-Argonne. The falcon holds an ivy leaf in its bill, in recognition of the shoulder sleeve insignia of the 4th Infantry Division to which the regiment was assigned during World War I. The motto "D'une Vaillance Admirable" is a quotation from the French citation which awarded the Croix De Guerre with Gilt Star to the regiment for its distinguished service in World War I. The motto best translates - "With a Military Courage Worthy of Admiration".

=== World War II ===
During World War II the regiment fought as part of the 9th Infantry Division. The Fighting Falcons of the 39th became the first unit of United States combat troops to set foot on foreign soil when they stormed the beaches of Algiers in November 1942. During fighting in Sicily, Italy, the regiment came under the command of Colonel Harry A. "Paddy" Flint who gave the regiment its triple A- Bar Nothing slogan: Anything, Anywhere, Anytime - Bar Nothing. The regiment took great pride in the AAA-O slogan, displaying it on their helmets and vehicles, even in combat. When questioned about the soundness of the practice, Colonel Flint said, "The enemy who sees our regiment in combat, if they live through the battle, will know to run the next time they see us coming." General George Patton said of Colonel Flint: "Paddy Flint is clearly nuts, but he fights well." On 31 July 1943, while temporarily attached to the 1st Infantry Division), the 39th suffered its first serious reverse at the battle of Troina, when entrenched and heavily armed German forces repelled an assault by the 39th Infantry Regiment with heavy casualties.

Later in the war, the 39th landed at Utah Beach on 10 June 1944 (D+4) with other reinforcing units and then fought through the rugged French countryside. Colonel Flint was killed six weeks after the regiment entered combat. The regiment joined the 47th Infantry Regiment in capturing Roetgen, the first German town to fall in World War II. The 39th fought through the Battle of the Bulge, helped secure the Remagen bridgehead and moved across Germany as the allied forces finished off the last of the German resistance. In the war the 39th Regiment received campaign streamers from battles in Algeria, Tunisia, Sicily, Normandy, Northern France, The Rhineland, Ardennes-Alsace, and Central Europe. It was cited twice by the Belgians for valorous actions and awarded the Belgian Fourragère. It also received two French Croix de Guerre with Palm, the French Fourragère, and three Presidential Unit Citations.

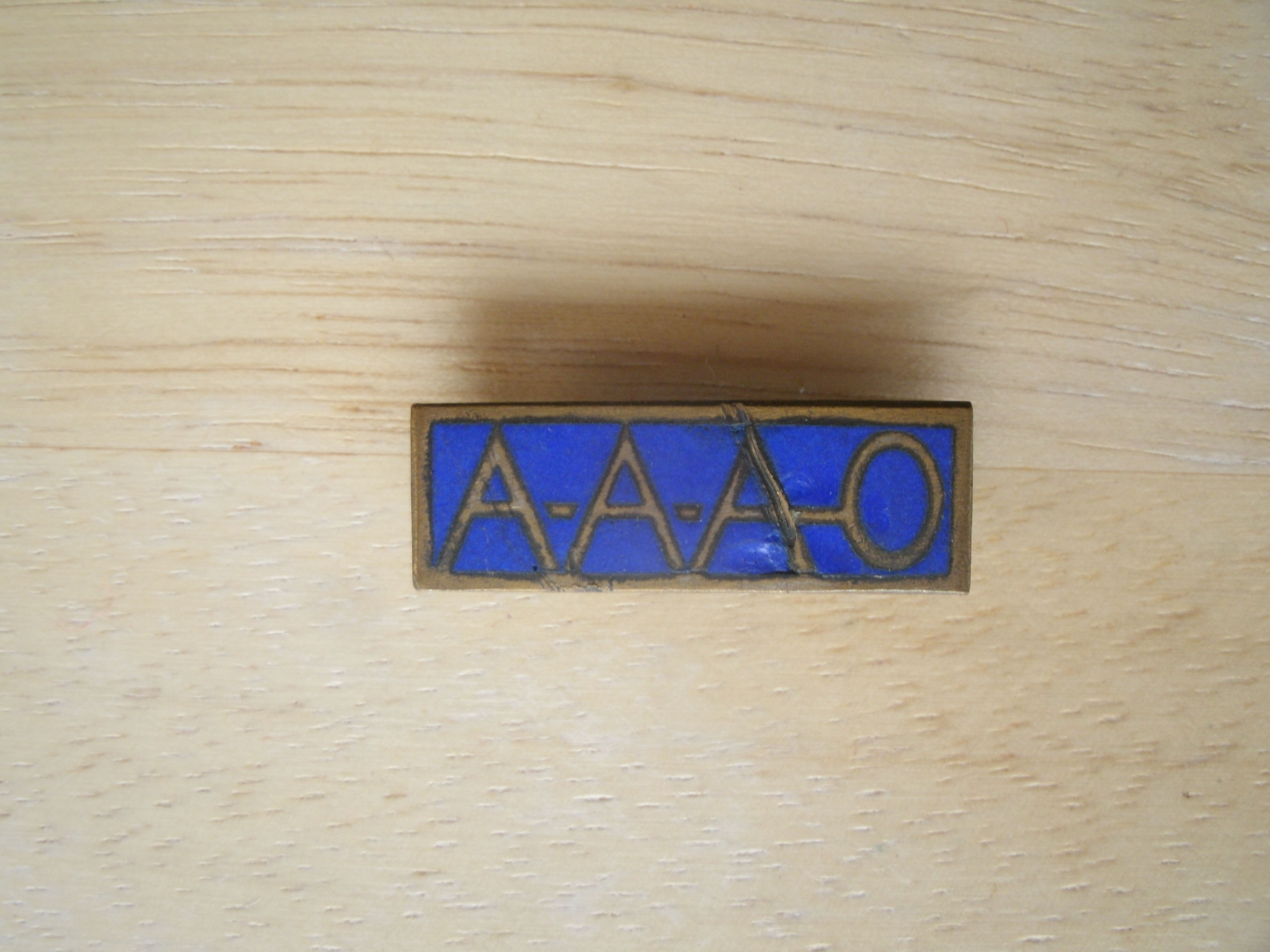
AAA-O bar worn on the uniform of PFC John R. Hedlund during WW II

=== Cold War ===
In July 1954 the 9th Infantry Regiment was activated at Montieth Barracks, Fürth, West Germany as a maneuver regiment of the 9th Infantry Division. For the next three years the regiment and its parent division engaged in aggressive individual and collective training as part of U.S. VII Corps, one of the two corps assigned to U.S. 7th Army, U.S. Army Europe (USAREUR). The formation was a critical part of the developing NATO force and its capability to deter any Warsaw Pact activity that threatened the integrity of the West German eastern frontier. In performing this mission, the regiment and its soldiers made a major contribution to assuring the security of Western Europe during this phase of the Cold War.

=== Vietnam ===
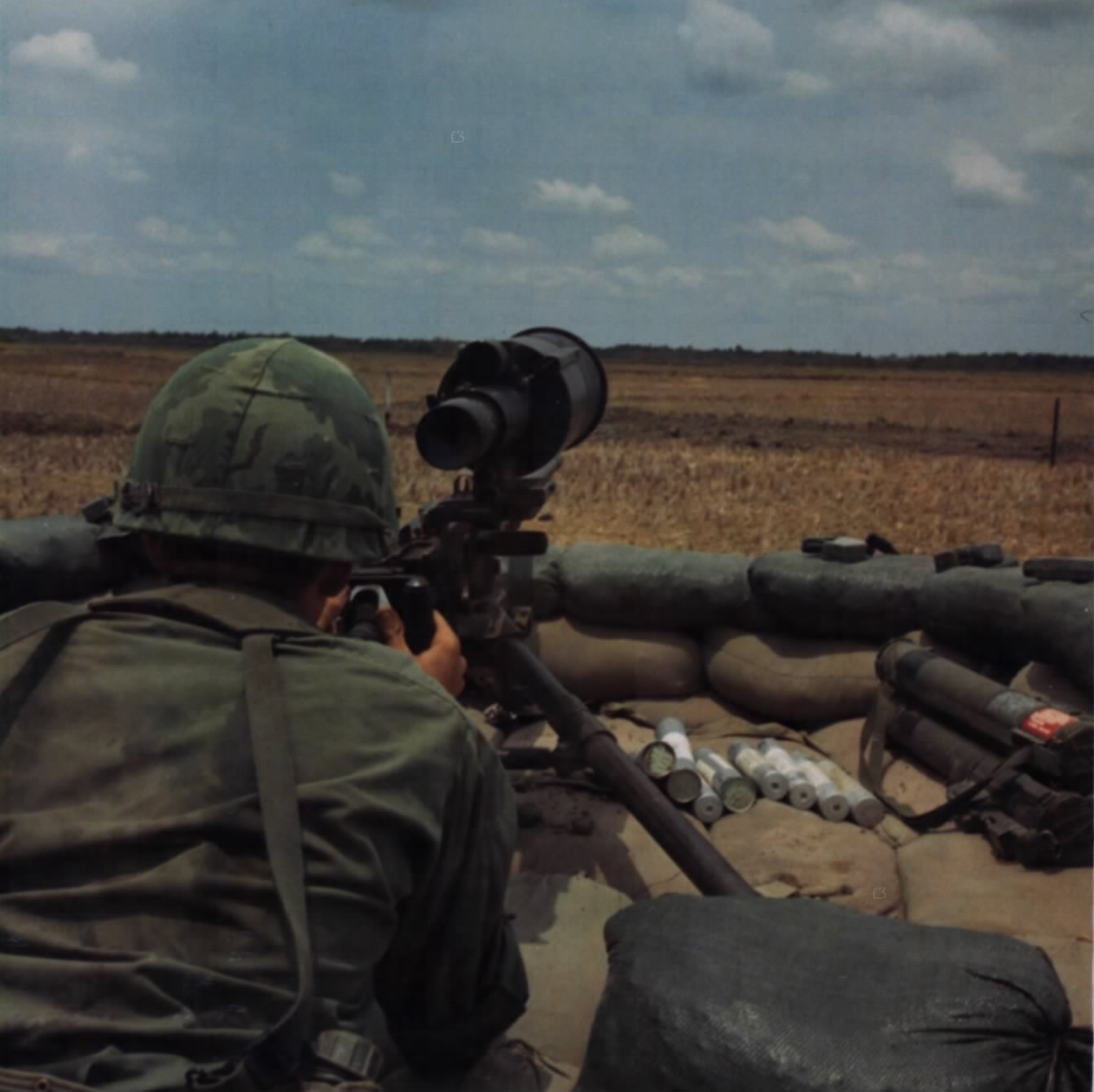
A machine gunner in Company "E", 2nd Battalion, 39th Infantry aims a .50-caliber machine gun at Đồng Tâm Base Camp, 20 April 1968

After a series of inactivations and activations spanning a 20-year period, the 2nd, 3rd and 4th Battalions, 39th Infantry Regiment were reactivated on 1 February 1966 as part of the 9th Infantry Division at Fort Riley, Kansas. The 39th deployed in 1966 with the 9th Infantry Division to South Vietnam. The regiment participated in Operation Palm Beach, the 1968 Tet Offensive, and the battle of the Plain of Reeds. When the 39th Infantry Regiment returned to Hawaii and deactivated in September, 1969, its battle streamers now included Counteroffensive Phase II, Counteroffensive Phase III, TET Counteroffensive, Counteroffensive Phase IV, Counteroffensive Phase V, Counteroffensive Phase VI, TET 69 Counteroffensive, and Summer-Fall 1969. The battalions had also received three Republic of Vietnam Crosses of Gallantry with Palm, the Republic of Vietnam Civil Action Medal, First Class, two Valorous Unit Awards and its fourth Presidential Unit Citation.

Then–Lieutenant Colonel David Hackworth commanded the 4th Battalion, 39th Infantry, in Vietnam.

=== Post-Vietnam ===
When the 9th Infantry Division was again reconstituted around 1972, this time at Fort Lewis, Washington, it was established again with the 2nd and the 3rd Battalions 39th Infantry (the 1st Battalion was serving with the 8th Infantry Division in Baumholder, Germany.) It remained a part of the active Army in the 9th Division until the "Old Reliables" were again deactivated around 1991.

Following reactivation and transfer to the Training and Doctrine Command, the 2d and 4th Battalions - IET, BCT -, 39th Infantry Regiment departed Fort Dix, New Jersey for Fort Jackson, South Carolina, arriving on 22 August 1990. 4th Battalion 39th Infantry was reactivated in October 2017 at Fort Jackson. The battalions conduct Basic Combat Training, and are part of the 165th Infantry Brigade at Fort Jackson, organized with a headquarters company and six-line (training) companies, designated A through E.

== Awards and recognitions ==
=== Unit citations ===
For its part in World Wars I, II and the Vietnam War, the 39th Infantry Regiment possesses 21 battle streamers. Its decorations include four Presidential Unit Citations, four French Croix de Guerre (two with Palm and one with Gilt Star), and the Belgian Fourageré.

- Presidential Unit Citation (Army), Streamer embroidered, Contentin Peninsula (1st Battalion)
- Presidential Unit Citation (Army), Streamer embroidered, Cherence Le Roussel (1st Battalion)
- Presidential Unit Citation (Army), Streamer embroidered, Le Desert (2d Battalion)
- Presidential Unit Citation (Army), Streamer embroidered, Ding Tuong Province (2d Battalion)
- Valorous Unit Award, Streamer embroidered, Ben Tre City, (2d and 3d Battalions {less Companies A, D and E})
- Valorous Unit Award, Streamer embroidered, Saigon (3d and 4th Battalions)
- French Croix de Guerre with Gold Star, World War I, Streamer embroidered, Aisne-Marne
- French Croix de Guerre, WWII, Fourragere (1st Battalion)
- Belgian Fourragere, 1940
- Cited in the Order of the Day of the Belgian Army for action on the Meuse River
- Cited in the Order of the Day of the Belgian Army for action in the Ardennes

=== Medals of Honor ===
Four soldiers received the U.S. Medal of Honor while serving with the 39th Infantry.

- Peter J. Dalessondro - Company E - World War II
- Edward A. DeVore, Jr. - Company B, 4th Battalion - Vietnam
- Don J. Jenkins - Company A, 2d Battalion - Vietnam
- David P. Nash - Company B, 2d Battalion - Vietnam

=== Campaign streamers ===
World War I

- Aisne-Marne
- St. Mihiel
- Meuse-Argonne
- Champagne 1918
- Lorraine 1918

World War II

- Algeria-French Morocco
- Tunisia
- Sicily
- Normandy
- Northern France
- Rhineland
- Ardennes-Alsace
- Central Europe

Vietnam

- Counteroffensive, Phase II
- Counteroffensive, Phase III
- Tet Counteroffensive
- Counteroffensive, Phase IV
- Counteroffensive, Phase V
- Counteroffensive, Phase VI
- Tet 69/Counteroffensive
- Summer-Fall 1969
