= 56th Infantry Regiment (United States) =

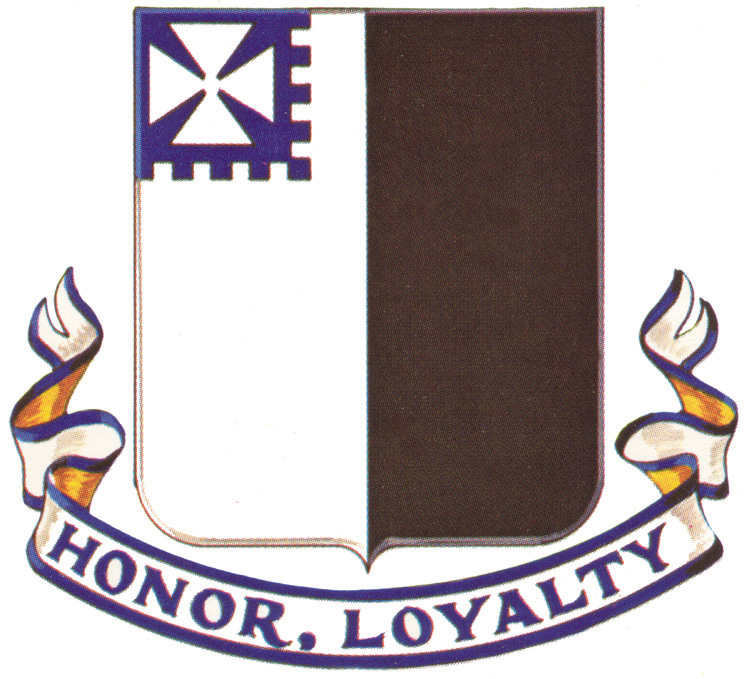
- Crest of the 56th Infantry Regiment (1917-1943)
- Active: 1917-1921; 1942-1943
- Country: United States
- Branch: United States Army
- Type: Infantry
- Role: Infantry
- Size: Regiment
- Mottos: "Honor, Loyalty"
- Engagements: World War I: Meuse-Argonne

Commanders
- Notable commanders: William P. Burnham

The 56th Infantry Regiment was a regular infantry regiment in the United States Army. It originated from personnel of the 17th Infantry Regiment in 1917 and fought in the region of Metz during World War I. It was reconstituted in 1942 as the 56th Armored Infantry Regiment and incorporated into the newly formed 12th Armored Division from which the 17th, 56th and 66th Armored Infantry Battalions were formed.

== History/Lineage ==
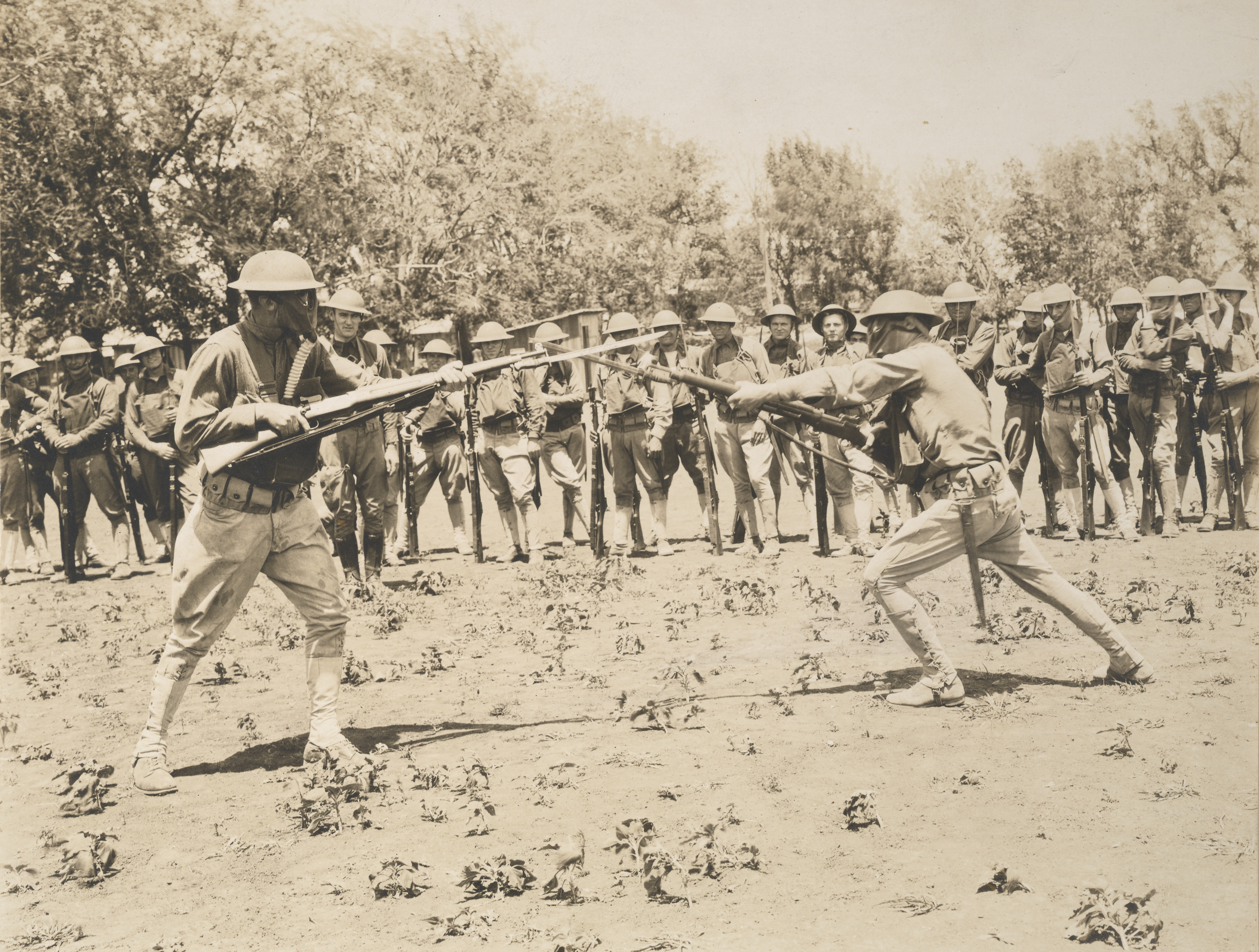
Doughboys of the 56th Infantry during bayonet practice at Camp MacArthur, Waco, Texas, July 17, 1918.

The 56th Armored Infantry Regiment traced its origin back to the 17th Infantry Regiment of Maj. Gen. George Sykes' 2nd Division of the 5th Army Corps, of the Army of the Potomac during the American Civil War. Personnel from the 17th Infantry Regiment formed the 56th Infantry Regiment on 15 May 1917 in the Regular Army under the command of William P. Burnham, and on 16 June it was organized at Fort Oglethorpe. On 16 November 1917, it was assigned to the 7th Division.

=== World War I ===
During the Meuse-Argonne campaign it was on the left bank of the Moselle River, the nearest American military unit to Metz, and was preparing to attack towards Metz when the armistice was signed. In April 1919 a battalion of the 56th entered Metz as an honor guard for the Commanding General of the American Expeditionary Forces, General John J. Pershing. For its actions during World War I, the regiment was awarded the campaign streamer 'Lorraine 1918'.

=== Interwar period ===
The regiment arrived at the port of New York in June 1919 and was transferred to Camp Mills, New York, where emergency period personnel were discharged from the service. It was transferred in July 1919 to Camp Funston, Fort Riley, Kansas, and transferred in July 1920 to Camp George G. Meade, Maryland. It was inactivated on 21 September 1921 at Camp George G. Meade, with personnel concurrently transferred to units of the 1st Division. The regiment was demobilized (disbanded) on 31 July 1922.

=== World War II ===
On 7 July 1942 the unit was reconstituted as the 56th Armored Infantry Regiment and assigned to the 12th Armored Division, which was activated as a division at Camp Campbell, Kentucky on 15 September 1942.

On 1 April 1943 the 56th Armored Infantry Regiment was given the special mission of guarding portion of the train route of President Franklin D. Roosevelt.

The regiment was reorganized as part of an effort to streamline U.S. armored units based on lessons learned from fighting in North Africa and Italy. In 1943, all armored divisions that had not been deployed to the European Theater of Operations were converted from heavy to light divisions. On 11 November 1943 while at the Tennessee Maneuver Area in Watertown, Tennessee, the 12th Armored Division was reorganized under the Authority and Orders TO&E 15 Sept 1943, G.O.#36 HQ 12th Armd Div, 11 Nov 1943, Letter HQ AGF, File 320.2/32 (Armd Div)(c) "Reorganization of Armored Divisions", dated 15 Sept 1943.

The 56th Armored Infantry Regiment was disbanded to form the 17th, 56th and 66th Armored Infantry Battalions of the 12th Armored Division:

- 1st Battalion of the 56th Armored Infantry Regiment became the 66th Armored Infantry Battalion
- 2nd Battalion of the 56th Armored Infantry Regiment became the 17th Armored Infantry Battalion
- 3rd Battalion of the 56th Armored Infantry Regiment became the 56th Armored Infantry Battalion
  - Companies G, H and I of the 3rd Bn, 56th Armored Infantry Regiment became Companies A, B and C of the 56th Armored Infantry Battalion

== Coat of Arms of the 56th Infantry Regiment and derivative Armored Infantry Battalions ==
Shield: Per pale argent and sable. On a canton embattled azure, a cross pate (sic) of the first (the 17th Infantry Regiment).

Description: The shield is silver and black, the same as the arms of the City of Metz, where the 56th Infantry Regiment was engaged in World War I as an element of the 7th Infantry Division. The 56th Infantry Regiment was formed from personnel of the 17th Infantry Regiment, which is indicated in the canton (upper left corner of the shield). During the American Civil War the 17th Infantry was in the 2nd Division, V Corps, Army of the Potomac under Gen. George Sykes, whose badge was a white cross pattée on a blue (azure) background. Its first engagement was the siege of Yorktown during the Peninsula Campaign of 1862, and it suffered heavy losses during the Battle of Fredericksburg where it was pinned down on 14 December 1862, behind a stone fence, represented by the embattled border (representing the top of a wall) around the cross.

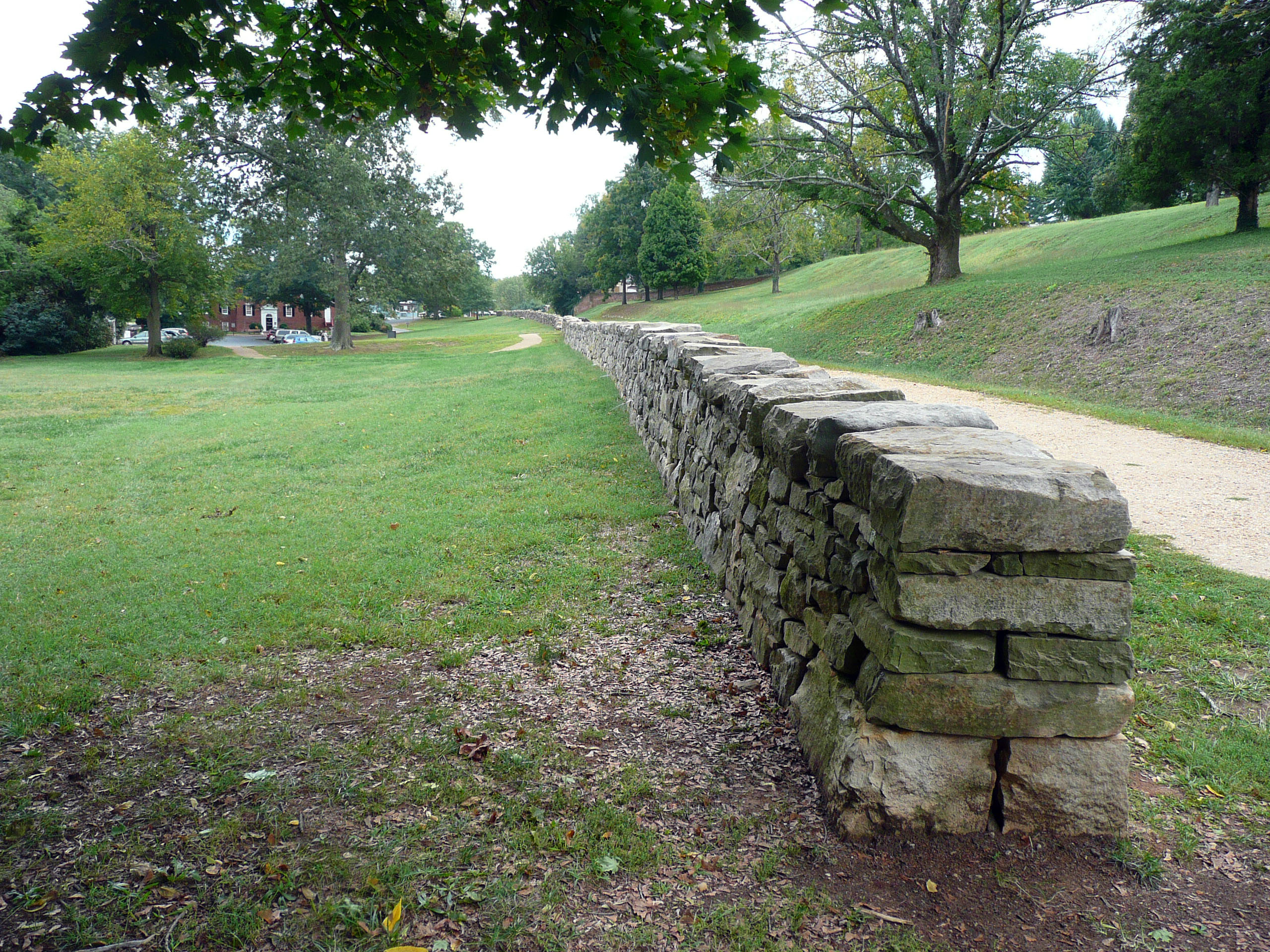
Stone wall at base of Marye’s Heights, where the Union 17th Regiment suffered heavy casualties during the Battle of Fredericksburg, 14 December 1862

At Fredericksburg the 17th suffered heavy losses in the assault on the famous stone wall at the base of Marye’s Height, "For one entire day, (December 14, 1862) the men of the 17th lay flat on their faces eighty yards in front of the famous stone wall, behind which the enemy was posted in large numbers and any movement on their part was sure to draw the fire of rebel sharpshooters."[7]

The 56th Armored Infantry Battalion was entitled to bear the coat of arms of its predecessor namesake organization, the 56th Armored Infantry Regiment, which was reconstituted from the deactivated 56th Infantry Regiment. Therefore, the shield of the 56th Armored Infantry Battalion is the same as the 56th Armored Infantry Regiment, and the 17th and 66th Armored Infantry Battalion shields are derived from the same pattern. The 56th, 17th and 66th Armored Infantry Battalions were all assigned to the 12th Armored Division during World War II.

Coat of Arms, City of Metz, France. Per pale argent and sable.

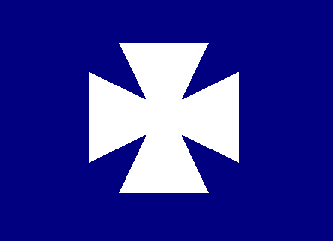
Badge of the 2nd Division, V Corps, Army of the Potomac. White cross pattée on azure field.

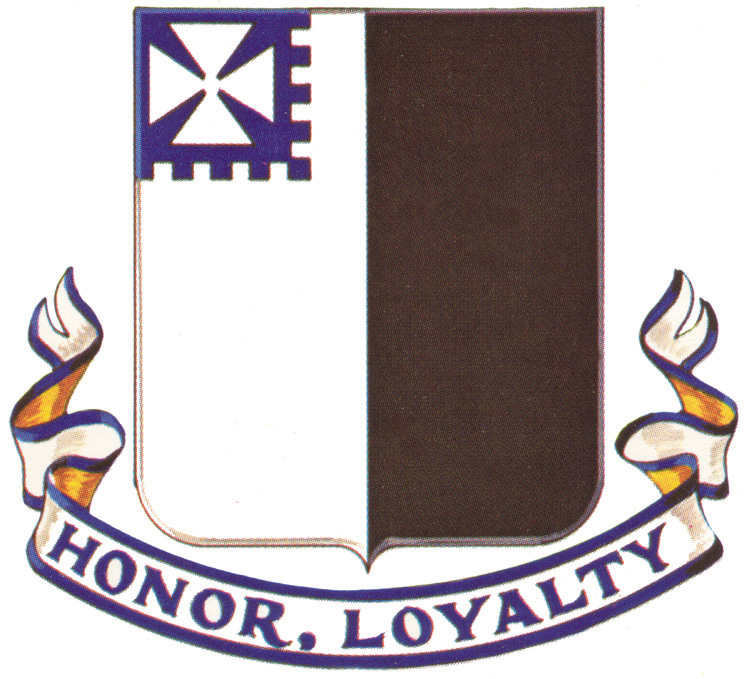
Coat of Arms of the 56th Armored Infantry Battalion (1943–46), the 56th Armored Infantry Regiment (1942-1943) and the 56th Infantry Regiment (1917-1942)

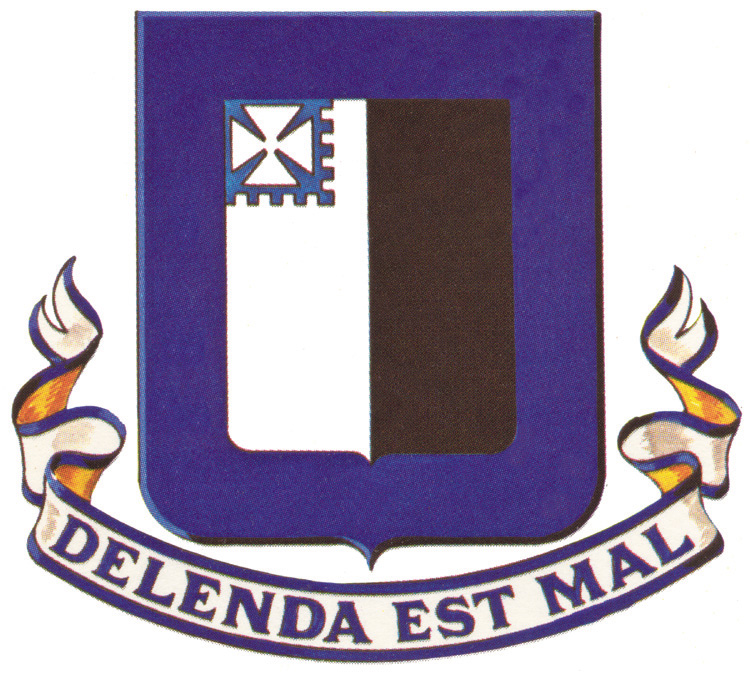
Coat of Arms of the 17th Armored Infantry Battalion - Motto "Evil must be Defeated"

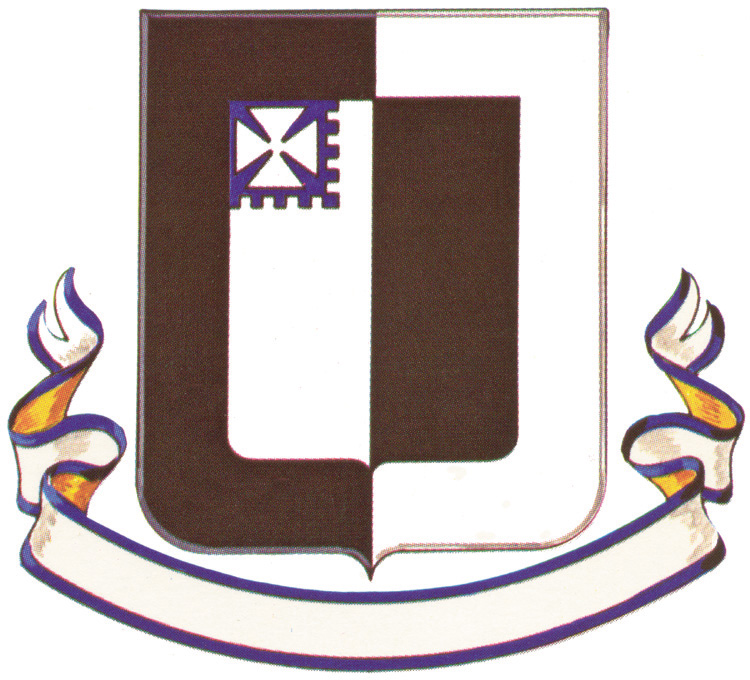
Coat of Arms of the 66th Armored Infantry Battalion

== See also ==
- 12th Armored Division (United States)
- 17th Infantry Regiment (United States)
- V Corps (Union Army)
- United States Army Institute of Heraldry
