= William P. Burnham =

United States Army general (1860–1930)

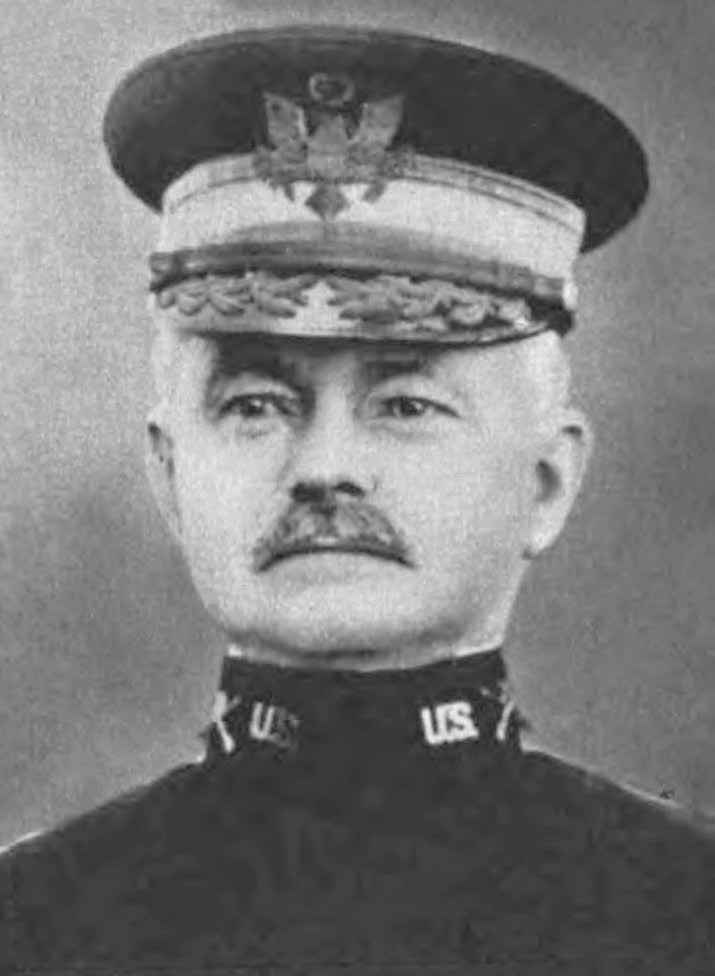
- William P. Burnham, pictured here as a major general and commander of the 82nd Division in October 1918.
- Born: January 10, 1860; Scranton, Pennsylvania, U.S.
- Died: September 27, 1930 (aged 70); San Francisco, California, U.S.
- Burial place: Arlington National Cemetery, Virginia, United States
- Military career
- Allegiance: United States
- Branch: United States Army
- Service years: 1880–1924
- Rank: Major General
- Service number: 0-132
- Unit: Infantry Branch
- Commands: Puerto Rican Regiment; 56th Regiment; 164th Infantry Brigade; 82nd Division; Fort McDowell; Presidio of San Francisco
- Conflicts: Spanish–American War; Philippine–American War; World War I
- Awards: Croix de Guerre (France); Legion of Honor (Officer) (France); Companion of the Order of the Bath (United Kingdom); Medal of Military Merit (Greece) (First Class)

William Power Burnham (January 10, 1860 − September 27, 1930) was a United States Army officer. During World War I, he was the commander of the 82nd Division, now the 82nd Airborne Division.

== Early life ==
William Power Burnham was born in Scranton, Pennsylvania, on January 10, 1860. His mother was Olive E. Burnham (1836–1921), and his father, David Roe Burnham (1835–1910), was a career army officer and American Civil War veteran who retired as a major. William P. Burnham attended the Kansas State Agricultural College (now Kansas State University) and then studied at the United States Military Academy (West Point) from 1877 to 1880.

== Start of military career ==
Burnham left West Point before graduating and enlisted in the United States Army's 14th Infantry Regiment. He attained the rank of sergeant before obtaining a commission as a second lieutenant of infantry in 1883.

Initially assigned to the 6th Infantry Regiment, he served at Fort Douglas and other posts in the western United States until 1889.

In 1889 Burnham attended the School of Application for Infantry and Cavalry (now the United States Army Command and General Staff College) at Fort Leavenworth. He graduated near the top of his class and was commended for authoring one of three prizewinning class essays, Military Training of the Regular Army.

Burnham later served with the 11th, 6th and 20th Infantry Regiments at posts including: Fort Porter, New York; St. John's Military Academy in Manlius, New York; and Fort Leavenworth. He was promoted to first lieutenant in 1891 and captain in 1898.

== Spanish–American War ==
During the Spanish–American War Burnham was promoted to temporary lieutenant colonel of Volunteers assigned to the 4th Missouri Volunteer Infantry Regiment. He served on the Second Corps staff as Inspector General.

== Post-Spanish–American War ==
During the Philippine–American War Burnham carried out staff assignments in the Philippines and at Fort Sheridan, Illinois. Later assignments included the Presidio, Jefferson Barracks, Fort Shafter, Fort Douglas, and San Juan, Puerto Rico. From February 1913 to August 1914 he was acting commandant of the United States Army Command and General Staff College. In early 1917 he commanded Camp Otis in the Panama Canal Zone.

According to some sources, Burnham can be credited with firing America's first shot in World War I. In March 1915, while he commanded the Puerto Rican Regiment at El Morro, Puerto Rico, the German supply ship Odenwald was docked in San Juan and preparing to put to sea. Burnham warned the German Consul and the ship's captain that he would use force if the captain attempted to leave without proper authority. The captain ignored the warning, and when he headed for the ocean, Burnham ordered the firing of a cannon across the ship's bow, which had the effect of forcing it to return to port.

== World War I ==
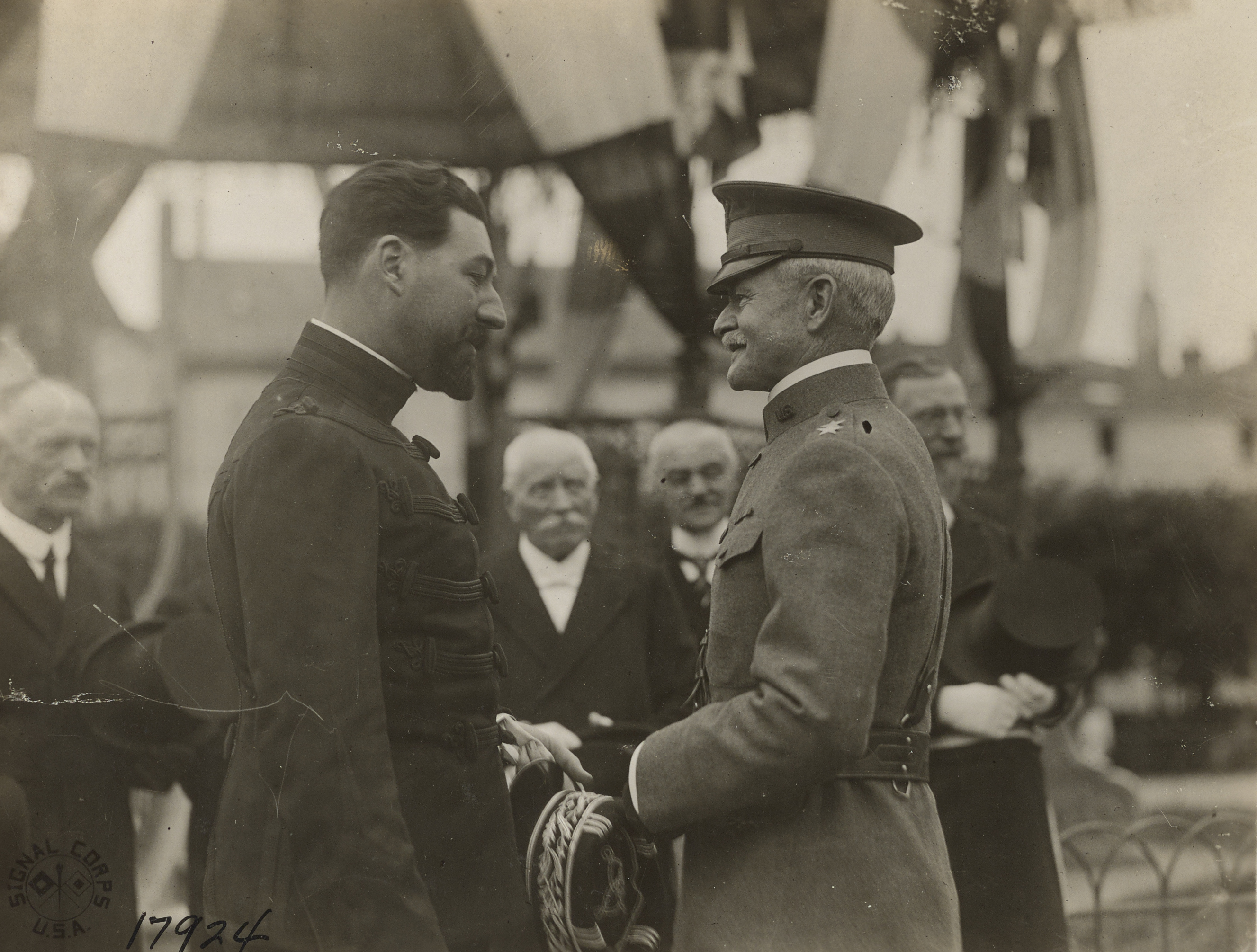
Major General William P. Burnham, commanding the 82nd Division, shaking the hand of the mayor of Toul, France, mid-1918.

In July 1917, three months after the American entry into World War I, Burnham was assigned to command the 56th Regiment at Camp Oglethorpe. In August he was promoted to command of the 164th Infantry Brigade at Camp Gordon as a brigadier general. Beginning in December, Burnham simultaneously commanded the 82nd Division during the period of its initial organization and activation. He is also credited with christening the organization as the "All-American Division," issuing an order saying that the nickname fit because the division of draftees, which included many recent immigrants, was composed of soldiers from all 48 states and so represented the best men from every state in the country.

Burnham commanded the 82nd Division during combat in France, including the St. Mihiel Offensive in mid-September and the start of the much larger Meuse–Argonne offensive which followed. In early October, he was suddenly relieved by American Expeditionary Forces (AEF) commander, General John J. Pershing, who wanted to create an opening for Major General George B. Duncan, a West Point classmate and friend. Duncan had previously commanded the 77th Division, and Pershing wanted to return him to divisional command. Furthermore, Pershing had already "made up his mind to relieve Burnham, who he felt was too timid with subordinate officers".

After leaving the 82nd Division Burnham was assigned as the U.S. military attaché in Athens, Greece. The armistice with Germany ended the war on November 11, 1918, and Burnham remained in Greece until July 1919.

== Post–World War I ==
After World War I, Burnham returned to his permanent rank of colonel. He commanded the discharge and replacement depot at Fort McDowell, from 1919 to 1922. In 1922 he was assigned to command the Presidio of San Francisco, where he remained until retiring.

== Career as author ==
During his military service Burnham prepared several articles for professional journals, including: Military Training of the Regular Army (1889); Three Roads to a Commission (1893); Duties of Outposts, Advance and Rear Guards (1893); Regulations of St. John’s Military School (1894); and Historical Sketch, Twentieth United States Infantry (1902).

== Retirement, death and burial ==
Burnham reached the mandatory retirement age of 64 in January 1924. On the day before his retirement, he was promoted to brigadier general. In retirement he resided in San Francisco. In June 1930, the U.S. Congress enacted legislation permitting World War I general officers to retire at their highest rank, and Burnham was advanced to major general on the retired list. He died in San Francisco on September 27, 1930. He was buried at Arlington National Cemetery, section 3, site 1804.

== Awards ==
His awards included:

=== United States ===
The Spanish Campaign, Army of Cuban Occupation, Philippine Campaign, and World War I Victory Medals.

=== Foreign ===
His foreign decorations included the British Order of the Bath, the Greek Medal of Military Merit (First Class) and the French Croix de Guerre and Legion of Honor (Officer).

== Family ==
Burnham was the son of Major David R. Burnham, a career Army officer who was a Union Army veteran of the American Civil War.

In 1890 Burnham married Grace Francesca Meacham (1869–1942), the daughter of an Army surgeon. They were the parents of one son and two daughters: Edward Meacham Burnham (1891–1976); Frances Meacham Burnham (1897–1975), the wife of Stephen Horace Curtis a doctor from Troy, New York; and Helen Meacham Burnham (born 1897), the twin sister of Frances and the first wife of Army officer Thomas F. Limbocker, who later lived near Frances Curtis in Albany and Brunswick.

Military offices
Preceded by James B. Erwin	Commanding General 82nd Division; 1917–1918	Succeeded by George B. Duncan
