= 21st Airship Group =

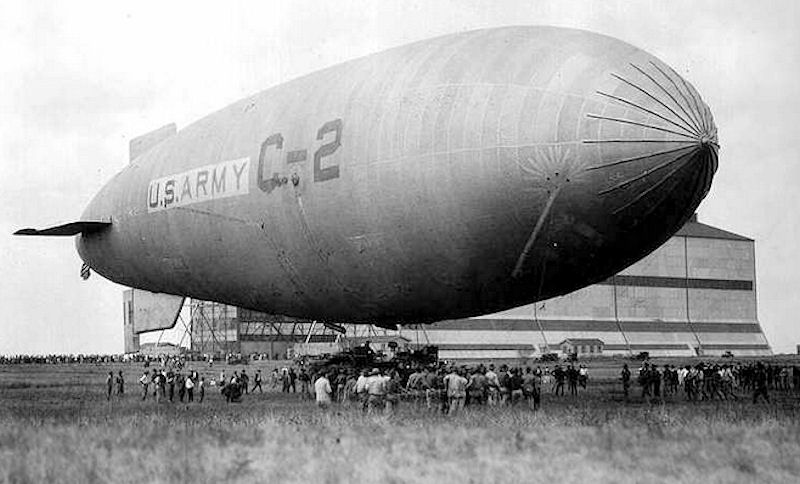
- A 1922 photo of the C-2 blimp at Brooks Field, Texas
- Active: 16 October 1917 – December 1918; 13 September 1921 – 1 June 1939
- Disbanded: 27 May 1939
- Country: United States
- Branch: Air Corps
- Type: Group
- Motto(s): Sic Itur ad Astra (Thus even to the Stars)
- Engagements: World War I

Insignia
- 21st Airship Group distinctive unit insigne (emblem approved 25 June 1924): 21st Airship Group - Emblem.png

The 21st Airship Group was a unit of the United States Army Air Corps. It was last assigned to the 3d Wing at Scott Field, Illinois. It was originally activated under a different name in 1921, and disbanded on 27 May 1939.

A predecessor of the group served on the Western Front in France during World War I. For most of the period between the two World Wars, the group was the only active lighter-than-air headquarters in the United States Army Air Service and, later, the United States Army Air Corps.

== History ==
The 2d Balloon Squadron, a predecessor of the group was activated during World War I and deployed to Western Front in France. The squadron was credited with participating in the Meuse-Argonne offensive (8–17 October 1918). The unit was demobilized as the I Corps Balloon Group in December 1918.

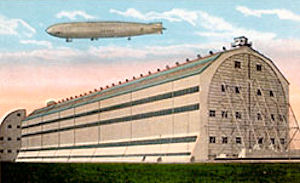
Postcard of Lighter-Than-Air ship hangar at Scott Field

The 1st Balloon Group was organized in the fall of 1921 to support the Air Service Balloon and Airship School at Brooks Field, San Antonio, Texas. However, a series of mishaps in operating the hydrogen-filled craft led to the transfer of the school from Brooks to Scott Field, Illinois, on 26 June 1922. Lighter-than-air ships were used at Scott Field to research the capabilities of aerial photography, meteorology and conduct altitude experiments. In the late 1920s, the emphasis shifted from airships to balloons. Airplanes began to dominate activities at Scott Field, and in the late 1930s, the lighter-than-air activities there came to an end.

== Lineage ==
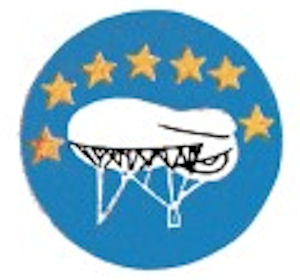
2d Balloon Squadron emblem

I Corps Balloon Group

- Organized as the 2d Balloon Squadron on 25 September 1917

Redesignated Company A, Balloon Wing, First Army on 19 June 1918
Redesignated I Corps Balloon Group on 8 October 1918

- Demobilized in December 1918.
- Reconstituted on 20 November 1936 and consolidated with the 21st Airship Group as the 21st Airship Group

21st Balloon Group

- Constituted in the Regular Army as the 1st Balloon Group on 13 September 1921

Redesignated 1st Airship Group on 3 January 1922.
Redesignated 21st Airship Group on 1 January 1923

- Consolidated on 20 November 1936 with the I Corps Balloon Group

Redesignated as 21st Balloon Group on 1 June 1937.
Disbanded on 27 May 1939

=== Assignments ===
- Undetermined, 15 September 1917
- 1st Air Depot, AEF, 3 January 1918
- Balloon Wing, First Army, 19 June 1918
- I Corps, 8 October-8 December 1918
- Zone of the Interior, 13 September 1921
- Air Service Balloon and Airship School (later Air Corps Balloon and Airship School). 3 January 1922
- General Headquarters Reserve, 8 May 1929
- General Headquarters Air Force, 1 October 1933
- Sixth Corps Area, 12 August 1936
- 3d Wing, 19 February – 1 June 1939

=== Components ===
- 8th Airship Company 1921–1933
- 9th Airship Company 1921–1933
- 9th Airship Squadron 1933–1937
- 12th Airship Company 1921–1933
- 16th Airship Company 1921–1933
- 19th Airship Squadron 1933–1937
- 1st Balloon Company, 1918
- 2d Balloon Company, 1918
- 3d Balloon Company, 1918
- 1st Balloon Squadron 1937–1939
- 2d Balloon Squadron 1937–1939
- 3d Balloon Squadron 1937–1939
- 24th Airship Service Company 1921–1933
- 24th Airship Service Squadron 1933–1937
- 24th Service Squadron 1937–1939
- 21st Photo Section 1922-1937

=== Stations ===
- Fort Omaha, Nebraska, 25 September 1917
- Garden City, Long Island New York, September 1917
- Camp de Souge, Orléanaise, France, 3 January 1918 – 5 April 1918
- Brouville, Lorraine, France, 15 April 1918
- La Ferté-sous-Jouarre, Lorraine, France, 19 June 1918 through August 1918
- Toul, Lorraine, France, by September 1918
- Saizerais, Lorraine, France, 19 September 1918
- Colombey-les-Belles Airdrome, Meuse-Argonne Sector, France, c 8 October–December 1918
- Brooks Field, Texas, 13 September 1921
- Scott Field, Illinois, 1 July 1922 – 1 June 1939

== Bibliography ==
- Clay, Steven E. (2011). US Army Order of Battle 1919–1941 (PDF). Vol. 3 The Services: Air Service, Engineers, and Special Troops 1919–1941. Fort Leavenworth, KS: Combat Studies Institute Press. ISBN 978-0-98419-014-0. LCCN 2010022326. OCLC 637712205. Archived from the original (PDF) on 27 September 2013.
