= 165th Infantry Brigade (United States) =

165th Infantry Brigade (Training)
- Shoulder sleeve insignia
- Active: 1917–1945; 1946–1959; 1963–1965; 2007–present
- Country: United States
- Branch: United States Army
- Role: Training
- Size: Brigade
- Part of: United States Army Training Center
- Garrison/HQ: Fort Jackson
- Battle honours: World War I World War II

Commanders
- Current commander: Col. Joshua M . Betty
- Command Sergeant Major: CSM James Cox
- Notable commanders: Willard Ames Holbrook

Insignia
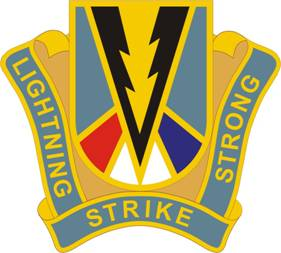
- 165th Infantry Brigade DUI

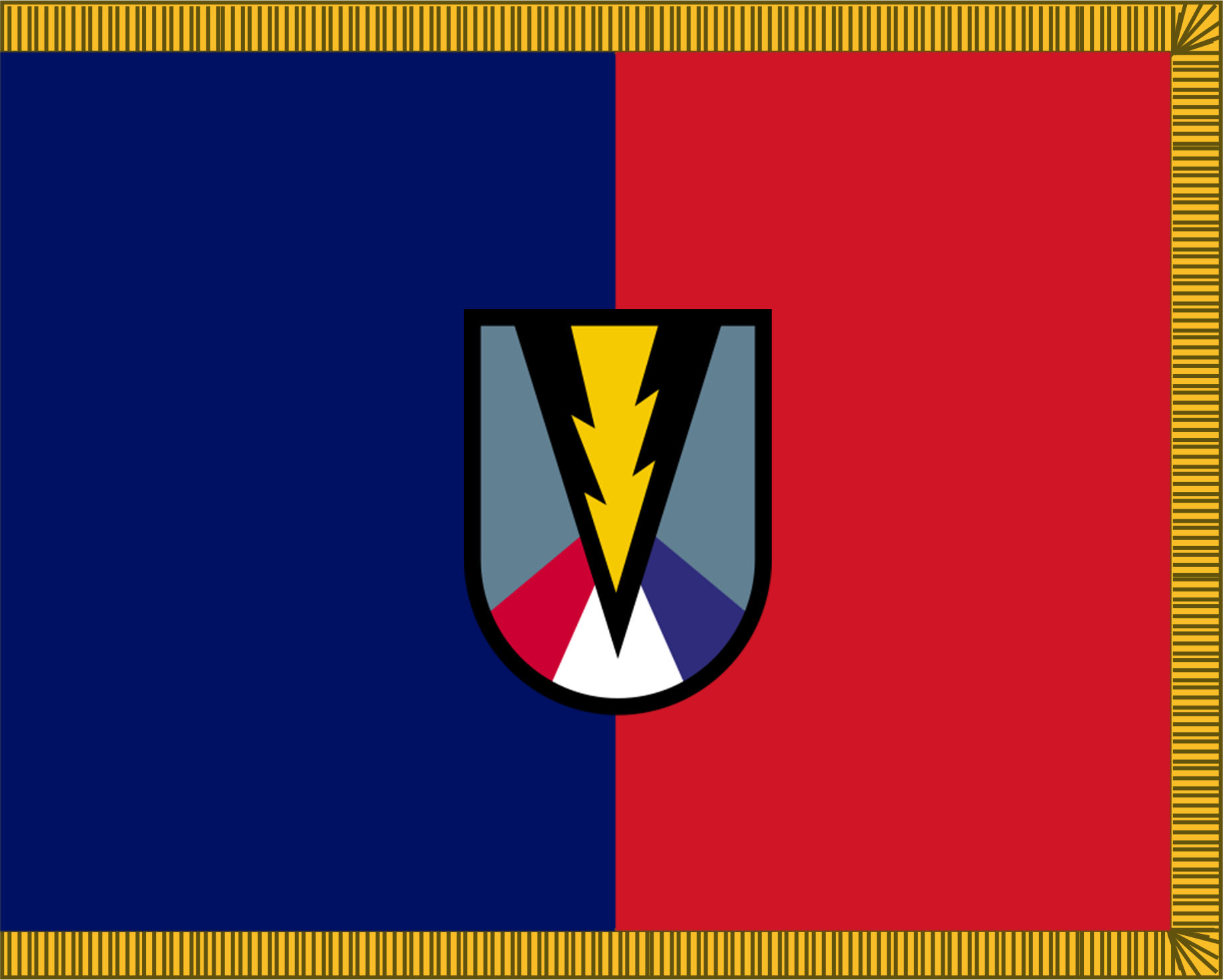
- 165th Infantry Brigade Flag

The 165th Infantry Brigade is a brigade of the United States Army. It no longer serves a combat role, and instead is a training unit of the United States Army at the United States Army Training Center at Fort Jackson, South Carolina.

== History ==
=== World War I ===
The 165th Infantry Brigade, constituted 5 August 1917 in the National Army as headquarters, 165th Infantry Brigade, and assigned to the 83rd Division. Organized 25 August 1917 at Camp Sherman, Ohio, and demobilized 12 February 1919 at Camp Sherman, Ohio.

The unit was reconstituted 24 June 1921 in the Organized Reserves as headquarters and Headquarters Company, 165th Infantry Brigade, and assigned to the 83rd Division. Organized in November 1921 at Columbus, Ohio. Redesignated 23 March 1925 as Headquarters and headquarters Company, 165th Brigade. The location of the garrison was changed 22 March 1934 to Dayton, Ohio, then Redesignated 24 August 1936 as headquarters and Headquarters Company, 165th Infantry Brigade.

=== World War II ===
Converted and redesignated 23 February 1942 as the 83rd Reconnaissance Troop (less 3rd Platoon), 83rd division Headquarters and Headquarters Company, 165th infantry Brigade, concurrently converted and redesignated as the 3rd Platoon, 83rd reconnaissance Troop, 83 Division. Troop ordered into active military service 15 August 1942 and reorganized at Camp Atterbury, Indiana, as the 83rd Cavalry reconnaissance Troop, and element of the 83rd Infantry division. Reorganized and redesignated 12 August 1943 as the 83rd Reconnaissance troop, Mechanized. Inactivated 23 March 1945 at Camp Kilmer, New Jersey.

=== Cold War ===
During the Cold War, the unit underwent more changes. On 28 October 1946, it was redesignated as the 83rd Mechanized Cavalry Reconnaissance Troop and Activated 14 November 1946 as the 83rd Mechanized Cavalry Reconnaissance troop at Cleveland, Ohio. It was then Organized Reserves re-designated 25 March 1948 as the Organized Reserve Corps; redesignated 9 July 1952 as the Army reserve, and later reorganized and redesignated 15 August 1949 as the 83rd Reconnaissance Company. Location changed 21 April 1954 to Athens, Ohio; on 7 April 1956 to Toledo, Ohio, and later Inactivated on 20 March 1959 at Toledo, Ohio.

Converted and redesignated (less 3rd Platoon) 27 March 1963 as headquarters and headquarters Company, 2nd Brigade, 83rd Infantry Division (3rd Platoon, 83rd reconnaissance Company – hereafter separated lineage).

The unit saw one last period of activity during the Cold War. It was activated 15 April 1963 at Columbus, Ohio and then inactivated 31 December 1965 at Columbus, Ohio

=== Today ===
The unit was again activated on 26 January 2007 as headquarters and Headquarters Company, 165th Infantry Brigade and transferred to the United States Army Training and Doctrine Command; Headquarters concurrently activated at Fort Jackson, South Carolina to serve as a Training Brigade.

== Order of battle ==
- Headquarters and Headquarters Company (HHC)
- 1st Battalion, 34th Infantry Regiment
- 3rd Battalion, 34th Infantry Regiment
- 2nd Battalion, 39th Infantry Regiment
- 3rd Battalion, 39th Infantry Regiment
- 4th Battalion, 39th Infantry Regiment
- 1st Battalion, 61st Infantry Regiment

== Campaign participation credit ==
- World War I (Streamer without inscription)
- World War II
  - Normandy
  - Northern France
  - Rhineland
  - Ardennes-Alsace
  - Central Europe
