= William H. Burnham =

American educational psychologist

William H. Burnham (1855–1941) was an American educational psychologist, who was a major advocate for promoting good mental hygiene in the education system. He defined this as taking measures to prevent mental problems or disorders to help students learn more effectively.

== Biography ==
William H. Burnham was born in Dunbarton, New Hampshire in 1855. He received his bachelor's degree from Harvard in 1882, and his doctorate from Johns Hopkins in 1888. He was then recruited by G. Stanley Hall to teach at Clark University, where he stayed until he retired in 1926. Burnham and Hall worked closely with each other at both Johns Hopkins and Clark studying the education system and development of children.

America was recovering from the Civil War and was in the core of the second industrial revolution while Burnham was in school. During this time there was an increased demand for better education. People were upset and dissatisfied with how secondary schools and colleges were only focusing on producing diplomas and not ‘capable men’. As a result, there was a shift in education to focus on the individual development of the student and not just the information they were learning. Since this was Burnham's area of expertise, he was inspired to study and observe this situation to help improve the education system. He wrote numerous books about how to improve the education system, and how the student as a whole should be the primary concern of teachers and the school.

== Contributions ==
William H. Burnham observed how secondary schools and colleges were primarily concerned about the scholarship product of an individual, and not on how the individual was personally growing. He created guidelines and principles to create a new path of education. He wrote his notes, results, and conclusions into published books and articles. Some of these books are: The History of Education as a Professional Subject, Bibliographies on Educational Psychology, The Normal Mind, and The Group as a Stimulus of Mental Activity. Throughout these books, it is easy to understand that Burnham saw hygiene as a basic and necessary component of education. In these books explained how mental hygiene could be improved and how to achieve it so that all students are successful.

Burnham said that the first step to improvement in mental hygiene is to educate the teachers on the principles of mental health and how to teach it to children. He was determined to teach educators that their main goal should be to promote good mental hygiene in their students and not only focus on their education. Through a questionnaire he gave to students, teachers, and school administrators, Burnham found that teachers also suffered from poor mental health. He identified that the cause was a lack of knowledge and the fact that they had too many students in their classes. He concluded that a reduction in class size, proper training on mental hygiene, and additional time to give their attention to the subject would result in better mental health for both teachers and students.

Once the teachers were better equipped to teach and promote good mental hygiene in students, schools could then emphasize mental hygiene and implement actions to make it happen. In one of his books, The Hygiene of Home Study, Burnham states that giving children work to do at home hinders the child's individual growth. He explains how home is a place where a child is supposed to explore and develop their individual personality, sending home assignments will result in poorer mental hygiene since they have inadequate time to develop and focus on themselves outside of school. He also highlighted how homework negatively effects performance of the work being done, which he mentions in The Hygiene of Home Study but goes into more detail in The Group as a Mental Stimulus. Burnham explains how studies have shown that individuals perform better when working in a group setting, compared to alone. This suggests that a student's results from home study are inferior to the results achieved if completed in a classroom with peers.

Another issue Burnham addressed in his most cited book, The Normal Mind, was that to have good mental hygiene, one must have maximum freedom. He explains that everyone is born with good mental health and it is the environment they grow up in, along with their parent's behavior, that can cause it to deteriorate. He recommends that society, and more specifically parents, should actually take a step back from their kids and let their children make decisions for themselves because control hinders development and good mental health. Leave children alone and stop trying to ‘ruin’ childhood with adult problems and issues, instead allow them to develop naturally.

== Lasting effects ==
Burnham was a major advocate and publicist for mental hygiene. He was a pioneer and huge supporter of mental hygiene, so his death was a major loss.
