= Thomas H. Rees =

United States Army general (1863–1942)

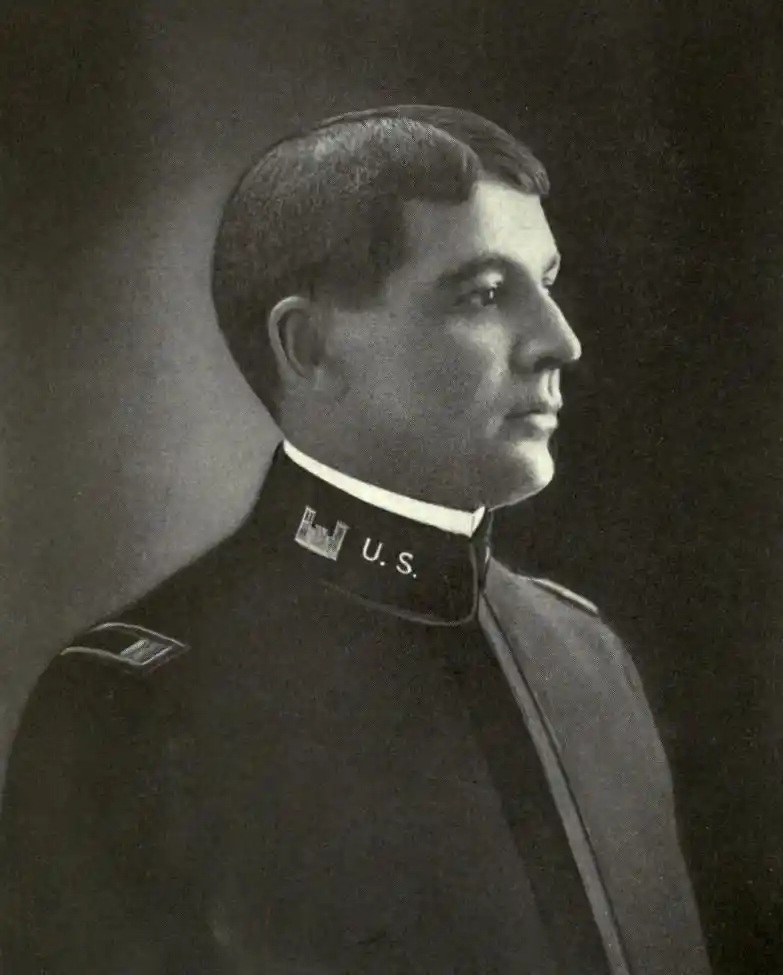
- Rees as a captain, c. 1905
- Born: Thomas Henry Rees; 18 October 1863; Houghton, Michigan, U.S.
- Died: 20 September 1942 (aged 78); Washington, D.C., U.S.
- Burial place: Arlington National Cemetery
- Education: United States Military Academy; United States Army War College
- Spouse(s): Frances Grier Happersett (m. 1889–1906) Blanche Adele (Baxter) Jones (m. 1907–1932)
- Children: 5
- Relatives: Robert I. Rees (brother)
- Military career
- Service: United States Army
- Service years: 1886–1922
- Rank: Brigadier General
- Service number: 0-155
- Unit: United States Army Corps of Engineers
- Commands: Engineer Battalion, Fifth Army Corps; Company C, Battalion of Engineers; Tampa, Florida Engineer District; Company A, 1st Engineer Battalion; Department of Engineering, US Army Infantry and Cavalry School; 1st Engineer Battalion; 3rd Engineer Battalion; Engineer District of Chicago; California Debris Commission; Provisional Artillery Brigade, Fort Sill; 152nd Field Artillery Brigade; Camp Jackson; Southeastern Engineer Division
- Wars: Spanish–American War; World War I
- Awards: Legion of Honor (Officer) (France)

Thomas Henry Rees (18 October 1863 – 20 September 1942) was a career officer in the United States Army. A veteran of the Spanish–American War and World War I, he served from 1886 to 1922 and attained the rank of brigadier general.

A native of Houghton, Michigan, Rees graduated from the United States Military Academy at West Point in 1886 and was commissioned in the Corps of Engineers. He performed rivers and harbors construction and maintenance throughout the United States, and served in Cuba during the Spanish–American War. A highly regarded instructor, Rees taught at both West Point and the Command and General Staff College. During World War I, he commanded the 152nd Field Artillery Brigade of the 77th Division during its organization and training, then served as deputy chief engineer of the American Expeditionary Forces.

After the war, Rees commanded Engineer units until 1922, when hearing loss led to his retirement for disability. In retirement, he lived first in France, and later in Washington, D.C. Rees died in Washington on 20 September 1942. He was buried at Arlington National Cemetery.

== Early life ==
Thomas Henry Rees was born in Houghton, Michigan on 18 October 1863, a son of Seth Rees and Eugenie (Livermore) Rees. Among his siblings was Robert Irwin Rees (1871–1936), who also served as a brigadier general in the US Army. He was raised and educated in Houghton, and completed high school at the Rock School in 1880. Rees received his teaching credentials and taught school in Aurelius Township while residing in residing in Williamston. He undertook the application process for the United States Military Academy at West Point while teaching school and attending Michigan State University, and in November 1881 received an appointment from U.S. Representative Oliver L. Spaulding. Rees attended West Point beginning in 1882, and graduated 1886 ranked fourth in his class. So many members of the Class of 1886 attained general officer rank – 25 of 77, or 33.7 percent – that it was nicknamed "The class the stars fell on." This title was later applied to the Class of 1915 because so many of its members served as general officers in the Second World War. Among the members of the class of 1886 who became generals was John J. Pershing. (Note: The complete list includes: Henry C. Newcomer; Mason Patrick; Thomas Henry Rees; Lucien Grant Berry; Frank McIntyre; John E. McMahon; Avery D. Andrews; Charles T. Menoher; Albert Decatur Kniskern; Charles C. Walcutt Jr.; John J. Pershing; Peter E. Traub; Benjamin A. Poore; Jesse McI. Carter; Chauncey Brooke Baker; Malvern Hill Barnum; William H. Hay; James H. McRae; Walter Henry Gordon; Arthur Johnson; Frank L. Winn; Charles Clarendon Ballou; George B. Duncan; Lucius Loyd Durfee; Julius Penn; and Edward Mann Lewis. Among his prominent classmates who did not attain general's rank was Bertram T. Clayton.)

Rees's high class standing enabled him to obtain a second lieutenant's commission in the first choice of most-high ranking graduates, the United States Army Corps of Engineers. His initial posting was to the Engineer Battalion at Fort Totten, New York, where he was a student at the Engineer School of Application. In 1889, he performed temporary flood control and disaster relief duty following the Johnstown Flood. From 1889 to 1893, he was assistant engineer for the River and Harbor District of Savannah, Georgia, and he was promoted to first lieutenant in April 1890. From April to August 1893, he served as assistant engineer officer to Colonel David C. Houston and later Lieutenant Colonel Henry Martyn Robert as they planned and oversaw construction of river and harbor improvements in New York Harbor and on Long Island Sound.

== Continued career ==
From August 1893 to June 1896, Rees was assigned to the West Point faculty as instructor of civil and military engineering, and he was an assistant professor from June 1896 to April 1898. During the 1898 Spanish–American War, he served in Cuba with the Engineer Battalion of the Fifth Army Corps, and he was promoted to captain in July. He commanded the battalion in August, and after returning to the United States in September, he commanded the battalion's Company C at Fort Totten from September 1898 to December 1899.

Rees oversaw improvements to defensive works and waterways as chief engineer of the Tampa, Florida Engineer District from December 1899 to August 1901. He commanded Company A, 1st Engineer Battalion at Fort Totten, and later Fort Leavenworth, Kansas from August to July 1902. Rees was in charge of the Department of Engineering at the Infantry and Cavalry School and Command and General Staff College from July 1902 to July 1905. He received promotion to major in July 1904. He commanded the 1st Engineer Battalion from April to September 1905, when he was assigned to command the 3rd Engineer Battalion, which he led until August 1908.

== Later career ==
From August 1908 to September 1910, Rees was assigned as chief engineer of the Engineer District of Chicago. From September 1910 to June 1911, he was a student at the United States Army War College, and he was promoted to lieutenant colonel in February 1911. From June 1911 to March 1917, Rees served as engineer officer for the Corps of Engineers North Pacific Division and senior member of the California Debris Commission, a three-member panel charged with improving northern California rivers and streams that had been rendered unnavigable by sediment from unregulated gold mining. In July 1916, he was promoted to colonel. From March to December 1917, Rees served as department and division engineer in the Philippines, and was based in Manila.

As the army expanded following U.S. entry into World War I, in December 1917 Rees was promoted to temporary brigadier general. He returned to the United States in early 1918, and in February was assigned to command a provisional Field Artillery brigade them being organized at Fort Sill, Oklahoma. In April, he was appointed to command the 152nd Field Artillery Brigade, a unit of the 77th Division then undergoing training at Camp Upton, New York. He led this unit as it completed its organization and training in France, and in August was reassigned as deputy chief engineer of the American Expeditionary Forces. Rees was also responsible for organizing a three-month course in engineering for U.S. officers as part of the American army university that was established in Beaune. He returned to the United States in December and was assigned to command of the post at Camp Jackson, South Carolina. Rees's wartime service was recognized by the government of France, which awarded him the Legion of Honor (Officer).

In January 1919, Rees was appointed chief engineer of the Corps of Engineers Southeastern Division, which was based in Savannah, Georgia. In February 1919, he was reduced to his permanent rank of colonel. From March 1920 to November 1921, he served as engineer officer for the Ninth Corps Area in San Francisco. He commanded the 3rd Engineer Battalion in Hawaii from November 1921 to November 1922. In December 1922, Rees was diagnosed with hearing loss and retired for disability. A law passed in June 1930 enabled the general officers of the First World War to retire at their highest rank, and Rees was advanced to brigadier general on the retired list.

When in San Francisco, Rees was a member of The Family and the Bohemian Club. In retirement, he was a resident of France, with residences in Paris and Gouvieux. He traveled extensively and also became an accomplished woodworker; in addition to building home furniture, he also constructed a boat. After the death of his first wife in 1932 Rees resided in Washington, D.C. He died in Washington on 20 September 1942 and was buried at Arlington National Cemetery.

== Works by ==
- "The Engineer Battalion of the Fifth Army Corps". Journal of the Military Service Institution of the United States. Vol. XXIV. Governors Island, New York: Military Service Institution of the United States. 1899. pp. 74–84 – via Google Books.
- Topographical Surveying and Sketching. Fort Leavenworth, Kansas: U.S. Army Service Schools. 1908 – via Google Books.

== Dates of rank ==
Rees's dates of rank were:

- Second Lieutenant (Additional), 1 July 1886
- Second Lieutenant, 31 December 1886
- First Lieutenant, 1 April 1890
- Captain, 5 July 1898
- Major, 11 July 1904
- Lieutenant Colonel, 27 February 1911
- Colonel, 1 July 1916
- Brigadier General (National Army), 4 January 1918
- Colonel, 6 February 1919
- Colonel (Retired), 31 December 1922
- Brigadier General (Retired), 21 June 1930
