= Lucius Loyd Durfee =

United States Army general

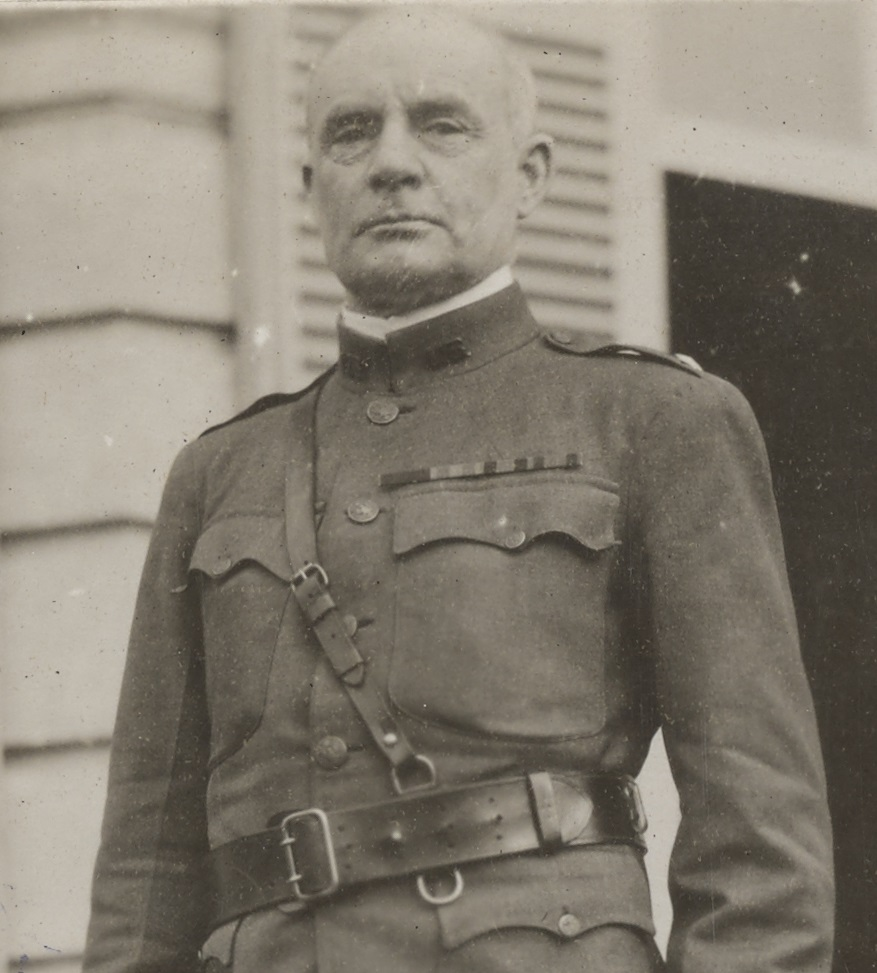
- Brigadier General Lucius Durfee, commanding the 54th Brigade Montfort, France, 1918.
- Born: March 3, 1861; Chardon, Ohio, United States
- Died: March 19, 1933 (aged 72); Riverside, California, United States
- Spouse: Fannie Morris Van Horne
- Children: 5 (including L. V. H. Durfee)
- Military career
- Allegiance: United States
- Branch: United States Army
- Service years: 1886–1920
- Rank: Brigadier General
- Service number: 0-13432
- Unit: Infantry Branch
- Commands: 77th Brigade; 12th Brigade
- Conflicts: Ghost Dance War; Spanish–American War; Moro Rebellion; Border War (1910–19); World War I
- Awards: Silver Star; Croix de Guerre; Legion of Honour

Brigadier General Lucius Loyd Durfee (March 3, 1861 – March 19, 1933) was a United States Army officer in the late 19th and early 20th centuries.

== Early life and education ==
Durfee was born on March 3, 1861, in Chardon, Ohio. After attending school in Chardon, he taught school for one or two years. Durfee won an appointment to the United States Military Academy, and he graduated 67 of 77 in 1886. Among his classmates included several men who would become general officers, such as John J. Pershing, Mason Patrick, Jesse McI. Carter, Walter Henry Gordon, George B. Duncan, Charles T. Menoher, Edward Mann Lewis, John E. McMahon, Ernest Hinds, William H. Hay, Avery D. Andrews, James McRae, Julius Penn and Lucien Grant Berry.

== Military career ==
Durfee was commissioned into the 17th Infantry Regiment and was stationed at Fort D.A. Russell in Wyoming. He served on border duty until 1893, and he participated in the Ghost Dance War. Durfee served with distinction during the Siege of Santiago as a first lieutenant, and he received a Silver Star for his role in the Battle of El Caney. Between 1899 and 1905, Durfee went to the Philippines three times and served on several minor campaigns as well as the Third Sulu Expedition. Durfee served in several locations in the U.S., including at Fort McPherson, Fort Brady, Fort Wayne, as well as on the border with Mexico. After graduating from the United States Army War College, Durfee remained at the institution as an instructor, and in 1918 he became part of the General Staff and became chief of staff for the Southern Department.

Durfee was promoted to the rank of brigadier general on June 26, 1918, and he took his brigade to France later that year due to World War I. While in France, the country's government awarded him the Croix de Guerre and the Legion of Honour. After returning to the U.S. in June 1919, Durfee commanded the 6th Infantry Division at Camp Grant in Illinois.

In November 1919, Durfee caught flu and pneumonia, and he never fully recovered. He retired from the army on April 14, 1920. After living in Zanesville, Ohio, for five years, Durfee moved to Los Angeles, and two years later he moved to Riverside, California. He died in Riverside on March 19, 1933, aged 62.

== Personal life ==
Durfee was a member of the Ohio Sons of the American Revolution, tracing his ancestry to Ebenezer Hopkins and Ebenezer Durfey.

== Bibliography ==
- Davis, Henry Blaine Jr. (1998). Generals in Khaki. Raleigh, North Carolina: Pentland Press. ISBN 1571970886. OCLC 40298151.
