= Frank L. Winn =

American Army general (1864–1941)

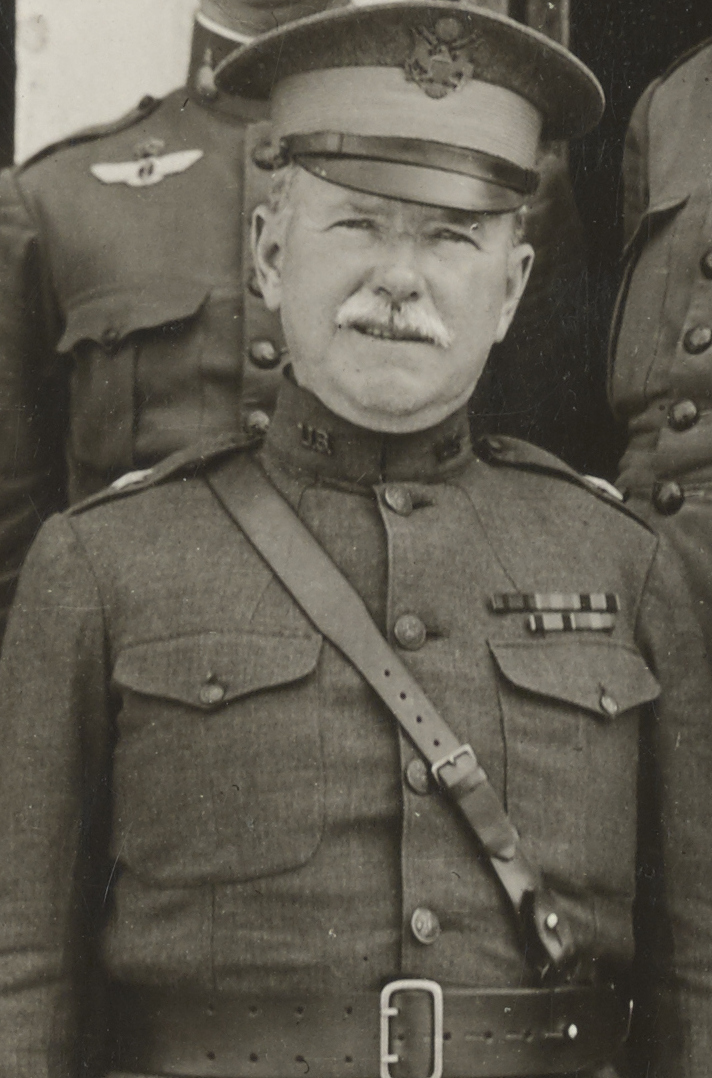
- Born: 4 October 1864; Winchester, Kentucky, United States
- Died: 24 February 1941 (aged 76); Palo Alto, California, United States
- Military career
- Allegiance: United States
- Branch: United States Army
- Service years: 1886–1922
- Rank: Major General
- Service number: 0-164
- Unit: Infantry Branch
- Commands: 8th Infantry Brigade; 4th Coast Artillery District; 37th Infantry Regiment; 89th Division; 177th Infantry Brigade; 24th Infantry Regiment
- Conflicts: Pine Ridge Campaign; Spanish–American War; Philippine–American War; Mexican Punitive Expedition; World War I
- Awards: Army Distinguished Service Medal; Silver Star (2)

Major General Frank Long Winn (4 October 1864 – 24 February 1941) was a United States Army officer who commanded the 177th Infantry Brigade and the 89th Division in France during the final months of World War I.

== Early life and education ==
Winn was born and raised in Winchester, Kentucky. He studied at Centre College in Danville, Kentucky for a year before entering the United States Military Academy in July 1882. While at Centre College he was initiated into the Sigma Chi Fraternity. Winn graduated 62nd in a class of 77 in July 1886 and was commissioned as an infantry officer. Many of his classmates became general officers later. For example: John J. Pershing, Avery D. Andrews, Chauncey B. Baker, Charles C. Ballou, Malvern H. Barnum, Jesse McI. Carter, George B. Duncan, William H. Hay, Arthur Johnson, Albert D. Kniskern, Edward M. Lewis, Frank McIntyre, John E. McMahon, James McRae, Charles T. Menoher, Thomas B. Mott, Henry C. Newcomer, Mason Patrick, Julius Penn, Benjamin A. Poore, Thomas H. Rees, Peter E. Traub, Walter Henry Gordon and Charles C. Walcutt Jr.. He later attended the Field Officers' Course at the Army School of the Line from January to April 1915 and graduated from the Army War College in May 1916.

== Military career ==
Winn served with the 1st Infantry in Nevada and California until April 1893. He was sent to South Dakota with the regiment in 1890 during the Pine Ridge Campaign.

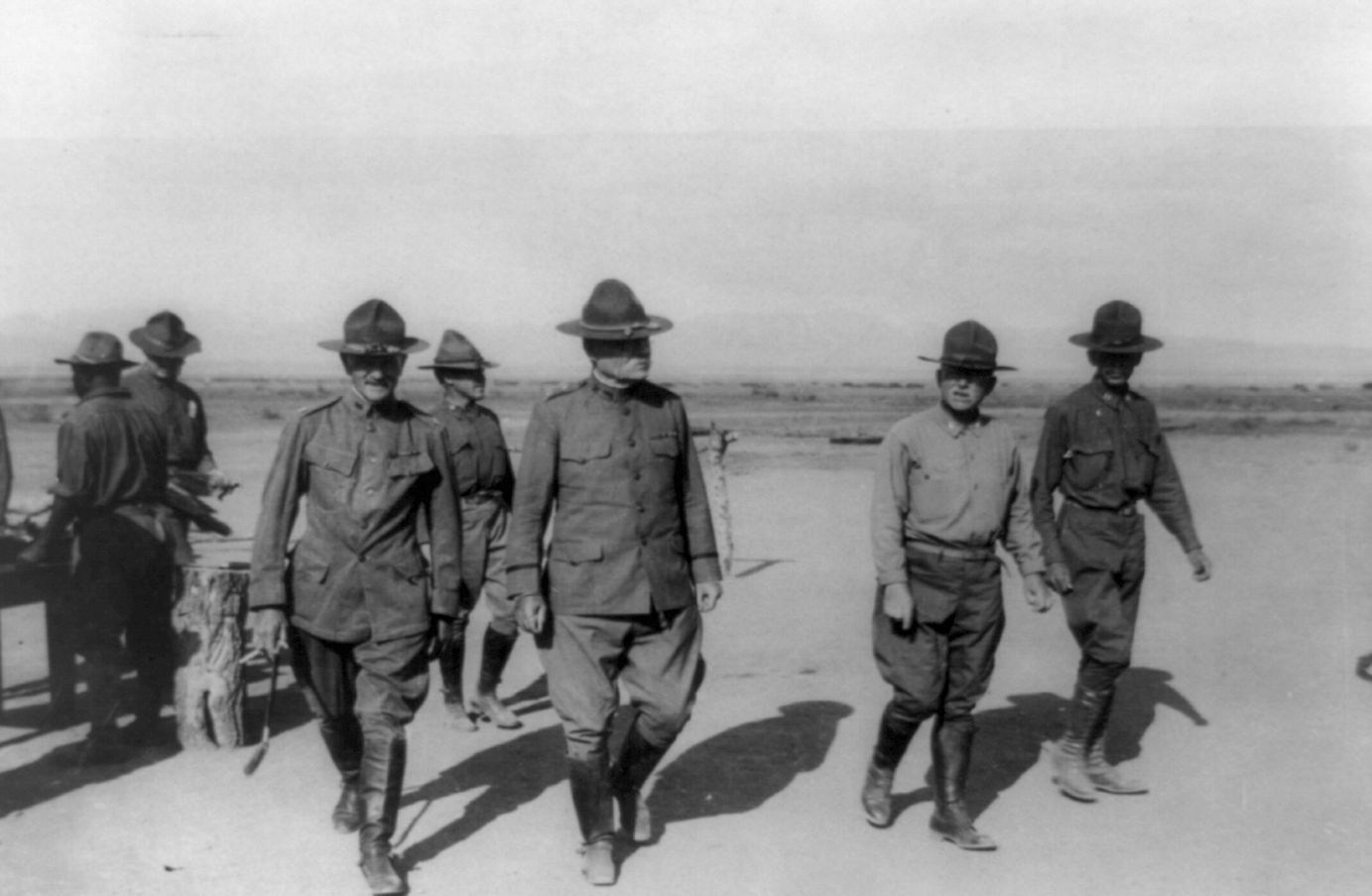
Brigadier General John J. Pershing and Major General Tasker H. Bliss inspecting the camp, with Colonel Winn, commanding the 24th Infantry, 1916.

Winn was assigned to the 12th Infantry from April 1893 to June 1909. From August 1893 to August 1897, he taught military science and tactics at the University of California, Berkeley. His regiment was sent to Cuba during the Spanish–American War and Winn was later awarded the Silver Star for his actions at El Caney on 1 July 1898.

After a few months back in the United States, his regiment sailed for the Philippines in February 1899. He was later awarded a second Silver Star for his actions on Luzon at Angeles on 16 August 1899. Winn remained in the Philippines until September 1901. Returning to California, he participated in the relief efforts after the 1906 San Francisco earthquake and fires.

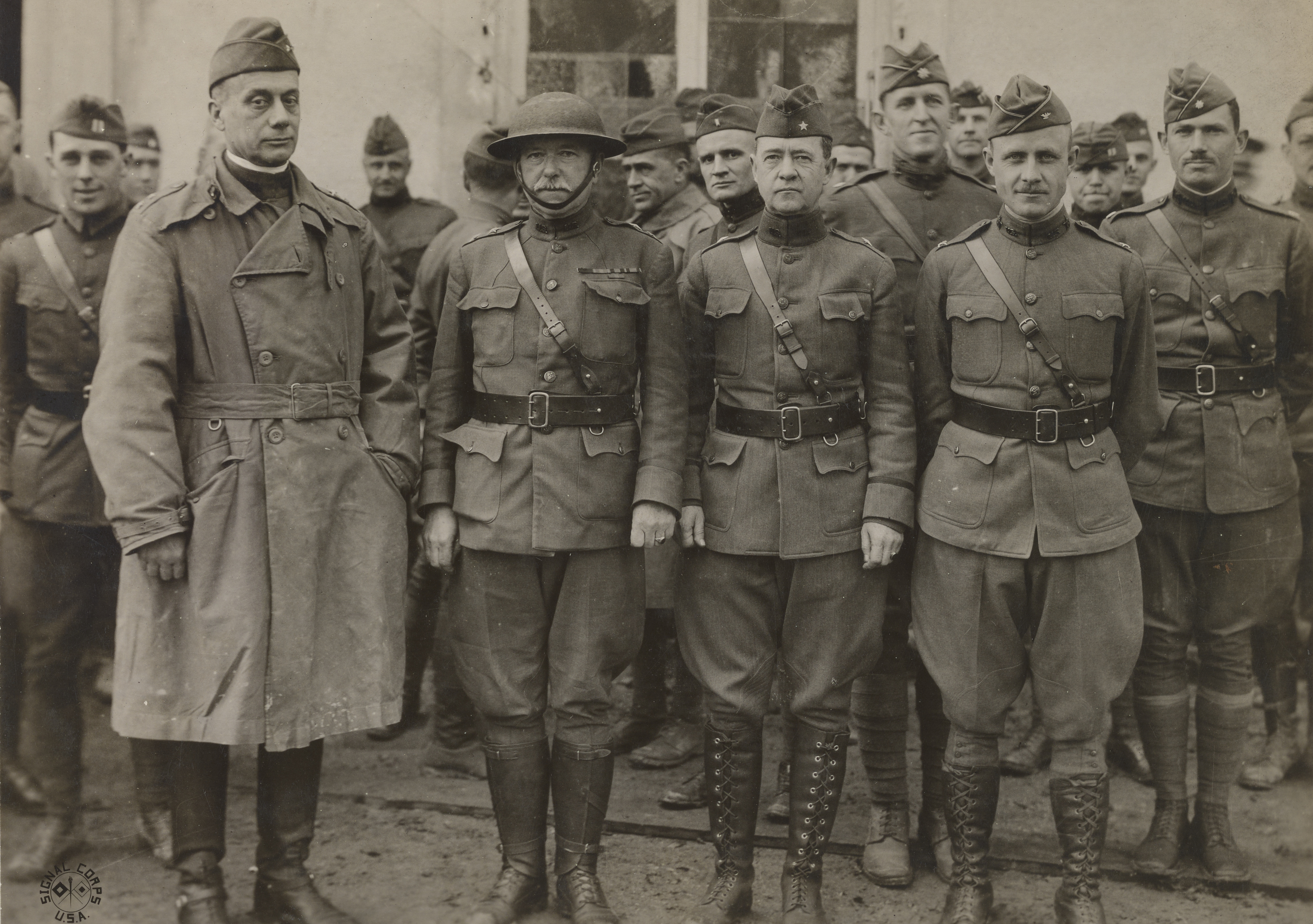
Major General William M. Wright (front row, extreme left) leaving the 89th Division to be succeeded by Major General Frank L. Winn (to Wright's left, wearing a brodie helmet) at Stenay, Meuse, France, November 12, 1918.

On 5 June 1909, Winn was promoted to major and assigned to the 13th Infantry until February 1915. He returned to the Philippines from May 1912 to September 1914. On 7 February 1915, Winn was promoted to lieutenant colonel and assigned to the 16th Infantry until June 1916. He participated in the Mexican Punitive Expedition from May 1916 to February 1917. On 1 July 1916, Winn was promoted to colonel and given command of the 24th Infantry Regiment in Mexico and New Mexico until July 1917, three months after the American entry into World War I.

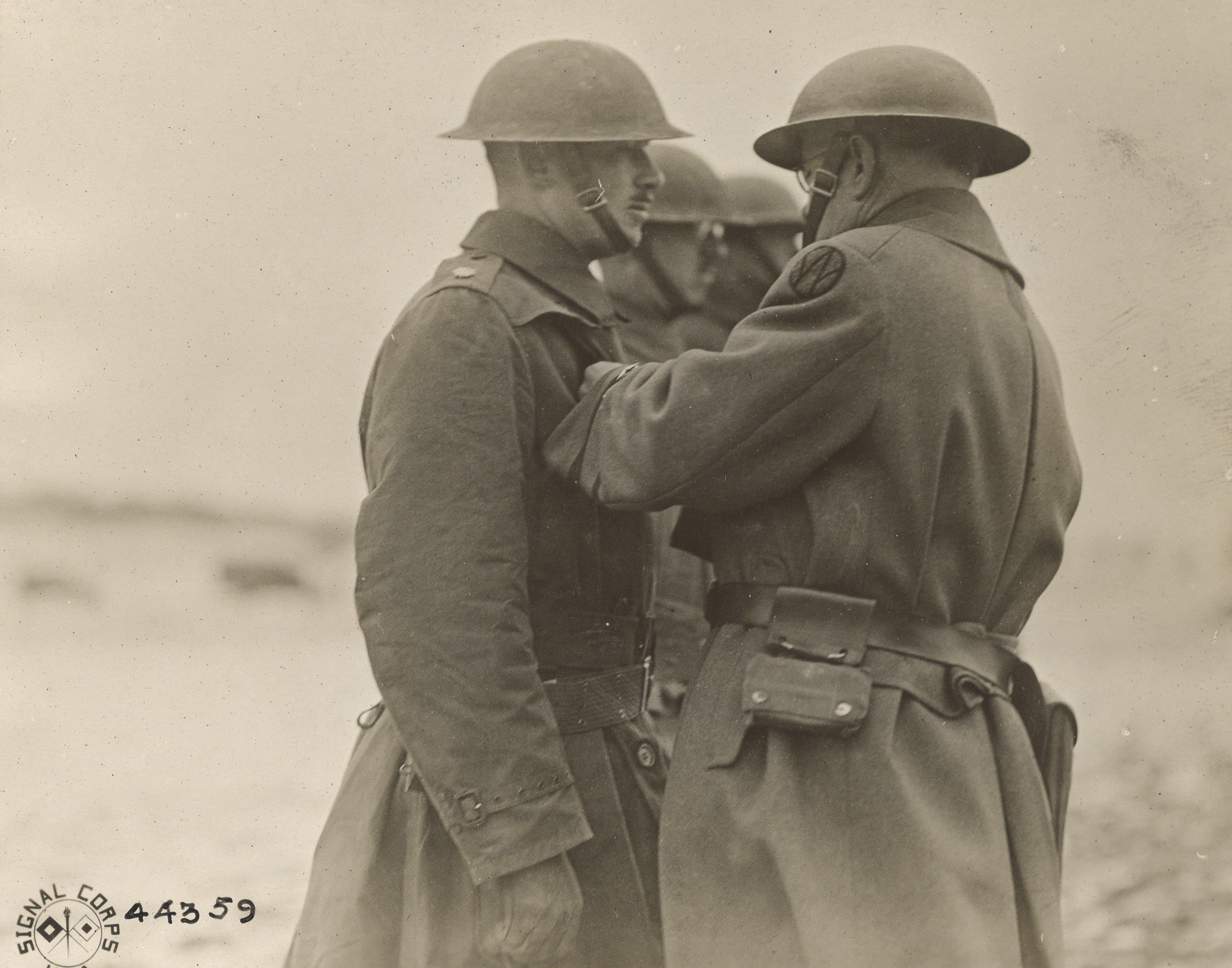
Lieutenant Colonel Brehon B. Somervell being decorated with the DSC by Major General Frank L. Winn at Nattenheim, Germany, December 1918.

On 27 August 1917, Winn accepted a temporary promotion to the rank of brigadier general and assumed command of the 177th Infantry Brigade, part of the 89th Division, commanded by Major General Leonard Wood, at Camp Funston in Kansas. He also spent a significant amount of his time from November 1917 to September 1918 serving as acting commander of the 89th Division in Wood's absence.

After his troops completed their training, they arrived in France in June 1918, becoming part of the American Expeditionary Forces (AEF). In September of that year, Major General William M. Wright assumed command of the 89th Division, with Winn, in temporary command, reverting to commanding the 177th Brigade, leading it in the Battle of Saint-Mihiel in mid-September and in the Meuse–Argonne offensive which followed soon after. Winn's troops were engaged in combat until the Armistice with Germany. On 14 October 1918, Winn accepted a temporary promotion to major general and assumed command of the 89th Division on the day after the Armistice, November 12, after Wright was promoted to command I Corps.

He returned to the United States with the division in May 1919 where it was demobilized in June. Winn was awarded the Army Distinguished Service Medal for his World War I service. The citation for the medal reads:

The President of the United States of America, authorized by Act of Congress, July 9, 1918, takes pleasure in presenting the Army Distinguished Service Medal to Major General Frank Long Winn, United States Army, for exceptionally meritorious and distinguished services to the Government of the United States, in a duty of great responsibility during World War I. As Commander of the 177th Infantry Brigade and later of the 89th Division, General Winn displayed military attainments of a high order and achieved signal successes. In the St. Mihiel and Meuse-Argonne offensive he accompanied the assaulting battalions and placed them on their objectives, inspiring all by his personal courage and gaining their confidence by his exceptional tactical skill and ability as a leader. At all times he was tireless in energy, showing keen judgment and initiative in handling difficult situations.

On 31 July 1919, Winn reverted to his permanent rank of colonel. He was given command of the 37th Infantry Regiment, holding this position from September 1919 to August 1920. On 10 October 1921, Winn accepted a promotion to brigadier general. He commanded the 4th Coast Artillery District from January to December 1922 and also the 8th Infantry Brigade from October to November 1922. On 4 December 1922, Winn accepted a promotion to major general and retired from active duty on the following day.

== Family and later life ==
Winn married Dora Boardman (29 October 1867 – 23 December 1891) on 5 November 1890, in San Francisco. She died six days after the birth of their only child, a daughter. Winn later remarried with Katharine McCord (8 June 1872 – 2 March 1969) on 15 October 1910, in Milwaukee.

After retirement, Winn and his second wife settled in San Francisco. After a few years, they moved first to Saratoga, California and then to Palo Alto, California. After his death in Palo Alto, he was buried at Arlington National Cemetery on 9 April 1941.

Winn was the first cousin of John S. Winn (1863–1940), a career soldier who also attained the rank of brigadier general; Frank's father William (1819–1898) and John's father Joshua Nicholas (1821–1901) were brothers, and Frank and John were both grandsons of Phillip Bird Winn (1786–1870) and Martha Fry (Nicholas) Winn (1794–1868).

== Bibliography ==
- Davis, Henry Blaine Jr. (1998). Generals in Khaki. Raleigh, North Carolina: Pentland Press. ISBN 1571970886. OCLC 40298151.

Military offices
Preceded by Leonard Wood	Commanding General 89th Division; June–September 1918	Succeeded by William M. Wright
Preceded by William M. Wright	Commanding General 89th Division; 1918–1919	Succeeded by Post deactivated
