= Lucien Grant Berry =

United States Army general (1863

Lucien G. Berry
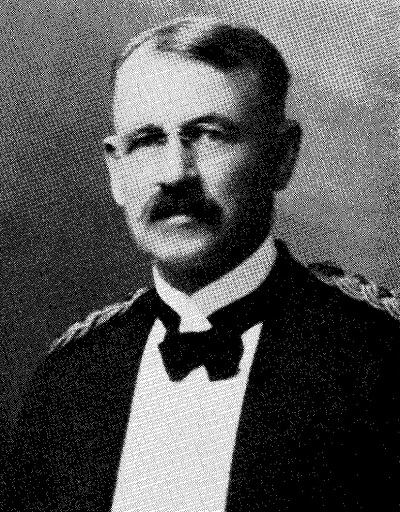
- Born: November 29, 1863; Caton, New York
- Died: December 31, 1937 (aged 74); Corning, New York
- Burial place: Arlington National Cemetery
- Education: United States Military Academy
- Spouse: Emily Ross Minier (m. 1886–1937)
- Military career
- Allegiance: United States
- Branch: United States Army
- Service years: 1886–1921
- Rank: Brigadier General
- Unit: Field Artillery Branch
- Commands: 6th Field Artillery Brigade; 78th Field Artillery Brigade; 60th Field Artillery Brigade; 4th Field Artillery Regiment; 2nd Battalion, 3rd Field Artillery Regiment; 1st Battalion, 3rd Field Artillery Regiment
- Conflicts: Spanish–American War; Philippine–American War; World War I

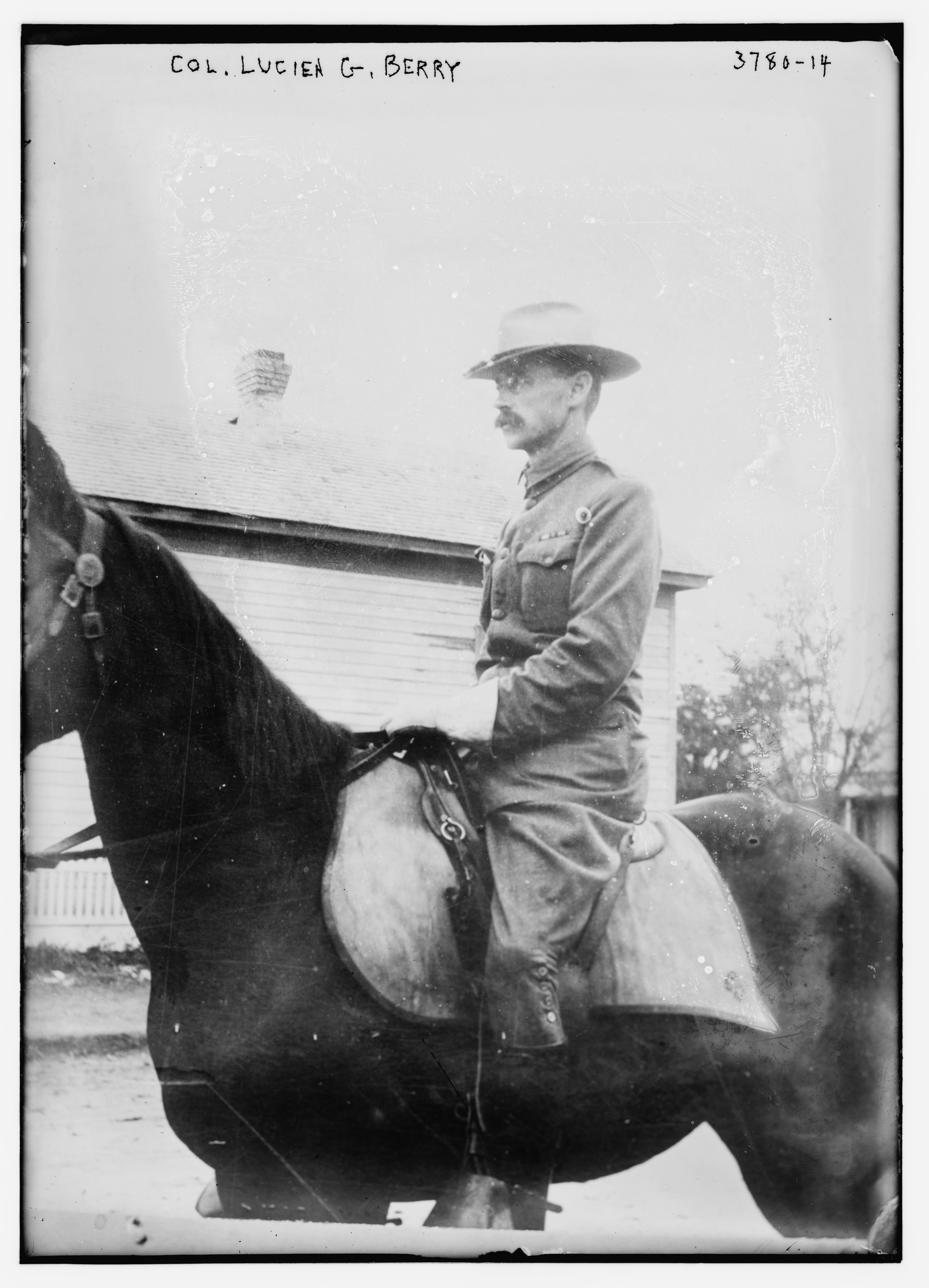
Lucien Grant Berry as a colonel in 1915

Lucien Grant Berry (November 29, 1863 – December 31, 1937) was a brigadier general in the United States Army who served in three wars.

== Early life ==
He was born on November 29, 1863, in Caton, New York, to Samuel Spicer Berry and Olive Elizabeth Reed.

He was appointed as a cadet at the United States Military Academy in West Point, New York, on July 1, 1882. Berry graduated number nine of seventy-seven in the class of 1886. Several of his classmates included men who would, like Berry himself, eventually rise to the rank of brigadier general or higher in their military careers. They included: Henry C. Newcomer, Mason Patrick, Thomas H. Rees, Frank McIntyre, John E. McMahon, Avery D. Andrews, Charles T. Menoher, Albert D. Kniskern, Charles C. Walcutt Jr., John J. Pershing, Peter E. Traub, Benjamin A. Poore, Jesse McI. Carter, Chauncey B. Baker, Malvern Hill Barnum, William H. Hay, James H. McRae, Walter H. Gordon, Arthur Johnson, Frank L. Winn, Charles C. Ballou, George B. Duncan, Lucius L. Durfee, Julius Penn and Edward M. Lewis.

== Personal life ==
He married Emily Ross Minier (1864–1945) on October 28, 1886. They had a son and five daughters.

== Military career ==
Berry was commissioned in the Fourth Artillery Brigade and served at Fort Preble, Maine; Fort Snelling, Minnesota, and Fort McPherson, Georgia. He graduated from the Artillery School at Fort Monroe, Virginia, and in 1892 he spent four years as an instructor at the United States Military Academy. He was in the Puerto Rican Expedition in 1898, then was sent to Fort Slocum, New York, and Fort Adams, Rhode Island.

In 1900, he was on the China Relief Expedition, became a captain, and was sent to the Philippines. Upon his return to the United States, Berry commanded the 21st Battery Field Artillery at Fort Sheridan, Illinois. He was then sent to the School of Fire at Fort Sill, Oklahoma, and in 1907 was promoted to major.

For three years, Berry commanded the 1st Battalion, 3rd Field Artillery at Fort Sam Houston, Texas. He then commanded the 2nd Battalion, 3rd Field Artillery at Fort Myer, Virginia for four months. On March 11, 1911, Berry was promoted to lieutenant colonel and went to the Army War College, graduating in 1912. He then served with the 4th Field Artillery Regiment at Fort D. A. Russell, Wyoming, until 1913, when he was promoted to colonel and given command of the regiment. He took his regiment to Veracruz, Mexico, in 1914 and then onto the Mexican Punitive Expedition in 1916 and 1917.

On August 5, 1917, Berry was promoted to brigadier general and commanded the 60th Field Artillery Brigade in Oklahoma. In May 1918, he took this brigade to France and joined the 35th Division in the Vosges Mountains. He was the 35th Division's Chief of Artillery and also supported the First Infantry Division in battle.

He returned to the States in April 1919, and on June 5 reverted to his permanent rank of colonel. He commanded the 78th Field Artillery Brigade and later the Sixth Field Artillery Brigade until his retirement on June 19, 1921. While retired, he was promoted to brigadier general in 1930.

== Death and legacy ==
He died at the age of seventy-four on December 31, 1937, in Corning, New York. He was buried at Arlington National Cemetery.
