= Paul Bernard Malone =

U.S. Army Major General

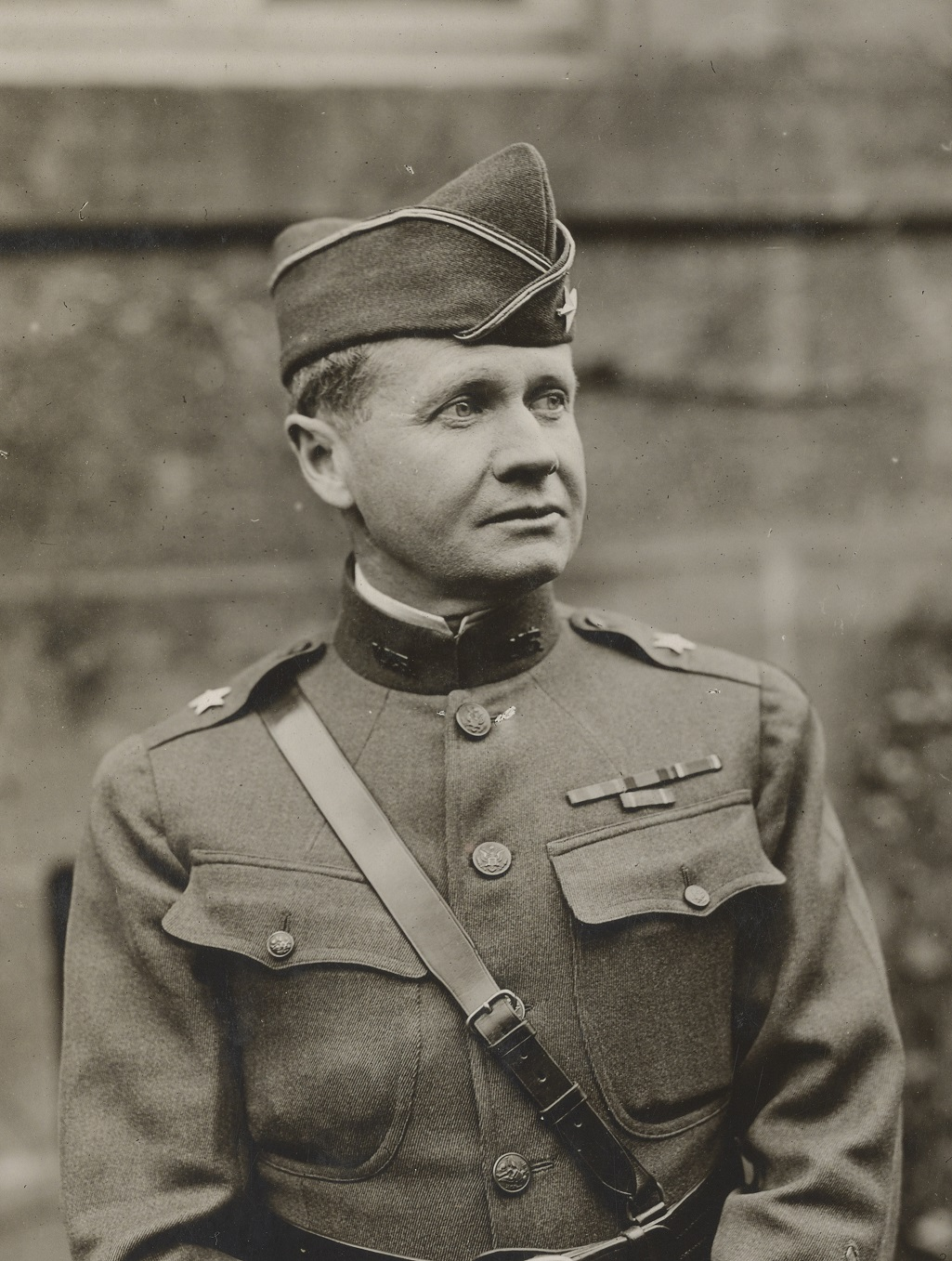
- Brigadier General Paul B. Malone, pictured here when he was commanding the 10th Brigade, 5th Division, Longuyon, France, November 1918.
- Born: May 8, 1872; Middletown, New York, United States
- Died: October 16, 1960 (aged 88); Sarasota, Florida, United States
- Burial place: Arlington National Cemetery, Virginia, United States
- Military career
- Allegiance: United States
- Branch: United States Army
- Service years: 1894–1936
- Rank: Major general
- Nickname: "Follow Me!"
- Service number: 0-442
- Unit: Infantry Branch
- Commands: Fourth Army; Ninth Corps Area; Third Corps Area; Sixth Corps Area; Philippine Division; 2nd Division; 10th Brigade; 23rd Regiment
- Conflicts: Spanish–American War: Battle of San Juan Hill; Philippine–American War; Pancho Villa Expedition; World War I: Battle of Belleau Wood; Battle of Château-Thierry; Battle of Soissons; Second Battle of the Marne; Battle of Saint-Mihiel; Meuse-Argonne Offensive
- Awards: Distinguished Service Cross; Army Distinguished Service Medal; Silver Star; Croix de Guerre; Legion of Honour
- Other work: writer

Paul Bernard Malone (May 8, 1872 – October 16, 1960) was a highly decorated officer in the United States Army with the rank of major general. Following his graduation from the United States Military Academy (USMA), he participated in the Spanish–American and Philippine–American Wars and commanded an infantry brigade in the last year of the World War I. Malone reached the rank of brigadier general during that conflict and distinguished himself during the Battle of Soissons.

He received the Distinguished Service Cross and the Distinguished Service Medal and several foreign decorations. Malone remained in the Army following the war and completed his service as commanding general, Fourth United States Army in 1936.

== Early years ==
Paul B. Malone was born in Middletown, New York on May 8, 1872, the son of Irish immigrants, John and Hannah Malone. His parents ran a dairy and young Paul received his early education at Saint James Parochial School and the De La Salle Institute. He received an appointment to the United States Military Academy at West Point, New York, on June 17, 1890, and graduated in 1894.

Among his classmates who also became general officers were Butler Ames, John W. Barker, Oliver Edwards, George H. Estes, Hamilton S. Hawkins III, Samuel Hof, Ora E. Hunt, Frank Parker, Briant H. Wells, and Clarence C. Williams.

He was commissioned second lieutenant in the Infantry branch on June 12, 1894, and was ordered to Fort Jay on Governors Island, New York, where he joined 13th Infantry Regiment. Malone was promoted to first lieutenant on April 26, 1898, and sailed with his regiment to Cuba in June that year. He distinguished himself during the Battle of San Juan Hill within Spanish–American War and received Silver Star citation for bravery.

With the outbreak of Philippine–American War, Malone was transferred to the newly established 27th Infantry Regiment in the Philippines in mid-1901 and took part in the chasing of rebel leader Emilio Aguinaldo to the swamps and morasses of the Luzon. He was ordered back to the United States, and following his promotion to captain on November 2, 1901, he was appointed an instructor of chemistry at the United States Military Academy at West Point, New York. While in this capacity, Malone taught a future General of the Army and Medal of Honor recipient, Douglas MacArthur.

Malone remained in this capacity for five years and sailed back to Cuba for occupation duty as a member of his old 27th Infantry Regiment in late 1906. He was later appointed a judge advocate and provost marshal general of the Army of Cuban Pacification and remained in that capacity for two years, before he was sent back to the United States.

Upon his return stateside, Malone attended the Army School of the Line at Fort Leavenworth, Kansas, and graduated with honors in May 1909. He then completed the Army Staff College in Washington, D.C., and was assigned to the War Department General Staff. While in this capacity, Malone and two other captains (John McAuley Palmer and George Van Horn Moseley) were ordered to Germany in September 1912 and observed German Imperial Army maneuvers northeast of Dresden.

In mid-1913, Malone was transferred to Honolulu, Hawaiian Islands and served with 2nd Infantry Regiment until June 1916. He was promoted to major on July 12, 1916, and appointed chief of staff, Eagle Pass District, Texas. Malone served in this capacity on the Mexican Border during the Pancho Villa Expedition until January 1917, when he was appointed Officer-in-charge of Training Camps in the Central Department. He also served for brief period at the Citizens' Military Training Camp, the first businessmen's training camp at Plattsburgh, New York, and also as chief instructor at the Presidio training camp.

== World War I ==
Following the American entry into World War I in April 1917, Malone was promoted to the temporary rank of lieutenant colonel on June 26, 1917, and embarked for France. He was attached to the General Headquarters, American Expeditionary Forces (AEF) under General John J. Pershing and assumed duty as Assistant Chief of Staff for Plans and Training (G-5) with the headquarters at Chaumont. Shortly thereafter, Malone was promoted to the temporary rank of colonel and ordered to the front in February 1918. While in this capacity, he was responsible for implementing the general staff training plan of all AEF forces.

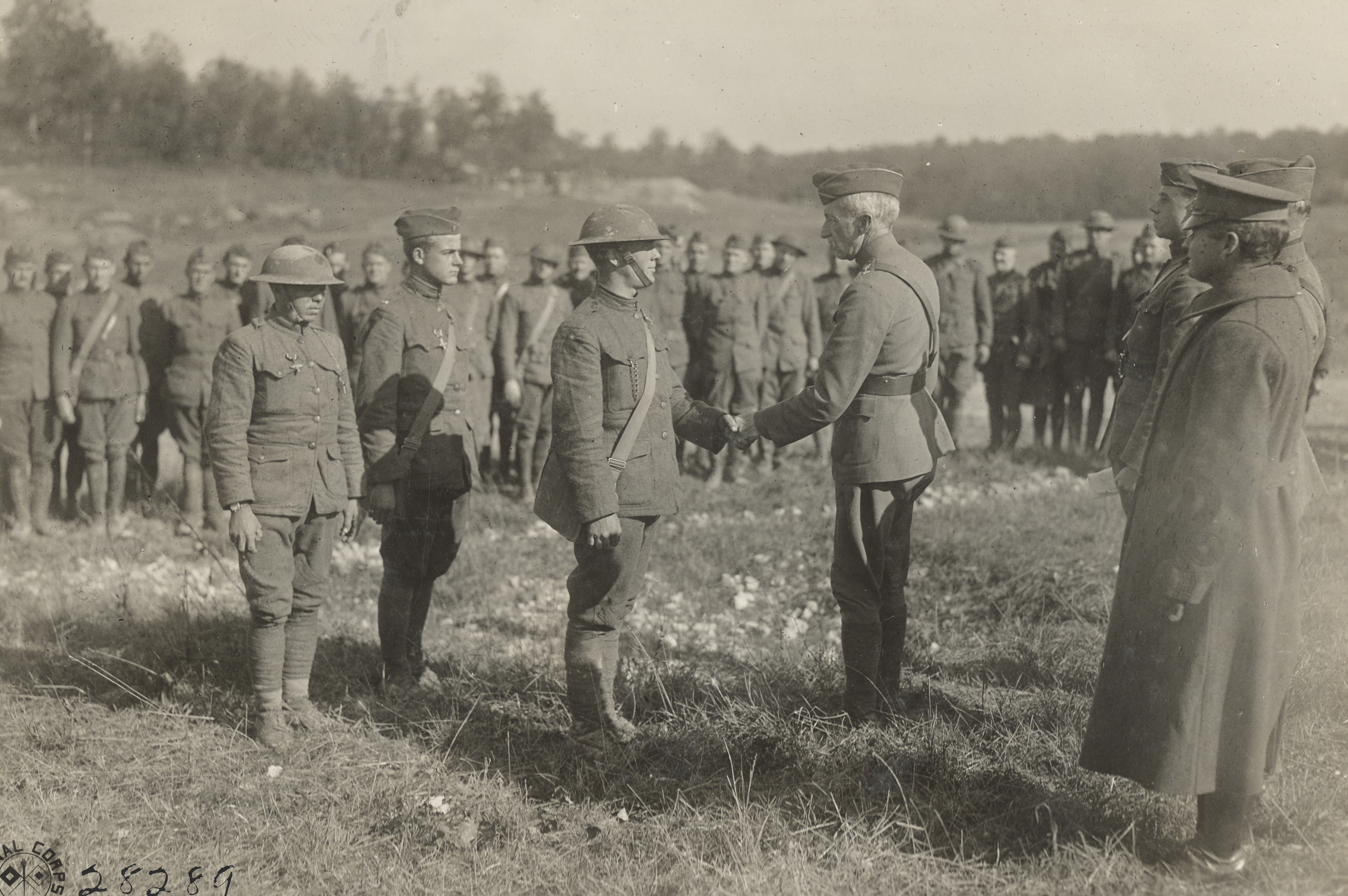
Major General John E. McMahon, commander of the 5th Division, shaking hands with Sergeant Lockhorn Huppman after pinning the Distinguished Service Cross on him, Forêt de Hesse, Meuse, France, October 10, 1918. Stood not far away from McMahon is Brigadier General Paul B. Malone, commanding the 10th Brigade of the division.

Transferring from staff duties to the command of troops, he assumed command of the 23rd Infantry Regiment, then part of the 3rd Brigade of the 2nd Infantry Division, then commanded by Major General Omar Bundy. After a period of training, Malone led his regiment to combat in the Sommedieue sector. During the Battle of Belleau Wood at the beginning of June, Malone and his regiment were originally placed in the reserve, but promptly received orders to plug the gap in the lines.

Malone then led the 23rd Infantry in the Battle of Soissons and particularly distinguished himself on July 19. During the two days which his regiment was engaged with the enemy, Malone frequently visited the advanced troops. On the evening of July 18, after the regiment had suffered severe losses, he assisted in the reorganization of a battalion for the attack on Vierzy. On the morning of July 19 he made a personal reconnaissance of the front lines, under heavy fire, in order to ascertain the enemy position, which was of vital importance. Malone then directed his regiment in attack and defeated the German forces. For his service during the Soissons operation, Malone was decorated with the Distinguished Service Cross (DSC), the second highest decoration of the United States Armed Forces.

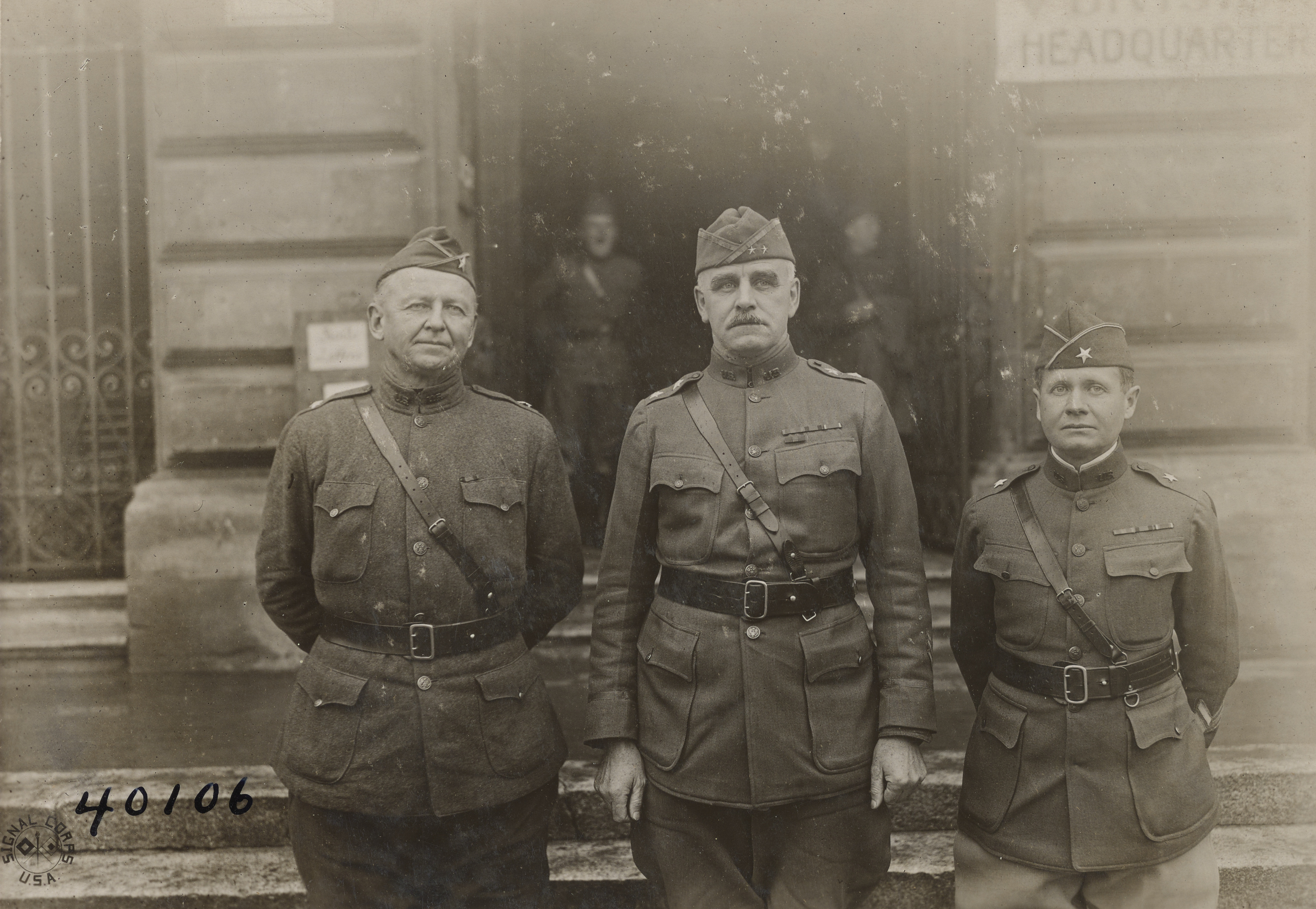
The Commanding General of the 5th Division and his two infantry brigade commanders at Longuyon, Meurthe-et-Moselle, France, November 24, 1918. From left to right: Brigadier General Joseph C. Castner, commanding the 9th Brigade, Major General Hanson E. Ely, commanding the 5th Division, and Brigadier General Paul B. Malone, commanding the 10th Brigade.

He continued to command his regiment until August when he was promoted and appointed commander of the 10th Brigade, part of the 5th Division under Major General John E. McMahon. Malone's first experience as a brigade commander arrived in mid-September in the Battle of Saint-Mihiel, where his brigade made its drive of nearly eight kilometers. He was promoted to the temporary rank of brigadier general on October 1, 1918.

The battle lasted only a few days but, for Malone and his brigade, there was little rest as it soon found itself engaged in the Meuse–Argonne offensive, where it gloriously captured the Bois des Rappes, forced the difficult crossing of the river Meuse, and rapidly cleared the eastern heights, taking the villages of Brieulles, Liny-devant-Dun, Fontaines, Vilosnes, Brandeville, Jametz, Remoiville and Louppy and penetrating eighteen kilometers beyond the Meuse before the Armistice with Germany caused hostilities to cease on November 11.

For his service as commander of the 10th Brigade, Malone received the Army Distinguished Service Medal and was cited in Orders of the Tenth French Corps and of the French Army of the North and Northeast as well as the Legion of Honour, rank Officer and the Croix de Guerre 1914–1918 with Palm by the Government of France.

== Later career ==
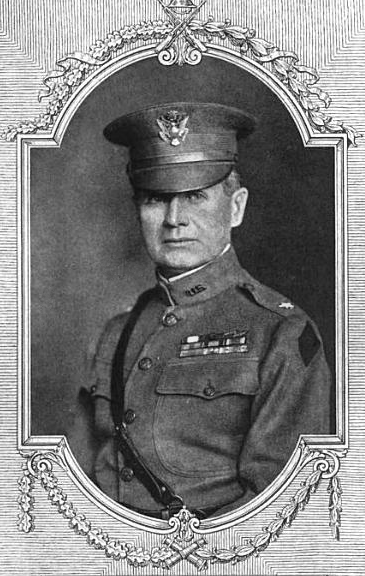
Malone following his return from France in 1919.

Upon his return to the United States, Malone reverted to the peacetime rank of lieutenant colonel and returned to the War Department General Staff. He was then sent to the newly born Army Infantry School at Fort Benning and served consecutively as assistant commandant under Generals Charles S. Farnsworth and Walter H. Gordon. During his tenure at the Army Infantry School, Malone reached the rank of colonel and is also credited with the design of School Crest "Follow Me!".

In April 1925, Malone was promoted again to the rank of brigadier general and ordered to Fort Sam Houston, Texas, where he assumed command of 2nd Infantry Division. While in this capacity, he supported American Legion War orphans’ fund, when first time in radio history broadcast conducted a talk from an airplane 3000 feet in the air. A fleet of three planes maneuvered over the city of San Antonio, directed by radio during the broadcasting.

He then briefly commanded the 12th Infantry Brigade at Fort Sheridan, Illinois, between March–June 1928, when he was promoted to major general and assumed command of Sixth Corps Area with headquarters in Chicago. Malone left United States in April 1929 and embarked for the Philippines, where he assumed command of Philippine Division at Fort William McKinley. While in this capacity, Malone served under Major General Douglas MacArthur, who commanded Philippine Department and Governor Henry L. Stimson.

Malone returned stateside in June 1931 and assumed duty as commanding general, Third Corps Area in Baltimore, Maryland. He was transferred to San Francisco in March 1935 and assumed command of Ninth Corps Area. During his tenure there, Malone's units participated in the California Pacific International Exposition.

In May 1935, he was given additional duty as commanding general, Fourth United States Army in San Francisco. The Fourth Army mission was to develop defense and operational plans for contingencies in the vicinity of the Pacific Coast and the western United States, review the mobilization plans of the Seventh and Ninth Corps Areas, and oversee the training of units in the army area. Malone served in that capacities until April 30, 1936, when he retired from active duty following a 42 years of service.

== Civil career ==
After his retirement from the Army, Malone settled in San Francisco, California, and accepted the position as administrator for the State Brewers’ Institute and was active in the American Legion, a war veterans' organization.

Following the United States entry into World War II, Malone's skills were requested again. Due to his military background, he was nominated to the capacity of defense coordinator of the Marin County, California, at the end of February 1942. However power struggle inside the Civil Defense office of Marin County did not allow his nomination and Malone was not appointed.

Malone then served as head of the statewide organization of the Madera County Minute Men of '42, which served to train and organize a force of hunters and others who are owners of firearms and ammunition suitable for armed resistance in case of invasion or sabotage. Statewide plans specify that the organization must be on a military basis, with in charge of each unit, and must be drilled and trained in simple military drills.

He later served on the State Guard committee with general Charles S. Farnsworth and proposed an increase in the guards' strength. He also broadcast a tribute as an encouragement to his former pupil, General Douglas MacArthur, who was struggling in the combat against the Japanese in the Philippines in January 1942. Malone also gained reputation as prominent military analyst and regularly attended the Marin junior chamber of commerce's meetings as guest speaker.

== Death ==
Malone retired to Sarasota, Florida, following World War II and died there on October 16, 1960, at the age of 88. He was buried with full military honors at Arlington National Cemetery, Virginia, together with his wife, Gertrude Kerwin (1872–1954). They had together four children: two daughters, Gertrude and Mildred and two sons, Paul Jr. and Andrew, both United States Military Academy alumni and Army Colonels.

== Writing career ==
He wrote novels about the United States Military Academy at West Point.

== His works ==
- Winning His Way to West Point. Philadelphia: Penn Pub. Co. 1904. OCLC 3889276.
- A Plebe at West Point. Philadelphia: Penn Pub. Co. 1905. OCLC 6436062.
- A West Point Yearling. Philadelphia: Penn Pub. Co. 1907. OCLC 6436083.
- A West Point Cadet. Philadelphia: Penn Pub. Co. 1908. OCLC 6436073.
- A West Point Lieutenant. Philadelphia: Penn Pub. Co. 1916. OCLC 29816025.
- Barbed Wire Entanglements. Harrisburg, Pa: Stackpole Sons. 1940. OCLC 2844107.

== Decorations ==
Here is Major general Malone's ribbon bar:

1st Row	Distinguished Service Cross		Army Distinguished Service Medal	
2nd Row	Silver Star	Spanish Campaign Medal	Philippine Campaign Medal	Army Cuban Pacification Medal
3rd Row	Mexican Border Service Medal	World War I Victory Medal with five Battle Clasps	Legion of Honour, rank Officer	French Croix de guerre 1914–1918 with Palm

== Legacy ==
In the late 1970s, a series of several weapons qualification ranges, at the United States Army Infantry Center at Fort Benning, Georgia, were named after him.

== See also ==
- List of foreign recipients of the Légion d'Honneur

Military offices
Preceded by Malin Craig	Commanding General, Fourth United States Army; May 21, 1935 – April 30, 1936	Succeeded by George S. Simonds
Preceded by Otho B. Rosenbaum	Commanding General, Ninth Corps Area; March 9, 1935 – April 30, 1936	Succeeded by Casper H. Conrad Jr.
Preceded by Fred W. Sladen	Commanding General, Third Corps Area; August 3, 1931 – February 18, 1935	Succeeded by Robert E. Callan
Preceded by Johnson Hagood	Commanding General, Philippine Division; June 22, 1929 – June 24, 1931	Succeeded by Casper H. Conrad Jr.
Preceded by Preston Brown	Commanding General, 2nd Infantry Division; April 7, 1925 – June 13, 1926	Succeeded by William D. Connor
