= Pearson Menoher =

American general (1892–1958)

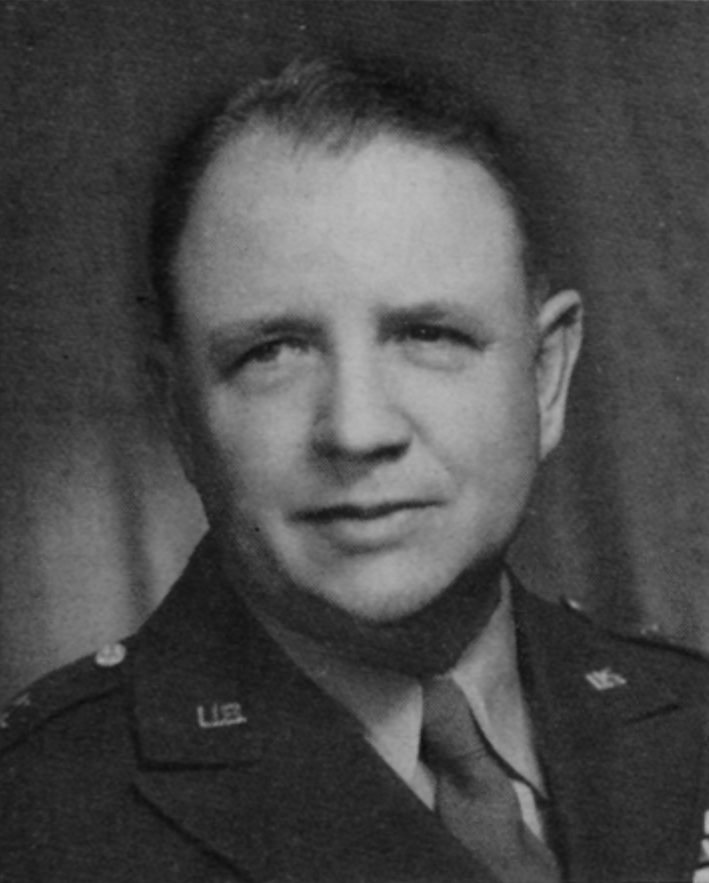
- Born: November 14, 1892; Hampton, Virginia, United States
- Died: February 13, 1958 (aged 65); Southern Pines, North Carolina, United States
- Alma mater: United States Military Academy (1915)
- Relatives: Charles T. Menoher (father)
- Military career
- Allegiance: United States
- Branch: United States Army
- Service years: 1915–1952
- Rank: Brigadier General
- Service number: 0-3805
- Unit: Cavalry Branch
- Commands: 24th Infantry Division
- Conflicts: World War I; World War II; Korean War; Battle of Taejon
- Awards: Army Distinguished Service Medal (2); Silver Star; Legion of Merit

Pearson Menoher (November 14, 1892 – February 13, 1958) was a career officer in the United States Army. A 1915 graduate of the United States Military Academy, he served from 1915 to 1952 and attained the rank of brigadier general. A veteran of World War I, World War II, and the Korean War, his awards included the Army Distinguished Service Medal, the Silver Star Medal and the Legion of Merit.

== Early life ==
He was born on 14 November 1892 in Fort Monroe, Hampton City, Virginia, US.

He was the son of Major General Charles T. Menoher.

He died on 13 February 1958.

He is buried in Arlington National Cemetery with the rest of his family.

== Start of career ==
He graduated from the United States Military Academy. He belonged to The class the stars fell on.

== Continued career ==
He served until 1952 and retired from service in 1952.

== Awards ==
He has received a number of awards, including but not limited to the Legion of Merit, Silver Star, and Army Distinguished Service Medal.

== Effective dates of promotion ==
Menoher's effective dates of promotion were:

- Second Lieutenant, June 12, 1915
- First Lieutenant, July 1, 1916
- Captain, June 22, 1917
- Major (temporary), July 30, 1918
- Captain, March 15, 1920 (reduced from temporary major)
- Major, July 1, 1920
- Captain, November 4, 1922 (reduced from major)
- Major, June 19, 1924
- Lieutenant Colonel, June 26, 1936
- Colonel (temporary), June 26, 1941
- Colonel, September 1, 1943
- Brigadier General (temporary), February 13, 1945
- Brigadier General, January 24, 1948
- Brigadier General (retired), May 31, 1952
