= California Debris Commission =

The California Debris Commission was a federal commission created in 1893 by an act of Congress to regulate California streams that had been devastated by the sediment washed into them from gold mining operations upstream in the Sierra Nevada. It was created to mitigate the damage to natural seasonal river flow and navigation, which had been caused by the extensive use of hydraulic mining. The act was codified under Navigation in 33 U.S.C. Chapter 14 (§§ 661-683). Given substantial power by Congress, the commission significantly reduced the stream damage caused.

The United States Army Corps of Engineers (USACE) had conducted similar works for the government since the beginning of the internal improvements program and it was considered the most knowledgeable organization. However, work involving California streams was outside its assigned responsibilities under the Rivers and Harbors Act. A commission was established to support the stream protection work instead of the normal Congressional House Committee on Rivers and Harbors. The commission consisted of three officers of the Corps of Engineers, appointed by the President, by and with the advice and consent of the Senate. As with the other works, they operated under the supervision of the Chief of Engineers and under the direction of the Secretary of War, who was later replaced by the Secretary of the Army.

Hydraulic mining causes large-scale erosion where employed to move unconsolidated sediments for mineral processing; it also causes similar large-scale sedimentation in downstream areas with a decreased stream gradient. The tons of sediment moved in this man-made and natural process resulted in raising the riverbeds along the Yuba, Sacramento, and some other rivers. This in turn increased the threat of floods in areas along the rivers, including such towns as Marysville on the Yuba. Over time this sediment would eventually move downstream to other river confluences and San Francisco Bay, disrupting navigation in those channels.

Congress created the California Debris Commission to address the man-made damage and mitigate its effects. Several methods were used to solve the adverse effects. The commission dredged the sediment from the rivers and deposited it on available land nearby; in some areas they constructed larger basins to contain the debris, along the Yuba River and other rivers, the mountains of sediment were piled along its banks, effectively making levees from the debris to protect against future flooding.

Among the members of the commission were Douglas MacArthur in the early 1900s. Thomas H. Rees was the commission's senior member from 1911 to 1917. Ulysses S. Grant III served on the commission in the early 1920s.

The Water Resources Development Act of 1986 eliminated the commission, with its work now the responsibility of the Corps' South Pacific Division.

== See also ==
- Clean Water Act
- List of navigation authorities in the United States
