= L. V. H. Durfee =

American soldier, professor, and baseball coach

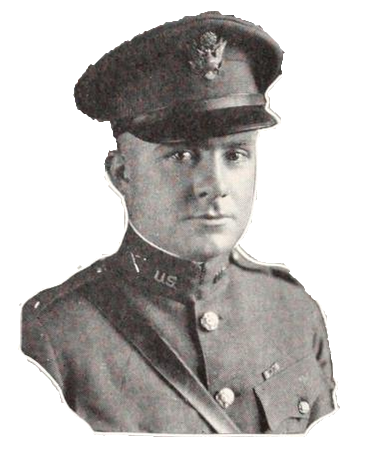

Biographical details
- Born: December 23, 1895
- Died: September 20, 1974 (aged 78); Alexandria, Virginia, U.S.
- Education: United States Military Academy

Playing career
- Army

Coaching career (HC unless noted)
- 1922–1924: Clemson

Loyd Van Horne "Red" Durfee (December 23, 1895 – September 20, 1974) was an American soldier, professor, and baseball coach. The son of General Lucius Loyd Durfee, Durfee attended the United States Military Academy, where he played baseball and hockey, and graduated in 1917. He served in the United States Army in France during World War I. Upon his return from the war, he was a Reserve Officer Training Corps instructor at Clemson College, and also served as the school's baseball coach from 1922 to 1924. Durfee was later a Spanish language professor at West Point until 1948.

== Coaching record ==
Record table
Season	Team	Overall	Postseason
Clemson Tigers (Independent) (1922–1924)
1922	Clemson	10–8	
1923	Clemson	13–8–1	
1924	Clemson	6–10	
Total:		29–26–1	
