= Ninth Corps Area =

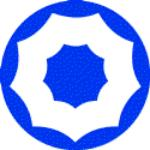
- Active: 20 August 1920–7 December 1941
- Country: United States of America
- Branch: United States Army
- Type: Military District
- Role: Training
- Part of: Department of War
- Garrison/HQ: Presidio of San Francisco, CA

The Ninth Corps Area was a Corps area of the United States Army from 20 August 1920 to 7 December 1941. It was formed at Cavalry Barracks, the Presidio of San Francisco from the discontinued Western Department. The Ninth Corps Area included the states of Washington, Oregon, Idaho, Montana, Wyoming, Utah, and Nevada.

Its formations included Fourth Army, IX Corps (3d Division, 40th Division, 41st Division), XIX Corps (91st Division, 96th Division, 104th Division), Ninth Coast Artillery District, 1st Wing (a formation which may have become the 1st Bombardment Wing), and Ninth Corps Area Service Command.

The Ninth Corps Area Training Center was established in 1921, at the Presidio of San Francisco to train regular army and organized reserve units, as well as ROTC cadets and Citizens' Military Training Camp candidates.

The Ninth Corps Area was redesignated as the Ninth Corps Area Service Command (CASC) in May 1941 and redesignated again as Ninth Service Command 22 July 1942.

In the 1947 reorganization, Headquarters, Ninth Service Command remained at Salt Lake City, Utah, as an area command under the Commanding General, Sixth Army at the Presidio of San Francisco. Its "functions and duties [were to be] prescribed by him."

== Commanders ==
Ninth Corps Area

- Major General Hunter Liggett 1 September 1920–21 March 1921
- Brigadier General Richard M. Blatchford 21 March 1921–June 1921
- Major General Charles H. Muir June 1921–July 1921
- Major General William M. Wright July 1921–29 January 1922
- Major General Charles G. Morton 30 January 1922–15 January 1925
- Major General William H. Johnson 15 January 1925–13 February 1925
- Major General Charles T. Menoher 13 February 1925–23 March 1926
- Brigadier General Henry D. Todd 23 March 1926–15 June 1926
- Major General James H. McRae 16 June 1926–31 December 1926
- Major General John L. Hines 31 December 1926–10 September 1930
- Brigadier General Frank M. Caldwell 10 September 1930–2 October 1930
- Major General Douglas MacArthur 2 October 1930–20 November 1930
- Major General Malin Craig 21 November 1930–24 January 1935
- Brigadier General Otho B. Rosenbaum 1 February 1935–9 March 1935
- Major General Paul B. Malone 9 March 1935–30 April 1936
- Brigadier General Caspar H. Conrad Jr.1 May 1936–20 June 1936
- Major General George S. Simonds 20 June 1936–8 March 1938
- Major General Albert J. Bowley 8 March 1938–30 November 1939
- Lt. Gen. John L. DeWitt 5 December 1939–8 November 1940

Ninth Corps Area Service Command

- Major General Ernest D. Peek 8 November 1940–30 September 1941
- Major General Jay L. Benedict 3 November 1941–2 April 1942

Ninth Service Command

- Major General Kenyon A. Joyce (July 1942-11 October 1943)
- Major General David McCoach Jr. (October 1943-1 September 1944)
- Major General William E. Shedd Jr. (1 September 1944-22 May 1946)
