= Charles T. Menoher =

United States Army general (1862–1930)

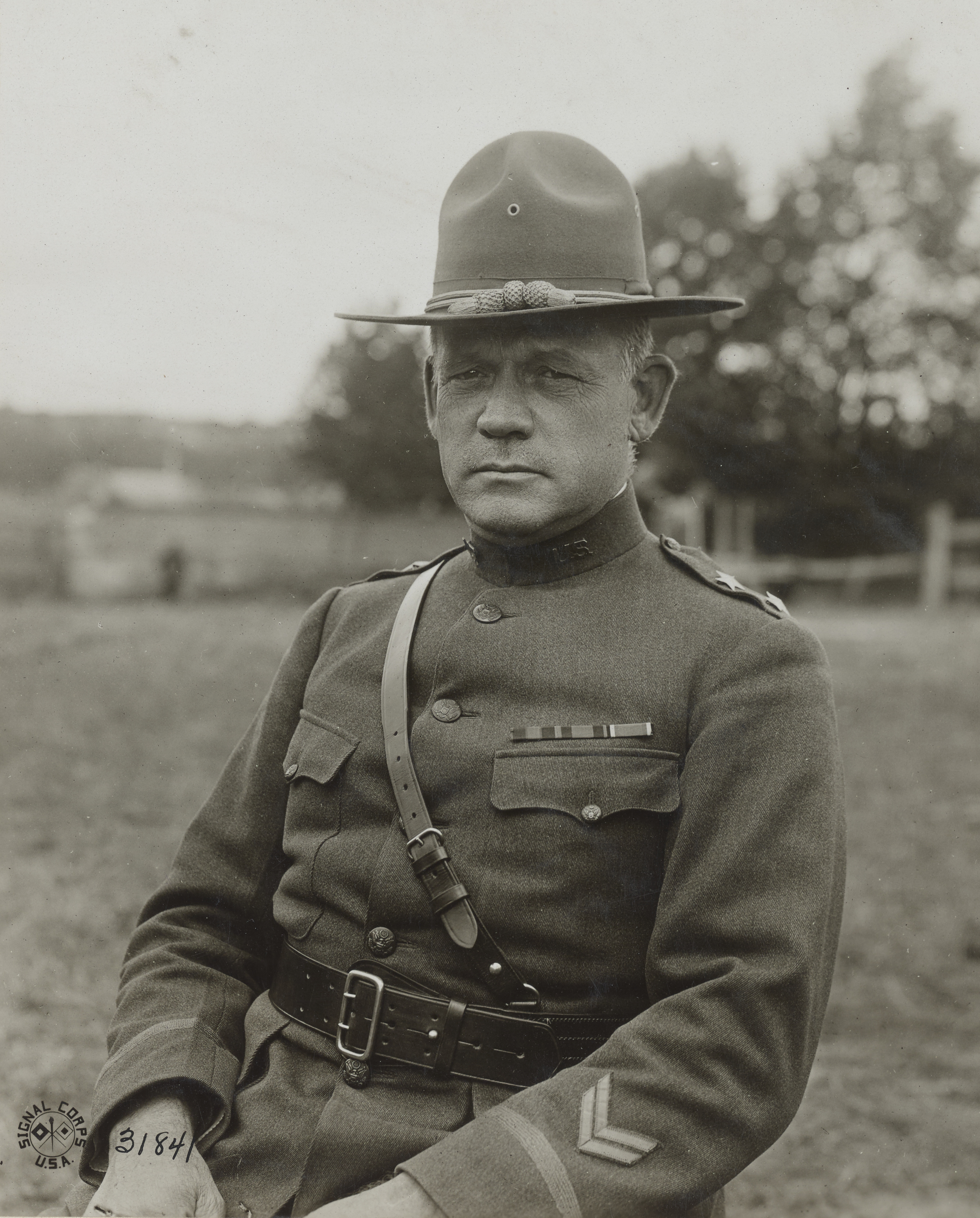
- Born: March 20, 1862; Johnstown, Pennsylvania, U.S.
- Died: August 11, 1930 (aged 68); Washington, D.C., U.S.
- Burial place: Arlington National Cemetery, Virginia, United States
- Military career
- Allegiance: United States
- Branch: United States Army
- Service years: 1886–1926
- Rank: Major General
- Service number: 0-34
- Commands: 42nd Division; VI Corps; US Army Air Service; Hawaiian Department; IX Corps
- Conflicts: Spanish–American War; World War I
- Awards: Army Distinguished Service Medal

Major General Charles Thomas Menoher (March 20, 1862 – August 11, 1930) was a U.S. Army general, first Chief of the United States Army Air Service from 1918 to 1921, and commanded the U.S. Army Hawaiian Department from 1924 to 1925.

== Early life ==
The son of an American Civil War veteran, Menoher was born in Johnstown, Pennsylvania in 1862 and graduated 16 in a class of 77 from the United States Military Academy at West Point, New York in 1886 with a commission as an artillery officer. Several of his classmates included men who would, like Menoher himself, eventually rise to general officer rank, such as John J. Pershing, William H. Hay, Walter Henry Gordon, Edward Mann Lewis, Mason Patrick, Julius Penn, Avery D. Andrews, John E. McMahon, Ernest Hinds, George B. Duncan, James McRae, Lucien Grant Berry and Jesse McI. Carter.

== Military career ==
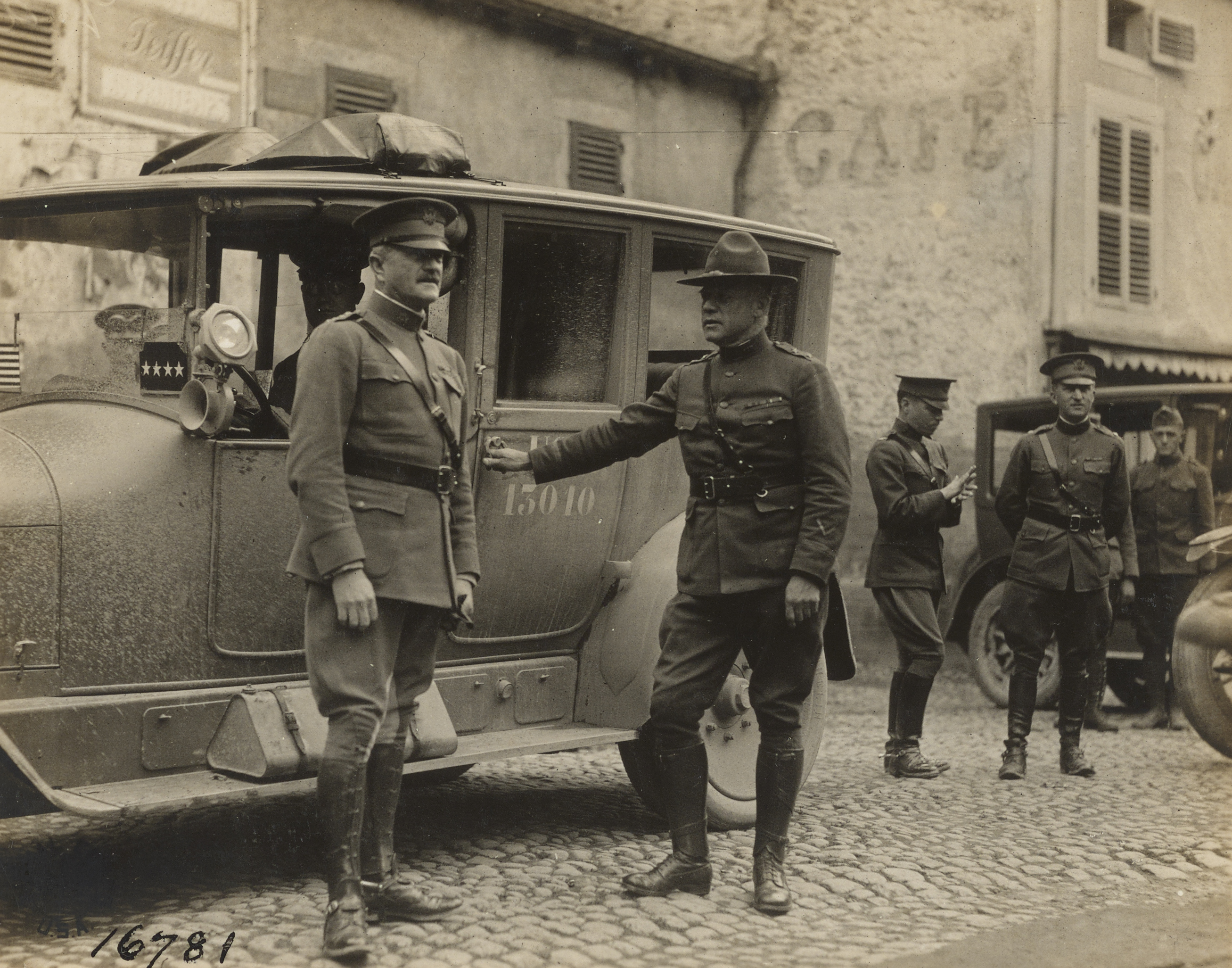
General John J. Pershing, C-in-C of the AEF, and Major General Menoher, commanding the 42nd Division, in front of the 42nd Division's headquarters, Chatel, France, June 1918.

Menoher served in Cuba and the Philippines during the Spanish–American War. He later graduated from the Army War College and was selected for the original General Staff Corps, where he served from 1903 to 1907. He was commander of the 5th Field Artillery Regiment from 1916 to 1917.

He was still in command of the regiment until late August 1917, almost five months after the American entry into World War I, when, earlier that month, he received a promotion to the temporary rank of brigadier general and was sent to France to take command of the American Expeditionary Forces's (AEF) School of Instruction, Field Artillery, located in Saumar.

Menoher held this post until mid-December when he was selected by General John J. Pershing, commander-in-chief (C-in-C) of the AEF and a West Point classmate, to succeed Major General William A. Mann as commanding general (CG) of the 42nd "Rainbow" Division. He would remain in command of the 42nd for the next 10 months, commanding the division throughout almost all of its period of combat service on the Western Front, participating in the Champagne-Marne offensive and in the successful Allied offensives of Saint Mihiel and Meuse-Argonne. In November, Menoher was succeeded in command of the 42nd by Brigadier General Douglas MacArthur, formerly the division's chief of staff but now commanding its 84th Infantry Brigade, in this position.

As the war was coming to an end, Menoher was placed in command of the VI Corps (United States). He later received the Army Distinguished Service Medal, along with foreign awards from France, Belgium, and Italy. The citation for his Army DSM reads:

The President of the United States of America, authorized by Act of Congress, July 9, 1918, takes pleasure in presenting the Army Distinguished Service Medal to Major General Charles Thomas Menoher, United States Army, for exceptionally meritorious and distinguished services to the Government of the United States, in a duty of great responsibility during World War I. In Command of the 42d Division from Chateau-Thierry to the conclusion of the Meuse-Argonne offensive, including the Baccarat sector, Reims, Vesles, and at St. Mihiel salient, General Menoher with his division participated in all of these important engagements. The reputation as a fighting unit of the 42d Division is in no small measure due to the soldierly qualities and the military leadership of General Menoher.

Following the end of the war, Menoher became first Director and then Chief of Air Service, where he began a famous (and ultimately losing) conflict with his Assistant Chief, Brigadier General Billy Mitchell. He was promoted to major general in March 1921. Requesting an assignment with troops, Menoher then took command of the Hawaiian Division in 1922 before taking over the entire Hawaiian Department. After this, he commanded the Ninth Corps Area in San Francisco until his mandatory retirement on March 20, 1926.

== Personal life ==
He married Nannie Pearson. They had four sons: Charles, Pearson, Darrow, and William. His three youngest sons all graduated from West Point, and served in the Army during World War II. Pearson (1892–1958), a classmate of both Dwight D. Eisenhower and Omar Bradley, reached the rank of major general during the Korean War, after seeing service in both of the world wars.

Menoher later married Elizabeth Painter.

== Death and legacy ==
Menoher died of pneumonia at the age of 68 on August 11, 1930. He was buried at Arlington National Cemetery, in Arlington, Virginia.

Menoher Boulevard, a major road in Johnstown, Pennsylvania, and Menoher Drive on Joint Base Andrews, Maryland, are named after him.

== Dates of rank ==
Insignia	Rank	Component	Date
None	Cadet	United States Military Academy	1 July 1882
None in 1886	Second lieutenant	Regular Army	1 July 1886
	First lieutenant	Regular Army	23 December 1892
	Captain	Regular Army	2 February 1901
	Major	Regular Army	25 January 1907
	Lieutenant colonel	Regular Army	26 May 1911
	Colonel	Regular Army	1 July 1916
	Brigadier general	National Army	5 August 1917
	Major general	National Army	28 November 1917 (Reverted to brigadier general on 15 February 1919.)
	Brigadier general	Regular Army	7 November 1918
	Major general	Temporary	3 July 1920
	Major general	Regular Army	8 March 1921
	Major general	Retired List	20 March 1926

== Bibliography ==
- Cooke, James J. (1997). Pershing and his Generals: Command and Staff in the AEF. Praeger Publishers. ISBN 0-275-95363-7.
- Cooke, James J, The Rainbow Division in the Great War, 1917-1919, Greenwood Publishing Group, Incorporated 1994 ISBN 0-275-94768-8
- Davis, Henry Blaine Jr. (1998). Generals in Khaki. Raleigh, North Carolina: Pentland Press. ISBN 1571970886. OCLC 40298151.

Military offices
Preceded by William A. Mann	Commanding General 42nd Division; 1917–1918	Succeeded by Charles D. Rhodes
Preceded by Charles C. Ballou	Commanding General VI Corps; November−December 1918	Succeeded by Charles H. Martin
Preceded by John D. Barrette	Commanding General Hawaiian Division; 1922−1924	Succeeded by Thomas H. Slavens
