= George B. Duncan =

United States Army general

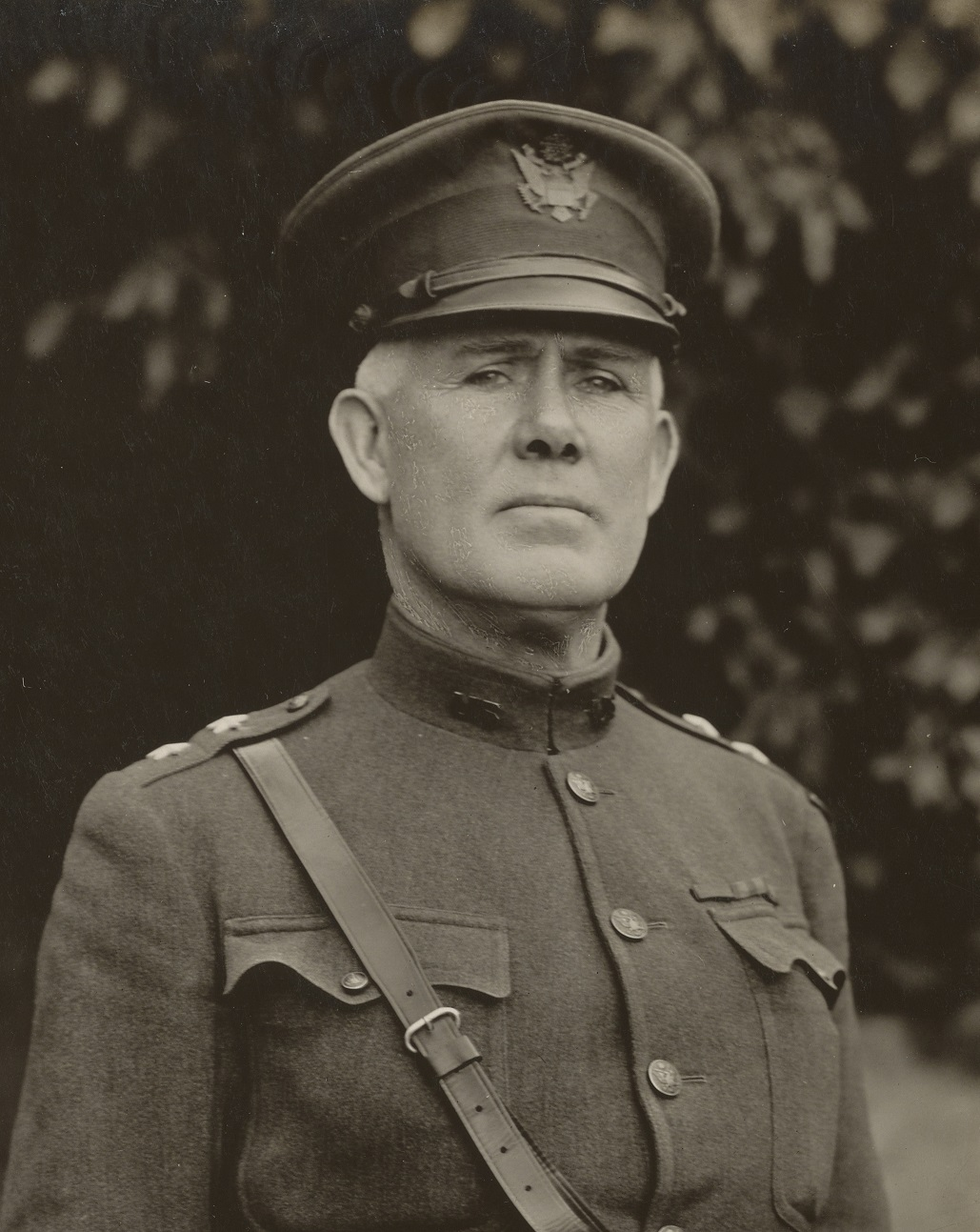
- George B. Duncan as a major general in Prauthoy, France, November 25, 1918.
- Born: October 10, 1861; Lexington, Kentucky, United States
- Died: March 15, 1950 (aged 88); Lexington, Kentucky, United States
- Burial place: Lexington Cemetery, Kentucky, United States
- Military career
- Allegiance: United States
- Branch: United States Army
- Service years: 1886–1925
- Rank: Major General
- Service number: 0-60
- Unit: Infantry Branch
- Commands: 1st Brigade; 77th Division; 82nd Division; Seventh Corps Area
- Conflicts: Spanish–American War; Philippine–American War; World War I
- Awards: Army Distinguished Service Medal; Croix de Guerre (France); Commander of the Legion of Honor (France); Companion of the Order of the Bath (United Kingdom)

Major General George Brand Duncan (October 10, 1861 – March 15, 1950) was a United States Army officer who served in numerous conflicts, most notably World War I, where he commanded the 82nd Division, now the 82nd Airborne Division.

== Military career ==
The son of Henry Timberlake Duncan Jr., mayor of Lexington, Kentucky, George Brand Duncan entered the United States Military Academy (USMA) in 1882, graduating 65 of 77 in June 1886 and receiving a position as a second lieutenant in the 9th Infantry. Several of his classmates included men who would, like Duncan himself, eventually rise to general officer rank, such as John J. Pershing, Charles T. Menoher, Walter Henry Gordon, Edward Mann Lewis, Mason Patrick, Julius Penn, Avery D. Andrews, John E. McMahon, Ernest Hinds, William H. Hay, James McRae, Lucien Grant Berry and Jesse McI. Carter.

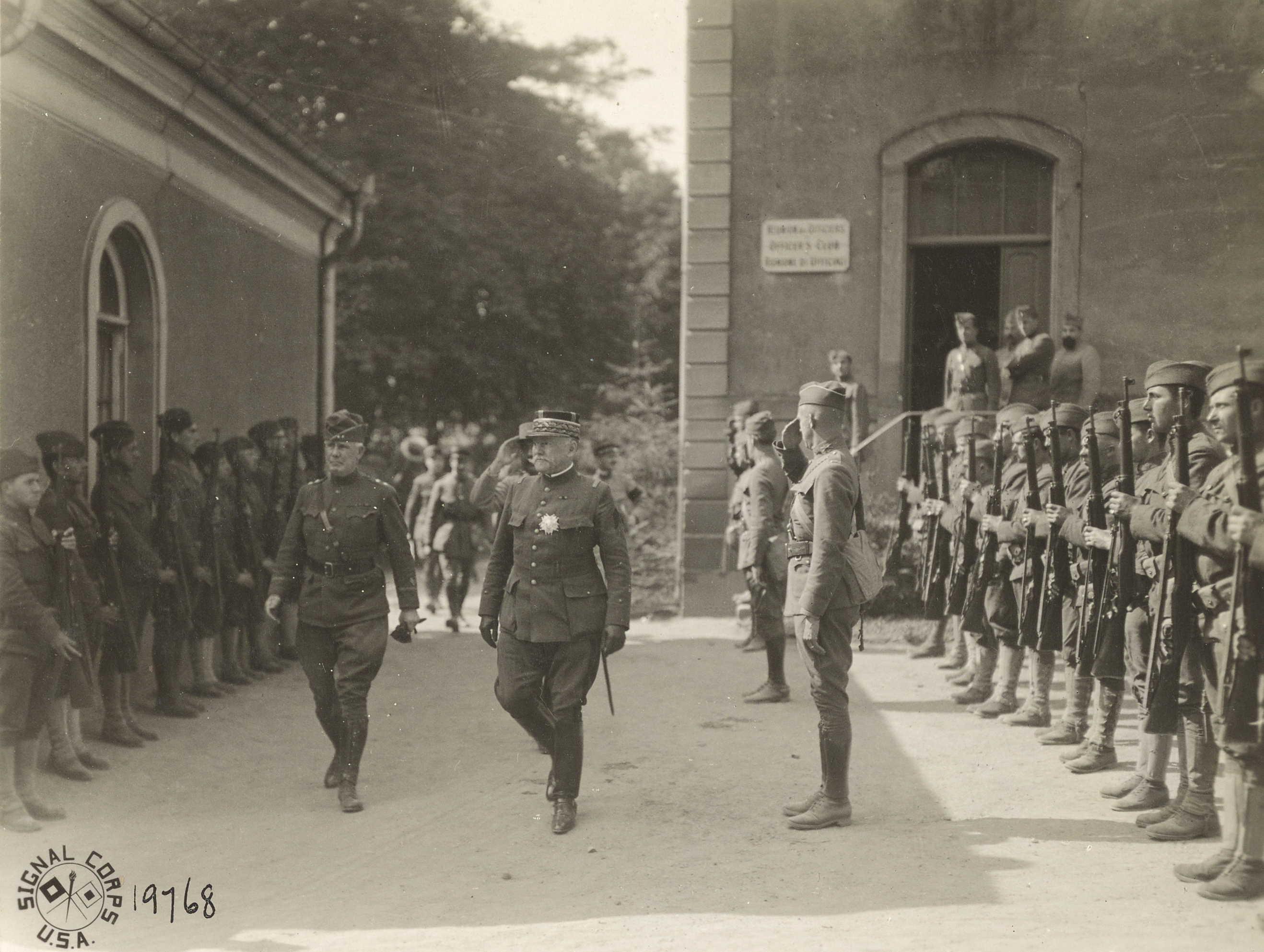
French General Augustin Gérard, commanding the French Eighth Army, accompanied by Major General George B. Duncan, commanding the 77th Division, leaving the 77th's headquarters and passing by its Guard of Honor, Baccarat, France, June 1918.

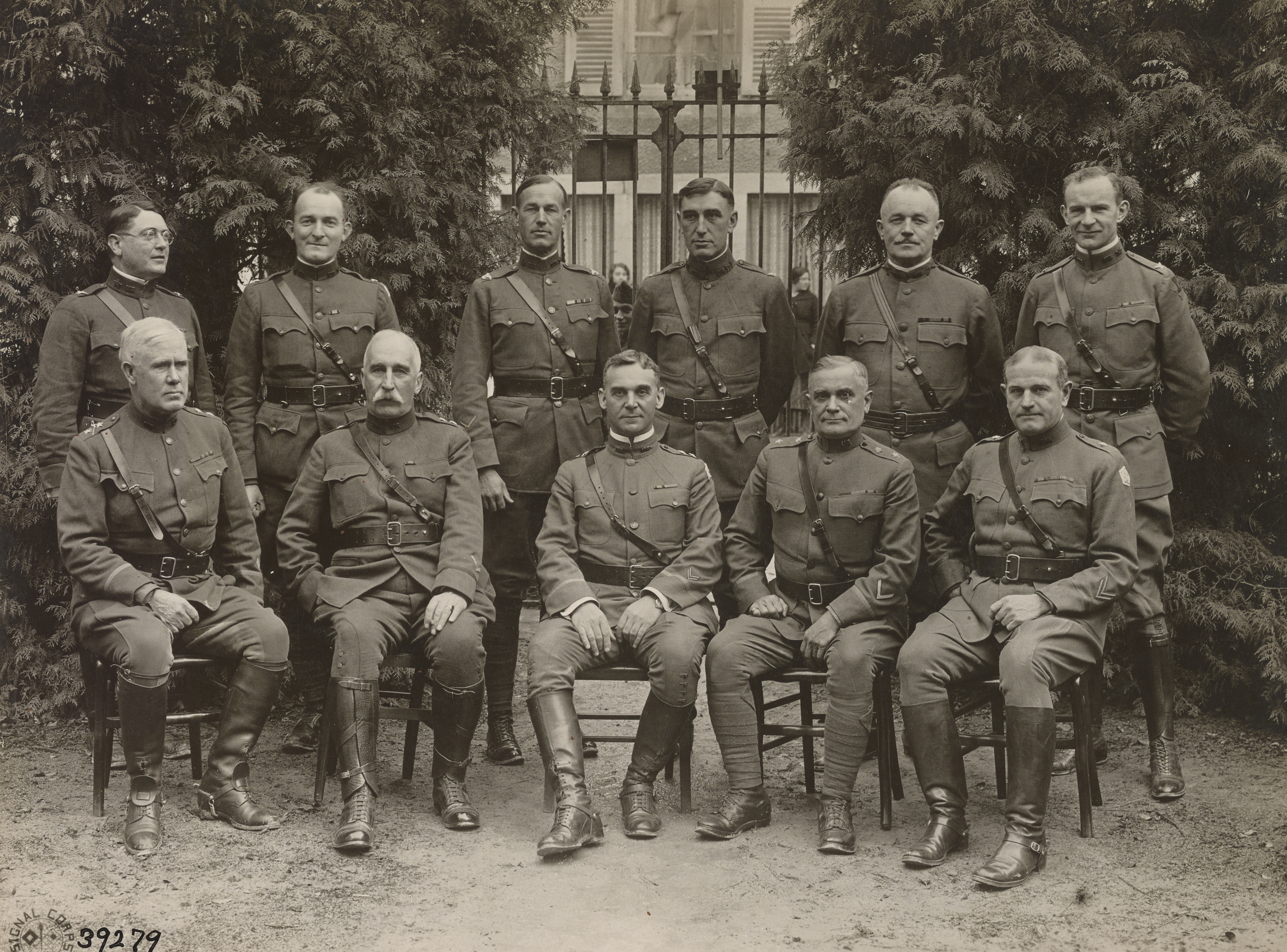
Major General Charles Pelot Summerall, sat in the middle, along with members of his staff and senior commanders in his V Corps, pictured here in 1918 or 1919. Major General George B. Duncan, commanding the 82nd Division, is sat on the far left.

He was stationed in Cuba during the Spanish–American War, and he served with distinction during the Philippine–American War, helping to organize the Philippine Scouts.

After a term on the General Staff, Duncan reported to France in June 1917, two months after the American entry into World War I, where he served as the commander of the 26th Infantry Regiment, part of the 1st Division of the American Expeditionary Forces (AEF). In September he was given command of the 1st Brigade, 1st Division.

He remained in this appointment until May 1918 when he was selected by General John J. Pershing, his classmate at West Point who was now in command of the AEF, to take over the 77th Division. The first of the National Army divisions to arrive in France, the 77th began training with the British forces in northern France and Belgium where it soon gained a reputation as a first-class unit.

After having been relieved over concerns about his physical condition, Duncan successfully convinced Pershing to return him to command. In October 1918, Duncan relieved Major General William P. Burnham as commander of the 82nd Division, and participated in the Meuse-Argonne Offensive.

As a result of his service in World War I, he received numerous decorations, including the Croix de Guerre with two palms and a star and status as a Commander in the Legion of Honor from France, status as a Companion of Order of the Bath from the United Kingdom, and the Army Distinguished Service Medal from the United States. The citation for his DSM reads:

The President of the United States of America, authorized by Act of Congress, July 9, 1918, takes pleasure in presenting the Army Distinguished Service Medal to Major General George Brand Duncan, United States Army, for exceptionally meritorious and distinguished services to the Government of the United States, in a duty of great responsibility during World War I. Arriving in France with the first contingent of American troops, General Duncan commanded in turn a regiment, brigade, and division with conspicuous success. In the command of the 77th Division in the Baccarat sector his sound military judgment, energy, and resolution were important factors in the successes gained. Later, in command of the 82d Division in the Argonne-Meuse offensive, he proved himself a brilliant leader with great force and energy.

Duncan and fellow Major General Campbell King were the first two Americans ever honored with the Croix de Guerre. Duncan commanded the Seventh Corps Area from 1922 until 1925.

== Personal life ==
Duncan married Mary Kercheval on October 23, 1895. The couple had two sons: Daniel, born in 1901, and Henry, born in 1903. Daniel, however, died as a child in 1906.

Duncan retired from military service in 1925. He is buried in Section D, Lot 120 in the Lexington Cemetery in Lexington, Kentucky.

== Bibliography ==
- Cooke, James J. (1997). Pershing and his Generals: Command and Staff in the AEF. Praeger Publishers. ISBN 0-275-95363-7.
- Davis, Henry Blaine Jr. (1998). Generals in Khaki. Raleigh, North Carolina: Pentland Press. ISBN 1571970886. OCLC 40298151.
- Coffman, Edward M. (1998). The War to End All Wars: The American Military Experience in World War. University Press of Kentucky. ISBN 978-0-8131-0955-8.

Military offices
Preceded by Evan M. Johnson	Commanding General 77th Division; May–July 1918	Succeeded by Evan M. Johnson
Preceded by William P. Burnham	Commanding General 82nd Division; 1918–1919	Succeeded by Post deactivated
Preceded by Francis J. Kernan	Commanding General Seventh Corps Area; 1922–1925	Succeeded by Benjamin A. Poore
