= James McRae (United States Army officer) =

United States Army general

James Henry McRae
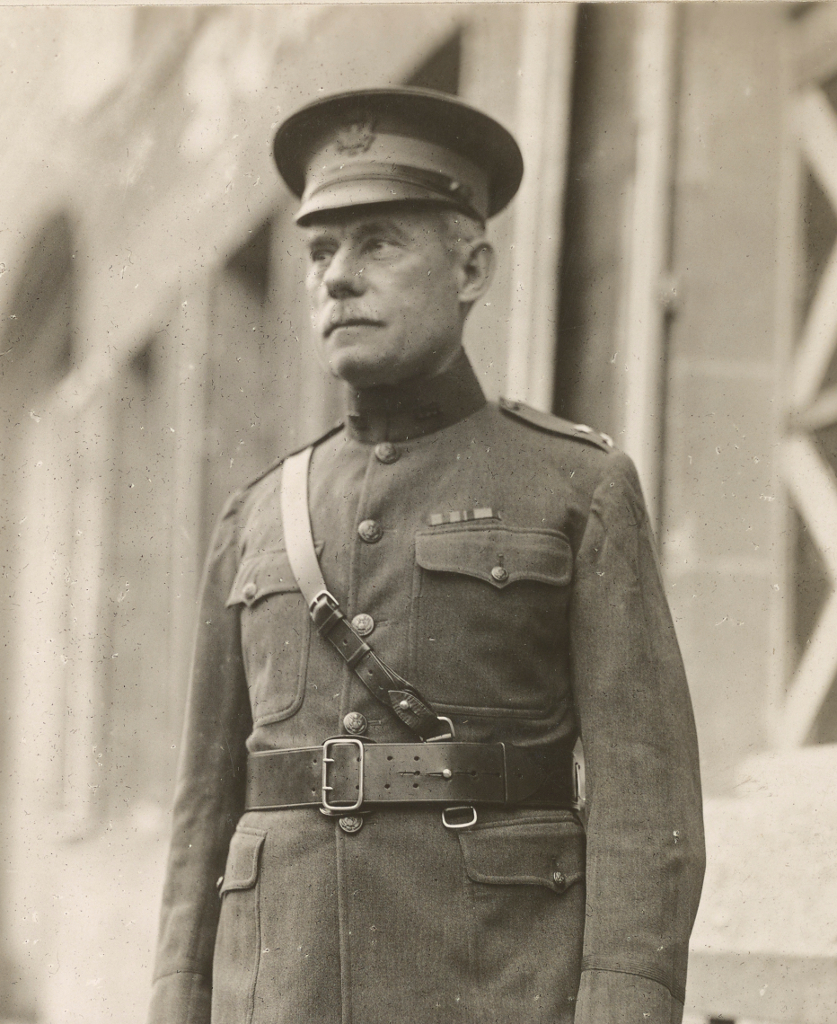
- James McRae in Chatel-Chéhéry, France, October 25, 1918.
- Born: December 24, 1863; Lumber City, Georgia, United States
- Died: May 1, 1940 (aged 76); Berkeley, California, United States
- Burial place: Arlington National Cemetery, Virginia, United States
- Military career
- Allegiance: United States
- Branch: United States Army
- Service years: 1886–1927
- Rank: Major General
- Service number: 0-52
- Unit: Infantry Branch
- Commands: 158th Depot Brigade; 9th Brigade; 78th Division; 5th Corps Area; Philippine Department; 9th Corps Area; 2nd Corps Area
- Conflicts: Spanish–American War; Philippine–American War; World War I
- Awards: Army Distinguished Service Medal; Silver Star (2); Companion of the Order of the Bath (United Kingdom); Commander of the Legion of Honor (France); Croix de Guerre (France)

Major General James Henry McRae (December 24, 1863 – May 1, 1940) was a United States Army officer who served in numerous conflicts during his military career.

== Early life ==
James Henry McRae was born December 24, 1863, to Daniel F. McRae and Marion McRae in Lumber City, Georgia.

He graduated from the United States Military Academy number forty-eight of seventy-seven in the class of 1886. Several of his classmates included men who would, like McRae himself, eventually rise to general officer rank, such as John J. Pershing, Charles T. Menoher, Walter Henry Gordon, Edward Mann Lewis, Mason Patrick, Julius Penn, Avery D. Andrews, John E. McMahon, Frank L. Winn, William H. Hay, George B. Duncan, Lucien Grant Berry, Malvern Hill Barnum, Benjamin A. Poore, Henry C. Newcomer and Jesse McI. Carter.

== Military career ==
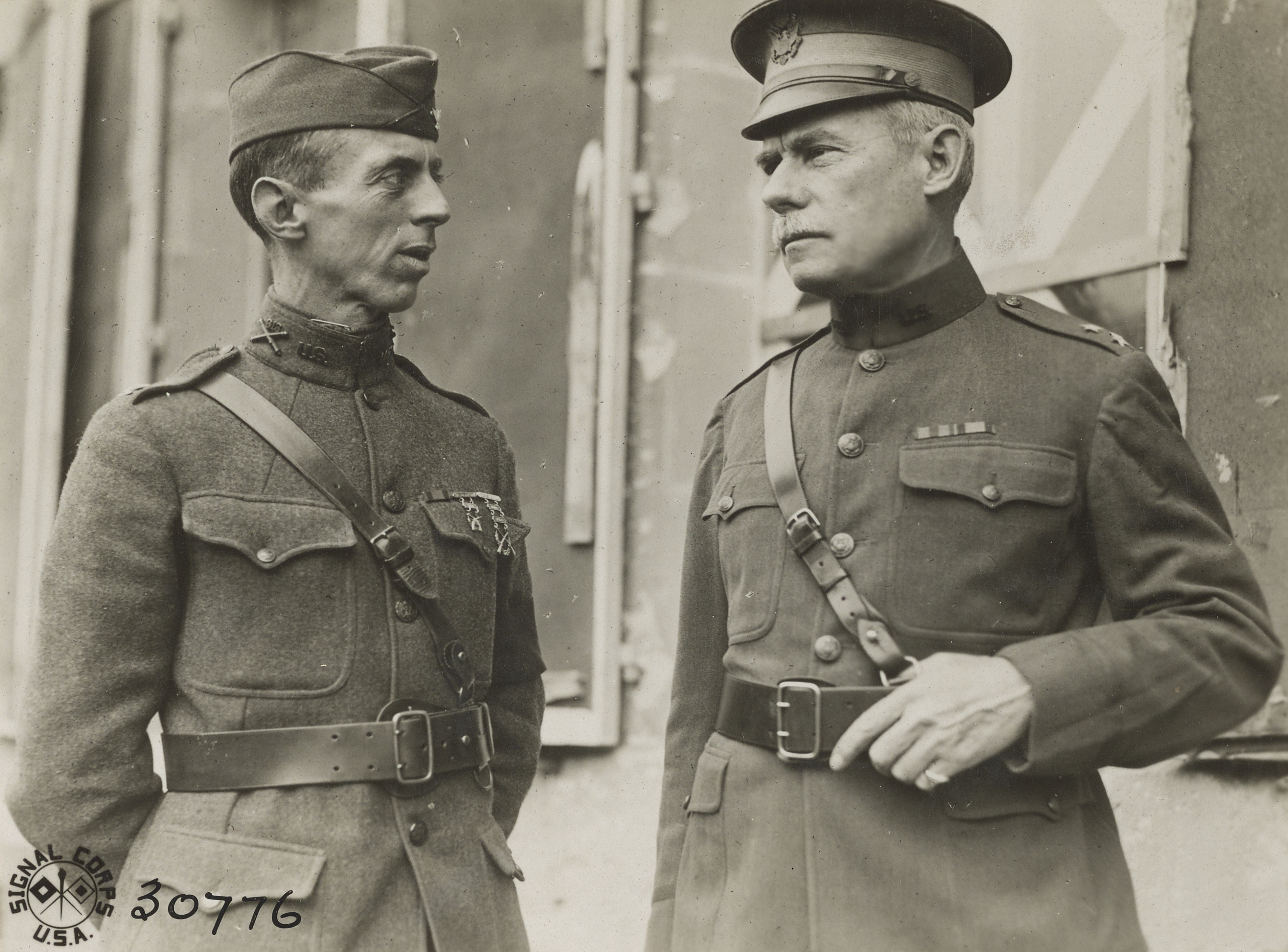
Major General James McRae, commanding the 78th Division, pictured here in conversation with the division's chief of staff, Colonel Charles D. Herron, at Chatel Chehery, Ardennes, France, October 25, 1918.

McRae was commissioned in the 3rd U.S. Infantry Regiment (The Old Guard) and performed frontier duty from 1886 to 1888. During the Spanish–American War, he was in the Battle of El Caney in Cuba, and he also served in the Sanitary Corps, for which he received his first Silver Star Commendation. He received his second Silver Star during the Philippine Insurrection and was recommended for a brevet promotion. From 1905 to 1908, he served on the General Staff, and in 1911, he graduated from the United States Army War College. McRae served in the Adjutant General's Department from 1913 to 1917, and on August 5, 1917, he was promoted to brigadier general and commanded the 158th Depot Brigade at Camp Sherman, Ohio. In addition, he commanded the 9th Brigade of the 5th Division. He was promoted to major general on April 12, 1918, and commanded the 78th Division (AEF) throughout its period of active service on the Western Front until June 1919, when it was inactivated after returning to the United States. For this, he earned the Army Distinguished Service Medal, the citation for which reads:

The President of the United States of America, authorized by Act of Congress, July 9, 1918, takes pleasure in presenting the Army Distinguished Service Medal to Major General James Henry McRae, United States Army, for exceptionally meritorious and distinguished services to the Government of the United States, in a duty of great responsibility during World War I. General McRae Commanded with great credit the 78th Division in the Meuse-Argonne offensive and had an important part in that operation which forced the enemy to abandon Grandpre. In this and other campaigns his personal influence on the result obtained showed a rich quality of military leadership.

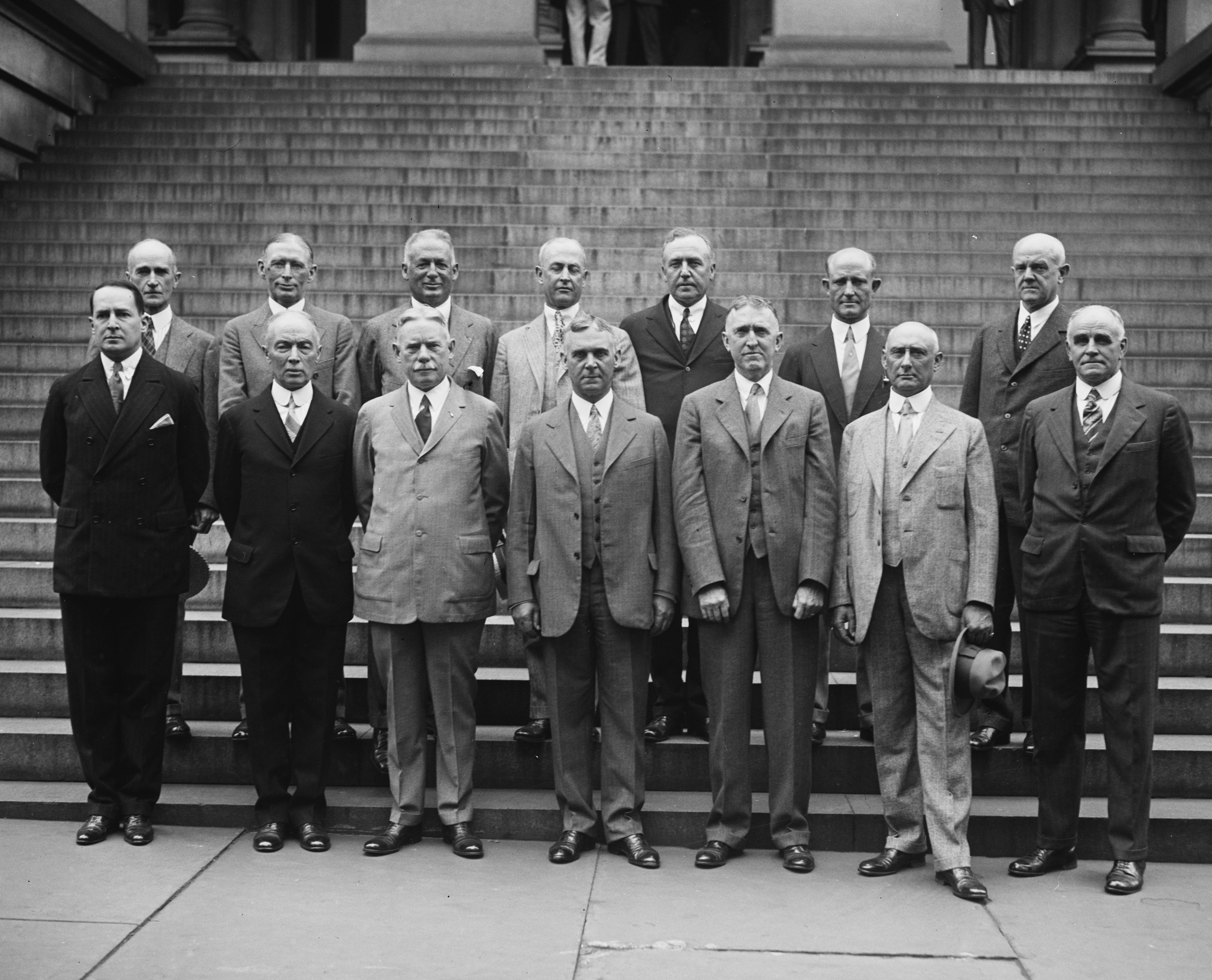
Corps area commanders and division commanders meet with the army chief of staff, Major General Charles Pelot Summerall, at the War Department, May 1927. Stood in the front row, third on the left, is Major General James H. McRae, commanding the Second Corps Area.

During 1921 and 1922, he was assistant chief, G-1 (personnel). From 1922 to 1924, he commanded the 5th Corps Area and, in 1924, he briefly commanded the Philippine Division, and from 1924 to 1926 he served in the Philippine Department. He commanded the 9th Corps Area from May 1926 to January 1927 before commanding the 2nd Corps Area from January to December 1927. He retired on December 24, 1927, having reached the mandatory retirement age of 64.

== Personal life ==
On December 14, 1887, McRae married Florence Stouch, daughter of Lt. Col. R. H. Stouch, a Civil War veteran. Together they had three children: Donald M. McRae, Dorothy McRae, and Mildred McRae. He remarried to Helen "Nellie" Burgar Stouch, a former sister-in-law, on February 24, 1926.

After his retirement, he made his home in Berkeley, California. He died on May 1, 1940. McRae is buried in Arlington National Cemetery.

Military offices
Preceded by James T. Dean	Commanding General 78th Division; 1918–1919	Succeeded by Post deactivated
Preceded by George W. Read	Commanding General Philippine Department; 1924–1925	Succeeded by William Weigel
