= John E. McMahon =

American Major General (1860-1920)

John Eugene McMahon
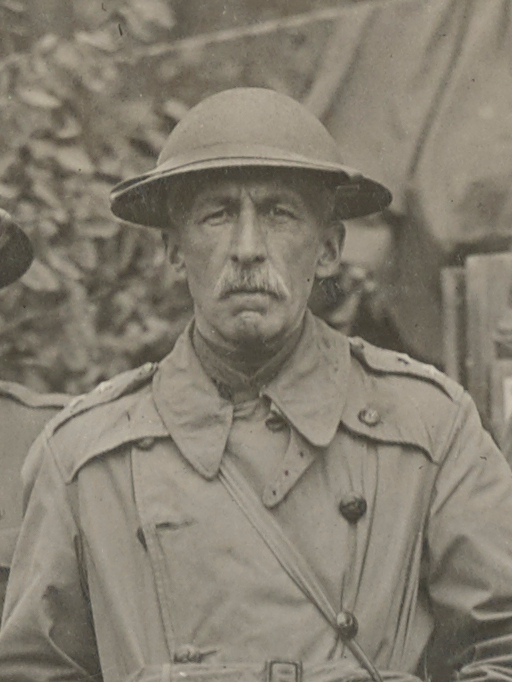
- Major General McMahon in 1918
- Born: December 8, 1860; Buffalo, New York, U.S.
- Died: January 28, 1920 (aged 59); Princeton, New Jersey, U.S.
- Burial place: Oak Hill Cemetery; Washington, D.C., U.S.
- Relatives: John E. McMahon Jr. (son)
- Military career
- Allegiance: United States
- Branch: United States Army
- Service years: 1886–1919
- Rank: Major General
- Service number: 0-3541
- Units: Artillery Corps; Field Artillery Branch
- Commands: 160th Field Artillery Brigade; 168th Field Artillery Brigade; 5th Division; 41st Division
- Conflicts: Spanish–American War; Philippine–American War; World War I

Major General John Eugene McMahon (December 8, 1860 – January 28, 1920) was a United States Army officer who served in numerous conflicts, most notably in World War I, where he commanded the 5th Division. He also was the father of John E. McMahon Jr. (1890–1971), a career Army officer who attained the rank of brigadier general.

== Early life ==
McMahon was born on December 8, 1860, in Buffalo, New York, to Colonel John E. McMahon and Esther Bryan McMahon. He graduated from Fordham University in 1880 with an A.B. degree, and he entered the United States Military Academy (USMA) at West Point, New York, and graduated number eleven of seventy-seven in the class of 1886. Several of his classmates included men who would, like McMahon himself, eventually rise to general officer rank, such as John J. Pershing, Charles T. Menoher, Walter Henry Gordon, Edward Mann Lewis, Mason Patrick, Julius Penn, Avery D. Andrews, George B. Duncan, Ernest Hinds, William H. Hay, James McRae, Lucien Grant Berry and Jesse McI. Carter.

== Early military career ==
McMahon was commissioned in the Fourth Artillery, Artillery Corps. From 1891 to 1895, he was an aide to General Alexander McDowell McCook. During the Spanish–American War, he was the adjutant general of Second Brigade, Provisional Division, from June to July 1898. He was in Puerto Rico in 1898 and 1899, and served during the Philippine–American War.

He served in the Spanish-American War and was promoted again, this time to captain, in May 1898, and was also made an assistant adjutant general. That same year saw him graduate from the Artillery School. In July 1899 he became a major in the 31st Infantry and, following the end of the Philippine–American War which he briefly participated in, McMahon was mustered out in June 1901, after having been made a captain of Artillery in January of that year.

In January 1907 he was promoted to a major of Artillery before being assigned to the newly created Field Artillery Branch. While serving on the General Staff from 1911 to 1914 he was promoted to lieutenant colonel in May 1911, before being made a colonel several years later, in June 1916, by which time World War I had been raging for almost two years.

== World War I ==
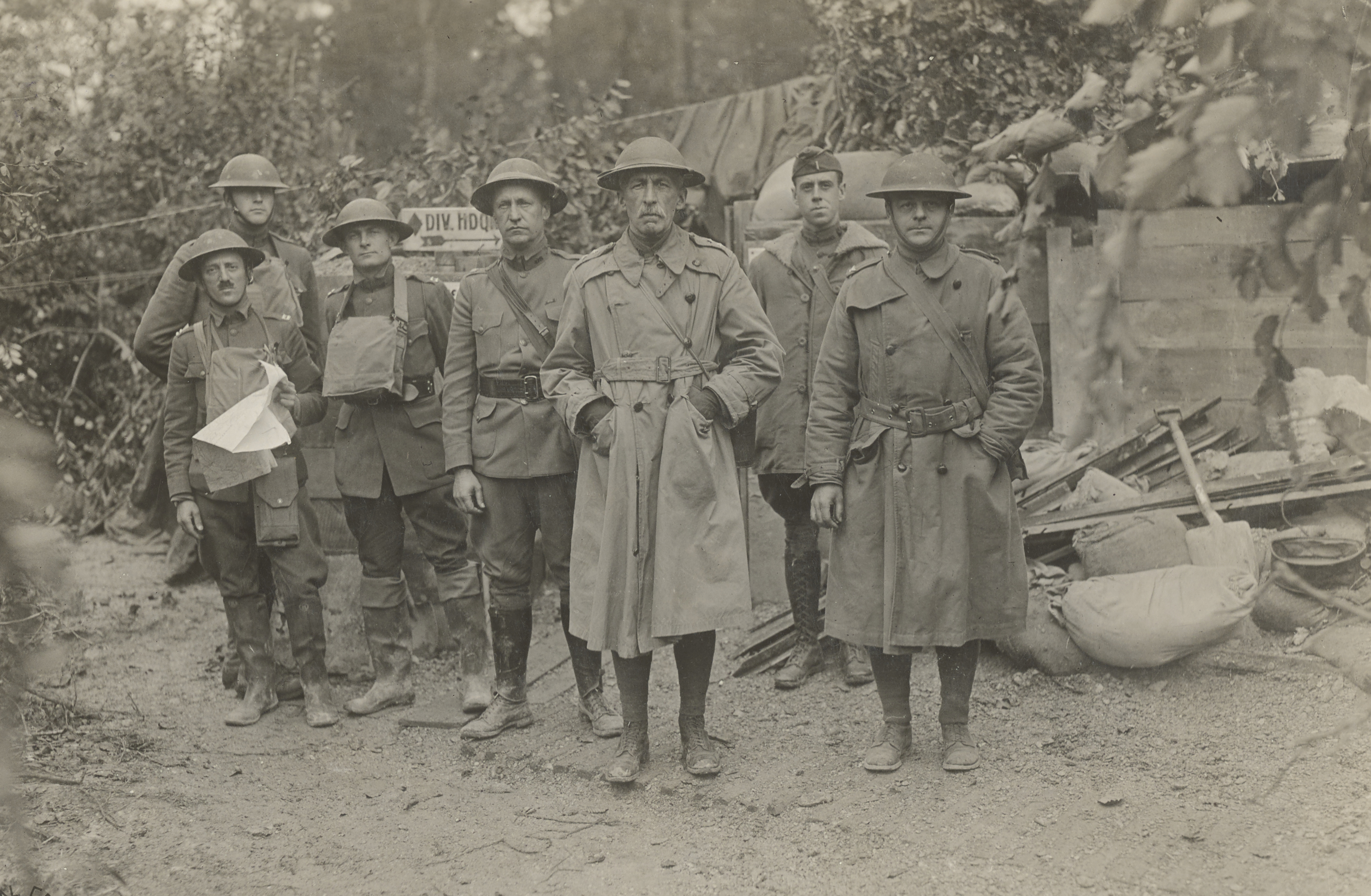
Major General McMahon (center), commander of the 5th Division, and members of his staff in France, October 15, 1918. Stood to the left of McMahon is his chief of staff, Colonel Clement A. Trott.

In late August 1917, almost five months after the American entry into World War I, McMahon was promoted to the temporary rank of brigadier general and was assigned to command the 160th Field Artillery Brigade, part of the 85th Division. His assignment there was only brief before he took over the 167th Field Artillery Brigade, part of the 92nd Division, at Camp Dix, New Jersey. He was in command of the brigade until December when he took command of the newly activated 5th Division, then being formed and organized at Camp Logan, Texas.

As a result of his new command he received another promotion, this time to the temporary rank of major general, in February 1918. Under his direction, the division, created from Regular Army units stationed around the United States, began to depart for service overseas with the American Expeditionary Forces (AEF) in France, with the first units stepping foot in France in March. In order to ready itself for combat against the Imperial German Army, the division began training in the Anould and Saint-Dié sectors, near the Vosges mountains. When this was concluded it then took part in the Battle of Saint-Mihiel in mid-September 1918.

With the battle over, the division rested for a while before being called upon to take part in the Meuse–Argonne offensive, where McMahon was relieved of his command of the 5th Division in mid-October, with the division by now badly disorganised and suffering from low morale, the blame for which was placed on McMahon. Major General Hanson Edward Ely, an experienced infantry brigade commander, took his place. He was then very briefly assigned to command the 41st Division before returning home to the United States.

== Postwar years ==
He retired as a colonel due to disabilities in October 1919 and he died in late January, aged just 59, the following year. His rank of major general was restored posthumously in 1930.

== Personal life ==
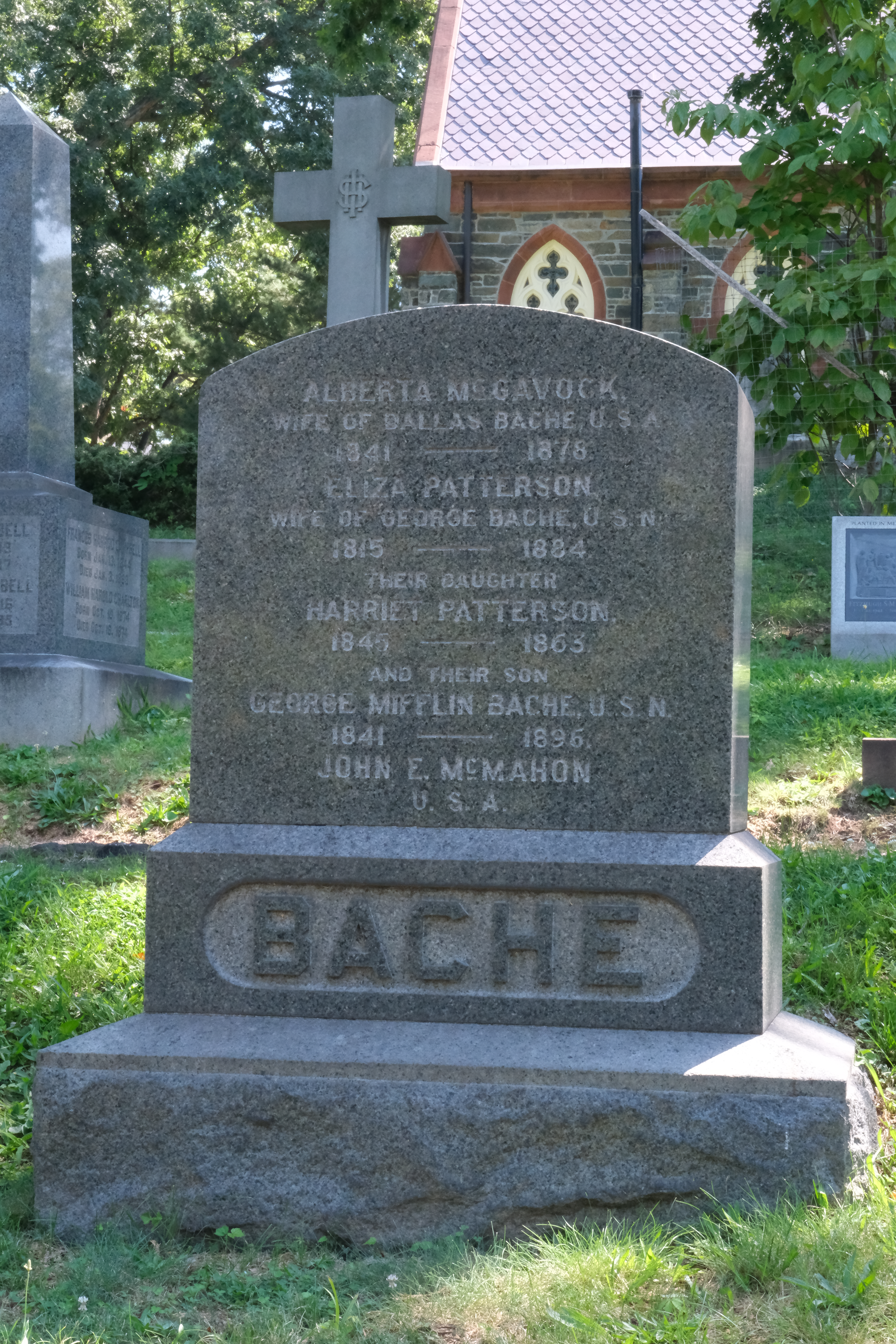
Grave of McMahon at Oak Hill Cemetery

He married Caroline Bache on May 12, 1888, and was a modern languages instructor at the United States Military Academy from 1890 to 1891. He died in Princeton, New Jersey, at the age of 59 on January 28, 1920. He was buried at Oak Hill Cemetery in Washington, D.C.

== Bibliography ==
- Cooke, James J. (1997). Pershing and his Generals: Command and Staff in the AEF. Praeger Publishers. ISBN 0-275-95363-7.
- Davis, Henry Blaine Jr. (1998). Generals in Khaki. Raleigh, North Carolina: Pentland Press. ISBN 1571970886. OCLC 40298151.
- Rudd, Herbert Finley (2017). The Official History of the Fifth Division, U. S. A.: During the Period of Its Organization and of Its Operations in the European World War, 1917-1919. The Red Diamond (Meuse) Division. Forgotten Books. ISBN 978-1331115298.

Military offices
| Preceded by Newly activated organization | Commanding General 5th Division; January–October 1918 | Succeeded by Hanson E. Ely |
