= Albert Decatur Kniskern =

American general (1861–1930)

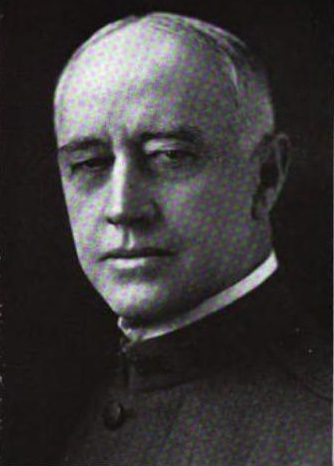
- From the November 1918 issue of The Inland Printer magazine
- Born: December 2, 1861; Monee, Illinois
- Died: November 19, 1930 (aged 68); Villa Park, Illinois
- Burial place: Riverside Cemetery, Hastings, Michigan
- Spouse: Estelle A. Wheeler (m. 1886–1930, his death)
- Children: 2
- Military career
- Allegiance: United States
- Service: United States Army
- Service years: 1886–1887, 1891–1919
- Rank: Brigadier General
- Service number: 0-13385
- Units: U.S. Army Infantry Branch; U.S. Army Quartermaster Corps
- Commands: Chief Commissary of Subsistence, Mobile Depot; Chief Commissary of Subsistence, Miami Depot; Chief Commissary of Subsistence, St. Louis Depot; Chief Commissary of Subsistence, Fort Sheridan; Chicago Quartermaster Depot
- Wars: Spanish–American War; Philippine–American War; World War I
- Awards: Army Distinguished Service Medal

Albert Decatur Kniskern (December 2, 1861 – November 19, 1930) attended the United States Military Academy and was a brigadier general during World War I.

== Early life ==
Albert D. Kniskern was born in Monee, Illinois on December 2, 1861, the son of Philip W. Kniskern and Cornelia Louisa (Goodenow) Kniskern. Kniskern's surname was originally "Niskern"; he changed it to "Kniskern" in 1904. He graduated from Hastings High School in Hastings, Michigan in 1882, then began attendance at the United States Military Academy (West Point). He graduated 25th of 77 in the class of 1886.

== Awards ==
Kniskern was a recipient of the Army Distinguished Service Medal for his World War I service, the citation for which reads:

The President of the United States of America, authorized by Act of Congress, July 9, 1918, takes pleasure in presenting the Army Distinguished Service Medal to Brigadier General Albert Decatur Kniskern, United States Army, for exceptionally meritorious and distinguished services to the Government of the United States, in a duty of great responsibility during World War I, in the organization and development of the Supply System in the General Supply Depot, Chicago, Illinois.

== Family ==
On July 1, 1886, Kniskern married Estelle A. (Wheeler) Kniskern. They were the parents of sons Lewis T. and Philip W.
