= William H. Hay =

United States Army general (1860–1946)

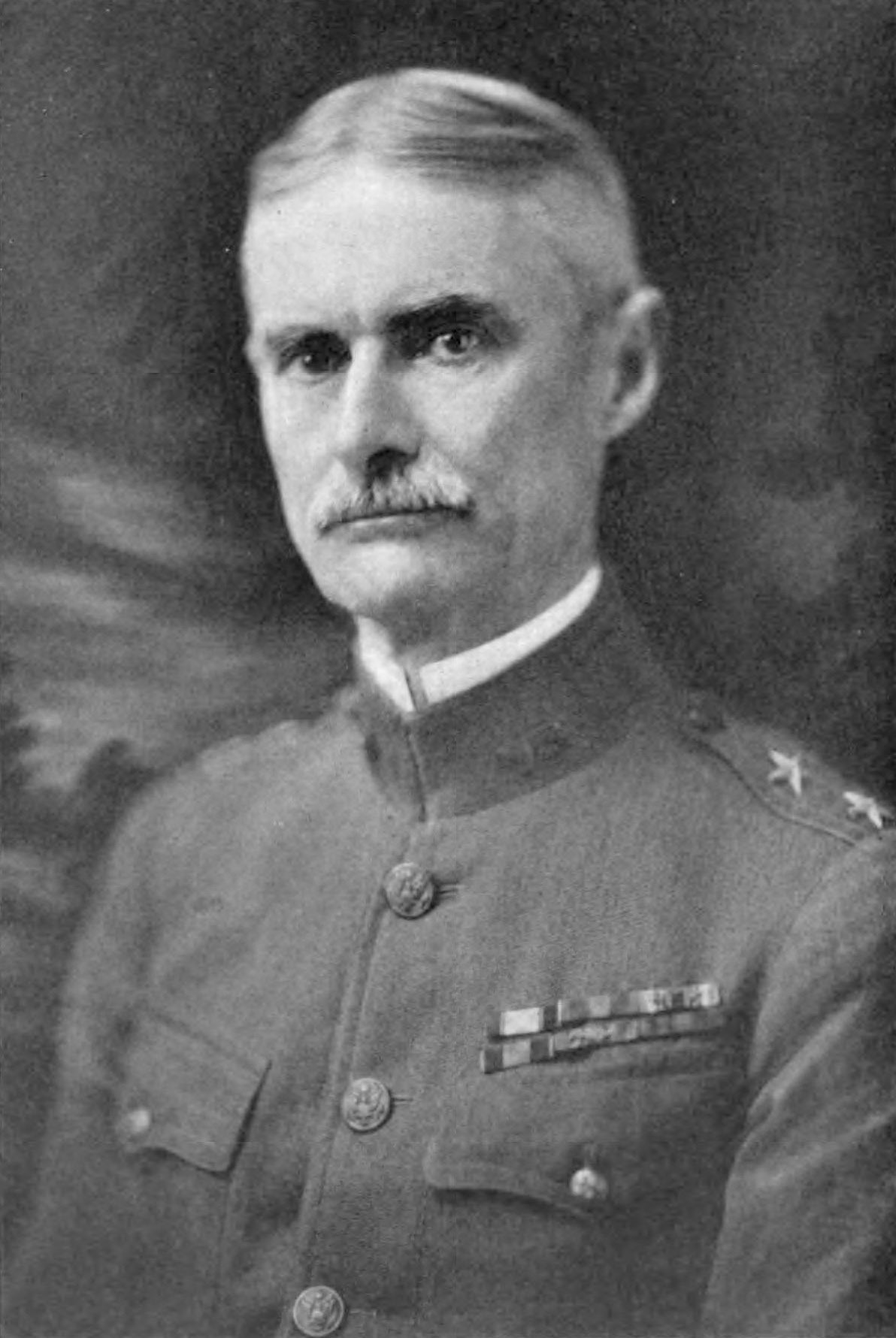
- William H. Hay as commander of the 28th Division in World War I.
- Born: July 16, 1860; Drifton, Florida
- Died: December 17, 1946 (aged 86); New York City, New York
- Burial place: West Point Cemetery
- Spouse: Edith Carman (m. 1887–1946, his death)
- Children: 4
- Military career
- Allegiance: United States of America
- Branch: United States Army
- Service years: 1886–1922
- Rank: Major General
- Nickname: "Dad"
- Service number: 0-162
- Unit: Cavalry Branch
- Commands: 3rd Squadron, 3rd Cavalry; 15th Cavalry Regiment; 184th Infantry Brigade; 28th Division; Intermediate Service Section, Army Services of Supply; Camp Custer, Michigan; 1st Cavalry Brigade
- Conflicts: Spanish–American War; World War I
- Awards: Army Distinguished Service Medal; Croix de Guerre; Legion of Honor (Commander); Order of the Black Star (Commander); Order of Leopold (Commander).
- Other work: Construction supervisor, Camp Smith, New York

William Henry Hay (July 16, 1860 – December 17, 1946) was a United States Army officer who attained the rank of major general as the commander of the 28th Division in the final days of World War I.

== Early life ==
William Henry Hay was born in Drifton, Florida, on July 16, 1860. His father, Turner Hay, was an Army veteran of the Seminole Wars, and served in Harney's Dragoons. Turner Hay also served in the Confederate States Army during the American Civil War, and took part in the battles at Olustee and Natural Bridge.

William Hay graduated 46th of 77 from the United States Military Academy in 1886, and was a classmate of John J. Pershing. Hay was 22 years old when admitted to West Point, older than all his classmates by several years. As a result, his fellow cadets referred to him as "Dad," the nickname by which he continued to be known.

== Start of Career ==
Hay was commissioned as a second lieutenant in the 3rd Cavalry Regiment, and served in Texas at Fort Davis, Fort Clark, and the Post at San Antonio. He then attended the School of Application for Infantry and Cavalry at Fort Leavenworth, after which he served with the 10th Cavalry Regiment at Fort Custer, Montana.

== Spanish–American War ==
During the Spanish–American War Hay was a temporary captain in the United States Volunteers and detailed to the quartermaster service. He spent four years in Cuba as collector of customs at Matanzas and deputy to Tasker Bliss, who was the head of the Cuban Customs Service. Hay was fluent in Spanish, both spoken and written, which enabled him to effectively reorganize and administer the wharves, warehouses, and offices under his jurisdiction.

== Post-Spanish–American War ==
After the war Hay reverted to his permanent rank of First Lieutenant. From 1902 to 1905 Hay served throughout the Department of the Missouri with the 10th Cavalry. From 1905 to 1909 he was Professor of Military Science at Pennsylvania State University. He then served with the 10th Cavalry at Fort Ethan Allen, Vermont.

Hay was an expert marksman and was on the U.S. Cavalry National Rifle Team for several years, including a period as the team captain.

In 1913 Hay graduated from the Army War College, afterwards remaining on the faculty. In 1914 and 1915 he was chief of staff of the Army's Southern Department and its Cavalry Division.

In the years immediately preceding World War I Hay served with the 4th Cavalry, briefly commanded 3rd Squadron, 3rd Cavalry, and was then assigned to the 15th Cavalry in the Philippines. In July 1916 Hay was promoted to colonel as commander of the 15th Cavalry.

== World War I ==
At the start of World War I Hay was promoted to temporary Brigadier General as commander of the 184th Infantry Brigade, a subordinate command of the 92nd Division, an organization of African-American soldiers and white officers. He led the brigade during combat in France, including combat in the Saint-Dié-des-Vosges area and the Meuse-Argonne Offensive.

As was the case with the 93rd Division, the 92nd fought primarily in French sectors, since American and British senior commanders did not want these segregated units fighting in proximity to organizations composed of white soldiers. Despite his success at leading black troops in combat, Hay supposedly expressed a low opinion of African-American soldiers, and argued against allowing them to attend officer training or serve in leadership roles. In contrast, Emmett Jay Scott wrote in 1919 of Hay's praise for African-American soldiers during a ceremony shortly before they returned to the United States: "I have been with colored troops for 25 years, and I have never seen better soldiers than the drafted men who composed this (92nd) division." On October 26, 1918, Hay was promoted to temporary Major General and assigned to command of the 28th Division after Charles H. Muir was elevated to command of IV Corps. He continued to command the division until the end of the war in November, and remained in command until Muir again assumed command and the division returned to the United States in April, 1919. From April to June, 1919 Hay commanded the Intermediate Section of the Army's Services of Supply, afterwards returning to the United States.

For his services during the war Hay was awarded the Army Distinguished Service Medal, the French French Croix de Guerre, Legion of Honor (Commander) and Order of the Black Star (Commander), and the Belgian Order of Leopold (Commander). The citation for his Army DSM reads:

The President of the United States of America, authorized by Act of Congress, July 9, 1918, takes pleasure in presenting the Army Distinguished Service Medal to Major General William Henry Hay, United States Army, for exceptionally meritorious and distinguished services to the Government of the United States, in a duty of great responsibility during World War I. As Commander of the 184th Infantry Brigade, General Hay showed efficient leadership. Promoted to Major Generalship in the early part of October 1918, he took command of the 28th Division, and by his marked ability and great energy he contributed to the successes attained by the Division during the time in which he was in command. He rendered services of a high character to the American Expeditionary Forces.

== Post-World War I ==
From June, 1919 to July, 1920 Hay was commander of Camp Custer, Michigan. In July, 1920 he reverted to his permanent rank of colonel and was assigned as inspector general of the American Forces in Germany, with headquarters at Koblenz.

In May, 1921 he was assigned as chief of staff of the American Forces in Germany, where he remained until his 1922 promotion to permanent brigadier general and command of the 1st Cavalry Brigade at Camp Harry J. Jones, near Douglas, Arizona.

In 1922 his wife and he sustained injuries in an automobile accident, which led to his retirement from the military in 1924.

After a year convalescing from his injuries, from 1926 to 1939 Hay was superintendent of Camp Smith, the New York National Guard's training site.

In 1930 his two-star rank was restored when Congress passed legislation allowing general officers from World War I to retire at the highest rank they had held.

== Death and burial ==
Hay retired in 1939 and resided in New York City. He died in Glen Cove, New York, on December 17, 1946, and was buried at the United States Military Academy Cemetery, Section 8K, Site 123.

== Family ==
In 1887, Hay married Edith Carman (1864–1958). They were the parents of four sons: Thomas Robson (1888–1974); William Wren (1890–1980); Edward Northup (1891–1958); and Richard Carman (1893–1930).

Military offices
Preceded by Charles Henry Muir	Commanding General 28th Infantry Division; 1918–1919	Succeeded by Charles Henry Muir
