= American Expeditionary Forces order of battle =

World War I order of battle

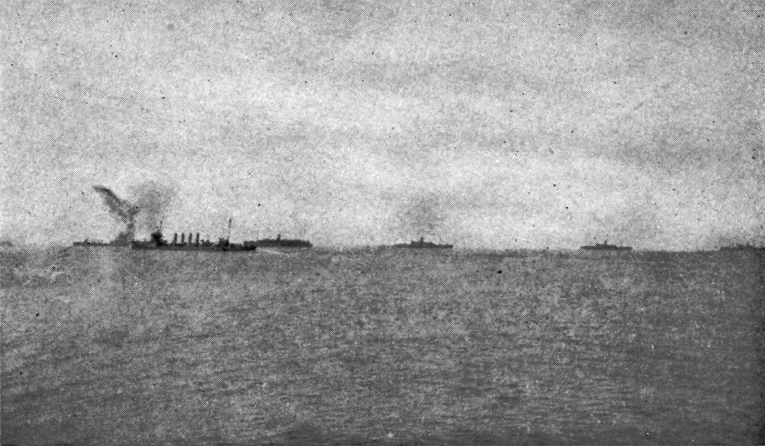
Troop ships of the first American convoy in 1917. The ships are the Henderson, Antilles, Momus and Lenape.

This is the American Expeditionary Forces on the Western Front order of battle. The American Expeditionary Forces (AEF) consisted of the United States Armed Forces (mostly the United States Army) that were sent to Europe in World War I to support the Allied cause against the Central Powers. During the United States campaigns in World War I the AEF fought in France alongside French and British allied forces in the last year of the war, against Imperial German forces. Some of the troops fought alongside Italian forces in that same year, against Austro-Hungarian forces. Late in the war American units also fought in Siberia and North Russia.

President Woodrow Wilson created the AEF in May 1917, originally appointing Major General John J. Pershing, who was later promoted to general, as commander. Barely any American troops were sent to Europe in 1917, since Pershing ordered all AEF forces to be well-trained before going overseas.

The troop ships used to transport the AEF were, at first, any ships that were available. Cruisers, German ships seized by the Navy, ships borrowed from the Allies, and many other ships were used to ship troops to Europe from ports in New York, New Jersey, and Virginia. By June 1917, only 14,000 soldiers had made it to the front lines, but by May 1918 over two million American troops had reached Europe, with around half of them on the front lines.

The AEF helped the French Army on the Western Front during the Aisne Offensive (at Château-Thierry and Belleau Wood) in June 1918, and fought its major actions in the Saint-Mihiel and Meuse–Argonne Offensives in late 1918. Organized into two field armies (a third was forming as the war ended), it had a total strength of about two million men in Europe by the time of the Armistice. Planned to eventually consist of nine corps, a total of five AEF corps and two unassigned divisions were in the field by September 1918. (Note: U.S. divisions consisted of two large infantry brigades and an artillery brigade. Each division also had a Headquarters, Signals, and Engineer battalion. The total strength of each AEF division was approximately 28,000 men, more than twice that of other Allied or German formations.) It was subsequently involved in the Occupation of the Rhineland.

== First Army ==
The First Army was officially organized and activated by General John J. Pershing on 4 July 1918, although it was technically formed when the United States entered the World War in 1917. It served in the Saint-Mihiel offensive, Lorraine offensive, Champagne offensive, and the Meuse–Argonne Offensive. It was finally demobilized and moved back to the United States on 30 April 1919.

First Army (structure as of the Battle of Saint-Mihiel)(30 August to 16 September 1918) General John J. Pershing (10 August 1918 – 16 October 1918)
Name	Commander	Notes
I Corps	Major General Hunter Liggett	Formed 15–20 January 1918
IV Corps	Major General George Windle Read	Formed on 20 June 1918
V Corps	Major General William M. Wright	Formed on 7–12 July 1918
French II Colonial Corps	Lieutenant General Ernest Joseph Blondlat	Formed in June 1915
Sources: Unless otherwise cited, the source is Army War College Historical Section (1988a) [1931]. The American Expeditionary Forces: General Headquarters, Armies, Army Corps, Services of Supply, Separate Forces (PDF). Order of Battle of the United States Land Forces in the World War. Vol. I. CMH Pub 23-1. Washington, D.C.: United States Army Center of Military History. OCLC 183412729. Archived from the original (PDF) on 13 February 2015.

== Second Army ==
The Second Army was activated on 9 September and was organized by Colonel Stuart Heintzelman. On 12 October 1918, General Robert Lee Bullard took command of the Second Army and Heintzelman became his chief of staff. The formation was committed to the Lorraine offensive on 26 October. It attacked in the Lorraine area, and also around Saint-Mihiel, before later recapturing and liberating the Duchy of Luxemburg. It was demobilized on 15 April 1919, after the war had ended.

Second Army (structure as of the period from 16 October 1918 to 11 November 1918) Lieutenant General Robert Lee Bullard (12 October 1918 – 15 April 1919)
Name	Commander	Notes
IV Corps	Major General George Windle Read	Formed on 20 June 1918
VI Corps	Major General Charles C. Ballou	Formed on 1 August 1918
VII Corps	Major General Omar Bundy	Formed on 19 August 1918
French II Colonial Corps	Major General Henri Edouard Claudel	Formed in June 1915
XVII Corps (France)	Lieutenant General Frederio Emile Amedee Hellot	Part of the peacetime French Army in 1914
Sources: Unless otherwise cited, the source is Army War College Historical Section (1988a) [1931]. The American Expeditionary Forces: General Headquarters, Armies, Army Corps, Services of Supply, Separate Forces (PDF). Order of Battle of the United States Land Forces in the World War. Vol. I. CMH Pub 23-1. Washington, D.C.: United States Army Center of Military History. OCLC 183412729. Archived from the original (PDF) on 13 February 2015.

== Third Army ==
Following the defeat of Germany, Allied forces occupied the Rhineland under the terms of the Armistice. The United States provided around 240,000 men in nine veteran divisions, nearly a third of the total occupying force, for this task. These troops were organized into the Third Army, which was established by Pershing specifically for the purpose, under the command of Major General Joseph Dickman.

Third Army (structure as of the period from 17 to 22 November 1918) Major General Joseph T. Dickman (15 November 1918 – 29 April 1919)
Name	Commander	Notes
III Corps	Major General William M. Wright	Formed on 16 May 1918
IV Corps	Major General George Windle Read	Formed on 20 June 1918
Sources: Unless otherwise cited, the source is Army War College Historical Section (1988a) [1931]. The American Expeditionary Forces: General Headquarters, Armies, Army Corps, Services of Supply, Separate Forces (PDF). Order of Battle of the United States Land Forces in the World War. Vol. I. CMH Pub 23-1. Washington, D.C.: United States Army Center of Military History. OCLC 183412729. Archived from the original (PDF) on 13 February 2015.

== I Corps ==
Lieutenant General Hunter Liggett took command of I Corps when it was created, almost one year after the Americans entered the war. It served through most of the battles that the American Expeditionary Forces fought on the Western Front.

Assisted by the French XXXII Corps, I Corps was organized and activated on 15–20 January 1918. I Corps saw its first major action at the Battle of Chateau-Thierry, while seeing its first offensive action several days later at the Second Battle of the Marne. After serving briefly in the defensive sectors of Lorraine and Champagne, I Corps later served in the Battle of Saint-Mihiel and the Meuse–Argonne Offensive. It was finally demobilized on 25 March 1919.

I Corps (structure as of the Battle of Saint-Mihiel)(10 August to 17 September 1918) Lieutenant General Hunter Liggett
Name	Commander	Units	Notes
1st Infantry Division	Major General Charles P. Summerall	1st Infantry Brigade; 16th Infantry Regiment; 18th Infantry Regiment; 2nd Machine Gun Battalion; 2nd Infantry Brigade; 26th Infantry Regiment; 28th Infantry Regiment; 3rd Machine Gun Battalion; 1st Field Artillery Brigade; 5th Field Artillery Regiment; 6th Field Artillery Regiment; 7th Field Artillery Regiment; 1st Trench Mortar Battery	
2nd Infantry Division	Brigadier General Charles A. Doyen, USMC	3rd Infantry Brigade; 9th Infantry Regiment; 23rd Infantry Regiment; 5th Machine Gun Battalion; 4th Marine Brigade; 5th Marine Regiment; 6th Marine Regiment; 6th Machine Gun Battalion (USMC); 2nd Field Artillery Brigade; 12th Field Artillery Regiment; 15th Field Artillery Regiment; 17th Field Artillery Regiment; 2nd Trench Mortar Battery	Division included troops of the United States Marine Corps (USMC)
26th Infantry Division	Major General Clarence Ransom Edwards	51st Infantry Brigade; 101st Infantry Regiment; 102nd Infantry Regiment; 102 Machine Gun Battalion; 52nd Infantry Brigade; 103 Infantry Regiment; 104th Infantry Regiment; 103 Machine Gun Battalion; 51st Field Artillery Brigade; 101st Field Artillery Regiment; 102nd Field Artillery Regiment; 103rd Field Artillery Regiment; 101st Trench Mortar Battery	
32nd Infantry Division	Major General James Parker	63rd Infantry Brigade; 125th Infantry Regiment; 126th Infantry Regiment; 120th Machine Gun Battalion; 64th Infantry Brigade; 127th Infantry Regiment; 128th Infantry Regiment; 121st Machine Gun Battalion; 57th Field Artillery Brigade; 119th Field Artillery Regiment; 120th Field Artillery Regiment; 121st Field Artillery Regiment; 107th Trench Mortar Battery	
41st Infantry Division	was separated into multiple other units before a commander could be announced	81st Infantry Brigade; 161st Infantry Regiment; 162nd Infantry Regiment; 147th Machine Gun Battalion; 82nd Infantry Brigade; 163rd Infantry Regiment; 164th Infantry Regiment; 148th Machine Gun Battalion; 66th Field Artillery Brigade; 146th Field Artillery Regiment; 147th Field Artillery Regiment; 148th Field Artillery Regiment; 116th Trench Mortar Battery	
42nd Infantry Division	Major General William Abram Mann	83rd Infantry Brigade; 165th Infantry Regiment; 166th Infantry Regiment; 150th Machine Gun Battalion; 84th Infantry Brigade; 167th Infantry Regiment; 168th Infantry Regiment; 151st Machine Gun Battalion; 67th Field Artillery Brigade; 149th Field Artillery Regiment; 150th Field Artillery Regiment; 151st Field Artillery Regiment; 117th Trench Mortar Battery	
Sources: Unless otherwise cited, the source is Gibbons, Floyd Phillips (2014) [1918]. And They Thought We Wouldn't Fight. Chicago: The Lakeside Press. OCLC 897378714.

== II Corps ==
II Corps was organized in January 1918 with its headquarters being located in Montreuil, France. It moved to the Western Front in February 1918, and served in the Second Battle of the Somme and the Third Battle of Albert. It mostly served alongside the New Zealand Division and the Australian Corps. After the Armistice, II Corps was reassigned to the Third Army's control, before being demobilized on 1 February 1919.

II Corps (structure as of Post-Armistice activities)(19 November 1918 to 31 January 1919) Lieutenant General Robert Lee Bullard
Name	Commander	Units
27th Infantry Division	Major General John F. O'Ryan	53rd Infantry Brigade; 105th Infantry Regiment; 106th Infantry Regiment; 105th Machine Gun Battalion; 54th Infantry Brigade; 107th Infantry Regiment; 108th Infantry Regiment; 106th Machine Gun Battalion; 52nd Field Artillery Brigade; 104th Field Artillery Regiment; 105th Field Artillery Regiment; 106th Field Artillery Regiment; 102nd Trench Mortar Battery
28th Infantry Division	Major General Charles H. Muir	55th Infantry Brigade; 109th Infantry Regiment; 110th Infantry Regiment; 109th Machine Gun Battalion; 56th Infantry Brigade; 111th Infantry Regiment; 112th Infantry Regiment; 110th Machine Gun Battalion; 53rd Field Artillery Brigade; 107th Field Artillery Regiment; 108th Field Artillery Regiment; 103rd Trench Mortar Battery
30th Infantry Division	Major General Edward Mann Lewis	59th Infantry Brigade; 117th Infantry Regiment; 118th Infantry Regiment; 113th Machine Gun Battalion; 60th Infantry Brigade; 119th Infantry Regiment; 120th Infantry Regiment; 114th Machine Gun Battalion; 55th Field Artillery Brigade; 113th Field Artillery Regiment; 114th Field Artillery Regiment; 115th Field Artillery Regiment; 105th Trench Mortar Battery
35th Infantry Division	Major General Peter E. Traub	69th Infantry Brigade; 137th Infantry Regiment; 138th Infantry Regiment; 129th Machine Gun Battalion; 70th Infantry Brigade; 139th Infantry Regiment; 140th Infantry Regiment; 130th Machine Gun Battalion; 60th Field Artillery Brigade; 128th Field Artillery Regiment; 129th Field Artillery Regiment; 130th Field Artillery Regiment; 110th Trench Mortar Battalion
77th Infantry Division	Major General George B. Duncan	153rd Infantry Brigade; 305th Infantry Regiment; 306th Infantry Regiment; 305th Machine Gun Battalion; 154th Infantry Brigade; 307th Infantry Regiment; 308th Infantry Regiment; 306th Machine Gun Battalion; 152nd Field Artillery Brigade; 304th Field Artillery Regiment; 305th Field Artillery Regiment; 306th Field Artillery Regiment; 302nd Trench Mortar Battery
82nd Infantry Division	Major General William P. Burnham	163rd Infantry Brigade; 325th Infantry Regiment; 326th Infantry Regiment; 319th Machine Gun Battalion; 164th Infantry Brigade; 327th Infantry Regiment; 328th Infantry Regiment; 320th Machine Gun Battalion; 157th Field Artillery Brigade; 319th Field Artillery Regiment; 320th Field Artillery Regiment; 321st Field Artillery Regiment; 307th Trench Mortar Battery
Sources: Unless otherwise cited, the source is Gibbons, Floyd Phillips (2014) [1918]. And They Thought We Wouldn't Fight. Chicago: The Lakeside Press. OCLC 897378714.

== III Corps ==
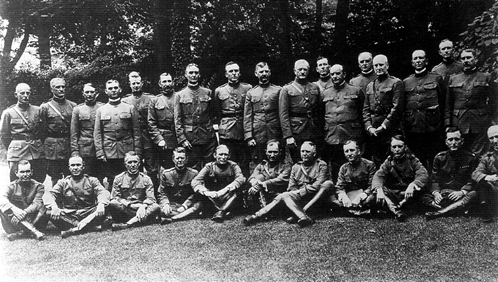
Officers of the American Expeditionary Forces and the Baker Mission, a fact-finding team sent to the Western Front prior to the commitment of US troops to study British and French warfighting techniques.

III Corps was first organized on 16 May 1918 in Mussy-Ser-Seine, France. It was the third of four newly activated corps of the American Expeditionary Forces, which at that time numbered over 1,000,000 men across 23 divisions. The corps took command of US forces training with the French Seventh Army at the same time that IV Corps took command of US forces training with the French Eighth Army.

It served during the Third Battle of the Aisne, the Aisne-Oise Offensive, the Aisne-Marne offensive, the Meuse–Argonne Offensive, and undertook a short time in the defensive sectors of Lorraine and Champagne. It then marched into Germany from 17 November 1918 to 2 July 1919. It was officially demobilized on 1 July 1919.

III Corps (structure as of Vesle operations)(7 to 17 August 1918) Lieutenant General William M. Wright
Name	Commander	Units
3rd Infantry Division	Major General Joseph T. Dickman	5th Infantry Brigade; 4th Infantry Regiment; 7th Infantry Regiment; 8th Machine Gun Battalion; 8th Infantry Brigade; 30th Infantry Regiment; 38th Infantry Regiment; 9th Machine Gun Battalion; 3rd Field Artillery Brigade; 10th Field Artillery Regiment; 18th Field Artillery Regiment; 76th Field Artillery Regiment; 3rd Trench Mortar Battery
5th Infantry Division	Major General John E. McMahon	9th Infantry Brigade; 60th Infantry Regiment; 61st Infantry Regiment; 14th Machine Gun Battalion; 10th Infantry Brigade; 6th Infantry Regiment; 11th Infantry Regiment; 15th Machine Gun Battalion; 5th Field Artillery Brigade; 19th Field Artillery Regiment; 20th Field Artillery Regiment; 21st Field Artillery Regiment
4th Infantry Division	Major General George H. Cameron	7th Infantry Brigade; 39th Infantry Regiment; 47th Infantry Regiment; 11th Machine Gun Battalion; 8th Infantry Brigade; 58th Infantry Regiment; 59th Infantry Regiment; 12th Machine Gun Battalion; 4th Field Artillery Brigade; 13th Field Artillery Regiment; 16th Field Artillery Regiment; 77th Field Artillery Regiment
33rd Infantry Division	Major General George Bell, Jr.	65th Infantry Brigade; 129th Infantry Regiment; 130th Infantry Regiment; 123rd Machine Gun Battalion; 66th Infantry Brigade; 131st Infantry Regiment; 132nd Infantry Regiment; 124th Machine Gun Battalion; 58th Field Artillery Brigade; 122nd Field Artillery Regiment; 123rd Field Artillery Regiment; 124th Field Artillery Regiment; 108th Trench Mortar Battery
78th Infantry Division	Major General James A. McRae	155th Infantry Brigade; 309th Infantry Regiment; 310th Infantry Regiment; 308th Machine Gun Battalion; 156th Infantry Brigade; 311th Infantry Regiment; 312th Infantry Regiment; 309th Machine Gun Battalion; 153rd Field Artillery Brigade; 307th Field Artillery Regiment; 308th Field Artillery Regiment; 309th Field Artillery Regiment; 303rd Trench Mortar Battery
80th Infantry Division	Major General Adelbert Cronkhite	159th Infantry Brigade; 317th Infantry Regiment; 318th Infantry Regiment; 313th Machine Gun Battalion; 160th Infantry Division; 319th Infantry Regiment; 320th Infantry Regiment; 315th Machine Gun Battalion; 155th Field Artillery Brigade; 313th Field Artillery Regiment; 314th Field Artillery Regiment; 315th Field Artillery Regiment; 305th Trench Mortar Battery
Sources: Unless otherwise cited, the source is Gibbons, Floyd Phillips (2014) [1918]. And They Thought We Wouldn't Fight. Chicago: The Lakeside Press. OCLC 897378714.

== IV Corps ==
IV Corps was first organized on 10 June 1918, during World War I as part of American Expeditionary Forces at Western Front, as Headquarters IV Army Corps, with its headquarters located in Neufchateau, France, which also was the headquarters of I Corps. Later, on 21 June, IV Corps was ordered to replace I Corps in the French VIII Corps area.

It participated in the Battle of Saint-Mihiel and in the defensive sector in Lorraine from 20 August 1918 to 11 September 1918. It moved into Germany from 17 November to 17 December 1918, before being demobilized in the Weimar Republic on 11 May 1919.

IV Corps (structure as of the period from 17 September 1918 to 11 November 1918) Lieutenant General George Windle Read
Name	Commander	Units
29th Infantry Division	Major General Charles G. Morton	57th Infantry Brigade; 113th Infantry Regiment; 114th Infantry Regiment; 111th Machine Gun Battalion; 58th Infantry Brigade; 115th Infantry Regiment; 116th Infantry Regiment; 112th Machine Gun Battalion; 54th Field Artillery Brigade; 110th Field Artillery Regiment; 111th Field Artillery Regiment; 112th Field Artillery Regiment; 104th Trench Mortar Battery
37th Infantry Division	Major General Charles S. Farnsworth	73rd Infantry Brigade; 145th Infantry Regiment; 146th Infantry Regiment; 135th Machine Gun Battalion; 74th Infantry Brigade; 147th Infantry Regiment; 148th Infantry Regiment; 136th Machine Gun Battalion; 62nd Field Artillery Brigade; 134th Field Artillery Regiment; 135th Field Artillery Regiment; 136th Field Artillery Regiment; 112th Trench Mortar Battery
83rd Infantry Division	Major General Edwin F. Glenn	165th Infantry Brigade; 329th Infantry Regiment; 330th Infantry Regiment; 323rd Machine Gun Battalion; 166th Infantry Brigade; 331st Infantry Regiment; 332nd Infantry Regiment; 324th Machine Gun Battalion; 158th Field Artillery Brigade; 322nd Field Artillery Regiment; 323rd Field Artillery Regiment; 324th Field Artillery Regiment; 308th Trench Mortar Battery
89th Infantry Division	Major General Frank L. Winn	177th Infantry Brigade; 353rd Infantry Regiment; 354th Infantry Regiment; 340th Machine Gun Battalion; 178th Infantry Brigade; 355th Infantry Regiment; 356th Infantry Regiment; 341st Machine Gun Battalion; 164th Field Artillery Brigade; 339th Field Artillery Regiment; 340th Field Artillery Regiment; 341st Field Artillery Regiment; 313th Trench Mortar Battery
90th Infantry Division	Major General Henry T. Allen	179th Infantry Brigade; 357th Infantry Regiment; 358th Infantry Regiment; 342nd Machine Gun Battalion; 180th Infantry Brigade; 359th Infantry Regiment; 360th Infantry Regiment; 343rd Machine Gun Battalion; 165th Field Artillery Brigade; 342nd Field Artillery Regiment; 343rd Field Artillery Regiment; 344th Field Artillery Regiment; 314th Trench Mortar Battery
92nd Infantry Division	Major General Charles C. Ballou	183rd Infantry Brigade; 365th Infantry Regiment; 366th Infantry Regiment; 350th Machine Gun Battalion; 184th Infantry Brigade; 367th Infantry Regiment; 368th Infantry Regiment; 351st Machine Gun Battalion; 167th Field Artillery Brigade; 350th Field Artillery Regiment; 351st Field Artillery Regiment; 352nd Field Artillery Regiment; 317th Trench Mortar Battery
Sources: Unless otherwise cited, the source is Gibbons, Floyd Phillips (2014) [1918]. And They Thought We Wouldn't Fight. Chicago: The Lakeside Press. OCLC 897378714.

== V Corps ==
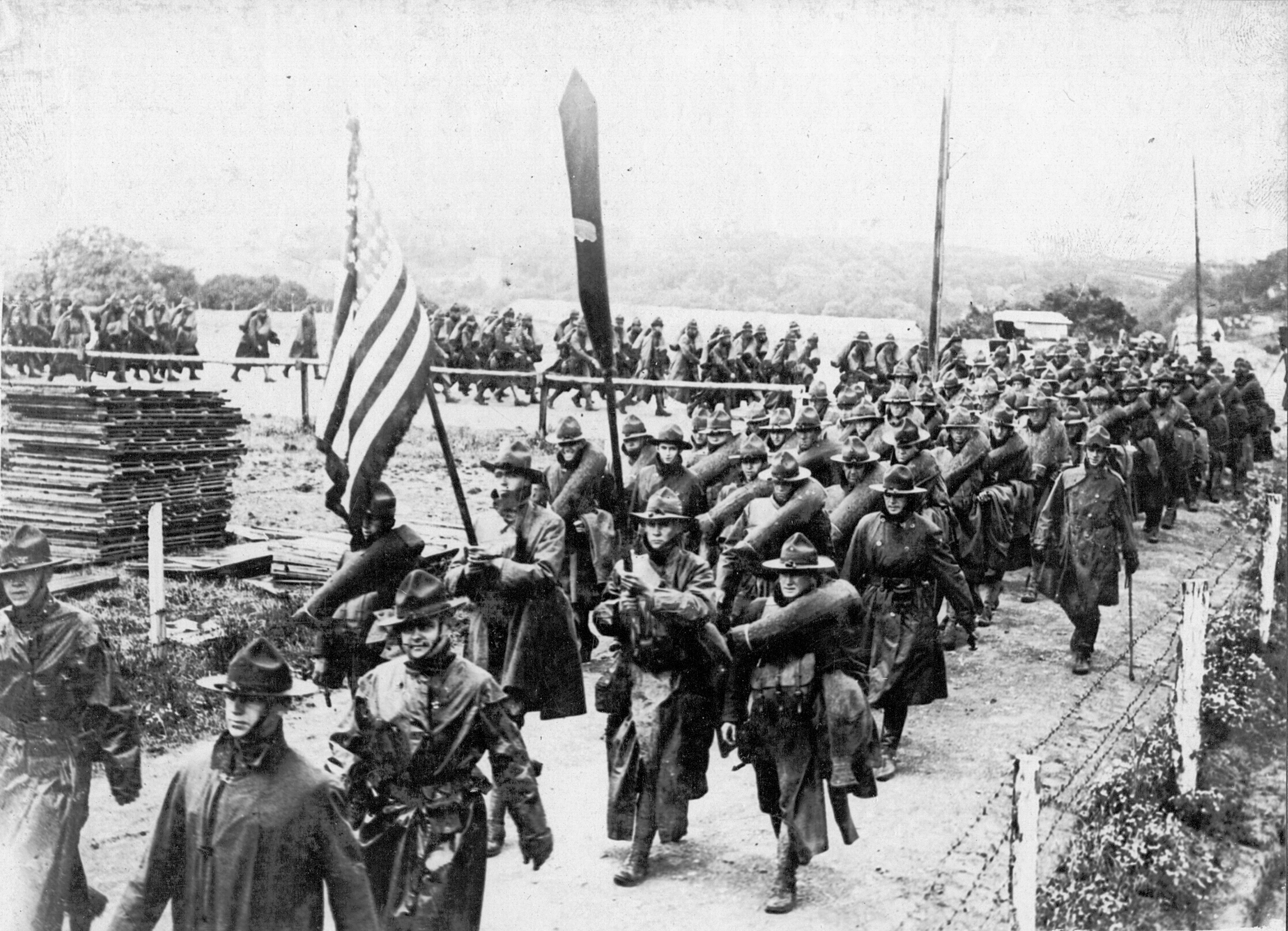
The American Expeditionary Forces marching in France.

V Corps was organized over the period 7–12 July 1918 in France as a Regular Army formation within the American Expeditionary Forces. By the end of World War I, the corps had fought in three named campaigns: the Battle of Saint-Mihiel, the Meuse–Argonne Offensive, and the Lorraine Campaign.

Activated and organized by Lieutenant General William M. Wright under orders by Pershing, its headquarters was formed in Remiremont, France. It was assigned to the First Army when it was created on 15 August 1918. It held command of the French 15th Colonial Infantry Division for a short period of time in 1918. It was later demobilized on 2 May 1919 in Camp Funston, Kansas.

V Corps (structure as of the Battle of Saint-Mihiel)(29 August to 16 September 1918) Lieutenant General William M. Wright
Name	Commander	Units
6th Infantry Division	Major General James B. Erwin	11th Infantry Brigade; 51st Infantry Regiment; 52nd Infantry Regiment; 17th Machine Gun Battalion; 12th Infantry Brigade; 53rd Infantry Regiment; 54th Infantry Regiment; 18th Machine Gun Battalion; 6th Field Artillery Brigade; 3rd Field Artillery Regiment; 11th Field Artillery Regiment; 76th Field Artillery Regiment; 6th Trench Mortar Battery
36th Infantry Division	Major General William R. Smith	71st Infantry Brigade; 141st Infantry Regiment; 142nd Infantry Regiment; 132nd Machine Gun Battalion; 72nd Infantry Brigade; 143rd Infantry Regiment; 144th Infantry Regiment; 133rd Infantry Regiment; 61st Field Artillery Brigade; 131st Field Artillery Regiment; 132nd Field Artillery Regiment; 133rd Field Artillery Regiment; 111th Trench Mortar Battery
76th Infantry Division	Major General Harry F. Hodges	151st Infantry Brigade; 301st Infantry Regiment; 302nd Infantry Regiment; 302nd Machine Gun Battalion; 152nd Infantry Brigade; 303rd Infantry Regiment; 304th Infantry Regiment; 303rd Machine Gun Battalion; 151st Field Artillery Brigade; 301st Field Artillery Regiment; 302nd Field Artillery Regiment; 303rd Field Artillery Regiment; 301st Trench Mortar Battery
79th Infantry Division	Major General Joseph E. Kuhn	157th Infantry Brigade; 313th Infantry Regiment; 314th Infantry Regiment; 308th Machine Gun Battalion; 158th Infantry Brigade; 315th Infantry Regiment; 316th Infantry Regiment; 309th Machine Gun Battalion; 154th Field Artillery Brigade; 301st Field Artillery Regiment; 302nd Field Artillery Regiment; 303rd Field Artillery Regiment; 304th Infantry Regiment
85th Infantry Division	Major General C. W. Kennedy	169th Infantry Brigade; 337th Infantry Regiment; 338th Infantry Regiment; 329th Machine Gun Battalion; 170th Infantry Brigade; 339th Infantry Regiment; 340th Infantry Regiment; 330th Infantry Regiment; 160th Field Artillery Brigade; 328th Field Artillery Regiment; 329th Field Artillery Regiment; 330th Field Artillery Regiment; 310th Trench Mortar Battery
91st Infantry Division	Major General Frederick S. Foltz	181st Infantry Brigade; 361st Infantry Regiment; 362nd Infantry Regiment; 348th Machine Gun Battalion; 182nd Infantry Brigade; 363rd Infantry Regiment; 364th Infantry Regiment; 349th Machine Gun Battalion; 166th Field Artillery Brigade; 347th Field Artillery Regiment; 348th Field Artillery Regiment; 349th Field Artillery Regiment; 316th Trench Mortar Battery
Sources: Unless otherwise cited, the source is Gibbons, Floyd Phillips (2014) [1918]. And They Thought We Wouldn't Fight. Chicago: The Lakeside Press. OCLC 897378714.

== VI Corps ==
VI Corps was activated and organized by Omar Bundy on 26 July 1918. Charles C. Ballou, Charles T. Menoher, and George Bell Jr. all assumed command at some time before the armistice. VI Corps served with the First United States Army in the Battle of Saint-Mihiel and the Meuse–Argonne Offensive. VI Corps was then stationed in Belgium and Luxemburg from 19 December 1918 to 11 April 1919, when it was finally demobilized.

VI Corps (structure as of the Lorraine Offensive) (23 October to 13 November 1918) Lieutenant General Charles T. Menoher
Name	Commander	Units
7th Infantry Division	Major General Charles H. Barth	13th Infantry Brigade; 55th Infantry Regiment; 56th Infantry Regiment; 20th Machine Gun Battalion; 14th Infantry Brigade; 34th Infantry Regiment; 64th Infantry Regiment; 21st Machine Gun Battalion; 7th Field Artillery Brigade; 8th Field Artillery Regiment; 79th Field Artillery Regiment; 80th Field Artillery Regiment; 7th Trench Mortar Battery
88th Infantry Division	Major General Edward H. Plummer	175th Infantry Brigade; 349th Infantry Regiment; 350th Infantry Regiment; 338th Machine Gun Battalion; 176th Infantry Brigade; 351st Infantry Regiment; 352nd Infantry Regiment; 339th Machine Gun Battalion; 163rd Field Artillery Brigade; 337th Field Artillery Regiment; 338th Field Artillery Regiment; 339th Field Artillery Regiment; 313th Trench Mortar Battery
92nd Infantry Division	Major General Charles C. Ballou	183rd Infantry Brigade; 365th Infantry Regiment; 366th Infantry Regiment; 350th Machine Gun Battalion; 184th Infantry Brigade; 367th Infantry Regiment; 368th Infantry Regiment; 351st Machine Gun Battalion; 167th Field Artillery Brigade; 350th Field Artillery Regiment; 351st Field Artillery Regiment; 352nd Field Artillery Regiment; 317th Trench Mortar Battery

== VII Corps ==
On 16 August 1918, Major General William M. Wright was designated as VII Corps' temporary commander. Three days later, the formation was designated an administrative organization and tasked with commanding training efforts in the French XXXIII Corps and the French XL Corps areas, relieving V Corps of the command. It saw no combat action in World War I. It marched into Germany from 22 November to 12 December 1918. It was finally demobilized on 11 May 1919, with its remnants becoming part of the Third Army.

VII Corps (structure as of the period from 19 to 27 August 1918) Major General William M. Wright
Name	Commander	Units
5th Infantry Division	Major General John E. McMahon	9th Infantry Brigade; 60th Infantry Regiment; 61st Infantry Regiment; 14th Machine Gun Battalion; 10th Infantry Brigade; 6th Infantry Regiment; 10th Infantry Regiment; 15th Machine Gun Battalion; 5th Field Artillery Brigade; 19th Field Artillery Regiment; 20th Field Artillery Regiment; 21st Field Artillery Regiment
29th Infantry Division	Major General Charles G. Morton	57th Infantry Brigade; 113th Infantry Regiment; 114th Infantry Regiment; 111th Machine Gun Battalion; 58th Infantry Brigade; 115th Infantry Regiment; 116th Infantry Regiment; 112th Machine Gun Battalion; 54th Field Artillery Brigade; 110th Field Artillery Regiment; 111th Field Artillery Regiment; 112th Field Artillery Regiment; 104th Trench Mortar Battery
35th Infantry Division	Major General Peter E. Traub	69th Infantry Brigade; 137th Infantry Regiment; 138th Infantry Regiment; 129th Machine Gun Battalion; 70th Infantry Brigade; 139th Infantry Regiment; 140th Infantry Regiment; 130th Machine Gun Battalion; 60th Field Artillery Brigade; 128th Field Artillery Regiment; 129th Field Artillery Regiment; 130th Field Artillery Regiment; 110th Trench Mortar Battalion
92nd Infantry Division	Major General Charles C. Ballou	183rd Infantry Brigade; 365th Infantry Regiment; 366th Infantry Regiment; 350th Machine Gun Battalion; 184th Infantry Brigade; 367th Infantry Regiment; 368th Infantry Regiment; 351st Machine Gun Battalion; 167th Field Artillery Brigade; 350th Field Artillery Regiment; 351st Field Artillery Regiment; 352nd Field Artillery Regiment; 317th Trench Mortar Battery
Sources: Unless otherwise cited, the source is Army War College Historical Section (1988a) [1931]. The American Expeditionary Forces: General Headquarters, Armies, Army Corps, Services of Supply, Separate Forces (PDF). Order of Battle of the United States Land Forces in the World War. Vol. I. CMH Pub 23-1. Washington, D.C.: United States Army Center of Military History. OCLC 183412729. Archived from the original (PDF) on 13 February 2015.

== VIII Corps ==
Activated and organized by Major General Henry T. Allen on 18 November 1918, VIII Corps was ordered to train and supervise troops of the First Army that were withdrawing from the Meuse-Argonne theater to American training areas in France. It saw no combat during World War I, as it was formed after the Armistice. It was demobilized on 20 April 1919.

VIII Corps (structure as of the period from 26 to 30 November 1918) Major General Henry T. Allen
Name	Commander	Units
6th Infantry Division	Major General Walter H. Gordon	11th Infantry Brigade; 51st Infantry Regiment; 52nd Infantry Regiment; 17th Machine Gun Battalion; 12th Infantry Brigade; 53rd Infantry Regiment; 54th Infantry Regiment; 18th Machine Gun Battalion; 6th Field Artillery Brigade; 3rd Field Artillery Regiment; 11th Field Artillery Regiment; 76th Field Artillery Regiment; 6th Trench Mortar Battery
77th Infantry Division	Major General Robert Alexander	153rd Infantry Brigade; 305th Infantry Regiment; 306th Infantry Regiment; 305th Machine Gun Battalion; 154th Infantry Brigade; 307th Infantry Regiment; 308th Infantry Regiment; 306th Machine Gun Battalion; 152nd Field Artillery Brigade; 304th Field Artillery Regiment; 305th Field Artillery Regiment; 306th Field Artillery Regiment; 302nd Trench Mortar Battery
81st Infantry Division	Major General Charles J. Bailey	161st Infantry Brigade; 321st Infantry Regiment; 322nd Infantry Regiment; 317th Machine Gun Battalion; 162nd Infantry Brigade; 323rd Infantry Regiment; 324th Infantry Regiment; 318th Machine Gun Regiment; 156th Field Artillery Brigade; 316th Field Artillery Regiment; 317th Field Artillery Regiment; 318th Field Artillery Regiment; 306th Trench Mortar Battery
Sources: Unless otherwise cited, the source is Army War College Historical Section (1988a) [1931]. The American Expeditionary Forces: General Headquarters, Armies, Army Corps, Services of Supply, Separate Forces (PDF). Order of Battle of the United States Land Forces in the World War. Vol. I. CMH Pub 23-1. Washington, D.C.: United States Army Center of Military History. OCLC 183412729. Archived from the original (PDF) on 13 February 2015.

== IX Corps ==
IX Corps was organized and activated by Brigadier General William K. Naylor on 16 November 1918, although Major General Adelbert Cronkhite assumed command on 18 November, after which Naylor became his chief of staff. It constituted the left flank of the Second Army on the front between Jonville and Fresnes-en-Woevre. It supervised the activities of formations (such as police duties), due to the armistice, when it was in the area. It was finally demobilized on 5 May 1919.

IX Corps (structure as of the period from 26 November to 5 December) Major General Adelbert Cronkhite
Name	Commander	Units
33rd Infantry Division	Major General Henry D. Todd Jr.; Major General George Bell Jr.	65th Infantry Brigade; 129th Infantry Regiment; 130th Infantry Regiment; 123rd Machine Gun Battalion; 66th Infantry Brigade; 131st Infantry Regiment; 132nd Infantry Regiment; 124th Machine Gun Battalion; 58th Field Artillery Brigade; 122nd Field Artillery Regiment; 123rd Field Artillery Regiment; 124th Field Artillery Regiment; 108th Trench Mortar Battery
35th Infantry Division	Major General Thomas B. Dugan; Major General Peter E. Traub	69th Infantry Brigade; 137th Infantry Regiment; 138th Infantry Regiment; 129th Machine Gun Battalion; 70th Infantry Brigade; 139th Infantry Regiment; 140th Infantry Regiment; 130th Machine Gun Battalion; 60th Field Artillery Brigade; 128th Field Artillery Regiment; 129th Field Artillery Regiment; 130th Field Artillery Regiment; 110th Trench Mortar Battery
Sources: Unless otherwise cited, the source is Army War College Historical Section (1988a) [1931]. The American Expeditionary Forces: General Headquarters, Armies, Army Corps, Services of Supply, Separate Forces (PDF). Order of Battle of the United States Land Forces in the World War. Vol. I. CMH Pub 23-1. Washington, D.C.: United States Army Center of Military History. OCLC 183412729. Archived from the original (PDF) on 13 February 2015.

== Unassigned divisions ==
These divisions were unassigned to any corps in the AEF during World War I at the time of the Armistice.

Unassigned divisions
Name	Commander	Units
81st Infantry Division	Major General Charles J. Bailey	161st Infantry Brigade; 321st Infantry Regiment; 322nd Infantry Regiment; 317th Machine Gun Battalion; 162nd Infantry Brigade; 323rd Infantry Regiment; 324th Infantry Regiment; 318th Machine Gun Battalion; 156th Field Artillery Brigade; 316th Field Artillery Regiment; 317th Field Artillery Regiment; 318th Field Artillery Regiment; 306th Trench Mortar Battery
93rd Infantry Division	Major General Roy Hoffman	185th Infantry Brigade; 369th Infantry Regiment; 370th Infantry Regiment; 352nd Infantry Regiment; 186th Infantry Brigade; 371st Infantry Regiment; 372nd Infantry Regiment; 353rd Machine Gun Battalion; 165th Field Artillery Brigade; 353rd Field Artillery Regiment; 354th Field Artillery Regiment; 355th Field Artillery Regiment; 318th Trench Mortar Battery
39th Infantry Division	Major General Henry C. Hodges Jr.	77th Infantry Brigade; 153rd Infantry Regiment; 154th Infantry Regiment; 141st Machine Gun Battalion; 78th Infantry Brigade; 155th Infantry Regiment; 156th Infantry Regiment; 142nd Machine Gun Battalion; 64th Field Artillery Brigade; 140th Field Artillery Regiment; 141st Field Artillery Regiment; 142nd Field Artillery Regiment; 114th Trench Mortar Battery
Sources: Unless otherwise cited, the source is Gibbons, Floyd Phillips (2014) [1918]. And They Thought We Wouldn't Fight. Chicago: The Lakeside Press. OCLC 897378714.

== See also ==
- American Expeditionary Force Siberia
- American Expeditionary Force North Russia
