= Raimondi Park =

Ballpark in Oakland, California, US

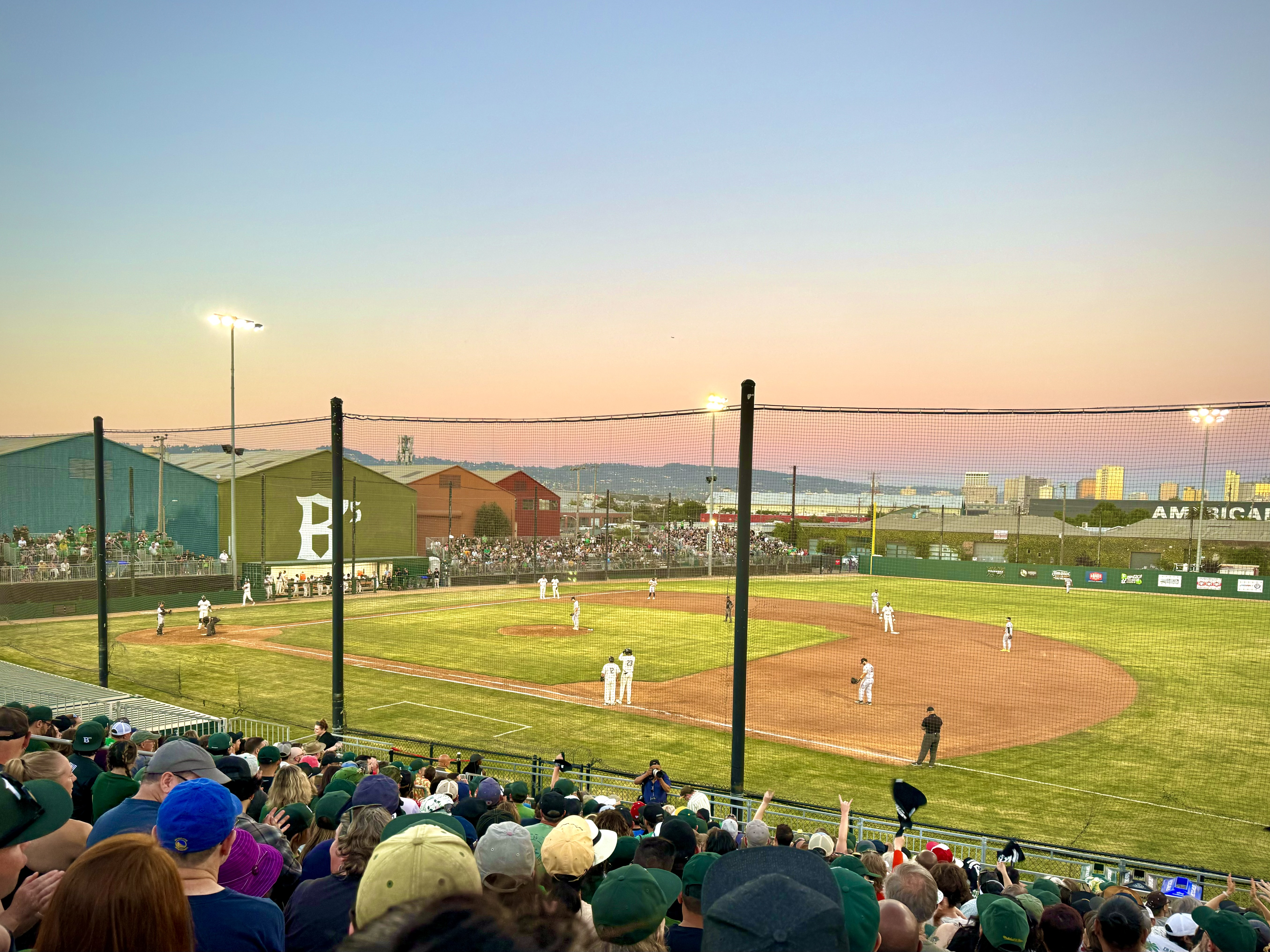
- Raimondi Park during the inaugural Oakland Ballers home game
- Interactive map of Raimondi Park
- Full name: Ernie Raimondi Park
- Former names: West Oakland Park; Bay View Park
- Address: 1800 Wood St; Oakland, California; United States
- Coordinates: 37°48′58″N 122°17′38″W
- Owner: City of Oakland
- Capacity: 4,000
- Acreage: 10 acres (4.0 ha)
- Public transit: AC Transit: 22, NL; BART: at West Oakland

Construction
- Opened: 1890s
- Expanded: 2024

Tenant
- Oakland Ballers (Pioneer League) 2024–present

Raimondi Park is a 4,000-seat ballpark and public park in the West Oakland neighborhood of Oakland, California. It is the home field of the Oakland Ballers of the independent Pioneer League, and is closely connected to the history of baseball in Oakland. Formerly known as West Oakland Park and Bay View Park, the park was renamed in 1947 to honor Pacific Coast League third baseman and United States Army infantryman Ernie Raimondi, who was killed in action during World War II.

The city of Oakland acquired the land for the park in the 1890s, and it has served a variety of functions since. The park has been a venue for formal and informal baseball since the early 20th century, and has played a significant role in the history of baseball in Oakland. In addition to its baseball facilities, the park functions as a neighborhood public park, with soccer fields and a playground. The park's current configuration is the result of a $1.6 million privately funded improvement program organized by the Oakland Ballers, which was completed in time for the team's inaugural season in 2024.

== History ==
=== Construction ===
A park for the West Oakland neighborhood was proposed as early as the 1880s. The Oakland City Council discussed the concept of a West Oakland Park in 1896, to be located on a marsh owned by the Southern Pacific Railroad. Dredging to construct the park began shortly after the land was acquired in 1897, and improvements to the park continued through the early 20th century. A large rainstorm in 1903 covered the park in several feet of water.

In the immediate aftermath of the April 1906 San Francisco earthquake, the city of Oakland announced that it would allow San Francisco manufacturers to construct temporary factory and warehouse facilities on the site of West Oakland Park. The city council reversed the decision in May after backlash from park users and West Oakland businesses.

=== Baseball era ===
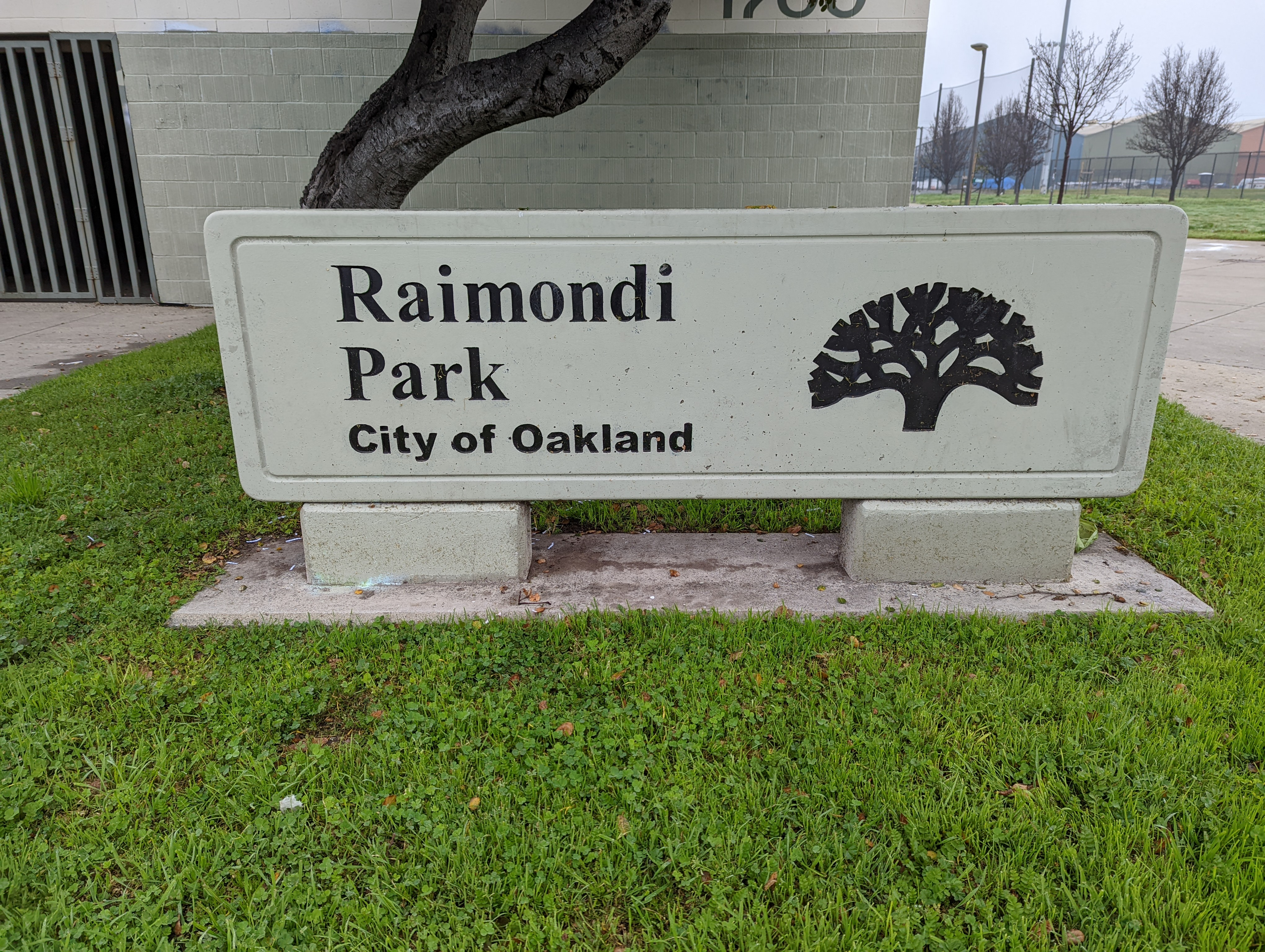
The Raimondi Park sign in 2022

The park was renamed Bay View Park in 1910, and an improvement program began to provide permanent facilities at the park. Organized and unorganized games of baseball have been played at the park since the early 20th century, and a 2016 retrospective in the East Bay Times argued that the park "contributed more baseball stars than any park in the country." Catcher Ernie Lombardi played sandlot ball at the park as a teenager in the early 1920s, and pitcher Bill Wight recalled that he "used to haunt Bay View Park" in the 1930s. The park's future namesake Ernie Raimondi and his three brothers were regular visitors to the park in the 1930s and 1940s.

Bay View Park was the site of a temporary military post office during World War II, which operated for four months during the Christmas season, employing over 1,500 staff. The park was renamed Raimondi Park in 1947, honoring Ernie Raimondi.

In the 1990s, the park had a baseball diamond and two soccer fields, with approximately 300 to 400 daily visitors on weekends and 50 to 75 daily visitors on weekdays. In 2007, Raimondi Park was the third most-used park in Oakland, hosting youth soccer leagues from across the East Bay. The park also had frequent issues with drainage, causing the fields to be closed for three months of the year. A $5 million renovation program began in 2008, adding a putting green, new playground equipment, and artificial turf for the park's soccer fields.

=== Wood Street encampment ===
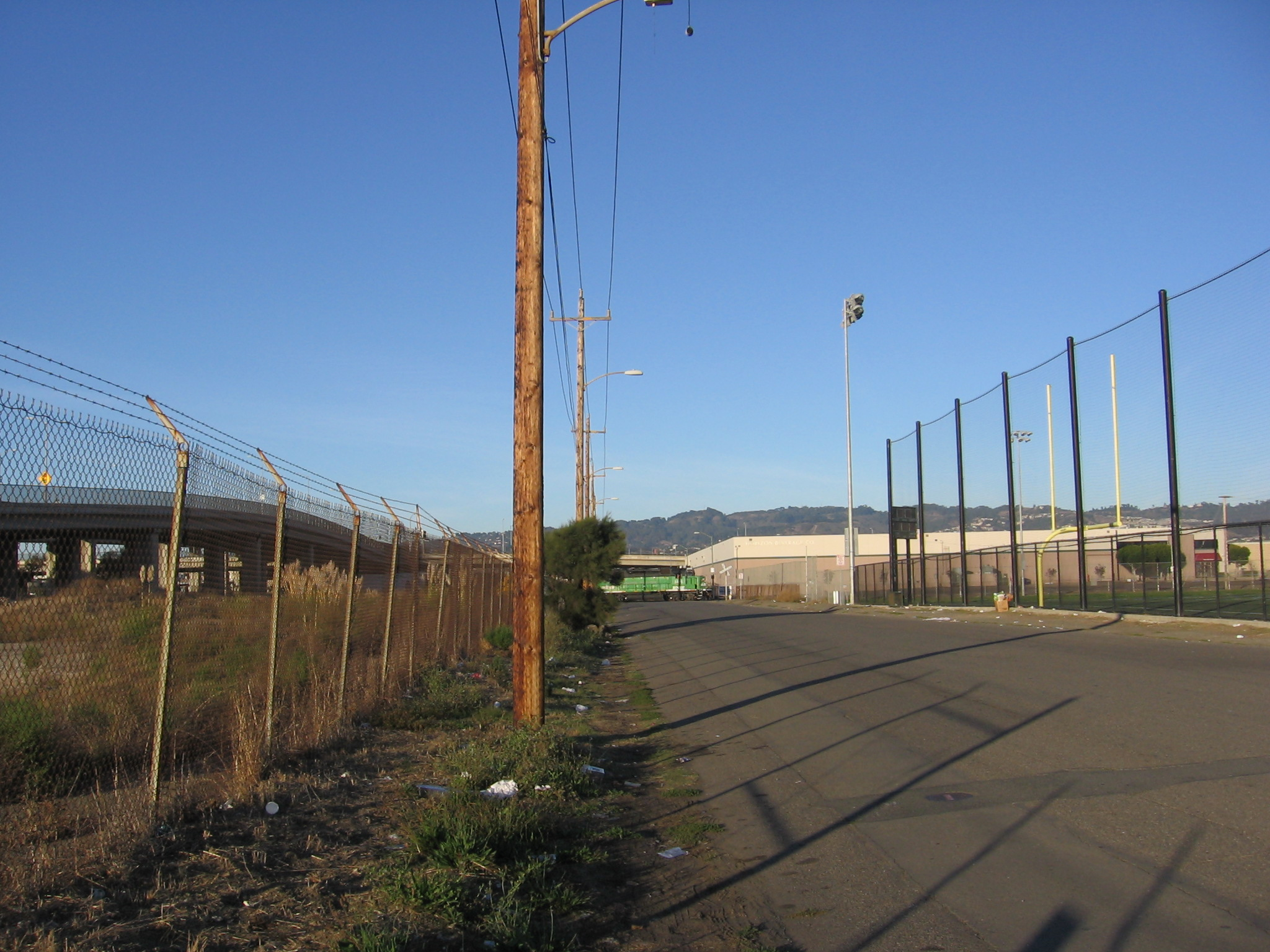
Raimondi Park (right) and the future site of the Wood Street Commons encampment (left), photographed in 2012

In the early 2020s, a parcel of land adjacent to Raimondi Park was in use as a large homeless encampment, part of the broader issue of homelessness in California. The Wood Street encampment was centered on the Wood Street Commons lot, a parcel of land owned by the city of Oakland immediately west of Raimondi Park.

The Wood Street Commons, bounded by its namesake Wood Street to the east, 20th Street to the north, the Interstate 880 freeway to the west, and the former 16th Street station to the south, began to be used as an encampment in 2019. A Historic American Buildings Survey record of the Wood Street Commons described it as existing within "a complex legal, architectural, and topographical landscape" which had occupied multiple city blocks in West Oakland since the early 2010s. The Wood Street Commons encampment was demolished by the city of Oakland in 2023.

=== Oakland Ballers ===
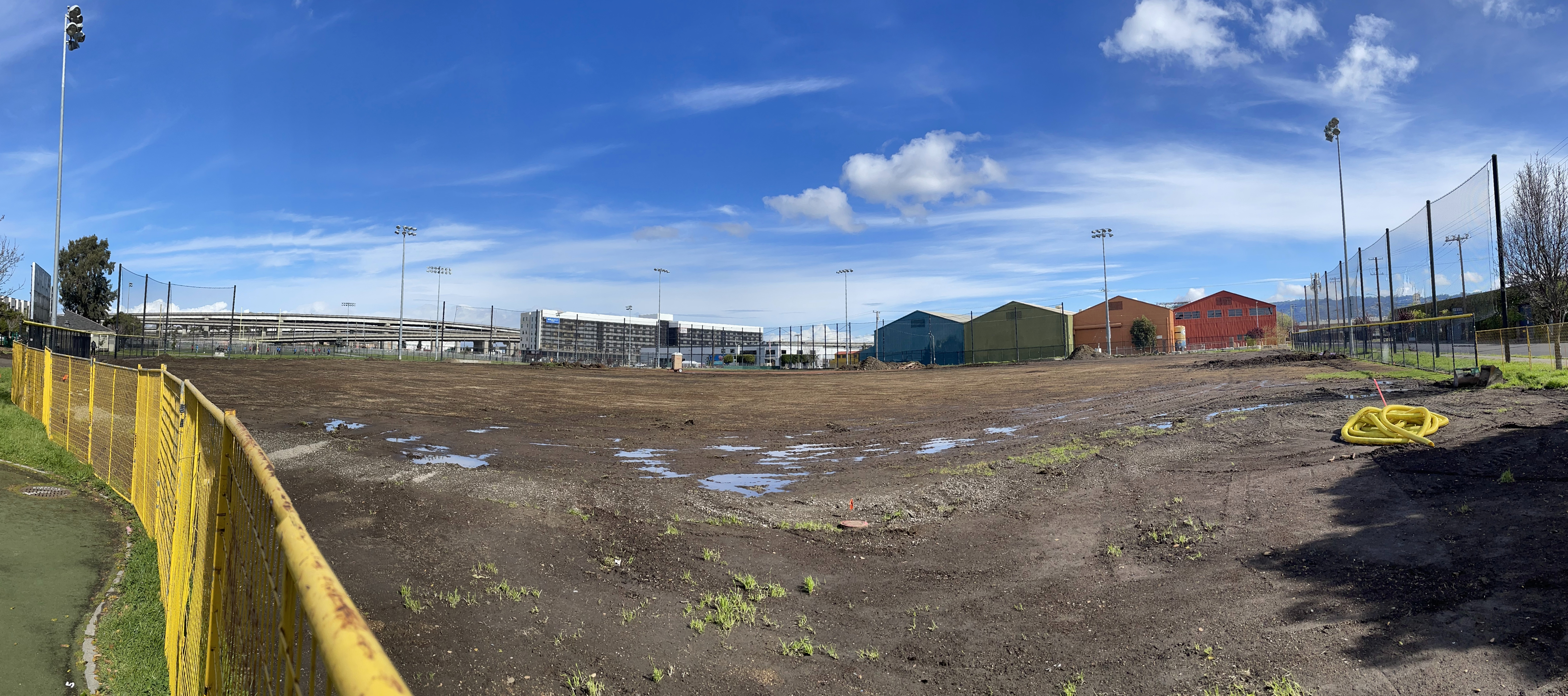
Renovations at the park in the spring of 2024

The Oakland Ballers, an expansion team in the independent Pioneer League, were founded in late 2023 in response to the Oakland Athletics relocation to Las Vegas. The Ballers initially planned to begin playing at Laney College in the summer of 2024, but their negotiations with school officials ended that February.

The Ballers selected Raimondi Park as their home soon afterwards, and reached a 1-year lease agreement with the city of Oakland in April. Under the agreement, the Ballers funded a $1.6 million improvements program to the baseball facilities in the park, including new bleachers, scoreboards, and locker rooms. As a condition of the agreement, the field remains open to the public outside of scheduled Ballers games. The renovations were completed in time for the Ballers' opening day on June 4, which sold out the 4,000-seat park.

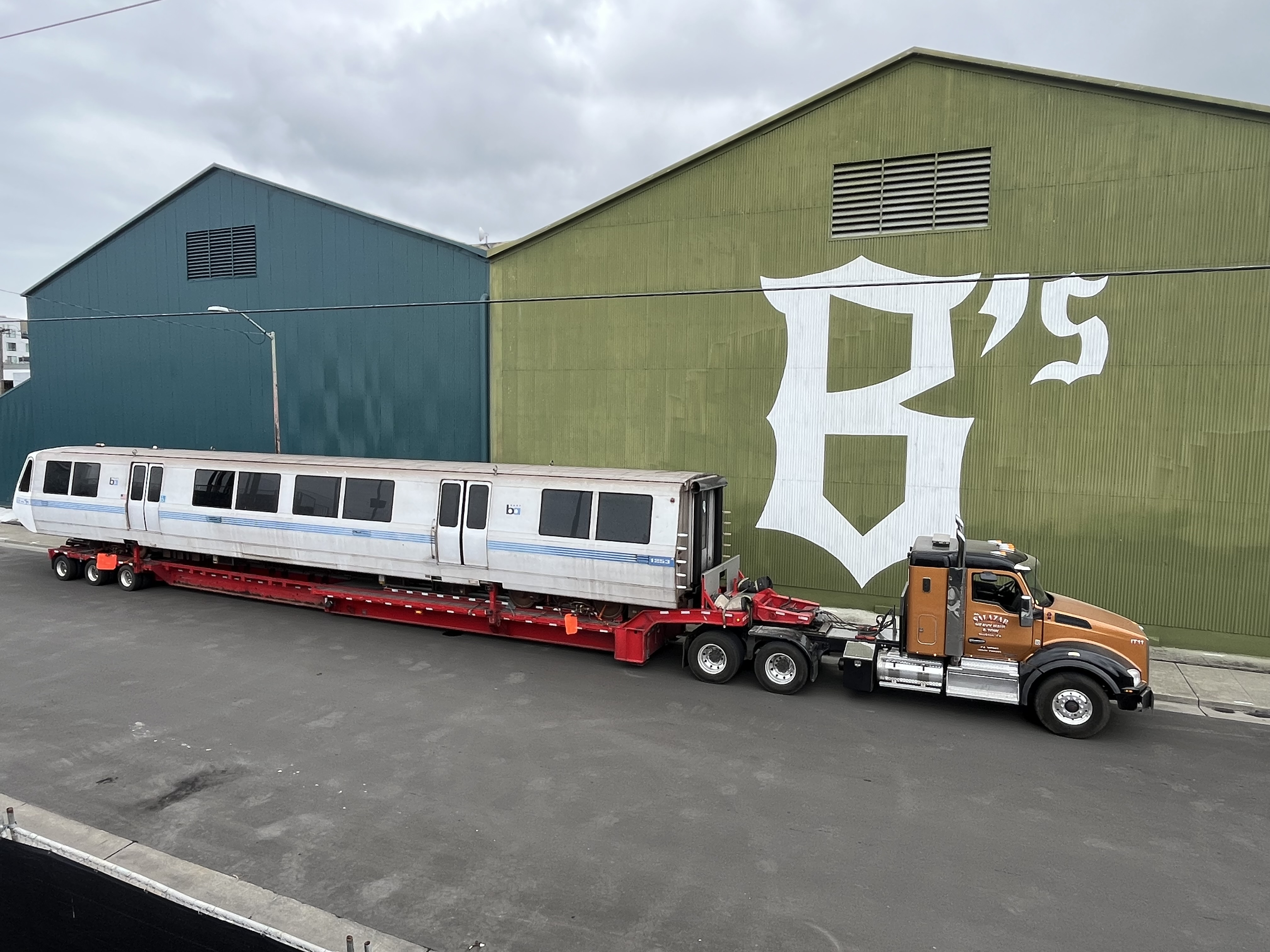
Delivery of the Ballers' BART car in April 2025

The Ballers signed a 10-year lease for the park in May 2025, ahead of their 2025 season. That spring, the Ballers announced that they would accept a retired legacy Bay Area Rapid Transit car, to be placed at Raimondi Park. The retired car was originally offered to the Athletics, who withdrew their application for the retired car after they relocated from Oakland. BART is headquartered in Oakland, and is a sponsor of the Ballers.

The car was delivered to the Ballers in April 2025, who plan to repurpose it as a park concession stand for the 2026 season. The Ballers also acquired multiple statues of Athletics mascot Stomper from local organizations, which are displayed in a section of the park nicknamed "Scrappy's Sanctuary for Lost Animals."

== Namesake ==
Ernie Raimondi
- Third base
- Born: Ernest Rinaldo Raimondi; June 15, 1919; Oakland, California, U.S.
- Died: January 26, 1945 (aged 25); Near Sarreguemines, France
- Batted: Right Threw: Right

Teams
- San Francisco Seals (1936, 1938–1940); Tacoma Tigers (1937–1938); Oakland Oaks (1940–1941); Oklahoma City Indians (1941)
Military career
Allegiance	United States
Branch	United States Army
Service years	1944–1945
Rank	Private
Unit	324th Infantry Regiment

Raimondi Park is named after Ernest Rinaldo "Ernie" Raimondi (June 15, 1919 – January 26, 1945), a Pacific Coast League baseball player from Oakland who was killed in action in World War II.

Raimondi was born in Oakland to John and Josephine Raimondi, and was part of a family of baseball players that included his brothers Billy, Al, and Walt. He attended McClymonds High School in Oakland, and was the captain of the McClymonds Warriors baseball team. The Warriors were the champions of the Oakland Athletic League in 1936, with Raimondi maintaining a batting average of .445.

Raimondi was signed by the San Francisco Seals in May 1936 at the age of 16, after attending a tryout with his older brother Billy and younger brother Al. His signing caused controversy due to his age; the Los Angeles Illustrated Daily News reported that "A new drive to keep scouts of organized professional baseball off school baseball lots appeared to be brewing." Raimondi played for the Seals in the summer of 1936 before being farmed out to the Tacoma Tigers of the Western International League.

Raimondi played for the Tacoma Tigers for one full season in 1937, batting .296 in 130 games. He played part of the 1938 season for the Tigers before re-signing with the Seals. With the Seals, he batted .271 in the 1939 season in 55 games, missing much of the season due to an appendectomy in July.

Raimondi was released by the Seals in early 1940, and he signed with the Oakland Oaks shortly afterwards. In the 1940 season, he played for the Oaks with his brother Billy; Walt and Al would also go on to play for the Oaks later in the 1940s. Raimondi married his childhood sweetheart Ellen Dowd in November 1940, and was released by the Oaks in May 1941. He signed with the Oklahoma City Indians of the Texas League, but returned to Oakland after 28 games. After giving up professional baseball, Raimondi worked for the Moore Dry Dock Company in Oakland, and played on its company baseball team.

Raimondi's only child, Penny, was born in April 1944. On April 19, the day of Penny's birth, Ernie received draft papers from the Army. He entered Army service in June, serving in the 324th Infantry Regiment of the 44th Infantry Division. His division landed in France in September, and Raimondi sustained fatal injuries in early January 1945 in Sarreguemines. Raimondi died on January 26, and was initially buried at the Epinal American Cemetery in France. His body was returned to Oakland in 1948.
