= Ronot society =

French foundry

Ronot Society, formerly known as Société de Chaudronnerie et de Construction Mécaniques de Saint-Dizier, was a French foundry established in 1905 by Ernest Ronot. It was legally renamed Société Ernest Ronot in 1918. The business used the name 'Ronot' from 1938 to 2014. The company began operating as a part of the foundry industry, focusing on industrial and agricultural boiler-making, and expanded its scope of activity over its lifespan. In 2008, Ronot was placed under judicial review and was closed by a judicial liquidation in 2014, leaving a total of 41 workers unemployed.

== History ==
=== Development ===
Ernest Ronot opened a foundry in 1905, named St. Dizier Boilermaking and Metallic Manufacturing Society (French: Société de chaudronnerie et de constructions mécaniques de Saint-Dizier). It was renamed Société Ernest Ronot in 1918 and finally renamed Ronot in 1938. From 1910 to 1923, Ronot constructed a modern factory and expanded it to cover 20,000 m^{2}. In 1926, he ordered the construction of a workers’ housing estate with access to a railway line.

In the 1960s, the company started to decline, along with other French industrial enterprises of the time. In December 1984, Ronot went through a court settlement due to the financial state of the company. In 1986, Ronot was bought by the Alsace-based boiler making company Bieber, which became the principal shareholder and continued to expand its activities. In the middle of 2006, Ronot obtained Samas de Vesoul, an Haute-Saône-based company specializing in the commercialization of farm dumpsters, trailers, and flatbeds. In 2007, Ronot acquired Société Brimont, another company manufacturing farm dumpsters in the French department of the Ardennes. Although this company was finally bought by Société Arden Verins in 2009, its acquisition marked the Europeanization of Ronot with the creation of its Polish branch.

=== Facilities ===
In 1921, Ernest Ronot bought land, borrowing from local enterprises, to expand the size of the boiler maker factory. In 1931, there were over 300 employees working in the factory. Ronot notably invested in a fleet of 150 machines to cut, fold, bend, stamp, drill, and weld steel. The jewel of this fleet was built in 1931 by Delattre and Frouard. A unique stamping press with a power of 2,000 tons was established in the factory and operated until 2014. In 2007, the factory of Ronot covered an area of 25,000 m^{2} and employed 80 workers and employees, up from 78 in 2006.

=== Leadership ===
Ernest Ronot was a French entrepreneur, born in 1879, in Chaumont. During the Second World War, Ronot fled to Nice as Chaumont was invaded. Even though his factory was requisitioned by the Germans, Ronot refused to return to Saint-Dizier to collaborate with the Nazis. He managed his company in Nice, assisted by his cousin Paul Ronot.

Ronot, the company's first CEO, died in 1943. His friend Émile Barthélémy succeeded him from 1943 until his death in 1961. Ernest's grandson, Hubert Varin, led the company from 1961 until his accidental death in 1985, after which his wife Marie-Louise Varin became the CEO. In 1986, the company was bought by Bieber Industry and its President Raymond Bieber became Ronot's CEO. Marie-Louise Varin remained General Director until she retired in 2002. José de Sousa was appointed by Bieber Industry to become the next Director-General until the judicial liquidation of the company.

== Catalogs and products ==
The company's motto was "We only deliver the irreproachable" (French: Nous ne livrons que l’irréprochable). The catalog of the company diversified its offerings throughout the years. Their flagship products were the “Niagara” pump, the “Idéal” barrel and the “Ève" washing machine. All were reputed to be durable and reliable. The catalog also included trays, cookers, drinking troughs for farm animals, laundry boilers, and geared pumps. In 2006, Ronot started the commercialization of aluminum products.

=== Communication and advertising ===
Early in the life of the company, Ernest Ronot engaged the work of famous publicists such as Georges Ripart, Racham, C. Thévenin, or Jan. The company created modern advertising campaigns which alternatively disparaged the products of competitors or displayed beautiful horses pulling their best products. Another campaign illustrated the life of working class people surrounded by innovative products, such as men with the company's steel barrels and women with Ronot washing machines. Ronot participated in the early Agricultural Fair of Paris (French: Salon International de l'agriculture). In 1950 and several years afterward, Ronot was one of the pillars of the Fair of Agricultural Machines (French: Salon de la Machine Agricole).

== Closure ==
Ronot ceased operations in 2014 through a judicial liquidation that followed several judicial reviews. The facility and its 150 machines were auctioned. Some machines were bought by local companies while others were salvaged by associations concerned with the survival of industrial heritage.

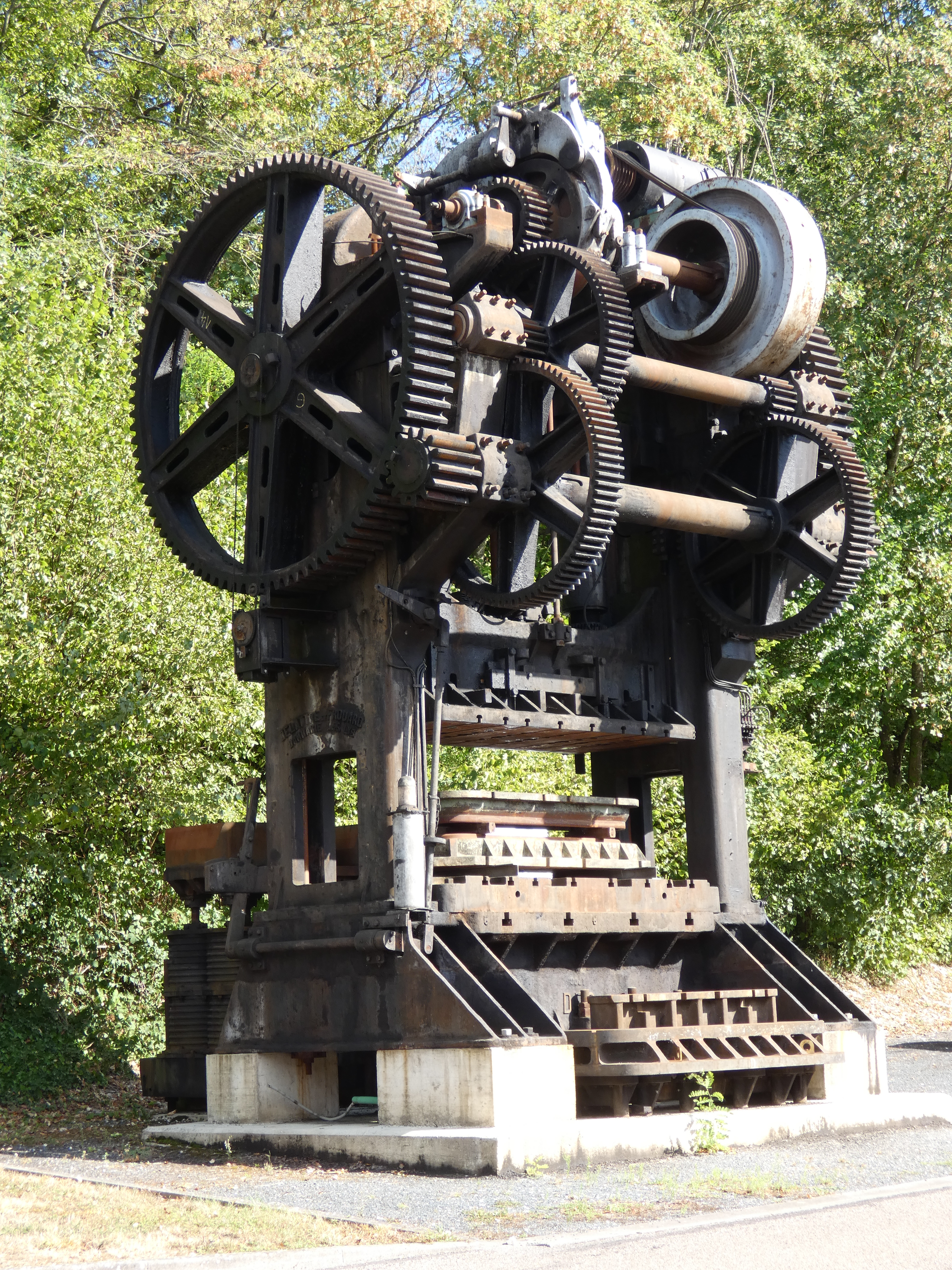
Ronot press, inaugurated in 1931, was saved in 2014 by the ASPM association.

The Association pour la Sauvegarde et la Promotion du Patrimoine Métallurgique haut-marnais raised funds to save a press; and dismantle, move, and reassemble it at a conservatory of machines in Dommartin-le-Franc.
