= Micah Franklin (baseball) =

American baseball player & coach (born 1972)

- Outfielder
- Born: April 25, 1972 (age 53); San Francisco, California, U.S.
- Batted: Switch Threw: Right

Professional debut
- MLB: May 13, 1997, for the St. Louis Cardinals
- NPB: April 3, 1999, for the Nippon Ham Fighters

Last appearance
- MLB: June 28, 1997, for the St. Louis Cardinals
- NPB: July 13, 2000, for the Hanshin Tigers

MLB statistics
- Batting average: .324
- Home runs: 2
- Runs batted in: 2

NPB statistics
- Batting average: .233
- Home runs: 32
- Runs batted in: 86

KBO statistics
- Batting average: .250
- Home runs: 24
- Runs batted in: 58
- Stats at Baseball Reference

Teams
- St. Louis Cardinals (1997); Nippon Ham Fighters (1999–2000); Hanshin Tigers (2000); Hyundai Unicorns (2002–2003)

Micah Ishanti Franklin (born April 25, 1972) is an American former professional baseball outfielder. He played part of one season in Major League Baseball with the St. Louis Cardinals in 1997. Franklin also played in Nippon Professional Baseball in Japan during the 1999 and 2000 seasons, and in the Korea Baseball Organization in 2002 and 2003.

== Early life ==
Franklin was born in San Francisco, California, attended Lincoln High School in San Francisco, and is Jewish. His mother is Jewish and his father was African-American.

== Career ==
Franklin was drafted by the New York Mets in the 3rd round of the 1990 amateur draft. Although he only appeared in 17 games at the major league level, Franklin compiled an extensive minor league baseball career, playing 1,141 games over 12 seasons. In the majors he batted .324/.378/.500.

While in the minors with the Triple-A Indianapolis Indians in 2001, Franklin was one of four players profiled in the documentary film A Player to Be Named Later. He spent time as a scout for the Arizona Diamondbacks.

=== Coaching ===
In 2015, Franklin was a Major League scout working for the Seattle Mariners.

On December 6, 2017, he was announced as the new hitting coach for the Arizona Diamondbacks Short Season A-Ball affiliate, Hillsboro Hops. A year later, he was promoted to the single-A Kane County Cougars in the same position.

In 2022, Franklin was hired as the hitting coach for the Washington Nationals AA affiliate, Harrisburg Senators.

He was appointed the first-ever manager of the Oakland Ballers of the Pioneer League in the autumn of 2023. On July 21, 2024, the Ballers fired Franklin and named Aaron Miles interim manager. Franklin held a 29–25 record.
