= Oakland Ballers =

American minor-league professional baseball team

- Founded in 2024; Oakland, California
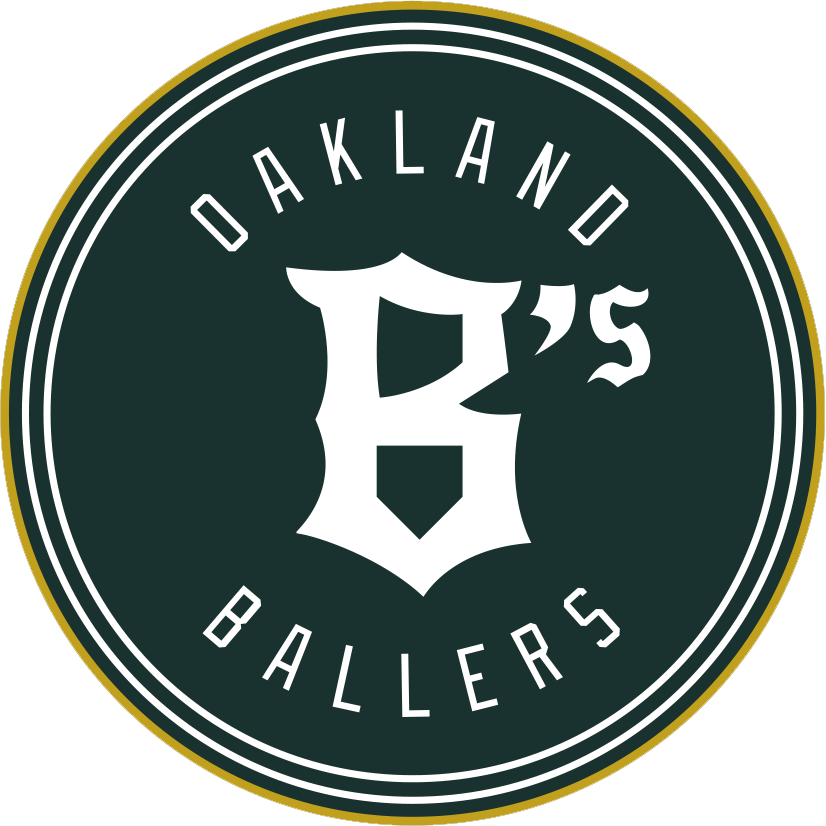

Team logo	Cap insignia

Minor league affiliations
- Class: Independent
- League: Pioneer League

Minor league titles
- League titles: 1 (2025)

Team data
- Name: Oakland B's
- Colors: Green, gold, gray
- Mascot: Scrappy the Rally Possum
- Ballpark: Raimondi Park (4,000)
- Owner(s)/ Operator(s): Oakland Ballers Baseball Club, Inc. (Paul Freedman & Bryan Carmel, founders)
- Manager: Aaron Miles
- Website: oaklandballers.com

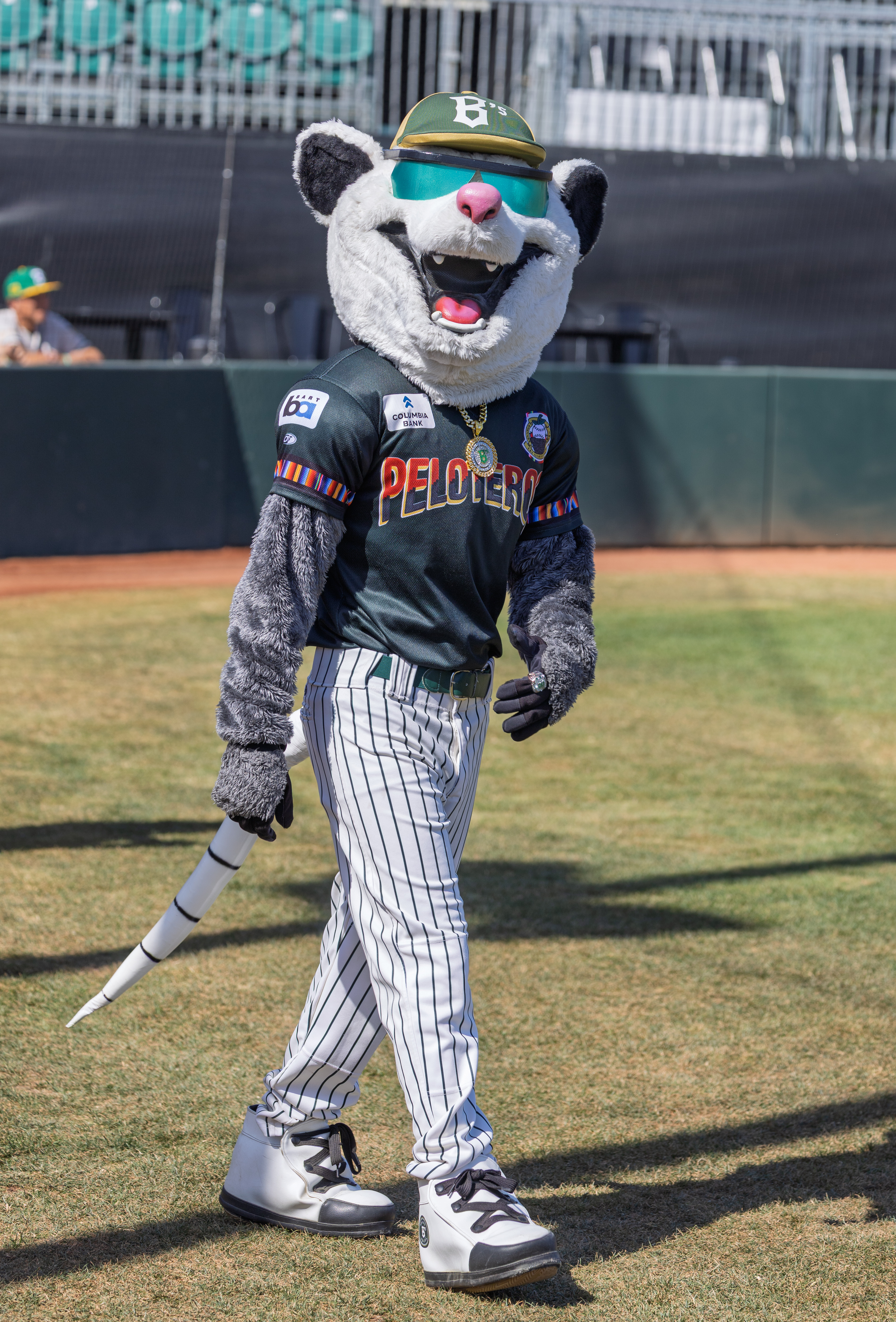
Ballers mascot Scrappy the Rally Possum in 2026

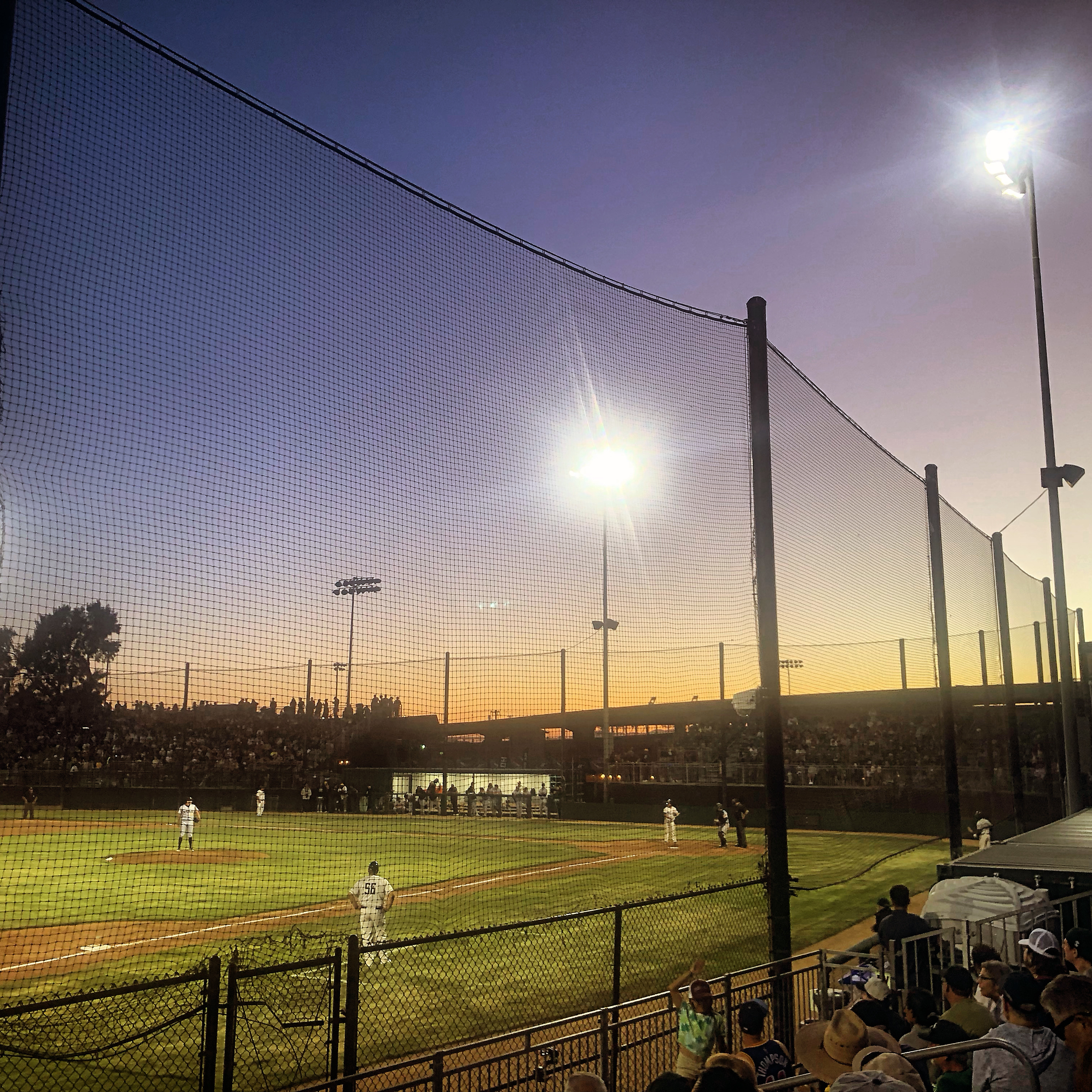
The Ballers in their inaugural home game, June 4, 2024

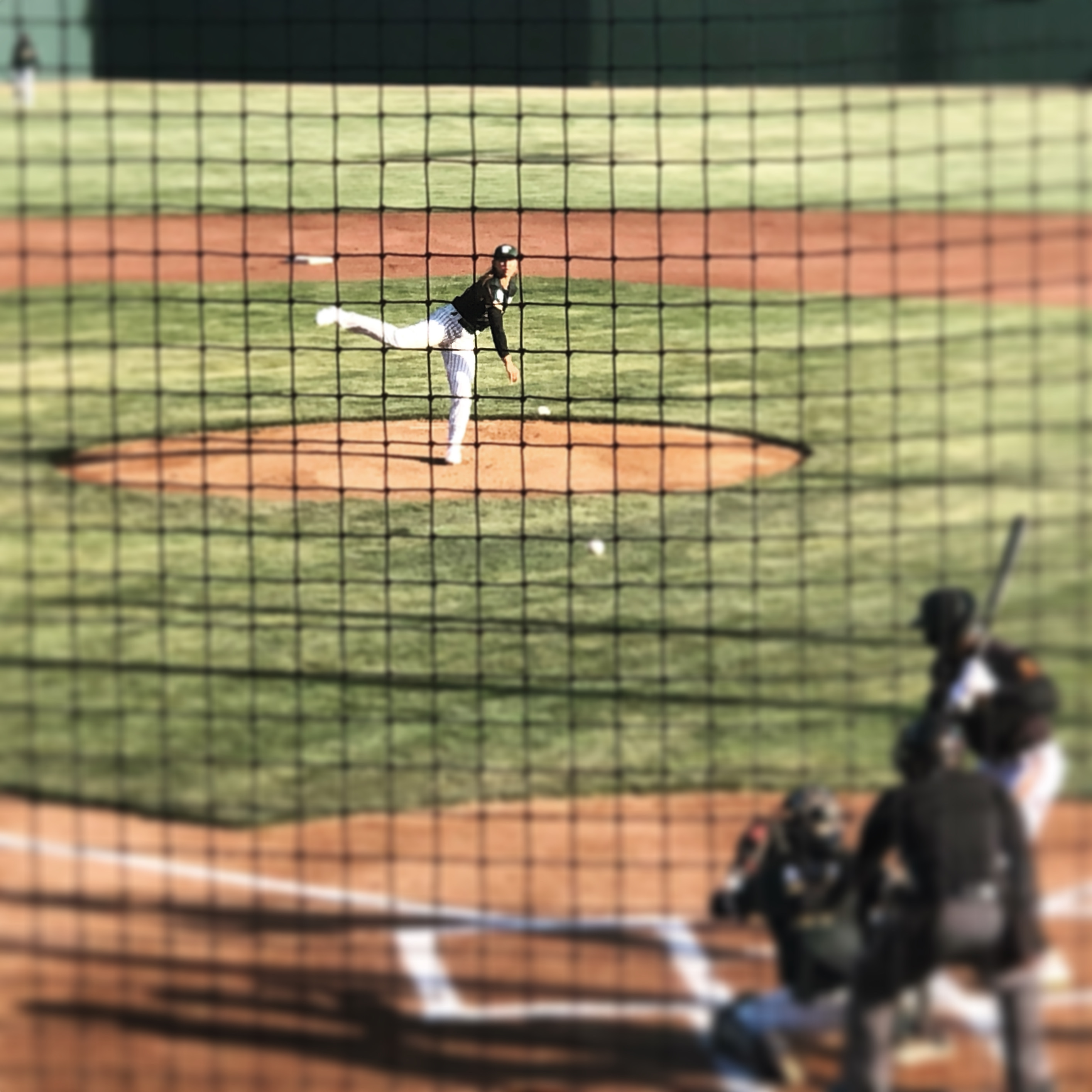
Kelsie Whitmore pitching in the Ballers' first season.

The Oakland Ballers, nicknamed the Oakland B's, are an independent baseball team that started play in the Pioneer League in 2024.

== History ==
The team was created following the approval of the Oakland Athletics' relocation to Las Vegas by MLB team owners. The non-profit Oakland 68s raised more than $2 million to establish the team and was inspired by the success of Oakland Roots SC soccer team. The press release for the team's announcement included a pledge for fan ownership based around a 2024 crowdfunding campaign. Don Wakamatsu was appointed as the team's first-ever executive vice president of baseball operations. The first player signed to the team was Dondrei Hubbard, announced on December 10, 2023.

They are located in Oakland, California, and initially planned to play their home games at Laney College, with an expansion of the park's facilities to hold upwards of 2,500 fans. A proposed game at the Oakland Coliseum was blocked by the Oakland Athletics. In February 2024 it was announced that they would instead play their home games at Raimondi Park in West Oakland, with a capacity of 4,000 fans.

On April 10, 2024, Kelsie Whitmore signed with the Oakland Ballers. She became the first woman to play for the Pioneer League when playing for the Ballers later that year. On June 6, 2024, playing for the Ballers, she became the first female player to start a Pioneer League game. In that game she struck out one batter.

On July 21, 2024, the Ballers fired manager Micah Franklin and named Aaron Miles interim manager. In August 2024, Oakland Ballers raised $8 million via DealMaker, an online capital raising platform.

On April 2, 2025, the Ballers played an exhibition game against the single A San Jose Giants. The game was referred to as Battle of the Bay 2.0, referring to the now-defunct regional rivalry between the San Francisco Giants and the Oakland Athletics. This was the first time in history an MLB affiliate team played against an Independent partner league team. The game was broadcast on KPIX+, and the Giants won the game 5–2.

== Roster ==
Oakland Ballers roster
Active (25-man) roster		Coaching staff
Pitchers: 26 Adam Bogosian; 17 Reed Butz; 32 James Colyer; 40 Brody Eglite; 10 Caleb Franzen; 16 Carson Lambert; 33 Dylan Matsuoka; 30 Noah Millikan; 35 Conner Richardson; 39 Luke Short; 14 Zach St. Pierre; 21 Connor Sullivan; 56 Gabe Tanner; Utility players: 11 Davis Drewek; 27 Pat Monteith	Catchers: 2 Tyler Lozano; 7 Dillon Tatum; Infielders: 29 Christian Almanza; 15 Cam Bufford; 3 Tremayne Cobb Jr.; 4 Daniel Harris IV; 23 Nick Leehey; 20 Ryan Pierce; 9 Esai Santos; Outfielders: 19 Darryl Buggs; 28 Lou Helmig; 8 Michael O'Hara	Manager: -- Aaron Miles; Coaches: -- Dee Brown (bullpen); -- Jim Dedrick (pitching); Disabled list; ‡ Inactive list; § Suspended list; updated 2025-06-29 Transactions

== Ballers in MLB ==
- Tyler Davis – Chicago White Sox (2024)

== Season-by-season results ==
Oakland Ballers
Season	League	Division	Overall	Win %	Finish	Manager	Playoffs
2024	Pioneer	—	58–38	.604	2nd	Micah Franklin (29–25); Aaron Miles (29–13)	Lost semifinals (Yolo) 1–2
2025	Pioneer	—	73–23	.760	1st	Aaron Miles	Won semifinals (Ogden) 2–1; Won finals 3–2 (Idaho Falls)
2026	Pioneer	—	46–50	.479	8th	Aaron Miles	
Totals			177–111	.606	—	—	6–5 (.545)
