= 324th Infantry Regiment =

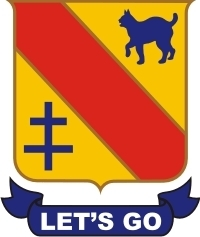
- Distinctive Unit Insignia of the 324th Infantry Regiment
- Active: 1917-1919; 1921-1945
- Country: United States
- Type: Infantry
- Role: Infantry
- Size: Regiment
- Motto: "Let's Go"
- Engagements: World War II

The 324th Infantry Regiment was an infantry regiment of the United States Army first organized in August 1917 as part of the 81st Division, National Army. During World War 1, the 324th Infantry saw combat in the defense of the St. Die sector of Lorraine, and took part in the Meuse–Argonne offensive. It was demobilized in June 1919 but reconstituted in the Organized Reserves in 1921, as part of the 81st Division. In 1942, the 324th Infantry was relieved from assignment to the 81st Division, allotted to the Army of the United States, and assigned to the 44th Infantry Division, a unit which fought as part of the 7th Army in France and Germany during World War II.

== History ==
=== World War I ===
The 324th Infantry was constituted in the National Army on 5 August 1917, and assigned to the 162d Infantry Brigade, 81st Division. It was organized on 29 August 1917 at Camp Jackson, South Carolina, made up predominantly of Selective Service men from North Carolina, South Carolina, and Tennessee. After completion of training the 81st Division (including the 324th Infantry) moved to Camp Sevier, South Carolina, to absorb additional selective service men and complete final preparations for deployment.

The 81st Division sailed from the United States in July-August 1918, and after a short stop in England consolidated at the 16th (Tonnerre) Training area in France and remained there until 14 September 1918, when the division moved to the St. Dié sector for "front-line training," a stint of service in a quiet sector designed to give the new soldiers exposure to combat without undue risk. The 81st Division and French 20th Division relieved the American 92d Division in the St. Dié sector on 20 September, where the 81st Division remained until being relieved by the Polish 1st Division on 19 October. Afterwards, the 81st Division marched to Rambervillers, France, to begin preparations for the Meuse-Argonne Offensive.

The 81st Division moved to Verdun on 31 October 1918, to take part in the Meuse-Argonne Offensive. On 6 October, the 81st Division was attached to the French II Colonial Corps, and the 81st Division relieved the US 35th Division in sector east of Verdun. The 324th Infantry led the attack of the 162d Infantry Brigade on the Woëvre Plain east of Etain on the morning of 9 November 1918. During the night of 9-10 November, the 2d Battalion, 324th Infantry was consolidated and during the following day (10 November) the remainder of the 324th Infantry around Manheuelles was relieved by elements of the 323d Infantry, one of the sister regiments in the 81st Division. During the evening of 10 November 1918, the 81st Division was ordered to resume the offensive on the morning of 11 November 1918. The 324th Infantry, less one battalion, was designated as the division reserve. At 1015 hours on 11 November, the 3d Battalion, 324th Infantry was ordered up to reinforce the rest of the 162d Brigade which was positioned along the Pintheville-Manheulles road, just short of the brigade's objective of Manheulles. The 3d Battalion, 324th Infantry was just moving into position when the Armistice took effect at 1100 hours on 11 November 1918.

Afterwards, the 81st Division remained in the region to enforce the terms of the Armistice, before being ordered to regroup near Chaumont, France. The 81st Division remained in the Department of Haute-Marne until mid-May 1919; the first elements of the division sailed for the United States in late May 1919, and the last of the division arrived at Newport News, Virginia on 24 June 1919. Despite its limited exposure to combat, the 324th Infantry lost a total of 171 wounded in action, 7 mortally wounded in action (died of wounds) and 37 men killed in action, a total of 215 casualties. Only one other infantry regiment suffered more casualties, and the losses of the 324th were about 22% of the total losses suffered by the 81st Division in the World War.

=== Interwar period ===
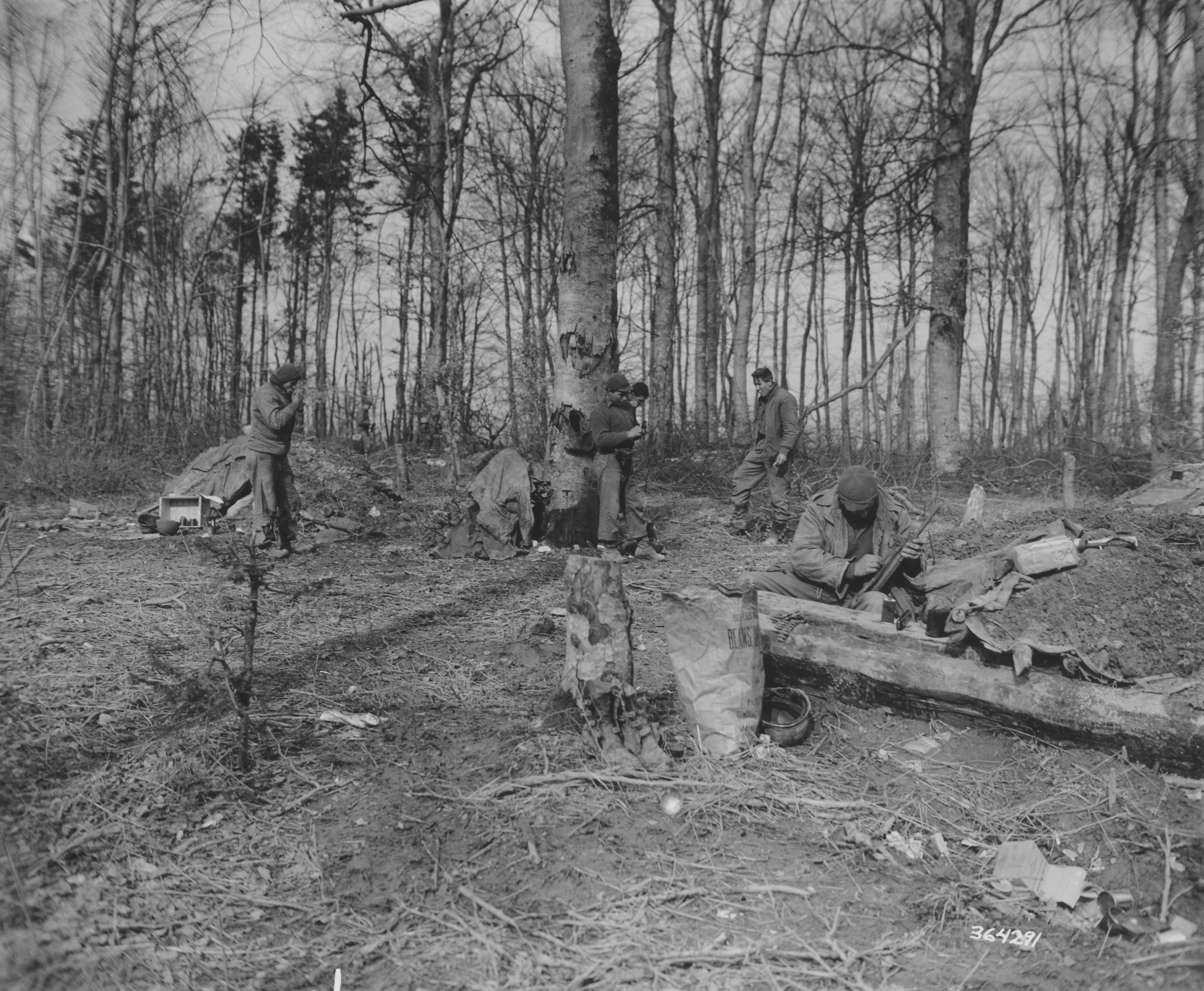
In a forest on the Saar front in the area of the 44th Division, soldiers of the 3rd Battalion, 324th Infantry Regiment, 44th Infantry Division, are cleaning their weapons after returning from a mission.

The 324th Infantry returned to the United States on the USS Martha Washington and was demobilized on 17 June 1919 at Camp Devens, Massachusetts. The regiment was reconstituted in the Organized Reserve on 24 June 1921, assigned to the 81st Division, and allotted to the Fourth Corps Area. The regimental headquarters was initiated on 7 December 1921 at Memphis, Tennessee, with the three battalion headquarters initiated in January 1922 at Memphis, Jackson, and Nashville, Tennessee, respectively. The personnel of the regiment conducted annual training most years with the 4th Division's 22nd Infantry Regiment at Fort Oglethorpe or Fort McPherson, Georgia, or with the 4th Division's 8th Infantry Regiment at Camp McClellan, Alabama. An alternate form of annual training was administering the infantry Citizens' Military Training Camps at Camp McClellan or Camp Beauregard, Louisiana. The primary Reserve Officers' Training Corps "feeder school" for new lieutenants for the regiment was the program at the University of Tennessee in Knoxville.

=== World War II ===
The 324th Infantry Regiment was inactivated and relieved from assignment to the 81st Division on 30 January 1942 when the division was converted from the old "square" to the new "triangular" configuration before being ordered to active duty. On 1 February 1943, the regiment was withdrawn from the Organized Reserve, allotted to the Army of the United States, assigned as an element of the 44th Infantry Division, and reactivated at Fort Lewis, Washington. The 324th Infantry served in France and Germany. It served in the Blies Valley near Frauenberg, Blies Ebersing and Bliesbruck but also near Woellfing and Wiesviller and Petit Rederching. It returned to the United States on 20 July 1945. It moved to Camp Chaffee, Arkansas on 24 July 1945 where it was inactivated on 1 November 1945. While inactive, the regiment was consolidated with the New Jersey National Guard's 113th Infantry Regiment on 9 July 1946, and the consolidated unit designated as the 113th Infantry.
