= 162nd Infantry Brigade (United States) =

American military unit

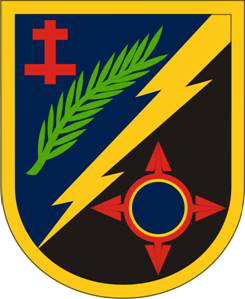
- Shoulder sleeve insignia
- Active: 1917-1919 ? - 1965; 1 May 2009 - 14 July 2014
- Country: United States
- Branch: U.S. Army
- Type: Training
- Size: Brigade
- Garrison/HQ: Fort Polk, LA
- Battle honours: World War I World War II

Insignia
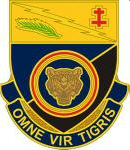
- Distinctive unit insignia

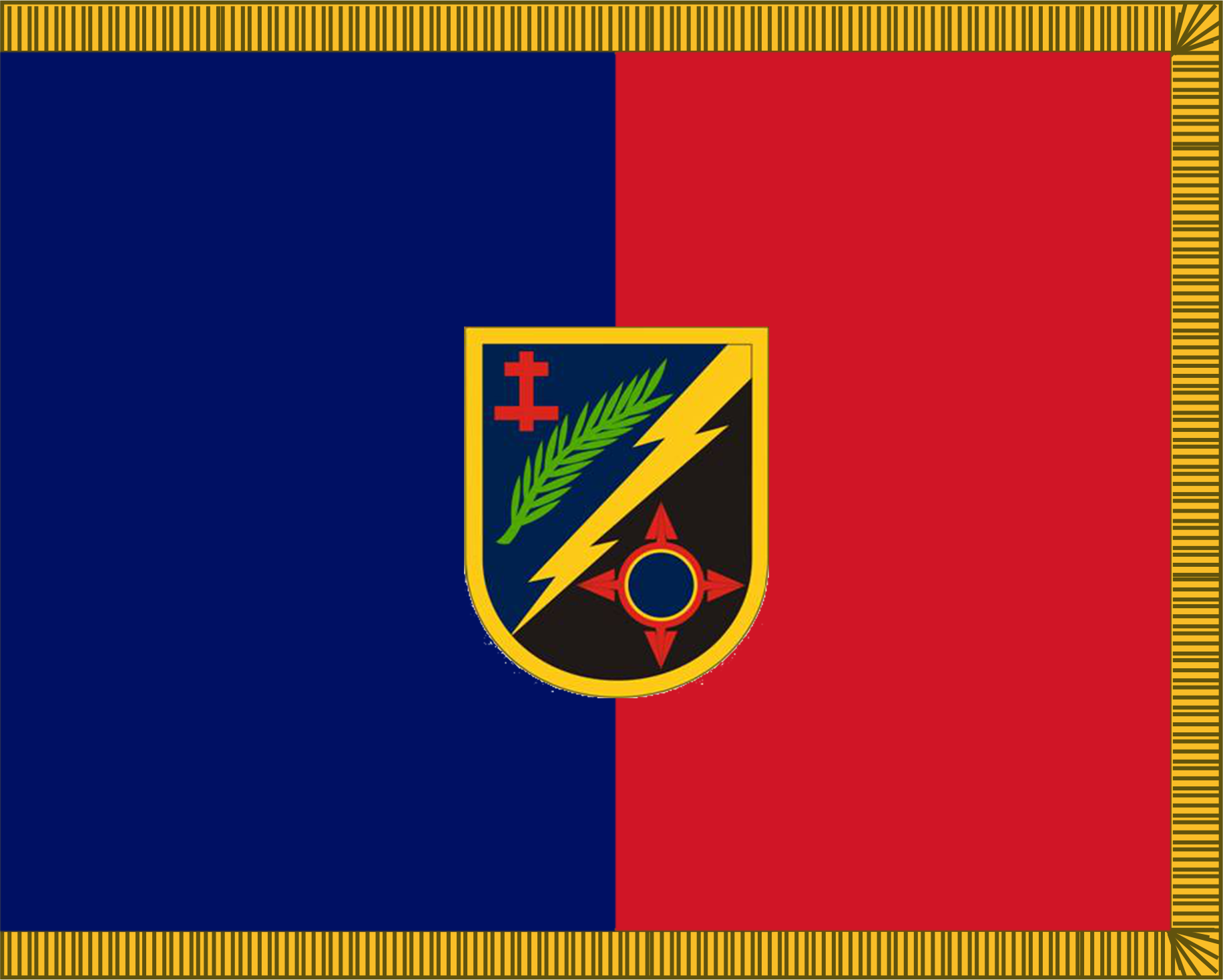
- 162nd Infantry Brigade Flag

The 162nd Infantry Brigade was an active duty Infantry training brigade of the United States Army based at Fort Polk, Louisiana. The brigade was responsible for training the Security Forces Assistance – Security Cooperation teams, also known as Military Transition Teams, prior to their deployment to Operations Enduring Freedom and New Dawn from 2010 until its inactivation in 2014.

== During World War One ==
The 81st Infantry Division "Wildcats" was organized as a National Division of the United States Army in August 1917 during World War I at Camp Jackson, South Carolina. The division was originally organized with a small cadre of Regular Army officers, while the soldiers were predominantly Selective Service men drawn from the southeastern United States. After organizing and finishing training, the 81st Division deployed to Europe, arriving on the Western Front in August 1918. Elements of the 81st Division first saw limited action by defending the St. Dié sector in September and early October. After relief of mission, the 81st Division was attached to the American First Army in preparation for the Meuse-Argonne Offensive. In the last days of World War I, the 81st Division attacked a portion of the German Army's defensive line on 9 November 1918, and remained engaged in combat operations until the Armistice with Germany at 1100 hours on 11 November 1918. After the cessation of hostilities, the 81st Division remained in France until May 1919; after which the division was shipped back to the United States and inactivated on 11 June 1919.

During World War I, infantry brigades were purely tactical formations. Administrative and logistical functions were conducted by the division headquarters. The brigade headquarters was composed of the commander (a brigadier general), his three aides, a brigade adjutant, and eighteen enlisted men who furnished mess, transportation, and communications services.

During World War I, the 162nd Infantry Brigade was composed of 8,134 personnel organized in a headquarters detachment with 5 officers and 18 enlisted soldiers, the 321st and 322nd Infantry Regiments, each with 3,755 officers and enlisted soldiers, and the 317th Machine Gun Battalion with 581 officers and enlisted soldiers.

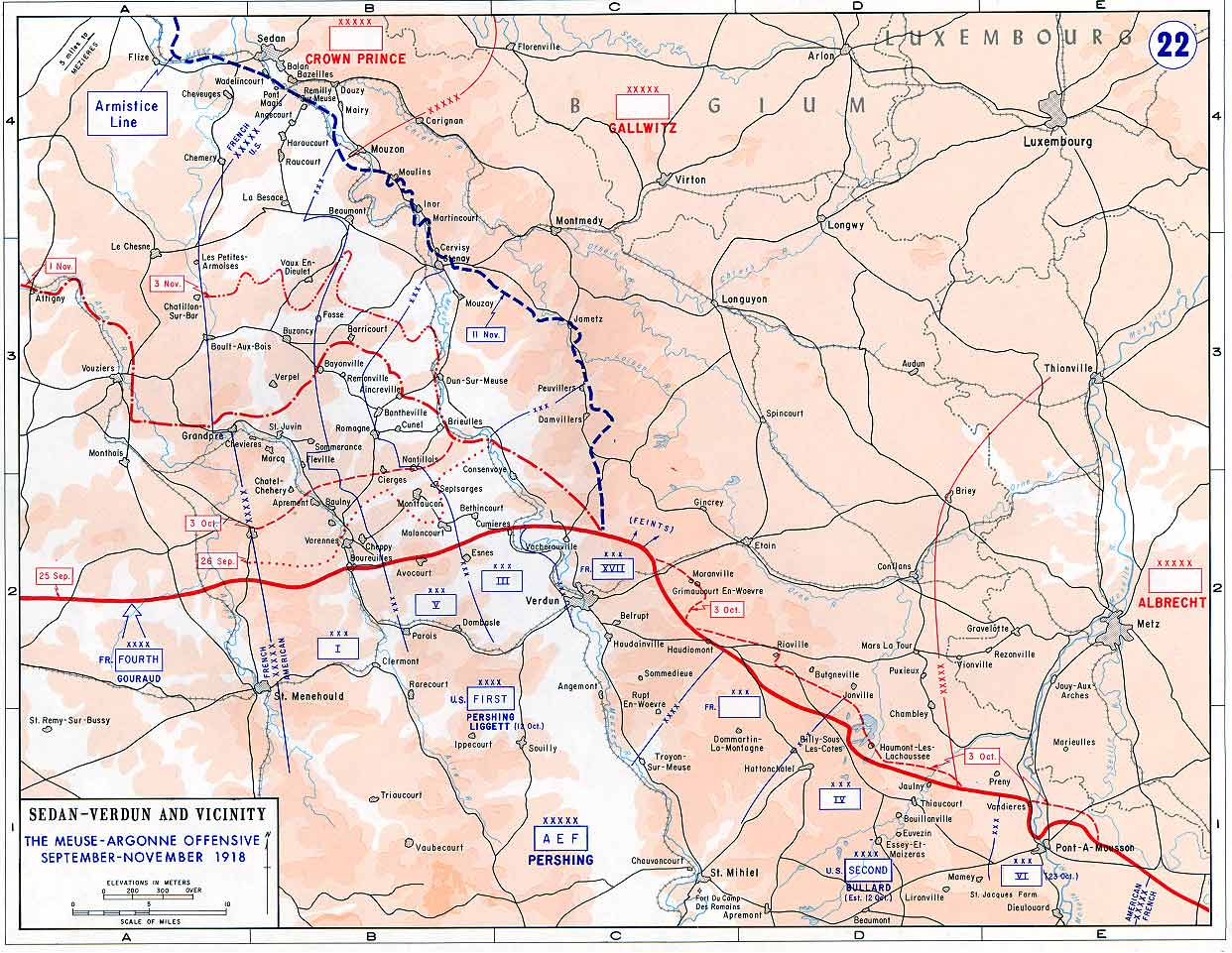

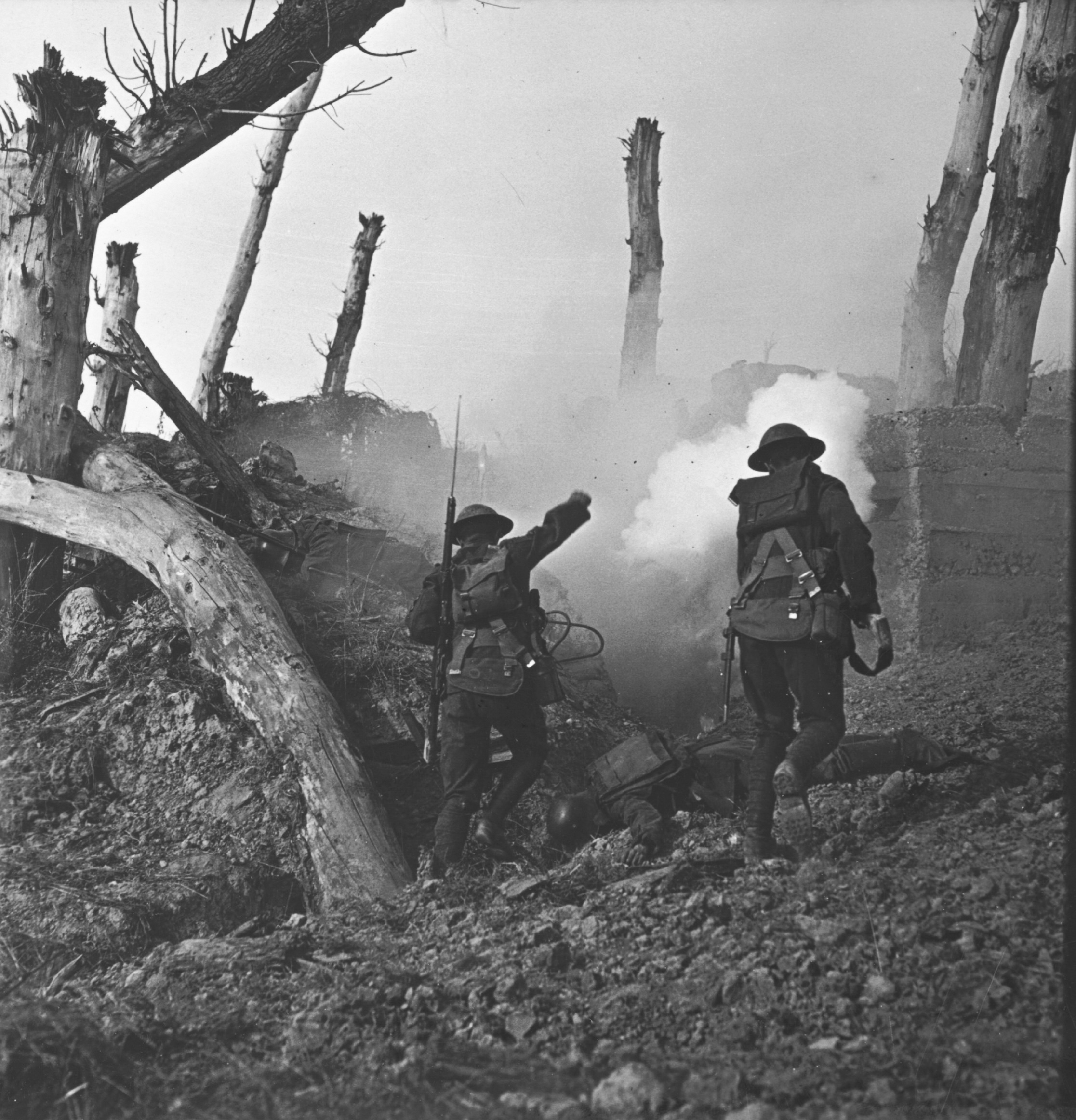

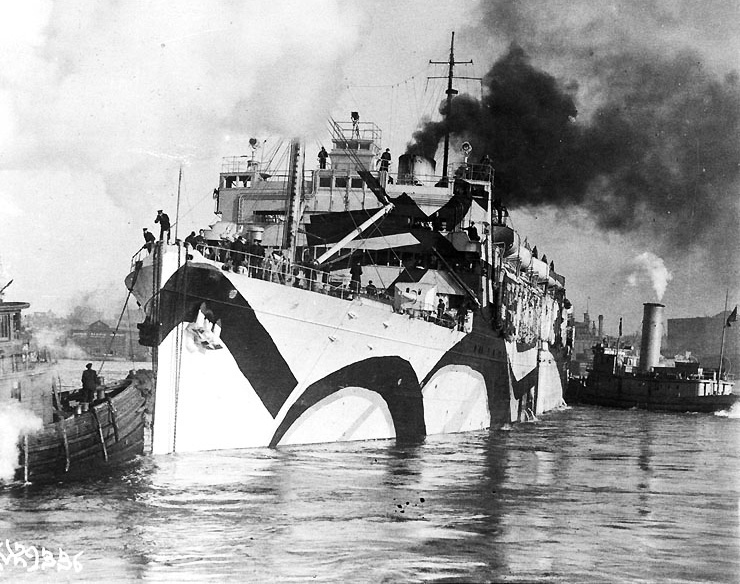
- Equipment:
  - M1917 Browning machine gun
  - M1918 Browning Automatic Rifle
  - M1917 Enfield
  - Brodie Helmet
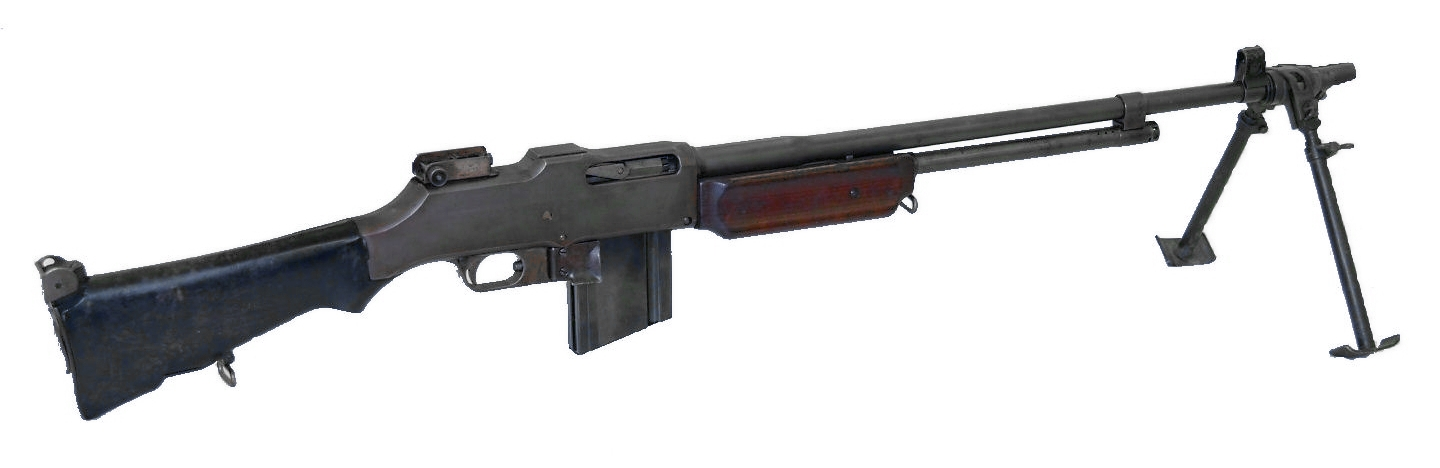

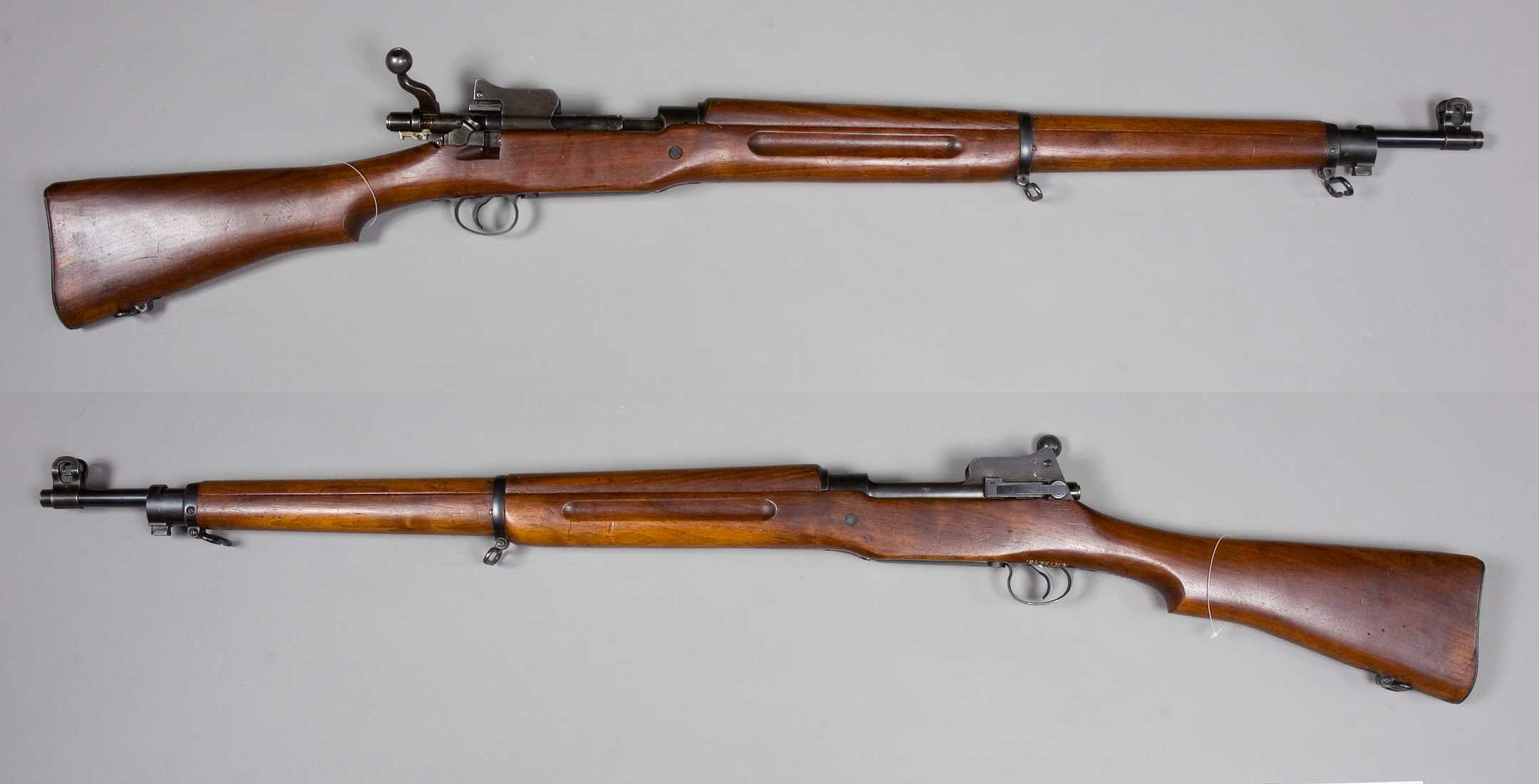

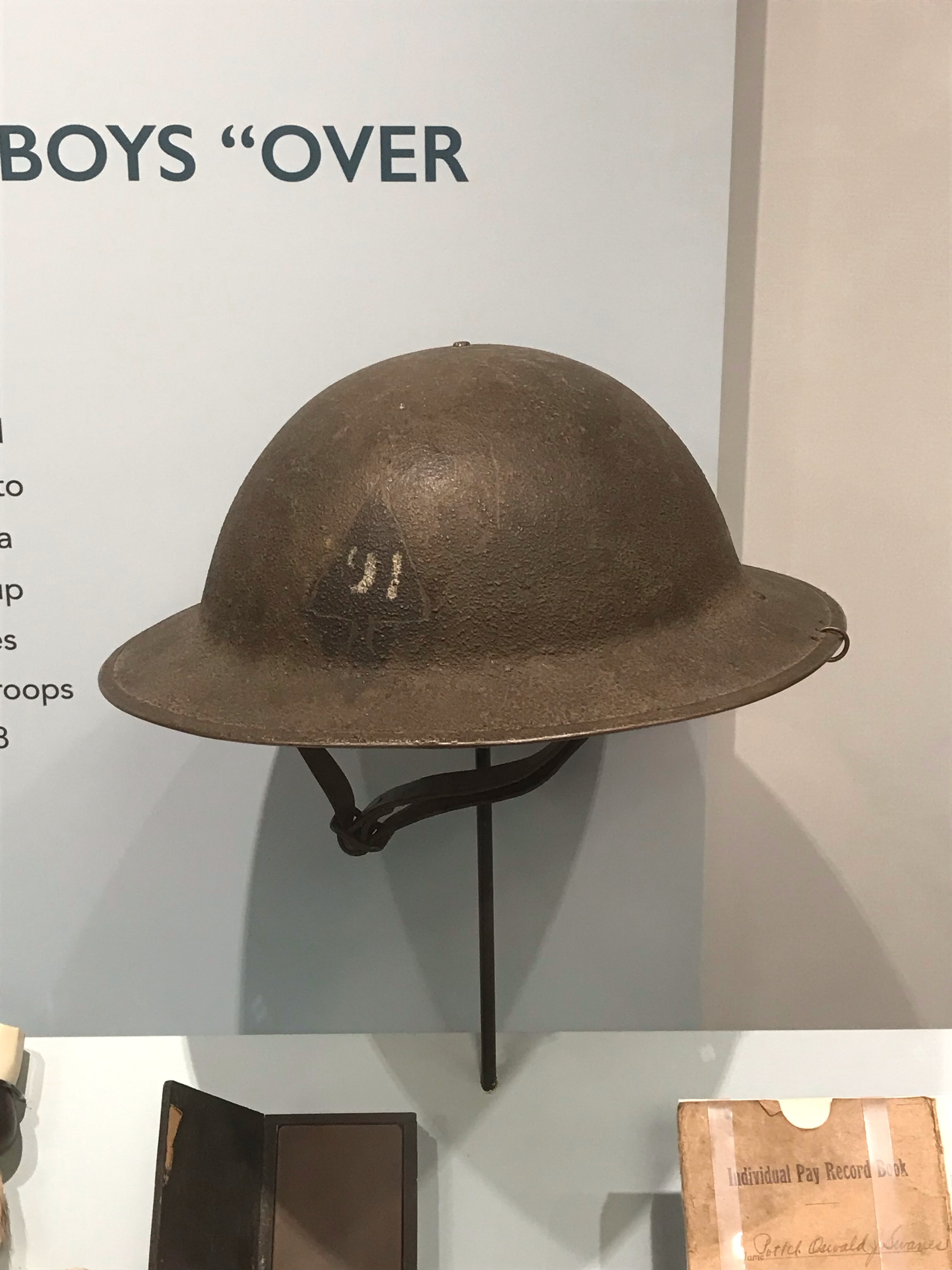

== During the Global War on Terror ==
The 162nd Infantry Brigade was organized to assume the advisory training mission and replace the 1st Brigade, 1st Infantry Division which reorganized as a deployable formation. U.S. forces were trained to prepare foreign civilian and military security forces within Afghanistan and Iraq for the transfer of security responsibilities back to the host nations. The Security Forces Assistance – Security Cooperation Team Training Brigade has provided rotational units with the capability to provide training, coaching, and mentoring to the Afghanistan National Army and other Afghan Security forces in Afghanistan. The brigade was inactivated as the mission changed to the deployment of brigade combat teams to mentor their foreign counterparts. This mission evolved into the Security Force Assistance Brigade (SFAB) to prevent the disruption to the brigade combat teams' core warfighting competencies and better focus the training and expertise in the dedicated SFABs.

== Organization ==
=== 1917-1919 ===
- Headquarters, 161st Infantry Brigade
  - 321st Infantry Regiment
  - 322nd Infantry Regiment
  - 317th Machine Gun Battalion

=== 2009-2014 ===
Major subordinate commands of the brigade are:

- Headquarters, 162nd Infantry Brigade
- 1st Battalion, 353rd Regiment
- 2nd Battalion, 353rd Regiment
- 3rd Battalion, 353rd Regiment
- 4th Battalion, 353rd Regiment
- 5th Battalion, 353rd Regiment
- 6th Battalion, 353rd Regiment

== Sources ==
- Creation
- The Institute of Heraldry: 162nd Infantry Brigade, (Archived 2009-05-02)
