= Henry C. Newcomer =

U.S. Army brigadier general

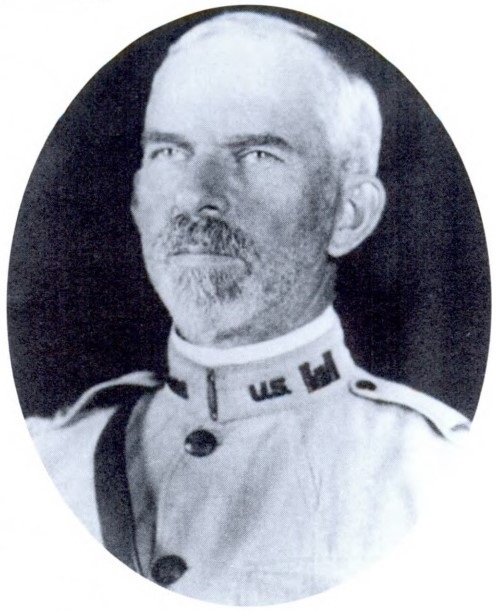
- Newcomer as a lieutenant colonel in 1915. From 1992's The Ohio River Division, U.S. Army Corps of Engineers
- Born: April 3, 1861; Upton, Pennsylvania, U.S.
- Died: December 3, 1952 (aged 91); Washington, District of Columbia, U.S.
- Burial place: Arlington National Cemetery
- Education: Mount Morris College; United States Military Academy
- Spouse: Rebecca Kosier (m. 1886–1913) Lily Armour (m. 1915–1947)
- Children: 3, including Francis
- Military career
- Service: United States Army
- Service years: 1886–1925
- Rank: Brigadier General
- Service number: 0–125
- Unit: U.S. Army Corps of Engineers
- Commands: Department of Engineering, United States Military Academy; 3rd Engineer District; Surface Transportation Division, Engineer Commissioner of Washington, D.C. Company E, 2nd Engineer Battalion; Nashville Engineer District; Chattanooga Engineer District; Pittsburgh Engineer District; 3rd Engineer Regiment; Gulf Engineer Division; Second New York Engineer District; Puerto Rico Engineer District
- Wars: World War I
- Other work: Director, Union Trust Company; Member, Board of Trustees, Columbia Institution for the Deaf

Henry C. Newcomer (April 3, 1861 – December 3, 1952) was a career officer in the United States Army. A member of the Corps of Engineers, he served from 1886 until 1925, and specialized in rivers and harbors construction. A veteran of World War I, he attained the rank of brigadier general. During his career, Newcomer commanded Company E, 2nd Engineer Battalion and the 3rd Engineer Battalion, in addition to serving as assistant director of the Chemical Warfare Service during the First World War.

A native of Upton, Pennsylvania, Newcomer was raised in Upton, Martinsburg, West Virginia, and Mount Morris, Illinois. After attending Mount Morris College, in 1882, he was appointed to the United States Military Academy (West Point). He graduated in 1886 ranked first in his class, and was commissioned in the Corps of Engineers. Newcomer's initial assignments included improvement to the harbor defenses of San Francisco Bay and assistant professor of engineering at West Point. From 1896 to 1900, he planned and oversaw execution of improvements to navigation and flood control on the Mississippi River. From 1900 to 1903, he was assistant to the engineering commissioner for Washington, D.C.'s city government, and from 1903 to 1904, he commanded Company E, 2nd Engineer Battalion.

Newcomer's later postings included chief engineer of the Corps of Engineers' Central Division, which was based in Pittsburgh. From 1916 to 1918, Newcomer served in the office of the Chief of Engineers. From August 1918 to January 1919, he performed World War I service as assistant director of the Chemical Warfare Service. After the war, Newcomer was assigned as chief engineer of the Hawaiian Engineer District and commander of the 3rd Engineer Battalion. Newcomer retired in 1925. He died in Washington, D.C. on December 3, 1952. Newcomer was buried at Arlington National Cemetery.

== Early life ==
Henry Clay Newcomer was born in April 1861 Upton, Pennsylvania, a son of Dr. David Newcomer, a Union Army veteran of the American Civil War, and Mary Shelley (Funk) Newcomer. Newcomer was raised and educated in Upton, Martinsburg, West Virginia, and Mount Morris, Illinois as his father moved the family while searching for a permanent place to locate his medical practice. He was a graduate of the public schools of Mount Morris, after which he attended Mount Morris College. As a teenager, Newcomer clerked in a drug store and taught school. In June 1882, he was appointed to the United States Military Academy (USMA) at West Point, New York by U.S. Representative Robert M. A. Hawk.

In July 1886, Newcomer graduated from West Point, ranked first in his class of 77. As with most top-ranking cadets of his day, Newcomer was commissioned as a second lieutenant in the Corps of Engineers of the United States Army. More than 30 percent of Newcomer's class attained the rank of brigadier general or higher either before, during, or just after World War I. They included: Mason Patrick, Thomas H. Rees, Lucien G. Berry, Frank McIntyre, John E. McMahon, Avery D. Andrews, Charles T. Menoher, Albert D. Kniskern, Charles C. Wolcutt Jr., John J. Pershing, Peter E. Traub, Benjamin A. Poore, Jesse McI. Carter, Chauncey B. Baker, Malvern Hill Barnum, William H. Hay, James H. McRae, Walter H. Gordon, Arthur Johnson, Frank L. Winn, Charles C. Ballou, George B. Duncan, Lucius L. Durfee, Julius Penn and Edward M. Lewis.

== Start of career ==
From September 1886 to August 1889, Newcomer was posted to Fort Totten, New York's Engineer School of Application, where he was an instructor in submarine mining. (Note: Submarine mining was the tactic of employing underwater mines for harbor defense.) He was promoted to first lieutenant in July 1888. From 1889 to 1892, he was an assistant to Colonel George H. Mendell, an Engineer officer who supervised construction of improvements to the coastal defenses of San Francisco Bay. From 1892 to 1896, Newcomer was assigned as an assistant professor of engineering at West Point, and he was head of the academy's engineering department from 1894 to 1896.

From 1896 to 1898, Newcomer was in charge of the army's 3rd Engineer District, responsible for planning and supervising completion of improvements to navigation and flood control on the Mississippi River. He was promoted to captain in July 1897. In 1898, he also served as engineer and inspector of the 16th Lighthouse District. From 1898 to 1900, Newcomer was in charge of the Little Rock Engineer District, where he oversaw navigation and flood control improvements to the Arkansas River. From 1900 to 1903, he served as assistant to the Engineer Commissioner of Washington, D.C.'s city government and as chief of the commissioner's surface transportation division, which included planning and beginning construction of the Taft Bridge. From 1903 to 1904, he commanded Company E, 2nd Engineer Battalion. In April 1904, Newcomer received promotion to major.

== Continued career ==
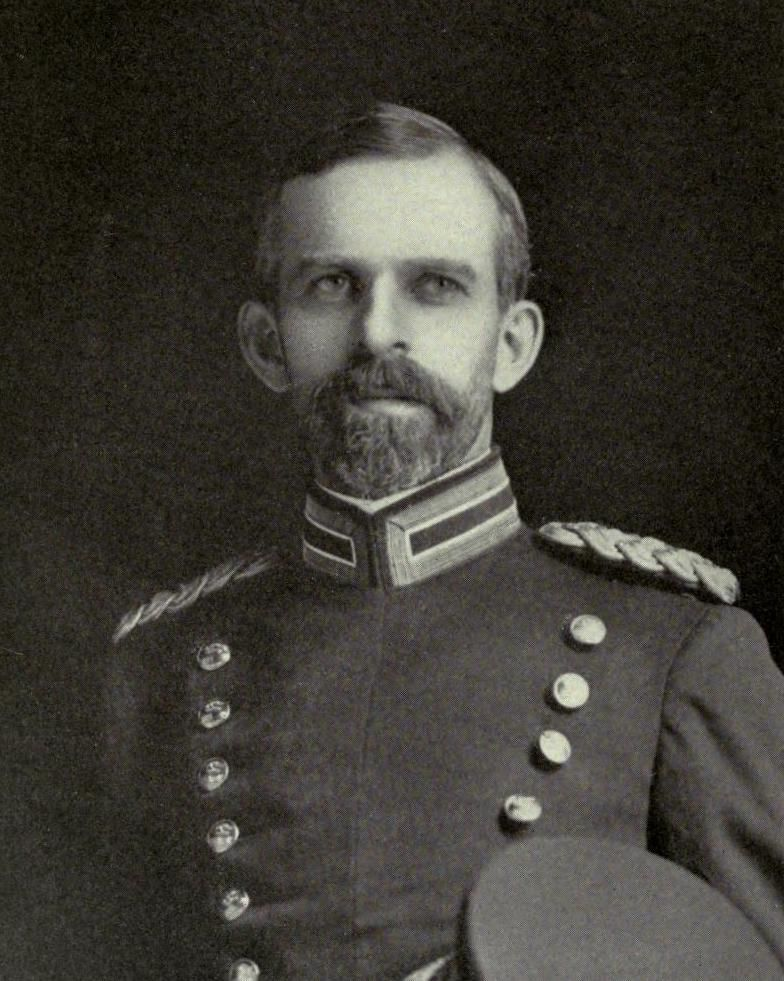
Newcomer as a lieutenant colonel in 1911

From 1904 to 1907, Newcomer was chief engineer of the Nashville District and Chattanooga District, where he planned and oversaw flood control and navigation improvements on the Cumberland River and Tennessee River. From 1907 to 1912, he was chief engineer of the Pittsburgh District, where he led improvements to the Ohio River, Allegheny River, and Monongahela River. From 1910 to 1916, he was a member of the Board of Engineers for Rivers and Harbors, a Corps of Engineers panel that carried long range studies and planning for improvements to rivers and harbors throughout the United States. Newcomer was promoted to lieutenant colonel in February 1910.

From 1914 to 1915, Newcomer was the officer in charge of the Washington Engineer District and oversaw maintenance and improvements to the Washington Aqueduct. From July 1916 to August 1918, he served during World War I as assistant to the Chief of Engineers. In August 1918, he was promoted to temporary brigadier general. Newcomer was assistant chief of the Chemical Warfare Service from August 1918 to January 1919, and was responsible for recruiting personnel into this new service branch, as well as its initial organization and training. From January to March 1919, he again served as assistant to the Chief of Engineers.

== Later career ==
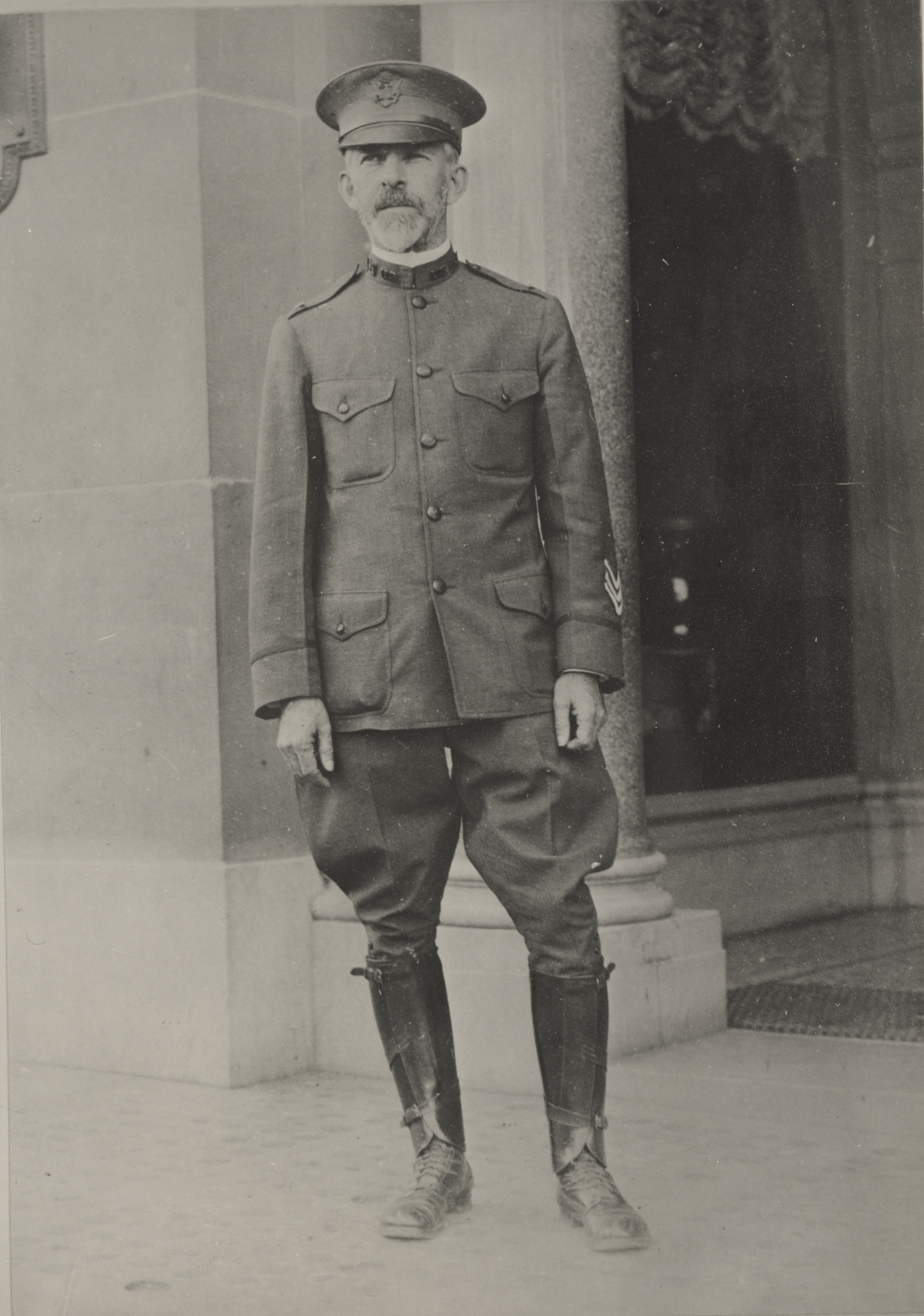
National Archives photo of Newcomer as a brigadier general during World War I

From 1919 to 1920, Newcomer was chief engineer of the Hawaiian Engineer District and commander of the 3rd Engineer Battalion. From September 1920 to June 1922, he was posted to New Orleans as chief engineer of the Gulf Engineer Division. From June 1922 to December 1924, Newcomer was assigned to New York City as engineer of the Northeast Division. At the same time, he served as a member of the Board of Engineers for Rivers and Harbors and the New York Harbor Line Board, in addition to serving as officer in charge of the Second New York Engineer District and the Puerto Rico Engineer District.

Newcomer left the army as a colonel upon reaching the mandatory retirement age of 64 in April 1925. In June 1930, the U.S. Congress enacted legislation enabling the general officers of the First World War to retire at their highest rank, and Newcomer was promoted to brigadier general on the retired list. In retirement, Newcomer was a member of the board of directors of the Union Trust Company and the Columbia Institution for the Deaf. In addition, he served as a regional vice president of the American Unitarian Association.

Newcomer died in Washington, D.C. on December 3, 1952. He was buried at Arlington National Cemetery.

== Family ==
In 1886, Newcomer married Rebecca Kosier. She died in 1913, and in 1915 he married Lily Armour. With his first wife, Newcomer was the father of three sons. Henry Sidney Newcomer, known as Sidney, was a World War I veteran who became a prominent scientist, physician, and inventor. Francis K. Newcomer was a career army officer who attained the rank of brigadier general. David Albert Newcomer was also a career army officer had reached the rank of colonel before being killed in action in 1944.

Henry Crandall Newcomer, the son of H. Sidney Newcomer, was a United States Air Force officer and retired as a brigadier general. Francis Kosier Newcomer Jr. was a career army officer who retired as a colonel.
