= Walter Henry Gordon =

United States Army general (1863–1924)

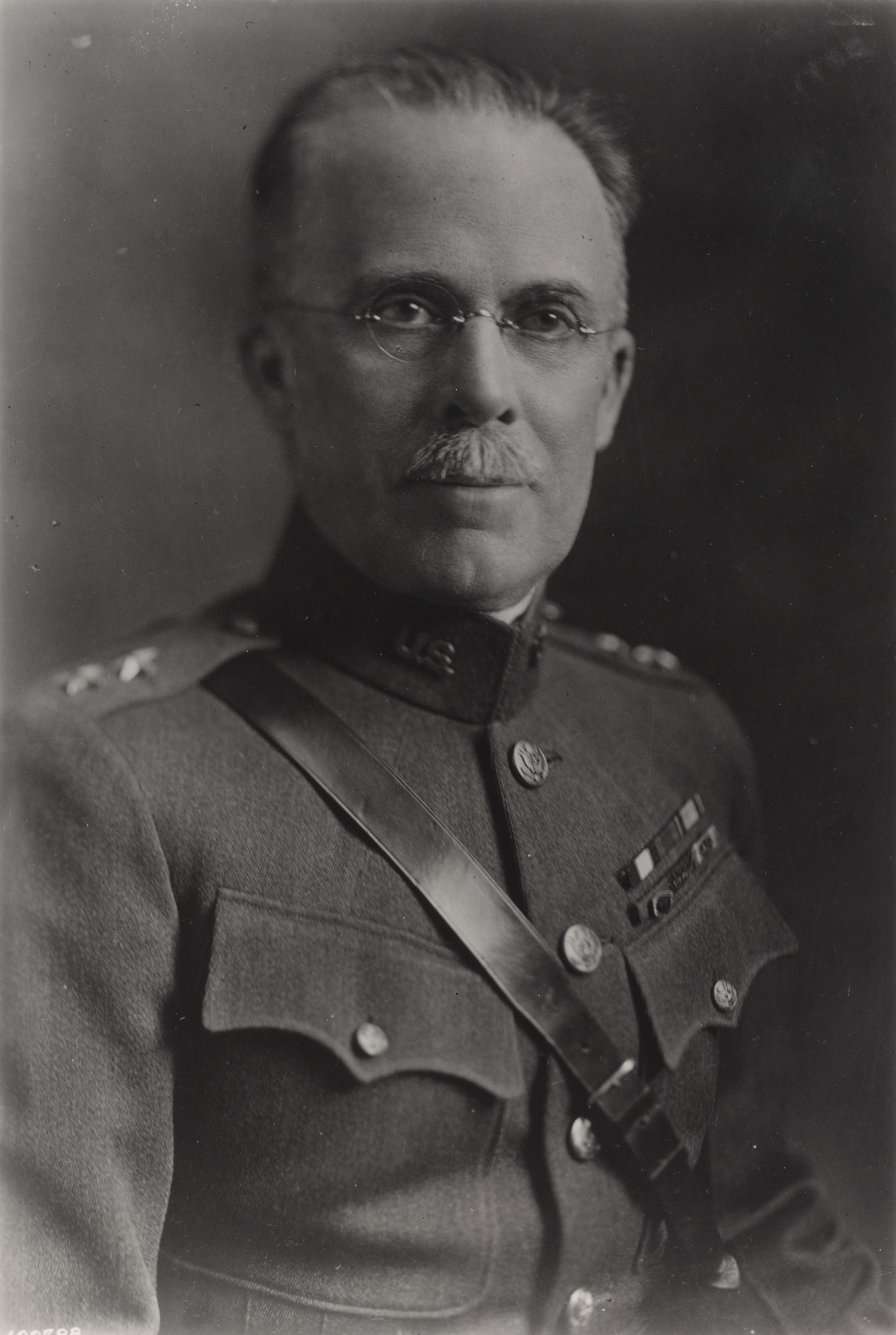
- Walter Henry Gordon, pictured here wearing the two stars of a major general c. 1923
- Born: June 24, 1863; Artonish, Mississippi, United States
- Died: April 26, 1924 (aged 60); Washington, D.C., United States
- Burial place: Arlington National Cemetery, Virginia, United States
- Military career
- Allegiance: United States
- Branch: United States Army
- Service years: 1886–1924
- Rank: Major General
- Service number: 0-73
- Unit: Infantry Branch
- Commands: United States Army Infantry School; Fourth Corps Area; 82nd Division; 21st Regiment; 6th Division; 10th Brigade; 15th Regiment; 31st Regiment; 3rd U.S. Infantry Regiment (The Old Guard)
- Conflicts: American Indian Wars; Philippine–American War; World War I
- Awards: Army Distinguished Service Medal; Legion of Honour (France); Croix de Guerre (France)

Major General Walter Henry Gordon (June 24, 1863 – April 26, 1924) was a decorated officer in the United States Army. A veteran of the Philippine–American War, he is most noted for his service as commanding general (CG) of the 6th Division, which saw heavy fighting during the Meuse–Argonne offensive, the largest battle in the history of the United States Army, in late 1918.

== Early military career ==
Walter Henry Gordon was born on June 24, 1863, in Artonish, Mississippi, as the son of William Crawford and Mary (Lewis) Gordon. Following high school, Gordon received an appointment to the United States Military Academy (USMA) at West Point, New York, in 1882. He graduated 53rd of 77 with a bachelor of Science degree and was commissioned as a second lieutenant in the Infantry Branch of the United States Army on July 1, 1886.

Gordon spent his years at the academy in the great company of future distinguished men and many of his classmates became general officers later. For example: John J. Pershing, Avery D. Andrews, Chauncey B. Baker, Charles C. Ballou, Malvern H. Barnum, Jesse McI. Carter, George B. Duncan, William H. Hay, Arthur Johnson, Albert D. Kniskern, Edward M. Lewis, Frank McIntyre, John E. McMahon, James McRae, Charles T. Menoher, Thomas B. Mott, Henry C. Newcomer, Mason Patrick, Julius Penn, Benjamin A. Poore, Thomas H. Rees, Peter E. Traub, Charles C. Walcutt Jr. or Frank L. Winn.

He was subsequently ordered to the Madison Barracks, Sackets Harbor, New York, where he joined the 12th Infantry Regiment. Gordon served there until July 1887, when his regiment was transferred to Fort Yates, North Dakota, for frontier duty during the Indian Wars. In November 1890, he was ordered to Willet's Point, where he attended the instruction at the Torpedo School.

Gordon was promoted to first lieutenant in November 1892 and joined the 18th Infantry Regiment at Fort Leavenworth, Kansas. He served there until June 1893, when he was transferred to Chicago for temporary duty during World's Columbian Exposition. In March 1894, he was attached for garrison duty to Fort Bliss, Texas, and remained there until September of that year. Gordon then assumed duty as Professor of Military Science and Tactics at the Louisiana State University in Baton Rouge, Louisiana.

After one year in this capacity, Gordon rejoined the 18th Infantry at Fort Sam Houston, Texas, and remained there until December 1896, when he assumed duty as Professor of Military Science and Tactics at Delaware College in Newark, Delaware.

Following the United States entry into the War with Spain over the Spanish colonies on Cuba in April 1898, Gordon was appointed to the temporary rank of major of the Volunteers and sent to Middletown, Delaware, for mustering duty with the 1st Delaware Volunteer Infantry. He then served with the regiment at Camp Meade, Pennsylvania, and at Wilmington, Delaware, and was promoted to the temporary rank of colonel of the Volunteers in September that year.

Gordon was mustered out of Volunteer Service on November 16, 1898, and reverted to his regular Army rank of first lieutenant. Following a brief leave at home, Gordon again rejoined the 18th Infantry Regiment in mid-January 1899 and embarked for the Philippines for garrison duty. While en route to that country, Philippine–American War broke out and he was promoted to captain on March 2, 1899. Gordon went ashore at the end of March and participated in combats against insurgents on Island of Panay as company commander and commander of Detachment of Mounted Scouts until September 1901.

He then returned to the United States and was stationed at Fort D. A. Russell, Wyoming and took part in the maneuvers at Fort Riley in September–October 1902. Gordon then sailed back to the Philippines in March 1903 and served as Acting Assistant Adjutant-General, Headquarters, Department of the Visayas during the Moro Rebellion. He returned to the United States in February 1905 and was stationed with 18th Infantry at Fort Leavenworth, Kansas, and participated in the maneuvers at Fort Riley, Kansas.

Gordon returned to the Philippines for the third time in November 1907 and served as regimental adjutant until February 1908, when he was appointed Officer-in-charge of the Military Information Division at the headquarters, Philippine Department and remained in that capacity until November 1908. Upon his return to the United States, he was assigned to the Military Information Division, War Department General Staff in Washington, D.C., and was promoted to major on March 23, 1909.

In May 1909, Gordon became sick and was on leave until March 1910, when he was attached to the Office of the Inspector General of the Army under Brigadier General Ernest A. Garlington. He remained in that capacity just for a month, before joining the headquarters of the Department of Dakota at St. Paul, Minnesota, as inspector-general.

Gordon was detached in August 1913 and entered the course at the Army War College, which he completed in June 1914. He was then ordered to Plattsburg Barracks, where he joined 3rd Infantry Regiment and was promoted to lieutenant colonel on September 13, 1914. Gordon assumed command of the regiment and led his unit during the maneuvers at Madison Barracks in September–October of that year. By this time, World War I had already begun in Europe but the United States chose to remain neutral.

He was ordered again to the Philippines in November 1915 and joined the 8th Infantry Regiment in Manila. Gordon then assumed command of Cuartel de España barracks and was promoted to colonel on July 1, 1916. He was then tasked with the organization and command of the 31st Infantry Regiment at Fort William McKinley, Philippines and led this formation until the end of June 1917, just a few weeks after the American entry into World War I. Gordon then embarked for China and assumed command of the 15th Infantry Regiment at Tianjin.

== World War I ==
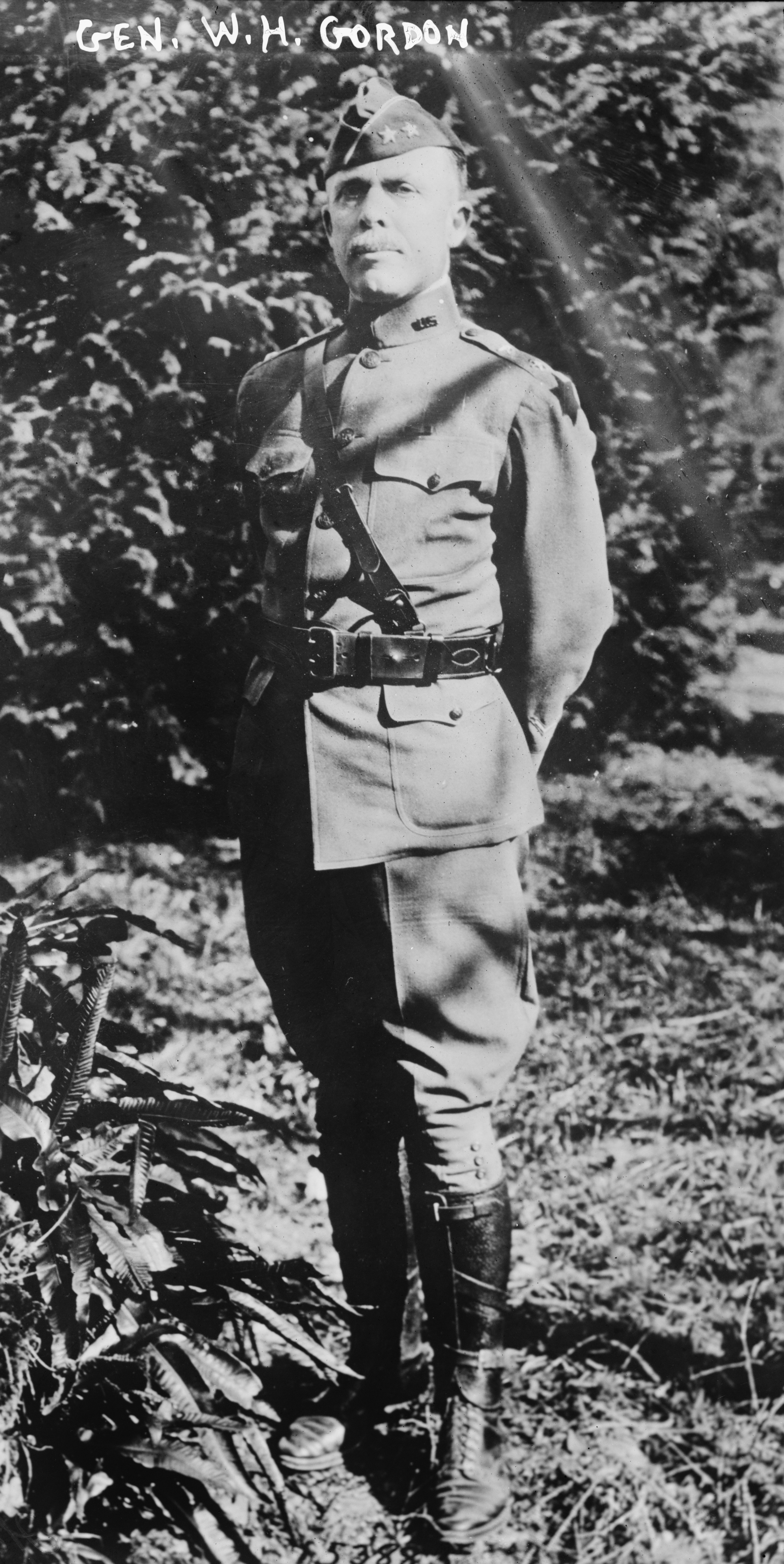
Major General Walter Henry Gordon in 1919.

Gordon was promoted to the temporary general officer rank of brigadier general on August 5, 1917. For his new rank, he was appointed commanding general (CG) Post and China Expedition and remained in that capacity for a month before being ordered back to the United States.

Following his return stateside, Gordon was appointed a depot brigade at Camp Meade, Maryland, and participated in the training of troops for deployment in France. In January 1918, he was ordered to the newly activated 5th Division, commanded by Major General John E. McMahon, one of Gordon's West Point classmates, at Camp Logan near Houston, Texas, and assumed command of the 5th Division's 10th Brigade. The brigade was composed of the 6th and 11th Infantry Regiments and the 15th Machine Gun Battalion.

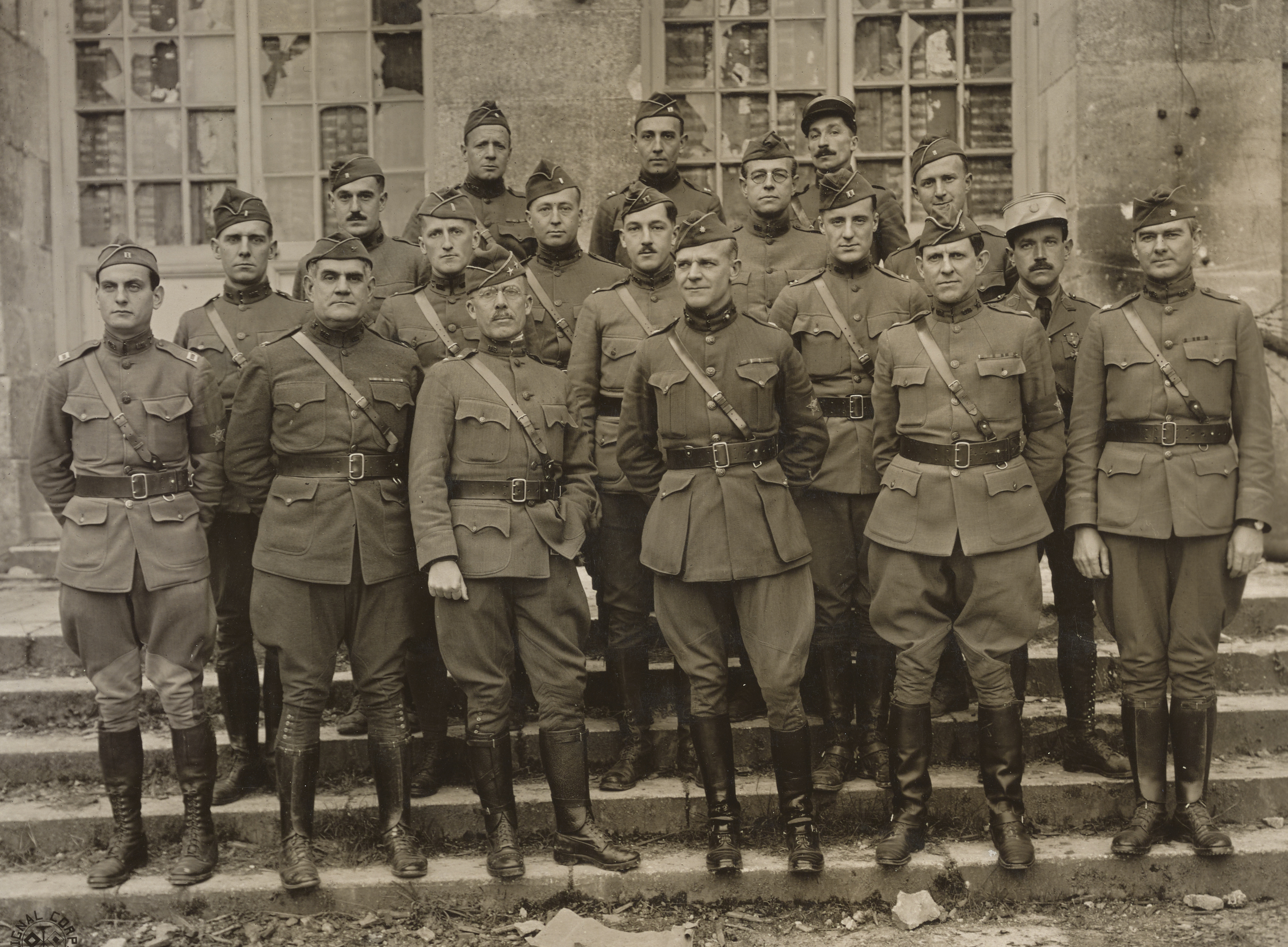
Major General Walter Henry Gordon, Commanding General 6th Division, along with members of his divisional staff, France, 18 November 1918.

After several weeks of training, Gordon and the 10th Brigade arrived in France in May and led his brigade during the intensive training in Bar-sur-Aube area. His brigade was ordered to the Vosges front in June that year and following a period of combat under the French 77th and 21st Divisions, Gordon's unit rejoined the 5th Division. Gordon then commanded his brigade during the Frapelle engagement in August before relinquishing command to Paul B. Malone.

After receiving a promotion to the command of major general on August 8, 1918, Gordon then assumed command of the 6th Division. Gordon led the division during combat in the Geradmer sector, September – October 1918.

Gordon then commanded the 6th Division during the Meuse–Argonne offensive, from Beauchamp Farm to Artaise, Stonne and Argonne Forest. Following the Armistice with Germany on November 11, 1918, Gordon's 6th Division was ordered first to the training area near Aignay-le-Duc and then participated in the occupation of the Rhineland with headquarters at Bad Bertrich until April 1919. For his service during World War I, Gordon was decorated with the Army Distinguished Service Medal and also received both the Legion of Honour and the Croix de Guerre with Palm by the Government of France. The citation for his Army DSM reads:

The President of the United States of America, authorized by Act of Congress, July 9, 1918, takes pleasure in presenting the Army Distinguished Service Medal to Major General Walter Henry Gordon, United States Army, for exceptionally meritorious and distinguished services to the Government of the United States, in a duty of great responsibility during World War I. As Brigade Commander of the 10th Infantry Brigade, 5th Division, General Gordon showed great energy and zeal in the conduct of his brigade during the major part of its maneuvers. Later, as Division Commander of the 6th Division, by his painstaking efforts, he brought his division to a marked state of efficiency, rendering services of great value to the American Expeditionary Forces.

== Postwar career ==
Gordon returned to the United States with his 6th Division in June 1919 and reverted to the peacetime rank of colonel, due to the huge downsizing of the armed forces after the war. He was then transferred to the Fort George Wright near Spokane, Washington, and assumed command of the 21st Infantry Regiment, but in October that year, Gordon was transferred to Washington, D.C., for duty in the Office of Inspector General of the Army under Major General John L. Chamberlain.

He was reappointed to the rank of brigadier general on July 3, 1920, and ordered to Fort Benning, Georgia for duty as commandant of the Army Infantry School. Gordon assumed additional duty as commanding general, Fourth Corps Area and also commanded 82nd Infantry Division (then part of the South Carolina Reserves). He held three command at the same time.

Gordon was promoted to the rank of major general on November 7, 1923, and transferred to the War Department General Staff in Washington, D.C., for duty with Special Board of Officers. He also served as temporary deputy chief of staff, but retired on his own request due to health problems on January 18, 1924, after 38 years of active duty.

Major general Walter H. Gordon died suddenly on April 26, 1924, aged 60, in Washington, D.C., and was buried with full military honors at Arlington National Cemetery, Virginia. He was survived by his wife Laura Doan Gordon (1859–1943).

== Decorations ==
Here is Major General Malone's ribbon bar:

1st Row	Army Distinguished Service Medal		
2nd Row	Indian Campaign Medal	Philippine Campaign Medal	World War I Victory Medal with two Battle Clasps
3rd Row	Army of Occupation of Germany Medal (Posthumously)	Legion of Honour, rank Officer	French Croix de guerre 1914–1918 with Palm

== See also ==
- USS General W. H. Gordon (AP-117)

Military offices
Preceded by James B. Erwin	Commanding General 6th Division; 1918–1919	Succeeded by Post deactivated
Preceded by John F. Morrison	Commanding General Fourth Corps Area; 1921–1922	Succeeded by David C. Shanks
Preceded by Charles S. Farnsworth	Commandant of the United States Army Infantry School; 1920–1923	Succeeded by Briant H. Wells
