= Peter E. Traub =

United States Army general (1864–1956)

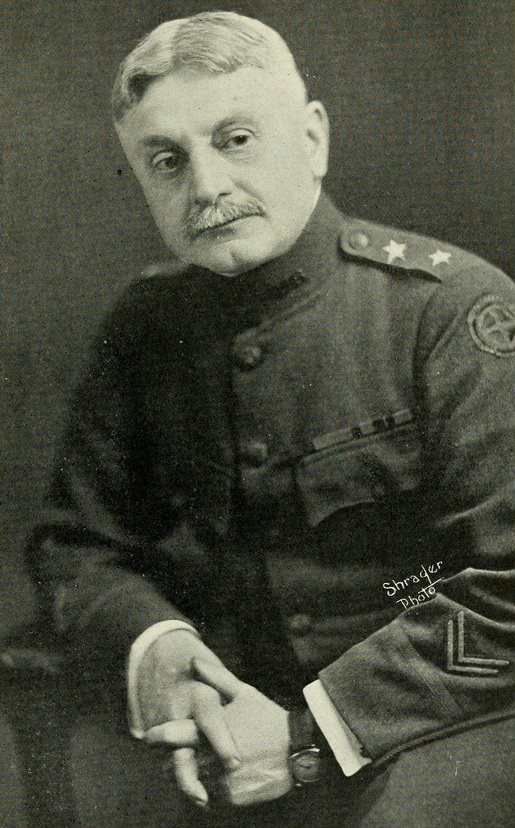
- Born: 15 October 1864; New York, New York, United States
- Died: 27 September 1956 (aged 91); Manchester, New Hampshire, United States
- Military career
- Allegiance: United States
- Branch: United States Army
- Service years: 1886–1928
- Rank: Major General
- Unit: Cavalry Branch
- Commands: 2nd Brigade; 41st Division; 35th Division; 51st Brigade
- Conflicts: Pine Ridge Campaign; Spanish–American War; Philippine–American War; World War I
- Awards: Silver Star; Purple Heart (2)

Major General Peter Edward Traub (15 October 1864 – 27 September 1956) was a United States Army officer who served in numerous conflicts during his long military career. During World War I he commanded the 51st Brigade and the 35th Division. After the Armistice of 11 November 1918, he assumed command of the 41st Division.

== Early life and academic career ==
Peter Edward Traub was born in New York City on September 27, 1864. He entered the United States Military Academy (USMA) at West Point, New York in September 1882. Almost four years later Traub graduated from there, 31st in a class of 77, in July 1886 and was commissioned as a cavalry officer in the United States Army. Many of his classmates at the academy rose to the rank of brigadier general or higher later in their military careers. For example: John J. Pershing, Avery D. Andrews, Chauncey B. Baker, Charles C. Ballou, Malvern H. Barnum, Jesse McI. Carter, George B. Duncan, William H. Hay, Arthur Johnson, Albert D. Kniskern, Edward M. Lewis, Frank McIntyre, John E. McMahon, James McRae, Charles T. Menoher, Henry C. Newcomer, Mason Patrick, Julius Penn, Benjamin A. Poore, Thomas H. Rees, Frank L. Winn, Walter Henry Gordon and Charles C. Walcutt Jr.

He returned to the USMA (also commonly known and referred to as West Point) in November 1892 to teach modern languages and, from August 1896 to June 1898, Traub served as an assistant professor of the French language. He later returned to West Point in October 1902 and wrote a textbook, Partial Course in English, for the cadets.

From December 1904 to July 1907, Traub taught modern languages for the Infantry and Cavalry School, Army Signal School and Army Staff College at Fort Leavenworth, Kansas. From July 1907 to August 1911, he served as an associate professor of modern languages at West Point.

== Military career ==
As a second lieutenant, Traub served with 1st Cavalry in Montana and Wyoming. In November 1890, he participated in two forced marches with Troop A to reach the Cave Hills in South Dakota during the Pine Ridge Campaign.

Promoted to first lieutenant in December 1892, Traub served with Troop G of the 1st Cavalry in Cuba during the Spanish–American War. He was later awarded the Silver Star for his actions at San Juan Hill on 1 July 1898, when he risked his life to try to help a mortally wounded trooper.

From December 1898 to October 1899, he served as an aide-de-camp to Major General Guy V. Henry. Traub was in Puerto Rico from January to May 1899 while General Henry served as military governor there.

From September 1900 to August 1902, Traub served in the Philippines with the 5th Cavalry. He was promoted to captain in February 1901. In April 1902, Traub arranged the surrender of an insurgent group.

Traub was promoted to major on 5 March 1911 and served in the Philippines again from October 1911 to March 1917. He commanded a squadron of the 7th Cavalry from October 1911 to September 1914. Traub received a temporary promotion to colonel in October 1914 and served as an assistant chief of the Philippine Constabulary and commander of the District of Mindanao and Sulu from October 1914 to March 1917. During this time, he was engaged in action against Moro outlaw bands. His temporary promotion to colonel was made permanent when Traub received a dual promotion first to lieutenant colonel and then to colonel on 1 July 1916.

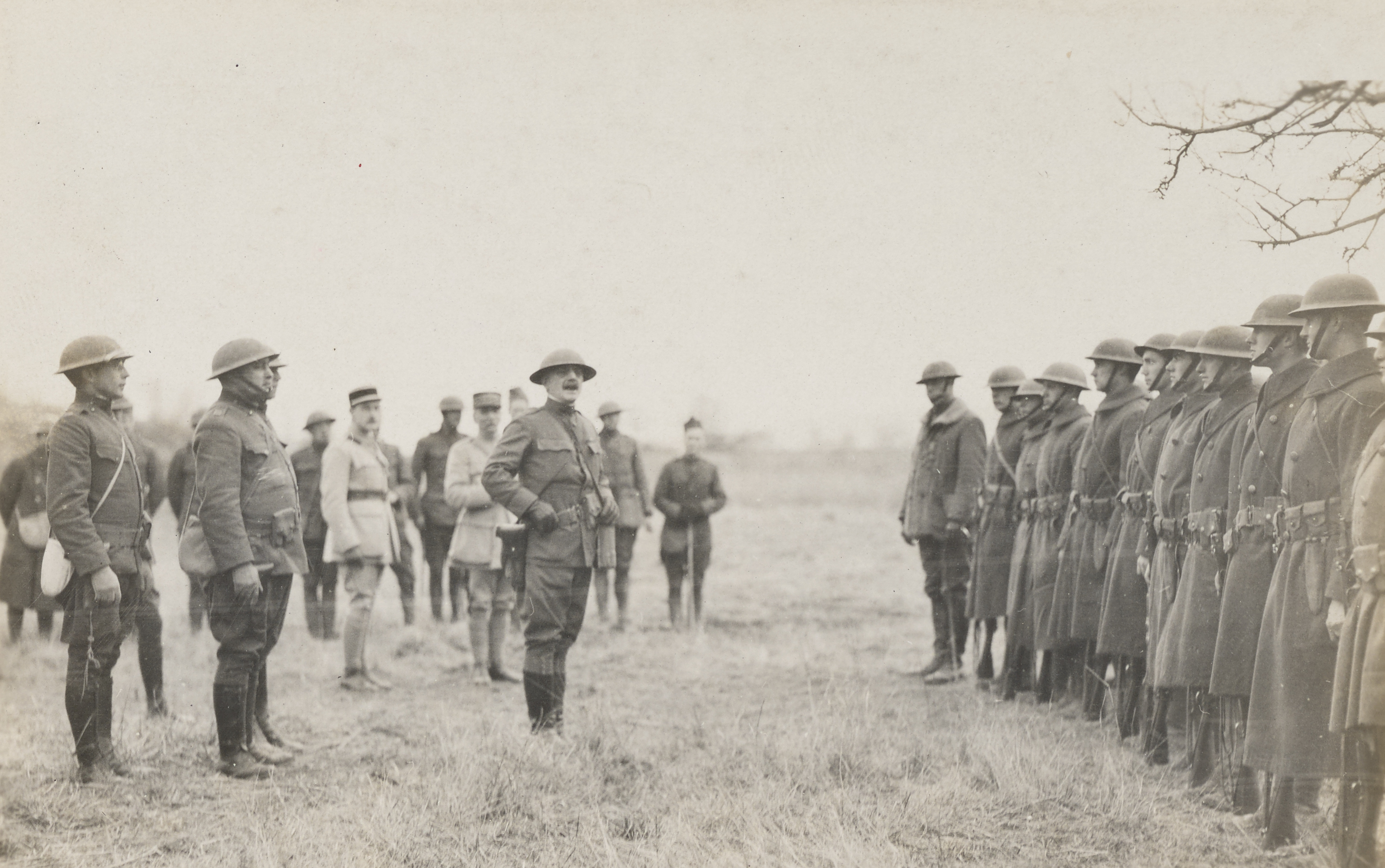
Brigadier General Peter E. Traub talking to doughboys under his command who made a big raid on the enemy's trenches, February 23, 1918.

In August 1917, four months after the American entry into World War I, Traub received a temporary promotion to brigadier general and assumed command of the 51st Infantry Brigade, 26th Division, an Army National Guard formation, in Boston. He travelled with his troops to France in September and continued their training there. They began combat operations in February 1918.

On 12 July, Traub accepted a temporary promotion to major general and then assumed command of the 35th Division, like the 26th another National Guard formation, on 20 July. His division was held in reserve during the Battle of St. Mihiel Salient, which took place in mid-September. Instead the 35th, under Traub's command, participated in the Meuse–Argonne offensive towards the end of the month, although it did not perform well in this, its first (and only) major engagement, with its command system falling apart and the division itself sustaining thousands of casualties, resulting in its relief from the battle after just a few days. He later received two Purple Hearts as the result of poison gas exposures during this period.

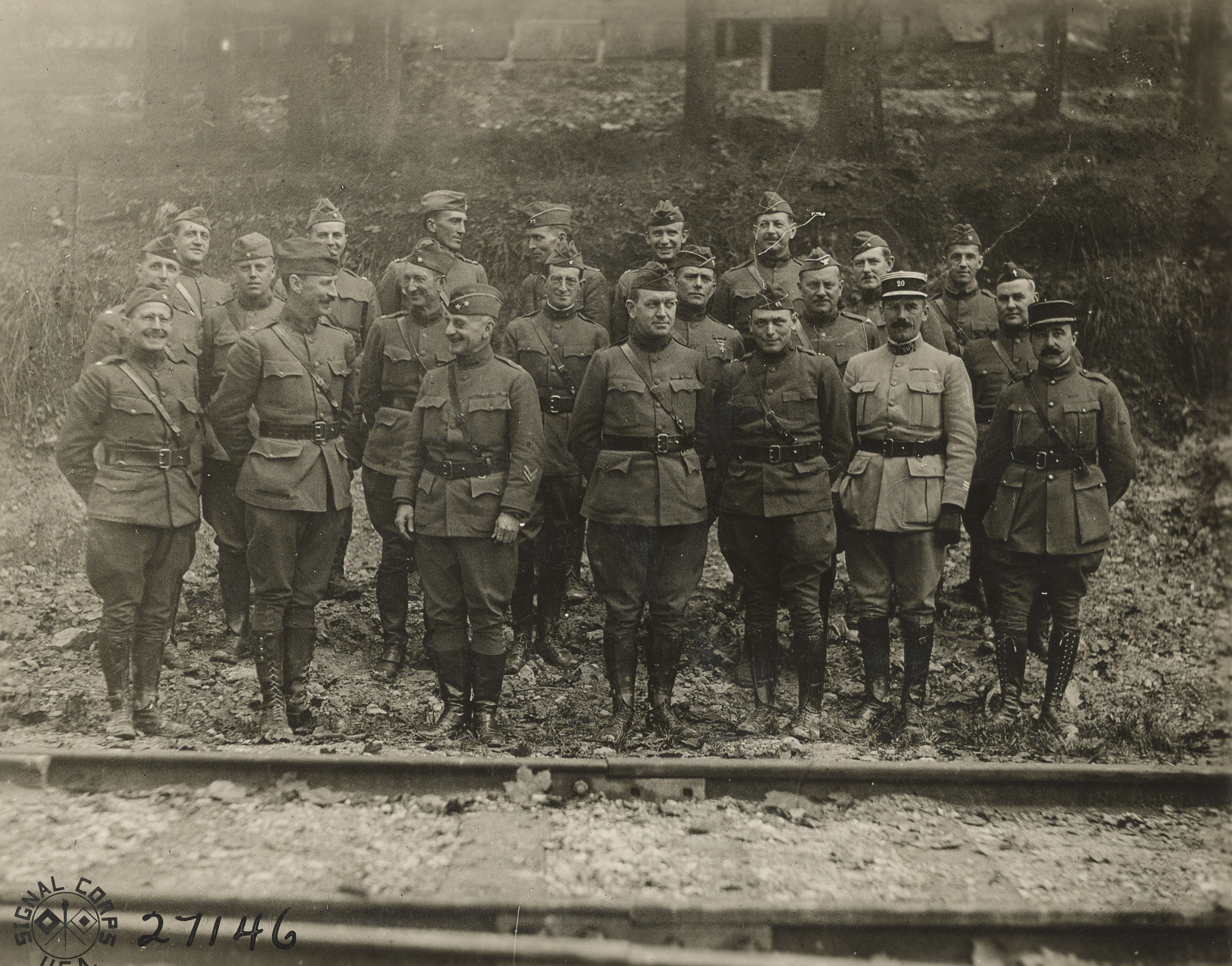
Major General Peter E. Traub and members of his divisional staff at Sommedieue, Meuse, France, October 21, 1918. To Traub's right is Colonel Hamilton S. Hawkins, the 35th's chief of staff.

In December 1918, shortly after the armistice with Germany, Traub relinquished command of the 35th Division and then assumed command of the 41st Division, a depot division. In February 1919, he returned to the United States with the division. In March, the 41st Division was demobilized at Fort Dix in New Jersey. Traub then assumed command of Camp Pike in Arkansas. On 30 June 1919, he was relieved of command and returned to his permanent rank of colonel.

After various staff and recruiting assignments, Traub was promoted again to brigadier general on 19 April 1928. From May to September 1928, he served as commanding general of the 2nd Infantry Brigade, 1st Division at Madison Barracks in New York. On 15 October 1928, Traub retired from active duty, having reached the mandatory retirement age of 64.

On 21 June 1930, due to an act of Congress, he was advanced to major general on the retired list.

== Family and later life ==
Traub married Katharine Hamilton Chapman (14 February 1867 – 27 November 1942) on 15 October 1895 in Albany, New York. They had three daughters and seven grandchildren.

After retirement, Traub and his wife settled in Augusta, Georgia. After her death, he moved to Peekskill, New York to be closer to his remaining family. After his death in Manchester, New Hampshire, he was buried at the West Point Cemetery on 4 October 1956.

== Bibliography ==
- Cooke, James J. (1997). Pershing and his Generals: Command and Staff in the AEF. Praeger Publishers. ISBN 0-275-95363-7.
- Davis, Henry Blaine Jr. (1998). Generals in Khaki. Raleigh, North Carolina: Pentland Press. ISBN 1571970886. OCLC 40298151.
- Venzon, Anne Cipriano (2013). The United States in the First World War: an Encyclopedia. Hoboken, NJ: Taylor and Francis. ISBN 978-1-135-68453-2. OCLC 865332376.

Military offices
Preceded by Nathaniel F. McClure	Commanding General 35th Division; July–December 1918	Succeeded by Thomas B. Dugan
Preceded by Eli K. Cole (last permanent commander)	Commanding General 41st Division; 1918–1919	Succeeded by Post deactivated
