= Francis K. Newcomer =

United States Army general

Francis Kosier Newcomer
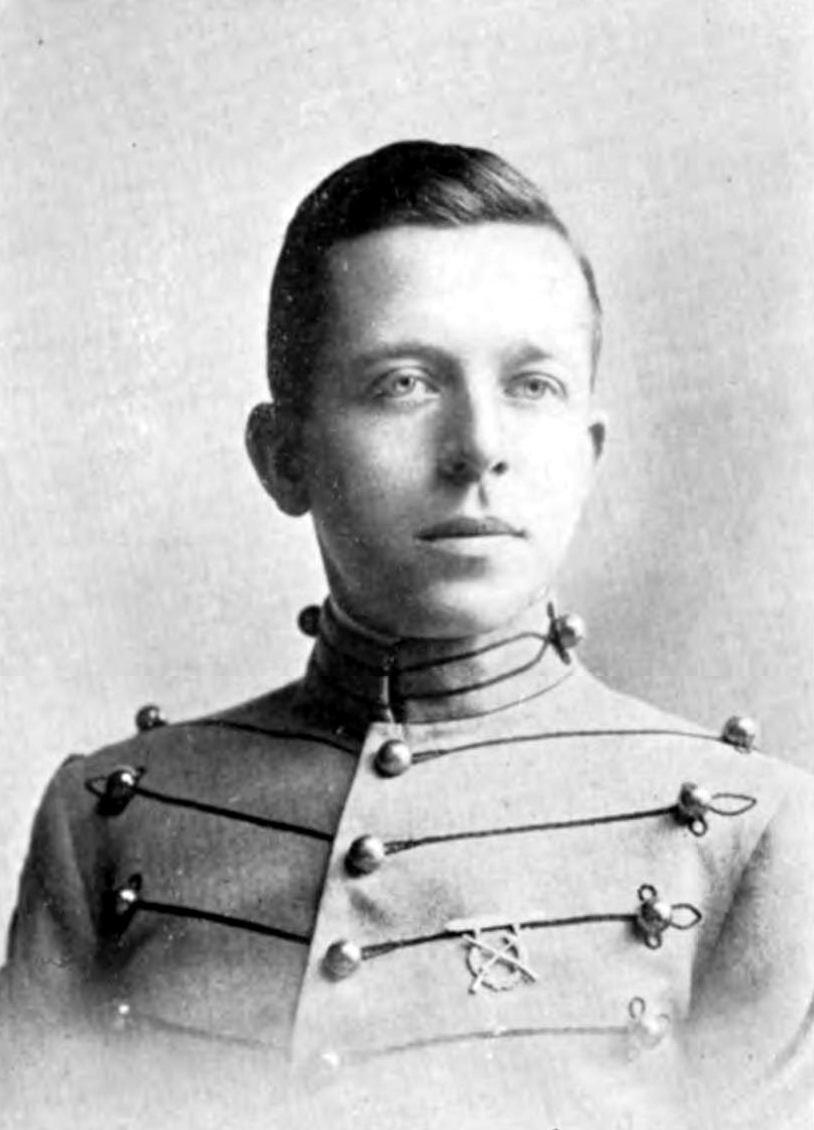
- Newcomer at West Point in 1913
- Born: September 14, 1889; Byron, Illinois, U.S.
- Died: August 16, 1967 (aged 77); Fort Sam Houston, Texas, U.S.
- Burial place: Arlington National Cemetery
- Relatives: Henry C. Newcomer (father)
- Military career
- Allegiance: United States
- Branch: United States Army
- Service years: 1913–1949
- Rank: Brigadier General
- Commands: Governor of the Panama Canal Zone; 1st Battalion, 3rd Engineers
- Conflicts: World War I; Battle of Fismes and Fismette; World War II
- Awards: Distinguished Service Cross; Legion of Merit

Francis Kosier Newcomer (September 14, 1889 – August 16, 1967) was an American military officer who served as Governor of the Panama Canal Zone from 1948 to 1952. He held the rank of brigadier general in the United States Army.

== Biography ==
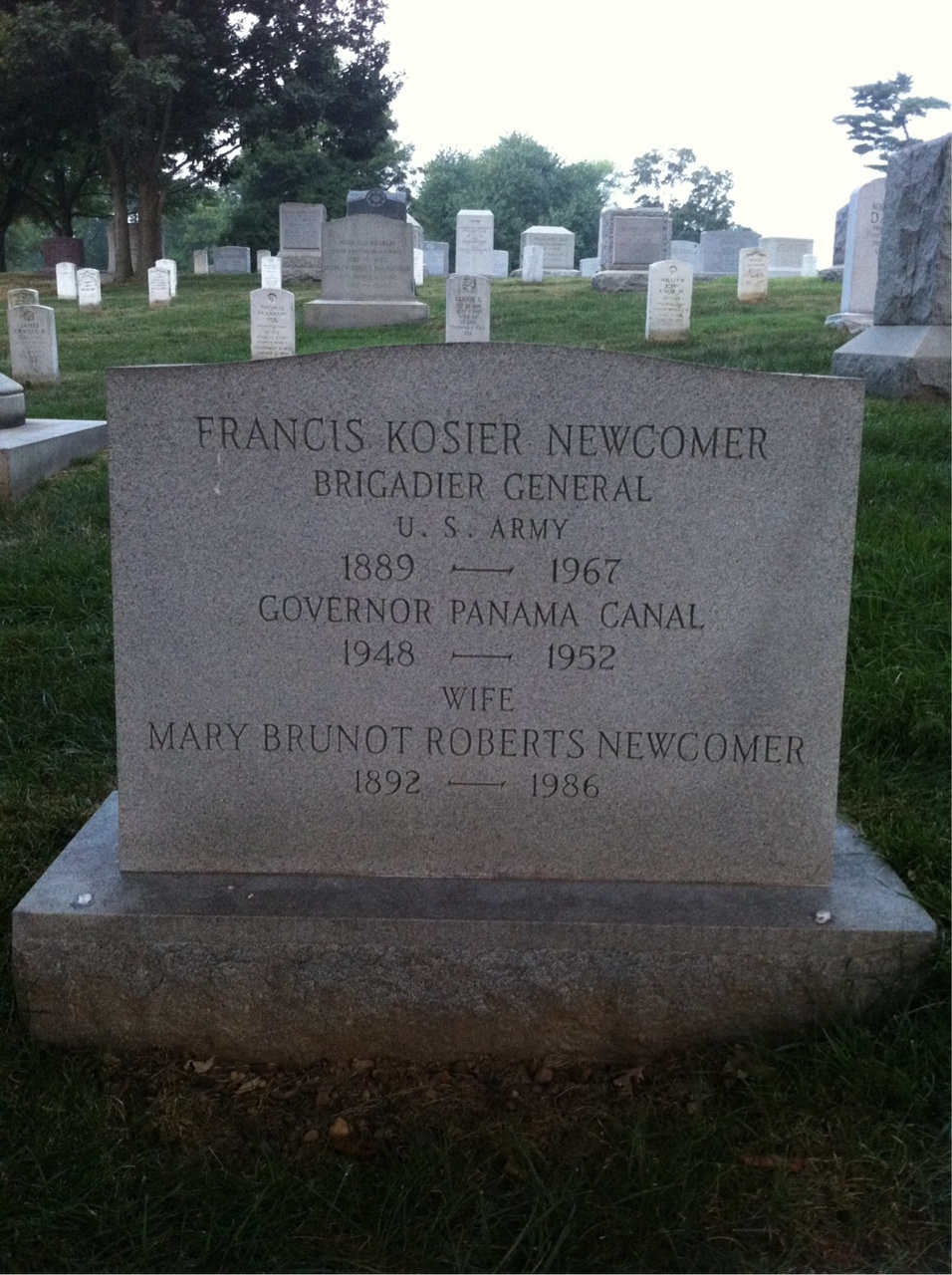
Newcomer's grave at Arlington National Cemetery

Francis Kosier Newcomer was born on September 14, 1889, in Byron, Illinois, as a son of Brigadier General Henry C. Newcomer and his wife Rebecca. He attended the United States Military Academy at West Point and graduated first in his class in June 1913. He was commissioned a second lieutenant in the U.S. Army Corps of Engineers on June 12, 1913.

His first assignment was with the 1st Engineer Battalion, which was stationed at Washington Barracks. Within this capacity, he was appointed to the local United States Engineering School from which he graduated in 1916.

During World War I, Newcomer served as a temporary lieutenant colonel with the 4th Engineers, 4th Division. He was awarded the Distinguished Service Cross for his bravery and leadership in the construction of a foot bridge over the Vesle river near Fismes while under fire on August 5, 1918.

Newcomer served as associate professor in the Department of Mathematics at West Point from August 1919 to August 1924. He later served in Hawaii from 1931 to 1933, commanding the 1st Battalion, 3rd Engineers at Schofield Barracks until July 1933.

Newcomer graduated from the Command and General Staff School in June 1935 and the Army War College in June 1940.

During World War II, Newcomer served as theater engineer for the China Burma India Theater at Chungking from February 1943 to March 1944, earning the Legion of Merit.

Newcomer received a temporary promotion to brigadier general on November 8, 1944. He served as Panama Canal maintenance engineer and lieutenant governor from 1944 to 1948. From 1948 to 1952, Newcomer served as Governor of the Panama Canal Zone. Having reached the mandatory retirement age of 60, he was retired as a colonel on September 30, 1949, and advanced back to brigadier general on the retired list the following day. Newcomer remained on active duty until he completed his term as governor in 1952.

Newcomer and his wife moved to San Antonio, Texas, in 1952. He died on August 16, 1967, in Brooke General Hospital at Fort Sam Houston, and was buried at Arlington National Cemetery.

== Decorations ==

1st Row	Distinguished Service Cross			
2nd Row	Legion of Merit	World War I Victory Medal with Aisne-Marne and Defensive battle clasps	Army of Occupation of Germany Medal	American Defense Service Medal
3rd Row	American Campaign Medal	Asiatic-Pacific Campaign Medal with two service stars	World War II Victory Medal	National Defense Service Medal

Preceded by Joseph C. Mehaffey	Governor of Panama Canal Zone; 1948–1952	Succeeded by John S. Seybold
