= Sierra Vista Municipal Airport =

Joint-use civil-military airport in Cochise County, Arizona

Sierra Vista Municipal Airport Libby Army Airfield
- IATA: FHU; ICAO: KFHU; FAA LID: FHU

Summary
- Airport type: Public / military
- Operator: City of Sierra Vista and United States Army
- Serves: Sierra Vista, Arizona
- Location: Fort Huachuca
- Elevation AMSL: 4,719 ft (1,438 m)
- Coordinates: 31°35′18″N 110°20′40″W

Map
- Location within Arizona Location within the United States

Runways
Direction	Length		Surface
Direction	ft	m	Surface
8/26	12,001	3,658	Concrete
12/30	5,366	1,636	Asphalt/concrete
3/21	4,285	1,306	Asphalt/concrete

Helipads
Number	Length		Surface
Number	ft	m	Surface
H1	40	12	Asphalt

Statistics (2006)
- Aircraft operations: 157,184
- Based aircraft: 118
- Source: Federal Aviation Administration

Sierra Vista Municipal Airport (IATA: FHU, ICAO: KFHU, FAA LID: FHU), a joint-use civil-military airport which shares facilities with Libby Army Airfield, is located on Fort Huachuca in Sierra Vista, a city and U.S. Army installation in Cochise County, Arizona, United States. The airport has two runways and one helipad. It is predominantly used for military aviation for the surrounding military base.

As per Federal Aviation Administration records, the airport had 1,304 passenger boardings (enplanements) in calendar year 2005 and 2,041 enplanements in 2006. According to the FAA's National Plan of Integrated Airport Systems for 2007–2011, Sierra Vista is a general aviation airport (the commercial service category requires at least 2,500 passenger boardings per year).

Libby Army Airfield is named in honor of Medal of Honor recipient George D. Libby.

== Historical airline service ==
The airport has seen scheduled commercial service to Tucson and Phoenix by at least ten commuter air carriers from the 1960s through 2007:

- Apache Airlines in the 1960s
- America West Airlines in the 1990s.
- Cochise Airlines in the 1970s
- Copper State Airlines 1980-1982
- Golden Airways 1981-1983
- Sierra Vista Aviation 1983-1987
- Golden Pacific Airlines 1987
- StatesWest Airlines 1989–1991. From mid-1990 through 1991 StatesWest operated as USAir Express on behalf of USAir.
- Mesa Airlines 1989–2002. From late 1992 through late 2002 Mesa operated as America West Express on behalf of America West Airlines.
- National Aircompany 2003-2004
- Great Lakes Airlines 2005–2007

The airport has not seen commercial service since Great Lakes Airlines ended on February 28, 2007.

== Facilities and aircraft ==
Sierra Vista Municipal/Libby Army Airfield has three runways and one helipad:

- Runway 8/26: 12,001 x 150 ft (3,658 x 46 m), surface: concrete
- Runway 12/30: 5,366 x 100 ft (1,636 x 30 m), surface: asphalt/concrete
- Runway 3/21: 4,285 x 75 ft (1,306 x 23 m), surface: asphalt/concrete
- Helipad H1: 40 x 40 ft (12 x 12 m), surface: asphalt

For the 12-month period ending December 31, 2006, the airport had 157,184 aircraft operations, an average of 430 per day: 74% military, 24% general aviation, 1% scheduled commercial and <1% air taxi. There are 118 aircraft based at this airport: 59% single engine, 24% military, 7% multi engine, 7% helicopters and 3% ultralights.

== Airline and destination ==
=== Cargo ===
Airlines	Destinations
Ameriflight	Phoenix-Sky Harbor

== Accidents and incidents ==
On January 1, 2015, a Cochise County Sheriff's Office helicopter crashed 20 miles north of the airport while returning to it after having maintenance work performed at the Phoenix area. Pilot and former police officer Jeff Steele and mechanic Marc Hansen, a pilot himself, were both killed.

== See also ==
- List of airports in Arizona
