= George D. Libby =

U.S. Medal of Honor recipient

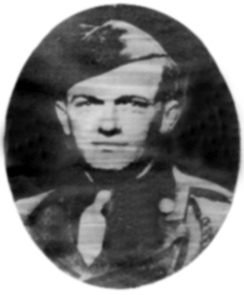
- Libby in 1950
- Born: 4 December 1919; Bridgton, Maine, United States
- Died: 20 July 1950 (aged 30); Near Taejon, Korea
- Burial place: Arlington National Cemetery
- Military career
- Allegiance: United States
- Branch: United States Army
- Service years: 1945–1950
- Rank: Sergeant
- Service number: 31153010
- Units: C Company, 3rd Engineer Combat Battalion, 24th Infantry Division
- Conflicts: World War II; Korean War: Battle of Taejon (DOW)
- Awards: Medal of Honor; Purple Heart

George Dalton Libby (4 December 1919 – 20 July 1950) was a soldier in the United States Army who was posthumously awarded the Medal of Honor for his actions on July 20, 1950 during the Korean War.

Serving with the 24th Infantry Division, Sergeant Libby was attempting to withdraw from Taejon after the Battle of Taejon when the truck he was riding in was disabled by North Korean fire. Libby exposed himself to enemy fire multiple times to help wounded soldiers, before using himself as a human shield to protect the driver of another truck as they broke through the North Korean forces. Shot multiple times, Libby died from blood loss, but was able to protect a truck full of wounded men until they escaped to allied lines. For this action, Libby was awarded the Medal of Honor.

== Early life ==
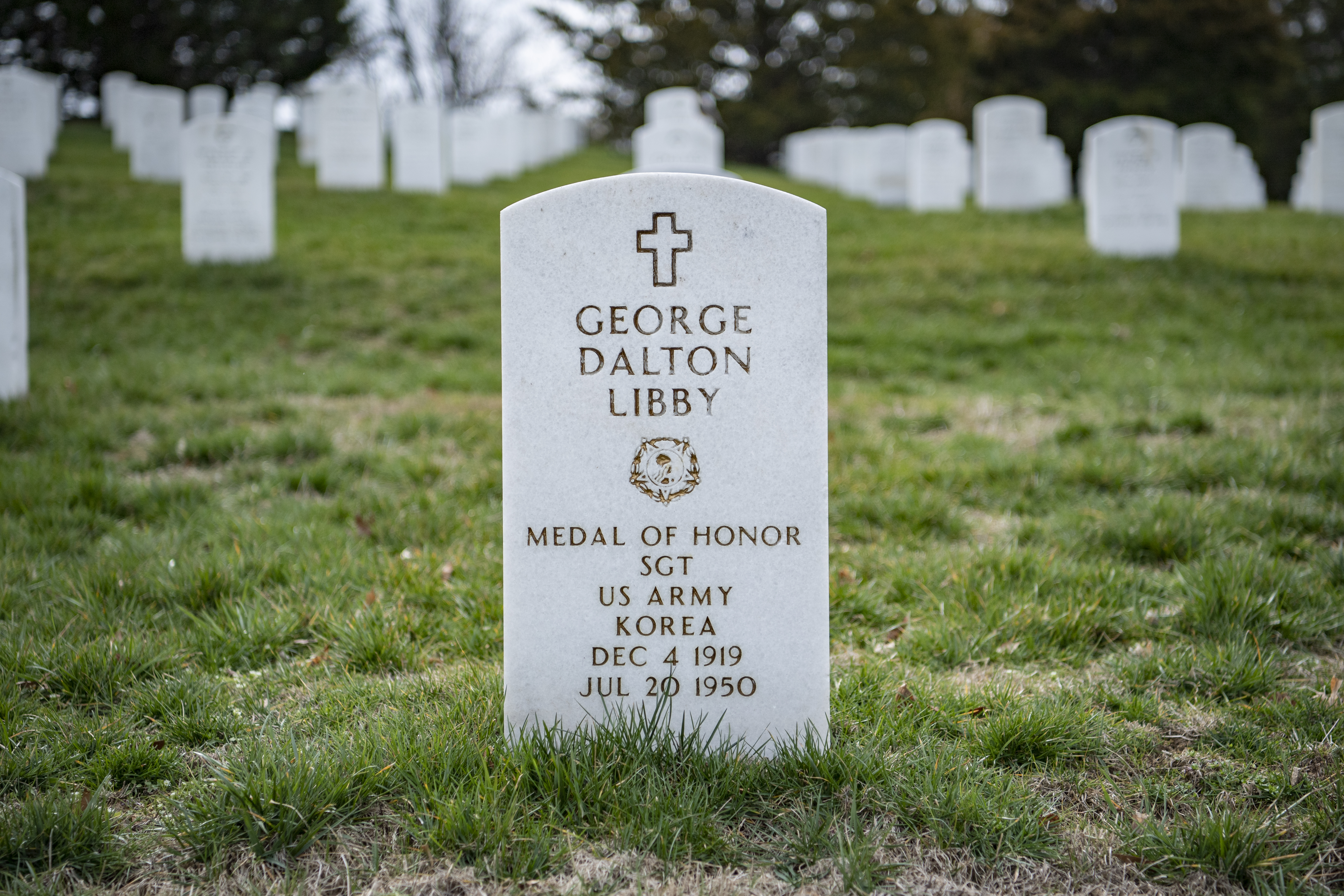
Libby's grave at Arlington National Cemetery

George Dalton Libby was born on 4 December 1919 in Bridgton, Maine. He enlisted in the United States Army in Waterbury, Connecticut.

Libby fought in World War II in the European Theatre of Operations.

== Korean War ==
By the time of the outbreak of the Korean War, Libby was a sergeant and had been assigned to C Company of the 3rd Engineer Battalion, 24th Infantry Division.

On 20 July 1950, the 24th Infantry Division was attempting to withdraw from the city of Taejon, South Korea, after having been badly beaten by the North Korean Korean People's Army (KPA) in the Battle of Taejon. By nightfall, the last remaining elements of the division were attempting to leave the town for Taegu. Libby was aboard a truck to the east of town attempting to evacuate when it reached a KPA roadblock. The KPA there ambushed the truck, disabling it and killing or wounding everyone aboard except Libby with gunfire.

Libby disembarked from the damaged truck, taking cover in a ditch and returning fire. During this fight, Libby twice exposed himself to fire to run across the road to assist other wounded soldiers. After rendering medical aid to the wounded, and pulling them out of the line of fire, Libby then stopped a passing M5 Half-track which was towing a 105 mm howitzer and loaded them onto it. Libby then took a position on the outside of the truck, protecting the driver with his own body and again exposing himself to fire, as he was the only unwounded soldier capable of carrying a weapon,

Having the vehicle stop several times to load more wounded onto it, Libby continued to fire his M2 Carbine at the KPA they encountered as they attempted to escape. Libby was struck several times in the body and arms by bullets as they broke through the first roadblock. At a second roadblock, Libby was struck again by gunfire. Too weak to hold his weapon, Libby pulled himself to an erect position in order to be a human shield for the driver until they were out of the range of enemy fire. Libby eventually collapsed and died from blood loss, but his actions allowed the truck full of wounded men to reach safety.

On 2 August 1951, the army posthumously awarded the Medal of Honor to Libby.

== Medal of honor citation ==
Libby was one of the first two soldiers to be awarded the Medal of Honor during the Korean War, the other being 24th Infantry Division commander Major General William F. Dean, who was captured in the same evacuation.

Sgt. Libby distinguished himself by conspicuous gallantry and intrepidity above and beyond the call of duty in action. While breaking through an enemy encirclement, the vehicle in which he was riding approached an enemy roadblock and encountered devastating fire which disabled the truck, killing or wounding all the passengers except Sgt. Libby. Taking cover in a ditch Sgt. Libby engaged the enemy and despite the heavy fire crossed the road twice to administer aid to his wounded comrades. He then hailed a passing M-5 artillery tractor and helped the wounded aboard. The enemy directed intense small-arms fire at the driver, and Sgt. Libby, realizing that no one else could operate the vehicle, placed himself between the driver and the enemy thereby shielding him while he returned the fire. During this action he received several wounds in the arms and body. Continuing through the town the tractor made frequent stops and Sgt. Libby helped more wounded aboard. Refusing first aid, he continued to shield the driver and return the fire of the enemy when another roadblock was encountered. Sgt. Libby received additional wounds but held his position until he lost consciousness. Sgt. Libby's sustained, heroic actions enabled his comrades to reach friendly lines. His dauntless courage and gallant self-sacrifice reflect the highest credit upon himself and uphold the esteemed traditions of the U.S. Army.

== Awards and decorations ==

| 1st row | Medal of Honor | | Purple Heart |
| 2nd row | Army Good Conduct Medal | American Campaign Medal | European-African-Middle Eastern Campaign Medal |
| 3rd row | World War II Victory Medal | Army of Occupation Medal with 'Germany' clasp | National Defense Service Medal |
| 4th row | Korean Service Medal with 1 Campaign star | United Nations Service Medal Korea | Korean War Service Medal Retroactively Awarded, 2003 |
| Unit awards | Presidential Unit Citation | | Korean Presidential Unit Citation |

== Memorial ==
On 4 July 1953, US Army built the bridge across the Imjin River and this bridge was named as 'Libby Bridge (리비교)' in honor of him. Additionally, Libby Field at Fort Huachuca, Arizona, is named in his honor.

== See also ==
- List of Korean War Medal of Honor recipients
