= USS General C. C. Ballou =

US Navy transport ship during World War II

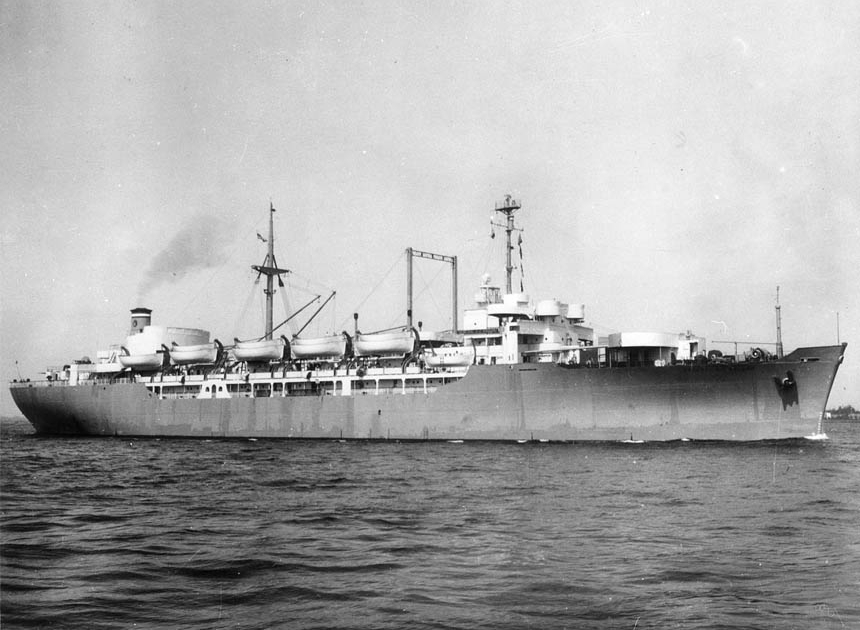
- USAT General C. C. Ballou underway, circa in 1949

History

United States
- Name: General C. C. Ballou
- Namesake: Charles Clarendon Ballou
- Builder: Kaiser Co., Inc.; Richmond, California
- Laid down: date unknown
- Launched: 7 March 1945
- Acquired: 20 May 1945
- Commissioned: 30 June 1945
- Decommissioned: 17 May 1946
- In service: after May 1946 (Army); 1 March 1950 (MSTS)
- Out of service: 1 March 1950 (Army); September 1954 (MSTS)
- Renamed: Brooklyn, 1969; Humacao, 1975; Eastern Light, 1981
- Reclassified: T-AP-157, 1 March 1950
- Stricken: 1 July 1960
- Identification: IMO number: 6903149
- Fate: Scrapped at Kaohsiung, Taiwan

General characteristics
- Class & type: General G. O. Squier-class transport ship
- Displacement: 9,950 tons (light), 17,250 tons (full)
- Length: 522 ft 10 in (159.36 m)
- Beam: 71 ft 6 in (21.79 m)
- Draft: 24 ft (7.32 m)
- Propulsion: single-screw steam turbine with 9,900 shp (7,400 kW)
- Speed: 17 knots (31 km/h)
- Capacity: 3,823 troops
- Complement: 356 (officers and enlisted)
- Armament: 4 × 5"/38 caliber gun mounts; 4 × 40 mm AA gun mounts; 16 × 20 mm AA gun mounts

USS General C. C. Ballou (AP-157) was a General G. O. Squier-class transport ship for the U.S. Navy in World War II. She was named in honor of U.S. Army general Charles Clarendon Ballou. She was transferred to the U.S. Army as USAT General C. C. Ballou in 1946. On 1 March 1950, she was transferred to the Military Sea Transportation Service (MSTS) as USNS General C. C. Ballou (T-AP-157). She was later sold for commercial operation under several names before being scrapped some time after 1981.

== Operational history ==
General C. C. Ballou, (AP-157) was launched 7 March 1945 under Maritime Commission contract (MC #714) by Kaiser Co., Inc., Yard 3, Richmond, California; sponsored by Mrs. Harry J. Bernat; acquired by the Navy 20 May 1945; and commissioned 30 June 1945.

Following shakedown off San Diego, General C. C. Ballou departed San Pedro 29 July 1945 for France via the Panama Canal. She arrived Marseilles after the Japanese surrender, and sailed with returning veterans 23 August bound for Hampton Roads. Then after two round-trip voyages to India and back to New York with returning soldiers and sailors, the ship sailed 13 January 1946 for a voyage that was to take her around the world visiting Calcutta, Manila, and other ports before mooring at San Francisco 8 March with over 3,000 troops. General C. C. Ballou completed her voyage by transiting the Panama Canal, arriving New York via San Juan, Puerto Rico 1 May. The transport decommissioned at Hoboken, New Jersey, 17 May, was returned to the Maritime Commission, and eventually served as a transport for Army Transportation Service.

On 5 April 1949, USAT General C. C. Ballou departed Naples with 859 displaced persons from Europe for resettlement in Australia arriving 29 April 1949 at Melbourne. The General C. C. Ballou departed Europe and arrived at Pier 21 in Halifax on 24 December 1949, and thrice thereafter between 1950 and 1951. She completed another voyage to Sydney on 23 March 1950 with 1266 more refugees.

General C. C. Ballou was reacquired by the Navy 1 March 1950 for MSTS and for nearly 2 years sailed between Europe and the United States with refugees. Beginning in 1952, the ship began transporting troops from the West Coast to Korea to serve in the Korean War. Following the armistice, General C. C. Ballou continued to sail to Japan and Korea on troop rotation duty. She was placed out of service in September 1954 and placed in reserve at Orange, Texas. Later delivered to the Maritime Commission National Defense Reserve Fleet at Beaumont, Texas, she was struck from the Navy List 1 July 1960, and remained in reserve until sold for commercial use under the MARAD Ship Exchange Program in 1968 to Sea-Land Service, Inc. of Wilmington, Delaware.

The ship was rebuilt as an 11,369 gross ton container ship by the Bethlehem Steel Corporation Ship Repair Yard in Hoboken, New Jersey after being gutted by the Alabama Shipbuilding & Drydock Co. and renamed SS Brooklyn, USCG ON 513557, IMO 6903149. In 1975 the ship was sold to Navieras de Puerto Rico, also known as the Puerto Rico Maritime Shipping Authority and renamed SS Humacao. Eastern Star Maritime Ltd. of Panama renamed her Eastern Light when it purchased her in 1981. Eastern Light left Kobe, Japan on 24 December 1981 to steam to Kaohsiung, Taiwan where she was scrapped.

General C. C. Ballou received five battle stars for Korean War service.

== Sources ==
- Cudahy, Brian J. (2006). Box Boats: How Container Ships Changed the World. Fordham University Press. ISBN 978-0-8232-2569-9.
- Williams, Greg H. (2013). World War II U.S. Navy Vessels in Private Hands. McFarland Books. ISBN 978-0-7864-6645-0.
