= 3rd Engineer Battalion (United States) =

3rd Engineer Battalion, 3rd Brigade, 1st Cavalry Division
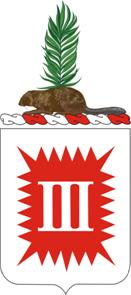
- Insignia
- Active: 1901–1970; 1975–1996; 2013–present
- Country: United States
- Branch: United States Army Corps of Engineers
- Size: Battalion
- Part of: 3rd Brigade, 1st Cavalry Division, III Armored Corps, FORSCOM
- Installation: Fort Hood, Texas
- Nickname: "Builders"
- Colors: Scarlet and white
- Mascot: Beaver

The 3rd Engineer Battalion is a unit of the United States Army that deploys to designated contingency areas and conducts combat and/or stability operations in support of a brigade combat team. It is composed of two combat engineer companies, one signal, one military intelligence, and a headquarters company. Its mission is to provide assured mobility, counter-mobility, general engineering, survivability support, military intelligence, and connectivity support to deploy anywhere at any time. The unit has a history dating to 1901.

== Symbolism ==
The battalion's insignia was approved 11 February 1921. It consists of a white shield with the Roman numeral III and a splash of red with an indented border of gold. The crest that sits on the shield consists of a wreath of the same colors with a beaver crouched at the foot of a palm branch. The beaver is the symbol of New York and nature's engineer, the palm branch represents tropical service, the red and white are the engineer colors and the indented border alludes to the work of the engineers in constructing field fortifications.

== Unit history ==
The 3rd BEB was initially organized as the 3rd Battalion of Engineers on 25 March 1901, at Fort Totten, New York. On 1 July 1916, the battalion was reorganized as the 3rd Engineer Regiment, with portions serving in the Philippines, Hawaii, and Panama.

In April 1921, the regiment assembled in Hawaii and became the engineer component of the Hawaiian Division; the 3rd Engineers did most of the military construction on the island of Oahu.

In July 1950, the battalion moved to Korea to serve in the Korean War with the 24th Infantry Division. The 3rd Engineer Battalion was responsible for improving most major thoroughfares and bridging most rivers in Korea. The battalion stayed in Korea until November 1953. The 3rd Engineer Battalion remained assigned to the 24th Infantry Division at Fort Stewart, Georgia. It deployed with the division in 1990 for Operations Desert Shield/Desert Storm, as well as with the 10th Mountain Division to Somalia in 1993. The 3rd Engineer Battalion has also served in Germany, Lebanon, Poland, Finland, Bulgaria, Kuwait, Iraq, and Syria.

== See also ==
- George D. Libby
