= Charles Clarendon Ballou =

United States Army general

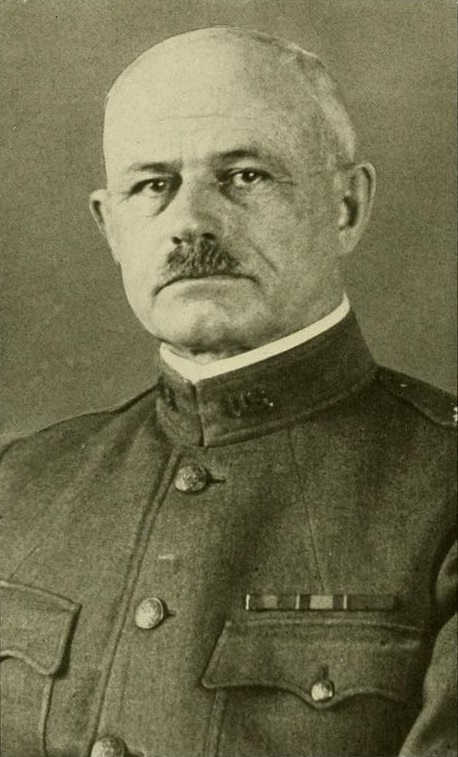
- Ballou as commander of the 163rd Depot Brigade in World War I
- Born: June 13, 1862; Orange, New York, U.S.
- Died: July 3, 1928 (aged 66); Spokane, Washington, U.S.
- Burial place: West Point Cemetery
- Military career
- Allegiance: United States
- Branch: United States Army
- Service years: 1886–1926
- Rank: Major General
- Service number: 0-178
- Unit: Infantry Branch
- Commands: 92nd Division; 86th Division
- Conflicts: World War I

Charles Clarendon Ballou (June 13, 1862 – July 23, 1928) was a United States Army officer who attained the rank of major general during World War I.

== Early life ==
Ballou was born in Orange, New York. He graduated number sixty-three of seventy-seven in the class of 1886 from the United States Military Academy. John J. Pershing was among his fellow classmates.

== Military career ==
Upon graduation, Ballou was commissioned in the Sixteenth Infantry and was on frontier duty in the Far West. He was part of the Sioux Campaign of 1890 and 1891. From 1891 to 1893, Ballou was Professor of Military Science and Tactics at Florida State Agriculture College.

During 1897 and 1898, he went to the Infantry and Cavalry School. From July 8 to October 20, 1898, he was a major in the Seventh Illinois Volunteer Infantry. He was then regimental quartermaster in the Philippines in 1899, where he participated in the battle of Zapote River.

He attended the Field Officers School in 1916 and the Army War College in 1916 and 1917.

Ballou was promoted to brigadier general of the National Army in August 1917 after which he was made a major general on November 28. He commanded the 92nd Infantry Division from October 27, 1917 to November 18, 1918. From November 19 to February 1, Ballou commanded the 86th Division.

Ballou retired in 1926 as a colonel with forty years of service.

== Awards ==
Ballou's decorations included a Silver Star Citation, as well as the Croix de Guerre with palm and the Legion of Honor from France.

== Personal ==
Ballou married Cora May Hendrick on June 30, 1886 in Hornby, New York. Their daughter Julia Bertha Ballou was a painter of portraits and Western American Art. Their son Charles Nelson Senn Ballou briefly attended West Point and then joined the Army, retiring as a colonel after World War II.

== Death and legacy ==
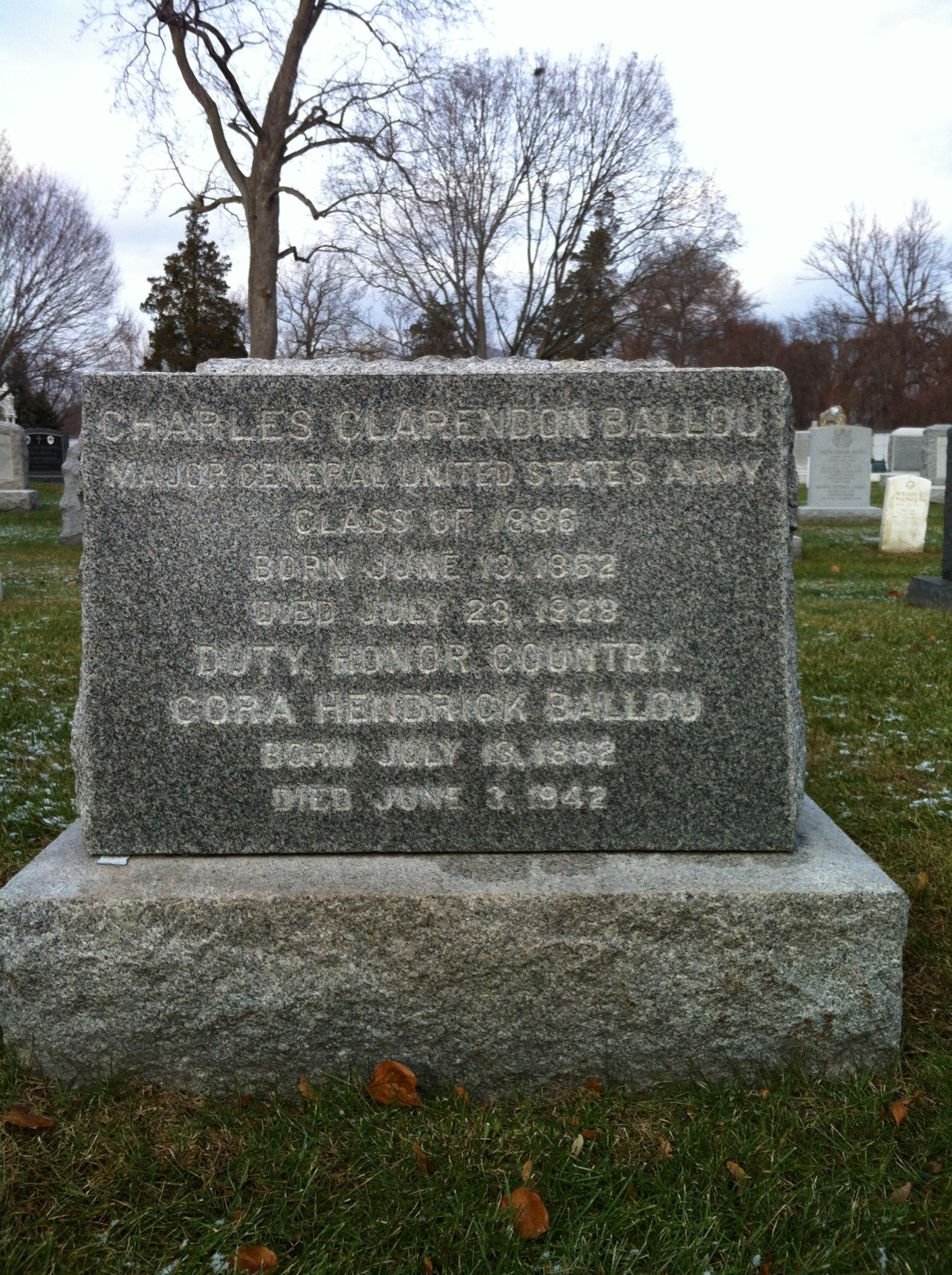
The grave of Major General Charles C. Ballou at West Point cemetery.

Charles Clarendon Ballou died at the age of sixty-six on July 23, 1928. His rank of major general was restored by act of Congress in June 1930. He was originally buried at the Fort George Wright Cemetery in Spokane, Washington, but his remains were moved to the West Point Cemetery in 1931.

The USS General C. C. Ballou (AP-157), a General G. O. Squier-class transport ship used during World War II, was named after him.

== Bibliography ==
- Cooke, James J. (1997). Pershing and his Generals: Command and Staff in the AEF. Praeger Publishers. ISBN 0-275-95363-7.
- Coffman, Edward M. (1998). The War to End All Wars: The American Military Experience in World War. University Press of Kentucky. ISBN 978-0-8131-0955-8.
- Davis, Henry Blaine Jr. (1998). Generals in Khaki. Raleigh, North Carolina: Pentland Press. ISBN 1571970886. OCLC 40298151.
- Farwell, Byron. 1999. Over there: the United States in the Great War, 1917-1918. New York: Norton. ISBN 9780393046984 OCLC 39478133
- Marquis Who's Who, Inc. Who Was Who in American History, the Military. Chicago: Marquis Who's Who, 1975. ISBN 0837932017 OCLC 657162692
- Venzon, Anne Cipriano (2013). The United States in the First World War: an Encyclopedia. Hoboken, NJ: Taylor and Francis. ISBN 978-1-135-68453-2. OCLC 865332376.
