= Chauncey Brooke Baker =

United States Army general

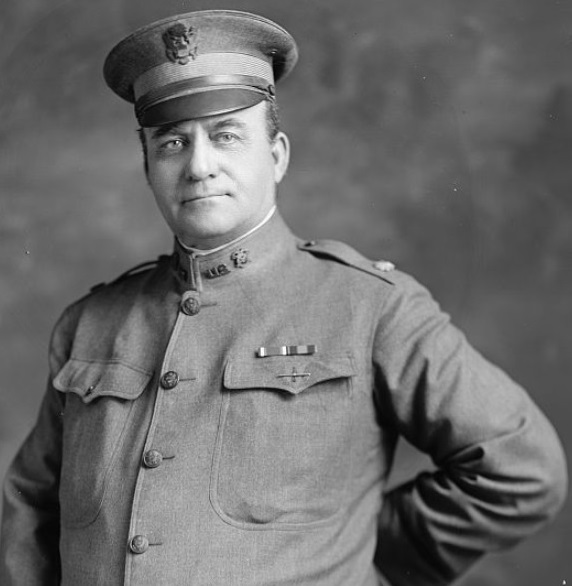
- Baker as a lieutenant colonel, c. 1916. Harris & Ewing photo.
- Born: August 26, 1860; Lancaster, Ohio, U.S.
- Died: October 18, 1936 (aged 76); Washington, D.C., U.S.
- Burial place: Arlington National Cemetery
- Spouse(s): Lucy McCook (d. 1923); Ella Turner (d. 1932); Emily Burr
- Relatives: Alexander McDowell McCook (Father in law)
- Military career
- Allegiance: United States
- Branch: United States Army
- Service years: 1886–1921
- Rank: Brigadier General
- Service number: 0-137
- Unit: United States Army Quartermaster Corps
- Commands: Chief of Embarkation Service
- Conflicts: World War I

Chauncey Brooke Baker (August 26, 1860 – October 18, 1936) was an American army officer and Brigadier general active during World War I.

== Early life ==
Baker was born in Lancaster, Ohio. He attended the United States Military Academy and graduated number forty-one of seventy-seven in the class of 1886. He also attended the Infantry and Cavalry School at Fort Leavenworth, in Kansas where he graduated with honor in 1889.

== Career ==
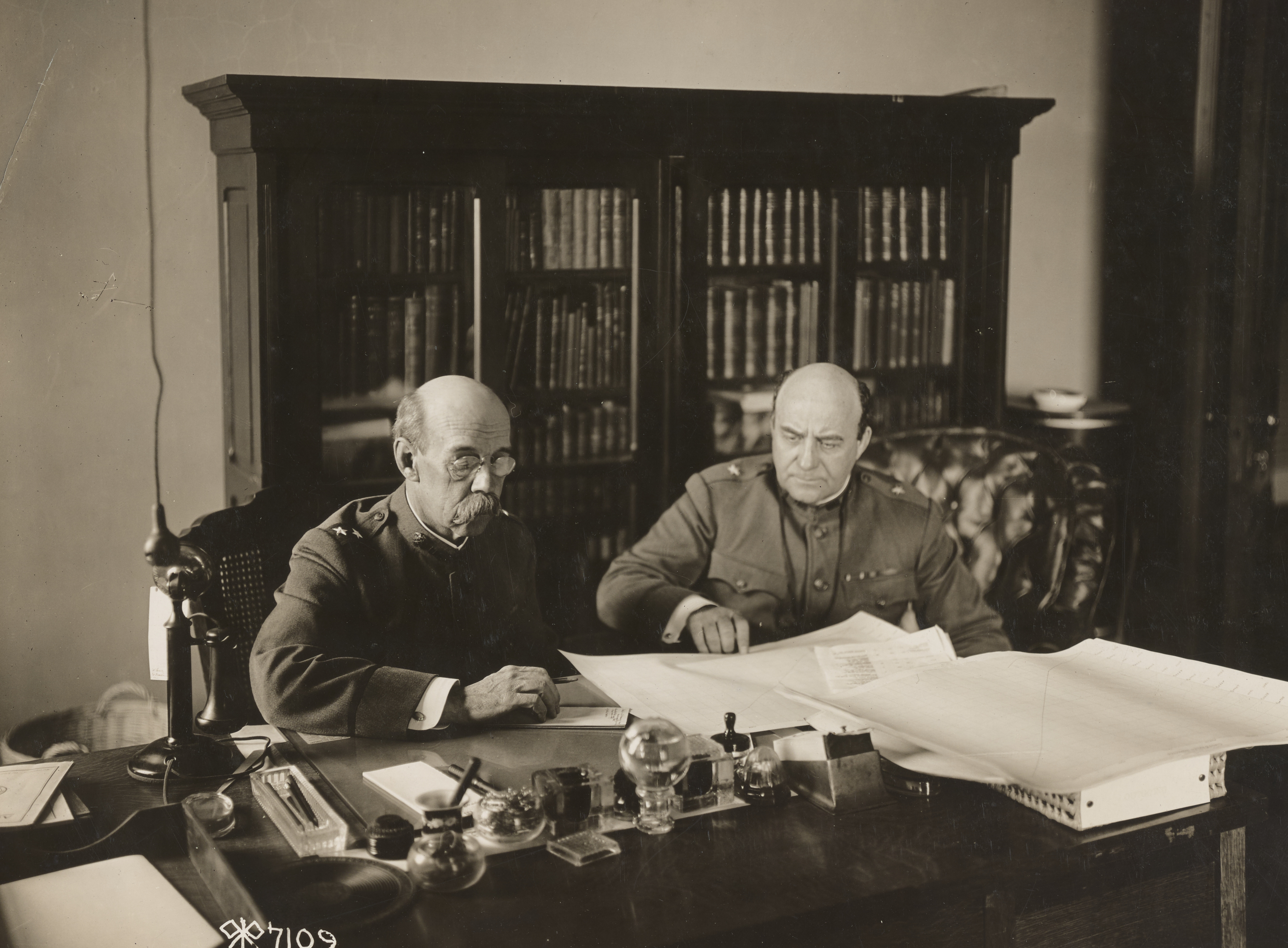
Major General Henry G. Sharpe and Brigadier General Chauncey B. Baker, both members of the War Council, March 28, 1918.

Baker was aide to General Alexander McDowell McCook from 1890 to 1895 as well as serving on frontier duty from 1886 to 1898. He was a depot quartermaster in Havana from August 1900 to May 1902.

He then served in the office of the Quartermaster General from 1914 to 1916.

He was senior member of the military commission to France in July 1917 and promoted to brigadier general of the National Army. Soon after his promotion, he became Chief of Embarkation Service for the office of the Chief of Staff in the War Department where he served until February 1918. In April 1921, he retired as a colonel.

Baker authored at least four books, including:

- Notes of Fire Tactics, 1889
- Transportation of Troops and Materiel, 1905. OCLC 4374356
- Handbook of Transportation by Rail and Commercial Vessels, 1916. OCLC 4456237
- Coordination Between Transportation Companies and the Military Service, 1916.
- Motor Transportation for the Army: A Lecture Delivered Before the Officers of the Quartermaster Reserve Corps at Washington, D.C., on May 29, 1917. Washington [D.C.]: G.P.O., 1917. OCLC 17690893

== Death and legacy ==
Chauncey Brooke Baker died in Washington, D.C., on October 18, 1936. He was buried at Arlington National Cemetery, Section 3, site 1927.

== Bibliography ==
- Davis, Henry Blaine Jr. Generals in Khaki. Raleigh, NC: Pentland Press, 1998. ISBN 1571970886 OCLC 231779136
- Marquis Who's Who, Inc. Who Was Who in American History, the Military. Chicago: Marquis Who's Who, 1975. ISBN 0837932017 OCLC 657162692
