= Arthur Johnson (United States Army officer) =

American general

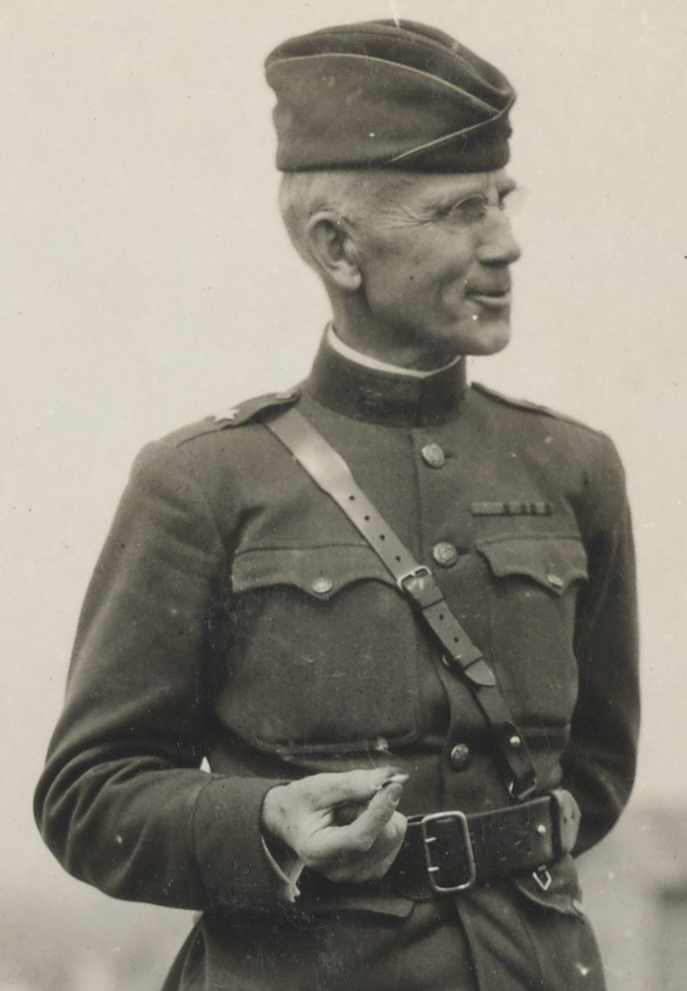
- Born: July 9, 1861; Swan Lake, Minnesota, United States
- Died: February 3, 1946 (aged 84); Wilmette, Illinois, United States
- Military career
- Allegiance: United States
- Branch: United States Army
- Service years: 1891–1925
- Rank: Brigadier General
- Unit: Infantry Branch
- Commands: 41st Infantry Regiment; Intermediate Section, Service of Supply; 36th Infantry Regiment; 3rd Texas Infantry Regiment (Acting); Battalion, 22nd Infantry; Battalion, 19th Infantry; Company, 13th Infantry
- Conflicts: Spanish–American War; Philippine–American War; World War I
- Awards: Army Distinguished Service Medal; Silver Star

Brigadier General Arthur Johnson (July 9, 1861 – February 3, 1946) was a United States Army officer who served during World War I.

== Early life and education ==
Arthur Johnson was born on July 9, 1861 to Swan Johnson and Margaret Elizabeth Nelson Johnson on a farm near Swan Lake, Minnesota. His birth location and home town is listed as St. Peter, Minnesota on other records. He had one brother, Franklin Oliver Johnson, who also served as an officer.

He entered the United States Military Academy in July 1882 and graduated 61st out of a class of 77 in July 1886.

== Military service ==
Following graduation from USMA, Johnson commissioned into the infantry and performed frontier duty with the 11th and 17th Infantry Regiments on the frontier in Arizona.

During the Spanish–American War, Johnson served as a first lieutenant with the 17th Infantry Regiment, which participated in the siege and surrender of Santiago, Cuba. He was later awarded the Silver Star for his gallantry in action on July 1, 1898. Johnson subsequently served in the Philippine–American War.

From 1901 to 1907, Johnson held a variety of posts commanding small units within the US and abroad. From November 1903 to February 1906, he commanded a company of the 13th Infantry Regiment in California and the Philippines. From August 1907 to October 1909, Johnson attended the Army Service Schools, graduating from the School of the Line in 1908, and then the Army War College, graduating in 1909.

Following that, Johnson was promoted to major on December 1, 1909, and assigned a battalion of the 19th Infantry Regiment in the Philippines. Following his service in the Philippines, he instructed and inspected the Minnesota Militia until September 2, 1913, when he was transferred to Texas where he commanded a battalion of the 22nd Infantry Regiment until December 1914. Johnson was moved from Texas to Minnesota, where he was promoted to lieutenant colonel in May 1916, and back, where he served as acting commander of the 3rd Texas Infantry Regiment at Galveston in May 1917.

Promoted to colonel on May 15, 1917, Johnson commanded the 36th Infantry Regiment at Fort Snelling, Minnesota from June to July 1917.

== World War I ==
In November 1917, Johnson was sent to Paris as part of the American Expeditionary Forces. He took command of an intermediate section of the Service of Supply. On April 12, 1918, he was promoted to brigadier general. During his command, he received the Army Distinguished Service Medal and the Legion of Honour for efficiently utilizing female labor in Nevers, France. The citation for his Army DSM reads:

The President of the United States of America, authorized by Act of Congress, July 9, 1918, takes pleasure in presenting the Army Distinguished Service Medal to Brigadier General Arthur Johnson, United States Army, for exceptionally meritorious and distinguished services to the Government of the United States, in a duty of great responsibility during World War I. In Command of the Intermediate Section, Services of Supply, General Johnson had the responsibility of forwarding to the front great quantities of supplies and thousands of replacements for the combatant units, in which important duty he displayed untiring zeal and exceptional executive ability.

== Postwar and retirement ==
Johnson was reverted to the rank of colonel on March 15, 1920. He commanded the 41st Infantry Regiment at Camp Meade, Maryland from November 1920 to August 1921. Johnson retired on July 9, 1925, having reached the mandatory retirement age of 64. An act of Congress restored his wartime rank of brigadier general in June 1930.

Following his retirement, he lived with his family in Wilmette, Illinois, where he died on February 3, 1946, at the age of 84. He was interred at Arlington National Cemetery four days later.
