= Malvern Hill Barnum =

American army officer

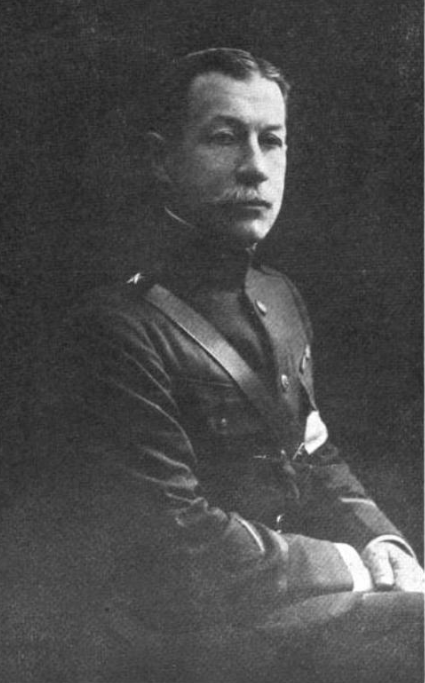
- Born: September 3, 1863; Syracuse, New York, U.S.
- Died: February 18, 1942 (aged 78); Brookline, Massachusetts, U.S.
- Relatives: BG Henry A. Barnum (father)
- Military career
- Allegiance: United States
- Branch: United States Army
- Service years: 1886–1927
- Rank: Major General
- Service number: 0-161
- Conflicts: Spanish–American War; World War I

Malvern Hill Barnum (September 3, 1863 – February 18, 1942) was an American army officer, Brigadier general, and Major general active during World War I.

== Early life ==
Barnum was born in Syracuse, New York. He was named after the Battle of Malvern Hill, where his father Henry A. Barnum had been gravely wounded the previous year. In 1886, he graduated number forty-two of seventy-seven from the United States Military Academy.

== Career ==
After graduating, Barnum was commissioned in the Third Cavalry. In 1893, he became a distinguished graduate of the Infantry and Cavalry School and was on duty at Rock Island Arsenal from 1893 to 1894.

In the Santiago campaign, he was adjutant of the Tenth Cavalry and was wounded on July 2, 1898, at San Juan Hill.

From 1899 to 1902, Barnum was assistant quartermaster at the United States Military Academy. For four years, he was aide to General J. Weston in the Philippines, and from 1910 to 1911 he was adjutant of the Eighth Cavalry. In 1915, Barnum graduated from Army War College and was on General Staff duty until 1917.

On October 31, 1917, he was made a brigadier general of the National Army and took command of the 183rd Infantry Brigade, 92nd Division. From December 1918 to July 1919, he was the chief of the American section of the Inter-Allied Armistice Commission. From 1920 to 1923, Barnum commanded the Disciplinary Barracks at Fort Leavenworth, Kansas. On February 9, 1923, he became a brigadier general and was given command of the 18th Infantry Brigade. Barnum became a major general on June 12, 1927, and retired the following September.

Barnum was commander of the Massachusetts Commander of the Loyal Legion and later served as national commander-in-chief of the organization from 1940 to 1941.

== Awards ==
Barnum was awarded the Distinguished Service Medal and the Purple Heart from the United States, commander of the Legion of Honor from France, commander of the Order of the Bath from Britain, commander of the Order of Leopold and Croix de Guerre from Belgium, and the Order of Saints Maurice and Lazarus from Italy. He also received the Spanish Campaign Medal, the Philippine Campaign Medal and the Victory Medal.

== Death and legacy ==
Malvern Hill Barnum died in Brookline, Massachusetts at the age of seventy-eight on February 18, 1942. He was interred at the West Point Cemetery on February 21, 1942.

== Bibliography ==
- "Commander-in-Chief Major General Malvern Hill Barnum". MOLLUS—Commander-in-Chief Major General Malvern Hill Barnum. Military Order of the Loyal Legion of the United States, n.d. Web. August 12, 2016.
- Davis, Henry Blaine Jr. Generals in Khaki. Raleigh, NC: Pentland Press, 1998. ISBN 1571970886 OCLC 231779136
- Marquis Who's Who, Inc. Who Was Who in American History, the Military. Chicago: Marquis Who's Who, 1975. ISBN 0837932017 OCLC 657162692
- Pershing, John J., and John T. Greenwood. 2013. My life before the World War: 1860-1917; a memoir. Lexington, Kentucky: Univ. Press of Kentucky. ISBN 9780813141978 OCLC 859376304
