= Walter Augustus Bethel =

United States Army officer (1866–1954)

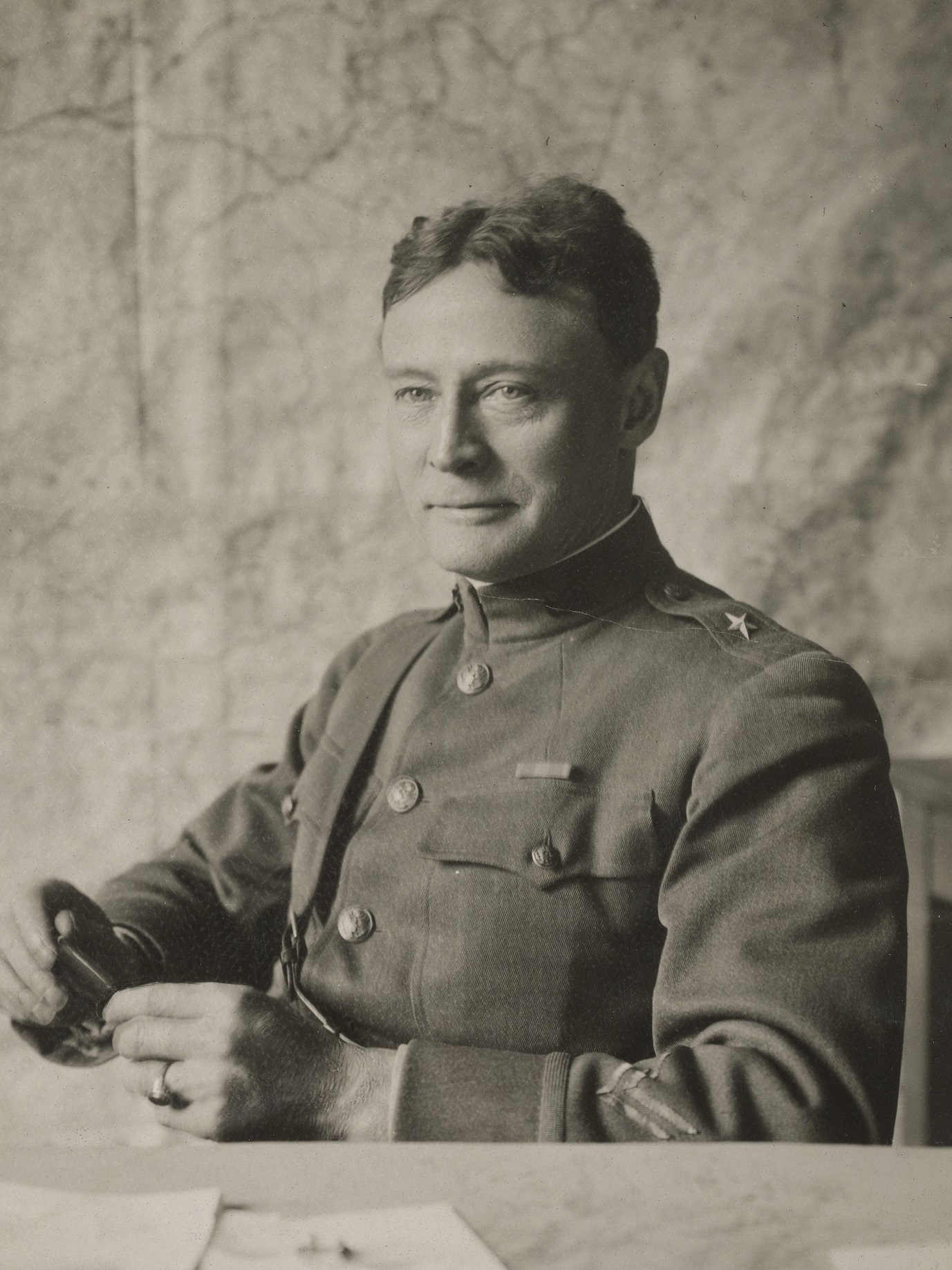
- Bethel at AEF headquarters in Chaumont, September 1918
- Born: November 25, 1866; Freeport, Ohio, US
- Died: January 11, 1954 (aged 87); Washington, D.C., US
- Burial place: West Point Cemetery, West Point, New York
- Education: Atlanta Law School (B.L.); Columbian Law School (LL.M.)
- Spouse: Elizabeth Strong Bethel (m. 1904-1954, his death)
- Children: 3
- Military career
- Allegiance: United States
- Branch: United States Army
- Service years: 1889–1924
- Rank: Major General
- Service number: 0-316
- Unit: United States Army Judge Advocate General's Corps
- Commands: Judge Advocate General of the United States Army
- Conflicts: Spanish–American War; World War I
- Awards: Army Distinguished Service Medal
- Other work: Attorney

Walter Augustus Bethel (November 25, 1866 – January 11, 1954) was a career officer in the United States Army. A veteran of the Spanish–American War and World War I, he attained the rank of major general and was most notable for his service as Judge Advocate General of the United States Army from 1923 to 1924.

== Early life ==
Bethel was born in Freeport, Ohio, the son of David Ridgley Bethel and Rebecca Jane (Brown) Bethel. He entered the United States Military Academy and graduated number fourteen of 49 in the class of 1889. Among his fellow graduates included several men who would become general officers, such as Charles Dudley Rhodes, Clement Flagler, Eben Eveleth Winslow, Frank Daniel Webster, William G. Haan, Winthrop S. Wood, Chester Harding, William L. Kenly, Joseph D. Leitch, William S. Graves, George LeRoy Irwin, William Wright Harts, Edward McGlachlin Jr., Charles Crawford and William Lassiter. Charles Young was another distinguished graduate, becoming the first African American to attain the rank of colonel.

== Career ==
Bethel was commissioned in the artillery. He received his B.L. degree from Atlanta Law School in 1892 and switched to the Judge Advocate General's Department. In 1894, he received his LL.M. degree from Columbian Law School (now George Washington University Law School) in Washington, D.C. During 1894 and 1895, he was an instructor of chemistry at the United States Military Academy. From 1895 to 1899 he instructed law at West Point. He served on the Puerto Rican Expedition from January to November 1898.

On August 5, 1917, he was promoted to brigadier general and was the Judge Advocate General from 1917 to 1920. After the war, he served in the JAG headquarters in Washington. In 1923, Bethel became the Judge Advocate General of the army, with the rank of major general. In 1924, he retired due to poor eyesight, and from 1926 to 1947 he engaged in the practice of international law. In 1940, Atlanta Law School awarded Bethel the honorary degree of LL.D.

== Awards ==
He received the Army Distinguished Service Medal for his actions during World War I, the citation for which reads:

The President of the United States of America, authorized by Act of Congress, July 9, 1918, takes pleasure in presenting the Army Distinguished Service Medal to Brigadier General Walter Augustus Bethel, United States Army, for exceptionally meritorious and distinguished services to the Government of the United States, in a duty of great responsibility during World War I. As Judge Advocate of the American Expeditionary Forces, General Bethel organized this important department and administered its affairs with conspicuous efficiency from the date of the arrival in France of the first American combat troops. His marked legal ability and sound judgment were important factors in the splendid work of his department, and he at all times handled with success the various military and international problems that arose as a result of the operation of our armies.

== Death and legacy ==
Walter Augustus Bethel died at the age of eighty-seven on January 11, 1954.

== Bibliography ==
- Davis, Henry Blaine Jr. (1998). Generals in Khaki. Raleigh, North Carolina: Pentland Press. ISBN 1571970886. OCLC 40298151.
