= Joseph D. Leitch =

U.S. Army major general

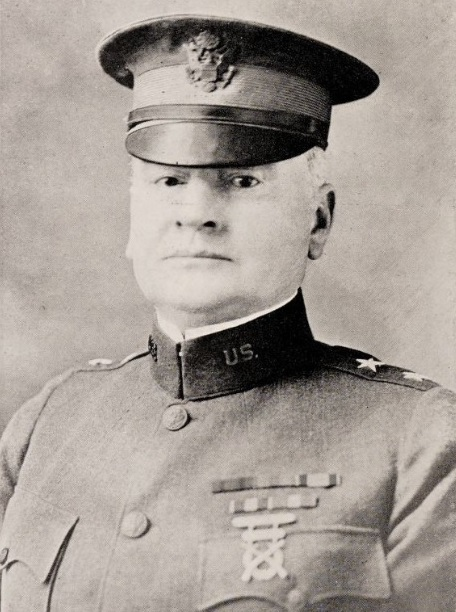
- From 1919's Illustrated Historical Souvenir of 13th Field Artillery Brigade, Camp Lewis, Wash.
- Born: March 8, 1864; Montague, Michigan
- Died: October 26, 1938 (aged 74); San Francisco, California
- Burial place: San Francisco National Cemetery
- Alma mater: Doane College (attended)
- Spouse: Margaret Crandal (m. 1891-1938, his death)
- Children: 2
- Relatives: Robert A. McClure (son-in-law)
- Military career
- Allegiance: United States
- Branch: United States Army
- Service years: 1889–1928
- Rank: Major General
- Service number: 0-281
- Unit: U.S. Army Infantry Branch
- Commands: Company B, 24th Infantry Regiment; Company G, 25th Infantry Regiment; 1st Battalion, 25th Infantry Regiment; Company C, 25th Infantry Regiment; Company L, 25th Infantry Regiment; Camp Vickers, Philippines; 1st Battalion, 28th Infantry Regiment; 3rd Battalion, 27th Infantry Regiment; 40th Infantry Regiment; Officers' Training Camp, Fort Snelling; 15th Brigade, 8th Division; 8th Division; 13th Division; 27th Infantry Regiment; 8th Brigade, 4th Infantry Division; Fort McPherson, Georgia; 5th Brigade, 3rd Infantry Division; Vancouver Barracks, Washington; 3rd Infantry Division; Fort Lewis, Washington
- Conflicts: American Indian Wars; Spanish–American War; Philippine–American War; United States occupation of Veracruz; World War I North Russia intervention
- Awards: Army Distinguished Service Medal; Silver Star

Joseph D. Leitch (March 8, 1864 – October 26, 1938) was a career officer in the United States Army.

A veteran of the American Indian Wars, Spanish–American War, Philippine–American War, United States occupation of Veracruz, World War I, and North Russia intervention, he attained the rank of major general and was a recipient of the Army Distinguished Service Medal, Silver Star Italian Order of Saints Maurice and Lazarus and Czechoslovak Cross of War. Leitch was most notable for his service as commander of the 13th Division and 3rd Division, as well as inspector general and chief of staff for American Expeditionary Force, Siberia.

== Early life ==
Joseph Dugald Leitch was born in Montague, Michigan on March 8, 1864, the son of Dugald Leitch and Sarah (Ferguson) Leitch. His family moved to Nebraska when Leitch was six years old, and he was raised and educated in Montague and in Clay Center, Nebraska. He attended Doane College in 1882 and 1883. While at Doane, Leitch took part in the school's military program, the Doane College Light Guards, and advanced through the ranks to become the unit's first lieutenant.

In early 1883, Leitch was an unsuccessful applicant to the United States Military Academy. He applied successfully in late 1883 and began attendance at West Point in 1884. He graduated in 1889 ranked 44th of 49 and in June 1889 he received his commission as a second lieutenant of Infantry. Among his fellow graduates included several men who would become general officers, such as Charles Dudley Rhodes, Clement Flagler, Eben Eveleth Winslow, Frank Daniel Webster, Walter Augustus Bethel, Winthrop S. Wood, Chester Harding, William L. Kenly, William Lassiter, Edward McGlachlin Jr., George LeRoy Irwin, William Wright Harts, William G. Haan, Charles Crawford and William S. Graves. Charles Young was another distinguished graduate, becoming the first African American to attain the rank of colonel.

== Early career ==
Leitch was assigned to the 24th Infantry Regiment and posted to Fort Bayard, New Mexico, where he served from October 1889 to December 1891. From December 1891 to May 1892, he was the post adjutant at Camp San Carlos, Arizona. He served with Company A, 24th Infantry and as post adjutant, post exchange officer, and post signal officer at Fort Huachuca, Arizona from May 1892 to October 1896. During his years in New Mexico and Arizona, Leitch participated in several campaigns against the Apache Indians. Leitch served at Fort Douglas, Utah, from October 1896 to April 1898. He was promoted to first lieutenant in the 7th Infantry in December 1896 and transferred back to the 24th Infantry in March 1897.

== Spanish–American War ==
The 24th Infantry was mobilized for the Spanish–American War in April 1898, and Leitch was with the regiment during organization and training at Chickamauga Park, Georgia and in Tampa, Florida. As commander of Company B, and later as acting regimental adjutant, Leitch served in Cuba during the summer of 1898, including the Battle of San Juan Hill and Siege of Santiago. Leitch contracted yellow fever in late July 1898, and remained at a convalescent camp in Siboney, Cuba until September 1898. He was demobilized at Camp Wikoff, New York at the end of September and returned to duty at Fort Douglas in October.

== Philippine–American War ==
Leitch served as adjutant of the 24th Infantry from Oct 1898 to October 1899 and was promoted to captain in the 25th Infantry on September 8, 1899. He served with the 25th Infantry at the Presidio of San Francisco from March to October 1899. He served briefly as aide-de-camp for William Rufus Shafter, commander of the Department of California, then was reassigned to Fort Sam Houston, Texas as commander of Company G, 25th Infantry, which he led from November 1899 to July 1900. He continued in command of Company G at Fort Logan, Colorado from July to September 1900. Leitch took command of 1st Battalion, 25th Infantry at the Presidio of San Francisco in September 1900, and traveled to the Philippines with his unit to take part in the Philippine–American War. After arrival in Bolinao, in November, Leitch resumed command of Company G, and he remained in this post until August 1901.

In September 1901, Leitch was assigned as adjutant of the 25th Infantry. He served at Iba, Zambales, Malabon, and Manila and remained in the Philippines until July 1902. In August 1902, the 25th Infantry returned to the United States. Leitch served briefly at the Presidio of San Francisco before the regiment moved to its new post in Nebraska.

== Continued career ==
Leitch served with the 25th Infantry at Fort Niobrara, Nebraska from August 1902 to October 1903. From October 1903 to May 1904 he commanded the regiment's Companies C and L at Fort Des Moines, Iowa. From May 1904 to July 1906, Leitch served again at Fort Niobrara, and he was the 25th Infantry's regimental commissary officer from August 1904 to June 1906.

From November 1906 to June 1907, Leitch was posted to Fort Bliss, Texas as commander of Company G, 25th Infantry. He remained in command at the Presidio of San Francisco from June to August 1907, then traveled again to the Philippines, where he led Company G from August 1907 to October 1909. During this tour of duty in the Philippines, Leitch commanded Company G in Malabang from September 1907 to December 1908. From January to March 1909, he commanded his company, the post at Camp Vickers on the southern shores of Lake Lanao, and a company of Filipino Scouts. He continued in command of Company G at Parang from March to 1909. He was on leave from July to September, 1909, then returned to the United States.

Leitch with his regiment at Fort Lawton, Washington from October 1909 to January 1910. From January 1910 to August 1913, he served as secretary of the Army General Staff and Army War College. He was promoted to major in the 28th Infantry on March 11, 1911. From September 1913 to April 1914, Leitch was a student at the Army War College. In May 1914, he was assigned as adjutant of the 5th Infantry Brigade during the United States occupation of Veracruz, and he was subsequently assigned as chief of staff of the American Expeditionary Force in Veracruz. After a leave of absence, Leitch commanded 1st Battalion, 28th Infantry in Galveston, Texas from February to August 1915, and 3rd Battalion, 27th Infantry in Texas City, Texas from August to September 1915.

From October 1915 to January 1916, Leitch commanded 3rd Battalion, 27th Infantry at Camp Grant, Balboa, Panama Canal Zone while awaiting travel to the Philippines. He commanded the battalion at Fort William McKinley, Philippines from March to October 1916, and he was promoted to lieutenant colonel in the 8th Infantry on July 1, 1916. Leitch served in the Philippines with the 8th Infantry from October 1916 to May 1917.

== World War I ==
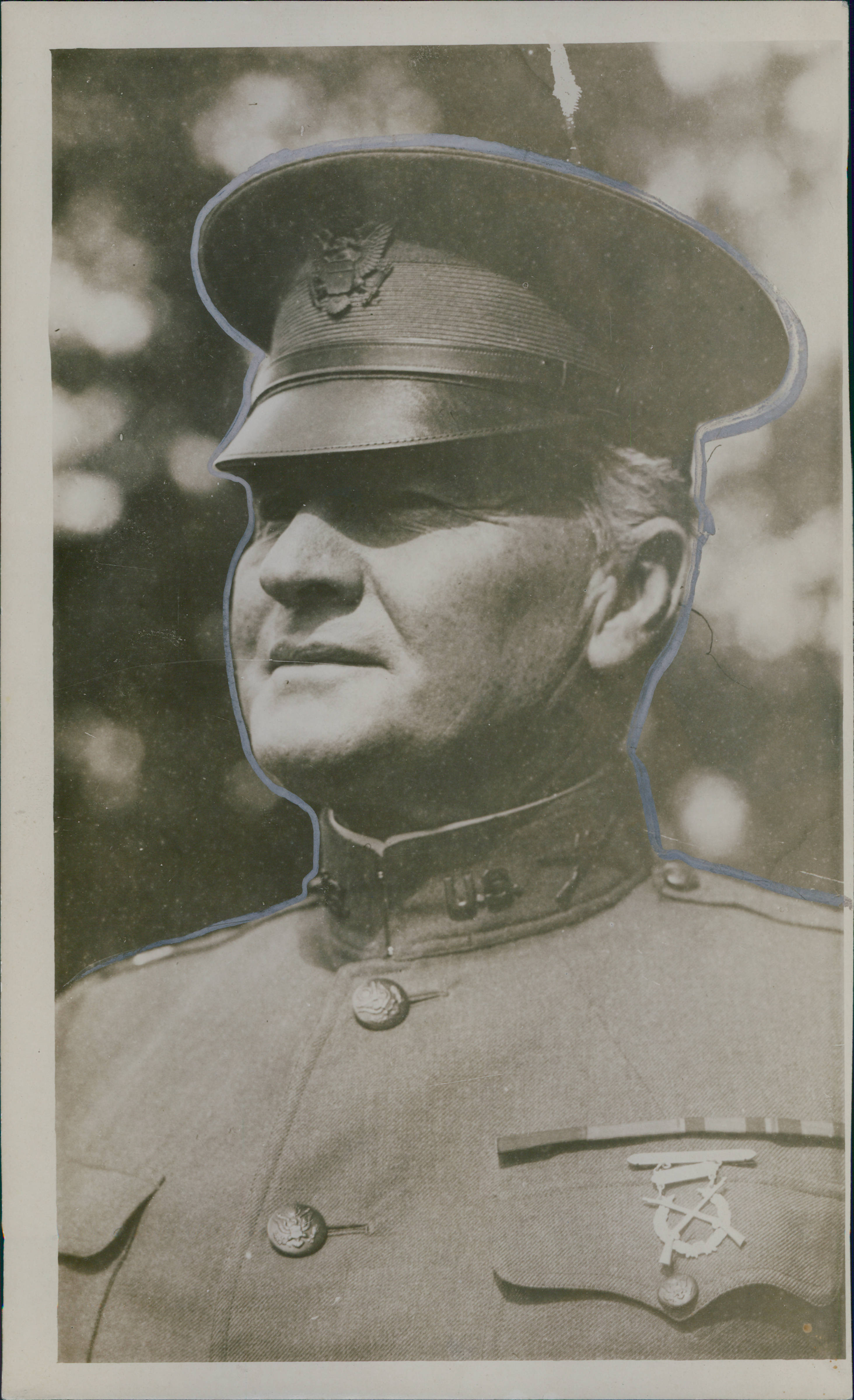
Leitch as a colonel at Fort Snelling

The United States entered World War I in April 1917. After returning to the United States, Leitch was assigned to command the 40th Infantry Regiment at Fort Snelling, Minnesota, and he served from June to August 1917. He was promoted to colonel on July 18, 1917. From August to September 1917, he commanded the Officers' Training Camp at Fort Snelling. From October 1917 to February 1918, Leitch served on the Army General Staff in Washington, D.C. he was promoted to temporary brigadier general on December 17, 1917.

From February to October 1918, Leitch commanded 15th Brigade, 8th Division at Camp Fremont, California, and he served as acting division commander on several occasions. He was promoted to temporary major general on October 1, 1918. From October 1918 to April 1919, he commanded the 13th Division at Fort Lewis, Washington. In April 1919, Leitch returned to his permanent rank of colonel.

== Later career ==
Leitch served in Russia from May 1919 to March 1920, first as inspector general, and later as chief of staff of American Expeditionary Force, Siberia. He commanded the 27th Infantry in Manila, Philippines from March to August 1920. From August 1920 to February 1921, he was chief of staff of the Philippine Department. He served as chief of staff for the 3rd Division at Fort Lewis, Washington from March 1921 to September 1924. From October 1924 to June 1925, Leitch was based in Los Angeles as liaison officer to units of the Organized Reserve Corps based in southern California. From June 1925 to March 1926, Leitch was stationed at the Presidio of San Francisco as liaison to ORC units based in northern California. In January 1916, he was promoted to permanent brigadier general.

From April 1926 to January 1927, Leitch commanded 8th Brigade, 4th Infantry Division and the post of Fort McPherson, Georgia. From February to October 1927, Leitch commanded 5th Brigade, 3rd Infantry Division and the post of Vancouver Barracks, Washington. From October 1927 to March 1928, Leitch commanded the 3rd Infantry Division and the post of Fort Lewis, Washington. He left the military in March 1928 after reaching the mandatory retirement age of 64.

== Awards ==
Leitch's service in Russia was recognized with award of the Army Distinguished Service Medal. The citation for the medal reads:

The President of the United States of America, authorized by Act of Congress, July 9, 1918, takes pleasure in presenting the Army Distinguished Service Medal to Colonel (Infantry) Joseph Dugald Leitch, United States Army, for exceptionally meritorious and distinguished services to the Government of the United States, in a duty of great responsibility during World War I. As Chief of Staff of the American Expeditionary Forces in Siberia, Colonel Leitch gave proof of his great breadth of vision, keen foresight, sound judgment, and tact. By his brilliant professional attainments, coupled with great diplomacy, he handled most ably the many delicate situations with which he was confronted. His fine soldierly qualities were at all times outstanding, and by his masterful grasp of the situation he was able to meet successfully each new and difficult problem with which he was faced. He rendered most conspicuous services of inestimable value to the Government in a place of great responsibility and at a time of gravest importance.

In addition, his Russian service resulted in award of the Order of Saints Maurice and Lazarus (Officer) from Italy and the Cross of War from Czechoslovakia. Leitch's heroism in the Philippines was recognized with the silver Citation Star. When the Silver Star medal was created, Leitch's award was converted to the new decoration.

In addition to Leitch's awards for service in Russia and heroism the Philippines, he was a recipient of the Indian Campaign Medal, Spanish Campaign Medal, Army of Cuban Occupation Medal, Philippine Campaign Medal, and Mexican Service Medal.

== Retirement and death ==
In retirement, Leitch was a resident of San Francisco. He died at Letterman General Hospital on October 26, 1938. He was buried at San Francisco National Cemetery.

== Family ==
In October 1891, Leitch married Margaret Crandal, the daughter of Frederick Mortimer Crandal, a career Army officer who attained the rank of brevet brigadier general in the Union Army during the American Civil War. They were the parents of two daughters, Marjory and Dorothy.

Marjory Leitch was the wife of Major General Robert A. McClure. Dorothy Leitch was married to Marquis "Mark" D. Jones.
