= William G. Haan =

United States Army general

William George Haan
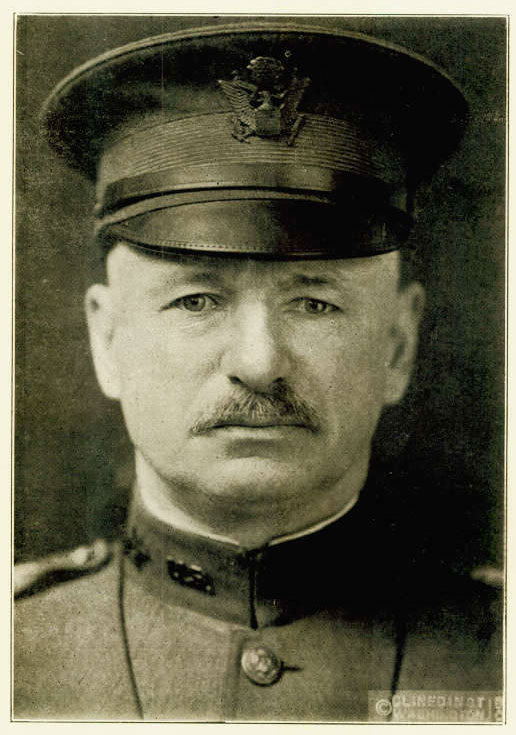
- Born: October 4, 1863; Crown Point, Indiana, United States
- Died: October 26, 1924 (aged 61); Washington, D.C., United States
- Military career
- Allegiance: United States
- Branch: United States Army
- Service years: 1889–1922
- Rank: Major General
- Nickname: "Bunker" (Note: "His rather bulky body and his deliberate heavy movements made him appear plodding and stolid, and his friends gave him the nickname "Bunker." To them it seemed somehow to describe both his lumbering person, and his good-natured, reliable disposition. The name must have fitted him; it was applied to him by all the comrades of a lifetime.")
- Service number: 0-35
- Unit: Field Artillery Branch
- Commands: 57th Field Artillery Brigade; 32nd Division; VII Corps
- Conflicts: Spanish–American War; Philippine–American War; World War I
- Awards: Army Distinguished Service Medal; Croix de Guerre (France)

Major General William George Haan (October 4, 1863 – October 26, 1924) was a senior United States Army officer. He commanded the 32nd Division during the final year of World War I, and served in numerous other conflicts during his career.

== Early life and education ==
William George Haan was born on October 4, 1863, near Crown Point, Indiana, the son of German immigrants Nicholas Haan and Anna M. Haan.

== Early military career ==
He attended the United States Military Academy (USMA) at West Point, New York, from where he graduated twelfth in a class of forty-nine in June 1889, becoming a second lieutenant in the Field Artillery Branch of the United States Army. Among his fellow graduates included several men who would, like Haan himself, rise to the rank of brigadier general or higher in their later military careers. They included Charles Dudley Rhodes, Clement Flagler, Eben Eveleth Winslow, Frank Daniel Webster, Walter Augustus Bethel, Winthrop S. Wood, Chester Harding, William L. Kenly, Joseph D. Leitch, William S. Graves, George LeRoy Irwin, William Wright Harts, Edward McGlachlin Jr., Charles Crawford and William Lassiter. Charles Young was another distinguished graduate, becoming the first African American to attain the rank of colonel.

Haan was promoted to first lieutenant in August 1896. He was then made a professor of military science and tactics at Illinois Normal School (now Illinois State University). In 1898–1901 he served as captain of Volunteers, in both Cuba and the Philippines. He was made a captain of the Regular Army in February 1901, and was mustered out of the Volunteer service the next month. In 1905 he graduated from the United States Army War College, the same year he married, on August 16, to a woman named Margaret.

From 1903 to 1906 he served as a member of the General Staff and went to Panama for Theodore Roosevelt. As Acting Chief of Staff of the Pacific Division, he assisted with relief work after the 1906 San Francisco earthquake. For the next several years, he was responsible for several coastal defense positions. In April 1907 he became a Major and in December 1911 he was promoted to lieutenant colonel. He again served on the General Staff from 1912 to 1914, and in July 1916 was promoted to a colonel in the Coast Artillery.

== World War I ==
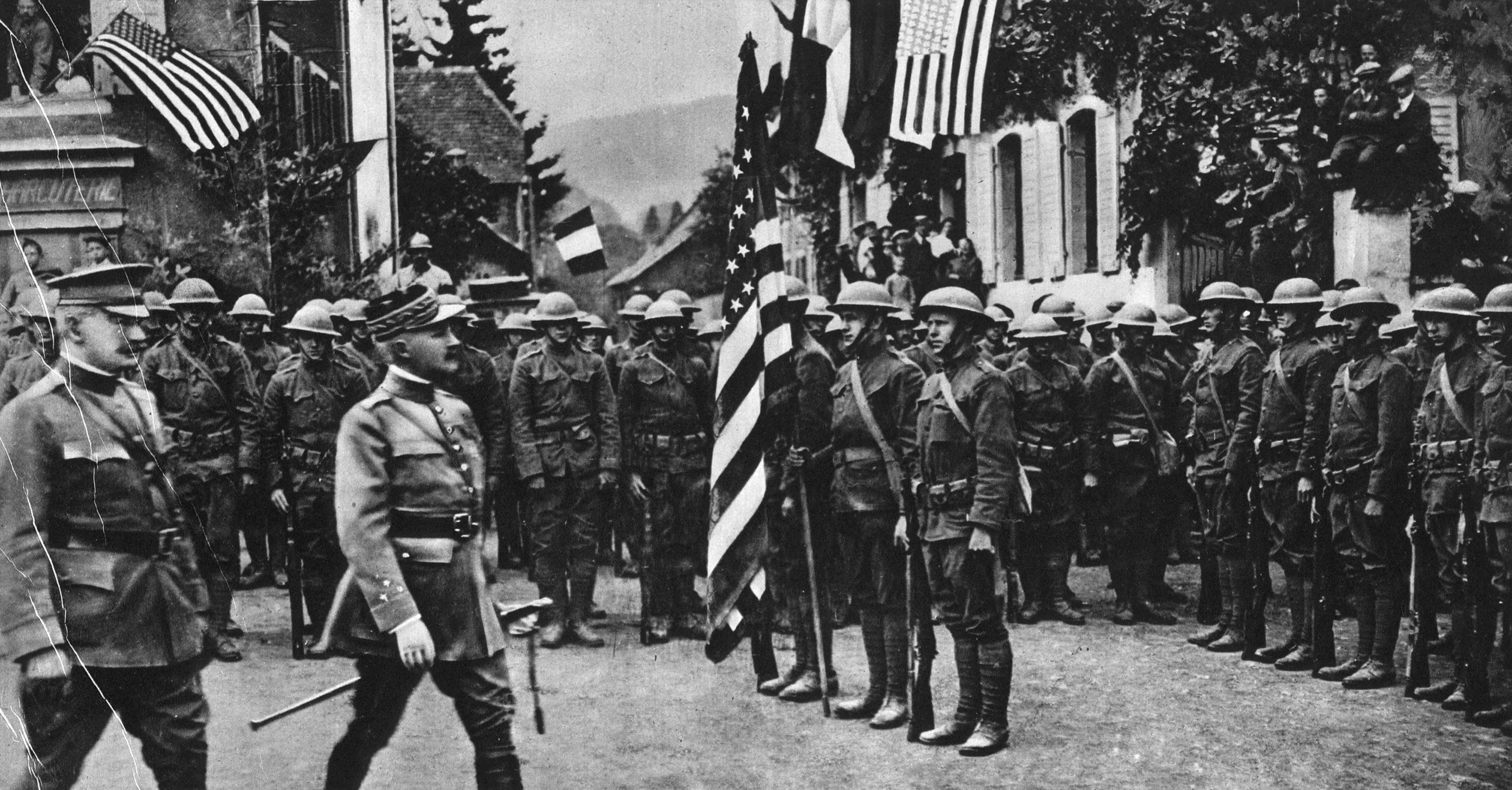
William G. Haan, 1918.

In April 1917, the same month of the American entry into World War I, he was given the temporary rank of brigadier general and assigned to command the 57th Field Artillery Brigade of the 32nd Division at Camp MacArthur, Texas. Troop E commanded by Captain John S. Coney was formed in Kenosha on May 10, 1917, and the division was officially formed on May 29, 1917. On August 26, 1917, Major General James Parker assumed command. Parker had previously been awarded the Medal of Honor during the Philippine–American War. Only two months later, the 32nd Division was activated in July 1917 at Camp MacArthur, Waco, Texas of National Guard units from Wisconsin and Michigan. In December 1917, Haan was promoted again to the temporary rank of major general and was commander of the division.

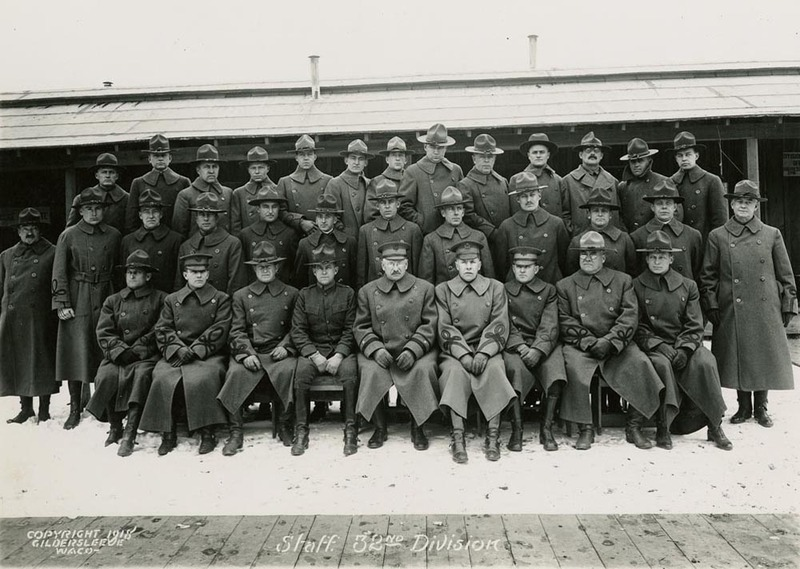
Major General William G. Haan, commanding the 32nd Division, along with members of his divisional staff at Camp MacArthur, January 1918.

Division leadership was switched several times between Parker and Haan before the unit arrived in France in February 1918 under Haan's leadership, becoming the sixth U.S. division to join the American Expeditionary Forces (AEF). In July, it entered the line with the French 6th Army.

=== 32nd Division combat in France and Germany ===
The division's men were the first American soldiers to enter cross the German border, piercing the famed and until this time invincible German Hindenburg Line of defense. Major General James Parker reassumed command on December 7, 1917, leading the unit into Alsace in May 1918, attacking 19 kilometres (12 mi) in seven days.

=== Origin of the 32nd Division nickname ===
During the Second Battle of the Marne, the 32nd Division captured Fismes, and during August their successful capture of Juvigny earned it the nickname "Le Terribles". A French general, impressed by their accomplishment, commented that they ""shot through every line the Germans put before it." The division was nicknamed Les Terribles, honoring them for their unrelenting and successful attacks against the Germans. The division's shoulder patch, a line shot through with a red arrow, signifies its tenacity during World War I. It was the only American unit in General Charles Mangins famous 10th French Army, it fought in the Oise-Aisne offensive.

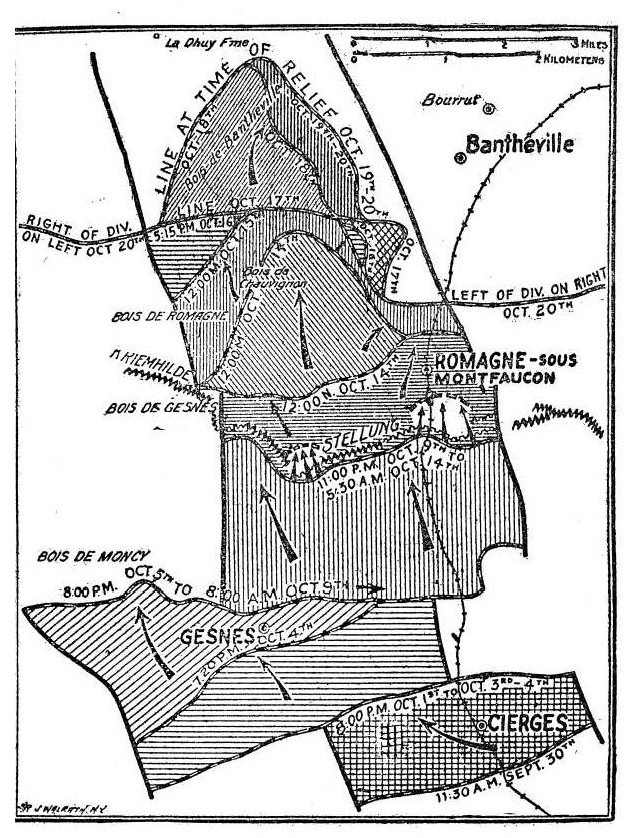
Operations of the 32nd Division in World War I in crossing the Hindenburg Line.

The division fought continuously for 20 days during the Meuse–Argonne offensive and penetrated the last German defensive stronghold, the Kriemhilde Stellung, crossing the Meuse River. Up to this point much of the war had been a stalemate, fought from static trench lines over the same few kilometers of terrain. It was for the fighting in the Meuse-Argonne that Haan would later be awarded the Army Distinguished Service Medal, the citation for which reads:

The President of the United States of America, authorized by Act of Congress, July 9, 1918, takes pleasure in presenting the Army Distinguished Service Medal to Major General William George Haan, United States Army, for exceptionally meritorious and distinguished services to the Government of the United States, in a duty of great responsibility during World War I. General Haan, in Command of the 32d Division, took a prominent part in the Argonne-Meuse offensive and in the brilliant and successful attack against the Cote Dame Marie, covering several days, which deprived the enemy of the key point of the position. His clear conception of the tactical situations involved showed him to be a military leader of superior order.

Their next objective was to flank the Germans at Metz. The division was the front line element of the Third U.S. Army. Members of the division marched 300 kilometres (190 mi) to the Rhine River. They were the first Allied army unit to pierce the famed German Hindenburg Line of defense. There they occupied the center sector in the Colbenz bridgehead for four months, during which they held 400 square kilometers and 63 towns. From May through November 1918, they were given only 10 days of rest. The division fought in three major offensives, engaging and defeating 23 German divisions. They took 2,153 prisoners and gained 32 kilometres (20 mi), pushing back every German counterattack. Their success was remarkable.

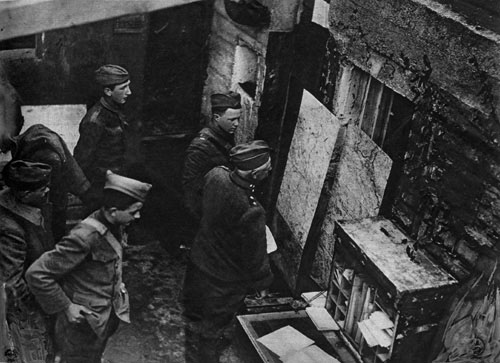
Major General Haan (center, with two stars on his shoulder) looking over a map in the 32nd Division's command post, located in a heavily reinforced concrete dugout, near Montfaucon, France, October 2, 1918.

In November, following the armistice, Haan became commander of VII Corps for occupation duty. A few days later he was promoted to permanent brigadier general. In April 1919 he returned to the US, again in commamd of the 32nd Division, and after its inactivation again, he served as head of the War Plans Division at the War Department in Washington, D.C. His permanent rank was advanced to major general in 1920, although he was forced to retire from the army in 1922, after over thirty years of continuous service.

=== Casualties and decorations ===
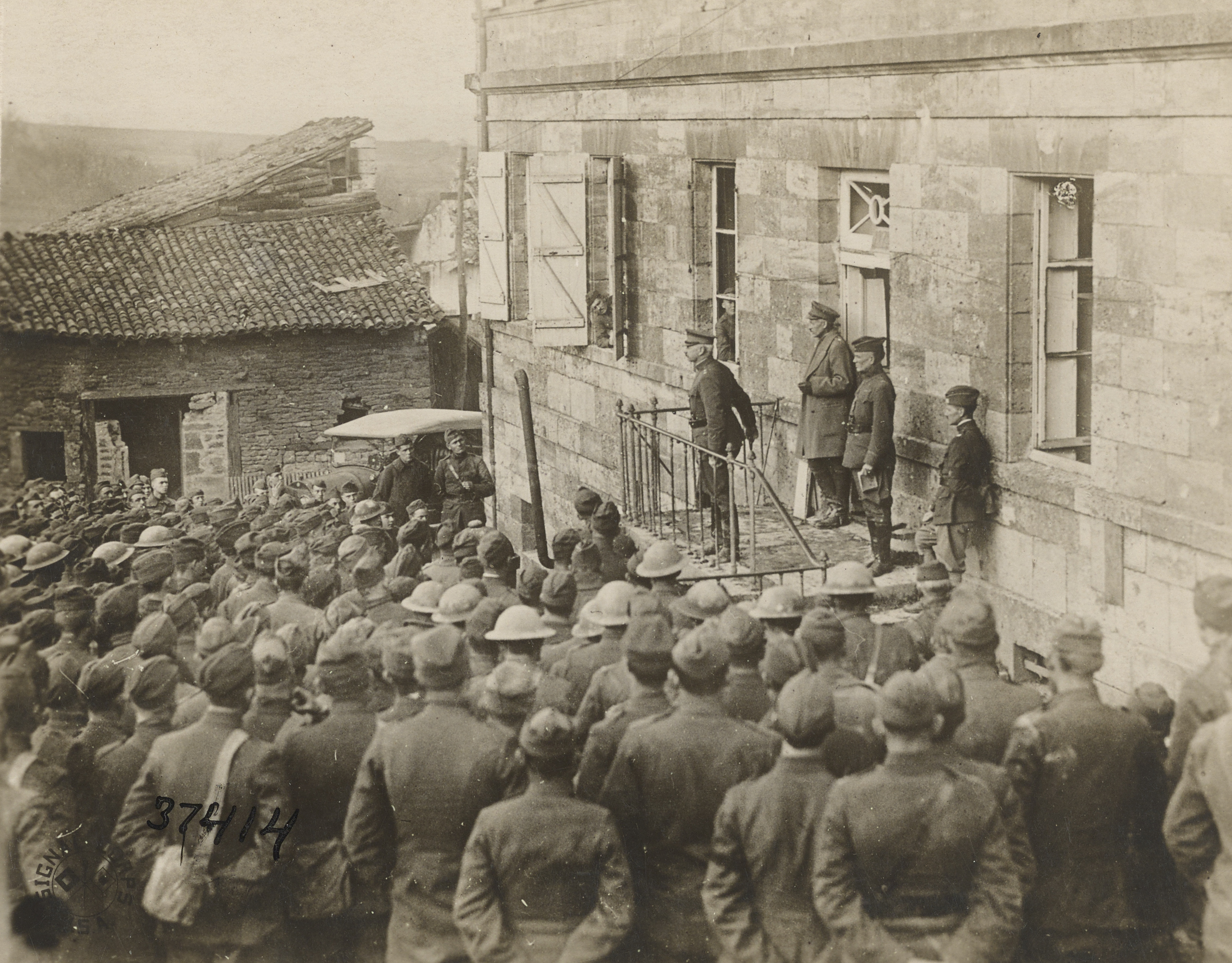
The commander of the 32nd Division, Major General William G. Haan, with Brigadier General Edwin B. Winans, congratulating doughboys of the 127th Regiment, 32nd Division on their good work and giving them instructions as to their future task of following up the Germans. Pictured here at Breheville, France, November 12, 1918.

The 32nd Division was still engaging German troops east of the Meuse River when the Armistice was finally signed. The division suffered a total of 13,261 casualties, including 2,250 men killed in action and 11,011 wounded, placing it third in the number of battle deaths among divisions of the AEF. The American, French, and Belgian governments decorated more than 800 officers and enlisted men for their gallantry in combat.

All four of the division's infantry regiments, the three artillery regiments, and the division's three machine gun battalions were awarded the Croix de Guerre by the Republic of France. The flag and standard of every unit in the division was authorized four American battle streamers.

Following the war's end, the division served in the Army of Occupation in Germany, commanded by Maj. Gen. William Lassiter. The division was inactivated on April 5, 1919. On July 24, 1924, the 32nd Division was reorganized again, composed of National Guard units from Wisconsin and Michigan. Its headquarters was home stationed at Lansing, Michigan.

== Final years and retirement ==
In July 1920, Haan was promoted to major general and named director of the War Plans Division. He retired in May 1922 and was for a time associated with the Milwaukee Journal. He died at Washington, D.C., on October 26, 1924. He was buried in Section 4 of Arlington National Cemetery.

The USS General W. G. Haan (AP-158), launched March 1945, was named in his honor.

Camp Haan, near Riverside California, was named for him. The camp was a World War II training base for coast artillery and anti-aircraft and later housed a prisoner-of-war camp.

== Bibliography ==
- Bullard, Robert Lee (2013). Fighting Generals: Illustrated Biographical Sketches of Seven Major Generals in World War I. Literary Licensing. ISBN 9781258861193.
- Cooke, James J. (1997). Pershing and his Generals: Command and Staff in the AEF. Praeger Publishers. ISBN 0-275-95363-7.
- Davis, Henry Blaine Jr. (1998). Generals in Khaki. Raleigh, North Carolina: Pentland Press. ISBN 1571970886. OCLC 40298151.
- Lengel, Edward G. (2008). To Conquer Hell: The Meuse-Argonne 1918. Henry Holt and Company, 2008. ISBN 978-0-8050-7931-9.
- Venzon, Anne Cipriano (2013). The United States in the First World War: an Encyclopedia. Hoboken, NJ: Taylor and Francis. ISBN 978-1-135-68453-2. OCLC 865332376.

Military offices
| Preceded by James Parker | Commanding General 32nd Division; 1917–1918 | Succeeded by William Lassiter |
| Preceded by Omar Bundy | Commanding General VII Corps; 1918–1919 | Succeeded by Charles Martin |
