= Charles Dudley Rhodes =

United States Marine Corps general (1865–1948)

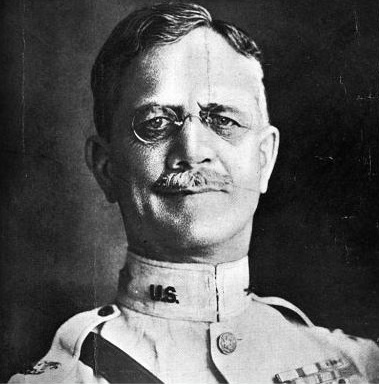
- Colonel Charles D. Rhodes, 1922
- Born: February 10, 1865; Delaware, Ohio, United States
- Died: January 24, 1948 (aged 82); Washington, D.C., United States
- Burial place: Arlington National Cemetery
- Military career
- Allegiance: United States
- Branch: United States Army
- Service years: 1889–1929
- Rank: Major general
- Nickname: "Teddy"
- Service number: 0-275
- Unit: Cavalry Branch
- Commands: Mounted Service School; 79th Field Artillery Regiment; 157th Artillery Brigade; 42nd Division; 34th Division
- Conflicts: Indian Wars; China Relief Expedition; Spanish–American War; World War I
- Awards: Distinguished Service Cross; Army Distinguished Service Medal; Silver Star; Order of the Bath; Legion of Honor
- Other work: Author, lecturer

Charles Dudley Rhodes (February 10, 1865 – January 24, 1948) was a United States Army major general. He was a prominent commander of cavalry units from the Indian Wars through World War I, and was a lecturer and author.

== Early life ==
The son of Major Dudley Woodbridge Rhodes and Marcia Parrish, Charles D. Rhodes was nicknamed "Teddy". He was born in Delaware, Ohio, on February 10, 1865, and graduated from Columbian University (now George Washington University) in 1885. In 1889 he graduated, 26th in a class of 49, from the United States Military Academy, receiving a commission as a second lieutenant of cavalry. Among his fellow graduates included several men who would become general officers, such as William S. Graves, Clement Flagler, Eben Eveleth Winslow, Frank Daniel Webster, Walter Augustus Bethel, Winthrop S. Wood, Chester Harding, William L. Kenly, Joseph D. Leitch, Edward McGlachlin Jr., George LeRoy Irwin, William Wright Harts, William G. Haan, Charles Crawford and William Lassiter. Charles Young was another distinguished graduate, becoming the first African American to attain the rank of colonel.

== Early military career ==
Rhodes served in the 6th Cavalry Regiment during the final US Army campaign against the Sioux.

Rhodes' post-Indian Wars assignments included professor of military science at Ohio Wesleyan University and commander of a cavalry troop during the China Relief Expedition.

== Spanish–American War ==
Rhodes served with the 6th Cavalry Regiment in the Philippines during the Spanish–American War. He received the Distinguished Service Cross for heroism at Cavite on the island of Luzon. The DSC citation reads:

The Distinguished Service Cross is presented to Charles D. Rhodes, Captain, U.S. Army, for extraordinary heroism in action near the barrio of San Nicolas, Pueblo of Bacoor, Cavite, Luzon, Philippine Islands, December 31, 1901. Captain Rhodes gallantly and fearlessly led an attack on a superior body of insurgents with two men of his troop, killing two of the enemy and wounding two, including their leader, and dispersing the remainder.

== Post Spanish–American War ==
Rhodes graduated from the United States Army Command and General Staff College in 1908.

In 1911, Rhodes was an umpire at the mounted exercise conducted by the Massachusetts Volunteer Militia.

Later in 1911, Rhodes and Paul Bernard Malone took part in a confidential mission, traveling to Mexico disguised as journalists to assess the likelihood that Francisco I. Madero could remain in power if he won the presidency in the 1912 election.

During the 1912 Connecticut Maneuvers, Rhodes served as assistant chief of staff for the Red Division.

In 1913 Rhodes was assigned as adjutant of the Cavalry Camp of Instruction at Fort Riley, Kansas, and from 1914 to 1917 Rhodes, promoted on July 1, 1916 to lieutenant colonel, served as commandant of Fort Riley's Mounted Service School.

== World War I ==
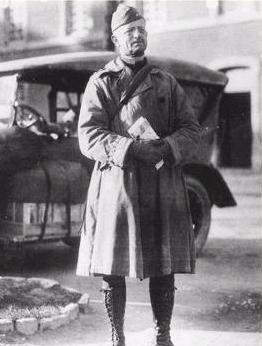
Rhodes as a major general during World War I

From June to December, after the American entry into World War I, Rhodes, who had been promoted to colonel on May 23, commanded the 21st Cavalry Regiment, which was reorganized as the 79th Field Artillery Regiment.

In December, after being promoted to brigadier general in the National Army, he commanded the 157th Field Artillery Brigade, part of the 82nd Division, from February to October 1918, leading the brigade overseas to the Western Front with the rest of the division in May.

Rhodes later assumed command of the 42nd "Rainbow" Infantry Division, receiving temporary promotion to major general on October 1, 1918. Within days of taking command of the division, however, in late 1918, Rhodes was injured in a plane crash, and turned the command over to Brigadier General Douglas MacArthur so he could recuperate.

For his services during the war, Rhodes was awarded the Army Distinguished Service Medal and the Silver Star. The citation for his Army DSM reads:

The President of the United States of America, authorized by Act of Congress, July 9, 1918, takes pleasure in presenting the Army Distinguished Service Medal to Major General Charles Dudley Rhodes, United States Army, for exceptionally meritorious and distinguished services to the Government of the United States, in a duty of great responsibility during World War I. As Commander of the Artillery Brigade in support of the 82d Division, during the offensive operations of the St. Mihiel salient and again in Command of an Artillery Brigade during the Meuse-Argonne offensive, by his marked ability shown in the conduct of his units General Rhodes contributed in a noted degree to the successes attained. Later he served with distinction as a member of the Inter-Allied Commission at Spa, rendering conspicuous services to the American Expeditionary Forces.

He also received the Order of the Bath from Great Britain and the Legion of Honor from France.

== Post World War I ==
Rhodes graduated from the Army War College in 1920.

His post-World War I assignments included commander of the 34th Infantry Division and Chief of Staff of US forces in the Philippines. He was promoted to permanent brigadier general in 1925, and major general in 1928.

== Career as an author ==
Rhodes was a writer and lecturer. He authored several books and magazine articles, as well as historical works on cavalry in the Civil War. His works include: History of the Cavalry of the Army of the Potomac (1900); The Vicksburg Campaign (1908); Letters of a West Point Cadet: An Epic in Blank Verse of the Class of 1889, United States Military Academy (1935); Chief Joseph and the Nez Perces Campaign of 1877 (1937); and Diary Notes of a Soldier (1940). Beginning in the 1890s, Rhodes also authored numerous articles and short stories which were published in magazines.

== Retirement and death ==
Rhodes retired from the Army in 1929 and resided in Washington, D.C. He died at Walter Reed Hospital on January 24, 1948, and was buried with his wife Mary Counselman (1867–1943) at Arlington National Cemetery.

== Bibliography ==
- Eickhoff, Mark (2015). A Most Human Chap: Major General Charles Dudley Rhodes and the Development of the American Way of War. Indiana University Press.
