= William Lassiter =

United States army general (1867–1959)

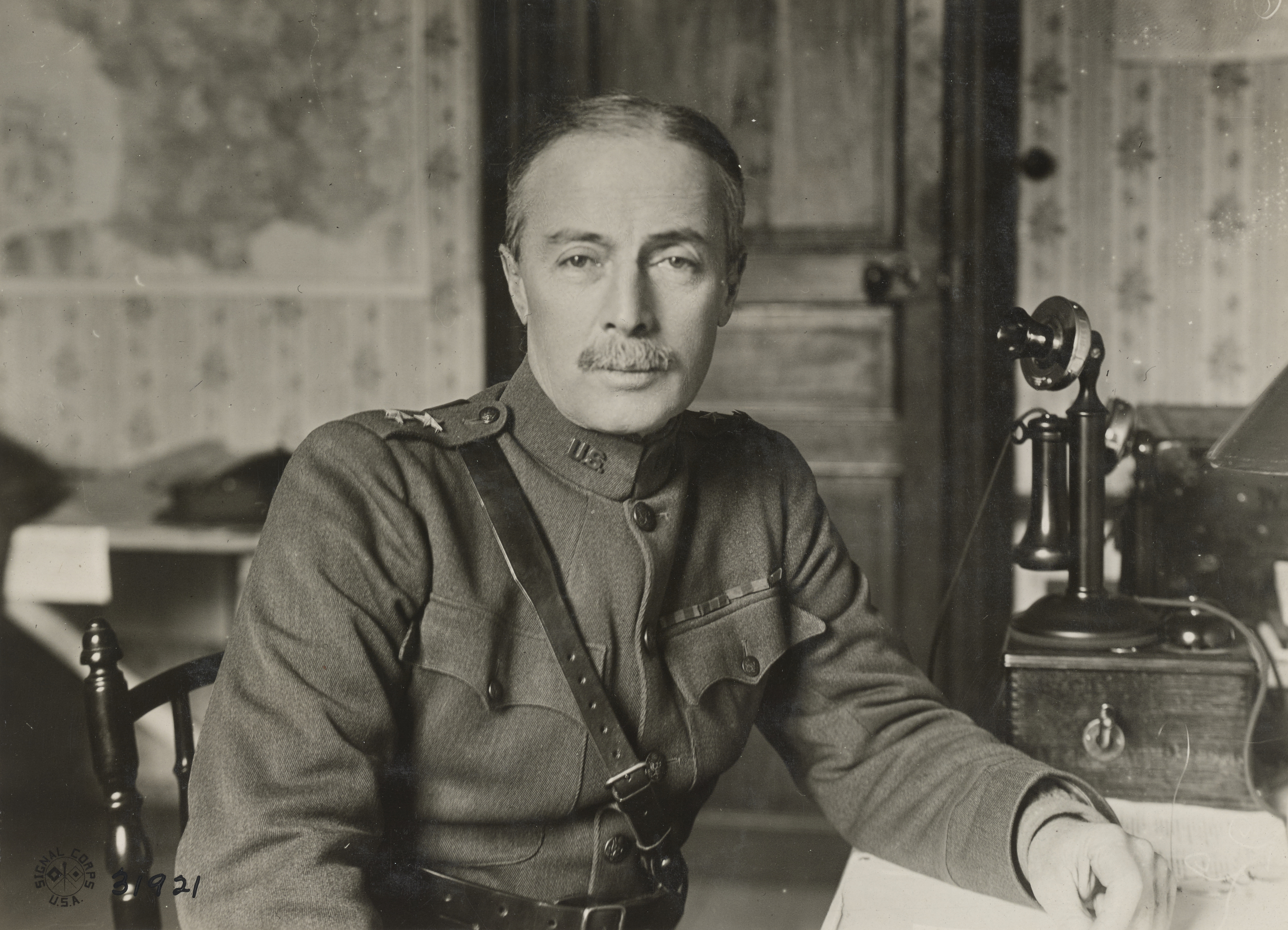
- William Lassiter, wearing the two stars of a major general, pictured here in October 1918 towards the end of World War I.
- Born: September 29, 1867; Petersburg, Virginia, U.S.
- Died: March 29, 1959 (aged 91); Santa Barbara, California, U.S.
- Burial place: Santa Barbara Cemetery
- Spouse: Jeannette Fallon Johnson (m. 1935)
- Relatives: Francis R. Lassiter (brother); Charles T. Lassiter (brother)
- Military career
- Allegiance: United States
- Service: United States Army
- Service years: 1889–1931
- Rank: Major General
- Service number: 0-70
- Unit: Field Artillery Branch
- Commands: 7th Field Artillery Battery; Base Section Number 3, England; U.S. Army Forces in England; 51st Field Artillery Brigade; I Corps Artillery; IV Corps Artillery; Second Army Artillery; 32nd Division; Third Army Artillery; Fort Knox; Panama Canal Division; Panama Canal Department; Sixth Corps Area; Philippine Department; Eighth Corps Area; Hawaiian Department
- Conflicts: Spanish–American War; Occupation of Veracruz; World War I Occupation of the Rhineland
- Awards: Distinguished Service Medal; Silver Star

William Lassiter (September 29, 1867 – March 29, 1959) was a career officer in the United States Army. He was a veteran of the Spanish–American War, occupation of Veracruz, World War I, and the occupation of the Rhineland and attained the rank of major general.

A native of Petersburg, Virginia, Lassiter graduated from the United States Military Academy in 1889 and began a career in the Army's Field Artillery Branch. His initial assignments included coastal forts in New York and California. During the Spanish–American War, he served in Cuba and took part in the Siege of Santiago, for which he was awarded the Silver Star. He subsequently served on the West Point faculty and carried out several years of temporary duty with the Inspector General, including postings to Cuba and the Philippines.

During World War I, Lassiter was promoted to brigadier general and major general, and served in several important command assignments. In the war's final days he was assigned to lead the 32nd Division, which he continued to lead during the post-war occupation of the Rhineland. For his wartime service, Lassiter received the Army Distinguished Service Medal and several foreign decorations. After the war, Lassiter received several high-profile command and staff assignments, including commander of the Panama Canal Division and Panama Canal Department, the Philippine Department and the Hawaiian Department.

Lassiter retired in 1931 as a permanent major general and became a resident of Santa Barbara, California. He died at the age of 91 in Santa Barbara on March 29, 1959, and was buried at Santa Barbara Cemetery.

== Early life ==
William Lassiter was born in Petersburg, Virginia, on September 29, 1867, a son of Dr. Daniel W. Lassiter and Anna Rives (Heath) Lassiter. His siblings included Francis Rives Lassiter, who represented Virginia in the United States House of Representatives. Lassiter attended McCabe's University School in Petersburg in preparation for attendance at the United States Military Academy at West Point. He began studies at West Point in 1885 and graduated in 1889 ranked 23rd in his class of 49. Among his fellow graduates included several men who would become general officers, such as Charles Dudley Rhodes, Clement Flagler, Eben Eveleth Winslow, Frank Daniel Webster, Walter Augustus Bethel, Winthrop S. Wood, Chester Harding, William L. Kenly, Joseph D. Leitch, Edward McGlachlin Jr., George LeRoy Irwin, William Wright Harts, William G. Haan, Charles Crawford and William S. Graves. Charles Young was another distinguished graduate, becoming the first African American to attain the rank of colonel.

== Start of career ==
Lassiter was appointed a second lieutenant in the 4th Artillery and assigned to Jackson Barracks, Louisiana In February 1890 he was transferred to the 5th Artillery, and in March he was assigned to duty at Fort Schuyler, New York. In May 1890 he was reassigned to Fort Mason, California. In January 1891 he was transferred to the 1st Artillery, and in February he began duty at Fort Slocum, New York.

In September 1892, Lassiter was ordered to the Artillery School at Fort Monroe, Virginia as a student in the Artillery Officers Course. He graduated in September 1894 and returned to duty at Fort Slocum, where he remained until October 1895. In October 1895 he was transferred to Artillery duty at Fort Hamilton, New York, and in October 1896 he was assigned to Fort Sam Houston, Texas. In August 1897, Lassiter received promotion to first lieutenant.

== Spanish–American War ==
In March 1898, Lassiter's regiment moved to Galveston, Texas, in preparation for overseas service during the Spanish–American War. In April, the 1st Artillery moved to Tampa, Florida, with Lassiter assigned to the regiment's Light Battery K. The 1st Artillery served with the Fifth Army Corps in Cuba, and Lassiter took part in combat during the Siege of Santiago. He received the Citation Star for heroism at Santiago. When the Army replaced this award with the Silver Star in 1918, Lassiter's citation was converted to the new medal.

== Continued career ==
After his service in Cuba, Lassiter was assigned to West Point as an assistant instructor of tactics, where he served from August 1898 to July 1901. He was promoted to captain in February 1901. Lassiter commanded the 7th Field Artillery Battery at Fort Riley, Kansas, until December 1903. From 1904 to 1908, Lassiter was assigned as a member and of the Army board that developed and implemented an update to the Field Artillery Drill Regulations, and also served as the board's recorder. He also served as a member of the board that tested cannons and ammunition and made procurement and fielding recommendations. Lassiter was promoted to major in February 1908 and assigned to the 3rd Field Artillery.

Following his promotion to major, Lassiter was assigned to temporary duty in the Inspector General's office. He was inspector general of the Army of Cuban Pacification from August 1908 to April 1909. From April to August 1909 he was ordered to conduct special inspections of all Field Artillery regiments. Lassiter served in the Philippines until October 1910, and carried out duties as inspector general of Field Artillery, inspector general of the Department of the Visayas, and assistant to the inspector general of the Philippine Department.

Upon returning to the United States in early 1911, Lassiter was ordered to temporary duty as inspector general of the experimental Maneuver Division which conducted exercises and maneuvers at Fort Sam Houston. He then performed temporary duty at the Office of the Inspector General in Washington, D.C., and member of the staff at the War Department. In October 1911, Lassiter was assigned as a member of the U.S. Military Mission which was invited to observe army education and training in Germany, France, and England. He remained with the mission until March 1913. On March 16, Lassiter received promotion to lieutenant colonel.

Lassiter served with the 4th Field Artillery in Texas City, Texas, from March 1913 to April 1914. He participated with his regiment in the 1914 Occupation of Veracruz, Mexico, which resulted from tensions between the United States and Mexico during the Mexican Revolution. He was assigned to the 2nd Field Artillery in November 1914, and served at Fort Stotsenburg, Philippines until September 1916. In July 1916, Lassiter was promoted to colonel.

== World War I ==
From November 1916 to August 1917, Lassiter was the U.S. military attaché in London. In August 1917, four months after the American entry into World War I, he received a temporary promotion to brigadier general. Lassiter was then assigned to command Base Section Number 3 and all American troops in England, and he served until being reassigned in October.

Lassiter assumed command of the 51st Field Artillery Brigade in October 1917, and he led his unit during training in England and France, followed by combat in France. His brigade served as part of the 26th Division under first the French 11th Army Corps in Chemin des Dames and later the French 32nd Army Corps in the Toul Sector.

As the American Expeditionary Forces (AEF) continued to arrive in France during 1918, Lassiter was reassigned as chief of artillery for I Corps, and simultaneously oversaw the final organization and training of the 66th Field Artillery Brigade prior to its entry into combat. He then served with I Corps during offensive operations in the Toul area and the Battle of Château-Thierry, and took part in the summer 1918 Second Battle of the Marne. In August 1918, Lassiter was assigned as chief of artillery for IV Corps, where he took part in the Battle of Saint-Mihiel in September. He was promoted to temporary major general in August 1918.

In October 1918, Lassiter was assigned as chief of artillery for the Second Army, and he served during fighting in the Toul area until the Armistice that ended the war.

Later that month, Lassiter took command of the 32nd Division, which he led during the post-war occupation of the Rhineland.

For his wartime service, Lassiter received the Army Distinguished Service Medal. The citation reads:

The President of the United States of America, authorized by Act of Congress, July 9, 1918, takes pleasure in presenting the Army Distinguished Service Medal to Major General William Lassiter, United States Army, for exceptionally meritorious and distinguished services to the Government of the United States, in a duty of great responsibility during World War I. As Commander of the 51st Field Artillery Brigade, as Chief of Artillery of the Artillery of the 1st and 4th Army Corps in turn, and as Chief of Artillery, 2d Army, General Lassiter showed himself to be a leader of conspicuous ability. His energy and sound judgment influenced greatly the successful operations of his commands on the Vesle, at the St. Mihiel salient, and in the Toul sector. He later commanded with skill and marked success the 32d Infantry Division.

France awarded him the Croix de Guerre with two Palms and the Legion of Honor (Commander). In addition, England awarded him the Order of St Michael and St George (Knight Commander).

== Post-war ==
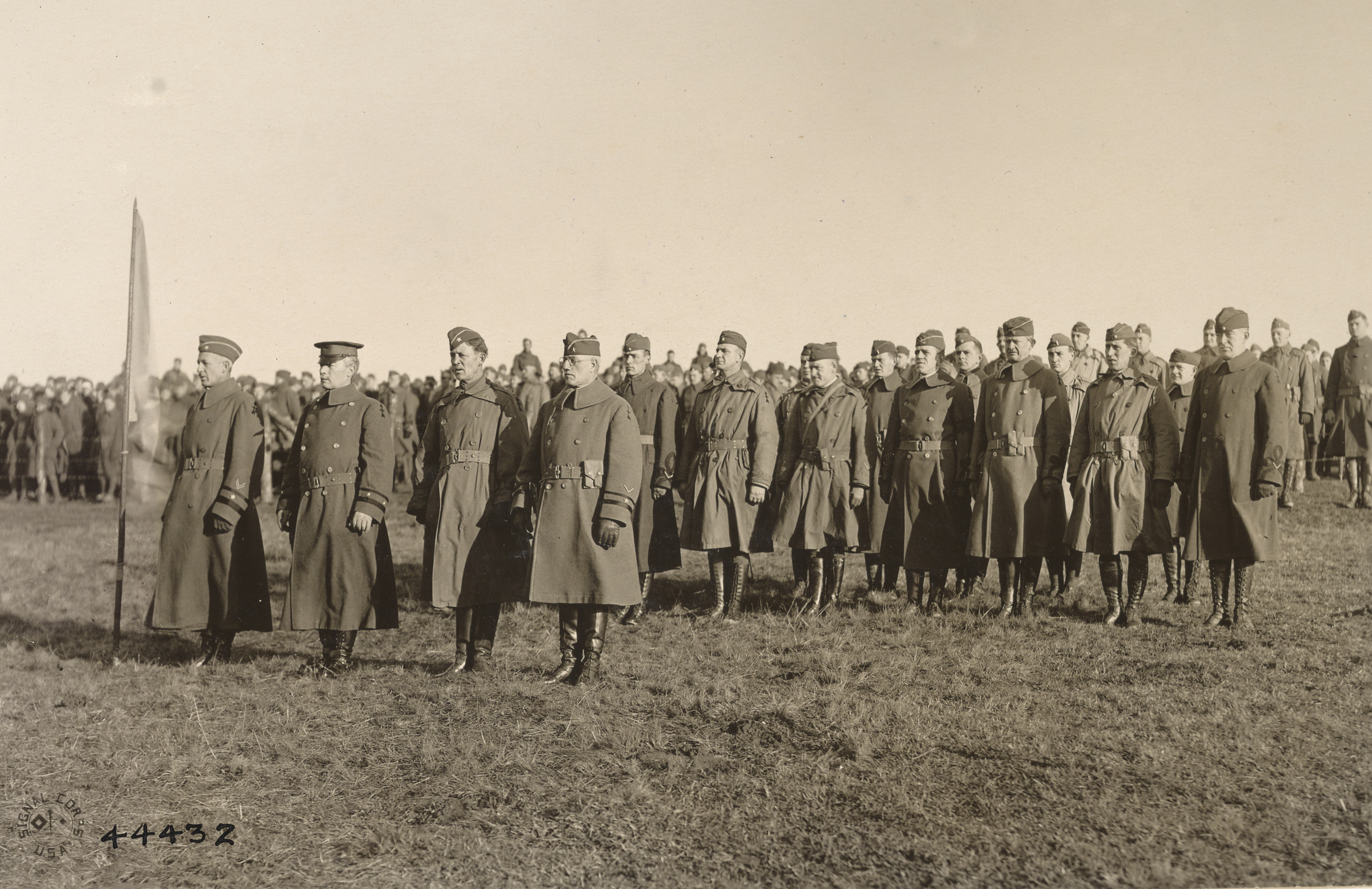
Major General William Lassiter, commanding the 32nd Division, along with senior division commanders and staff at the presentation of medals to men of the division at Dierdorf, Germany, December 1918.

While serving in Germany, Lassiter was assigned as chief of artillery for Third Army and served on a board which reviewed Army activities during the war to compile lessons learned and recommendations to improve future equipping and training. In the summer of 1919, he accompanied General John J. Pershing during victory parades in Paris and London. He returned to his permanent rank of colonel after returning to the United States in August 1919.

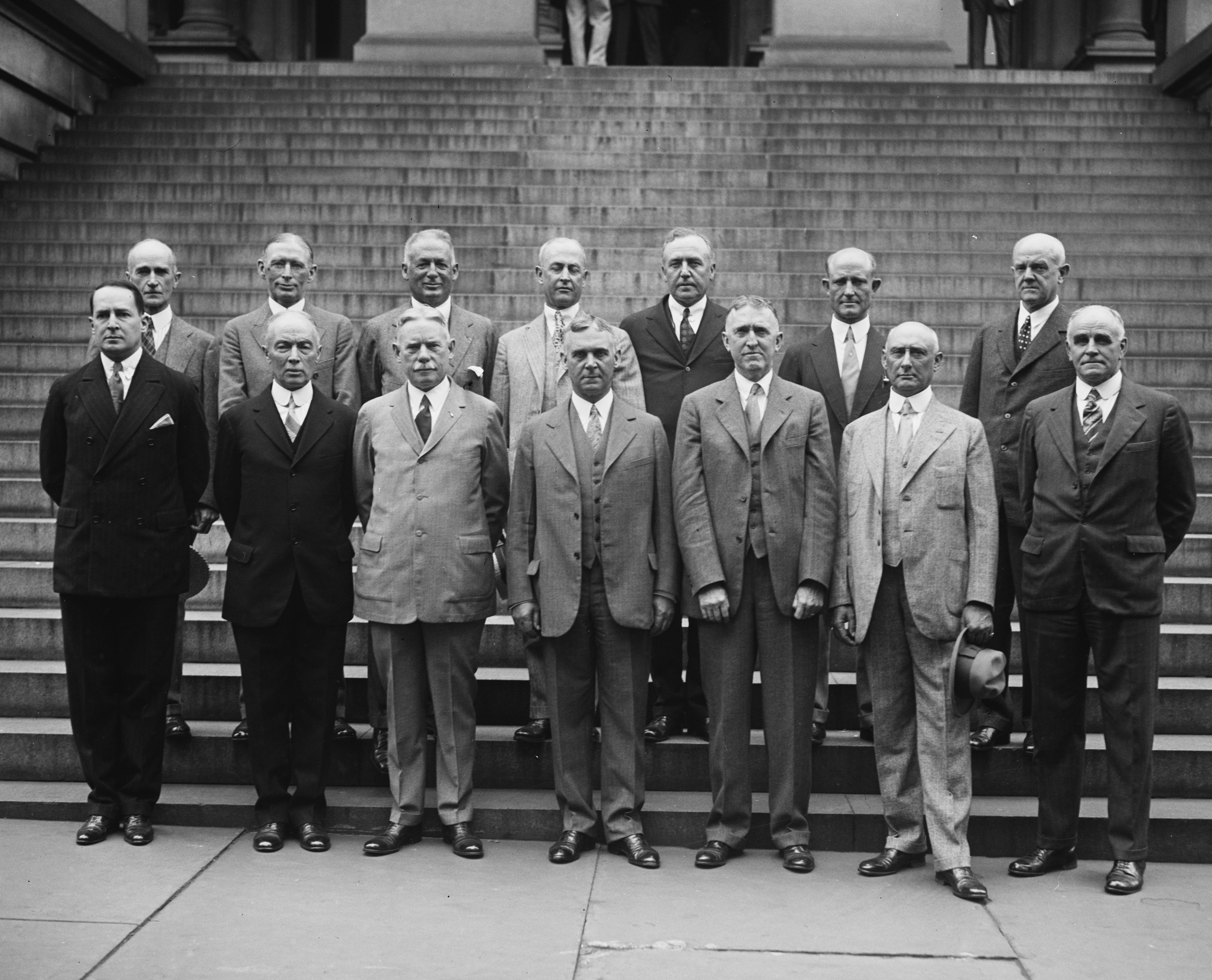
Corps area commanders and division commanders meet with the army chief of staff, Major General Charles P. Summerall, at the War Department, May 1927. Stood in the front row, second from the left, is Major General William Lassiter, commanding the 6th Corps Area.

Lassiter served on the War Department staff until September 1920. In August 1920, he received promotion to brigadier general. From September 1920 to September 1921, he was the commander of the Fort Knox, Kentucky, military post. From September 1921 to October 1923, Lassiter was the Army's assistant chief of staff for operations and training (G‑3). He was promoted to major general in December 1922.

From October 1923 to September 1924, Lassiter was assigned as commander of the Panama Canal Division. He then assumed command of the Panama Canal Department, which he led until January 13, 1926. From January to June 1926, Lassiter was president of the Tacna-Arica Arbitration Plebiscite Commission, succeeding Pershing in an international effort to mediate a longstanding territorial dispute between Chile and Peru.

Lassiter resumed command of the Panama Canal Department in June 1926, and remained until October 1926. He then performed temporary duty at the U.S. State Department in Washington, D.C., where he completed the activities of the plebiscite commission and submitted its final report. From March 1927 to March 1928, Lassiter commanded the Sixth Corps Area in Chicago. From April to October 1928 he commanded the Philippine Department. From December 1928 to July 1930 Lassiter commanded the Eighth Corps Area in San Antonio. He commanded the Hawaiian Department from October 1930 to September 1931.

== Retirement and death ==
Lassiter reached the mandatory retirement age of 64 in September 1931 and retired as a major general on September 30. On October 5, 1935, Lassiter and Jeannette Fallon Johnson (1884–1965) were married at a ceremony in London.

In retirement, Lassiter was a resident of Santa Barbara, California. He died in Santa Barbara on March 29, 1959. He was buried at Santa Barbara Cemetery.

Military offices
Preceded by William G. Haan	Commanding General 32nd Division; 1918−1919	Succeeded by Post deactivated
