= Clement Flagler =

United States Army general (1867–1922)

Clement Alexander Finley Flagler
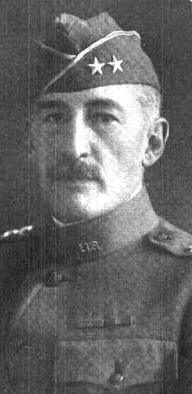
- Flagler as a division commander in World War I
- Born: August 17, 1867; Augusta, Georgia, U.S.
- Died: May 7, 1922 (aged 54); Baltimore, Maryland, U.S.
- Burial place: Arlington National Cemetery
- Relatives: Brigadier General Daniel Webster Flagler (1835–1899) (father); Brigadier General Clement Alexander Finley (maternal grandfather); Thomas D. Finley (first cousin)
- Military career
- Allegiance: United States
- Branch: United States Army
- Service years: 1889–1922
- Rank: Major General
- Nickname: Sioux
- Commands: 7th Engineer Regiment; 5th Infantry Division Artillery; III Corps Artillery; 42nd (Rainbow) Infantry Division; United States Army Engineer School
- Conflicts: Spanish–American War; Pancho Villa Expedition; World War I
- Awards: Legion of Honor; Croix de Guerre

Clement Alexander Finley Flagler (August 17, 1867 – May 7, 1922) was a United States Army Major General who was noteworthy as regimental, brigade and division commander in World War I.

The son of Daniel Webster Flagler and grandson of Clement Alexander Finley, Clement Flagler graduated from Iowa's Griswold College in 1885 and the United States Military Academy in 1889. Commissioned as an Engineer officer, Flagler served on the West Point faculty and then carried out a series of Engineer assignments, with a specialty in rivers and harbors construction. He took part in the Spanish–American War and the Pancho Villa Expedition, and was a graduate of the Army War College.

During World War I, Flagler became a temporary major general and commanded the 7th Engineer Regiment, 5th Infantry Division Artillery, III Corps Artillery, and the 42nd (Rainbow) Infantry Division. He was a recipient of both the French Legion of Honor and Croix de Guerre in recognition of his wartime achievements.

After the war, Flagler reverted to his permanent rank of colonel, and resumed his career as an Engineer officer. He died in Baltimore, Maryland, and was buried at Arlington National Cemetery, in Arlington, Virginia.

== Early life ==
He was born Clement Alexander Finley Flagler in Augusta, Georgia, the son of Brigadier General Daniel Webster Flagler, for whom Fort Flagler, Washington was named.

The younger Flagler was named for his maternal grandfather, Army Surgeon General Clement Alexander Finley. Known as Clement Flagler, Clement A.F. Flagler, and C.A.F Flagler, he grew up in Iowa while his father commanded the Rock Island Arsenal.

In 1885 he received a Bachelor of Science degree from Griswold College. He then accepted appointment to the United States Military Academy (USMA) at West Point, New York, after being recommended by Congressman Jerry Murphy. He graduated in 1889, and Flagler's high class ranking (third in a class of 49) enabled him to obtain a sought after position in the Army's Engineer branch. Among his fellow graduates included several men who would become general officers, such as Charles Dudley Rhodes, William S. Graves, Eben Eveleth Winslow, Frank Daniel Webster, Walter Augustus Bethel, Winthrop S. Wood, Chester Harding, William L. Kenly, Joseph D. Leitch, Edward McGlachlin Jr., George LeRoy Irwin, William Wright Harts, William G. Haan, Charles Crawford and William Lassiter. Charles Young was another distinguished graduate, becoming the first African American to attain the rank of colonel.

While at West Point Flagler was nicknamed "Sioux" as a testament to his dark eyes, hair, and complexion, his having been raised in Iowa, and his self-professed Native American heritage, and his classmates used it with him for the rest of his life.

== Start of military career ==
Assigned as an Engineer officer, Flagler served as instructor in civil and military engineering at West Point, and as engineer officer at Chickamauga, Georgia.

== Spanish–American War ==
During the Spanish–American War Flagler was temporarily promoted to major and assigned as engineer officer on the staff of the U.S. Army commander in Puerto Rico.

== Post–Spanish–American War ==
Following the Spanish–American War Flagler continued to carry out Engineer assignments, including serving as officer in charge of the federal lighthouse district based in Philadelphia, Pennsylvania and a posting as chief engineering officer for the Army's Department of the East. Flagler also played a role in choosing the route for enlarging the Delaware and Chesapeake Canal.

In 1914 Flagler graduated from the Army War College.

After his War College graduation Flagler served as engineer officer for the District of Columbia Engineer District.

== Pancho Villa Expedition ==
During Mexican border skirmishes of 1914–1916, Flagler served on General Funston's staff in the Vera Cruz Expedition.

== World War I ==
Shortly after the American entry into World War I, in April 1917, Flagler was, on May 15, promoted to the rank of colonel. Two months later, when a new regiment of engineers, the 7th, was being raised, he was assigned to command the new regiment. In December of that year the 7th Engineers was assigned to the 5th Division, then in its early stages of creation and commanded by Major General John E. McMahon. Flagler left his regiment soon afterwards, to take command of the 5th Field Artillery Brigade, also part of the 5th Division, and having under its command the 19th, 20th, and 21st Field Artillery Regiments. At the time the brigade was stationed at Camp Stanley, Leon Springs, Texas.

Having assumed command of the brigade on December 31, Flagler received another promotion, this time to the rank of brigadier general, on February 7, 1918. With the Western Front as its destination, the brigade began to depart from the United States in May, several weeks after the 5th Division's two infantry brigades. Upon its arrival in France, the brigade journeyed to Camp la Valdahon to receive instruction before rejoining the rest of the division in the St. Die sector of the Vosges region of France. Flagler was still in command of the brigade during the division's first major action, which came in September when it participated in the Battle of Saint-Mihiel, and in the Meuse–Argonne offensive the following month.

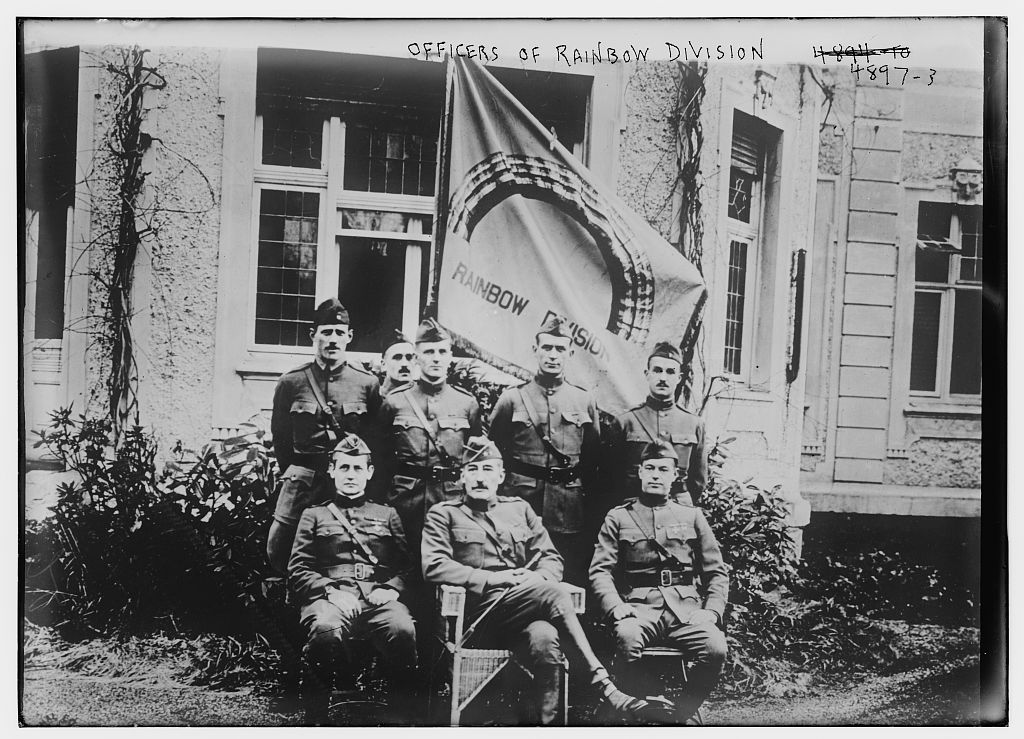
Officers of the 42nd "Rainbow" Division in Germany, 1919. Flagler, the 42nd's commander, is seated in the center.

Flagler was relieved in command of the brigade on October 9 by Brigadier General William C. Rivers upon receiving a new appointment, to command the artillery units of III Corps, then commanded by Major General Robert Lee Bullard until Major General John L. Hines succeeded him a few days later. He was promoted again, this time to the rank of major general, on October 17, and continued to command the corps artillery until the Armistice with Germany on November 11, which brought an end to the war. Eleven days later he received another assignment when he took command of the 42nd "Rainbow" Division, taking over from Brigadier General Douglas MacArthur.

== Post World War I ==
After World War I Flagler served as commandant of the Army's Engineer School at Camp Humphreys, Virginia and then chief engineer of the department based in Honolulu, Hawaii.

In 1921 Flagler was assigned to Baltimore as chief engineer of the Eastern Division, the post in which he was serving when he died.

== Military awards ==
General Flagler was a recipient of the Legion of Honor and the Croix de Guerre for his World War I service.

== Death and interment ==
General Flagler died at Johns Hopkins Hospital in Baltimore and was buried at Arlington National Cemetery, in Arlington County, Virginia.

== Family ==
In 1897, Flagler married Mrs. Caroline DeWitt Quinan (1870–1938) in Salt Lake City. Caroline DeWitt had children with her first husband, William R. Quinan, from whom she was divorced in 1896, but none with Flagler.

== Legacy ==
Flagler Road, which runs between 18th and 21st Streets at Fort Belvoir, and includes the post headquarters, is named for him. Fort Belvoir was previously the location of the Army Engineer Center and School, and several streets and buildings there are named for prominent Engineer officers.

Military offices
Preceded by Jay Johnson Morrow	Commandant of the United States Army Engineer School; 1919–1920	Succeeded by William D. Connor
