= William S. Graves =

American general (1865–1940)

William Sidney Graves
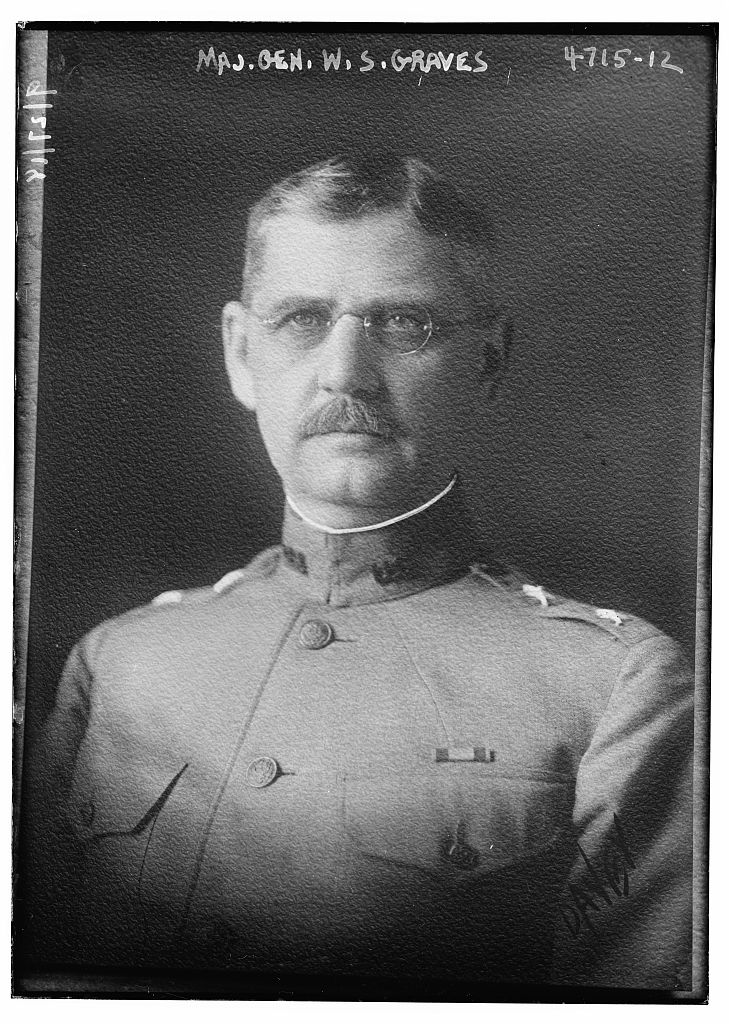
- William S. Graves, wearing the two stars of a major general, pictured here in 1918
- Born: March 27, 1865; Mount Calm, Texas, Confederate States of America
- Died: February 27, 1940 (aged 74); Shrewsbury, New Jersey, United States
- Burial place: Arlington National Cemetery, Virginia, United States
- Military career
- Allegiance: United States
- Branch: United States Army
- Service years: 1889–1928
- Rank: Major General
- Service number: 0-53
- Unit: Infantry Branch
- Commands: Panama Canal Division; Sixth Corps Area; 1st Division; 1st Brigade; 8th Division; American Expeditionary Force, Siberia
- Conflicts: Spanish–American War; Philippine–American War; World War I Russian Civil War: Siberian intervention
- Awards: Army Distinguished Service Medal; Philippine Campaign Medal; World War I Victory Medal; Order of the Rising Sun (Japan); Order of Wen-Hu; Order of the Crown of Italy; Czechoslovak War Cross
- Other work: Author

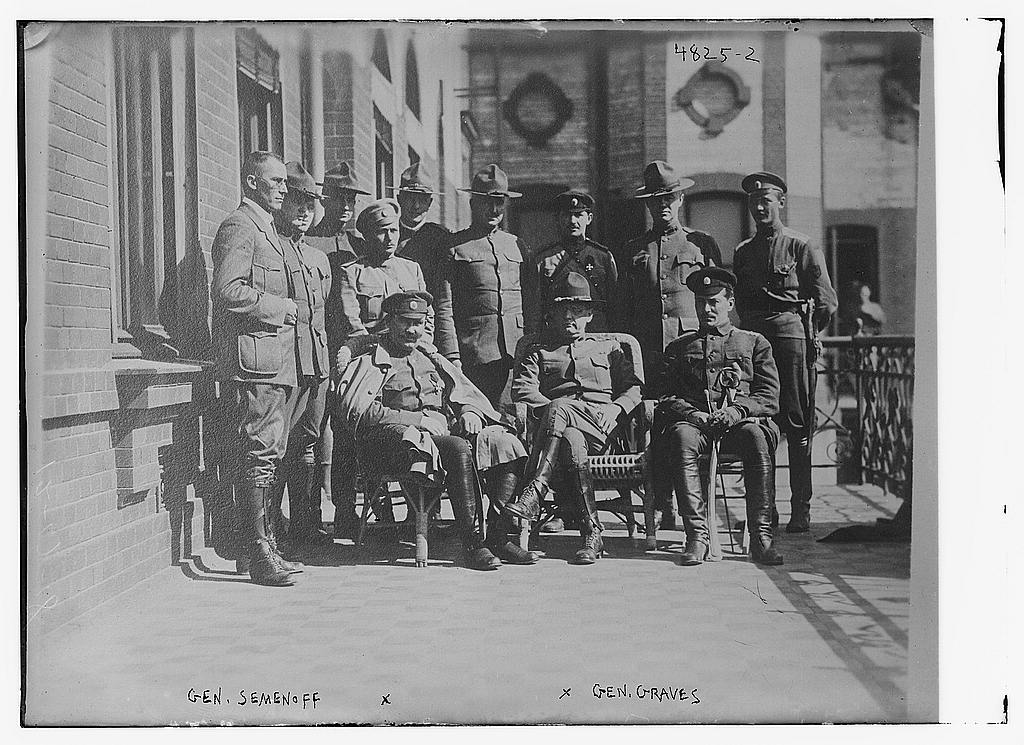
Graves and Grigory Semyonov in 1918

Major General William Sidney Graves (March 27, 1865 – February 27, 1940) was a United States Army officer who commanded American forces in Siberia during the Siberian Expedition, part of the Allied Intervention in Russia, towards the end of World War I.

== Early life and education ==
He was born on March 27, 1865, in Mount Calm, Texas, to the Reverend Andrew Carrol, a Southern Baptist minister and Evelyn Bennett. Graves began attendance at the United States Military Academy (USMA) at West Point, New York, in 1884, although he caught pneumonia and missed his plebe year as a result. Nevertheless, he continued to attend and ultimately graduated forty-second in a class of forty-nine on June 12, 1889. Among his fellow graduates included several men who would become general officers, such as Charles Dudley Rhodes, Clement Flagler, Eben Eveleth Winslow, Frank Daniel Webster, Walter Augustus Bethel, Winthrop S. Wood, Chester Harding, William L. Kenly, Joseph D. Leitch, Edward McGlachlin Jr., George LeRoy Irwin, William Wright Harts, William G. Haan, Charles Crawford and William Lassiter. Charles Young was another distinguished graduate, becoming the first African American to attain the rank of colonel.

== Marriage ==
Graves married Katherine Pauline "Kate" Boyd, daughter of William Lang and Augusta Josephine (née Merriam) Boyd, at St. Mark's Episcopal Church in Cheyenne, Wyoming, on February 9, 1891. Katherine was the niece of his commanding officer, Henry C. Merriam.

== Military career ==
He served in the Spanish–American War in the Philippines until 1902. He fought at the Battle of Caloocan as a company commander during the insurrection. He was the assistant chief of the Army General Staff.

In 1918, the year after the American entry into World War I, he was given command of the 8th Division and sent to Siberia under direct orders from President Woodrow Wilson. He landed on September 1, 1918. His orders were to remain strictly apolitical amidst a politically turbulent situation. As a result, he was frequently at odds with his Allied peers, the State Department, and various Russian groups.

Given some 7,000 soldiers in what was called the American Expeditionary Forces (A.E.F.), and aided by Joseph D. Leitch as his chief of staff, he settled on the idea of making sure the Trans-Siberian railroad stayed operational and brought in a number of railroad experts to run the railway. His troops did not intervene in the Russian Civil War despite strong pressure brought on him to help the White army of Admiral Kolchak. Early on, Graves developed a strong distaste for Kolchak and his government.

Graves thought that the British, French, and Japanese forces in Siberia were all following self-serving political ambitions beyond the stated goals of the Allies, which were to protect supplies provided by the powers to their erstwhile Tsarist allies and to provide for the safe conduct of foreign allied troops, primarily Czechs, who were to exit Russia via Vladivostok. Graves believed that the British and French were trying to suppress Bolshevik forces. He also believed that the Japanese had plans to annex part of Eastern Siberia (the Amur region, east of Lake Baikal). The Japanese deployed an estimated 72,000 soldiers—some 6 times the authorized troop level of 12,000 set by the Allies.

U.S. forces operated the Trans-Siberian railroad for almost two years, while bandits roamed the Siberian countryside and the political situation turned chaotic. The U.S. military did accomplish its main objective and the entire Czech Legion was evacuated out of Russia via Vladivostok. The last U.S. soldiers left Siberia on April 1, 1920. Historian Benson Bobrick wrote of Graves: "In the whole sad debacle, he may have been the only honorable man."

General Graves was promoted to the rank of major general on July 11, 1925, and retired from the army in 1928. He then wrote a book about his time in Siberia, entitled America's Siberian Adventure 1918-20.

== Family ==
William and Kate had four children, two of whom survived their parents. The first two children are buried at Fort Logan National Cemetery in Denver, Colorado: a newborn infant (died October 27, 1891) and a girl, Marjorie (November 19, 1892 – February 24, 1894).

A son, Sidney Carroll Graves (1893–1974) graduated from West Point in 1915 and followed his father into a military career, attaining the rank of major. He earned two Distinguished Service Crosses: the first during World War I, and the second while serving in the Russian Expeditionary Force. In 1921 he married Olga Roosevelt (Bayne), a relative of President Theodore Roosevelt. Olga's grandfather, Robert Barnwell Roosevelt, and the president's father, Theodore Roosevelt Sr., were brothers.

The youngest child, Dorothy, married William R. Orton.

== Awards ==
His awards included the Army Distinguished Service Medal, the citation for which reads:

The President of the United States of America, authorized by Act of Congress, July 9, 1918, takes pleasure in presenting the Army Distinguished Service Medal to Major General William Sidney Graves, United States Army, for exceptionally meritorious and distinguished services to the Government of the United States, in a duty of great responsibility during World War I, as an Executive Assistant to the Chief of Staff and as Commanding General of the American Expeditionary Forces in Siberia.

== Death ==
Graves died on February 27, 1940, in Shrewsbury, New Jersey.

== Legacy ==
His papers are held in the Hoover Institution Archives at Stanford University.
