= Edward McGlachlin Jr. =

United States Army general

Edward F. McGlachlin Jr.
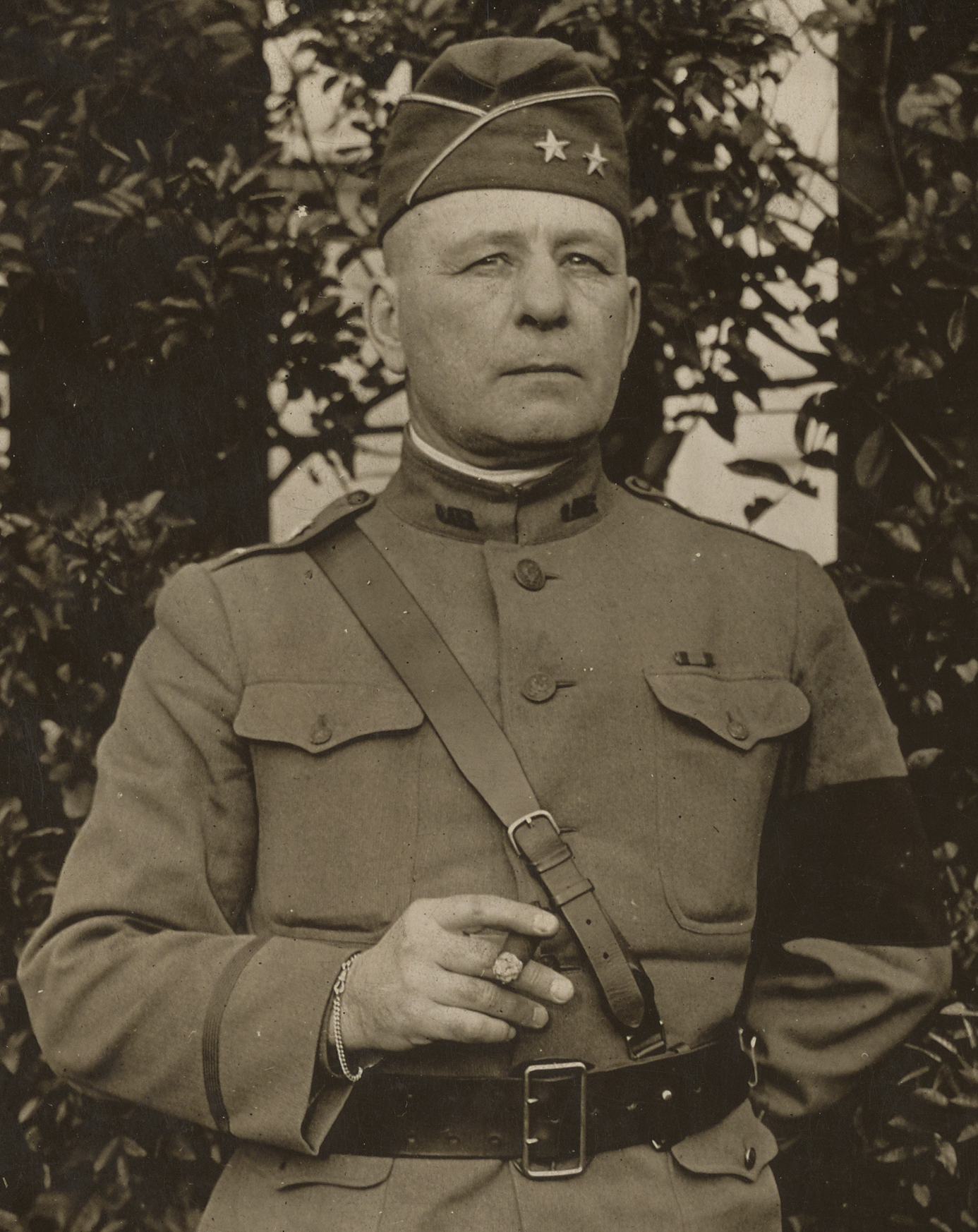
- Edward McGlachlin, pictured here in December 1918.
- Born: June 9, 1868; Fond du Lac, Wisconsin, U.S.
- Died: November 9, 1946 (aged 78); Washington, D.C., U.S.
- Burial place: West Point Cemetery, West Point, New York, United States
- Military career
- Allegiance: United States
- Branch: United States Army
- Service years: 1889–1923
- Rank: Major General
- Unit: Field Artillery Branch
- Commands: 1st Battalion, 4th Field Artillery Regiment; 2nd Field Artillery Regiment; United States Army Field Artillery School; 165th Field Artillery Brigade; 57th Field Artillery Brigade; 66th Field Artillery Brigade; 1st Division; 7th Division; United States Army War College
- Conflicts: Moro Rebellion; World War I Allied occupation of the Rhineland
- Awards: Army Distinguished Service Medal; Silver Star; Legion of Honor (Commander) (France); Croix de Guerre (with palm) (France).

Major General Edward Fenton McGlachlin Jr. (June 9, 1868 – November 9, 1946) was a United States Army officer who distinguished himself during World War I.

== Early life ==
Edward Fenton McGlachlin Jr. was born in Fond du Lac, Wisconsin on June 9, 1868, the son of Mary Eliza Lawrence and Edward McGlachlin, a Union Army veteran of the American Civil War and a newspaper publisher. The younger McGlachlin was educated in Wisconsin, and graduated 20th in a class of 49 from the United States Military Academy (USMA) at West Point, New York in June 1889. Among his fellow graduates included several men who would become general officers, such as Charles Dudley Rhodes, Clement Flagler, Eben Eveleth Winslow, Frank Daniel Webster, Walter Augustus Bethel, Winthrop S. Wood, Chester Harding, William L. Kenly, Joseph D. Leitch, William S. Graves, George LeRoy Irwin, William Wright Harts, William G. Haan, Charles Crawford and William Lassiter. Charles Young was another distinguished graduate, becoming the first African American to attain the rank of colonel.

Assigned to the Field Artillery, McGlachlin carried out a variety of assignments in the United States and overseas, including command of the 87th Coast Artillery Company at Fort Slocum, New York; the 30th Field Artillery Battery at Forts Walla Walla, Snelling; and the 28th Battery at Leavenworth. In 1904 he was ordered to the Philippines during the U.S. occupation, and received the Silver Star Citation for heroism at the First Battle of Bud Dajo during the Moro Rebellion. From 1907 to 1909 he commanded the 1st Battalion, 4th Field Artillery at Vancouver Barracks.

From 1909 to 1911, McGlachlin commanded the recruit depot at Fort McDowell, California. From 1912 to 1914, he served as commander of the 2nd Field Artillery at Vancouver Barracks and in the Philippines. He was commandant of the Field Artillery School from 1914 to 1916. McGlachlin graduated from the Army War College in 1917.

== World War I ==
McGlachlin was promoted to brigadier general on August 5, 1917, almost four months after the American entry into World War I, and commanded the 165th Field Artillery Brigade, 90th Division at Camp Travis, Texas during its initial organization and training.

In December 1917 he assumed command of the 57th Field Artillery Brigade, 32nd Division at Camp MacArthur, Texas. Upon arriving in France in March 1918, he was assigned to command of the 66th Field Artillery Brigade, 31st Division.

McGlachlin was subsequently promoted to major general and assigned as Chief of Artillery for I Corps. He was later appointed Chief of Artillery for the First Army, and he served in that position until the end of the war on Armistice with Germany on November 11, 1918. He commanded the 1st Division near the end of the war, and American Forces in Germany during the post-war Allied occupation of the Rhineland.

He was awarded the Army Distinguished Service Medal for his wartime service, as well as the French Legion of Honor (Commander) and Croix de Guerre (with palm).

=== Army Distinguished Service Medal citation ===
His award citation reads:

The President of the United States of America, authorized by Act of Congress, July 9, 1918, takes pleasure in presenting the Army Distinguished Service Medal to Major General Edward F. McGlachlin Jr., United States Army, for exceptionally meritorious and distinguished services to the Government of the United States, in a duty of great responsibility during World War I. As Commander of the Artillery of the 1st Army in its organization and subsequent operations General McGlachlin solved the difficult problems involved with rare military judgment. In the St. Mihiel and Argonne-Meuse offensives his qualities as a leader were demonstrated by the effective employment of Artillery that was planned and conducted under his direction. He later commanded with great ability and success the 1st Infantry Division, American Expeditionary Forces.

== Post-World War I ==
After the war, McGlachlin reverted to the permanent rank of colonel; he was promoted to brigadier general in 1921, and major general in 1922. His assignments included command of the 7th Division at Camp Funston, Kansas, and later Camp Meade, Maryland. In 1921 he was assigned as commandant of the Army War College, where he remained until retiring in 1923. During this period his aide-de-camp was Floyd Lavinius Parks, who would later become a lieutenant general after World War II.

== Death and burial ==
McGlachlin died at Walter Reed General Hospital in Washington, DC on November 9, 1946. He was buried at West Point Cemetery.

== Family ==
In 1892, McGlachlin married Louise Harrison Chew. Their children included Helen (1895–1990), the wife of Colonel John E. Hatch; Fenton (1893–1917), a U.S. Army captain; and Elizabeth (1904–1934), the wife of Brigadier General Joseph C. Odell.

Military offices
Preceded by Dan T. Moore	Commandant of the United States Army Field Artillery School; 1914–1916	Succeeded by William J. Snow
Preceded by Frank Parker	Commanding General 1st Division; 1918–1919	Succeeded by Charles P. Summerall
Preceded by Lutz Wahl	Commanding General 7th Division; 1919–1920	Succeeded by Charles J. Bailey
Preceded by James W. McAndrew	Commandant of the United States Army War College; 1921–1923	Succeeded by Hanson E. Ely
