= Thomas D. Finley =

U.S. Army major general

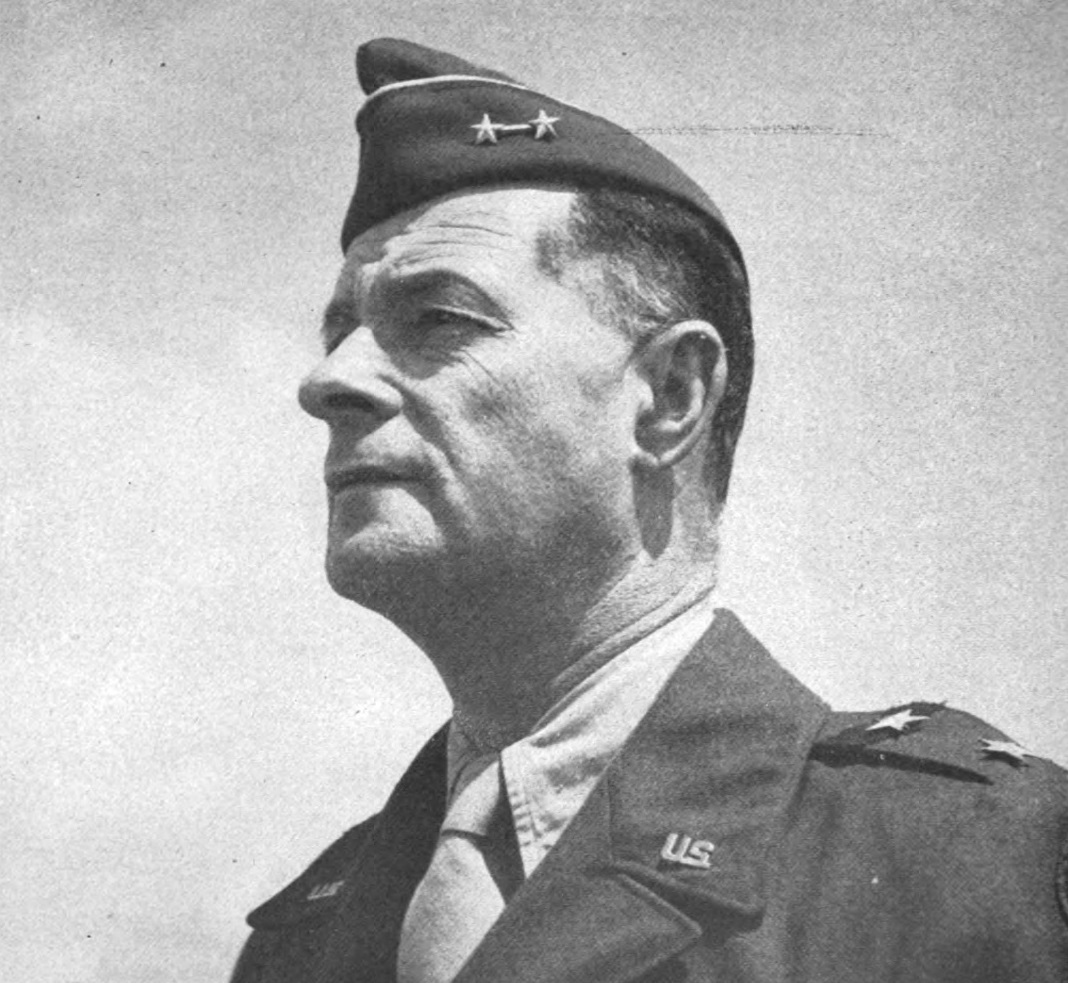
- From 1947's The 89th Infantry Division, 1942-1945
- Born: June 2, 1895; Annapolis, Maryland, U.S.
- Died: December 19, 1984 (aged 89); Colorado Springs, Colorado, U.S.
- Burial place: West Point Cemetery
- Education: United States Military Academy; United States Army Command and General Staff College; United States Army War College
- Spouse: Constance Bonner Bissell (m. 1931–1968)
- Children: 2
- Relatives: Clement Finley (grandfather); Clement Flagler (first cousin)
- Military career
- Service: United States Army
- Service years: 1916–1946
- Rank: Major General
- Service number: 04419
- Units: U.S. Army Corps of Engineers; U.S. Army Infantry Branch
- Commands: Company D, 7th Engineer Regiment; 2nd Battalion, 7th Engineer Regiment; I Corps Engineer School; 2nd Battalion, 112th Engineer Regiment; Company M, 12th Infantry Regiment; 89th Infantry Division; XVI Corps
- Conflicts: Mexican Border War; World War I Occupation of the Rhineland; World War II
- Awards: Army Distinguished Service Medal; Legion of Merit (2); Bronze Star Medal; Legion of Honor (Chevalier) (France); Croix de Guerre (France)

Thomas D. Finley (June 2, 1895 – December 19, 1984) was a career officer in the United States Army. A veteran of the Mexican Border War, World War I, and World War II, he served from 1916 to 1946 and attained the rank of major general as the Second World War commander of the 89th Infantry Division. Finley's U.S. awards included the Army Distinguished Service Medal, two awards of the Legion of Merit, and the Bronze Star Medal. His foreign awards and decorations included the French Legion of Honor (Chevalier) and Croix de Guerre with palm.

Finley was born in Annapolis, Maryland and was educated at various army posts as the Finley family traveled for his father's career. He graduated from high school at the Pennsylvania Military College in 1911, and from the United States Military Academy (West Point) in 1916. Assigned to the Corps of Engineers, he served in Texas during the Mexican Border War. During World War I, he commanded 2nd Battalion, 7th Engineer Regiment and the I Corps Engineer School in France. After the war, he transferred to the Infantry Branch, and he carried out staff and command assignments throughout the 1920s and 1930s, including member of the faculty at the Infantry School and professor of modern languages at West Point.

During World War II, Finley was assistant division commander of the 89th Infantry Division as a brigadier general, followed by promotion to major general and assignment as commander of the division. He led the 89th Division during combat in Europe during 1944 and 1945. After the German surrender, he commanded XVI Corps, then returned to the United States, where he was retired for disability in 1946.

In retirement, Finley resided in Colorado Springs, Colorado. He died in Colorado Springs on December 19, 1984. After cremation, some of his ashes were scattered at nearby Fort Carson and some were buried at West Point Cemetery.

== Early life ==
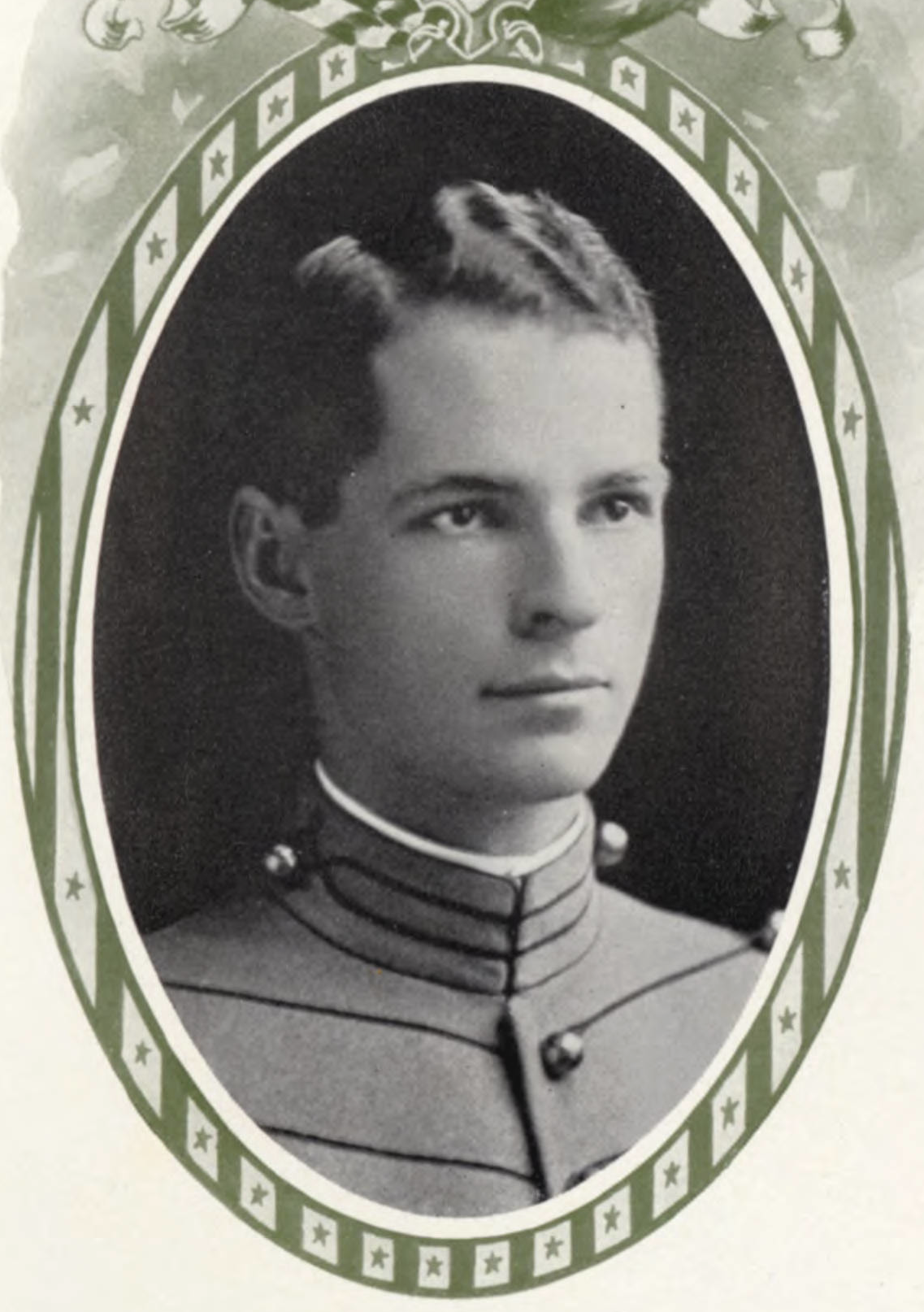
Finley as a West Point Cadet in 1916.

Thomas DeWees Finley was born in Annapolis, Maryland on June 2, 1895, a son of Colonel Walter Lowrie Finley and Louise S. (DeWees) Finley. Clement Finley was his grandfather and Clement Flagler was his first cousin. In addition, U.S. Representative Samuel Moore was his great-grandfather. Finley and his twin brother James Randlett Finley were educated at various military posts as their family moved for Walter Finley's career, and they completed high school at the Pennsylvania Military College (now Widener University) in 1911. (Note: James Finley attended George Washington University from 1915 to 1916. He received an army direct commission in December 1916 and attained the rank of lieutenant colonel before being medically retired in 1942. Apparently despondent over failing health, he committed suicide in 1949.) At graduation, Finley received the Theodore Hyatt Medal for Scholarship in recognition of his academic achievements.

Finley obtained an appointment to the United States Military Academy at West Point and began attendance in 1912. In 1913, he was among several cadets who were disciplined following discovery of several incidents in which upperclassmen were found to have hazed underclassmen. In 1916, West Point fielded its first-ever tennis team; Finley was selected as a member and subsequently chosen to serve as the team captain. Finley graduated in June 1916, ranked eighth in a class of 125 cadets, and among his classmates who also attained general officer rank were Wilhelm D. Styer, Dwight Johns, Stanley E. Reinhart, Louis E. Hibbs, Ludson D. Worsham, Horace L. McBride, Robert Neyland, William M. Hoge, William R. Woodward, James A. Pickering, William Spence, Robert B. McBride Jr., Paul Vincent Kane, Fay B. Prickett, Calvin DeWitt Jr., Joseph M. Tully, Thomas L. Martin, Roland P. Shugg, James J. O'Hare and Otto F. Lange. His high class standing enabled him to obtain a second lieutenant's commission in the Corps of Engineers, the branch choice of most top tier graduates.

== Start of career ==
After receiving his commission, Finley was assigned to the 1st Regiment of Engineers, which performed duty at Eagle Pass, Texas during the Mexican Border War. He was promoted to first lieutenant in July 1916, and remained with the 1st Engineers until May 1917, a few weeks after the American entry into World War I, when he was promoted to captain and assigned to command Company D, 7th Engineer Regiment at Fort Leavenworth, Kansas. With the army expanding due to the nationsl's entry into the war, in September 1917 Finley was appointed regimental adjutant, and he served in this position during the regiment's training for combat and movement to France. The 7th Engineers arrived in Rimaucourt, France, in April 1918, and in May Finley was promoted to temporary major and assigned to command the regiment's 2nd Battalion.

In August, Finley was appointed to command the I Corps Engineer School at Gondrecourt-le-Château. He directed this school until the armistice of 11 November 1918 ended the war, and remained in this position during the early stages of the Allied occupation of the Rhineland. From January to February 1919, Finley commanded the 2nd Battalion, 112th Engineer Regiment. From March to June 1919, he performed staff duty with the Advance Section of the Services of Supply of the American Expeditionary Forces at Neufchâteau, Vosges. He was then posted to Rumelange, Luxembourg, where he resumed command of the 2nd Battalion, 7th Engineers, which he led through its return to the United States and demobilization at Camp Gordon, Georgia in June 1920. He returned to his permanent rank of captain on June 30, 1920.

== Continued career ==
From June to September 1920, Finley was a student in a special engineering course for army officers at the Massachusetts Institute of Technology. On July 1, 1920, he was transferred from the Engineers to the Infantry. From June 1920 to September 1921, he attended the qualification course for Infantry officers at the Fort Benning, Georgia Infantry School. He was promoted again to temporary major in February 1921. In the summer of 1921, he performed duty with the 34th Infantry Regiment and the Citizens' Military Training Camp at Fort Meade, Maryland. From September 1921 to January 1922, he served with the 34th Infantry at Madison Barracks, New York.

From September 1921 to January 1922, Finley was a student at the British Army's Machine Gun School in Seaford, East Sussex. After returning to the United States, he was an instructor in machine gun tactics at the Infantry School. He remained in this position until June 1924, and he returned to his permanent rank of captain in November 1922. From June 1924 to July 1926, he commanded Company M, 12th Infantry Regiment at Fort Washington, Maryland, which included duty in Philadelphia during the 1926 Sesquicentennial Exposition. He was promoted to major on June 24, 1926.

From August 1926 to August 1927, Finley was a student in France, first in a French language course, then at L'Ecole des Chars de Combat (French Battle Tank School) in Versailles. From August 1927 to August 1931, Finley was assistant professor and associate professor of modern languages on the West Point faculty. He attended the United States Army Command and General Staff College beginning in August 1931, and graduated in May 1933. From May 1933 to August 1934, he was first plans, operations, and training officer (S-3) of the 11th Infantry Regiment at Fort Benjamin Harrison, Indiana, and he later served as the regimental executive officer. From August 1934 to June 1935, he was a student at the United States Army War College. From July 1935 to June 1939, he was head of the Western European Section in the Military Intelligence Division (G-2) of the Army General Staff. He was promoted to lieutenant colonel in July 1937.

== Later career ==
From June 1939 to June 1940, Finley was assistant professor of military science and tactics at the University of Maryland, College Park. With the army planning for eventual U.S. participation in World War II, from August 1940 to May 1941, he was chief of the coordinating section in the Army G-2's Liaison Branch. From May to November 1941, Finley was assigned to the Infantry Replacement Center at Camp Croft, South Carolina, where he served as the post's executive officer. He was promoted to temporary colonel in June 1941. From November 1941 to April 1942, he served on the plans and operations staff (G-3) of Second United States Army in Memphis, Tennessee. In April 1942, Finley was promoted to temporary brigadier general and assigned as assistant division commander of the 89th Infantry Division at Camp Carson, Colorado. He served in this position during the division's training at Fort Hunter Liggett, California and Camp Polk, Louisiana.

In February 1943, Finley was appointed commander of the 89th Infantry Division, and he was promoted to temporary major general the following month. After completing training at Camp Butner, North Carolina in May 1944, the 89th Division entered combat in France, and he led the organization during fighting in France, Luxembourg, and Germany. After the German surrender in May 1945, he continued to command the 89th Division and also acted as commander of XVI Corps from October to December 1945. After returning to the United States in January 1946, Finley underwent medical evaluation, and he was retired for disability in September 1946.

=== Awards ===
Finley's awards included the Army Distinguished Service Medal; Legion of Merit with oak leaf cluster; Bronze Star Medal; Legion of Honor (Chevalier) (France), and Croix de Guerre (France).

== Retirement and death ==
In retirement, Finley resided in the Broadmoor neighborhood of Colorado Springs, Colorado, where his civic activities included service on the board of directors of the Broadmoor Improvement Society. In addition, he was a director of the Humane Society of Colorado Springs. He also served as president and chairman of the board of the Broadmoor Fire Protection District. In 1971, he was an organizer and original board of directors member of the Fort Carson Foundation, which was created to provide military members and their families recreational and educational programs beyond what were available through official channels. Finley was president of the 89th Division Society, and took part in numerous organization activities, including reunions.

Finley died in Colorado Springs on December 19, 1984. He was cremated, with some ashes scattered at Fort Carson and some buried at West Point Cemetery.

== Family ==
In 1931, Finley married Constance Bonner Bissell, who died in 1968. They were the parents of two children, son David and daughter Renette. David DeWees Finley graduated from West Point in 1955, and later completed master's and doctoral degrees at Stanford University. He was a longtime member of the political science faculty at Colorado College. Renette Ter Bush Finley graduated from Stanford and was the wife of first army officer Gordon B. Rogers Jr. and later James R. Cost. A longtime resident of Santa Fe, New Mexico, she was also active in real estate sales.

== Effective dates of rank ==
- Second Lieutenant (Regular Army), July 1, 1916
- First Lieutenant (Regular Army), July 1, 1916
- Captain (Regular Army), May 15, 1917
- Major (National Army), May 23, 1918
- Captain (Regular Army), June 30, 1920
- Major (National Army), February 16, 1921
- Captain (Regular Army), November 4, 1922
- Major (Regular Army), June 24, 1926
- Lieutenant Colonel (Regular Army), July 1, 1937
- Colonel (Army of the United States), June 26, 1941
- Brigadier General (Army of the United States), April 23, 1942
- Major General (Army of the United States), March 15, 1943
- Colonel (Regular Army), August 1, 1944
- Major General (Retired), September 30, 1946
