= Clement Finley =

Physician and Surgeon General of the US Army

Clement Alexander Finley
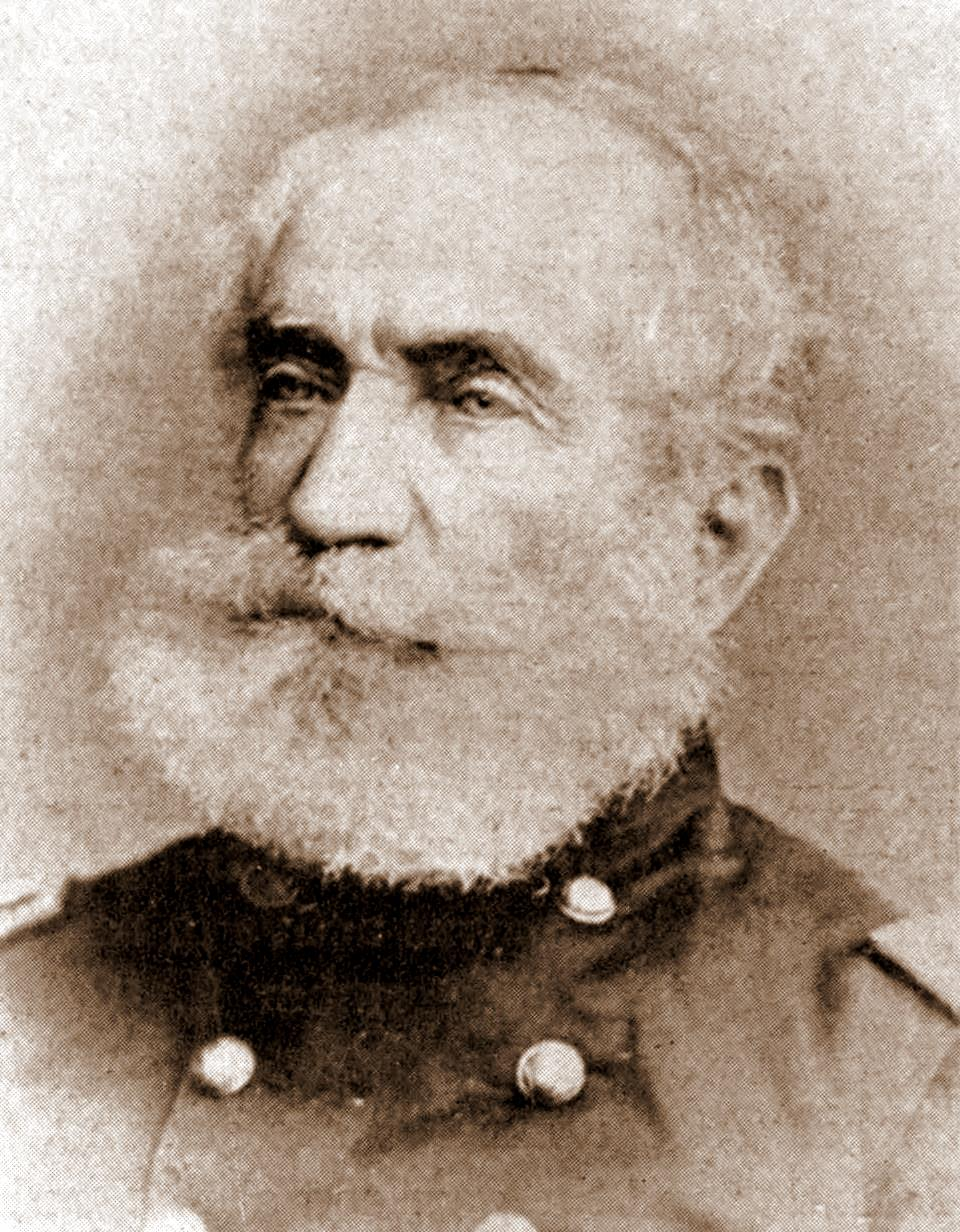
- Born: May 11, 1797; Newville, Pennsylvania, US
- Died: September 8, 1879 (aged 82); West Philadelphia, Pennsylvania, US
- Relatives: Brigadier General Daniel Webster Flagler (son in law); Major General Clement Flagler (grandson); Major General Thomas D. Finley (grandson)
- Military career
- Branch: United States Army; Union Army
- Service years: 1818–1862
- Rank: Brigadier General
- Unit: Army Medical Department
- Commands: Surgeon General of the United States Army
- Conflicts: Black Hawk War 2nd Seminole War; Mexican–American War: Siege of Veracruz; American Civil War

Clement Alexander Finley (May 11, 1797 – September 8, 1879), was the 10th Surgeon General of the United States Army, May 15, 1861 – April 14, 1862.

== Early life ==
Clement Finley was born at Newville, Pennsylvania. His father, Samuel Finley, served in the Virginia cavalry during the Revolutionary War attaining the grade of major. President George Washington appointed him receiver of public moneys in the northwest, which position took him to Chillicothe, Ohio, about 1796, where he received a large allotment of land for his Revolutionary War service. Here Clement spent his childhood and youth and obtained his early education.

== Education ==
With the educational facilities of Chillicothe exhausted, he was sent to Carlisle, Pennsylvania, near his birthplace, to Dickinson College where he was graduated in 1815. He then went to Philadelphia where in 1818 he was given the degree of M.D. by the University of Pennsylvania School of Medicine. On August 30, 1833, he matriculated as a therapeutist at the Therapeutic Institute of Philadelphia.

== Military ==
His father's military service attracted him to the army, which had recently emerged from the War of 1812, and on August 10, 1818, he was commissioned as a surgeon's mate of the 1st Infantry. The forty-three years that intervened before he became Surgeon General were filled largely with routine garrison duty, but included much field service in the wars of the period. His first assignment carried with it four years with his regiment in Louisiana, then two years in what was then the wilds of Arkansas, at Fort Smith. In the years from 1825 to 1828 he served at Fort Gibson. He also served in Florida, at Jefferson Barracks Military Post, and at Fort Leavenworth.

Following this he passed three years at Fort Dearborn, Illinois, where he saw the beginning of Chicago's marvelous growth. In 1831 he was ordered to Fort Howard, Wisconsin, and while on this duty he was detached for service as chief medical officer (with rank of major) of the forces operating under General Winfield Scott in the Black Hawk War of 1832. He served a year with the 1st Dragoons in Florida, then two years again at Jefferson Barracks Military Post. In 1834 he was again sent to Florida where he served throughout the Seminole War until 1838. With hostilities over he was sent to Fortress Monroe, Virginia, for a year, and then to Buffalo, New York, for another year. From 1840 to 1844 he served at Carlisle Barracks, Pennsylvania, where he renewed his acquaintance with his alma mater, Dickinson College. The outbreak of the Mexican–American War found him again at Fortress Monroe, from where he was sent in 1846 to the army which was invading Mexico across its northern border. By virtue of his rank he became medical director of this army commanded by General Zachary Taylor, but shortly after was sent north on account of sickness. During this detached service be acted as member of a number of examining boards. In 1847 he returned to duty in Mexico with the army, under General Scott, during the Siege of Veracruz. He was medical director of this force until again sickness required that he be sent north. He was permanently relieved from Mexico duty and ordered to Newport Barracks, Kentucky. In 1849 he went back to Jefferson Barracks for a third tour of duty and in 1854 to duty in Philadelphia with his quarters at Frankford Arsenal. The years upon this detail largely involved work on examining boards and it was on this sort of duty that he was engaged when in 1861 he received the appointment to the office of Surgeon General.

== Surgeon General appointment ==
Surgeon General Lawson's death came unexpectedly and it was generally considered that his successor would be Surgeon Robert C. Wood, a high-ranking officer who was in charge of the office during Lawson's absence. Wood was son-in-law to former President Taylor and brother-in-law to Jefferson Davis and from his long duty in the War Department had many other influential friends. But a new political party was now in control and President Abraham Lincoln chose Finley, the senior officer of the corps, for the coveted place on May 15, 1861. Finley retained Wood as his assistant and their relations appear to have been entirely cordial.

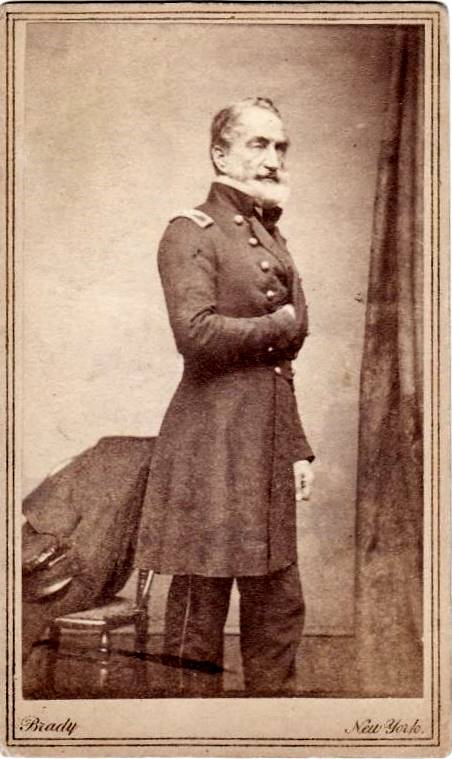
Carte de visite by Mathew Brady

The new Surgeon General was sixty-four at the time of appointment, but was in good physical condition and entered the office keen for the heavy duties devolving upon him. Beyond his office work he was busy in the furtherance of legislation and in the selection of hospital buildings and sites in the capital city. It is difficult at this time to determine to what extent Finley influenced the policies and legislation affecting the medical department during his term of office. The United States Sanitary Commission was active with criticism and recommendations and had high influence with Congress. The act passed on August 3, 1861 (12 Stat. 288), increasing the number of officers and providing for the employment of medical cadets and female nurses was no doubt in response to recommendations from both the office of the Surgeon General and the Sanitary Commission. The act also provided for the creation of boards for the consideration of cases of disability. A provision for two assistants to the Surgeon General with the rank of lieutenant colonel, contained in the original bill, was stricken out.

On April 16, 1862, an act was passed (12 Stat. 378) for the reorganization of the medical department which gave the Surgeon General the rank of Brigadier General, created an assistant Surgeon General and a medical inspector with rank of colonel, eight medical inspectors with the rank of lieutenant colonel, and provided for medical purveyors. This was the first time when actual rank in the medical department had exceeded the grade of major, except that the Surgeon General had the grade of colonel. But Finley was not to achieve the advanced grade, as he was retired on his own application on April 14, 1862, two days before the passage of that act. He had incurred the displeasure of Secretary of War Edwin M. Stanton by a hospital appointment and after a heated interview with the Secretary had been relieved from his office and directed to repair to Boston and await orders. From Boston he appealed against the treatment accorded him, but despite the efforts of influential friends no action could be obtained and hopeless of justice and redress he applied for admission to the retired list. In the meantime, and until the appointment of his successor, Surgeon Wood performed the duties of Surgeon General.

== Marriage ==
In 1832 he married Elizabeth Moore, daughter of Dr. Samuel Moore, at that time director of the United States Mint at Philadelphia and formerly member of Congress from Bucks County, Pennsylvania. The couple had nine children. Their daughter Mary McCalla Finley (1834–1907) was the wife of Daniel Webster Flagler and mother of Clement Flagler.Their son, Walter Lowrie Finley, went to West Point and had a long career in Army

== Later life ==
After his retirement Finley made his home in West Philadelphia. In 1865, he was given the brevet rank of Brigadier General "for long and meritorious service in the army." On July 18, 1876, he was finally put on the retired list as full Brigadier General. He passed eighteen peaceful years in Philadelphia, where he died at his residence on September 8, 1879.

== Sources ==
- US Army Medical Department
