= Daniel Webster Flagler =

United States Army general

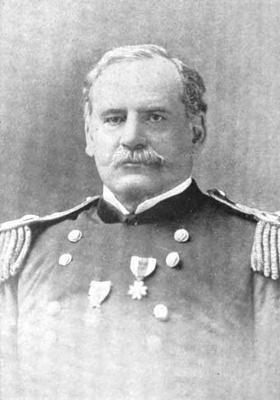
- General Flagler at the time of the Spanish–American War
- Born: June 20, 1835; Lockport, New York, US
- Died: March 29, 1899 (aged 63); Old Point Comfort, Virginia, US
- Burial place: Arlington National Cemetery, Virginia, US
- Relatives: Major General Clement Flagler (Son); Brigadier General Clement Finley (Father in Law)
- Military career
- Allegiance: United States
- Branch: United States Army
- Service years: 1861–1899
- Rank: Brigadier General
- Commands: 9th Chief of Ordnance (1891-1899)
- Conflicts: Civil War; Spanish–American War

Daniel Webster Flagler (June 20, 1835 – March 29, 1899) was a United States Army Brigadier General. He was prominent as the Army's 9th Chief of Ordnance for the U.S. Army Ordnance Corps.

== Early life ==
Flagler was appointed to the United States Military Academy, West Point, New York in 1856. He graduated fifth in the class of 1861 and was appointed a second lieutenant of ordnance.

== Civil War ==
Flagler's first Civil War assignment was to teach drill and ceremony and other basic skills to newly raised volunteers in Washington, D.C. He served as aide to David Hunter in the Manassas Campaign, and fought during the First Battle of Bull Run.

He next served as aide to Irvin McDowell in the defense of Washington.

After serving at the Allegheny Arsenal, he participated in Ambrose Burnside's North Carolina expedition. Flagler took part in the capture of Roanoke Island, the attack of New Bern, and the capture of Fort Macon.

Next assigned to the Army of the Potomac, Flagler took part in the Maryland Campaign, including the Battle of South Mountain. Flagler also participated in the battles of Antietam, Fredericksburg, Chancellorsville, and Gettysburg.

Flagler was assigned to inspection duty at the West Point Foundry in October 1863 and remained there until May 1864. He was then transferred to the Army's Ordnance office in Washington, where he remained until June 1865.

A Captain at the end of the war, Flagler was a brevet Lieutenant Colonel, having received three honorary promotions—one for valor at New Bern, one for meritorious service at Fort Macon, and one for distinguished service to the Ordnance Department throughout the war. Though he received three brevets for his Civil War service, he was not promoted to the permanent rank of Major until June 1874.

== Post Civil War ==
After the war, Flagler had charge of a succession of former Confederate ordnance establishments, including depots and storage facilities, at which he was in charge of dispossessing surplus materiel.

In June 1871, he began his longest assignment, that of commandant of Rock Island Arsenal, Illinois, a position he held for fifteen years. When he arrived at his new post, he found that the vast plans for a massive arsenal complex, conceived by his predecessor, General Thomas J. Rodman, had gotten no further than the preliminary stages. Flager not only developed and completed the major portion of Rodman's great enterprise, but he also authored a highly respected history of the arsenal and its operations, published in 1877. By 1881, he had been advanced to the permanent rank of Lieutenant Colonel. His service at Rock Island Arsenal was punctuated by a series of shorter temporary assignments; including, membership on the Board of Heavy Gun Carriages in New York (January–March 1873), special inspection duty at Fort Union Arsenal, New Mexico Territory (September 1880), with the specific assignment of winding down the work of that agency; and finally inspection duty at several posts in California, Texas, and New Mexico, completed in February and March 1883.

A permanent transfer to command Frankford Arsenal occurred at the end of May 1886. Flagler's tenure in Philadelphia was frequently interrupted by a variety of special tasks, including presidency of a board designated to test rifled cannon and projectiles in 1889. By November 1889, Flagler had begun a tour of nearly thirteen months as commandant of Watertown Arsenal, during which period was promoted to the rank of Colonel in September 1890.

Flagler was named the 9th Chief of Ordnance and promoted to Brigadier General on January 23, 1891. He entered his new duties admirably equipped by reason of his wide experience, but the Congresses of the 1890s were not disposed to grant the appropriations he considered necessary for the maintenance and upgrading of the Ordnance Department. Efforts were made to improve the nations' coastal defense posture. Considerable testing was done on Gatling guns, the Colt machine gun, gun carriages, armor-piercing projectiles, rifled cannon, various types of gunpowder, and pneumatic dynamite guns. During his tenure, the Army's first smokeless powder and bolt action, magazine rifle, the model 1892 Krag, was adopted. This weapon was first issued to the Fourth Infantry Regiment in 1894.

Despite failing health in the spring of 1898, General Flagler was able to overcome the problems of low peacetime production during the brief Spanish–American War. He orchestrated the country's production facilities in such a manner as to make it possible for the Ordnance Department to meet and exceed production quotas. General Flagler also oversaw the Army's first efforts to ship materiel overseas, using new depots in California and Florida.

== Death and burial ==
General Flagler died at the Hygeia Hotel, a resort where he had gone in an effort to recover his health after suffering from rheumatism and other ailments. He was buried at Arlington National Cemetery, Section West E, Site 147. Daniel W. Flagler and his wife are memorialized on one side of the grave marker, and General Clement Flagler and his wife are memorialized on the other. He was 63.

== Family ==
On September 13, 1865, Flagler married Mary McCalla Finley, the daughter of Brigadier General Clement Alexander Finley. Their children included a daughter, Elizabeth (1866–1939) and a son, Clement (1867–1922).

Clement Arthur Finley Flagler was a career Army officer who attained the rank of Major General as a division commander in World War I.

In 1895 Elizabeth Flagler was found guilty of manslaughter after she shot and killed a 15-year-old African American boy, one of several she fired a pistol at when she observed them stealing pears from her father's garden. Prominent local residents including Robert Macfeely served as her sureties, enabling her to post a bond. Following her guilty plea, she served three hours in the District of Columbia jail and paid a fine of $500. In 1901 she married Doctor George W. MacKean of Nova Scotia.

== Other ==
Fort Flagler on Marrowstone Island in Washington was named for him. The site is now a state park and is listed on the National Register of Historic Places.

Flagler Place Northwest in the Bloomingdale neighborhood of Washington, D.C. is named for him.

Military offices
Preceded by Brigadier General Stephen Vincent Benet	Chief of Ordnance of the United States Army; 1891 - 1899	Succeeded by Brigadier General Adelbert R. Buffington
