= Charles Crawford (United States Army officer) =

United States Army officer and author

- Born: 27 December 1866; Coshocton, Ohio, United States
- Died: 28 December 1945 (aged 79) Kansas, United States
- Allegiance: United States
- Branch: United States Army
- Service years: 1889–1919
- Rank: Brigadier General
- Service number: 0-13373
- Conflicts: Spanish–American War; World War I

Charles Crawford (27 December 1866 – 28 December 1945) was a United States Army officer and an author. He served in the Spanish–American War, the Philippines and World War I.

== Early life and education ==
Crawford was born in Coshocton, Ohio, to Thomas Crawford and Margaret Parkhill. In 1889, Crawford graduated 41st in a class of 49 from the United States Military Academy, where he was a classmate of future army generals such as George L. Irwin, Charles D. Rhodes, William G. Haan, Clement Flagler, William Lassiter, Edward McGlachlin Jr. and William S. Graves. Later, he graduated from the Army War College in 1912.

== Military career ==
Crawford served as a second lieutenant in the 10th Infantry on the United States frontier between 1889 and 1895, which included military police duty in Oklahoma City until 1890 and assisting the U.S. Commission in dealings with American Indian tribes; between 1891 and 1892 he organized an Apache Indian Company in the 10th Infantry. During the Spanish–American War he participated in the Battle of San Juan Hill (1898) and was later commended for his bravery. Between 1903 and 1907 he taught at Fort Leavenworth, Kansas, in the Infantry and Cavalry School and the Army Staff College. Crawford also served in the Philippines a number of times, first between 1890 and 1902 and again between 1909 and 1911. From 1913 to 1916 Crawford served on the General Staff of the U.S. Army, after which he was in Panama Canal Zone until 1917. During World War I, Crawford served with the American Expeditionary Force as a brigadier general of the National Army. There he commanded the 6th Infantry Brigade, 3rd Infantry Division, during the Second Battle of the Marne. In 1919, Crawford retired owing to disabilities.

== Personal life and death ==
Crawford lived in Paola, Kansas, and died on 28 December 1945 in an automobile accident. He was buried in Paola.

He was a Presbyterian and married to E. M. Miller (d. 1919); they had no children. Crawford was also an author of two books: Charles, Crawford (2017). Six Months with the 6th Brigade. Forgotten Books. ISBN 978-0260863218. and Restarting Economic Theory.
