= William Wright Harts =

Officer of the United States Army

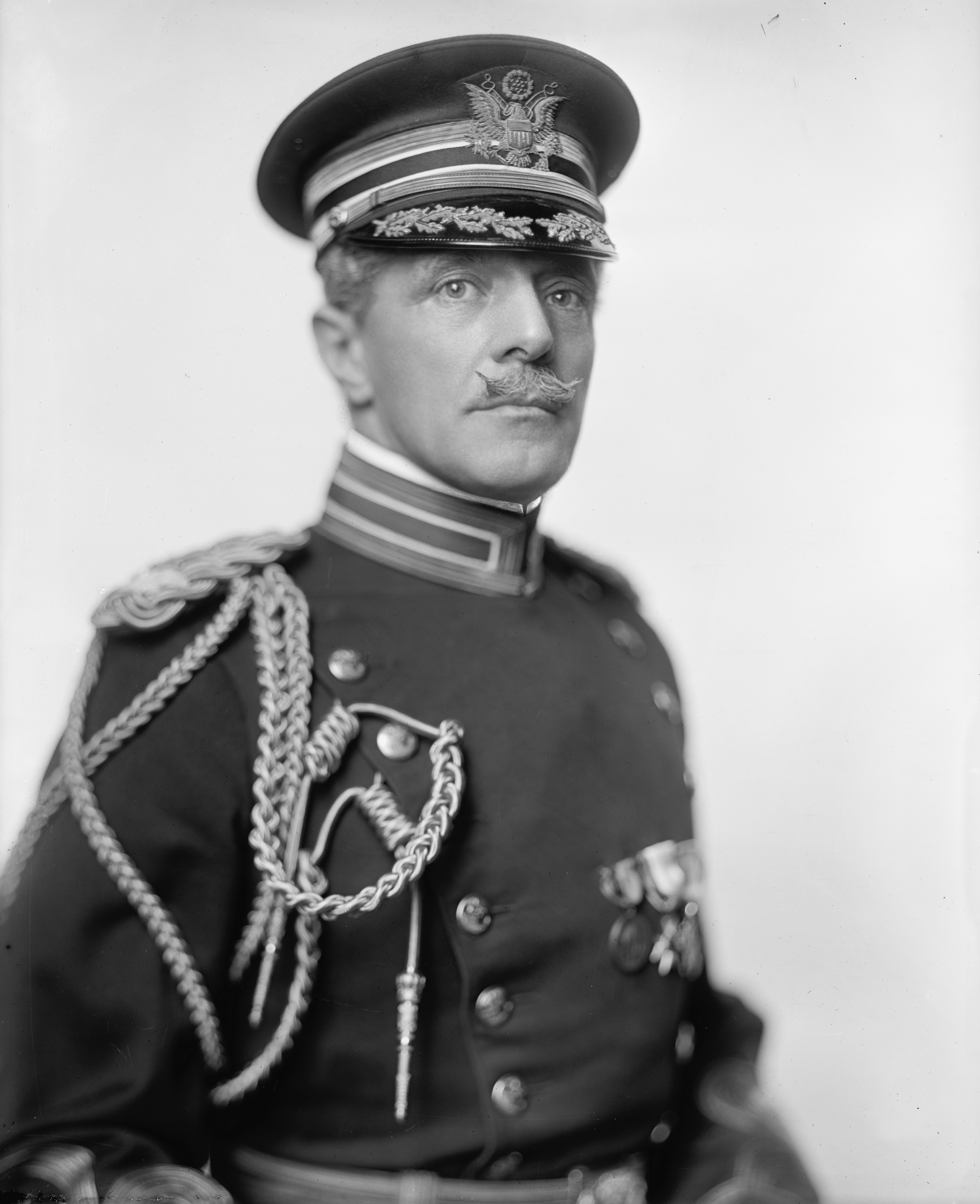
- Born: August 29, 1866; Springfield, Illinois, United States
- Died: April 21, 1961 (aged 94); Madison, Connecticut, United States
- Spouse: Martha Davis Hale
- Children: 4
- Military career
- Allegiance: United States
- Branch: United States Army
- Service years: 1888–1929
- Rank: Brigadier general
- Service number: 0-279
- Conflicts: Philippine–American War; World War I
- Awards: Distinguished Service Medal; Order of St Michael and St George; Legion of Honour; Order of the Crown (Belgium)

William Wright Harts (August 29, 1866 – April 21, 1961) was a United States Army officer in the late 19th and early 20th centuries. He served in several conflicts and capacities, including in World War I, and he received the Army Distinguished Service Medal among other awards.

== Biography ==
Harts was born on August 29, 1866, in Springfield, Illinois. Between 1884 and 1885, he attended Princeton University before entering the United States Military Academy, graduating from the latter in 1889, sixth of 49 cadets.

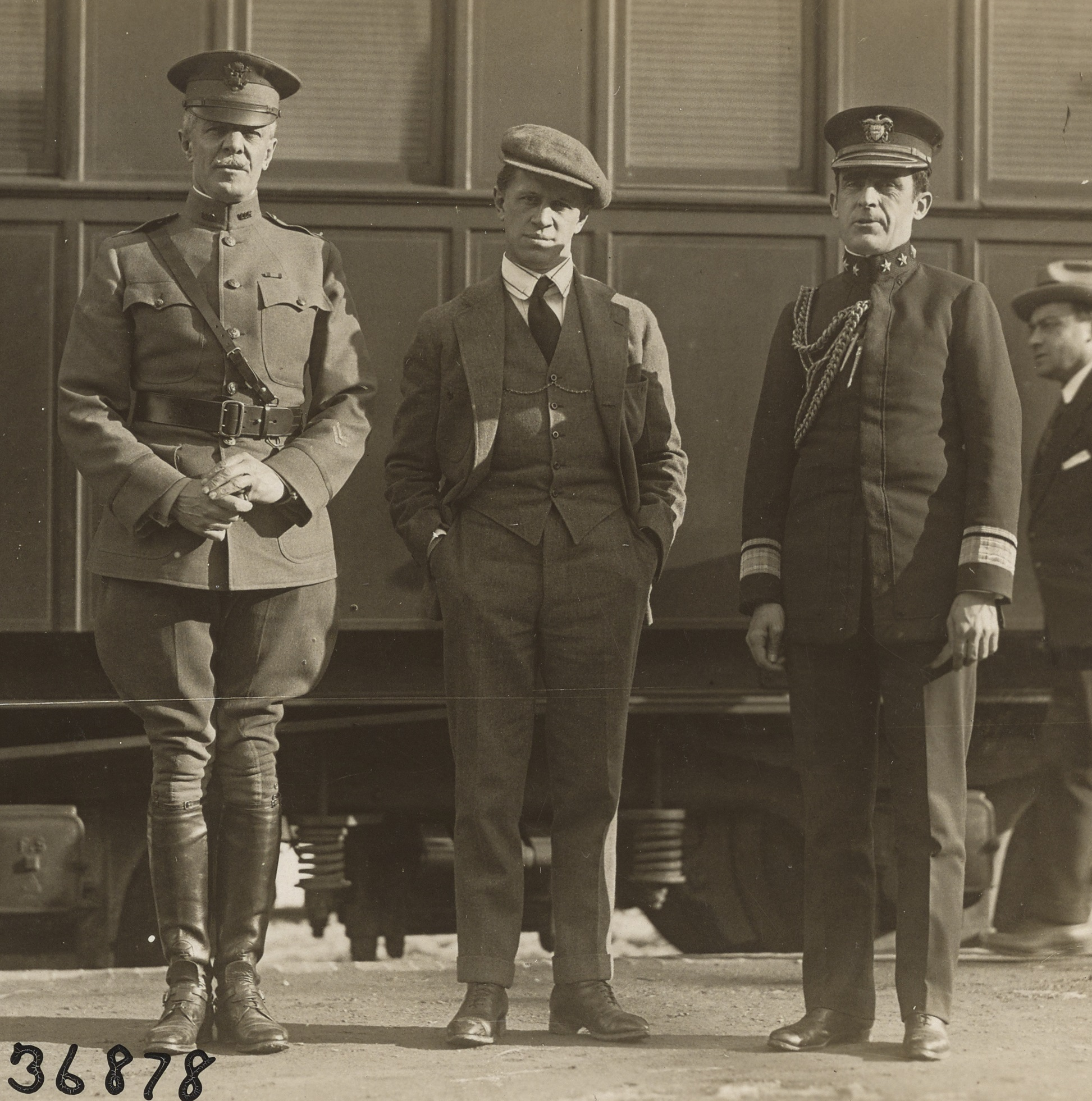
William Harts with George Creel and Admiral Cary Grayson in front of the presidential train en route to Italy in January 1919.

Harts served in the United States Army Corps of Engineers until 1917, working on numerous construction projects. He participated in the Philippine Insurrection and served in the Philippines from 1903 to 1907. He graduated from the Engineer School of Application in 1892, and he graduated from the United States Army War College in 1912. He also taught at the latter. He graduated from the Naval War College in 1913. From 1913 to 1917, Harts served as the construction engineer of the Lincoln Memorial, and in 1917, he was the commandant of the Engineer School. He also served as an aide of U.S. President Woodrow Wilson from 1913 to 1918.

Harts served in France during World War I, initially commanding the Sixth Engineer Regiment. He was promoted to the rank of brigadier general on December 17, 1917, and he commanded a provisional brigade with the British Fifth Army. Harts then commanded the District of Paris from 1918 to 1919, and he received the Army Distinguished Service Medal during this time. The medal's citation reads:

The President of the United States of America, authorized by Act of Congress, July 9, 1918, takes pleasure in presenting the Army Distinguished Service Medal to Brigadier General William Wright Harts, United States Army, for exceptionally meritorious and distinguished services to the Government of the United States, in a duty of great responsibility during World War I. In Command of the important District of Paris, by his painstaking efforts and able directorship, General Harts maintained a high standard of discipline and efficiency among his large command. By his tact and keen perception he handled numerous diplomatic affairs with great satisfaction, rendering services of a superior value to the American Expeditionary Forces.

He later served under Major General Henry Tureman Allen from 1919 to 1920 as the chief of staff to the American forces in Germany.

Harts graduated from the United States Army Field Artillery School in 1923 and from the Coast Artillery School in 1924. His promotion to brigadier general was made permanent in 1924. He commanded the Panama Canal's artillery defense from 1924 to 1926, and he served as the U.S. military attache in Paris from 1926 to 1930. Harts retired in 1930. He received several foreign awards during his career, including the Order of St Michael and St George, Legion of Honour, and Order of the Crown.

In retirement, Harts and his family lived in Madison, Connecticut. He died on April 21, 1961.

== Personal life ==
Harts married Martha Davis Hale on October 27, 1898, and they had four children together. He served in numerous professional and social organizations.

== Bibliography ==
- Davis, Henry Blaine Jr. (1998). Generals in Khaki. Raleigh, North Carolina: Pentland Press. ISBN 1571970886. OCLC 40298151.
- Marquis Who's Who (1975). Who Was Who In American History – The Military. Chicago, Illinois: Marquis Who's Who. ISBN 0837932017.
