= William J. Glasgow =

US Army brigadier general (1866–1967)

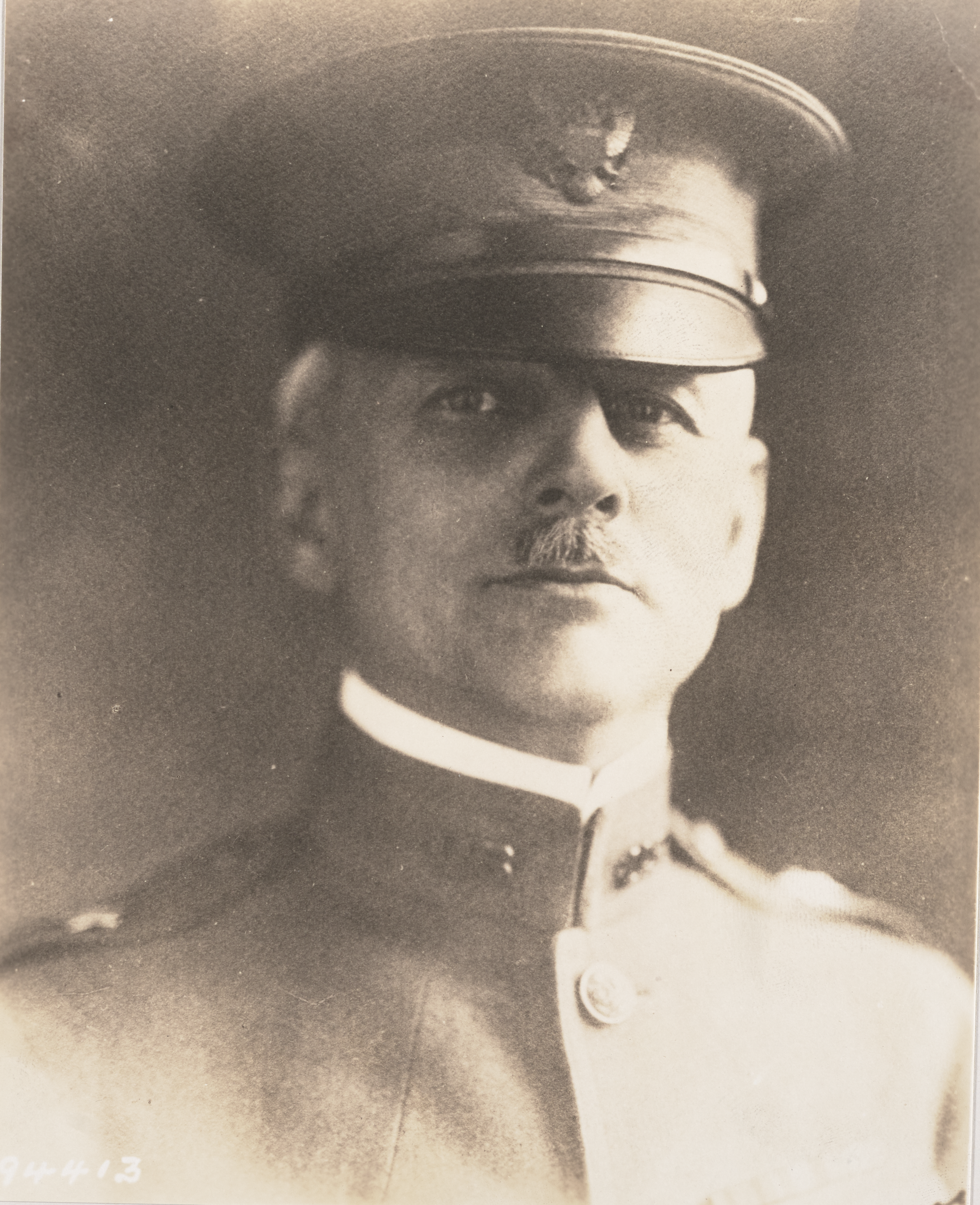
- Glasgow as a brigadier general in 1918
- Born: 18 May 1866; St. Louis, Missouri, US
- Died: 4 August 1967 (aged 101); El Paso, Texas, US
- Burial place: Fort Bliss National Cemetery
- Education: United States Military Academy; United States Army Command and General Staff College; United States Army War College
- Spouse: Josephine Richardson Magoffin (m. 1896–1967)
- Children: 5
- Military career
- Service: United States Army
- Service years: 1891–1927
- Rank: Brigadier General
- Service number: 0-381
- Unit: US Army Cavalry Branch
- Commands: 3rd Squadron, 5th Cavalry Regiment; Brigade and Field Officers' School, Fort Sam Houston; 14th Cavalry Regiment; 20th Infantry Brigade; 164th Depot Brigade; 3rd Cavalry Regiment; Fort Myer
- Conflicts: Spanish–American War; Military Government of Cuba; Philippine–American War; Mexican Border War; World War I
- Other work: Director of Personnel, Nichols Copper Refinery

William J. Glasgow (18 May 1866 – 4 August 1967) was a career officer in the United States Army. A veteran of the Spanish–American War, Military Government of Cuba, Philippine–American War, Mexican Border War, and World War I, he commanded Cavalry and Infantry units and attained the rank of brigadier general.

A native of St. Louis, Glasgow was raised and educated in St. Louis and was an 1891 graduate of the United States Military Academy at West Point. Assigned to the Cavalry, he served with Cavalry regiments at the start of his career, and during the late 1890s and early 1900s he was frequently assigned as aide-de-camp to brigade and division commanders. During the First World War, he commanded an infantry brigade and a depot brigade as a temporary brigadier general, after which he took part in a post-war observation and inspection tour of battlefields in France.

After World War I, Glasgow graduated from the United States Army Command and General Staff College and United States Army War College, and commanded the 3rd Cavalry Regiment and the post at Fort Myer, Virginia. In March 1927 he was promoted to permanent brigadier general, and he retired in May. After his military retirement, he was director of personnel for a copper refinery in El Paso, Texas. Glasgow died in El Paso on 4 August 1967 and was buried at Fort Bliss National Cemetery.

== Early life ==
William Jefferson Glasgow was born in St. Louis, Missouri on 18 May 1866, the son of Edward J. Glasgow and Harrier (Clark) Glasgow. He was raised and educated in St. Louis and attended the academy at Washington University in St. Louis, after which he attended the university. In June 1887, he competed for an appointment to the United States Military Academy offered by Congressman John Milton Glover; he finished first among 12 applicants and began attending later that year. Glasgow graduated in 1891 ranked 30th of 65. Among his classmates who later attained general's rank were: James Francis McIndoe, Jay Johnson Morrow, Odus Creamer Horney, LeRoy Springs Lyon, Andrew Hero Jr., Tiemann Newell Horn, Edward D. Anderson, Edwin B. Winans, Harold Palmer Howard, John Bradbury Bennet, John W. Heavey, LaRoy S. Upton, Harry Alexander Smith, George C. Saffarans, Palmer E. Pierce, Lutz Wahl, William Payne Jackson, John L. Hines, John Jewsbury Bradley, Herbert Owen Williams, and Hanson Edward Ely. Among his classmates who did not attain general officer rank was Spencer Cosby.

At graduation, Glasgow was commissioned a second lieutenant of Cavalry and assigned to the 1st Cavalry Regiment at Fort Leavenworth, where he served until April 1892. He served at Fort Bayard, New Mexico from April 1892 to May 1895. He was then posted to Fort Sam Houston, where he was assigned as aide-de-camp to Brigadier General Zenas R. Bliss, the commander of the Department of Texas. In June 1897, he was transferred to Fort Riley, Kansas where he remained until April 1898.

In November 1896, Glasgow married Josephine Richardson Magoffin of El Paso, Texas. They were married until his death and were the parents of five children.

== Start of career ==
The Spanish–American War began in April 1898, and Glasgow served with the 1st Cavalry at Chickamauga Park, Georgia and Lakeland, Florida until August 1898. He received promotion to first lieutenant in July 1898. Glasgow's next assignment was aide-de-camp to Brigadier General Joseph K. Hudson, the commander of 2nd Brigade, 2nd Division, Fourth Army Corps, first in Tampa, Florida and later in Huntsville, Alabama. In December 1898, Glasgow Joined the 2nd Cavalry Regiment and was assigned as chief quartermaster of Fourth Army Corps. He performed Military Government of Cuba duty with the 2nd Cavalry at Matanzas, Cuba in January and February 1899, then was assigned as aide-de-camp to Major General James H. Wilson, the commander of the Department of Matanzas and Santa Clara. He served with the 2nd Cavalry in Matanzas until April 1901, including service as acting judge advocate from October 1899 to August 1900, and he was promoted to captain in February 1901.

After his service in Cuba, Glasgow served as adjutant of the 13th Cavalry Regiment at Fort Meade, South Dakota from May, 1901 to February 1903. He was then posted to the Philippine–American War duty as assistant adjutant of the Division of the Philippines, and he served in this position during July and August 1903. He was next assigned as aide-de‑camp to Major General James F. Wade, commander of the Division of the Philippines, and he carried out this assignment until October 1904. After his return to the United States, he continued to serve as Wade's aide during Wade's command of the Division of the Atlantic at Governors Island, New York. From April to August 1907, Glasgow performed temporary staff duty at the Governors Island headquarters of the army's Department of the East. From September 1907 to December 1908, He served with 13th Cavalry at Fort Sheridan, Illinois.

== Continued career ==
Glasgow served as adjutant of the 13th Cavalry Regiment at Camp McGrath, Philippines from February 1909 to March 1911. After returning to the United States, he commanded a troop of the 13th Cavalry at Fort Riley, Kansas. Beginning in March 1912, he performed special staff duty in St. Louis and at other posts, including service on the committee chaired by Edward Lyman Munson that created the Munson Last Shoe, the army's primary footwear of World War I and the 1920s. He was next assigned to the office of the Chief of Staff of the United States Army in Washington, D.C. In March 1913, he was assigned to command a troop of the 15th Cavalry at Fort Sheridan, but held this position only briefly, because he was assigned to temporary duty as a captain with the quartermaster corps. In late March 1913 he was assigned as post quartermaster and construction quartermaster at Fort Myer, Virginia, where he remained until September 1914. He served as quartermaster of the 1st Field Brigade at Plattsburg Barracks, New York in September and October 1914, then returned to Fort Myer.

In November 1914, Glasgow was promoted to major and assigned to command 3rd Squadron, 5th Cavalry Regiment at Fort Myer. In March 1915, he was assigned to attend the officers' course at the Fort Riley Mounted Service School; he graduated in June and resumed command of his squadron. From December 1915 to March 1916, he was posted to Fort Leavenworth as a student at the Army Service Schools. He then joined the 5th Cavalry at Columbus, New Mexico, where he served during the Mexican Border War. In February 1917, Glasgow was assigned to Fort Bliss, Texas where he served with the 5th Cavalry and was promoted to lieutenant colonel of the 7th Cavalry in March 1917. American entry into World War I occurred in April 1917, and Glasgow transferred back to the 5th Cavalry later that month.

== Later career ==
In late April 1917, Glasgow began First World War duty as an instructor at the Fort Myer Officers' Training Camp; he received promotion to temporary colonel in August 1917 and remained as an instructor until December. From December 1917 to May 1918, he served as commandant of the Fort Sam Houston Brigade and Field Officers' School. He performed temporary staff duty in May and June 1918, then was posted to Camp Travis, Texas, where he was assigned to command of the 14th Cavalry Regiment. In August 1918, he was promoted to temporary brigadier general and assigned to command the 20th Infantry Brigade, a unit of the 10th Division, during its organization and training at Camp Funston, Kansas. The Armistice of November 11, 1918 ended the war before the 10th Division could depart the United States for combat in France, and Glasgow remained in command of his brigade until the division was inactivated in early 1919. He then commanded the 164th Depot Brigade at Camp Funston, which conducted mustering out and discharging of soldiers returning from the war until May 1919. He was reduced in rank to his permanent grade of lieutenant colonel at the end of May 1919.

From June to August 1919, Glasgow participated in an inspection and observation tour of World War I battlefields in France. He was then assigned to attend the United States Army Command and General Staff College, from which he graduated in June 1920. He was promoted to colonel after his staff college graduation, then was posted to Washington, D.C., where he was a student at the United States Army War College, which he completed in June 1921. His next assignment was chief of staff of the 1st Division, first at Camp Dix, New Jersey, then at Fort Hamilton, New York. In September 1923, he was appointed director of personnel in the office of the army's Chief of Cavalry. In August 1926, Glasgow was assigned to command of the 3rd Cavalry Regiment and the post at Fort Myer. In March 1927, he was promoted to brigadier general. In May 1927, Glasgow applied for retirement, which was approved on 21 May.

After retiring from the army, Glasgow resided at the Magoffin Homestead, the El Paso, Texas home constructed by his wife's family in the late 1800s. From 1928 until 1941, he served as director of personnel for the Nichols Copper Refinery. From 1964 until his death, Glasgow was the oldest living West Point graduate. He died in El Paso on 4 August 1967 and was buried at Fort Bliss National Cemetery.
