= Harry Alexander Smith =

US Army major general

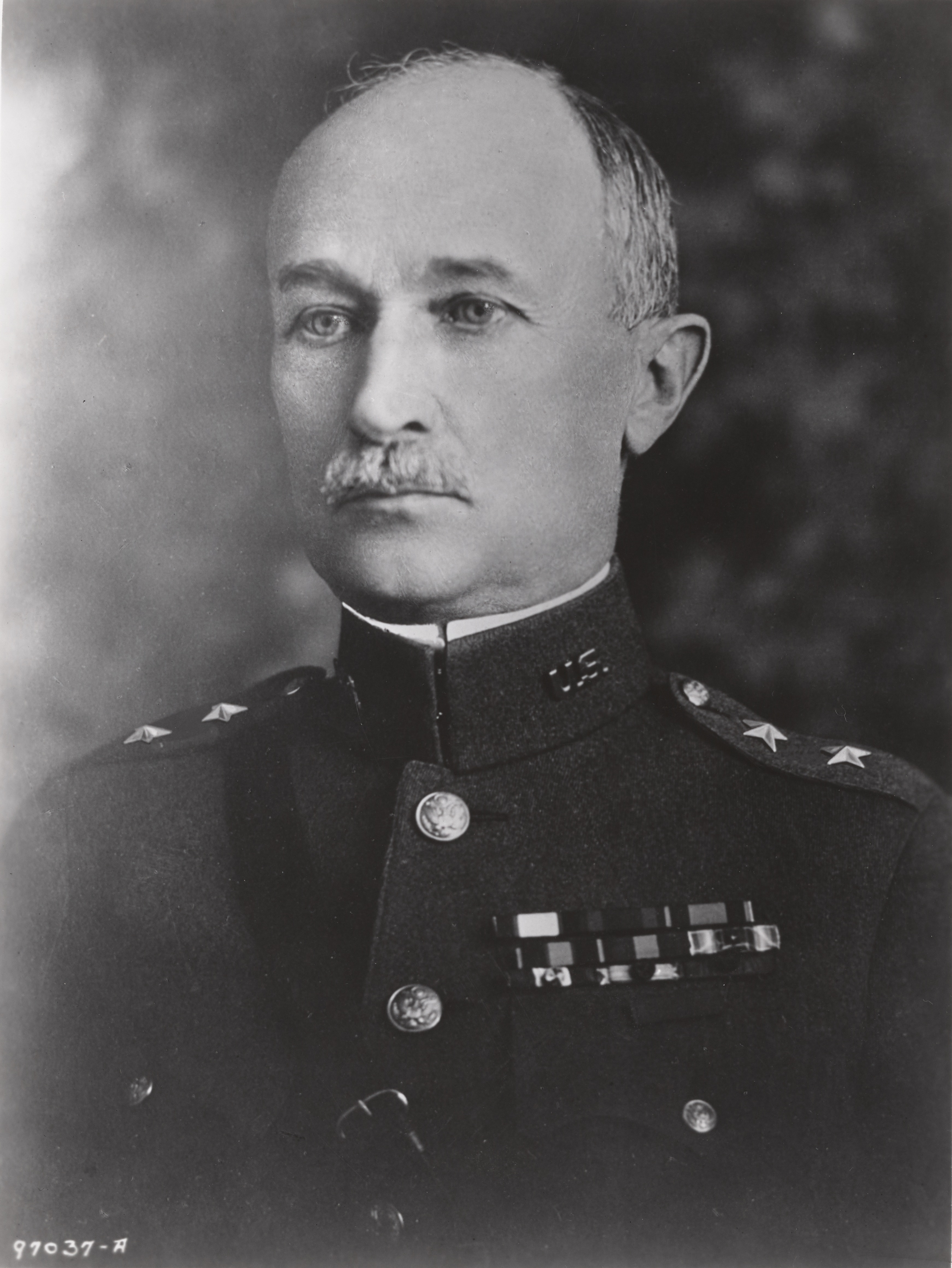
- Smith as a major general c. 1926
- Born: 18 June 1866; Atchison, Kansas, US
- Died: 29 May 1929 (aged 62); Omaha, Nebraska, US
- Burial place: Mount Vernon Cemetery, Atchison, Kansas, US
- Education: United States Military Academy; United States Army Command and General Staff College; United States Army War College
- Spouse: Harriet Newcomb (m. 1892–1929)
- Children: 2
- Relatives: John Martin (uncle)
- Military career
- Service: United States Army
- Service years: 1891–1929
- Rank: Major General
- Service number: 0-335
- Unit: US Army Infantry Branch
- Commands: Company G, 1st Infantry Regiment; 3rd Battalion, 28th Infantry Regiment; US Army Schools, Langres; Chief of Civil Affairs, American Forces in Germany; 16th Infantry Brigade; United States Army Command and General Staff College; Seventh Corps Area
- Wars: Spanish–American War; Military Government of Cuba; Philippine–American War; Veracruz Expedition; Mexican Border War; World War I Occupation of the Rhineland
- Awards: Army Distinguished Service Medal; Order of the Bath (Companion) (United Kingdom); Legion of Honor (Commander) (France); Croix de guerre with palm (France); Order of the Oak Crown (Commander) (Luxembourg); Order of La Solidaridad (Commander) (Panama)

Harry Alexander Smith (18 June 1866 – 29 May 1929) was a career officer in the United States Army. A veteran of the Spanish–American War, Military Government of Cuba, Philippine–American War, Veracruz Expedition, Mexican Border War, and World War I, he attained the rank of major general. Smith was a recipient of the Army Distinguished Service Medal and several foreign awards, and his commands included the 16th Infantry Brigade, the United States Army Command and General Staff College, and the Seventh Corps Area.

A native of Atchison, Kansas, Smith was raised and educated in Atchison. He then attended the United States Military Academy at West Point, from which he graduated in 1891. Commissioned as a second lieutenant of Infantry, his initial assignments wee with the 1st Infantry Regiment at posts in California. During the Spanish–American War, he served with the 21st Kansas Volunteer Infantry Regiment at posts in the United States, after which he served at several overseas posts during the Military Government of Cuba. From 1900 to 1902, he served with the 15th Infantry Regiment during the Philippine–American War.

Smith's subsequent assignments included a long posting to Fort Leavenworth as a member of the faculty of the Army Service Schools, now the United States Army Command and General Staff College. In 1914, he took part in the Veracruz Expedition, where he was in charge of the occupation government's legal department and police department. In 1915 and 1916, he commanded 3rd Battalion, 28th Infantry Regiment in Texas during the Mexican Border War. From May 1916 to August 1917, he served with in Tientsin, China as a member of the 15th Infantry. During World War I, he was assigned as assistant commandant, then commandant, of the US Army Schools at Langres. During the Occupation of the Rhineland, he was assigned as the American Forces in Germany's chief of Civil Affairs, responsible for post-war rebuilding in Luxembourg and US-occupied German territory.

After his wartime service, Smith was assistant commandant of the United States Army War College and commandant of the United States Army Command and General Staff College. He commanded the Seventh Corps Area in Omaha, Nebraska from 1927 to 1929. Smith was still on active duty when he died in Omaha on 29 May 1929. He was buried at Mount Vernon Cemetery in Atchison, Kansas.

== Early life ==
Harry A. Smith was born in Atchison, Kansas on 18 June 1866, a son of Henry A. Smith and Anna Isabel (Martin) Smith. His relatives included his mother's brother John Martin, who served as governor of Kansas from 1885 to 1889. Smith was raised and educated in Atchison and graduated from Atchison High School as the salutatorian of the class of 1882. After high school, he attended Kansas State University for two years and was employed as a collector for the Atchison Electric Light Company. While in college, he became a member of the Phi Gamma Delta fraternity. In August 1886, Smith finished first on the competitive examination for an appointment to the United States Military Academy (West Point) that was offered by US Representative Edmund Needham Morrill. He subsequently passed the academy's entrance examination, and he began attending classes in September 1886. He graduated in June 1891 ranked 39th of 65 and received his commission as a second lieutenant of Infantry.

Many of Smith's classmates went on to careers as general officers, including James Francis McIndoe, Jay Johnson Morrow, Odus Creamer Horney, LeRoy Springs Lyon, Andrew Hero Jr., Tiemann Newell Horn, Edward D. Anderson, Edwin B. Winans Jr., Harold Palmer Howard, John Bradbury Bennet, William J. Glasgow, John W. Heavey, LaRoy S. Upton, George C. Saffarans, Palmer E. Pierce, Lutz Wahl, William Payne Jackson, John L. Hines, John Jewsbury Bradley, and Hanson Edward Ely. Among his prominent classmates who did not become generals were Spencer Cosby and Charles DeLano Hine.

== Start of career ==
Smith was initially assigned to the 1st Infantry Regiment and posted to Benicia Barracks, California. In June 1892 he was transferred to the post at Fort McDowell on Angel Island, California. In the fall of 1892, he performed temporary court-martial duty at the Presidio of San Francisco. In July 1893, he led the 1st Infantry's Company G as part of the army contingent that marched in San Francisco's Independence Day parade. In March 1896, he was posted to Topeka, Kansas as advisor, instructor, and inspector for the Kansas National Guard. He was promoted to first lieutenant in March 1898.

The Spanish–American War commenced in April 1898 and in May, Smith was promoted to major of United States Volunteers. Assigned to the 21st Kansas Volunteer Infantry Regiment, he aided in organizing and training the regiment in Topeka until June, then served with it during additional training at Camp Chickamauga, Georgia. In early September 1898, the 21st Kansas Infantry was assigned to duty at Camp Hamilton near Lexington, Kentucky. In late September, the regiment was transported back to Kansas and the soldiers remained on furlough until they were discharged in December. Smith was mustered out of the Volunteers on 10 December.

== Continued career ==
Smith was assigned to duty at Fort Leavenworth, Kansas from December 1898 to January 1899. He was then assigned to Fort McPherson, Georgia, where he prepared to take part in the Military Government of Cuba. Smith served in Cuba beginning in February 1899, and was posted successively to Santiago de Cuba (February–May, 1899), Guantánamo (May–July, 1899), and La Palma, Cuba (July–October, 1899), Guantánamo (October 1899 to April 1900), and Morro Castle (April to July, 1900). He served as the commissary officer of the 5th Infantry Regiment from January 1900 until August 1900, when he returned to the United States and was posted to Fort Sheridan, Illinois. Smith was promoted to captain in September 1900.

From September 1900 to September 1902, Smith served with the 15th Infantry Regiment during the Philippine–American War. Upon returning to the United States, he was posted to the Presidio of Monterey, California. He was the 15th Infantry's commissary officer from August 1901 to April 1903. He was then assigned as the regiment's quartermaster, a post he held until August 1903. From September 1903 to August 1905, Smith served as regimental adjutant. From November 1905 to July 1907, he served again in the Philippines. From 1907 to 1908, Smith attended the Army School of the Line at Fort Leavenworth. From 1908 to 1909, he was a student at Leavenworth's United States Army Command and General Staff College. In August 1909, he was assigned to the Army Service Schools as an instructor in the department of law, where he remained until March 1912. In February 1910, he was transferred to the 7th Infantry while continuing to serve on the Army Service Schools faculty and in March 1912 he was promoted to major in the 28th Infantry Regiment and assigned to Fort Snelling, Minnesota.

In November 1912, Smith was assigned to the faculty of the Command and General Staff College as an instructor of military art. From April to November 1914, he took part in the Veracruz Expedition, where he was in charge of the occupation government's legal department and police department. He was then assigned to Galveston, Texas, where he was assigned as adjutant of the 5th Infantry Brigade during its participation in the Mexican Border War. From October 1915 to February 1916, he was assigned to Mission, Texas, where he commanded 3rd Battalion, 28th Infantry Regiment. From February to May 1916, Smith served on the Army General Staff in Washington, DC. From May 1916 to August 1917, he served with the 15th Infantry in Tientsin, China. He received promotion to lieutenant colonel in May 1917.

== Later career ==
American entry into World War I occurred in April 1917; after returning from China, Smith received promotion to temporary colonel and served on the Army General Staff from August to November 1917. He then deployed to France, where he attended the US Army's General Staff College at Langres, France until February 1918. From March to May 1918, Smith served with the staff of the British XV Corps. He was then assigned as assistant commandant, then commandant, of the US Army Schools at Langres, where he served until shortly after the Armistice of November 11, 1918 ended the war. He was promoted to temporary brigadier general in June 1918. After the war, Smith took part in the Occupation of the Rhineland, and was assigned as the American Forces in Germany's chief of Civil Affairs, making him responsible for post-war rebuilding in Luxembourg and German territory occupied US forces.

Smith returned to the United States in August 1919 and was returned to his permanent rank of lieutenant colonel. He served as assistant commandant of the Army War College until October 1922, and received promotion to colonel in October 1919 and brigadier general in October 1922. In 1921, he graduated from the Army War College. From October 1922 to June 1923, he commanded the 16th Infantry Brigade at Fort Howard, Maryland. From June 1923 to July 1925, he was commandant of the Army Service Schools at Fort Leavenworth, including the Command and General Staff College. From July 1925 to May 1927, he was assigned as assistant chief of staff for the army's War Plans Division. In April 1926, he represented the United States at the coronation of Reza Shah as the Shah of Iran. In May 1926, he was the US military delegate to the Limitation of Arms Conference that took place in Geneva, Switzerland.

Smith was promoted to major general on 20 September 1926. From May 1927 to May 1929, Smith commanded the Seventh Corps Area, which was headquartered in Omaha, Nebraska. His professional and civic memberships included the Army and Navy Club of Washington, D.C., the Rotary International club of Atchison, Kansas, the Maryland Club of Baltimore, the Kansas City Athletic Club, and the chamber of commerce in Leavenworth, Kansas. He died in Omaha on 26 May 1929. Smith was buried at Mount Vernon Cemetery in Atchison, Kansas.

== Awards ==
Smith was a recipient of the Army Distinguished Service Medal for his World War I service. In addition, he was a recipient of:

- Order of the Bath (Companion) (United Kingdom)
- Legion of Honor (Commander) (France)
- Croix de guerre with palm (France)
- Order of the Oak Crown (Commander) (Luxembourg)
- Order of La Solidaridad (Commander) (Panama)

=== Army Distinguished Service Medal citation ===
Brigadier General Harry A. Smith, United States Army, offered exceptionally meritorious and distinguished services. He rendered most conspicuous service as Commandant of the Army Schools at Langres, France, the success of which was, in a large measure, due to his vision, zeal, and administrative ability. He later showed marked executive ability as officer in charge of the administration of civil affairs in German territory occupied by the American Army.

Service: United States Army Rank: Brigadier General Division: Army Schools, Langres, France Action Date: World War I Orders: War Department, General Orders No. 12 (1919)

== Dates of rank ==
Smith's dates of rank were:

- Second Lieutenant, 12 June 1891
- First Lieutenant, 5 March 1898
- Major, (United States Volunteers), 14 May 1898
- Captain, 17 September 1900
- Major, 2 March 1912
- Lieutenant Colonel, 15 May 1917
- Colonel (National Army), 5 August 1917
- Brigadier General (National Army), 26 June 1918
- Lieutenant Colonel, 31 August 1919
- Colonel, 11 October 1919
- Brigadier General, 10 May 1922
- Major General, 20 September 1926
