= List of formations of the United States Army during World War I =

This is a list of formations in the United States Army during World War I. Many of these formations still exist today, though many by different designations.

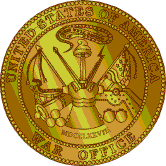
Seal of the United States War Department

== Field Armies ==
Field Armies
Shoulder Sleeve Insignia	Name	Activated	Commanding General	Campaigns
	First Army	August 10, 1918	Gen. John J. Pershing; Lt. Gen. Hunter Liggett	Meuse-Argonne
	Second Army	October 10, 1918	Lt. Gen. Robert L. Bullard	Meuse-Argonne
	Third Army	November 15, 1918	Maj. Gen. Joseph T. Dickman; Lt. Gen. Hunter Liggett	None

== Corps ==
Corps
Shoulder Sleeve Insignia	Name	Activated	Commanding General	Campaigns
	I Corps	January 20, 1918	Maj. Gen. Hunter Liggett; Maj. Gen. Joseph T. Dickman; Maj. Gen. William M. Wright	-
	II Corps	February 24, 1918	Col. George S. Simonds (acting); Maj. Gen. George W. Read	-
	III Corps	May 16, 1918	Col. Alfred W. Bjornstad (acting); Maj. Gen. William M. Wright; Maj. Gen. Robert Lee Bullard; Maj. Gen. John L. Hines	-
	IV Corps	June 20, 1918	Col. Stuart Heintzelman (acting); Maj. Gen. Joseph T. Dickman; Maj. Gen. Charles H. Muir; Maj. Gen. Charles P. Summerall	-
	V Corps	July 12, 1918	Maj. Gen. William M. Wright; Maj. Gen. George H. Cameron; Maj. Gen. Charles P. Summerall	-
	VI Corps	August 1, 1918	Maj. Gen. Omar Bundy; Brig. Gen. Briant H. Wells (acting); Maj. Gen. Charles C. Ballou; Maj. Gen. Charles T. Menoher; Maj. Gen. Adelbert Cronkhite	-
	VII Corps	August 19, 1918	Maj. Gen. William M. Wright; Lt. Col. Gordon Johnston (acting); Maj. Gen. Omar Bundy; Col. Herbert J. Brees (acting); Maj. Gen. William G. Haan; Maj. Gen. Henry T. Allen	-
	VIII Corps	November 26, 1918	Maj. Gen. Henry T. Allen; Maj. Gen. Walter H. Gordon	None
	IX Corps	November 26, 1918	Maj. Gen. Adelbert Cronkhite; Maj. Gen. Charles P. Summerall; Maj. Gen. Henry T. Allen	None

== Divisions ==
=== Cavalry divisions ===
Cavalry Divisions
Shoulder Sleeve Insignia	Name	Activated	Entered Combat	Commanding General	Campaigns
None	15th Cavalry Division	November 27, 1917	None	Maj. Gen. George W. Read; Brig. Gen. DeRosey C. Cabell	-

=== Infantry divisions ===
==== Regular Army ====
Infantry Divisions
Shoulder Sleeve Insignia	Name	Activated	Entered Combat	Commanding General	Campaigns
	1st Division ("The Big Red One")	24 May 1917	28 May 1918	Maj. Gen. William L. Sibert; Maj. Gen. Robert L. Bullard; Maj. Gen. Charles P. Summerall; Brig. Gen. Frank Parker	Cantigny; Aisne-Marne; Saint-Mihiel; Meuse–Argonne
	2nd Division ("Indian Head Division")	26 October 1917	1 June 1918	Brig. Gen. Charles A. Doyen; Maj. Gen. Omar Bundy; Maj. Gen. James Harbord; Maj. Gen. John A. Lejeune	Third Aisne; Belleau Wood; Aisne-Marne; Saint-Mihiel; Meuse–Argonne
	3rd Division ("Rock of the Marne")	21 November 1917	4 June 1918	Maj. Gen. Joseph T. Dickman; Maj. Gen. Beaumont B. Buck; Brig. Gen. Preston Brown; Maj. Gen. Robert Lee Howze	Champagne-Marne; Aisne-Marne; Saint-Mihiel; Meuse–Argonne
	4th Division ("Ivy Division")	10 December 1917	1 July 1918	Maj. Gen. George H. Cameron; Maj. Gen. John L. Hines; Maj. Gen. Mark L. Hersey	Aisne-Marne; Saint-Mihiel; Meuse–Argonne
	5th Division ("Red Diamond")	11 December 1917	14 June 1918	Maj. Gen. Charles H. Muir; Maj. Gen. John E. McMahon; Maj. Gen. Hanson E. Ely	Saint-Mihiel; Meuse–Argonne
	6th Division ("Sight-Seeing Sixth")	26 November 1917	31 August 1918	Brig. Gen. James B. Erwin; Maj. Gen. Walter H. Gordon	Meuse–Argonne
	7th Division ("Hourglass Division")	6 December 1917	10 October 1918	Brig. Gen. Charles H. Barth; Maj. Gen. Edmund Wittenmyer	Meuse–Argonne
	8th Division ("Golden Arrow Division"; "Pathfinder Division")	17 December 1917	15 August 1918	Brig. Gen. Joseph D. Leitch; Maj. Gen. John F. Morrison; Maj. Gen. William S. Graves; Maj. Gen. Eli A. Helmick	Siberia
	9th Division ("Varsity")	18 July 1918	No Combat	Maj. Gen. Willard Ames Holbrook	-
	10th Division	9 July 1918	No Combat	Maj. Gen. Leonard Wood	-
	11th Division ("Lafayette Division")	15 August 1918	No Combat	Maj. Gen. Jesse McI. Carter	-
	12th Division ("Plymouth Division")	12 July 1918	No Combat	Maj. Gen. Henry P. McCain	-
	13th Division ("Lucky 13th")	16 July 1918	No Combat	Brig. Gen. Cornelius Vanderbilt; Brig. Gen. Frank B. Watson; Maj. Gen. Joseph D. Leitch	-
	14th Division ("Wolverine Division")	9 July 1918	No Combat	Brig. Gen. Howard L. Laubach; Maj. Gen. Grote Hutcheson	-
Insignia Never Selected	15th Division	31 July 1918	No Combat	Brig. Gen. Guy V. Henry Jr.	-
	16th Division	31 July 1918	No Combat	Maj. Gen. David C. Shanks; Maj. Gen. Guy Carleton	-
	17th Division	31 July 1918	No Combat	Maj. Gen. Henry C. Hodges Jr.	-
	18th Division ("Cactus Division")	31 July 1918	No Combat	Brig. Gen. George H. Estes; Brig. Gen. Frederick B. Shaw	-
Insignia Never Selected	19th Division	31 July 1918	No Combat	Brig. Gen. Benjamin T. Simmons; Maj. Gen. Charles C. Ballou	-
	20th Division	31 July 1918	No Combat	Brig. Gen. E. Leroy Sweetser; Maj. Gen. Harry F Hodges	-

==== National Guard ====
Infantry Divisions
Shoulder Sleeve Insignia	Name (National Guard units from)	Activated	Entered Combat	Commanding General	Campaigns
	26th Division ("Yankee Division") (Connecticut, Maine, Massachusetts, New Hampshire, Rhode Island, Vermont)	18 July 1917	10 April 1918	Maj. Gen. Clarence R. Edwards; Brig. Gen. Frank E. Bamford	Champagne-Marne; Aisne-Marne; Saint-Mihiel; Meuse–Argonne
	27th Division ("New York Division" and "Orion Division") (New York)	15 July 1917	25 July 1918	Maj. Gen. John F. O'Ryan	Somme Offensive; Ypres-Lys; Meuse–Argonne (Artillery Only)
	28th Division ("Keystone Division") (Pennsylvania)	5 August 1917	14 July 1918	Maj. Gen. Charles H. Muir; Maj. Gen. William H. Hay	Champagne-Marne; Oise-Aisne; Aisne-Marne; Saint-Mihiel; Meuse–Argonne
	29th Division ("Blue and Grey Division") (Delaware, Maryland, New Jersey, Virginia, Washington D.C.)	18 July 1917	29 September 1918	Maj. Gen. Charles G. Morton	Meuse–Argonne
	30th Division ("Old Hickory Division") (Georgia, North Carolina, South Carolina, Tennessee)	28 August 1917	5 July 1918	Maj. Gen. John F. Morrison; Maj. Gen. Clarence P. Townsley; Maj. Gen. George W. Read; Maj. Gen. Edward M. Lewis	Somme Offensive; Ypres-Lys
	31st Division ("Dixie Division") (Alabama, Florida, Georgia)	25 August 1917	No Combat (Depot Division)	Maj. Gen. Francis J. Kernan; Brig. Gen. John L. Hayden; Maj. Gen. Francis H. French; Maj. Gen. LeRoy S. Lyon	-
	32nd Division ("Les Terribles"; "Red Arrow Division") (Michigan and Wisconsin)	26 August 1917	15 July 1918	Maj. Gen. James Parker; Maj. Gen. William G. Haan; Maj. Gen. William Lassiter	Oise-Aisne; Aisne-Marne; Meuse–Argonne
	33rd Division ("Prairie Division") (Illinois)	25 August 1917	17 July 1918	Maj. Gen. George Bell Jr.	Somme Offensive; Meuse–Argonne
	34th Division ("Red Bull Division") (Iowa, Nebraska, North Dakota, South Dakota)	18 July 1917	No Combat (Depot Division)	Maj. Gen. Augustus P. Blocksom; Brig. Gen. John A. Johnston; Maj. Gen. Charles D. Rhodes	-
	35th Division ("Santa Fe Division") (Kansas and Missouri)	18 July 1917	26 September 1918	Maj. Gen. William M. Wright; Brig. Gen. Nathaniel F. McClure; Maj. Gen. Peter E. Traub	Meuse–Argonne
	36th Division ("Texas Division" or "Arrowhead Division") (Texas and Oklahoma)	18 July 1917	10 October 1918	Maj. Gen. Edwin St. John Greble; Maj. Gen. William R. Smith	Meuse–Argonne
	37th Division ("Buckeye Division") (Ohio)	26 August 1917	4 August 1918	Maj. Gen. Charles Treat; Brig. Gen. Joseph A. Gaston; Maj. Gen. Charles S. Farnsworth	Meuse–Argonne; Ypres-Lys
	38th Division ("Cyclone Division") (Indiana, Kentucky, West Virginia)	25 August 1917	No Combat (Depot Division)	Maj. Gen. William H. Sage; Brig. Gen. William V. Judson; Augustine McIntyre Jr. Brig. Gen. Frank M. Caldwell; Maj. Gen. Robert Lee Howze	-
	39th Division ("Delta Division") (Arkansas, Louisiana, Mississippi)	18 July 1917	No Combat (Depot Division)	Maj. Gen. Henry C. Hodges Jr. Brig. Gen. Ira A. Haynes	-
	40th Division ("Sunshine Division") (Arizona, California, Colorado, Nevada, New Mexico, Utah)	18 July 1917	No Combat (Depot Division)	Maj. Gen. Frederick S. Strong; Brig. Gen. LeRoy S. Lyon; Brig. Gen. George H. Cameron	-
	41st Division ("Sunset Division") (Idaho, Montana, Oregon, Washington, Wyoming)	18 July 1917	No Combat (Depot Division)	Maj. Gen. Hunter Liggett; Brig. Gen. Henry Jervey; Brig. Gen. George L. Irwin; Brig. Gen. Richard Coulter Jr. Brig. Gen. Robert Alexander; Brig. Gen. Edward Vollrath; Maj. Gen. John E. McMahon; Brig. Gen. Eli K. Cole, USMC; Maj. Gen. Peter E. Traub	Meuse–Argonne (Artillery Only)
	42nd Division ("Rainbow Division")	1 August 1917	16 June 1918	Maj. Gen. William A. Mann; Maj. Gen. Charles T. Menoher; Maj. Gen. Charles D. Rhodes; Brig. Gen. Douglas MacArthur	Champagne-Marne; Saint-Mihiel; Meuse–Argonne

==== National Army (76th-93rd) ====
Infantry Divisions
Shoulder Sleeve Insignia	Name	Activated	Entered Combat	Commanding General	Campaigns
	76th Division ("Liberty Bell Division"; "Onaway Division")	25 August 1917	No Combat (Depot Division)	Maj. Gen. Harry F. Hodges; Brig. Gen. William Weigel; Brig. Gen. Frank H. Albright	-
	77th Division ("Statue of Liberty Division")	5 August 1917	21 June 1918	Maj. Gen. J. Franklin Bell; Maj. Gen. George B. Duncan; Brig. Gen. Evan M. Johnson; Maj. Gen. Robert Alexander	Oise-Aisne; Meuse–Argonne
	78th Division ("Lightning Division")	5 August 1917	12 September 1918	Maj. Gen. Chase W. Kennedy; Brig. Gen. John S. Mallory; Brig. Gen. James T. Dean; Maj. Gen. Hugh L. Scott; Maj. Gen. James McRae	Saint-Mihiel; Meuse–Argonne
	79th Division ("Cross of Lorraine Division")	5 August 1917	15 September 1918	Maj. Gen. Joseph E. Kuhn	Meuse–Argonne
	80th Division ("Blue Ridge Division")	5 August 1917	23 July 1917	Brig. Gen. Herman Hall; Maj. Gen. Adelbert Cronkhite; Brig. Gen. Lloyd M. Brett; Brig. Gen. Wilds P. Richardson; Brig. Gen. Charles S. Farnsworth; Maj. Gen. Samuel D. Sturgis Jr.	Somme Offensive; Meuse–Argonne
	81st Division ("Wildcat Division")	5 August 1917	2 November 1918	Maj. Gen. Charles H. Barth; Maj. Gen. Charles J. Bailey; Brig. Gen. George W. McIver	Meuse–Argonne
	82nd Division ("All-American Division")	5 August 1917	18 July 1918	Maj. Gen. Eben Swift; Maj. Gen. William P. Burnham; Maj. Gen. George B. Duncan	Saint-Mihiel; Meuse–Argonne
	83rd Division ("Ohio Division")	5 August 1917	None (Depot Division)	Maj. Gen. Edwin F. Glenn; Brig. Gen. Willard A. Holbrook	Vittorio Veneto (332nd Infantry only)
	84th Division ("Railsplitters")	5 August 1917	None (Depot Division)	Maj. Gen. Harry C. Hale; Brig. Gen. Wilber E. Wilder	-
	85th Division ("Custer Division")	5 August 1917	None (Depot Division)	Maj. Gen. Joseph T. Dickman; Maj. Gen. James Parker; Maj. Gen. Chase W. Kennedy	-
	86th Division ("Blackhawk Division")	5 August 1917	None (Depot Division)	Maj. Gen. Thomas H. Barry; Brig. Gen. Lyman W. V. Kennon; Maj. Gen. Charles Martin; Brig. Gen. Lincoln C. Andrews; Maj. Gen. Charles C. Ballou	-
	87th Division ("Golden Acorn Division")	5 August 1917	None (Depot Division)	Maj. Gen. Samuel D. Sturgis; Brig. Gen. William F. Martin	-
	88th Division ("Fighting Blue Devils"; "Clover Leaf Division")	5 August 1917	7 October 1918	Maj. Gen. Edward H. Plummer; Brig. Gen. Robert N. Getty; Brig. Gen. William D. Beach; Maj. Gen. William Weigel	Meuse–Argonne
	89th Division ("Rolling W")	5 August 1917	12 September 1918	Maj. Gen. Leonard Wood; Maj. Gen. William M. Wright; Maj. Gen. Frank L. Winn	Saint-Mihiel; Meuse–Argonne
	90th Division ("Tough 'Ombres")	5 August 1917	12 September 1918	Maj. Gen. Henry T. Allen; Maj. Gen. Charles Martin	Saint-Mihiel; Meuse–Argonne
	91st Division ("Pine Tree Division"; "Wild West Division")	5 August 1917	26 September 1918	Maj. Gen. Henry A. Greene; Maj. Gen. William Johnston Jr.	Meuse–Argonne
	92nd Division (Colored) ("Buffalo Soldiers")	24 October 1917	26 September 1918	Maj. Gen. Charles C. Ballou; Maj. Gen. Charles Martin; Brig. Gen. James B. Erwin	Meuse–Argonne
	93rd Division (Colored) ("Blue Helmets") (only infantry organized)	23 November 1917	8 April 1918	Brig. Gen. Roy Hoffman	Third Aisne; Second Marne

==== National Army (94th-102nd) ====
Infantry Divisions
Shoulder Sleeve Insignia	Name	Activated	Commanding General	Area of Origin
	94th Division (Only Infantry Organized)	6 June 1918	None	Puerto Rico
	95th Division (Not Fully Organized)	5 September 1918	Col. Julien E. V. Gaujot; Col. Edward Croft; Brig. Gen. Mathew C. Smith	-
	96th Division (Not Fully Organized)	5 September 1918	Maj. Gen. Guy Carleton	-
	97th Division (Not Fully Organized)	5 September 1918	Col. Carl A. Martin; Brig. Gen. James R. Lindsay	Minnesota; Oklahoma
	98th Division (Only HQ Organized)	23 July 1918	Col. Jennings B. Wilson (Chief of Staff)	-
	99th Division (Only HQ Organized)	23 July 1918	Lt. Col. Paul W. Beck (Chief of Staff)	-
	100th Division (Only HQ Organized)	23 July 1918	Col. William L. Reed (Chief of Staff)	-
	101st Division (Only HQ Organized)	23 July 1918	Col. Patrick H. Mullay (Chief of Staff)	-
	102nd Division (Only Cadre Organized)	23 July 1918	None	-

== Brigades ==
=== Infantry brigades ===
==== Regular Army ====
Infantry Brigades
Shoulder Sleeve Insignia	Name	Parent Organization	Activated	Organic Units	Commanding General
	1st Infantry Brigade	1st Division	May 24, 1917	16th Infantry Regiment; 18th Infantry Regiment; 2nd Machine Gun Battalion	Brig. Gen. Omar Bundy; Brig Gen. George B. Duncan; Brig. Gen. John L. Hines; Brig. Gen. Frank Parker; Col. Hjalmar Erickson
	2nd Infantry Brigade	1st Division	May 24, 1917	26th Infantry Regiment; 28th Infantry Regiment; 3rd Machine Gun Battalion	Brig. Gen. Robert Lee Bullard; Brig. Gen. Beaumont B. Buck; Brig. Gen. Frank E. Bamford; Brig. Gen. George C. Barnhardt; Brig. Gen. Francis Marshall
	3rd Infantry Brigade	2nd Division	October 6, 1917	9th Infantry Regiment; 23rd Infantry Regiment; 5th Machine Gun Battalion	Col. Walter K. Wright; Brig. Gen. Peter Murray; Brig. Gen. Edward M. Lewis; Brig. Gen. Hanson E. Ely; Col. Robert O. Van Horn; Col. James C. Rhea; Brig. Gen. Charles E. Kilbourne; Brig. Gen. Thomas W. Darrah; Brig. Gen. Paul B. Malone
	4th Marine Brigade	2nd Division	October 23, 1917	5th Marine Regiment; 6th Marine Regiment; 6th Machine Gun Battalion	Brig. Gen. Charles A. Doyen; Brig. Gen. James Harbord; Brig. Gen. John Lejeune; Brig. Gen. Wendell C. Neville

=== Depot brigades ===
The role of depot brigades was to receive and organize recruits, provide them with uniforms, equipment and initial military training, and then send them to France to fight on the front lines. The depot brigades also received soldiers returning home at the end of the war and completed their out processing and discharges. Depot brigades were often organized, reorganized, and inactivated as requirements to receive and train troops rose and fell, and later ebbed and flowed during post-war demobilization.

Depot brigades were organized into numbered battalions (1st Battalion, 2d Battalion, etc.), which in turn were organized into numbered companies.

The major U.S. depot brigades organized for World War I, which remained active until after post-war demobilization included:

- 151st (Camp Devens)
- 152d (Camp Upton)
- 153d (Camp Dix)
- 154th (Camp Meade)
- 155th (Camp Lee)
- 156th (Camp Jackson)
- 157th (Camp Gordon)
- 158th (Camp Sherman)
- 159th (Camp Taylor)
- 160th (Camp Custer)
- 161st (Camp Grant)
- 162d (Camp Pike)
- 163d (Camp Dodge)
- 164th (Camp Funston)
- 165th (Camp Travis)
- 166th (Camp Lewis)
- 167th (Camp McClellan)

== Technical Services ==
=== Motor transport Corps ===
- Motor Transport Corps

=== Coast artillery corps ===
- Coast Artillery Corps - provided almost all US-manned heavy and railway artillery units

=== Tank corps ===
- Tank Corps

=== Signal corps ===
- United States Army Signal Corps
- Aviation Section, U.S. Signal Corps
- List of American Aero Squadrons
- List of American Balloon Squadrons
