= James Francis McIndoe =

United States Army general

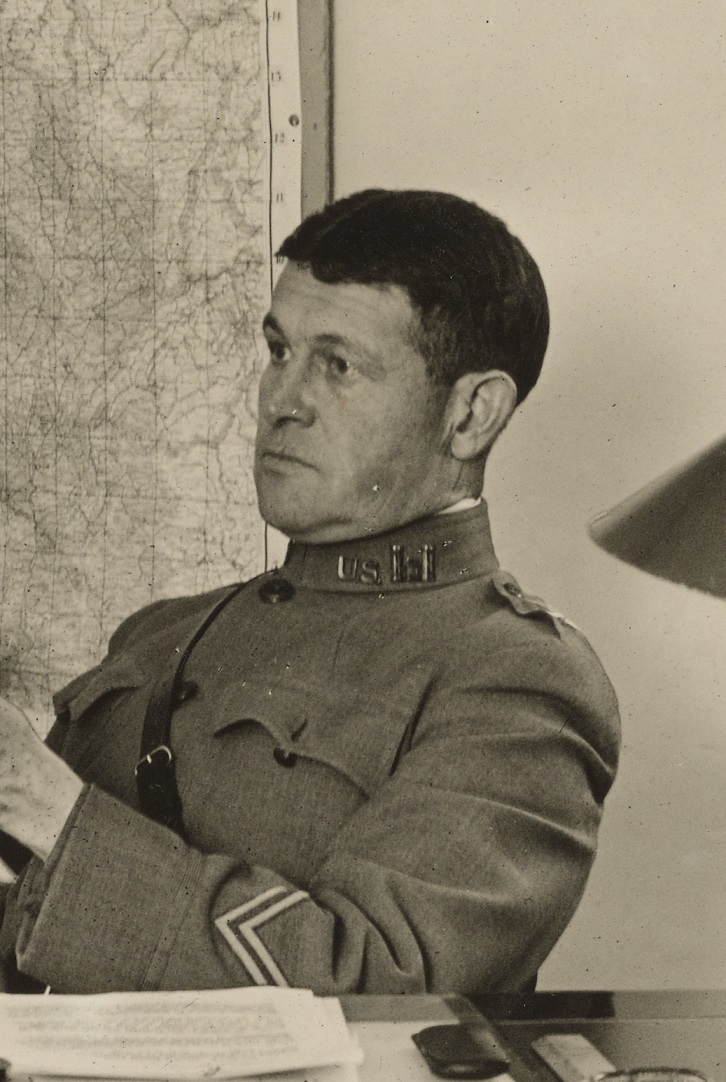
- Brigadier General James Francis McIndoe in his office in Tours, November 25, 1918.
- Born: January 18, 1868; Lonaconing, Maryland, United States
- Died: February 5, 1919 (aged 51); Bazoilles-sur-Meuse, France
- Burial place: Aisne-Marne American Cemetery and Memorial, France
- Military career
- Allegiance: United States
- Branch: United States Army
- Service years: 1891–1919
- Rank: Brigadier General
- Unit: Corps of Engineers
- Commands: 2nd Engineer Battalion; Director of Military Engineers
- Conflicts: Spanish–American War; World War I
- Awards: Army Distinguished Service Medal (posthumously)

Brigadier General James Francis McIndoe (January 18, 1868 – February 5, 1919) was a senior officer of the United States Army. He was involved in conflicts in the Philippines and World War I, where he commanded the 2nd Engineers on the Western Front.

== Military career ==
James F. McIndoe was born in Lonaconing, Maryland 18 January 1868. He graduated fourth in a class of 65 cadets from the United States Military Academy in 1891. Among his classmates included several future general officers, such as Jay Johnson Morrow, Odus Creamer Horney, LeRoy Springs Lyon, Andrew Hero Jr., Tiemann Newell Horn, John W. Heavey, Harry Alexander Smith, Edwin B. Winans, John L. Hines, John Jewsbury Bradley and Hanson Edward Ely. He joined the U.S. Engineer School and became second lieutenant with the Corps of Engineers in 1895. During the Spanish–American War in 1898 McIndoe was responsible for submarine defences in New York Harbor.

After his promotion to captain, he had assignments as an instructor and helped with harbour improvements in the US. In 1914 he was stationed in the Philippines. After his return to the United States, he became lieutenant-colonel with the 2nd Regiment of engineers in 1917.

In late 1917, when the United States joined World War I, McIndoe got a temporary promotion to colonel and commanded the 2nd engineers as part of the American Expeditionary Forces. After assignments for preparing training areas for the US troops in France, he became Chief Engineer of the 4th Corps. He took part in the battles around Château-Thierry and was promoted to brigadier general in October 1918. He was appointed as Director of Military Engineering and Engineering Supplies, a position which he held until his death.

James F. McIndoe died of lobar pneumonia on 5 or 6 February 1919, almost three months after the Armistice with Germany, in Bazoilles-sur-Meuse, France.
