= Hanson Edward Ely =

United States Army general

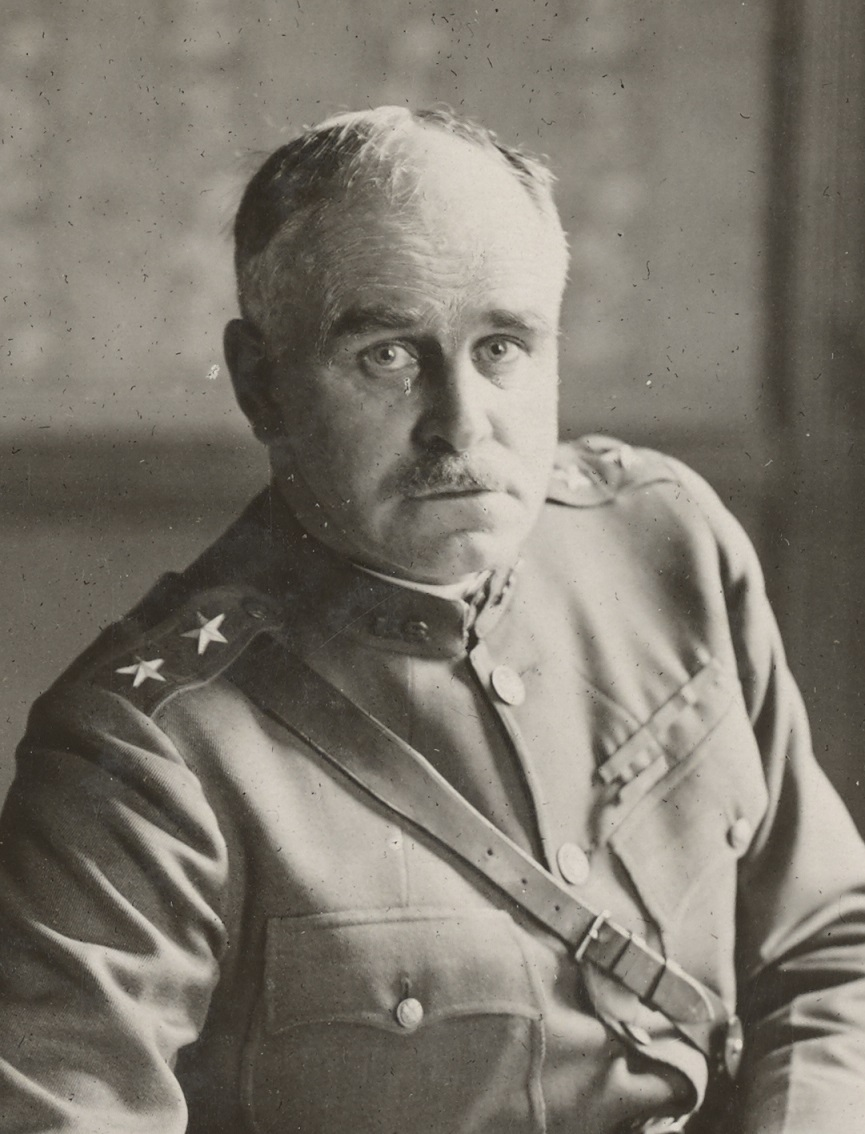
- Maj. General Hanson Edward Ely in Merl, Luxembourg, December 1918.
- Born: November 23, 1867; Independence, Iowa, United States
- Died: April 20, 1958 (aged 90); Atlantic Beach, Florida, United States
- Burial place: Arlington National Cemetery, Virginia, United States
- Military career
- Allegiance: United States
- Branch: United States Army
- Service years: 1891–1931
- Rank: Major General
- Service number: 0-80
- Unit: Infantry Branch
- Commands: Company K, 26th Infantry; 28th Infantry Regiment; 3rd Brigade, 2nd Division; 5th Division; United States Army Command and General Staff College; United States Army War College
- Conflicts: Spanish–American War; United States occupation of Veracruz; World War I
- Awards: Distinguished Service Cross; Army Distinguished Service Medal; Silver Star (2); Legion of Honour; Croix de Guerre (5)

Hanson Edward Ely (November 23, 1867 – April 28, 1958) was a United States Army officer in the late 19th and early 20th centuries. He served in several conflicts, including the Spanish–American War and World War I, and he received the Army Distinguished Service Medal and numerous other awards for his role in them.

== Early life ==
Ely was born in Independence, Iowa, on November 23, 1867, the son of Eugene Hanson Ely and Julia Lamb Ely.

== Early military career ==
After attending various local schools he entered the United States Military Academy (USMA) at West Point, New York in 1887, from where he graduated from there over, 63 in a class of 65, four years later. His classmates included Andrew Hero Jr., James Francis McIndoe, John W. Heavey, John L. Hines, William J. Glasgow, Harold Palmer Howard, Harry Alexander Smith, Lutz Wahl, Palmer E. Pierce, John W. Heavey, Jay Johnson Morrow, LeRoy Springs Lyon, John Jewsbury Bradley and Edwin B. Winans, all future general officers. He was commissioned into the 22nd Infantry Regiment.

After serving in Montana, North Dakota, and Nebraska, Ely became a professor of Military Science and Tactics at the University of Iowa, serving in this position from 1897 to 1898. During the Spanish–American War, Ely reported to his regiment at Camp Wikoff and then served in the Philippines from 1899 to 1901. In addition to commanding General Frederick Funston's mounted scouts, Ely served as a regimental and district adjutant in Luzon. He received his first Silver Star due to his efforts in the Philippines.

Ely graduated from the Infantry and Cavalry School in July 1905 and the Staff College in July 1906. He attended the German Army Maneuvers in 1906, and he again served in the Philippines from 1907 to 1912. Ely twice commanded Company K of the 26th Infantry.

Ely served with Funston on the United States occupation of Veracruz in 1914. He graduated from a course at the United States Army War College in May 1916.

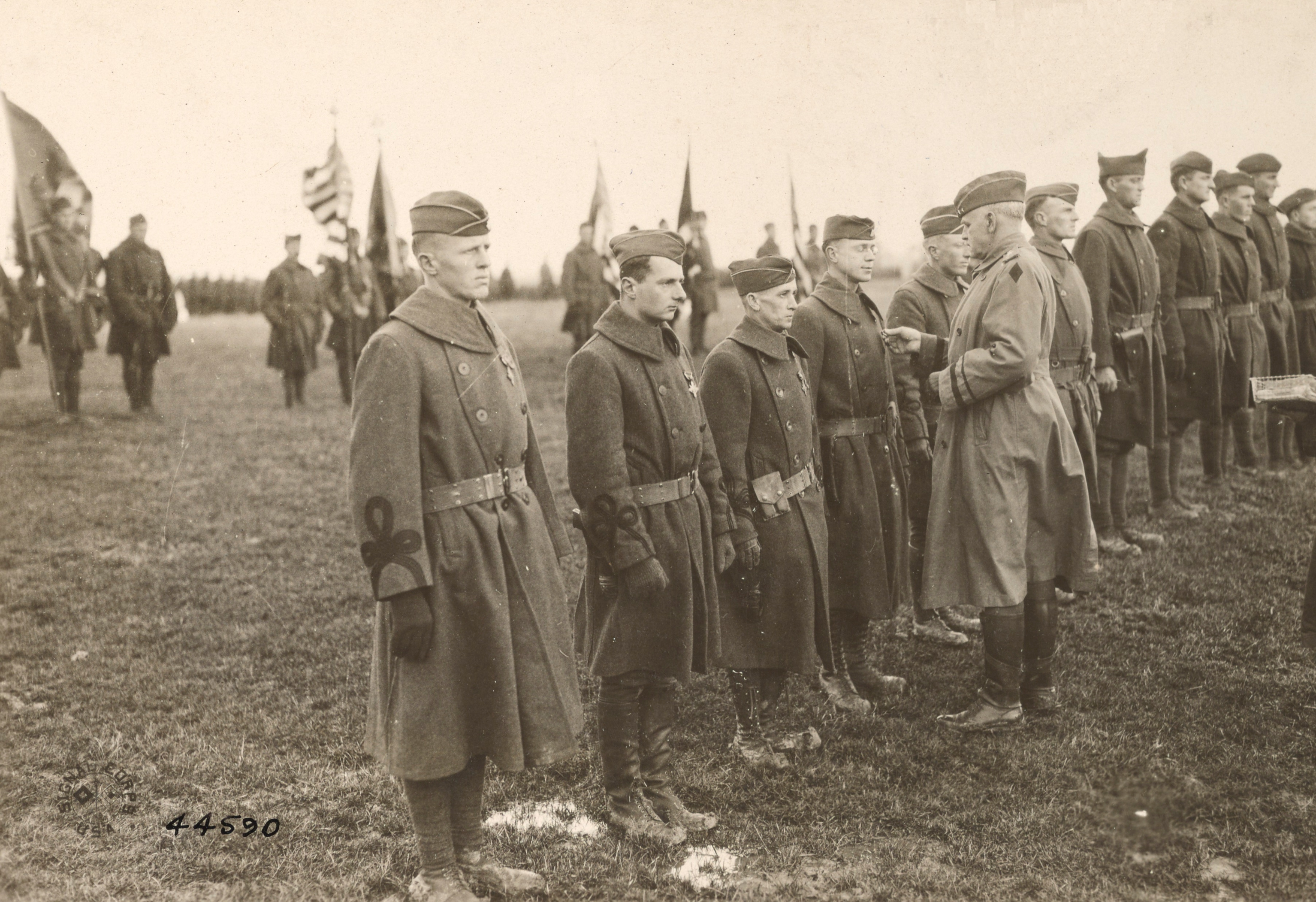
Major General Hanson Edward Ely, commanding the 5th Division, pinning the Distinguished Service Cross on Captain Howard R. MacAdams of the 5th Division's 7th Engineer Regiment, Esch, Luxembourg, December 30, 1918.

== World War I ==
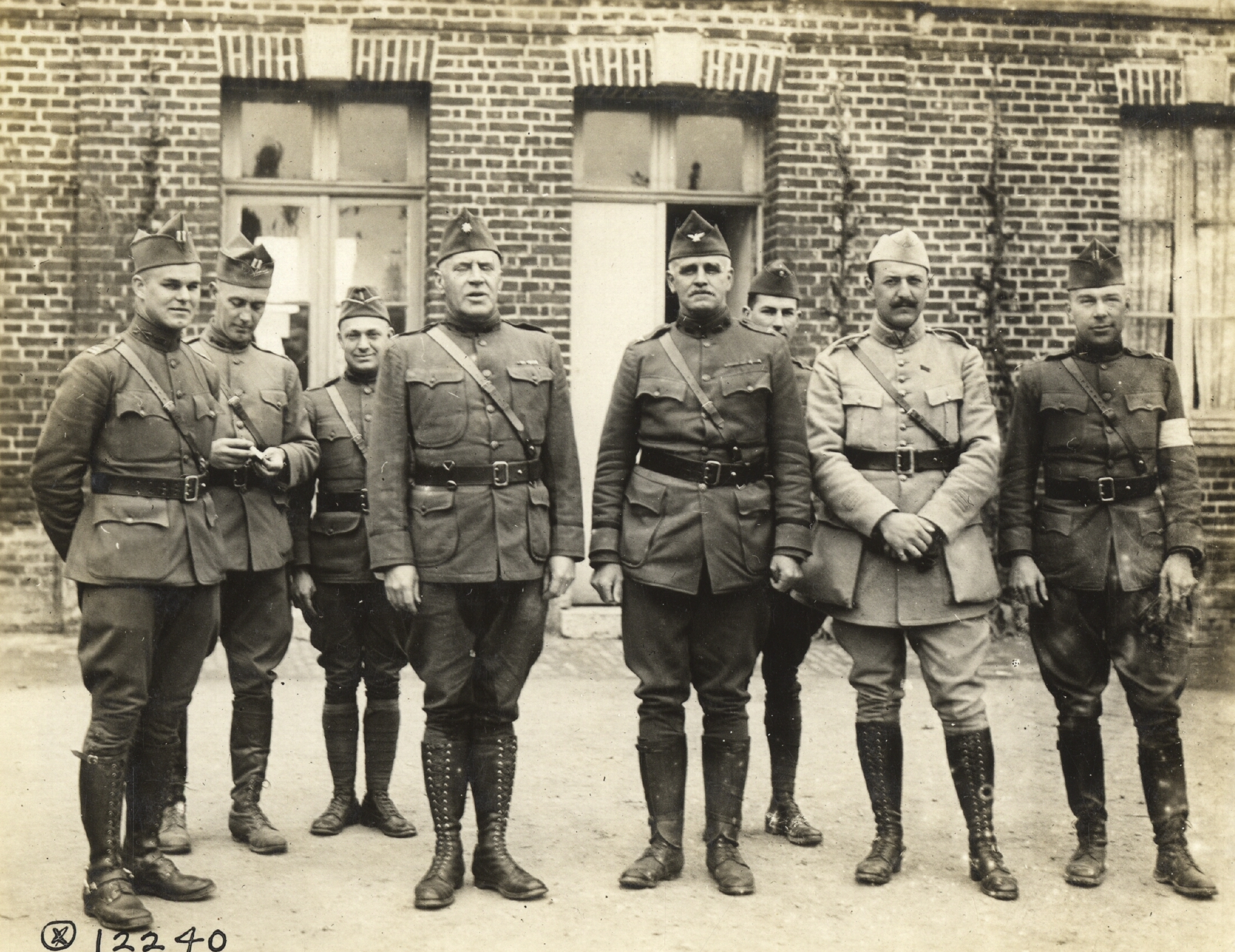
Officers of the 28th Infantry, 1st Division, at the 28th's headquarters near Abbeville, France, April 24, 1918. Stood fifth from the left is Colonel Ely, the regiment's commander.

From July 20 to August 24, 1917, Ely served as the Provost-marshal of the American Expeditionary Forces (AEF) of World War I. He commanded the 28th Infantry Regiment until his promotion to the rank of brigadier general in 1918, when he assumed command of the 3rd Brigade from Major General Edward Mann Lewis, who was promoted to command the 30th Division.

On October 1, 1918, he was promoted to major general, even though his permanent rank was only lieutenant colonel. Starting on November 18, 1918, a week after the Armistice with Germany, Ely assumed command of the 2nd Division and then the 5th Division shortly afterwards. For his actions in the war, he received another Silver Star as well as the Distinguished Service Cross and the Army Distinguished Service Medal. He also received the Legion of Honour and five Croix de Guerres from the French.

== Post-war years ==
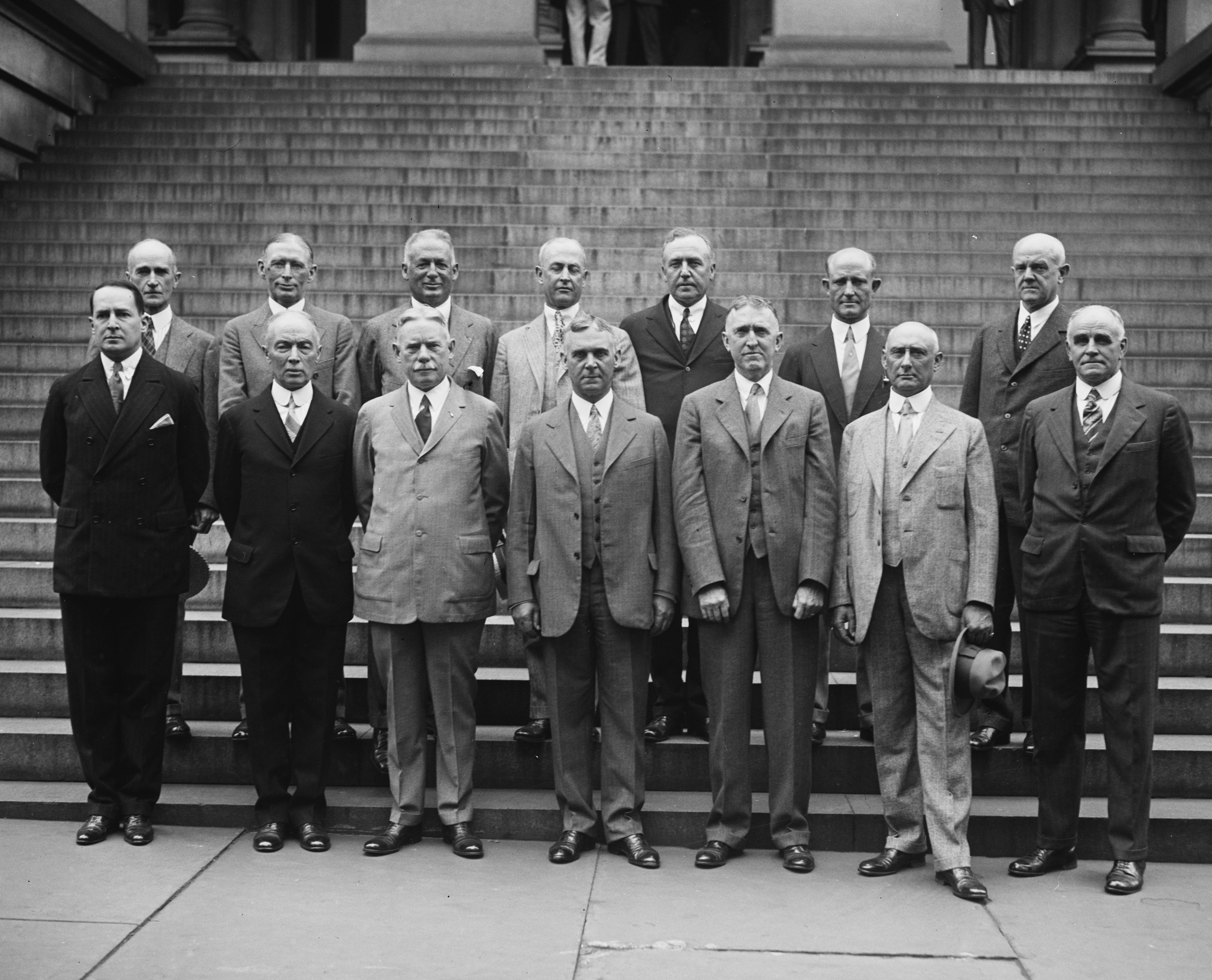
Corps area commanders and division commanders meet with the army chief of staff, Major General Charles Pelot Summerall, at the War Department, May 1927. Stood in the front row, on the extreme right, is Major General Hanson E. Ely, commandant of the Army War College.

After returning to the U.S., Ely reverted to his permanent rank of lieutenant colonel on July 19, 1919. He was promoted to colonel on February 16, 1920, and graduated from a second course at the Army War College in July 1920. Promoted to brigadier general, Ely commanded the 3rd Infantry Brigade again from September 1920 to March 1921. He then served as the Commandant of the United States Army Command and General Staff College from August 1921 to 1923. After his permanent promotion to major general in 1923, Ely became the commandant of the Army War College, a position he served in until 1927. His last assignment was at Second Corps Area on Governors Island in New York. In 1925, he published a report that was highly critical of black soldiers in World War I and recommended the army continue to keep them in segregated units.

Ely retired on November 10, 1931, after reaching the mandatory retirement age of 64.

He died on April 28, 1958, in Atlantic Beach, Florida. Ely is buried in Arlington National Cemetery.

== Bibliography ==
- Bullard, Robert Lee (2013). Fighting Generals: Illustrated Biographical Sketches of Seven Major Generals in World War I. Literary Licensing. ISBN 9781258861193.
- Davis, Henry Blaine Jr. (1998). Generals in Khaki. Raleigh, North Carolina: Pentland Press. ISBN 1571970886. OCLC 40298151.
- Venzon, Anne Cipriano (2013). The United States in the First World War: an Encyclopedia. Hoboken, NJ: Taylor and Francis. ISBN 978-1-135-68453-2. OCLC 865332376.
- Marquis Who's Who (1975). Who Was Who In American History – The Military. Chicago: Marquis Who's Who. ISBN 0837932017.
- Rudd, Herbert Finley (2017). The Official History of the Fifth Division, U. S. A.: During the Period of Its Organization and of Its Operations in the European World War, 1917-1919. The Red Diamond (Meuse) Division. Forgotten Books. ISBN 978-1331115298.

Military offices
Preceded by John E. McMahon	Commanding General 5th Division; 1918−1919	Succeeded by David C. Shanks
Preceded by Hugh Aloysius Drum	Commandant of the United States Army Command and General Staff College; 1921–1923	Succeeded by Harry A. Smith
Preceded by Edward McGlachlin Jr.	Commandant of the United States Army War College; 1923–1927	Succeeded by William Durward Connor
