= Bazoilles-sur-Meuse =

- Commune
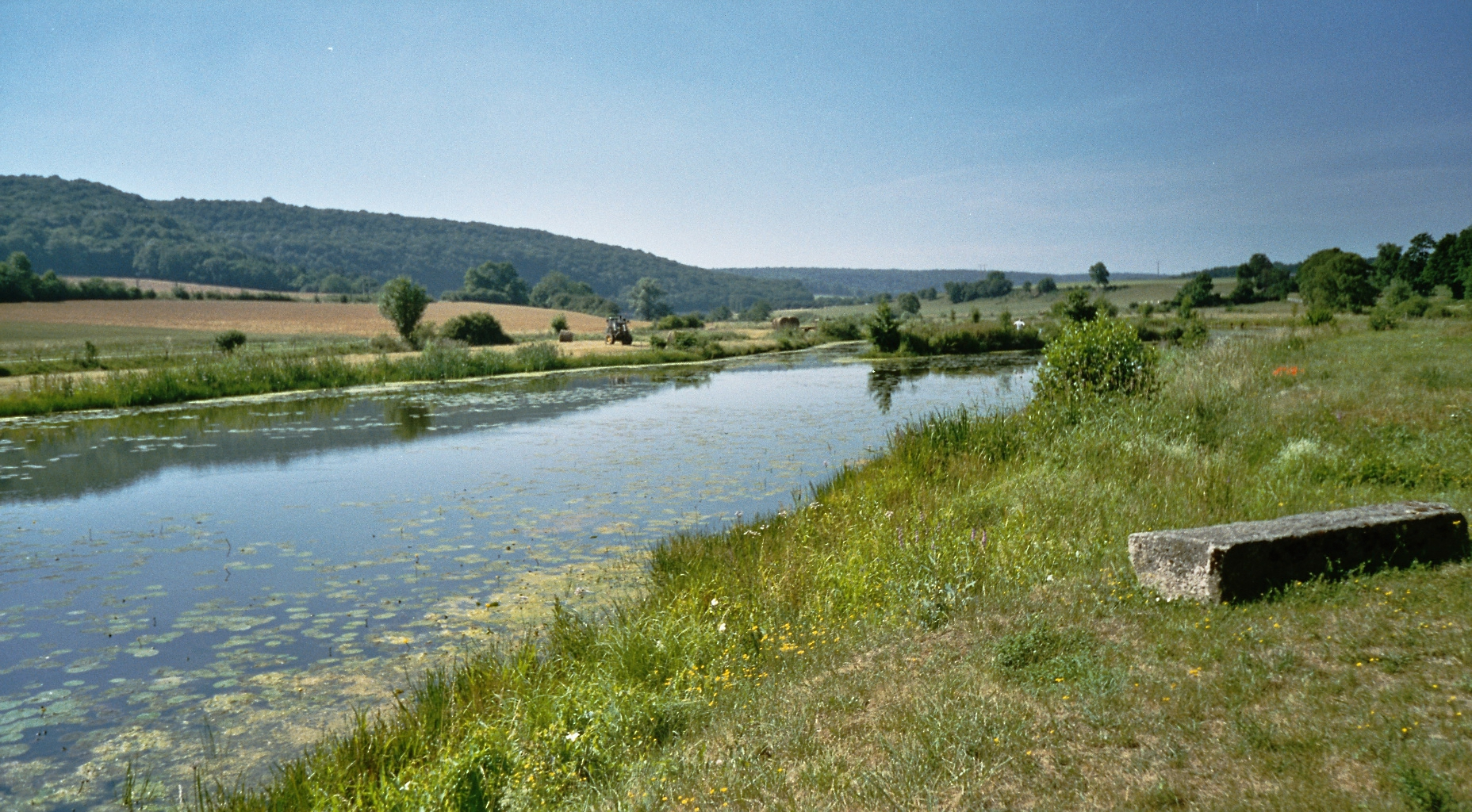
- The Meuse

- Coat of arms
- Location of Bazoilles-sur-Meuse
- Location within France Location within Grand Est
- Coordinates: 48°18′22″N 5°39′36″E
- Country: France
- Region: Grand Est
- Department: Vosges
- Arrondissement: Neufchâteau
- Canton: Neufchâteau
- Intercommunality: CC l'Ouest Vosgien

Government
  - Mayor (2020–2026): Bruno Ory
- Area^{1}: 21.25 km^{2} (8.20 sq mi)
- Highest elevation: 408 m (1,339 ft)
- Lowest elevation: 284 m (932 ft)
- Population (2023): 612
  - Density: 28.8/km^{2} (74.6/sq mi)
- Time zone: UTC+01:00 (CET)
  - Summer (DST): UTC+02:00 (CEST)
- INSEE/Postal code: 88044 /88300
- ^{1} French Land Register data, which excludes lakes, ponds, glaciers > 1 km^{2} (0.386 sq mi or 247 acres) and river estuaries.

Bazoilles-sur-Meuse is a commune in the Vosges department in Grand Est in northeastern France.

== See also ==
- Communes of the Vosges department
