= Edwin B. Winans (soldier) =

United States Army commissioned officer (1869–1947)

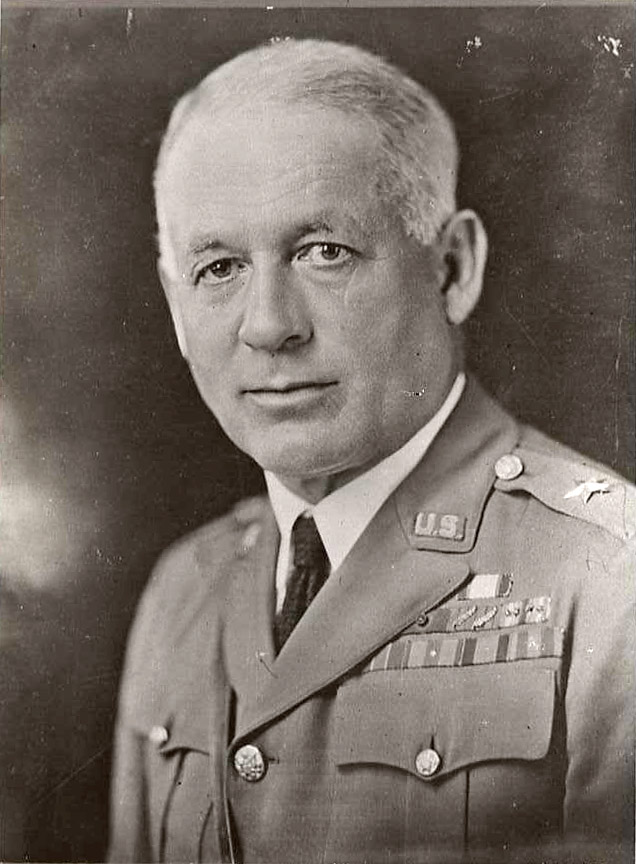
- Born: October 31, 1869; Hamburg, Michigan, U.S.
- Died: December 31, 1947 (aged 78); Washington, D.C., U.S.
- Relatives: Edwin B. Winans (father)
- Military career
- Allegiance: United States
- Branch: United States Army
- Service years: 1891–1933
- Rank: Major General
- Service number: 0-351
- Unit: Cavalry Branch
- Commands: Third United States Army; United States Military Academy; Hawaiian Division; 10th Cavalry Regiment
- Conflicts: World War I Mexican Punitive Expedition; Philippine–American War
- Awards: Army Distinguished Service Medal; Silver Star Citation; Legion of Honour (France); Croix de Guerre (France)

Edwin Baruch Winans (October 31, 1869 – December 31, 1947) was a United States Army officer who attained the rank of major general.

== Early life ==
Winans was born in Hamburg, Michigan as the son of Edwin B. Winans, Governor of Michigan. He attended the United States Military Academy and graduated 19th in a class of 65 in 1891, after which he was commissioned a second lieutenant in the 5th Cavalry on June 12, 1891. Among his classmates there were several men who would, like Winans himself, become general officers in the future, such as Andrew Hero Jr., James F. McIndoe, John W. Heavey, John J. Bradley, LeRoy S. Lyon, John L. Hines, and Hanson E. Ely.

== Military service ==
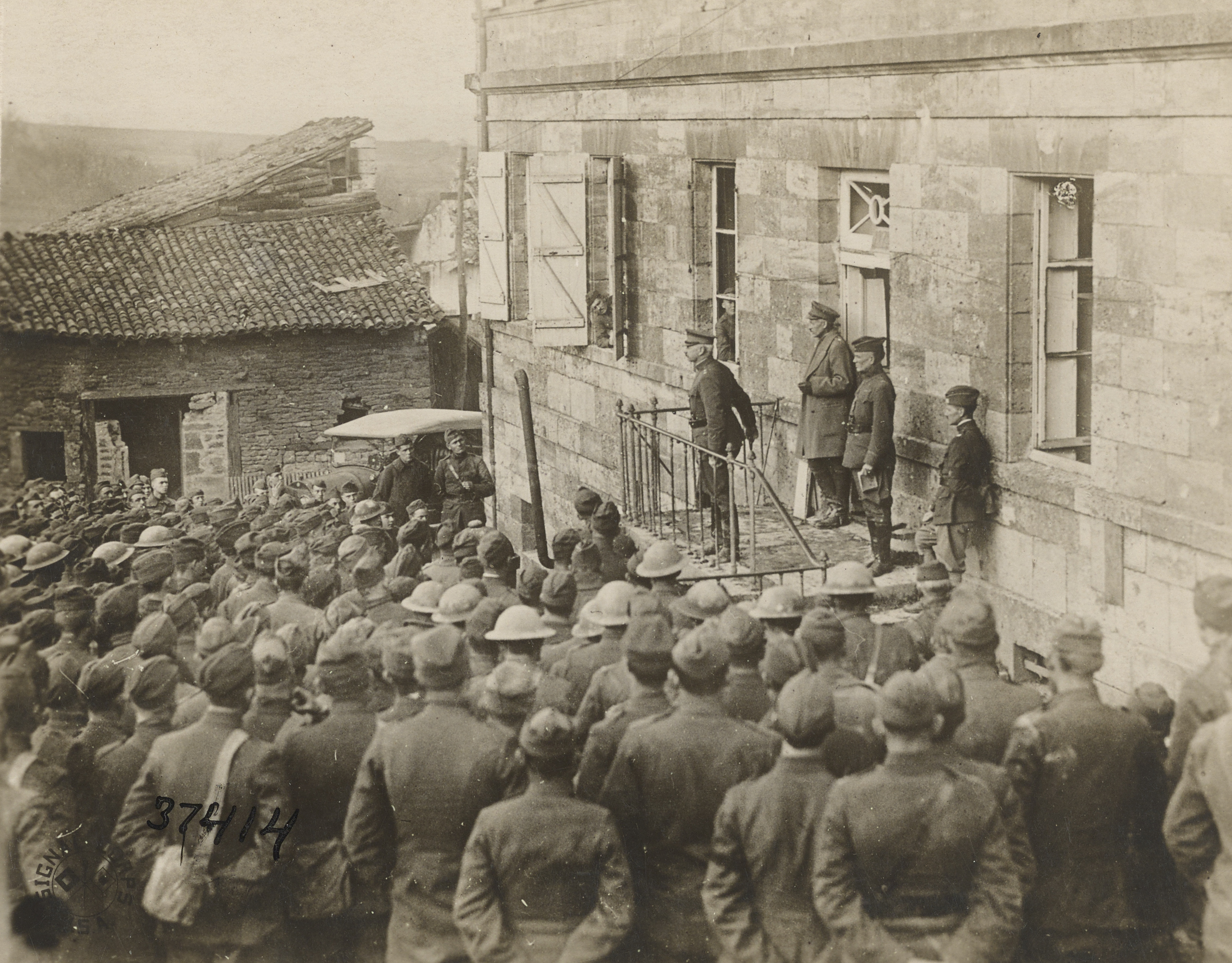
The commander of the 32nd Division, Major General William G. Haan, with Brigadier General Edwin B. Winans, congratulating doughboys of the 127th Regiment, 32nd Division, on their good work and giving them instructions as to their future task of following up the Germans. Pictured here at Breheville, France, November 12, 1918.

Winans served in the Indian Territory and Texas from 1891 to 1897; was a professor of military science and tactics, Michigan Military Academy, from 1897 to 1898; and served with a regiment in the Philippines from 1899 to 1900. He was with the Punitive Expedition in Mexico in 1916 after graduating from the Mounted Service School.

During World War I, Winans commanded the 64th Brigade of the 32d Division, which was then serving in France as part of the American Expeditionary Forces (AEF) from July 1918 onwards. He served with distinction during the war, earning the Army Distinguished Service Medal while in command of the brigade, the citation for which reads:

The President of the United States of America, authorized by Act of Congress, July 9, 1918, takes pleasure in presenting the Army Distinguished Service Medal to Brigadier General Edwin Baruch Winans, United States Army, for exceptionally meritorious and distinguished services to the Government of the United States, in a duty of great responsibility during World War I. General Winans showed marked efficiency and excellent judgment while Commanding the 64th Infantry Brigade, 32d Division, in the actions at the second Battle of the Marne, in the attack and capture of Juvigny, and in the operations of Bois-de-la-Morine, Bois-de-Chene Sec, and Bantheville Woods. In these actions, by his tactical ability, he was always maser of the situation and executed his plans with a confidence that was an inspiration to his troops.

On August 23, 1920, Winans took command of the 10th Cavalry at Fort Huachuca and distinguished himself as a leader able to vastly improve a unit while commanding respect, loyalty, and results. The following year, former Third Army commander Major General Joseph T. Dickman, VIII Corps Area Commanding General, commended him for the condition of the 10th Cavalry, and for the excellent morale and esprit of the regiment.

On the whole, I consider the Tenth Cavalry to be as good, and in some respects better, than the Thirteenth Cavalry, which up to this time, was in the best condition of any regiment I had ever inspected.

Colonel Winans was quick to relate the commendation to his troops, saying that the "officers and men are entitled to equal share in the credit, for without their cooperation, such a showing would have been impossible."

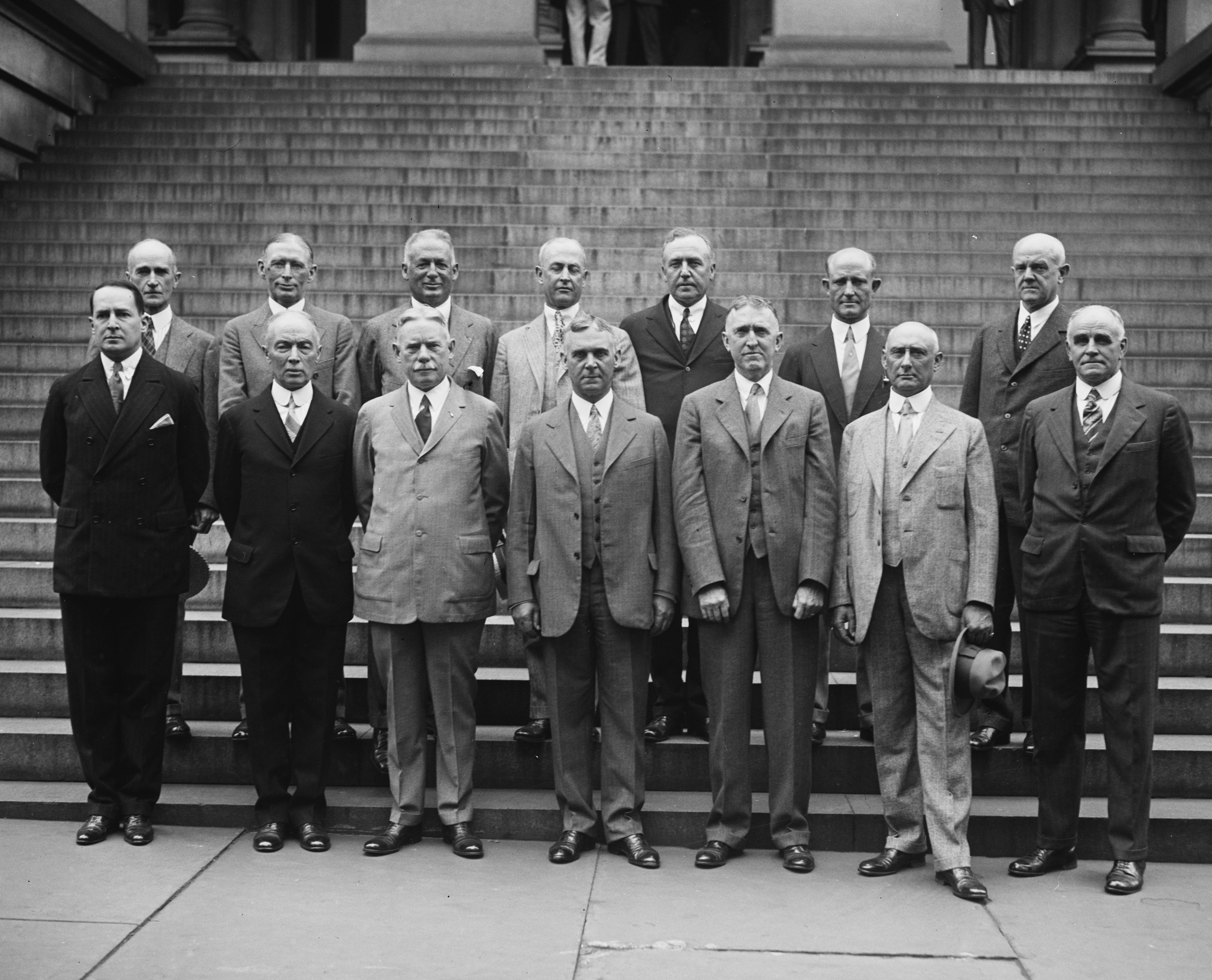
Corps area commanders and division commanders meet with the army chief of staff, Major General Charles Pelot Summerall, at the War Department, May 1927. Stood in the back row, third from the left, is Brigadier General Edwin B. Winans, commanding the 1st Cavalry Division.

In 1927 Winans was assigned as Superintendent of the United States Military Academy. Then he was assigned as commander of the Hawaiian Division. Later, he commanded the 8th Corps Area, Fort Sam Houston, Texas, until he was assigned the task of reactivation of the Third Army. Winans assumed command of the Third Army on September 15, 1932, at Fort Sam Houston, Texas. He retired October 31, 1933. After retirement, he served on a League of Nations commission.

Major General Winans' awards include the Army Distinguished Service Medal "for exceptionally distinguished and meritorious service" during three major offensives; Legion of Honour and Croix de Guerre with two palms by the French Government.

Winans made his home in Vienna, Virginia. He died on December 31, 1947, at Walter Reed Hospital, and was buried in the cemetery at the United States Military Academy on January 3, 1948.

== Bibliography ==
- Davis, Henry Blaine Jr. (1998). Generals in Khaki. Raleigh, North Carolina: Pentland Press. ISBN 1571970886. OCLC 40298151.

Military offices
Preceded by Merch Bradt Stewart	Superintendent of the United States Military Academy; 1927–1928	Succeeded by William Ruthven Smith
Preceded by none (unit was inactive)	Commanding General, Third United States Army; 1932–1933	Succeeded by Johnson Hagood
