= Edward D. Anderson =

United States Army general

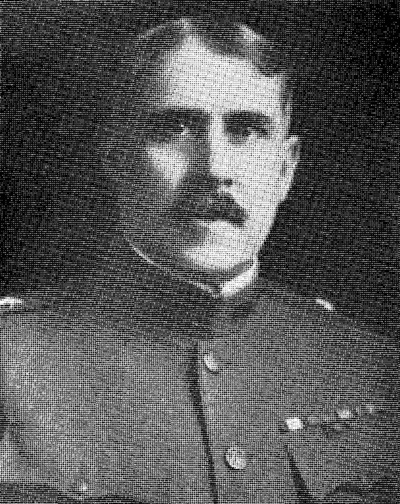
- Born: January 22, 1868; Jasper, Tennessee, U.S.
- Died: May 22, 1940 (aged 72); Washington, D.C., U.S.
- Military career
- Allegiance: United States
- Branch: United States Army
- Service years: 1891–1921
- Rank: Brigadier General
- Conflicts: Spanish–American War; Philippine–American War; World War I
- Awards: Army Distinguished Service Medal; Silver Star

Edward D. Anderson (January 22, 1868 – May 22, 1940) was an American Brigadier general who served during World War I.

== Early life ==
Anderson was born in Jasper, Marion County, Tennessee. He attended Lieutenant Braden's school in Highland Falls, New York before entering the United States Military Academy. He graduated number ten out of sixty-five in the class of 1891.

== Career ==
After graduating, Anderson was commissioned in the Fourth Cavalry and joined his troop at Fort Walla Walla, Washington. In 1895, he graduated from the Infantry and Cavalry School. In 1897, Anderson was transferred to the Tenth Cavalry where he commanded Troop C during the Spanish–American War. He also served as the topographical officer of the Second Cavalry Brigade. Anderson was wounded during the action at San Juan Hill on July 1, 1898, and awarded a Silver Star citation.

From September 1898 to June 1899, he was an instructor of chemistry, geology, and mineralogy at the United States Military Academy. He was promoted to major in July 1899 and served with the 26th United States Volunteer Infantry. In 1901, he reverted to his permanent rank of captain with the 12th Cavalry in south Texas. This Cavalry was in the Philippines from 1903–1905 and once back in the United States Anderson became regimental quartermaster. Anderson attended the Mounted Service School at Fort Riley, Kansas, in 1914 as well as the Army Service School special course in 1915, where he was retained as an instructor. In 1916, he graduated from the United States Army War College.

From May–July 1917, Anderson was an observer with the British and French troops and from August 1917 – August 1921 and he was detailed with the General Staff. From August 8, 1918 to October 31, 1919, he was a brigadier general in the National Army. He was then chairman of the equipment committee of the General staff and then served as Chief of the operations branch until August 1921.

After more than thirty-four years of service, Anderson retired as a colonel on December 21, 1921. He became a brigadier general on the retired list by act of Congress in June 1930.

Anderson died at the Walter Reed Hospital in Washington D.C. on May 22, 1940. He was interred at Arlington National Cemetery three days later.

== Awards ==
- Army Distinguished Service Medal
- Silver Star Citation

== Death and legacy ==
Edward D. Anderson died at the age of seventy-two on May 23, 1940.
