= Spencer Cosby =

U.S. Army officer

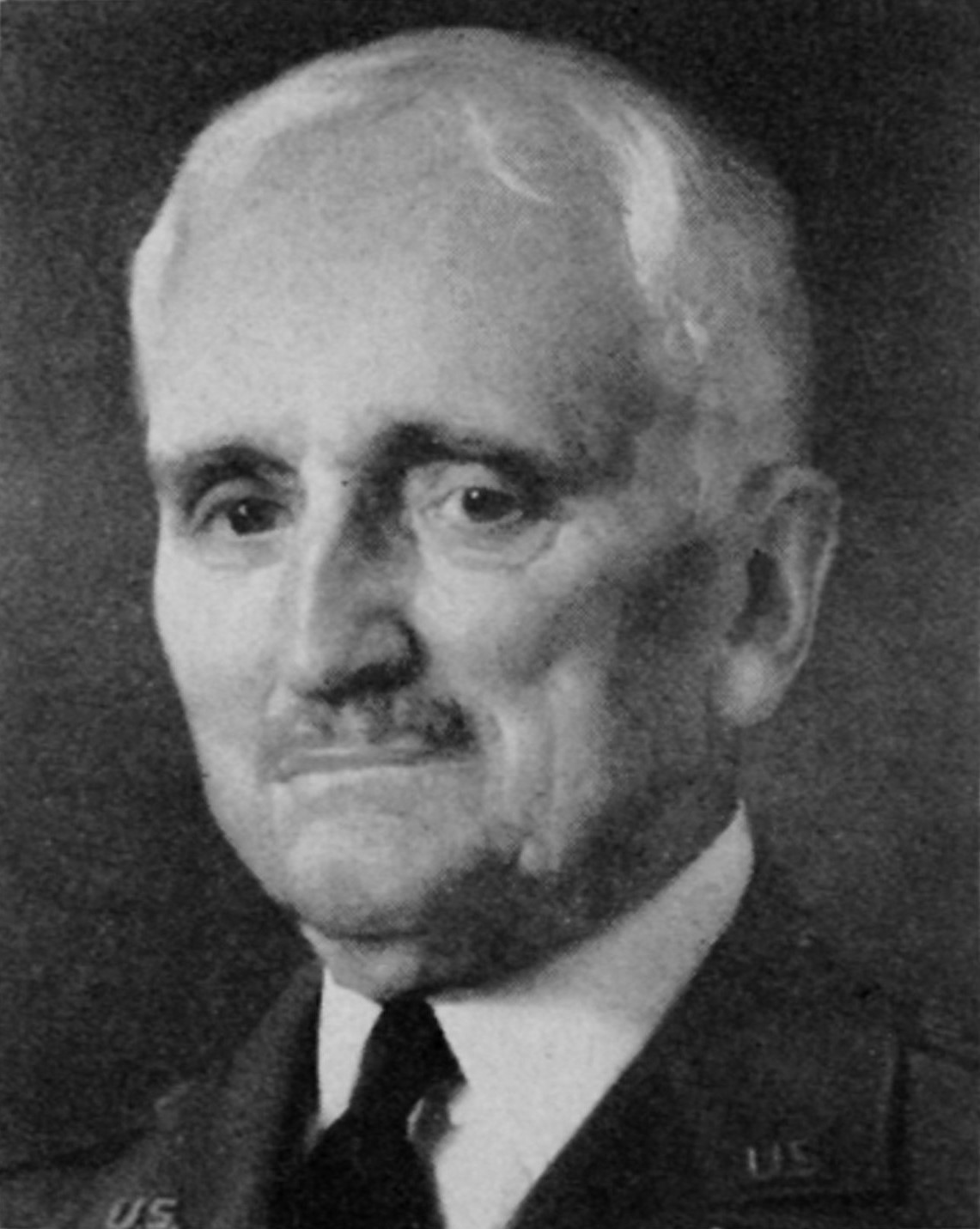

Engineer Commissioner of the District of Columbia
- In office December 21, 1908 – March 15, 1909
- Preceded by: Jay Johnson Morrow
- Succeeded by: William Voorhees Judson

Personal details
- Born: October 2, 1867 Baltimore, Maryland
- Died: March 26, 1962 (aged 94) Washington, D.C.
- Resting place: Arlington National Cemetery
- Spouse: E. Yvonne Shepard
- Profession: military engineer, politician
- Military career
- Allegiance: United States
- Branch: United States Army
- Service years: 1891–1928
- Rank: Colonel
- Conflicts: Spanish–American War; World War I

Spencer Cosby (October 2, 1867 – March 26, 1962) was a U.S. Army officer who served as military attaché of the U.S. Embassy in Paris, France and as Engineering Commissioner of the District of Columbia.

== Biography ==
Cosby was born on October 2, 1867, in Baltimore, Maryland, the son of naval officer Frank Carvill Cosby (April 10, 1840 – February 8, 1905) and his wife Charlotte Malvina Spencer (March 10, 1841 – March 5, 1927). He had two younger brothers. His father served in the Union Navy during the American Civil War and retired as a rear admiral on April 10, 1902.

Cosby was appointed as a military cadet in the United States Military Academy in June 1887 and graduated first in his class four years later, as an officer in the United States Army Corps of Engineers. He then spent three years at Willets Point, New York, graduating from the Engineer School of Application in 1894. Among his subsequent assignments was work on new gun batteries at Fort Delaware in 1897. During the Spanish–American War, Cosby served in Puerto Rico on the staff of Maj. Gen. John R. Brooke from July to October 1898. He received an honorable discharge from the US Volunteers on December 31, 1898, at the rank of major. However, Cosby remained in the regular army, in which he became a captain on February 2, 1901. (Note: It was common for officers to serve in the US Volunteers at a much higher rank than their permanent rank in the Regular Army.)

From May 1903 to August 1905, Cosby served in the Philippines. In December 1905, he was placed in charge of engineering projects for forts, rivers and aqueducts in Maryland and Virginia around Washington, D.C. Promoted to major on June 9, 1907, Cosby served as Engineer Commissioner of the District of Columbia from December 1908 to March 1909. In March 1909, he was placed in charge of public buildings and grounds for the District of Columbia, with the temporary rank of colonel.

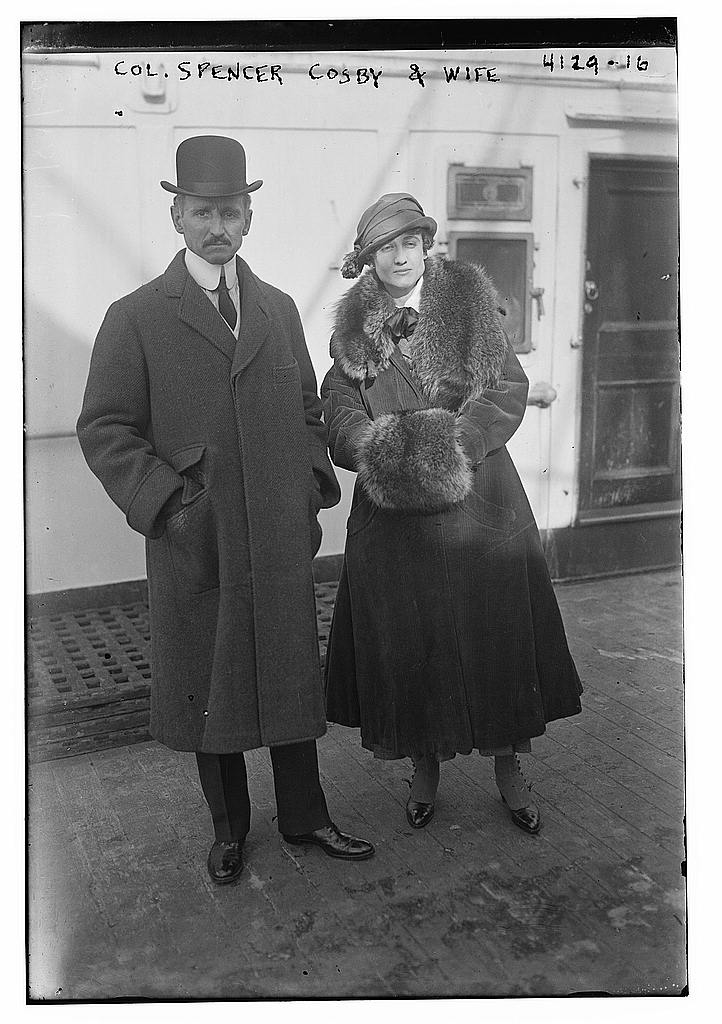
Cosby and his wife circa 1917

On September 16, 1909, in Southampton, New York, he married E. Yvonne Shepard, the daughter of Dr. Charles R. Shepard.

Cosby managed the design and construction of new White House executive offices and the Oval Office. In 1912, he supervised the planting of Japanese cherry trees at the United States Capitol. On August 7, 1913, he was assigned duty as the military attaché at the Embassy of the United States in Paris, France. His permanent rank was increased to lieutenant colonel on February 28, 1915, and he continued to serve at the embassy until January 30, 1917. Cosby was made an officer of the Legion of Honour by France.

Returning to the United States, Cosby served as military aide to Marshal Joseph Joffre from April to May 1917 during his U.S. visit. During World War I, he received another temporary promotion to colonel on August 5, 1917. Cosby commanded the 5th Engineers at Corpus Christi, Texas, the 605th Engineers at Camp Forrest, Georgia and then the 209th Engineers at both Camp Forrest and Camp Sheridan, Alabama. He was assigned as Division Engineer, 9th Division at Camp Sheridan from September 1918 to January 1919.

After the war, Cosby served as district engineer in Galveston, Texas from January 1919 to May 1920. Reduced in rank back to lieutenant colonel on October 6, 1919, his permanent rank was increased to colonel on February 16, 1920. He served as Division Engineer, Southeastern Division in Savannah, Georgia from May 1920 to August 1922 and Division Engineer, Lakes Division in Cleveland, Ohio from September 1922 to June 1928. Cosby retired from active duty on July 31, 1928.

Cosby died at his home in Washington, D.C., on March 26, 1962, at age 94. He was buried in Arlington National Cemetery.
