= John Bradbury Bennet =

United States Army general

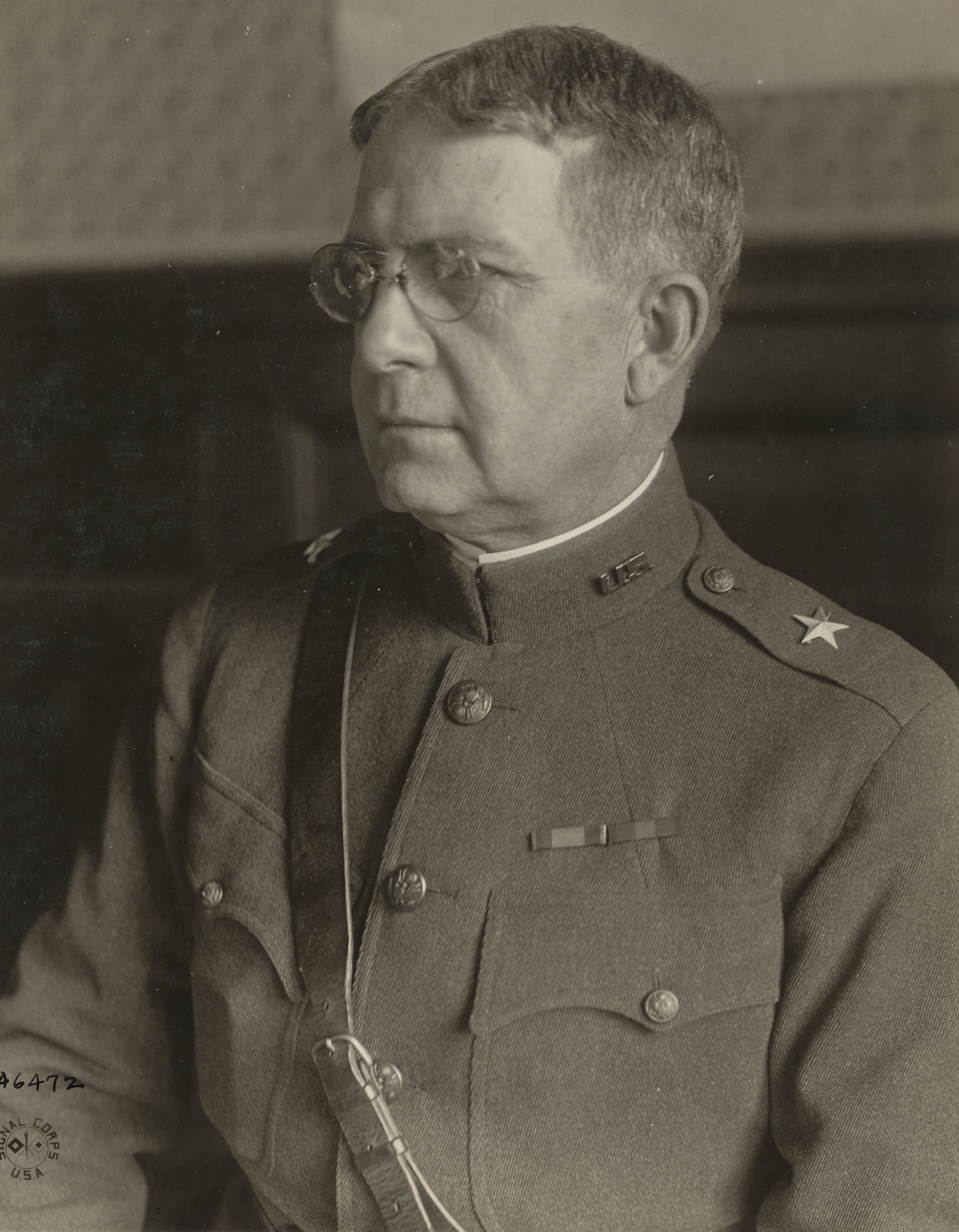
- Bennet as a brigadier general in 1918
- Born: December 6, 1865; New Brunswick, New Jersey, U.S.
- Died: September 2, 1930 (aged 64); Washington, DC, US
- Spouse: Ellen "Nelly" Dent Sharp (m. 1891)
- Children: 3
- Military career
- Branch: United States Army
- Service years: 1891–1925
- Rank: Brigadier General
- Service number: 0-324
- Unit: US Army Infantry Branch
- Commands: 49th Infantry Regiment; 11th Infantry Regiment; Camp Forrest; Casual Officers Depot, Blois; Base Section No. 4 Camp Meade
- Wars: Spanish–American War; Philippine–American War; Mexican Border War; World War I
- Awards: Legion of Honor (Officer)

John Bradbury Bennet (December 6, 1865 – September 2, 1930) was an American army officer and brigadier general active during World War I.

== Early life ==
Bennet was born in New Brunswick, New Jersey. He graduated from the United States Military Academy number twenty-eight of sixty-five in the class of 1891.

== Career ==
Upon graduation, Bennet was commissioned in the Seventh Infantry which was stationed at Fort Lupton, Colorado.

During the Spanish–American War, Bennett was aide to General Henry Merriam, and during the Philippine insurrection, he commanded a company of the 16th Infantry. Later, he was assistant commandant and inspector of the Philippine Constabulary under General Henry T. Allen. He organized a school for the constabulary in Baguio.

In 1917, he was assistant chief of the Aviation Section of the Signal Corps, as a lieutenant colonel. He was in command of embarkation at Camp Merritt, New Jersey. In France he commanded the 11th Infantry. On October 1, 1918, Bennett became a brigadier general and commanded a casual officers' detachment and Base Section Number 4 at LeHarve.

After the war, Bennet operated the demobilization camp at Camp Meade, Maryland, then served on the War Department General Staff. He graduated in 1921 from the Army War College and in 1930 from the General Staff School at Fort Leavenworth, Kansas. In 1925, he retired as a colonel and was promoted to brigadier general on the retired list in 1930.

== Awards ==
Bennet was made an officer of the Legion of Honor from France.

== Death and legacy ==
John Bradbury Bennet died at the age of sixty-four on September 2, 1930. and is buried in Arlington National Cemetery in Section: 7, Site: 9025

== Bibliography ==
- Davis, Henry Blaine Jr. Generals in Khaki. Raleigh, NC: Pentland Press, 1998. ISBN 1571970886 OCLC 231779136
