= Harold Palmer Howard =

United States Army general

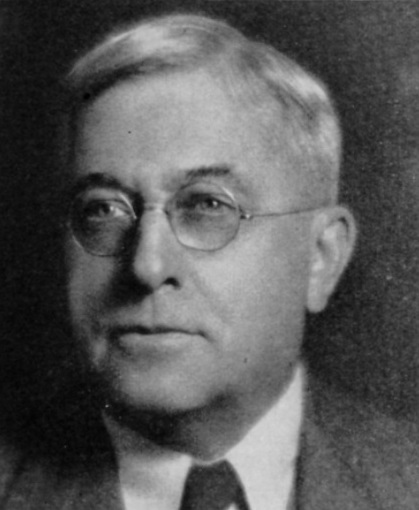
- From the October 1951 edition of Assembly magazine
- Born: November 24, 1866; Sauk Centre, Minnesota
- Died: March 1, 1951 (aged 84); Minneapolis, Minnesota
- Burial place: Greenwood Cemetery, Sauk Centre, Minnesota
- Military career
- Allegiance: United States
- Service: Army
- Service years: 1891–1920
- Rank: Brigadier General
- Service number: 0-13442
- Awards: Silver Star (2)

Harold Palmer Howard (November 24, 1866 – March 1, 1951) was a brigadier general in the United States Army during World War I.

== Education and military career ==
He attended the United States Military Academy at West Point, New York, and graduated 23rd in a class of 65 in June 1891.

On February 2, 1901, he was appointed to the rank of captain and served with the 14th Cavalry. This was followed by a tour as quartermaster at Fort Keogh, Montana, in charge of the Remount Depot from June 24, 1909, to December 1912.

Before World War I, Howard participated in the Spanish–American War and the Philippine insurrection. His Silver Star citations are from his service there. During World War I, he commanded the 82nd Field Artillery Regiment and the 17th Field Artillery Brigade.

He retired as a colonel in 1920, but his rank of brigadier general was restored by act of Congress in June 1930.

After serving in the U.S. Army, Howard was a professor of military sciences and tactics at St. Thomas College in St. Paul, Minneapolis.

== Civilian career ==
Howard was later employed by the Federal Serve Bank in Minneapolis.
