= Odus Creamer Horney =

United States Army general

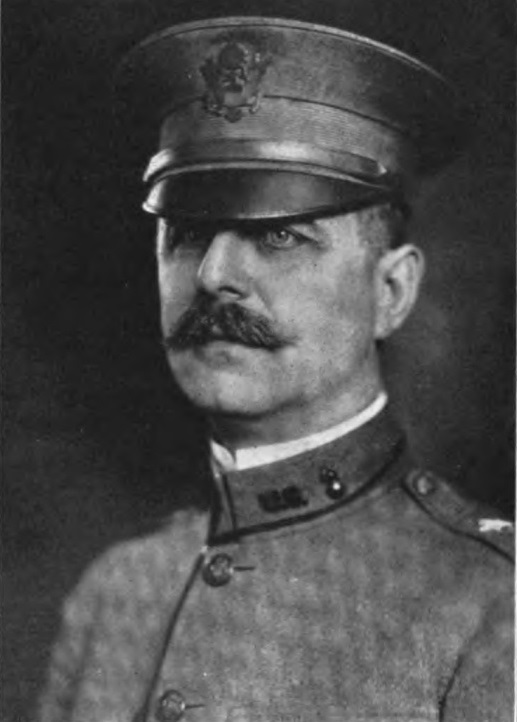
- From 1938's The National Cyclopædia of American Biography
- Born: September 18, 1866; Lexington, Illinois, US
- Died: February 16, 1957 (aged 90); San Francisco, California, US
- Burial place: San Francisco National Cemetery
- Spouse: Kezia Bryan (m. 1891)
- Children: 4
- Relatives: Elbert L. Ford (son-in-law)
- Military career
- Allegiance: United States
- Service: United States Army
- Service years: 1891–1915, 1917–1930
- Rank: Brigadier General
- Service number: 0-434
- Conflicts: World War I

Odus Creamer Horney (September 18, 1866 – February 16, 1957) was an officer of the U.S. Army from 1891 to 1930. Horney transferred from infantry to ordnance in 1894. He co-designed the M1903 Springfield rifle and invented the smokeless powder plant factory. During World War I, Horney returned to serve as lieutenant colonel, colonel and brigadier general. In 1919, Horney was reappointed as lieutenant colonel and later served as ordnance officer of the Philippine Department.

== Early life ==
Odus Creamer Horney was born to James W. Horney and Josephine Creamer Horney in Lexington, Illinois on September 18, 1866. Horney graduated from the United States Military Academy as number six of sixty-five in the Class of 1891. His father was a volunteer of the Ohio Volunteer Infantry during the Civil War, in which he died of illness. Horney attended primary and secondary school at Mechanicsburg, Ohio and taught in order to support his family. In 1887, he entered the Military Academy by alternative appointment from Ohio.

== Military career ==
Horney was first stationed in infantry until 1894. He then transferred to ordnance, where he remained until 1930. In 1898, Horney co-designed the M1903 Springfield while stationed at the Springfield Armory. He also modified the sea cannons of the Watervliet Arsenal which improved the firing rate of all seacoast cannons. In 1905, he was assistant to the Chief of Ordnance in Washington, D.C. He built and oversaw the first U.S. smokeless powder plant. In 1911, Horney designed and constructed a water dam on Mississippi, in which the Western Society of Engineers examined. Horney resigned on July 14, 1915, to become the technical director of Aetna Explosives Co.

Horney volunteered for service on July 25, 1917, and was Commissioned Major of the Ordnance Reserve Corps. He was later assigned to the Chief of the Supply Division, the Office of the Assistant Secretary of War, and the Estimates and Requirements Division. As a brigadier general, Horney inspected ordnance following Armistice of 11 November 1918. On June 1, 1919, Horney reverted to his permanent rank of major in the reserves. He was commissioned as a lieutenant colonel in the Regular Army Ordnance Department on June 2, 1919, and promoted to colonel on July 1, 1920. Horney was later appointed ordnance officer of the Philippine Department from 1927 to 1929.

== Later life ==
On September 30, 1930, at the age of 64, Horney retired as brigadier general and lived in San Mateo, California. He died in San Francisco on February 16, 1957. Horney is buried at San Francisco National Cemetery.

== Relations ==
Odus Creamer Horney married Kezia Bryan on July 29, 1891. They had four children together: Ruth, Grace, Esther, and Odus C. Horney Jr.
