= LeRoy Springs Lyon =

American military officer (1866–1920)

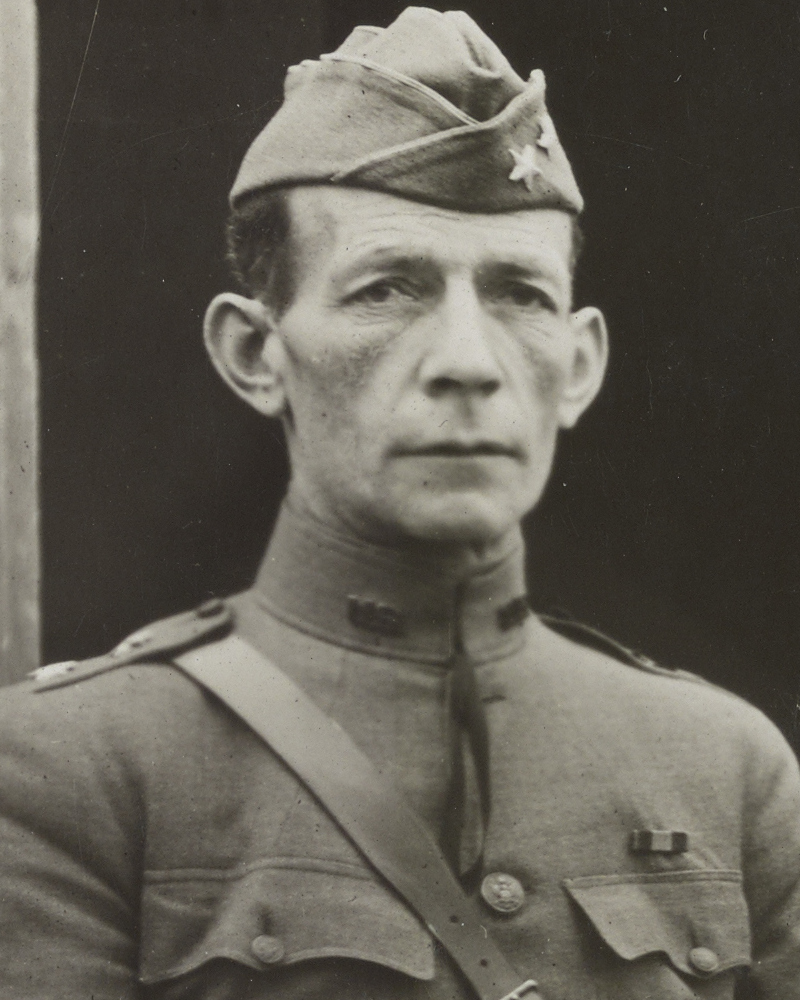
- Born: October 15, 1866; Petersburg, Virginia
- Died: February 23, 1920 (aged 53); Camp Taylor, Kentucky
- Burial place: Arlington National Cemetery
- Spouse: Harriette Amsden
- Relatives: Frank Lyon (brother)
- Military career
- Allegiance: United States of America
- Branch: United States Army
- Service years: 1891–1920
- Rank: Major General
- Commands: 65th Field Artillery Brigade; 31st Infantry Division; 90th Infantry Division, Field Artillery Basic School
- Wars: Spanish–American War, Philippine–American War, First World War
- Awards: Army Distinguished Service Medal (Posthumous)

Major General LeRoy Springs Lyon (15 October 1866 – 23 February 1920) was a United States Army officer.

== Early life ==
LeRoy Lyon was born to John Lyon and Margaret Springs Lyon on 15 October 1866, in Petersburg, Virginia. Among his siblings was Frank Lyon. LeRoy Lyon attended and graduated from Richmond College with a Bachelor of Arts in 1886. Lyon then went on to attend the U.S. Military Academy, from which he graduated seventh out of a class of sixty-five in 1891. Among his classmates were several men who would, like Lyon himself, become general officers in the future, such as Andrew Hero Jr., James F. McIndoe, John W. Heavey, John J. Bradley, Edwin B. Winans, John L. Hines, and Hanson E. Ely.

== Military career ==
Lyon was commissioned into the 7th Cavalry as a Second Lieutenant upon his graduation from the U.S. Military Academy in June 1891. Much of his brief career with the 7th Cavalry would take place along the Mexican border as the regiment pursued renegade Apache Indians. After several months in the cavalry, Lyon transferred to the artillery service in October 1891.

=== Spanish–American War ===
In 1898, Lyon graduated from the Coast Artillery School at Fort Monroe, Virginia, and was immediately appointed aide to General Royal T. Frank at Chickamauga Park, Anniston and Department of the Gulf headquarters. Lyon served as Gen. Frank's aide during much of the Spanish–American War until 1899. In 1899, Lyon was transferred to the 2nd Artillery Regiment and saw service in Cuba until 1900.

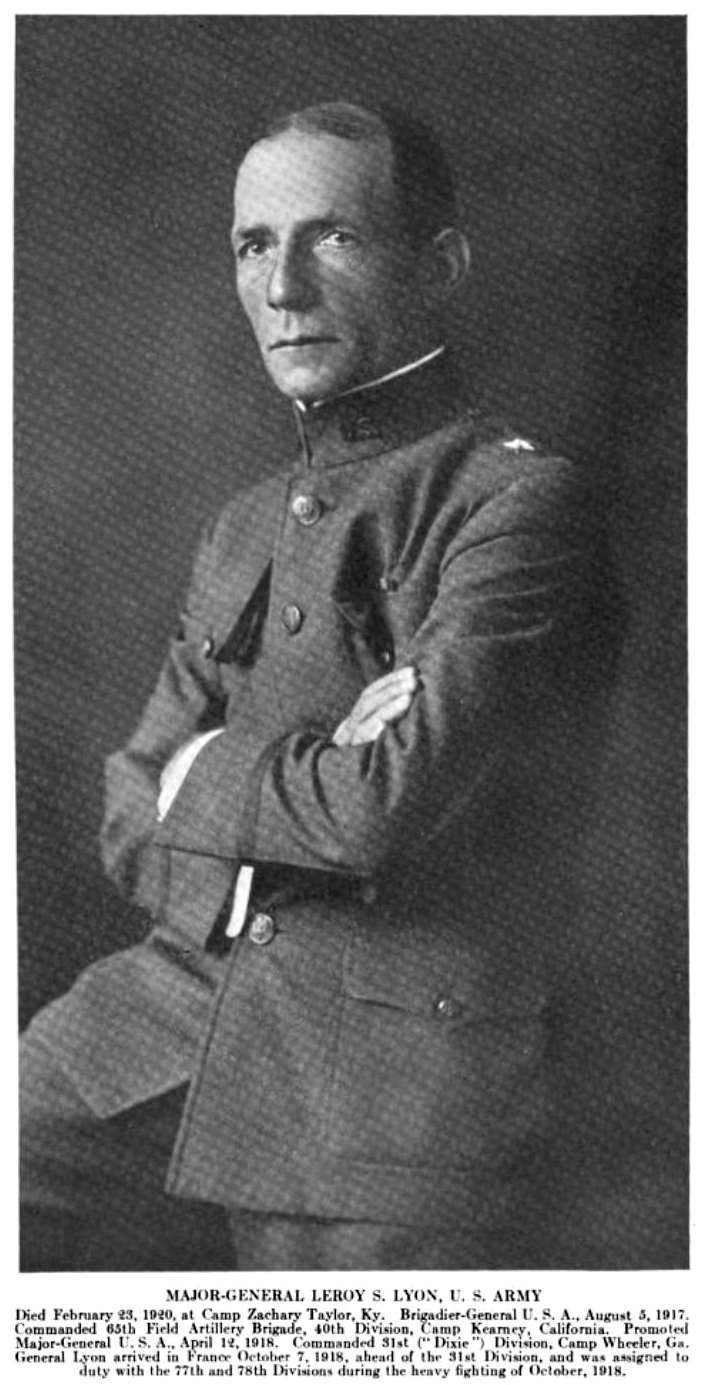
LeRoy Springs Lyon in The Artillery Journal 1921, shortly after his death.

In 1903, after graduating from the School of Submarine Defense at Fort Totten, New York, Lyon was appointed District Artillery Engineer at Fort Barrancas, Florida, position which he held until 1906. From 1906 to 1907, Lyon served in the Philippine–American War against the Moros.

Lyon served in the Panama Canal Zone from 1916 to 1917, where he was promoted to colonel in May 1915 before returning to the United States to command Camp Bowie, Texas, until May of the same year. Lyon was promoted to brigadier general in August 1917 and was given command of the 65th Field Artillery Brigade at Camp Kearny, California, in August 1917 following the U.S. entry into the First World War.

=== First World War ===
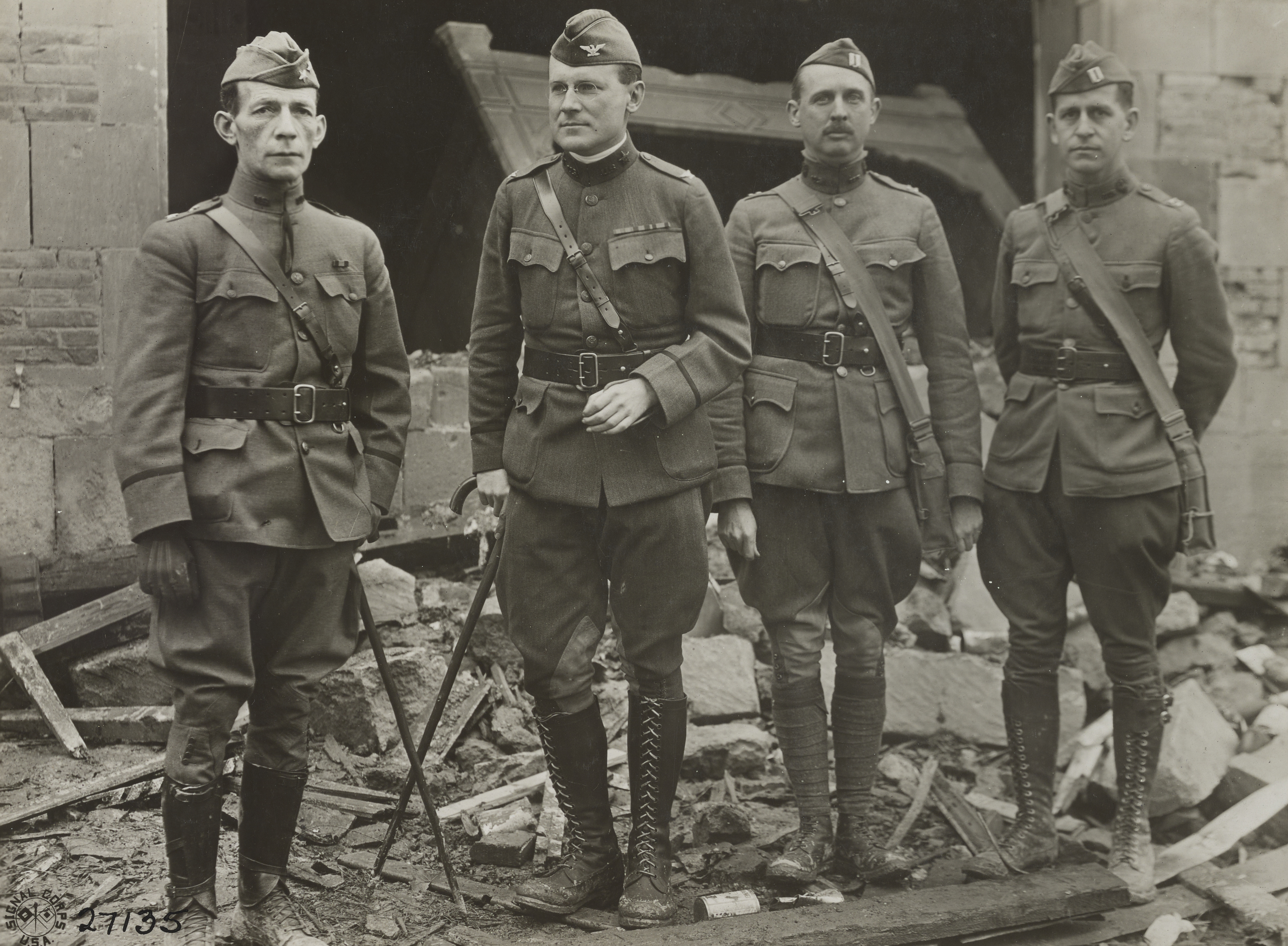
Lyon (far left), commanding 31st Division, with Colonel Kenyon A. Joyce, his chief of staff, and two aides, France, October 1918.

In May 1918, Lyon was promoted once more, this time to major general, and given command of the 31st Infantry Division. Lyon arrived in France with the 31st Infantry Division on September 29 and participated in the Meuse–Argonne offensive later that year. In November 1918, Lyon was given command of the 90th Infantry Division until December of the same year.

=== Inter-war period ===
After the First World War, Lyon returned to the United States on 13 May 1919 and was conferred the honorary degree of Doctor of Laws by Richmond College on 17 June 1919. He reverted to his pre-war rank of colonel in the Field Artillery, commanding the Field Artillery Basic School at Camp Taylor, Kentucky, where he died on 23 February 1920.

== Personal life and death ==
LeRoy Springs Lyon married Harriette Amsden (1876–1961) on 1 December 1902. He died of pernicious anemia on 23 February 23, 1920, at Camp Taylor and was buried at the Arlington National Cemetery on 26 February. He was posthumously awarded the Distinguished Service Medal for his excellent leadership of the 65th Field Artillery Brigade and the 31st Infantry Division. The citation for the medal reads:

The President of the United States of America, authorized by Act of Congress, July 9, 1918, takes pride in presenting the Army Distinguished Service Medal (Posthumously) to Major General Leroy Springs Lyon, United States Army, for exceptionally meritorious and distinguished services to the Government of the United States, in a duty of great responsibility during World War I. As Brigadier General Commanding the 65th Field Artillery Brigade, 40th Division, General Lyon displayed splendid qualities of leadership and organizing ability and by his enthusiasm and energy he developed his brigade to a high state of efficiency. Later, as Major General, Commanding the 31st Division during its training, he exhibited marked tactical judgment, and his skill and leadership were largely responsible for the success achieved in perfecting the organization and training of his Division.

His military rank was posthumously raised back to major general in June 1930.

== Bibliography ==
- Chandler, Melbourne C. Of Garryowen In Glory: The History of the 7th U.S. Cavalry, (Annandale, VA: The Turnpike Press, 1960), pp. 84–107 OCLC 2339561
- Cullum, George Washington. Biographical Register of the Officers and Graduates of the U.S. Military Academy at West Point, New York Since its Establishment in 1802: Supplement, Volume VI-A, (Saginaw, MI: Seemann & Peters, 1920), pp. 575–576
- Davis, Henry Blaine Jr. Generals in Khaki, (Raleigh, NC: Pentland Press, 1998), pp. 236 ISBN 9781571970886
- Who Was Who in American History - The Military (Chicago, IL: Marquis Who's Who, Inc., 1975) pp. 356
- Wythe, George. A History of the 90th Infantry Division, (New York, NY: 90th Division Association, 1920) OCLC 01237202
