= Palmer E. Pierce =

United States Army general

Palmer Eddy Pierce
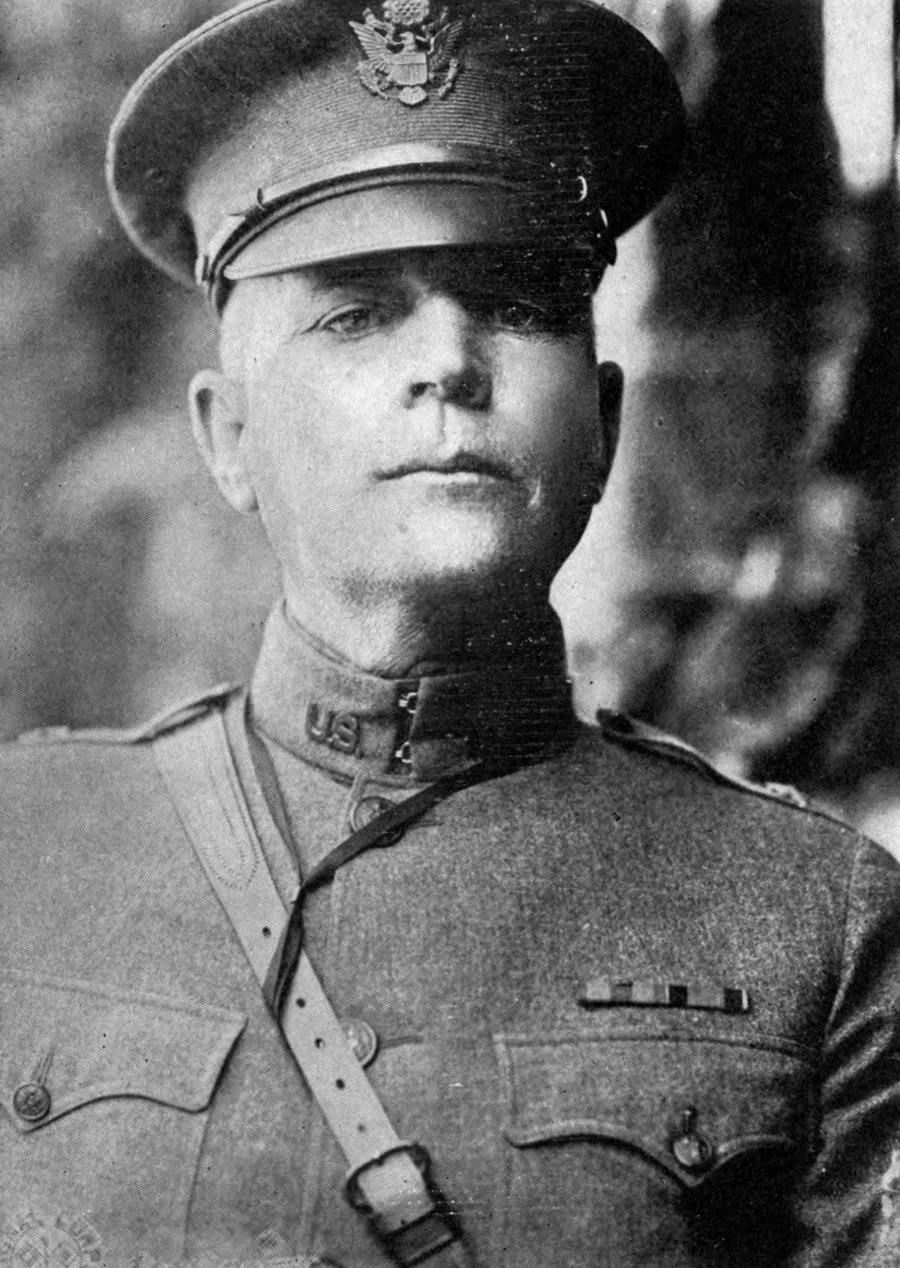
- Pierce in 1919, as the commander of the 27th Infantry Division
- Born: October 23, 1865; Savanna, Illinois, U.S.
- Died: January 17, 1940 (aged 74) New York City, New York, U.S.
- Buried: United States Military Academy Post Cemetery, West Point, New York, U.S.
- Allegiance: United States of America
- Service years: 1891–1930
- Rank: Brigadier general (at time of retirement)
- Conflicts: Spanish–American War Boxer Rebellion; Pancho Villa Expedition; World War I: Meuse-Argonne offensive
- Awards: Distinguished Service Medal (two); Order of the Bath
- Spouse: Agnes Young Pierce
- Other work: First President of NCAA; Assistant to President of the Standard Oil Company

Palmer Eddy Pierce (October 23, 1865 – January 17, 1940) was a United States Army brigadier general who commanded the 54th Infantry Regiment on the Western Front of World War I. He was the first president of the National Collegiate Athletic Association (NCAA).

== Early life and education ==
Palmer E. Pierce was born in Savanna, Illinois, to Henry C. Pierce and Laura Shepard. He was the second of three brothers. He grew up in Traer, Iowa, going on to attend Grinnell College and the US Military Academy at West Point, New York. He received his lieutenant's commission in 1891, graduating 42nd in a class of 65. He became athletic director at West Point for a short time in the early 1890s, managing the first Army football team.

== Early service ==
Pierce first served in the Spanish–American War of 1898 during the Invasion of Cuba, Puerto Rico, and the resurrection of the Philippines. He served during the Boxer Rebellion in 1899. In 1901 he graduated from the Army War College and the school of the line and the staff class at Fort Leavenworth.

Pierce was the first president of the NCAA, taking office in 1906. At the first organizational meeting in December 1905, he emphasized the importance of "home rule", which allowed any institutions that joined the NCAA to still keep their independence. He was a severe critic of the "old" rules committee, saying that they were "a self-constituted, self-perpetuating and irresponsible body, which, in order to make the rules more favorable to the playing area available at particular institutions, had degraded a once noble sport to a brutal gladitorial contest".

He served in the Villa Expedition in 1916.

== Service ==
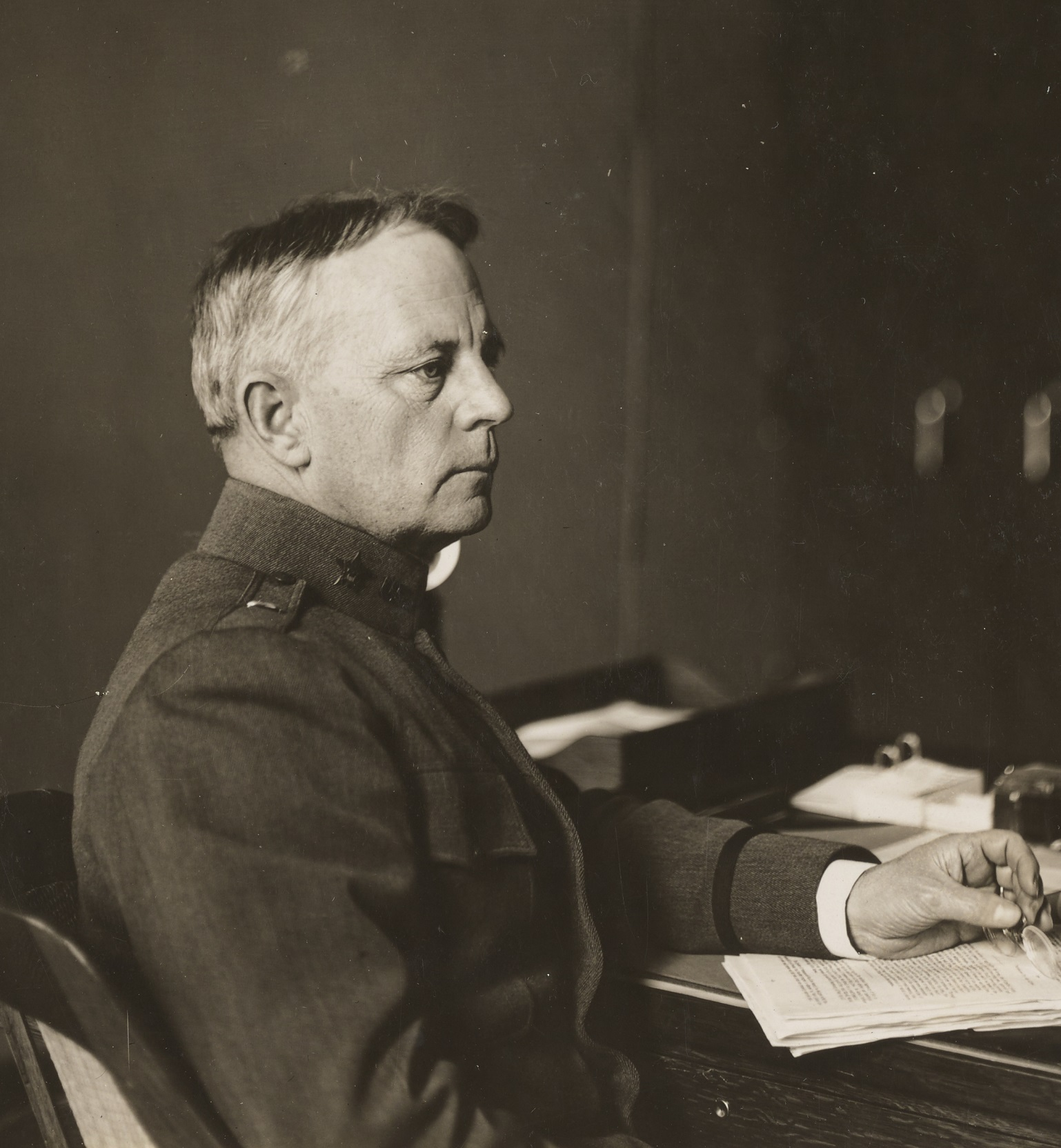
Brig. Gen. Pierce in March 1918

In 1917, Pierce became an aide to United States Secretary of War Newton D. Baker. On one occasion after the declaration of war, when Pierce appeared before the Senate Finance Committee to discuss how to spend the three billion dollars requested to send to the War Department, he declared: "Clothing, cots, camps, food, pay … And we may have to have an army in France!". "Good Lord!" said Virginian Senator Thomas S. Martin. "You're not going to send soldiers over there, are you?" Pierce became the Director of Purchases for the War Industries Board after its establishment in 1917.

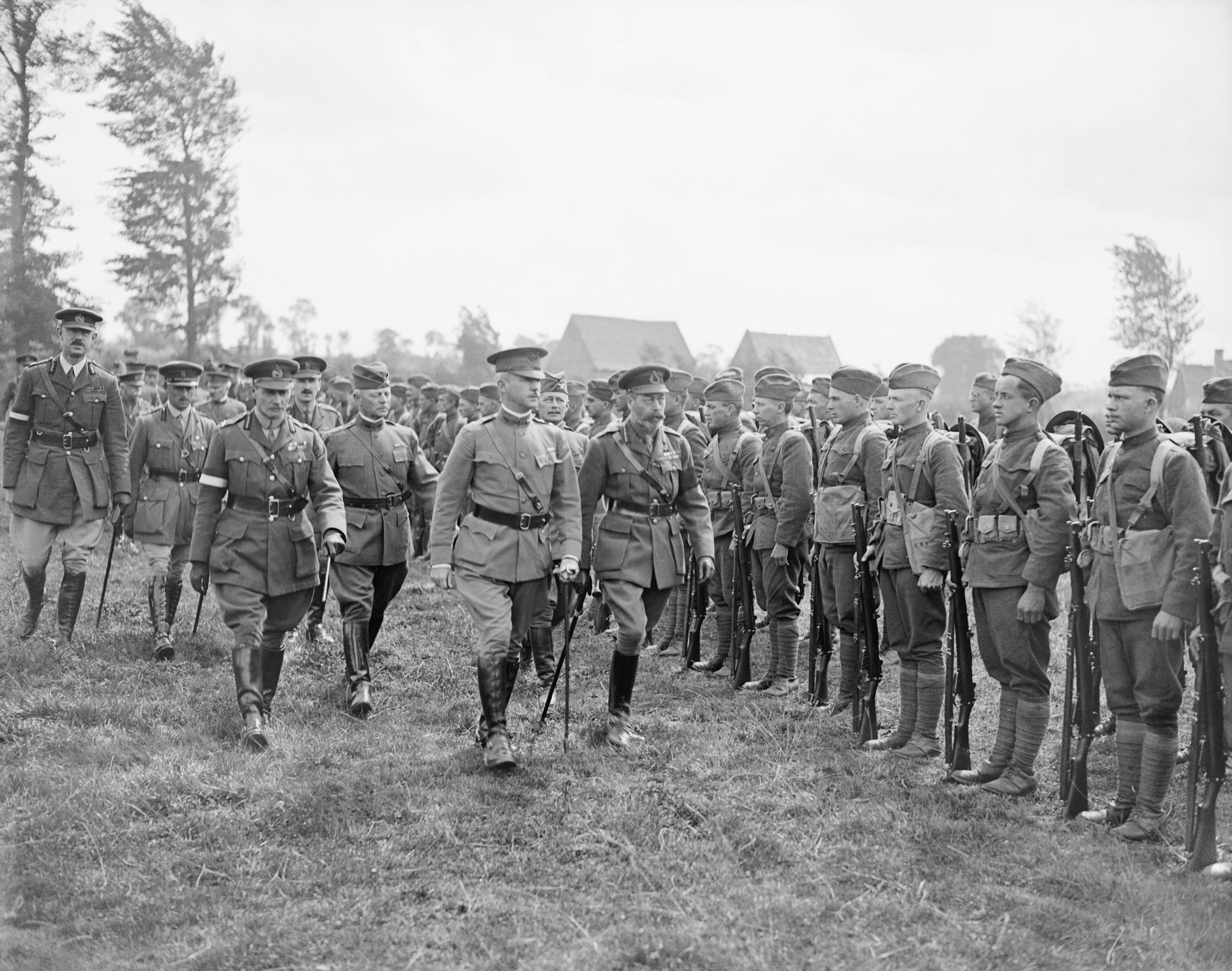
King George V inspects American soldiers of the 108th Regiment, with the 27th Division, 6 August 1918. From left to right: Brigadier General McMullen, Chief of Staff, XIX British Corps; aide-de-camp to Lieutenant General Sir Herbert Watt GOC XIX Corps; Lieutenant General Sir Herbert Watts; Brigadier General Palmer E. Pierce, commanding 54th Brigade, 27th Division; Major General John F. O'Ryan, the 27th Division commander, and King George V.

In the later half of 1917 to the early part of 1918, Pierce served as commander of the 27th Infantry Division and the 54th Infantry Brigade. While he was under British command, he was ordered to the Battle of Bellecourt; there the Australians provided invaluable supplies and lessons, including hot meals to the front lines, given the lack of supplies on the front line. In late 1918, he became the Assistant Chief of Staff of the AEF. He was promoted to brigadier general and earned two Army Distinguished Service Medal and the British Order of the Bath for his actions as the commander of the respective formations. The citation for his Army DSM reads:

The President of the United States of America, authorized by Act of Congress, July 9, 1918, takes pleasure in presenting the Army Distinguished Service Medal to Brigadier General Palmer Eddy Pierce, United States Army, for exceptionally meritorious and distinguished services to the Government of the United States, in a duty of great responsibility during World War I. General Pierce's zeal, intelligence, and effective work in the preliminary organization of our industries for war contributed substantially to the progress made. From May 1917 until March 1919, he Commanded the 54th Infantry Brigade, 27th Division, in a highly meritorious manner during all the operations of his division against the Hindenburg line. His sound judgment, marked ability, and skillful leadership were important factors in the successes attained by his division against the enemy.

== Death and legacy ==
After retiring from the Army, Pierce became an assistant to the President of the Standard Oil Company. He died in New York City on January 17, 1940.

His widow, Agnes Young Pierce (1870-1961), left a bequest of $1 million to the Association of Graduates of West Point, which was used to establish the Palmer E. Pierce Memorial Fund.

== Bibliography ==
- Blair, Dave (2011). The Battle of the Bellicourt Tunnel: Tommies, Diggers and Doughboys on the Hindenburg Line, 1918. Frontline Books. ISBN 978-1-84832-587-6.
- Causey, Edward H. (1917). "Advising Uncle Sam How to Spend $19,000,000,00". The Rotarian. 11 (3). Rotary International: 408.
- Higgs, Robert J. (1995). God in the Stadium: Sports and Religion in America. University Press of Kentucky. ISBN 0-8131-1923-5.
- Himmelberg, Robert F., ed. (1962). Antitrust and Regulation During World War I and the Republican Era, 1917–1932. New York, NY: Taylor & Francis. ISBN 0-8153-1406-X.
- Kennedy, David M. (2004). Over Here: The First World War and American Society. Oxford, UK: Oxford University Press. ISBN 0-19-517399-6.
- Nelson, David M. (1994). The Anatomy of a Game: Football, the Rules, and the Men who Made the Game. University of Delaware Press. ISBN 0-87413-455-2.
- Rinaldi, Richard A. (2004). The U.S. Army in World War I – Orders of Battle. Takoma Park, MD: Tiger Lily Publications. ISBN 0-9720296-4-8.
- Smith, Ronald A. (2003). Play-by-Play: Radio, Television, and Big-Time College Sport. JHU Press. ISBN 0-8018-7692-3.
- Whittingham, Richard (2001). Rites of Autumn: The Story of College Football. Simon & Schuster. ISBN 0-7432-2219-9.
