= 10th Infantry Division (United States, WWI) =

Former US Army unit

10th Infantry Division (WWI)
- Active: 1917-1919
- Country: United States
- Branch: National Army
- Type: Infantry
- Size: Division
- Garrison/HQ: Camp Funston, Kansas

Commanders
- Notable commanders: MG Leonard Wood

The 10th Infantry Division was a unit during World War I stationed at Camp Funston, Kansas. The division was assigned to the National Army and organized around a cadre of soldiers from the Regular Army.

== History ==
The 10th Division was organized at Camp Funston beginning in August 1918, shortly after the 89th Division completed its training and departed. Major General Leonard Wood, who had been the commander of the 89th during its organization and training, was assigned to command the 10th. He commanded from August 1918 to January 1919. Brigadier General Howard Russell Hickok was interim commander from January 7 to January 17, 1919. Wood then resumed command, and remained in charge until the division was inactivated in February. Among Wood's subordinate commanders was William J. Glasgow, who led the 20th Brigade.

The division's task organization included 20th, 41st, 69th, and 70th Infantry regiments, the 28th, 29th, and 30th Field Artillery Regiments, and several support units. It reached its peak strength of nearly 25,000 in early November and moved to Camp Mills, New York in preparation for transport to France. The 10th Division's advance detachment arrived in France on 9 November to make billeting arrangements and conduct other coordination. The Armistice of November 11, 1918 ended the war, and the advance party returned to the United States. The 10th Division returned from Camp Mills to Camp Funston for soldiers to be mustered out, and the organization was inactivated in February 1919. Some units of the 10th Division were subsequently employed to organize and field the Panama Canal Division.

== Subordinate Units ==
The 10th Division's task organization included:

- 10th Headquarters Troop
- 19th Infantry Brigade
  - 41st Infantry Regiment
  - 69th Infantry Regiment
  - 29th Machine Gun Battalion
- 20th Infantry Brigade
  - 20th Infantry Regiment
  - 70th Infantry Regiment
  - 30th Machine Gun Battalion
- 10th Field Artillery Brigade
  - 28th Field Artillery (75 mm)
  - 29th Field Artillery (75 mm)
  - 30th Field Artillery (155 mm)
  - 10th Trench Mortar Battery
- 28th Machine Gun Battalion (separate)
- 210th Engineers
- 210th Field Signal Battalion
- 10th Division Train
  - 237th, 238th, 239th, and 240th Companies and Field Hospitals

== Influenza epidemic ==
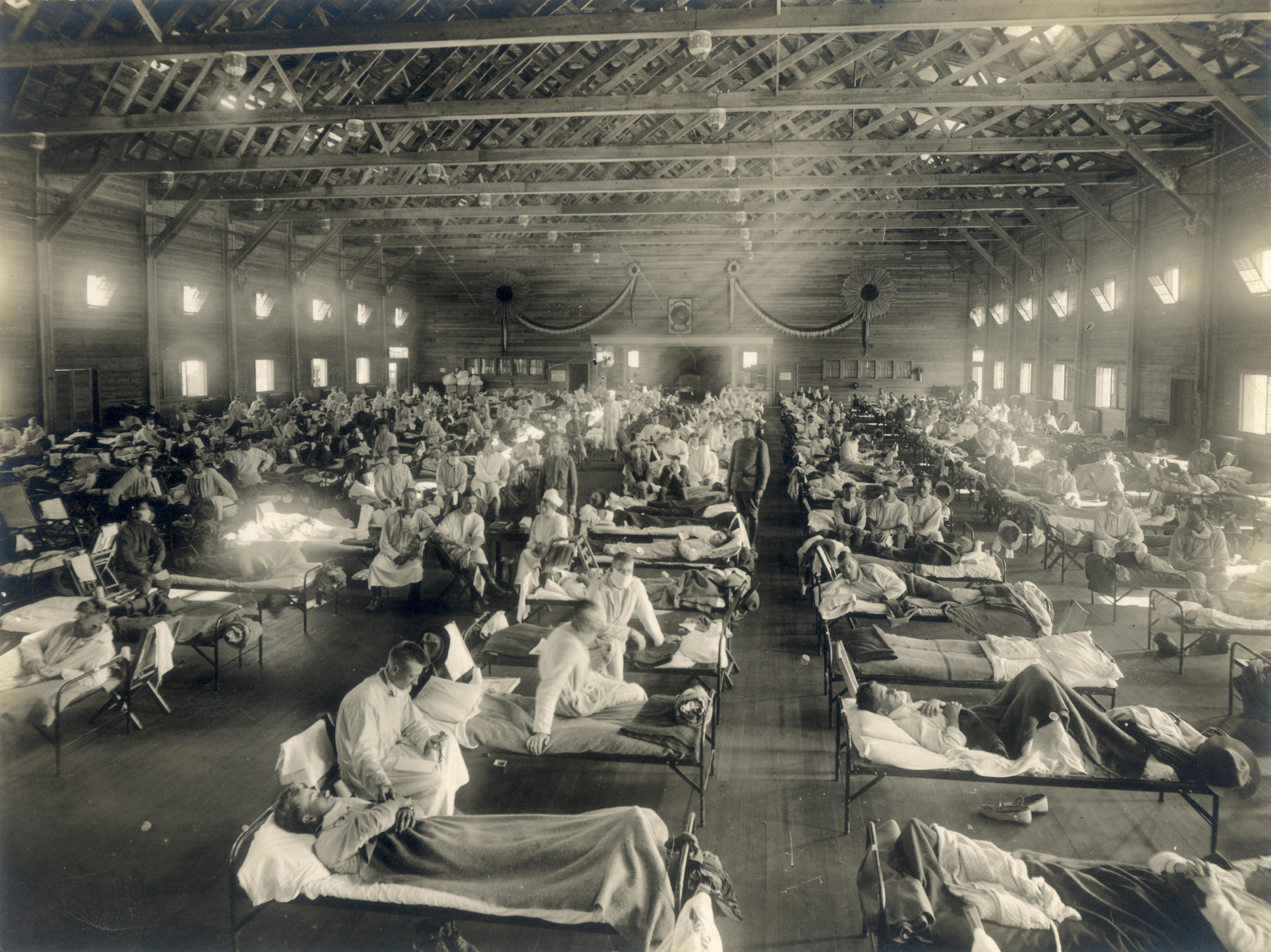
Emergency hospital during Influenza epidemic, Camp Funston, Kansas

The Influenza epidemic of 1918 began at or near Camp Funston in March 1918. The "first wave" occurred before the 10th Division was organized and the "second wave" began in September. Between September and November, nearly 17,000 soldiers based at Camp Funston were treated for influenza, and approximately 850 died.
