= 2nd Battalion, 29th Field Artillery Regiment =

- Active: 5 July 1918– 2015
- Country: United States
- Branch: Regular Army
- Part of: 4th Brigade, 1st Armored Division
- Garrison/HQ: Fort Bliss
- Nickname: "Battle Ready"
- Mottos: "Fidelis et Verus" (Faithful and True)
- Colors: Scarlet
- Equipment: M109A6 Paladin
- Engagements: World War II; Vietnam War; Operation Desert Shield; Operation Desert Storm; Operation Iraqi Freedom; Operation New Dawn; Operation Enduring Freedom
- Decorations: •Belgian Fourragere 1940 •Presidential Unit Citation, Beaches of Normandy •Cited in the Order of the Day of the Belgian Army •Presidential Unit Citation, Pleiku Province 1965 •Meritorious Unit Commendation, Vietnam 1968-1969 •Valorous Unit Award, Iraq 1991

Commanders
- Current commander: LTC Jonathon Shine
- Notable commanders: Michael R. Eastman; Thomas R. Bolen; Michael A. Crawford (Tony) Henry (Hank) Stratman (Desert Shield/Storm)

The 2nd Battalion, 29th Field Artillery Regiment (United States) is a unit of the 4th Armor Brigade Combat Team (4th ABCT) of the 1st Armored Division, United States Army. The battalion is currently garrisoned at Fort Bliss, Texas.

== Unit Structure ==
The battalion consists of two firing batteries of M109A6 Paladin 155 mm Self-Propelled Howitzers. Each firing battery consists of eight guns, eight Field Artillery Ammunition Supply Vehicles (FAASV), two Fire Direction Control (FDC) vehicles, and various support vehicles. Firing batteries are staffed with approximately 100 men, sub-divided into three platoons (1st, 2nd, and Headquarters).

The battalion also contains two non-firing batteries. The forward support company (FSC) of Palletized Loading System (PLS) resupply vehicles, fuelers, cooks, and logistics support services sections. The headquarters battery and headquarters element, collectively known as Headquarters and Headquarters Battery (HHB), consists of battalion command and staff, with supporting equipment and personnel in each of the staff sections (S1 – S6).

== Early history ==
Constituted 5 July 1918, the 28th Field Artillery, the 29th Field Artillery, and the 30th Field Artillery, became the principle artillery elements of the 10th Division. The 29th Field Artillery was demobilized 4 February 1919 at Camp Funston, Kansas, then reconstituted 24 March 1923 in the Regular Army as the 29th Field Artillery. The regiment was subsequently reassigned 1 August 1940 at Fort Benning, Georgia, as part of the 4th Division, with 2nd Battalion activating at Fort Hoyle, Maryland. The 29th Field Artillery participated with the 4th Infantry Division in the D-Day invasion at Normandy, firing over 10,000 rounds of indirect fire as the Allies advanced into the Cherbourg area. The unit inactivated 14 February 1946 at Camp Butner, North Carolina, was reactivated 15 July 1947 at Fort Ord, California, and once again deactivated 1 April 1957 at Fort Lewis, Washington and relieved from assignment from the 4th Infantry Division.

In April 1984 the battalion was reorganized under the Army's new regimental system, with 2-29 FA becoming a part of the 8th Infantry Division in Baumholder, Germany.

== Desert Storm ==
In 1991 the battalion deployed to Southwest Asia as part of the 42nd Field Artillery Brigade in support of Operation Desert Shield / Desert Storm. As a complement to air strikes in mid February, 2-29 FA shot multiple cross-border missions in the vicinity of the Wadi Al-Batin to identify and demoralize Iraqi defenders while supporting the VII Corps deception plan. During the late afternoon of 23 February 1991, the battalion's advance party entered Iraq and began preparing gun positions. The next day on 24 February 24, 2-29 FA participated as part of VII Corps Artillery in a massive artillery prep that would further soften Iraqi forces and clear the way for advancing VII Corps armored divisions. From 24 February, the battalion was assigned as reinforcing artillery for the 1st Brigade, 3rd Armored Division as it continued north into Iraq encountering small pockets of resistance and elements of two Iraqi Republican Guard Divisions (Tawakalna and Medina). Following the completion of ground combat operations the battalion (still under 1st BDE 3rd Armored Div) occupied defensive positions along the al Nasiriyah - al Basra highway. During the course of the war, 2-29 FA fired 51 missions totaling 1733 rounds while supporting the 1st Cavalry Division, 1st Infantry Division and 3rd Armored Division. After service in the Gulf War the 2-29 FA returned to Baumholder, and the 8th Infantry Division, in May 1991.

In 1994, the battalion was assigned to Fort Lewis, Washington. Finally, in 1996, 2-29 FA was deactivated as part of the Army's drawdown plan.

== Fort Bliss ==
In 2008 the 4th Brigade, 1st Cavalry Division was reflagged as the 4th Brigade Combat Team, 1st Armored Division; The 5th Battalion, 82d Field Artillery Regiment was reflagged as 2-29 Field Artillery and the battalion found its current home at Fort Bliss, Texas. Since 2008 the "Battle Ready" Battalion has deployed twice to Iraq, once in support of Operation Iraqi Freedom from May 2009 to April 2010, where they conducted security and stability operations in Maysan Province in southern Iraq, and again in support of Operation New Dawn, where they conducted stability operations in Mosul and Erbil from July 2011 to November 2011. In 2012-2013, the soldiers of 2-29 FA deployed to Afghanistan in support of Operation Enduring Freedom (OEF), where they formed several Security Forces Advise and Assist Teams (SFAAT). In this capacity the Redlegs of 2-29 FA served as combat advisors alongside the Afghan National Security Forces (ANSF) in an effort to build capacity and combat effectiveness of the Afghan National Army, Police and Border Police.
