= U.S. 69th Infantry Regiment =

U.S. 69th Infantry Regiment may refer to:

- 69th New York Infantry Regiment, 1849-present, the "Fighting 69th"
- 69th Infantry Regiment (United States), 1918-19 and 1933-44
