= Leonard Wood =

5th Chief of Staff of the United States Army

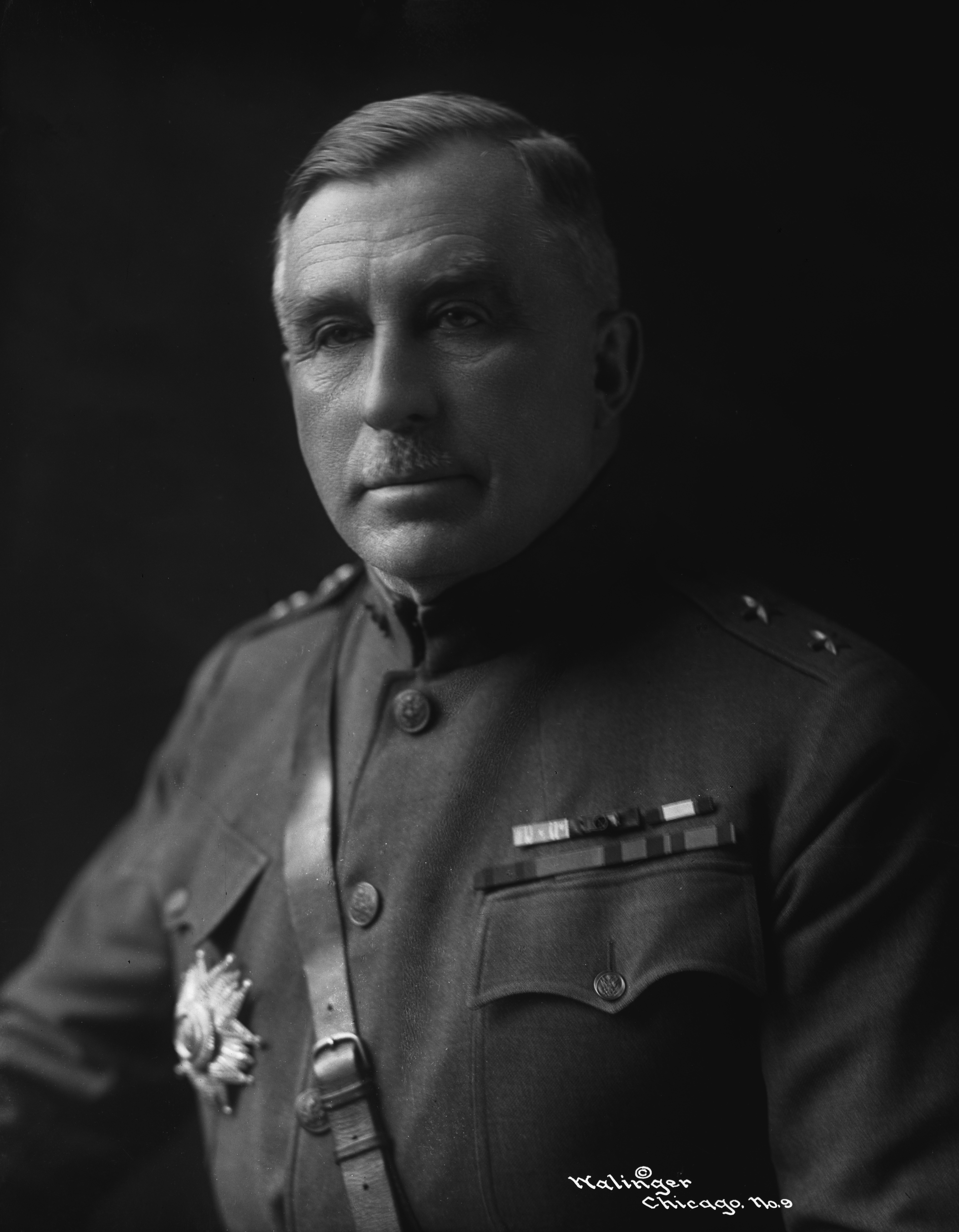
- Wood c. 1920s

Governor-General of the Philippines
- In office October 14, 1921 – August 7, 1927
- President: Warren G. Harding; Calvin Coolidge
- Preceded by: Charles Yeater (acting)
- Succeeded by: Eugene A. Gilmore (acting)

Chief of Staff of the United States Army
- In office April 22, 1910 – April 21, 1914
- Preceded by: J. Franklin Bell
- Succeeded by: William W. Wotherspoon

Governor of Moro Province
- In office July 25, 1903 – April 16, 1906
- Deputy: Tasker H. Bliss
- Preceded by: Position established
- Succeeded by: Tasker H. Bliss

Governor of Cuba
- In office December 23, 1899 – May 20, 1902
- Preceded by: John R. Brooke
- Succeeded by: Tomás Estrada Palma (President)

Personal details
- Born: October 9, 1860 Winchester, New Hampshire, U.S.
- Died: August 7, 1927 (aged 66) Boston, Massachusetts, U.S.
- Resting place: Arlington National Cemetery
- Party: Republican
- Spouse: Louise Condit Smith (m. 1890)
- Children: 3
- Military career
- Allegiance: United States
- Service: United States Army
- Service years: 1885–1921
- Rank: Major General
- Service number: 0-2
- Units: United States Army Medical Corps
- Commands: Chief of Staff of the United States Army; Sixth Corps Area; 10th Division; 89th Division; Southern Department; Department of the East; Philippines Division; 1st United States Volunteer Cavalry
- Conflicts: Apache Wars; Spanish–American War; Philippine–American War; World War I
- Awards: Medal of Honor; Army Distinguished Service Medal
- Leonard Wood's voice Gen. Leonard Wood speaks about "Americanism" (recorded 1920)

Signature
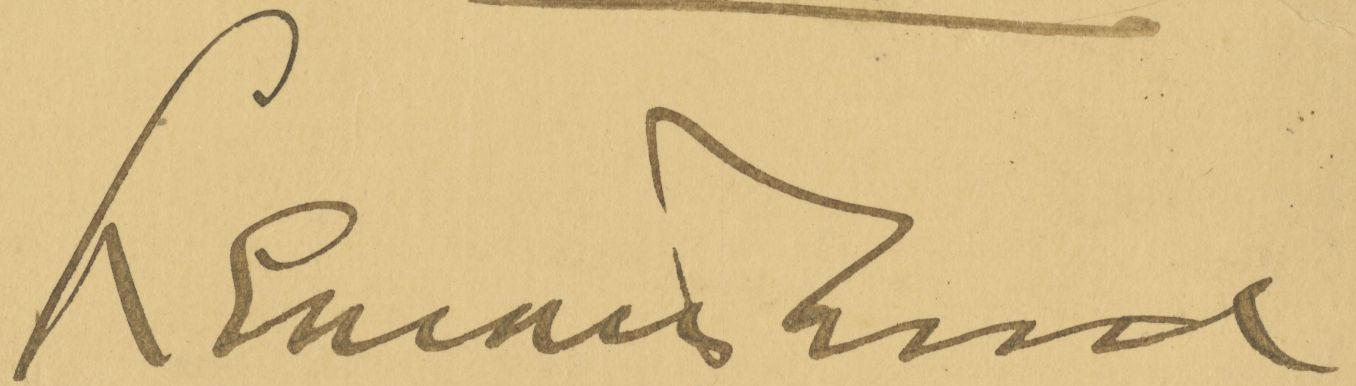
- Education: Harvard University (MD, 1884)

Leonard Wood (October 9, 1860 – August 7, 1927) was a United States Army major general, physician, and public official. He served as the Chief of Staff of the United States Army, Military Governor of Cuba, and Governor-General of the Philippines. He began his military career as an army doctor on the frontier, where he received the Medal of Honor. During the Spanish–American War, he commanded the Rough Riders, with Theodore Roosevelt as his second-in-command. Wood was bypassed for a major command in World War I, but then became a prominent Republican Party leader and a leading candidate for the 1920 presidential nomination.

Born in Winchester, New Hampshire, Wood became an army surgeon after earning a Doctor of Medicine degree from Harvard Medical School. He received the Medal of Honor for his role in the Apache Wars and became the personal physician to the President of the United States. At the outbreak of the Spanish–American War, Wood and Roosevelt organized the Rough Riders, a volunteer cavalry regiment. Wood was promoted to the rank of brigadier general during the war and fought in the Battle of San Juan Hill and other engagements. After the war, Wood served as the Military Governor of Cuba, where he instituted improvements to medical and sanitary conditions. President William Howard Taft made Wood the Army Chief of Staff in 1910, and Wood held that position until 1914. Several Republican leaders supported Wood for the role of commander of the American Expeditionary Forces in World War I, but the Woodrow Wilson administration selected John J. Pershing.

After Roosevelt's death in 1919, many of Roosevelt's former supporters backed Wood for the presidential nomination at the 1920 Republican National Convention. Wood received the most votes on the first four ballots of the convention, but the Republicans nominated Warren G. Harding. Wood retired from the army in 1921 and was appointed Governor-General of the Philippines later that year. He held that position until his death in 1927.

Biographer Jack Lane sums up his importance:

Wood played a significant role in shaping many of the United States's major developments in the early twentieth century: progressivism, expansionism and colonialism, military reform, preparedness and American intervention in World War I, and the election of 1920. He was particularly representative of an era that valued moral and physical strength. Although admired by his generation for his honesty, forthrightness, and his intense and vigorous approach to life, he fell short of greatness.

== Early life and education ==
Wood was born in Winchester, New Hampshire, on October 9, 1860, one of three children born to Dr. Charles Jewett Wood (1829–1880) and Caroline Elizabeth (Hagar) Wood (1836–1910). His family was of English descent, and Wood was descended from Mayflower passengers William White, Francis Cooke, Stephen Hopkins and Richard Warren. He served as Governor General of the Mayflower Society from 1915 to 1921. Wood was also a member of the General Society of Colonial Wars and the Sons of the Revolution. He was president of the Sons of the Revolution from 1910 to 1911.

Wood was raised in Pocasset, Massachusetts, and educated by a private tutor, then attended Pierce Academy in Middleborough, Massachusetts. Wood tried unsuccessfully for an appointment to the United States Naval Academy and considered going to sea on an Arctic expedition or as a commercial fisherman. In 1880, his sister Barbara died, followed soon after by the death of his father. Wood's mother was able to support herself and Wood's brother Jacob by taking in boarders, while Wood moved away to further his education and obtain a profession. With the assistance of a relative, Wood was introduced to wealthy businessman H. H. Hunnewell, a philanthropist who had provided college tuition for other promising young men. Hunnewell agreed to fund Wood's education at Harvard Medical School, and Wood began attending courses in October 1880. According to Hunnewell, who considered his financial support to young men attending college loans and not grants, but did not attempt to obtain repayment, Wood was the only beneficiary who ever paid him back. Wood worked diligently and consistently improved his class standing to the point where he earned a scholarship that provided additional financial support for his studies.

In 1884, Wood received his MD degree. He interned at Boston City Hospital, but was fired near the end of the year for exceeding his authority by conducting surgical procedures without supervision. He then took over the struggling Boston office of a classmate who had been hired by the Southern Pacific Railway. Wood practiced medicine in late 1884 and into the following year, but business was not steady and he did not have a reliable income. In 1885, he completed the examinations for a commission in the Army Medical Corps, attracted to the military by the possibilities for immediate employment and a regular salary. He finished second of 59 applicants, but there was only one vacancy, so Wood was not immediately offered a commission.

== Early military career ==
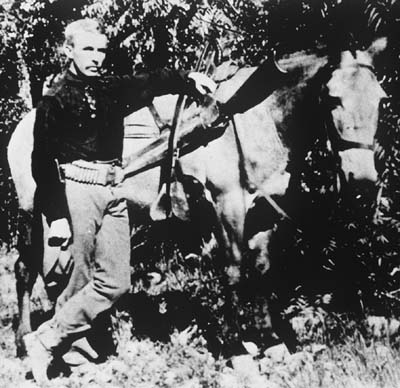
Wood as assistant surgeon at the start of his career

In June 1885, Wood was contracted by the U.S. Army to act as an assistant surgeon without rank, and he was posted to the Department of Arizona. In January 1886, Wood was nominated by the president for appointment in the U.S. Army as assistant surgeon with the rank of first lieutenant. His appointment was among several the United States Senate delayed confirming until July 27, 1886. Until that time, he continued as a contract surgeon and was stationed with the 4th Cavalry at Fort Huachuca, Arizona. Wood participated in the last campaign against Geronimo in the summer of 1886.

=== Medal of Honor action ===
In 1898, Wood received the Medal of Honor for his actions during the 1886 Geronimo campaign, including carrying dispatches 100 miles through hostile territory, and commanding a detachment of the 8th Infantry Regiment whose officers had been killed in hand-to-hand combat against the Apaches. Nelson A. Miles, the overall commander of the expedition, and Henry Ware Lawton, Wood's commander in the field, recommended Wood for a brevet promotion or a Medal of Honor, and lobbied persistently for 12 years until the medal was approved.

Citation for Medal of Honor
The President of the United States of America, in the name of Congress, takes pleasure in presenting the Medal of Honor to Assistant Surgeon Leonard Wood, United States Army, for extraordinary heroism in the Summer of 1886, in action in the Apache Campaigns in Arizona Territory. Assistant Surgeon Wood voluntarily carried dispatches through a region infested with hostile Indians, making a journey of 70 miles in one night and walking 30 miles the next day. Also for several weeks, while in close pursuit of Geronimo's band and constantly expecting an encounter, commanded a detachment of Infantry, which was then without an officer, and to the command of which he was assigned upon his own request.

Awarded for Actions During: Indian Campaigns Service: Army Unit: 4th U.S. Cavalry Date of Issue: April 8, 1898 (Note: In 1916, James Hay, a Democratic member of the United States House of Representatives, included in military legislation a provision that attempted to revoke Wood's Medal of Honor, arguing that he was ineligible as a contract surgeon at the time of the actions for which he received the medal. With Wood a possible Republican presidential candidate in 1916, the attempt to revoke his award was seen by Wood's supporters as retaliation by Hay for former Secretary of War Lindley Miller Garrison's refusal to remove Wood as Chief of Staff of the Army at the start of Democrat Woodrow Wilson's presidential administration. The bill's supporters argued they were responding to lobbying by the Medal of Honor Legion and other interested parties that advocated revoking many Medals of Honor they believed had been improperly awarded. Wood was eligible based on records showing that when he received his commission as a first lieutenant on July 27, 1886, the effective date was January 26, 1886, prior to the period of the actions for which he received the award. The countering view rested on an Adjutant General of the Army opinion that civilians were ineligible and at the time of his cited action, Wood was a civilian, so his award was not lawful. The Judge Advocate General of the Army had also previously ruled that "a medal of honor could not legally ... be awarded to a person for alleged distinguished service rendered while serving in the field as an acting assistant surgeon." In addition, Wood had received his award for distinguished service under arduous conditions, but not heroism while in actual combat, which was a requirement for eligibility. A panel headed by Nelson Miles, who had originally recommended Wood for the Medal of Honor, reviewed the disputed awards, including Wood's. In keeping with the Adjutant General and Judge Advocate General opinions, Wood's Medal of Honor could have been rescinded, as the Miles board did for 911 others, including Dr. Mary Edwards Walker and "Buffalo Bill" Cody. Instead, the panel recommended that Wood retain his award, which one historian has called a "a clear conflict of interest" on Miles' part.)

In late July 1886, Wood's appointment was confirmed and he received his commission as a first lieutenant. In February 1887, he was appointed acting captain and temporary medical director of the Department of Arizona during the illness of his superior. At the end of 1887, Wood's medical duties took him to Fort Lowell, Arizona Territory, followed by duty at Fort Selden, Fort Stanton, and Fort Wingate, New Mexico. In 1888, Wood was assigned to surgeon's duties at Fort McDowell, Arizona. In 1889, Wood was reassigned to the Presidio of San Francisco.

Wood was promoted to captain in 1891. In 1892, he was part of a contingent of Presidio soldiers that traveled to Benicia Barracks to assist units of the California National Guard during the conduct of their annual training encampment.

=== Georgia Tech football ===
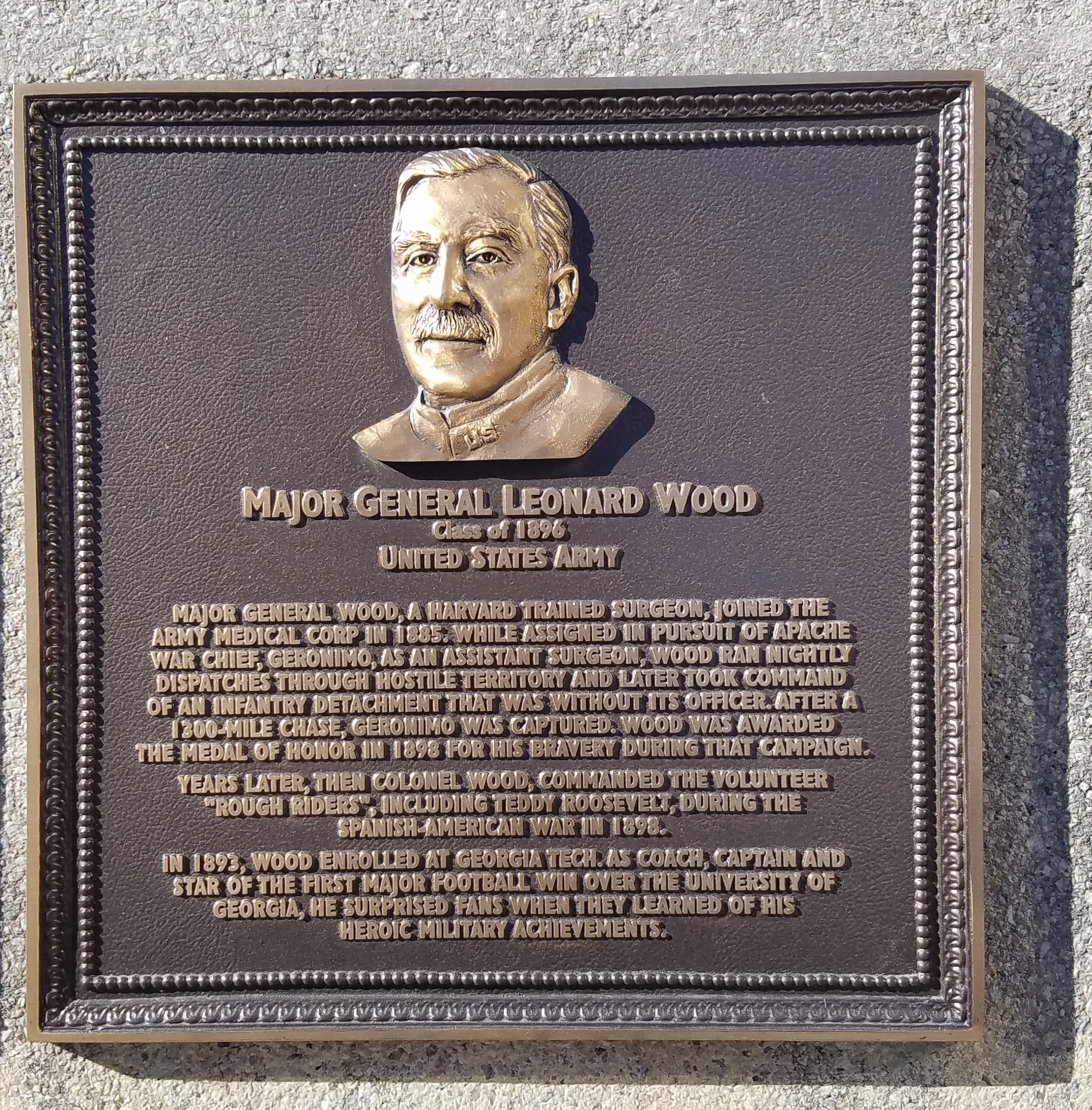
Plaque honoring Wood at the Georgia Institute of Technology

While stationed at Fort McPherson in Atlanta, Wood enrolled in graduate school at Georgia Tech in order to be eligible for the school's football team. He organized the school's 1893 team, served as coach, and played left guard. Wood led Georgia Tech to a 2–1–1 record, including a 28–6 victory over the University of Georgia.

== Spanish–American War ==
Wood was personal physician to Presidents Grover Cleveland and William McKinley through 1898. During his White House service, Wood developed a friendship with Theodore Roosevelt, then Assistant Secretary of the Navy. At the outbreak of the Spanish–American War, Wood and Roosevelt organized the 1st Volunteer Cavalry Regiment, popularly known as the Rough Riders. Wood successfully commanded the regiment during the June 24, 1898 Battle of Las Guasimas. When the brigade commander, Samuel B. M. Young, became ill, Wood received a field promotion to brigadier general of volunteers. He assumed command of 2nd Brigade, Cavalry Division, Fifth Army Corps (which included the Rough Riders) and led the brigade to a famous July 1, 1898, victory in the combined assaults on Kettle Hill and San Juan Hill that came to be known as the Battle of San Juan Heights.

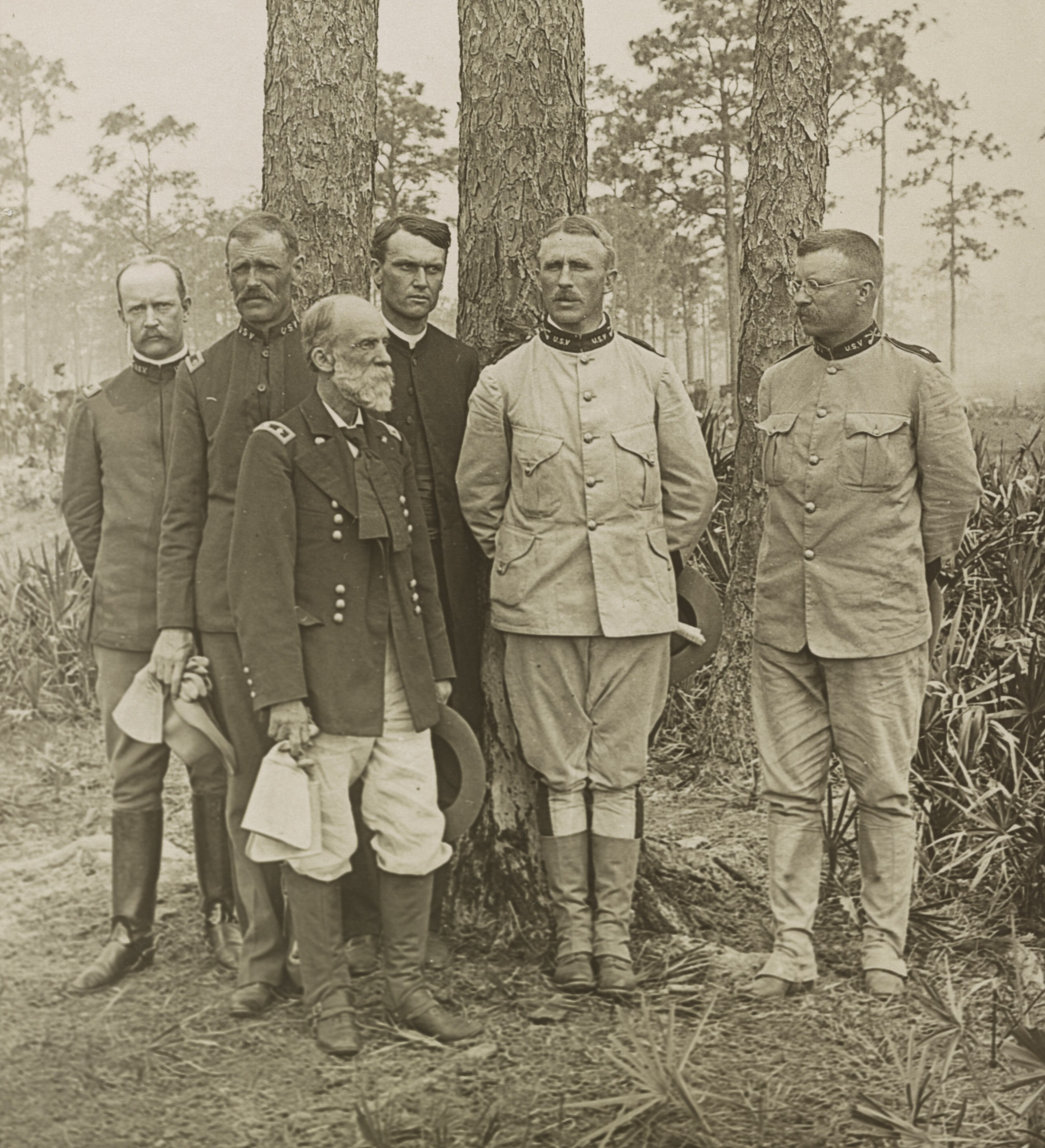
Major General Joe Wheeler with the command group of the 1st US Volunteer Cavalry Regiment – Colonel Wood is second from right with Lieutenant Colonel Roosevelt far right.

After San Juan Heights, Wood led the 2nd Cavalry Brigade for the rest of the war. He stayed in Cuba afterward and was appointed military governor of Santiago later in 1898, then served as governor of Cuba from December 1899 to May 1902. In that capacity, he relied on his medical experience to institute improvements to medical and sanitary conditions. He also introduced numerous reforms similar to those of the Progressive Movement in the U.S., including improvements to the educational and court systems. Though he did institute these improvements, Wood's motivations as military governor remain unclear. In a report to Washington in 1900, he outlined that Cuban stability would be reached when "money can be borrowed at a reasonable rate of interest and when capital is willing to invest in the island." He was promoted to brigadier general in the regular army shortly before moving to his next assignment. On May 15, 1902, prior to leaving office as military governor, Wood issued an order excluding Chinese immigrants.

== Philippine–American War ==
Wood visited several European countries in 1902. His tour included reviewing German troops during Kaiser Wilhelm II's annual parade in August, which he attended with Samuel B. M. Young and Henry C. Corbin, and a tour of the United Kingdom's Military College at Sandhurst in November. In 1903, Wood proceeded to the Philippines during the Philippine–American War, where he served as governor of Moro Province until 1906, then commanded the Philippine Division from 1906 to 1908. He was promoted to major general in 1903 despite significant opposition from members of the United States Senate who believed he had not served long enough in the lower grades and had been promoted because of political influence, not merit.

Wood received criticism for his command of U.S. Marines during the First Battle of Bud Dajo in March 1906, during which hundreds of women and children were killed. Though Wood did not directly command the assault, he took full responsibility for the resulting massacre, claiming that the high civilian casualties were the result of Moro men using women and children as human shields, as well as some Moro women dressing as men to join the fight. At Wood's instigation, Governor-General Henry Clay Ide reported that the women and children killed were the result of collateral damage from artillery fire, but that there had been no massacre. Some of Wood's critics accused him of being a "glory hound" for ordering Marines to storm the dormant volcano crater where the battle took place instead of besieging the Moro encampment.

Due to the backlash over Bud Dajo, Wood resigned as governor of Moro Province in April 1906 and was succeeded by brigadier general Tasker H. Bliss. He returned to the United States in 1908 and was assigned to command the Department of the East, with headquarters in New York City. He remained in this post until 1910, when he was appointed Army Chief of Staff.

== Army Chief of Staff ==
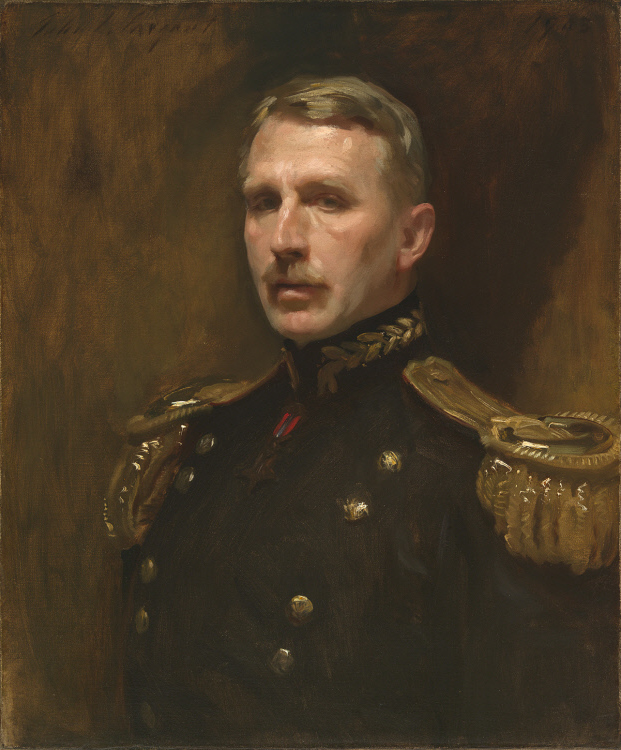
John Singer Sargent, Leonard Wood, Maverick in the Making, 1903, National Portrait Gallery

Wood was named Army Chief of Staff in 1910 by President William Howard Taft, whom he had met while both were in the Philippines; he is the only medical officer to have held the position. As Chief of Staff, Wood implemented several programs, among which were the forerunner of the Reserve Officers' Training Corps (ROTC) program, and the Preparedness Movement, a campaign for universal military training and wartime conscription. The Preparedness Movement led to implementation of the Selective Service System shortly before World War I. As chief of staff, Wood reorganized the general staff into three divisions – Mobile Army, Coast Artillery, and War College – each headed by an assistant chief of staff. The three divisions he created did not last, but the overall result of his reorganization was the recognition that decentralization, which continued under his successors, enabled streamlined planning and decision making, which facilitated operations and training as the army began to prepare for U.S. entry into the war.

== Commander of Army Eastern Department ==
In 1914, Wood completed his term as chief of staff and was succeeded by William Wallace Wotherspoon. As commander of the army's Eastern Department for the second time, Wood was a strong advocate of the Preparedness Movement, led by Republicans, which alienated him from President Woodrow Wilson, a Democrat who pursued an isolationist and pacifist foreign policy. Wood made speeches and wrote articles to advocate preparedness and in 1915 a collection of these works were published as a pro-preparedness book, The Military Obligation of Citizenship. In 1916 he was elected as an honorary member of the Rhode Island Society of the Cincinnati. He served as a member of Harvard University's board of overseers from 1917 to 1923.

== World War I ==
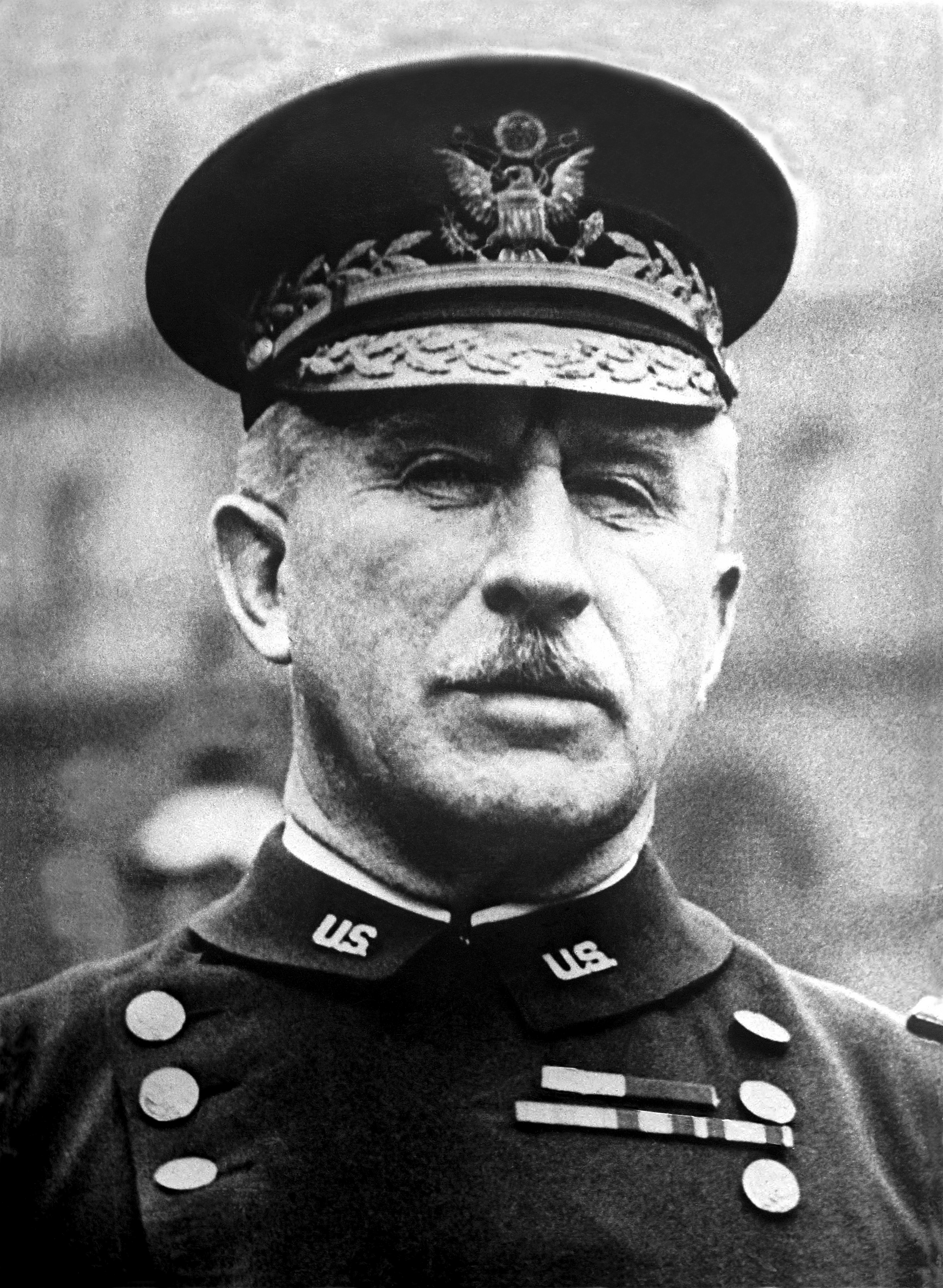
Wood c. 1919

With American entry into World War I looming in early 1917, the most likely choice to lead American forces in France appeared to be 51-year-old Major General Frederick Funston. However, Funston died of a heart attack in February, leaving President Woodrow Wilson to choose from among the army's six other major generals. Wood was recommended by several prominent Republicans, including Henry Cabot Lodge.

Despite this support, when the country entered the war in April, Wood's prior criticism of the Wilson administration led Secretary of War Newton D. Baker to recommend Major General John J. Pershing, the most junior of the serving major generals and a Republican, but one who had been less vocal than Wood.

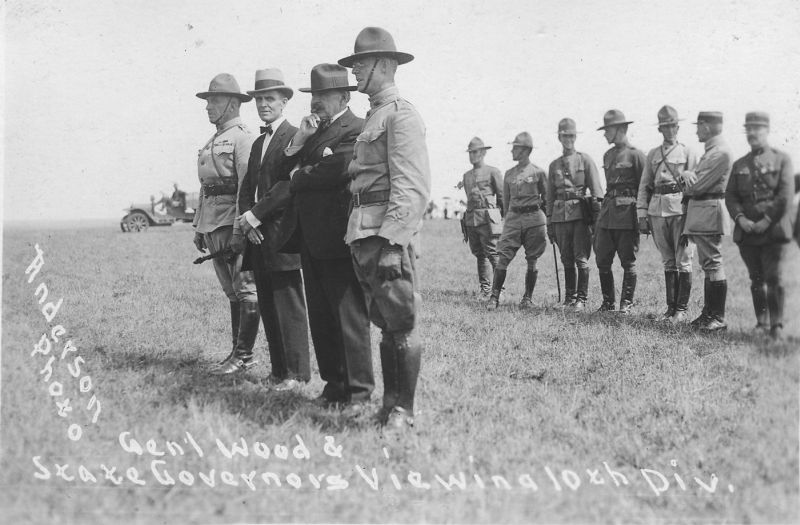
Major General Leonard Wood (left) and state governors reviewing the 10th Division, which Wood was then commanding, at Camp Funston, Kansas, pictured here in either 1918 or 1919.

During the war Wood was relegated to stateside roles, including command of the Southern Department in 1917. He then took command of the 89th Division, which he organized and trained at Camp Funston, Kansas. While on an inspection tour of the Western Front in January 1918, Wood was slightly injured by shrapnel from a mortar round that exploded during a test.

Wood was preparing to travel to France with the 89th Division in May when he was relieved of his command by President Wilson. He was disappointed at being continued in stateside service, but effectively organized and trained the 10th Division, although it never served overseas.

During most of the war, Wood's aide-de-camp was John C. H. Lee, who attained the rank of lieutenant general during World War II.

Wood received the Army Distinguished Service Medal and the Legion of Honor (Grand Officer) from France to recognize his superior service during the war. The citation for his Army DSM reads:

The President of the United States of America, authorized by Act of Congress, July 9, 1918, takes pleasure in presenting the Army Distinguished Service Medal to Major General Leonard Wood, United States Army, for exceptionally meritorious and distinguished services to the Government of the United States, in a duty of great responsibility during World War I. As a Department, Division, and Camp Commander during the war, General Wood has displayed qualities of leadership and professional attainments of a high order in the administration and training of his various commands, and has furthered in every way during the war the system of officers' training schools.

After the war, which ended due to the Armistice with Germany in November 1918, Wood was appointed to command the Sixth Corps Area, which he led from 1919 to 1921.

== 1920 presidential campaign ==
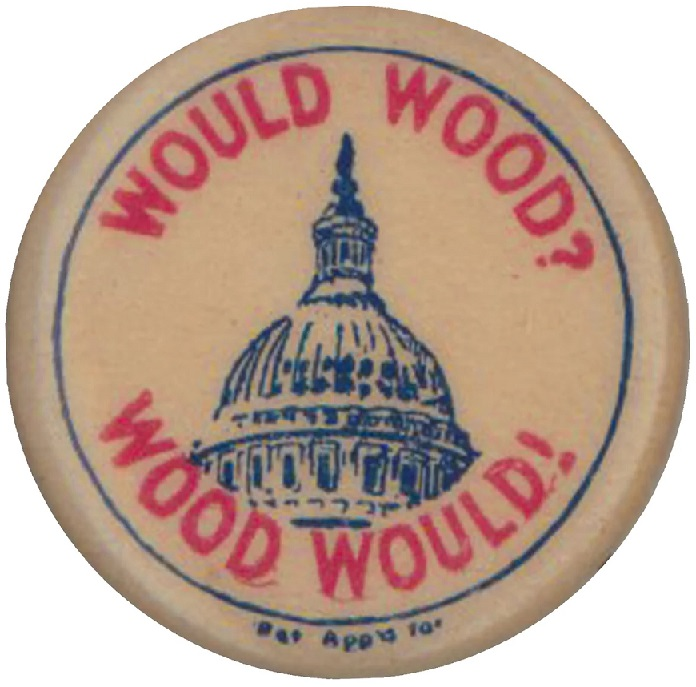
Campaign button from Wood's 1920 presidential campaign, which uses his name to make a play on words

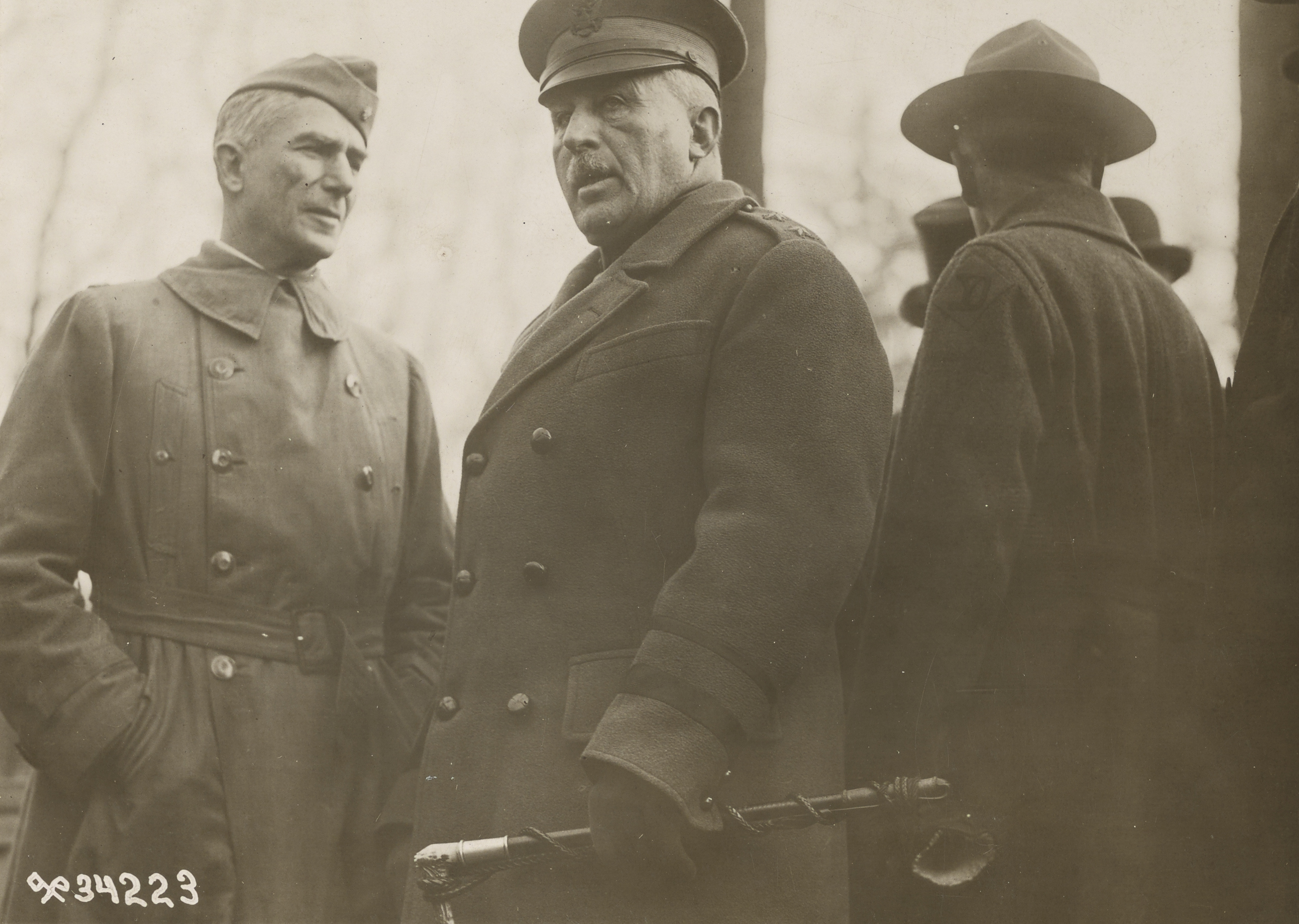
Wood at the funeral of Theodore Roosevelt, January 1919.

After having considered a presidential candidacy in 1916, in 1920 Wood was a serious contender for the Republican nomination. The major candidates were Senator Hiram Johnson of California, a progressive who opposed U.S. involvement in the League of Nations; Governor Frank Orren Lowden of Illinois, who supported women's suffrage and Prohibition, and opposed U.S. entry into the League of Nations; and Wood, whose military career made him the personification of competence and ties to Theodore Roosevelt earned him the backing of many of Roosevelt's former supporters, including William Cooper Procter. Senator Warren G. Harding of Ohio was a dark horse candidate, running as a favorite son in order to maintain his hold on Ohio's Republican Party and secure his reelection to the Senate. At the convention, Wood led on the first four ballots, was second on the fifth, tied for first with Lowden on the sixth, and led again on the seventh. With none of the three front runners able to obtain a majority, support for Harding started to grow and he won the nomination on the tenth ballot. Delegates nominated Calvin Coolidge for vice president, and the Harding-Coolidge ticket went on to win the general election.

== Governor-General of the Philippines ==
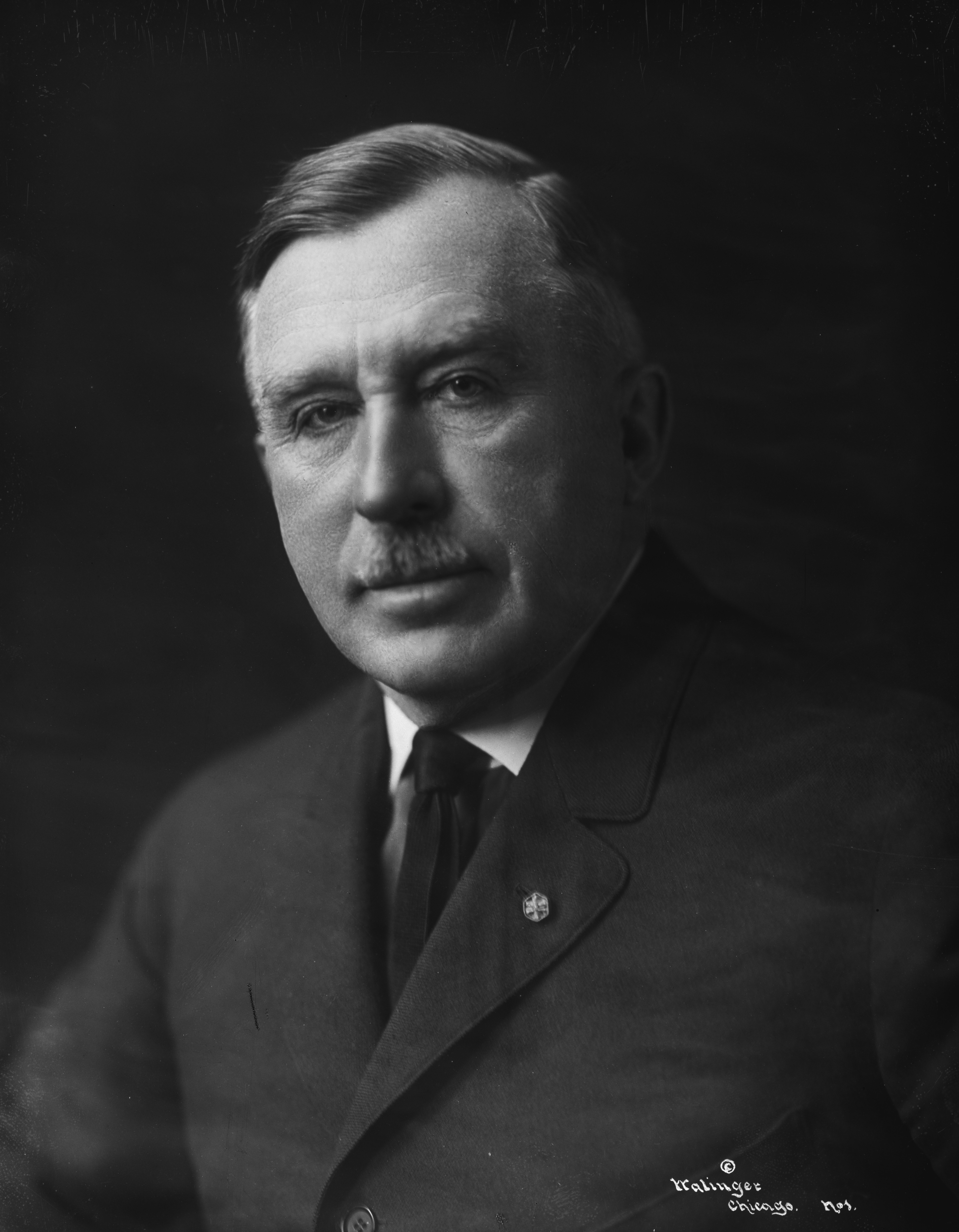
Portrait by Charles Walinger c. 1920s

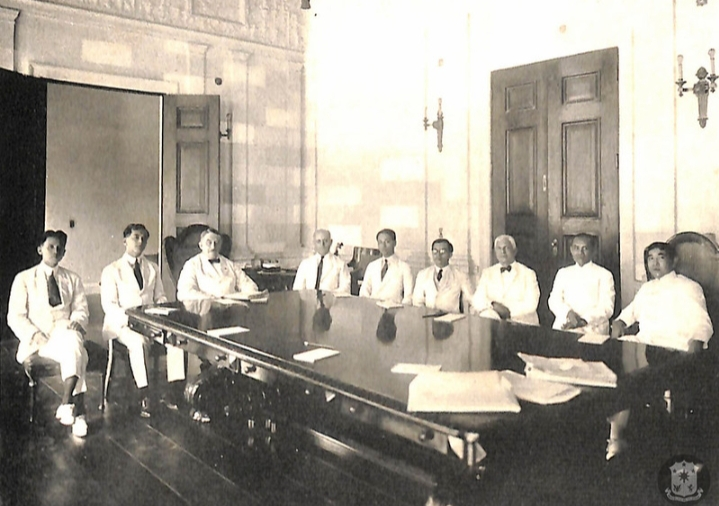
Wood with his Philippine cabinet, 1923

Wood retired from the U.S. Army in 1921, after which he was chosen to serve as provost of the University of Pennsylvania. The college granted him a leave of absence before he assumed the position, enabling him to carry out a one-year appointment as Governor General of the Philippines. The Wood-Forbes mission appointed by Harding in 1921 to consider Filipino independence concluded that the Philippines was not ready for self-governance. In 1922, Wood decided to remain in the Philippines, so he resigned the provost's position.

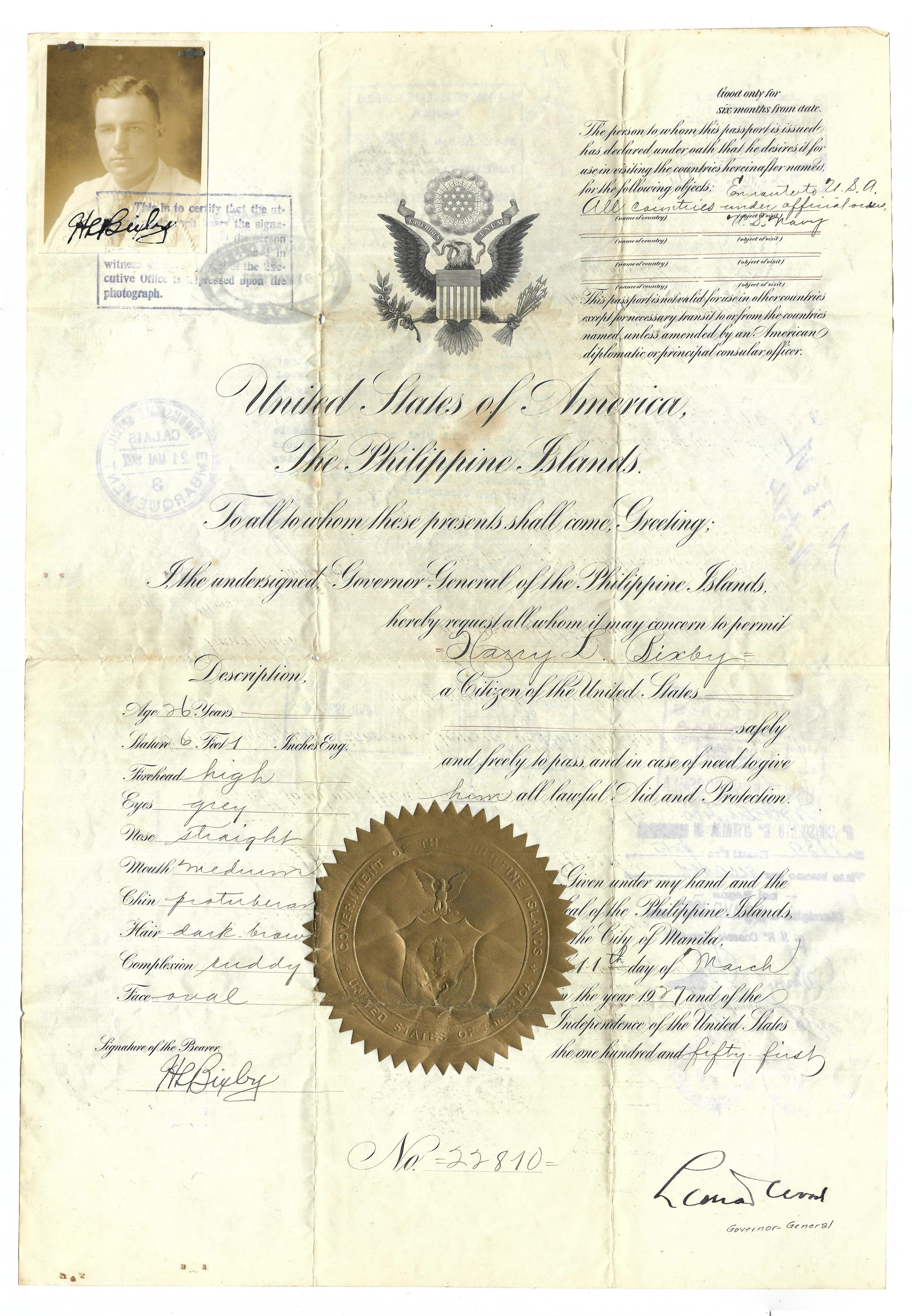
1927 Philippine Islands passport signed by Leonard Wood.

Wood's Philippines tenure was characterized by tension between him and key Filipino officials. In his first year, Wood vetoed 16 measures passed by the Philippine Legislature, an act denounced by critics as a "misuse of the veto power" when they noted that his predecessor, Francis Burton Harrison, had vetoed only five measures during his entire seven and a half year governorship. The conflict increased in 1923, precipitated by the case of Ray Conley, a Manila Police detective who was accused of immorality and official misconduct. Interior Secretary Jose P. Laurel sought Conley's removal but Wood ordered Laurel to reinstate him. Laurel then tendered his resignation. The Filipino members of Wood's cabinet, including the entire Council of State, protested Wood's action by following Laurel's example. These events, the "Cabinet Crisis of 1923", strained relations between Wood's government and Filipino leaders, which lasted until his death in 1927.

The cabinet crisis was also exacerbated by disagreement between Wood and Filipino officials over Wood's economic reform agenda following the 1921 Philippine financial crisis. Wood reiterated his opposition to independence in 1925, arguing that while most government roles were filled by Filipinos, the U.S. should keep the Philippines for its own strategic interests. As the conflict between Wood and Filipino officials continued, Wood used the Philippine Constabulary to silence criticism of his administration, with critics accusing him of effectively turning the Philippines into a "surveillance state". In another effort to control public perception of his governorship, Wood directed Rafael Crame, an experienced intelligence officer who formerly served in the constabulary's Information Department, to organize a "subtle strategy" to demoralize the islands' burgeoning nationalist movement. The Philippine Legislature tried to sabotage Wood's economic reform agenda by influencing the Board of Control, the entity that chose boards of directors for corporations in the Philippines. Wood responded by removing Senate President Manuel L. Quezon and House Speaker Manuel Roxas from the board, which resulted in Wood becoming the sole authority over all Philippine government-owned corporations. Wood also won Philippine Supreme Court approval to appoint a new Board of Control. The nine-member court was structured to give American justices a one-vote majority, and the court decided in Wood's favor by one vote.

== Death and burial ==
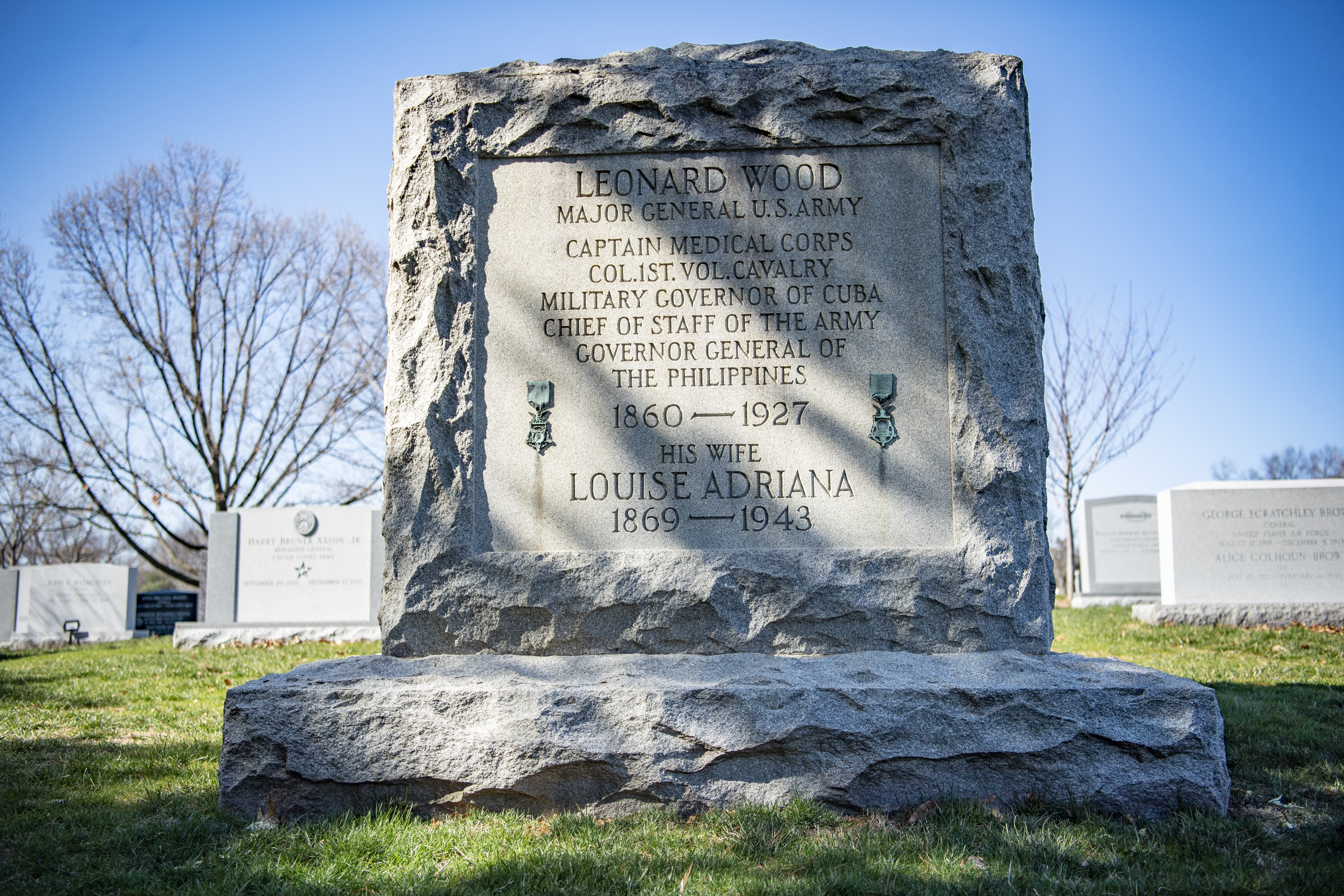
Grave at Arlington National Cemetery

Wood was diagnosed in 1910 with a benign meningioma, which was successfully resected by Harvey Cushing. He made a full recovery, but the tumor later recurred. Wood died in Boston on August 7, 1927, during surgery on the brain tumor. He was buried at Arlington National Cemetery, Section 21, Grave S-10.

The successful removal of Wood's first brain tumor represented an important milestone, indicating to the public the advances that had been made in the nascent field of neurosurgery and extending Wood's life by almost two decades. His brain is held at the Yale University School of Medicine as part of an historic collection of Harvey Cushing's patients' preserved brains.

== Family ==
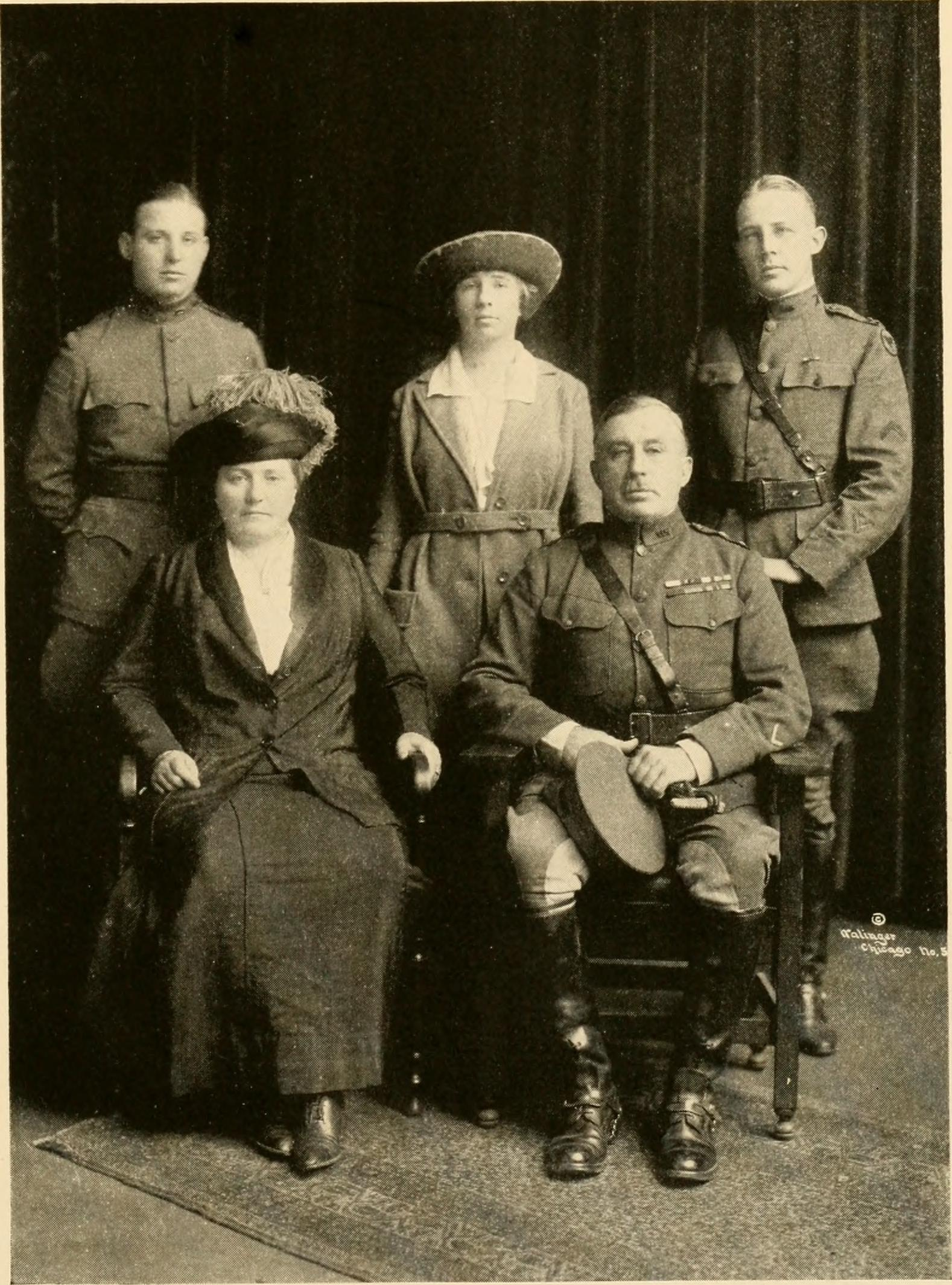
Wood with his wife and children

Wood was serving in Monterey, California, in 1888 when he met Louise Adriana Condit Smith (1869–1943), who was vacationing with her uncle and legal guardian, Supreme Court Justice Stephen Johnson Field. They married in Washington, DC on November 18, 1890, with the entire Supreme Court in attendance.

The Woods had three children:

- Leonard Wood Jr. (1892–1931) was a Cornell University graduate who attained the rank of captain while serving in the Army during World War I, but was plagued by financial difficulties and ill health afterwards.
- Osborne Cutler Wood (1897–1950) left Harvard University to serve in World War I, and attained the rank of lieutenant colonel after the war. After leaving the Army he relocated to New Mexico, where he was commissioned as a brigadier general and appointed as adjutant general of the New Mexico National Guard.
- Louise Barbara Wood (1900–1960) served with Anne Morgan's American Friends in France relief organization during World War I. Louise Wood took an interest in preserving her father's legacy. In 1952, she attended the opening of a park in Cuba which included a plaque commemorating her father's Spanish-American War service and the shack in which Walter Reed conducted the research that proved mosquitoes are the cause of malaria.

== Legacy ==
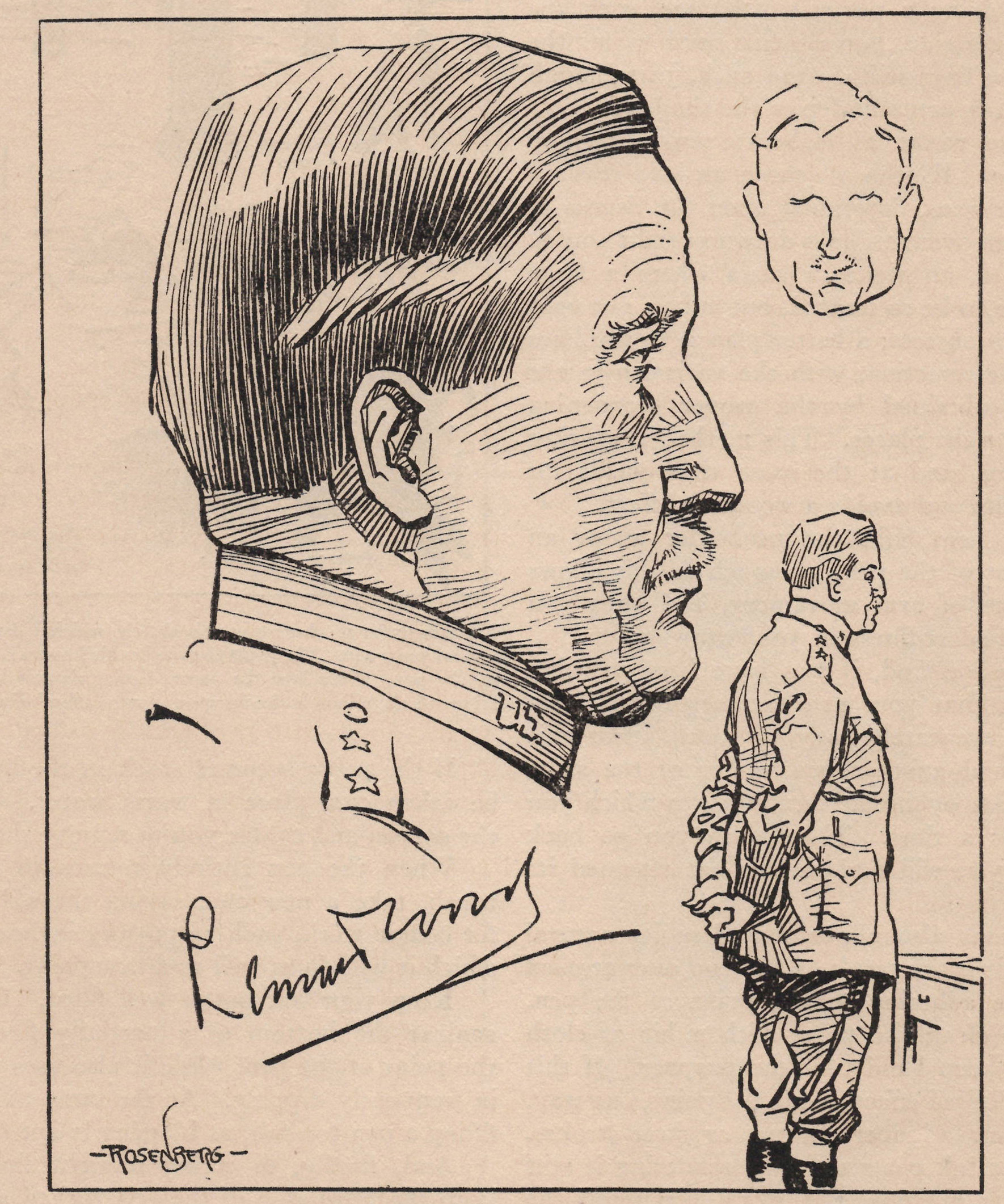
Signed drawing by Manuel Rosenberg, 1927

In 1925, Dorothy Wade, wife of the head doctor at the Culion leper colony, and fundraiser Perry Burgess created a charitable committee that after Wood's death became the Leonard Wood Memorial for the Eradication of Leprosy. The Wood Memorial supported leper colonies in Culion and Cebu, held the first international conference on leprosy in Manila in 1931, and helped support the International Leprosy Foundation. A statue of Wood was erected at Culion in 1931.

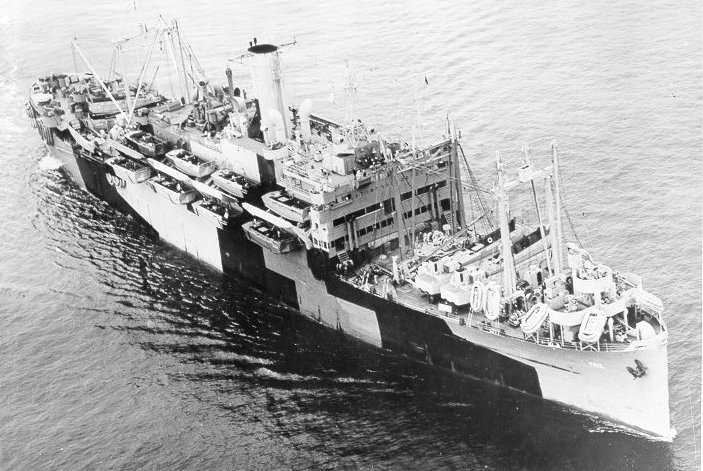
USS Leonard Wood underway off coast of California, April 28, 1944

In January 1941, the newly constructed Seventh Corps Area Training Center in Missouri was designated Fort Leonard Wood.

One of the U.S. Navy's World War II-era Harris-class attack transports, USS Leonard Wood (APA-12), was named for Wood.

Lake Wood near Mount Imbing in the province of Zamboanga del Sur in Mindanao is named for Wood.

Numerous streets are named after Wood, including roads in Baguio and Zamboanga City, Philippines. An elementary school in Mandaue, Philippines (inside the Eversley Childs Sanitarium compound) was also named after him. There are streets named for Wood at current and former military posts, including Fort Meade, Maryland and Sheridan Reserve Center (formerly Fort Sheridan), Illinois.

Wood was a Freemason; Leonard Wood Lodge No. 105 under the Most Worshipful Grand Lodge of Free and Accepted Masons of the Philippines was named in his honor.

== In popular culture ==
- Lee Philips was cast as Lieutenant Wood in the 1960 episode, "The White Healer", of the syndicated television anthology series, Death Valley Days.
- Wood is portrayed by Dale Dye in the 1997 Rough Riders miniseries.
- Iain Glen portrayed Leonard Wood in the TBA Studios film Quezon (2025). The movie delved into his role as Governor-General of the Philippines during Manuel L. Quezon's fight for the country's independence.

== Honors ==
=== Honorary degrees ===
Wood received honorary degrees from many institutions of higher learning, including:

- Harvard University (Doctor of Laws, LL.D., 1899)
- Williams College (LL.D., 1902)
- University of Pennsylvania (LL.D., 1903)
- Pennsylvania Military College (Doctor of Military Science, 1913)
- Norwich University (Master of Military Science, 1916)
- Princeton University (LL.D., 1916)
- University of Georgia (LL.D., 1917)
- University of the South (Doctor of Civil Law, 1917)
- University of Michigan (LL.D., 1918)
- Union College (LL.D., 1919)
- George Washington University (LL.D., 1919)
- Wesleyan University (LL.D., 1919)
- Lincoln Memorial University (LL.D., 1919)
- Rensselaer Polytechnic Institute (Doctor of Science, 1920)
- University of the Philippines (LL.D., 1922)

=== Civilian awards ===
Wood received the Theodore Roosevelt Association's Theodore Roosevelt Distinguished Service Medal in 1923.

=== Military decorations and medals ===
- Medal of Honor
- Distinguished Service Medal
- Indian Campaign Medal
- Spanish Campaign Medal (Note: The Spanish Campaign Medal was awarded to military members who served in Cuba, Puerto Rico, and the Philippines between May 11 and August 16, 1898. Wood was eligible for his service in Cuba during the summer of 1898, including July's Battle of San Juan Hill.)
- Army of Cuban Occupation Medal (first recipient)
- Philippine Campaign Medal (Note: The Philippine Campaign Medal was awarded for qualifying service between February 4, 1899 and December 31, 1913. Wood was eligible for his service in the Philippines between 1903 and 1908.)
- World War I Victory Medal (Note: The World War I Victory Medal was awarded for qualifying service between April 6, 1917, and April 1, 1920. Wood was eligible for his Army service in that period, including command of two divisions during their organization and training and an inspection tour of the Western Front in 1918.)
- Grand Officer of the Legion of Honor (France)
- Order of the Rising Sun (Japan)
- Order of Saints Maurice and Lazarus (Italy)
- Order of the Precious Brilliant Golden Grain (China)

== Dates of rank ==
Insignia	Rank	Date	Component
	Assistant surgeon	5 January 1886	Regular Army
	Surgeon	5 January 1891	Regular Army
	Colonel	8 May 1898	Volunteers
	Brigadier general	8 July 1898	Volunteers
	Major general	7 December 1898	Volunteers
	Brigadier general	13 April 1899	Volunteers
	Major general	5 December 1899	Volunteers
	Brigadier general	1 June 1901	Regular Army
	Major general	8 August 1903	Regular Army
	Major general	15 October 1921	Retired list

== Head coaching record ==
Year	Team	Overall	Conference	Standing	Bowl/playoffs
Georgia Tech (Independent) (1893)
1893	Georgia Tech	2–1–1			
Georgia Tech:		2–1–1			
Total:		2–1–1			

== See also ==
- Adventurers' Club of New York
- List of Medal of Honor recipients
- List of Medal of Honor recipients for the Indian Wars § W
- List of members of the American Legion
- List of people on the cover of Time magazine (1920s) – 19 April 1926

== Additional sources ==
- Bacevich, A. J. Diplomat in Khaki: Major General Frank Ross McCoy and American Foreign Policy, 1898–1949 (1989), biography of Wood's principal aide.

Political offices
Preceded by John R. Brooke	Governor-General of Cuba; 1899–1902	Succeeded by Tomás Estrada Palma as President of Cuba
Preceded by Charles Yeater	Governor-General of the Philippines; 1921–1927	Succeeded by Eugene A. Gilmore
Military offices
Preceded by Franklin Bell	Chief of Staff of the United States Army; 1910–1914	Succeeded by William W. Wotherspoon
Preceded by Newly activated organization	Commanding General 89th Division; 1917−1918	Succeeded by Frank L. Winn
