= 70th Infantry Regiment (United States) =

- Active: 1918-1919
- Country: United States
- Branch: United States Army
- Role: Infantry
- Size: Regiment

The 70th Infantry Regiment was a Regular Army infantry regiment in the United States Army.

It was constituted 9 July 1918 in the Regular Army as the 70th Infantry. Assigned to the 10th Infantry Division. Organized 10 August 1918 at Camp Funston, Kansas. from personnel of the 20th Infantry. Relieved from the 10th Division and demobilized 13 February 1919 at Camp Funston.
