= William Wallace Wotherspoon =

6th Chief of Staff of the United States Army

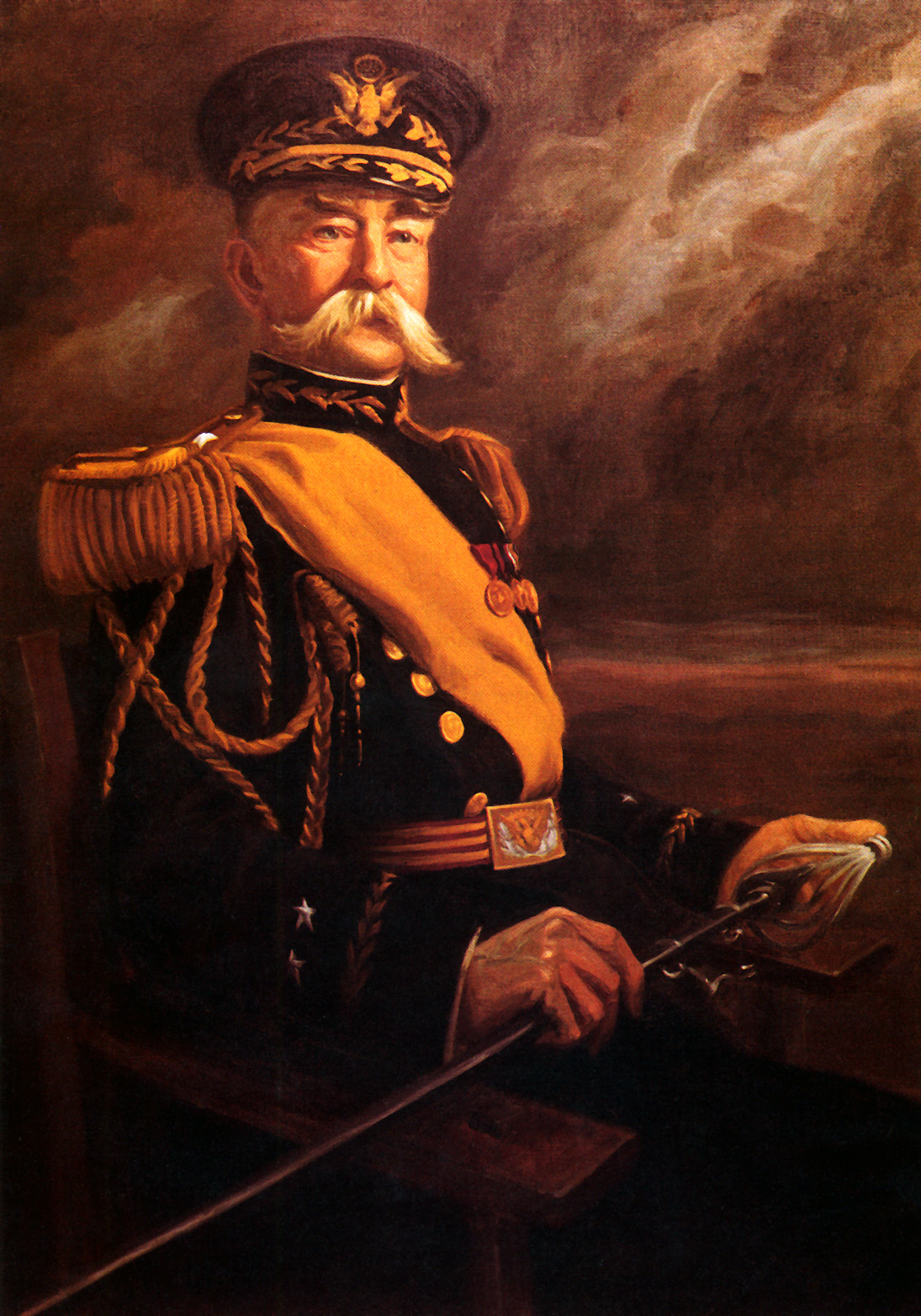
- General William Wallace Wotherspoon, official portrait by Thomas W. Orlando.
- Born: November 16, 1850; Washington, D.C., U.S.
- Died: October 21, 1921 (aged 70); Washington, D.C., U.S.
- Burial place: Arlington National Cemetery
- Military career
- Allegiance: United States
- Branch: United States Navy; United States Army
- Service years: 1870–1914
- Rank: Major General
- Commands: Chief of Staff of the United States Army (1914); Department of the Gulf (1912); U.S. Army War College (1907–09, 1910–12); 2nd Battalion, 6th Infantry Regiment (1901–02)
- Conflicts: Indian Wars; Spanish–American War; Philippine–American War
- Other work: Superintendent of Public Works, State of New York (1915–20)

William Wallace Wotherspoon (November 16, 1850 – October 21, 1921) was a United States Army general who served as Chief of Staff of the United States Army in 1914.

== Early life ==
Wotherspoon was born in Washington, D.C., on November 16, 1850, the son of Army surgeon Alexander Summerville Wotherspoon (1817–1884) and Louisa Kuhn Wotherspoon. Alexander Wotherspoon was a veteran of the Mexican War; in addition to serving on Winfield Scott's staff, he was present when President Zachary Taylor became ill in 1850, and treated Taylor during his final illness.

William Wotherspoon was educated in private schools and served as a mate in the United States Navy from March 9, 1870 to October 9, 1873 aboard the screw sloop of war USS Plymouth and the paddle steamer USS Tallapoosa. He resigned from the Navy to accept a commission in the U.S. Army.

== Army career ==
Wotherspoon was commissioned a second lieutenant and assigned to the 12th Infantry in October 1873. From 1874 to 1881, he served in the West during the Indian wars as a troop officer and quartermaster.

After a year of absence from the Army for being sick, he became the superintendent and did much needed work to expand the Soldiers' Home in Washington, D.C. He then served at Fort Sully and at Mount Vernon Barracks, where he trained a company of Apache prisoners from 1890 to 1894. In 1893 he became an hereditary member of the Aztec Club of 1847.

In 1894, he became aide to General Oliver O. Howard, commander of the Department of the East, and was the Rhode Island College of Agriculture and Mechanic Arts (today named the University of Rhode Island) first Professor Military Science and Tactics from 1894 to 1898.

=== Spanish–American War ===
In 1898, while on recruiting duty at Fort McPherson, he organized the 3rd Battalion, 12th Infantry. He served in the Philippines against insurgents and as collector of customs at Iloilo from 1899 to 1901 under the command of Colonel Edmund Rice.

=== Senior command ===
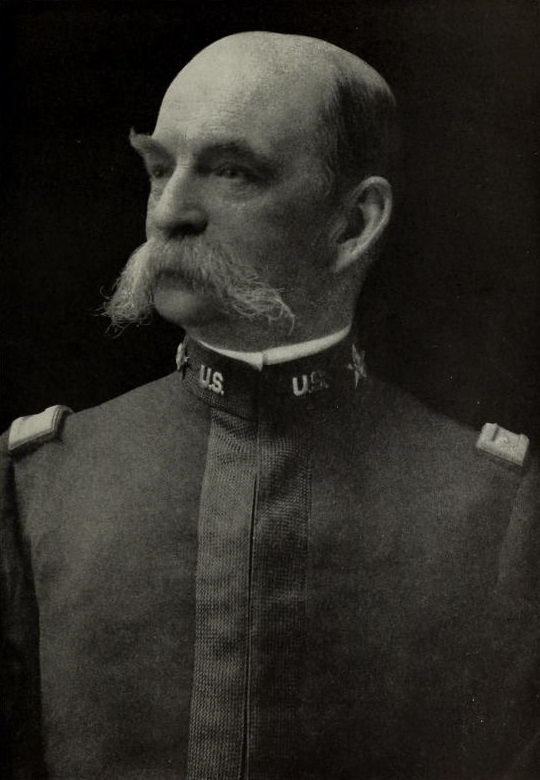
Portrait of William Wallace Wotherspoon

In 1901, he was promoted to major and transferred to the 30th Infantry. He commanded the 2nd Battalion, 6th Infantry at Fort Leavenworth and then taught at the Command and General Staff College from 1902 to 1904. He was promoted to lieutenant colonel and assigned to the 14th Infantry in 1904 and later was transferred to the 19th Infantry and became the director of the U.S. Army War College from 1904 to 1906. Wotherspoon was the chief of staff of the Army of Cuban Pacification from 1906 to 1907.

Wotherspoon served as the acting president of the Army War College and chief of the Third Division, General Staff in 1907. He was promoted to brigadier general in October 1907, advanced over 140 officers with more seniority. He was president of the Army War College, serving from 1907 to 1909 and again from 1910 to 1912. Wotherspoon was largely instrumental in transforming the Army War College from an adjunct of the General Staff to an autonomous educational institution, he became assistant to the chief of staff from 1901 to 1910 and again in 1912 to 1914. He was promoted to major general in May 1912 and served as the commander of the Department of the Gulf until that September.

=== Army Chief of Staff ===
Wotherspoon became the Chief of Staff of the United States Army in 1914; he served from April 21 to November 15. During his term, he highlighted the shortage of experienced officers and noncommissioned as the Army began to prepare for possible involvement in World War I. He also emphasized the need to improve coastal defenses to match battleships that were increasing in size and armament, oversaw establishment of the Army's first aviation section as a branch of the Signal Corps, and completion of the Panama Canal and its opening to ship traffic.

== Retirement ==
Wotherspoon retired upon reaching the mandatory retirement age of 64 on November 16, 1914 After retiring, he was New York State Superintendent of Public Works from 1915 to 1920.

Wotherspoon died in Washington, D.C. on October 21, 1921. He was buried with full military honors at Arlington National Cemetery, Section 3, Site 1949.

In 1893 Wotherspoon became a representative member of the Aztec Club of 1847 by right of his father's service in the Mexican War.

== Family ==
In 1887, while stationed in northern New York, he married Mary C. Adams (1865–1953) of Utica, New York. They were the parents of a son, Alexander Somerville Wotherspoon (1892–1976). Alexander Wotherspoon was a career officer in the United States Navy, and retired as a rear admiral.

== Military awards ==
- Indian Campaign Medal
- Spanish War Service Medal
- Philippine Campaign Medal

== Dates of rank ==
Insignia	Rank	Date	Component
	Second Lieutenant	1 October 1873	Regular Army
	First Lieutenant	20 March 1879	Regular Army
	Captain	28 April 1893	Regular Army
	Major	2 February 1901	Regular Army
	Lieutenant Colonel	12 July 1904	Regular Army
	Brigadier General	3 October 1907	Regular Army
	Major General	12 May 1912	Regular Army

== Notes ==
Military offices
Preceded by Leonard Wood	Chief of Staff of the United States Army; 1914	Succeeded by Hugh L. Scott
