= 29th Field Artillery Regiment =

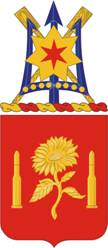
- Coat of arms
- Active: 1918
- Country: United States
- Branch: Army
- Type: Field artillery
- Motto(s): Fidelis et Versus (Faithful and True)
- Engagements: World War II; Vietnam War; Operation Enduring Freedom; Operation Iraqi Freedom

Insignia
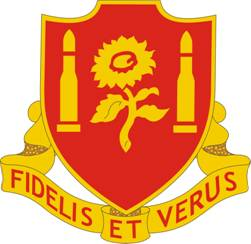
- Distinctive unit insignia

The 29th Field Artillery Regiment is a field artillery regiment of the United States Army, first constituted in 1918 in the National Army (USA).

== History ==
The Regiment's Battery G was one of the last two combat units to serve in the Vietnam War. On 11 August 1972 it and the 3rd Battalion, 21st Infantry Regiment were stood down.

== Lineage ==
Constituted 5 July 1918, the 28th Field Artillery, the 29th Field Artillery, and the 30th Field Artillery, became the principle artillery elements of the 10th Division.

- The 29th Field Artillery was demobilized 4 February 1919 at Camp Funston, Kansas.
- Reconstituted 24 March 1923 in the Regular Army as the 29th Field Artillery.
- Assigned 1 August 1940 at Fort Benning, Georgia, (less 2nd Battalion) as part of the 4th Division.
- (2nd Battalion activated at Fort Hoyle, Maryland) Inactivated 14 February 1946 at Camp Butner, North Carolina.
- Reactivated 15 July 1947 at Fort Ord, California.
- Inactivated 1 April 1957 at Fort Lewis, Washington, and relieved from assignment from the 4th Infantry Division. The *Battalion was reorganized and redesignated 31 July 1959 as the 29th Field Artillery, a parent regiment under the Combat Arms Regimental System.

== Distinctive unit insignia ==
- Description

A Gold color metal and enamel device 1 11/64 inches (3.0 cm) in height overall consisting of a shield blazoned: Gules, a sunflower slipped and leaved between two shells erect Or. Attached below and to the sides of the shield a Gold scroll inscribed “FIDELIS ET VERUS” in Red letters.

- Symbolism

Scarlet is the color of the Artillery. The functions of the organization are represented by the two shells placed on either side of the sunflower which represents the state of activation, Kansas.

- Background

The distinctive unit insignia was originally approved for the 29th Field Artillery Battalion on 26 June 1953. It was redesignated for the 29th Artillery Regiment on 14 August 1958. The insignia was redesignated effective 1 September 1971, for the 29th Field Artillery Regiment.

== Coat of arms ==
- Blazon
- Shield

Gules, a sunflower slipped and leaved between two shells erect Or.

- Crest

On a wreath Or and Gules, a trident palewise Azure, the cross bar bearing 8 bezants over the tines a mullet of 7 points of the first charged with an estoile of 6 points of the second, all surmounting a pair of artillery rammers saltirewise Gold. Motto FIDELIS ET VERUS (Faithful And True).

- Symbolism
- Shield

Scarlet is the color of the Artillery. The functions of the organization are represented by the two shells placed on either side of the sunflower which represents the state of activation, Kansas.

- Crest

The crest alludes to the landing of the 29th Artillery on the Normandy Beaches on 6 June 1944 for which the organization was awarded the Presidential Unit Citation. In this seaborne assault the 29th Artillery was part of Combat Team 8, the first combat team to land in the VII Corps sector on the right flank of the Allied invasion. The trident alludes to “Operation Neptune” which launched the Normandy assault and in this instance is blue in reference to the award of the Presidential Unit Citation. The 7 pointed mullet alludes to the VII Corps and is similar in silhouette to its shoulder sleeve insignia. The 8 bezants refer to Combat Team 8 and the 6 pointed star (from the coat of arms of Cherbourg) to the Cotentin Peninsula. The mullet and star also simulate a shell burst. The rammers, aside from their functional use in loading the pieces are used to symbolize “ramming home” the Normandy landing, the pushing forward in subsequent actions and final victory.

- Background

The coat of arms was originally approved for the 29th Field Artillery Battalion on 5 January 1943. It was redesignated for the 29th Artillery Regiment on 14 August 1958. It was amended to add a crest on 19 January 1966. The insignia was redesignated effective 1 September 1971, for the 29th Field Artillery Regiment.

== Current configuration ==
- 1st Battalion, 29th Field Artillery Regiment (United States)
- 2nd Battalion, 29th Field Artillery Regiment (United States)
- 3rd Battalion, 29th Field Artillery Regiment (United States)
- 4th Battalion, 29th Field Artillery Regiment (United States)
- 5th Battalion, 29th Field Artillery Regiment (United States) {deactivated}
- 6th Battalion, 29th Field Artillery Regiment (United States)

== See also ==
- Field Artillery Branch (United States)
- Coats of arms of U.S. Artillery Regiments
