= George King Hunter =

American brigadier general (born 1855, died 1940)

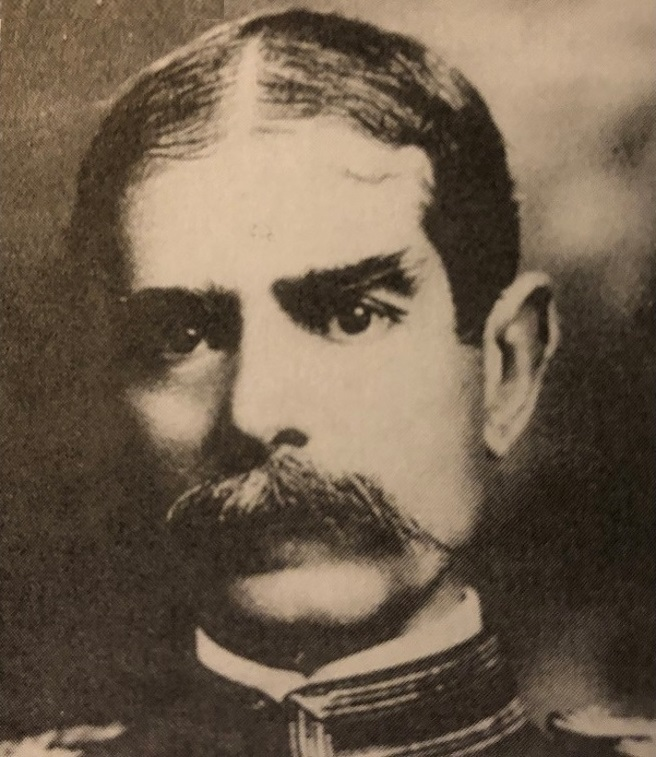
- Hunter circa 1918. West Point Digital Library.
- Born: April 6, 1855; Lancaster, Ohio, U.S.
- Died: February 2, 1940; New York City
- Burial place: Arlington National Cemetery
- Spouse: Mary E. Hinmann
- Children: 6
- Military career
- Allegiance: United States
- Branch: United States Army
- Service years: 1877–1919
- Rank: Brigadier General
- Service number: 0-13334
- Unit: U.S. Army Cavalry Branch
- Commands: Troop K, 3rd Cavalry; 1st Squadron, 15th Cavalry; 5th Cavalry Regiment; Fort Wingate; 7th Cavalry Regiment; Fort Riley; Fort William McKinley; 1st Cavalry Regiment; Presidio of Monterey, California; 164th Depot Brigade; 6th Infantry Brigade; Jefferson Barracks
- Conflicts: American Indian Wars; Spanish–American War; Philippine–American War; World War I
- Awards: Silver Star

George King Hunter (April 6, 1855 – February 2, 1940) was a career officer in the United States Army. A veteran of the American Indian Wars, Spanish–American War, Philippine–American War, and World War I, he was a recipient of the Silver Star and attained the rank of Brigadier General.

A native of Lancaster, Ohio, Hunter graduated from the United States Military Academy in 1877 and was assigned to the Cavalry branch. He performed duty throughout the western United States during the American Indian Wars, including expeditions and scouting missions in Arizona, New Mexico, and Texas. Hunter served in the Spanish–American War, and was wounded at the July 1898 Battle of San Juan Hill. His heroism during the battle was recognized with award of the Silver Star. Hunter commanded a Cavalry troop and squadron in the Philippines during the Philippine–American War, after which he performed duty in both the United States and the Philippines.

Hunter was promoted to brigadier general at the start of World War I, and commanded the 164th Depot Brigade, 6th Infantry Brigade, and Jefferson Barracks. He retired in July 1919. In retirement, Hunter resided in Cleveland, Ohio. He died at the Fifth Avenue Hotel in New York City on February 2, 1940. Hunter was buried at Arlington National Cemetery.

== Early life ==
George King Hunter in Lancaster, Ohio, was born on April 6, 1855, the son of Lieutenant Colonel Henry B. Hunter, a Union Army veteran of the American Civil War, and Josephine (King) Hunter. (Note: Generals in Khaki incorrectly gives Hunter's middle name as "Ring".) He was raised and educated in Lancaster, and worked in his father's pharmacy. In 1873, Hunter was appointed to the United States Military Academy. He graduated in 1877 ranked sixty-seven of seventy-six. Hunter received his commission as a second lieutenant of Cavalry and was assigned to the 4th Cavalry Regiment.

== Start of career ==
Hunter served with his regiment at Fort Elliott in Texas from 1877 to 1878, and at Fort Laramie in Wyoming beginning in 1878. In 1879, he was posted to Fort Fetterman and he took part in that year's expedition against the Utes. He was briefly assigned to Fort Sanders, Wyoming, in 1881, and then to Fort D. A. Russell. In May 1881, Hunter was promoted first lieutenant in the 3rd Cavalry.

From June 1881 to May 1882, Hunter was posted to Fort McKinney. In the summer of 1881, he was assigned to temporary duty as commander of the escort that traveled with a hunting party led by Randolph B. Marcy, who was then serving as Inspector General of the U.S. Army. From May to April 1885, Hunter served with his regiment at Fort Bowie, Arizona, where he took part in several scouting missions to track Native Americans during Geronimo's War. From April to December 1885, he was posted to Cantonment Peña Colorada, in Brewster County, Texas, where he continued to take part in scouting missions.

In November 1885, Hunter was assigned as adjutant of the 3rd Cavalry, and he served in this position at Fort Davis, Texas, until August 1886. He performed temporary recruiting duty from September 1886 to October 1888, after which he rejoined his regiment, first at Fort McIntosh, Texas, then at Fort Sam Houston, Texas. Hunter was promoted to captain in February 1891. He continued to perform duty during the last of the American Indian Wars, including service on the Rio Grande frontier throughout 1892. Hunter served with the 3rd Cavalry at Fort Reno in Oklahoma, from to June 1893 to October 1894. From October 1894 to April 1898, he performed duty with the 3rd Cavalry at Jefferson Barracks in Missouri.

== Spanish–American War ==
At the start of the Spanish–American War in April 1898, Hunter was with his regiment when it was assigned to Camp Thomas, Georgia, for organization and training. The 3rd Cavalry subsequently traveled to Tampa, Florida, where it awaited transport to Cuba. Hunter took part in the Santiago campaign and was wounded in the July 1, 1898 Battle of San Juan Hill.

Hunter received the Citation Star in recognition of his heroism during the fight. When the Silver Star was created during modernization of the Army's awards program, Hunter's Citation Star was converted to the new medal. After leaving Cuba, Hunter served with the 3rd Cavalry at Fort Ethan Allen, Vermont, then at Jefferson Barracks, Missouri.

== Philippine–American War ==
In August 1899, Hunter and the 3rd Cavalry sailed from Seattle, Washington, for duty during the Philippine–American War. The regiment arrived in the Philippines in October, and Hunter was assigned to command Troop K. During his Philippines service, Hunter took part in several expeditions commanded by generals in Henry Ware Lawton and Samuel Baldwin Marks Young. After the U.S. occupation stabilized, Hunter was appointed provost judge of the Ilocos Norte province. He was promoted to major in February 1901, and in May he assumed command of 1st Squadron, 15th Cavalry Regiment, which was assigned to Manila.

Hunter commanded his squadron on duty in Mindanao, where he simultaneously commanded a sub‑district of the Army's 1st District, which included the area from Misamis to Dapitan. Hunter subsequently served at Iligan, where he remained until April 1903. From April to October 1903, Hunter served as inspector general for the Army's Department of the Visayas and was based in Iloilo. Hunter returned to the United States in October 1903.

== Later career ==
Upon returning from the Philippines, Hunter was assigned to the 6th Cavalry Regiment at Fort Meade, South Dakota. He remained at Fort Meade until June 1906, when he was promoted to lieutenant colonel in the 5th Cavalry Regiment and posted to Fort Wingate, New Mexico. He commanded the regiment and post until October 1908. He served with the 5th Cavalry at Schofield Barracks, Hawaii, until March 1910, and was promoted to colonel in February 1910.

After becoming a colonel, Hunter commanded the 7th Regiment and the post at Fort Riley, Kansas, where he remained until January 1911. He served in the Philippines from March 1911 to July 1914, and commanded both the 7th Cavalry and the post at Fort William McKinley. From July to December 1914, Hunter commanded the 1st Cavalry Regiment and the post at the Presidio of Monterey, California. In December 1914, Hunter was detailed to the Army's inspector general's department, and he served as inspector general of the Central Department until August 1917.

== World War I ==
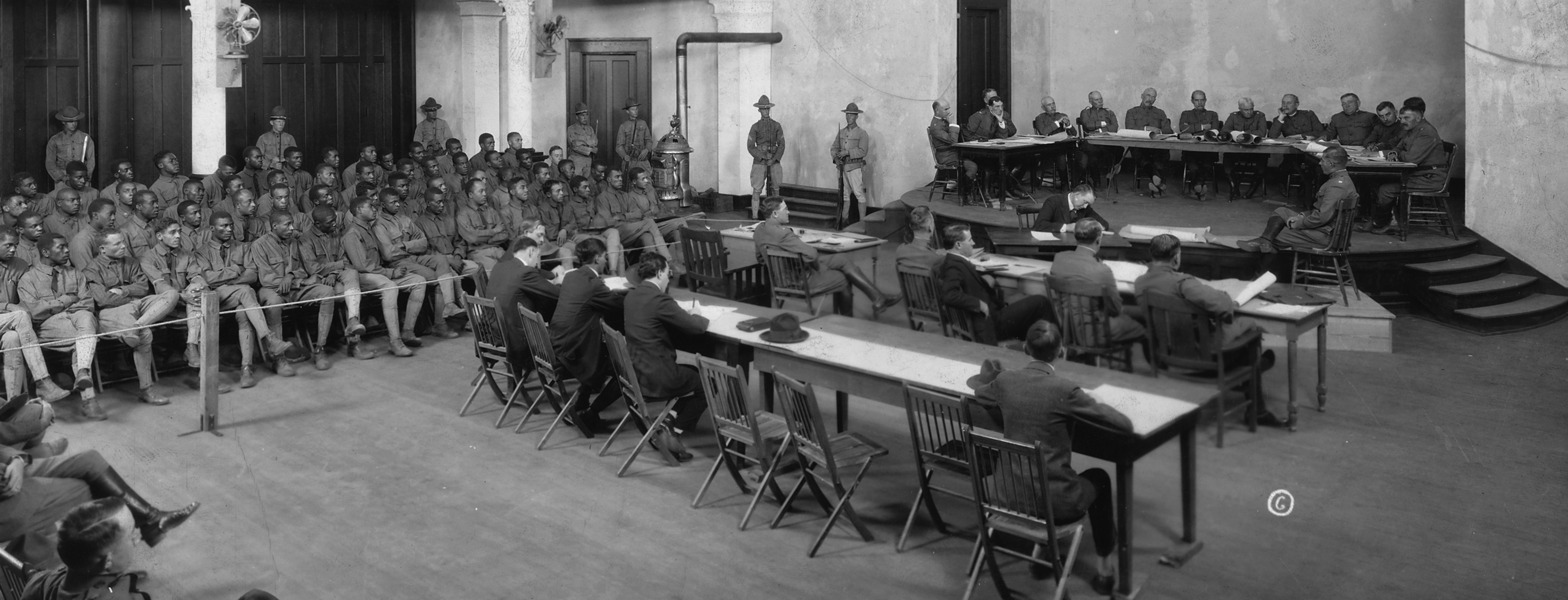
Trial of soldiers accused of taking part in the Houston riot of 1917. As president of the court-martial, Hunter can be identified sitting at the center of the table on the riser, where a gavel is visible in front of him.

Hunter was promoted to temporary brigadier general on August 5, 1917, and was assigned to command the 164th Depot Brigade at Camp Funston, Kansas, where he remained until October. From November to December 1917, Hunter was assigned as president of the court-martial for the trial of Black soldiers who were accused of participating in the Houston riot of 1917. In three courts-martial, 19 soldiers received the death penalty and 41 were sentenced to life imprisonment.

From December 1917 to February 1918, Hunter was assigned to Camp Greene, North Carolina, where he commanded the 6th Infantry Brigade. Hunter was retired as a colonel on February 4, 1918, but requested recall to active duty for continued wartime service. He was then assigned to command the post at Jefferson Barracks, Missouri. Hunter remained at Jefferson Barracks until the end of the war, and retired again in July 1919.

== Retirement and death ==
In retirement, Hunter was a resident of Cleveland, Ohio. He was active in several legacy societies and veterans organizations, including the Military Order of the Loyal Legion of the United States, Military Order of Foreign Wars, Military Order of the Carabao, and Sons of the American Revolution.

In 1930, the U.S. Congress enacted legislation allowing the general officers of World War I to retire at their highest rank, and Hunter was promoted to brigadier general on the retired list. His wife and he later moved to New York City's Fifth Avenue Hotel, where Hunter died on February 2, 1940. He was buried at Arlington National Cemetery.

== Family ==
In 1878, Hunter married Mary E. Hinman of Lancaster, Ohio. They were the parents of six children:

- George Bowditch, a U.S. Army brigadier general
- Russell Hinman, an executive with the construction company that built the Empire State Building
- Anna (wife of Colonel Robert Sterrett)
- Katharine (wife of Colonel Franklin Dudley Griffith Jr.)
- Helen (wife of Brigadier General William Vaulx Dawley Carter)
- Joseph Livermore, who was described as "insane" and spent his life in mental institutions
