= 28th Field Artillery Regiment =

US military unit

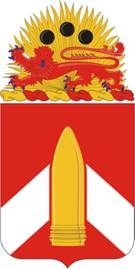
- Coat of arms
- Active: 1918
- Country: United States
- Branch: Army
- Type: Field artillery
- Motto(s): We Support the Line

Insignia
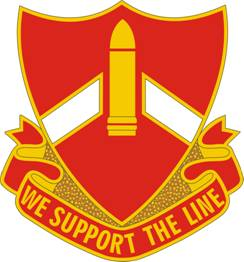
- Distinctive unit insignia

The 28th Field Artillery Regiment is a field artillery regiment of the United States Army, first constituted in 1918 in the National Army (USA).

== Lineage ==
Constituted 5 July 1918 in the National Army as the 28th Field Artillery and assigned to the 10th Division. Organized 10 August 1918 at Camp Funston, Kansas.

- Demobilized 7 February 1919 at Camp Funston, Kansas.
- Reconstituted 24 March 1923 in the Regular Army as the 28th Field Artillery. Assigned 1 January 1930 to the 8th Division (later redesignated as the 8th Infantry Division). Activated 1 July 1940 at Camp Jackson, South Carolina.
- Reorganized and redesignated 1 October 1940 as the 28th Field Artillery Battalion.
- Inactivated 25 October 1945 at Camp Leonard Wood, Missouri.
- Activated 17 August 1950 at Fort Jackson, South Carolina.

Relieved 1 August 1957 from assignment to the 8th Infantry Division; concurrently, reorganized and redesignated as the 28th Artillery, a parent regiment under the Combat Arms Regimental System. Redesignated 1 September 1971 as the 28th Field Artillery.

== Distinctive unit insignia ==
- Description

A Gold color metal and enamel device 1 1/8 inches (2.9 cm) in height overall consisting of a shield blazoned: Gules, a chevron Argent overall an artillery shell Or that portion on the chevron fimbriated of the field. Attached below the shield a Red scroll inscribed “WE SUPPORT THE LINE” in Gold letters.

- Symbolism

The shield is scarlet for Artillery. The white chevron representative of a rafter or support, with the shell, represents support of the line.

- Background

The distinctive unit insignia was originally approved for the 28th Field Artillery Regiment on 18 January 1940. It was amended to revise the description on 28 August 1940. The insignia was redesignated for the 28th Field Artillery Battalion on 26 February 1941. It was redesignated for the 28th Artillery Regiment on 4 August 1958. It was redesignated for the 28th Field Artillery Regiment on 1 September 1971. The insignia was redesignated for the 28th Field Artillery Regiment on 5 February 1973.

== Coat of arms ==
- Blazon
- Shield

Gules, a chevron Argent overall an artillery shell Or that portion on the chevron fimbriated of the field.

- Crest

On a wreath of the colors Or and Gules, in front of a palmetto branch of the first bearing in chief three gunstones, a lion passant guardant of the second armed and langued Azure. Motto WE SUPPORT THE LINE.

- Symbolism
- Shield

The shield is scarlet for Artillery. The white chevron representative of a rafter or support, with the shell, represents support of the line.

- Crest

The lion is from the coat of arms of Normandy. It refers to combat service in Normandy in World War II for which the unit was awarded the French Croix de Guerre with Palm. The gold palm is for victory. In addition, it simulates a bomb burst and refers to artillery fire. The three gunstones stand for the unit's participation in the campaigns in Northern France, the Rhineland and Central Europe.

- Background

The coat of arms was originally approved for the 28th Field Artillery Regiment on 18 January 1940. It was amended to revise the blazon of the shield on 28 August 1940. The insignia was redesignated for the 28th Field Artillery Battalion on 26 February 1941. It was redesignated for the 28th Artillery Regiment on 4 August 1958. It was amended to add a crest on 2 October 1964. It was redesignated for the 28th Field Artillery Regiment on 1 September 1971. The insignia was redesignated for the 28th Field Artillery Regiment on 5 February 1973.

== Current configuration ==
- 1st Battalion 28th Field Artillery Regiment (United States)
- 2nd Battalion 28th Field Artillery Regiment (United States)
- 3rd Battalion 28th Field Artillery Regiment (United States)
- 4th Battalion 28th Field Artillery Regiment (United States)
- 5th Battalion 28th Field Artillery Regiment (United States)
- 6th Battalion 28th Field Artillery Regiment (United States)

== Campigan participation credit ==
- World War II
- Normandy
- Northern France
- Rhineland
- Central Europe

== Decorations ==
- French Croix de Guerre with Palm, World War II,
- Streamer embroidered NORMANDY
- Luxembourg Croix de Guerre,
- Streamer embroidered LUXEMBOURG

== See also ==
- Field Artillery Branch (United States)
