= 69th Infantry Regiment (United States) =

69th Infantry Regiment (Light Tank)
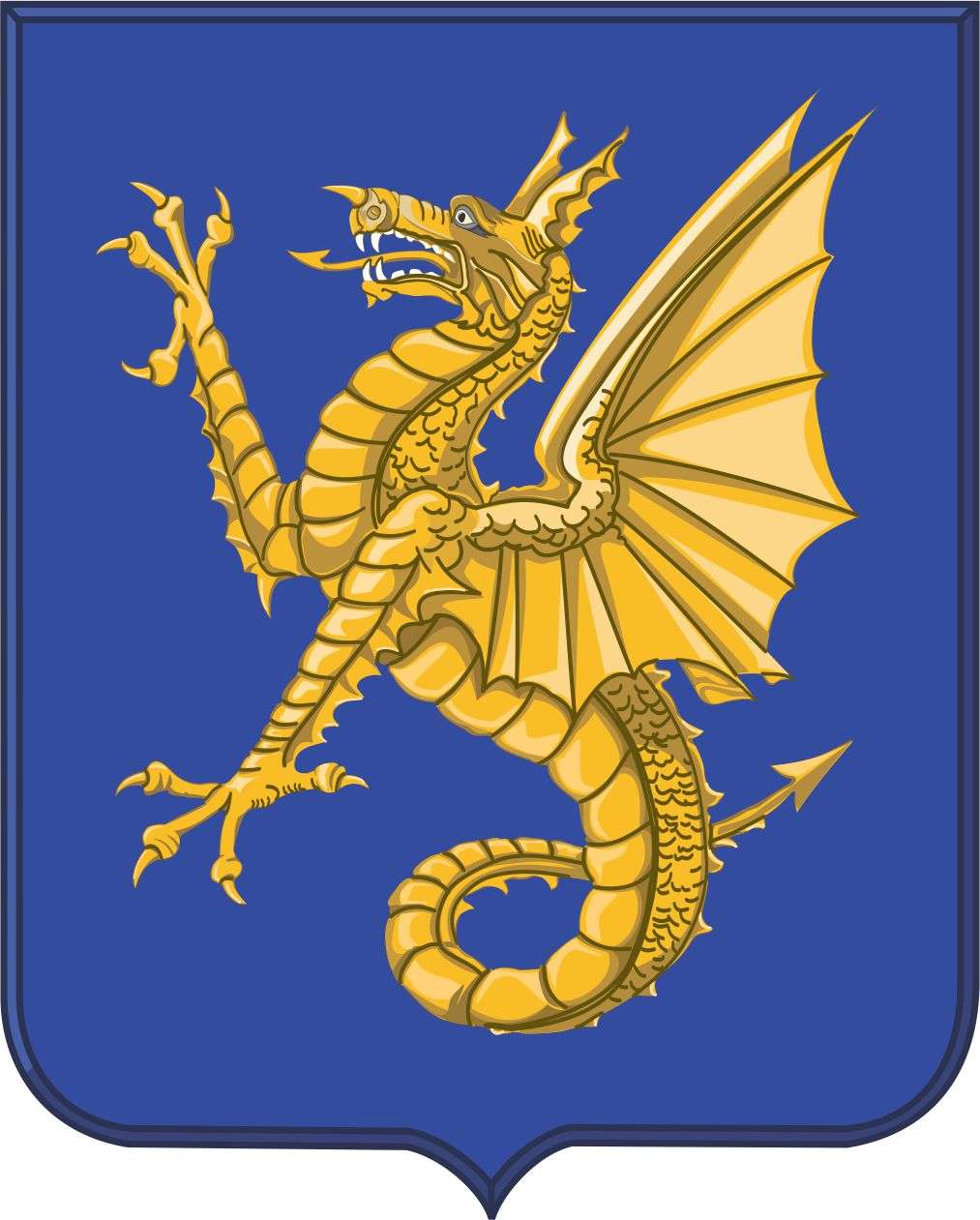
- Coat of arms
- Active: 1918-1919; 1934-1944
- Country: United States
- Branch: United States Army
- Type: Infantry
- Size: Regiment
- Motto: Conjunctis Viribus (With united powers)

Insignia
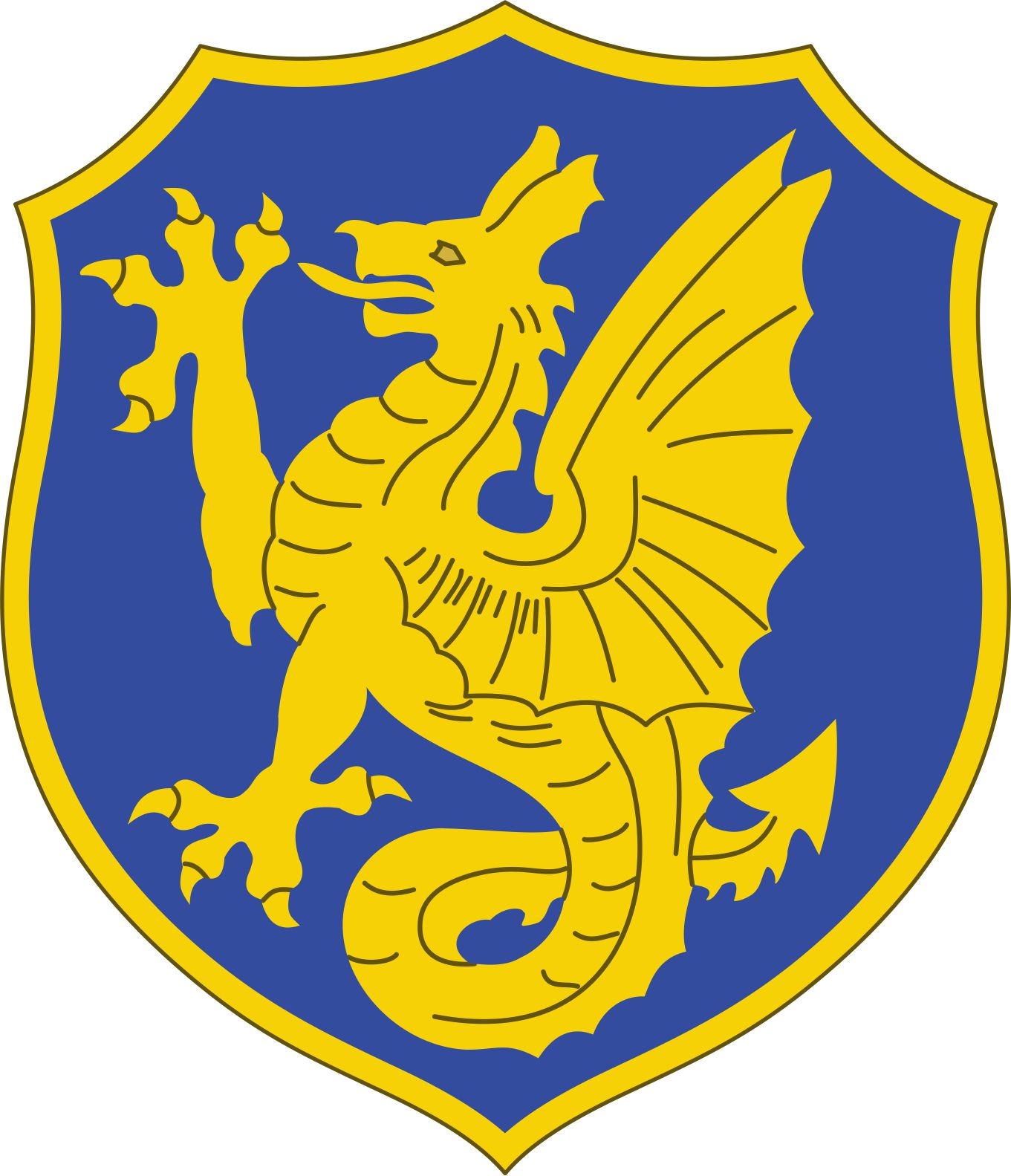
- Distinctive unit insignia

The 69th Infantry Regiment was a United States Regular Army (United States) infantry regiment that never saw combat.

The regiment was constituted 9 July 1918 in the Regular Army as the 69th Infantry and assigned to the 10th Infantry Division; Organized 10 August 1918 at Camp Funston, Kansas from personnel of the 41st Infantry. Relieved from the 10th Division and demobilized 13 February 1919 at Camp Funston.

The regiment was constituted in the Regular Army as the 69th Infantry Regiment (Light Tanks) on 1 October 1933 and allotted to the Seventh Corps Area. It was organized by October 1934 with Organized Reserve personnel as a "Regular Army Inactive" unit with headquarters at Minneapolis, Minnesota. It typically conducted inactive training period meetings at the University of Minnesota's ROTC armory or the Federal Building in Minneapolis, and conducted summer training at Fort Snelling, Minnesota. It also conducted infantry Citizens Military Training Camps some years at Fort Snelling as an alternate form of summer training. The regiment was disbanded on 11 November 1944.

== Distinctive unit insignia ==
- Description: A Gold color metal and enamel device 1 1/4 inches (3.2 cm) in height overall consisting of a shield blazoned: Azure, a wyvern erect Or.
- Symbolism: The shield is blue for Infantry. The wyvern is a fabulous monster whose glance is death, and to whom is attributed the power to go through flames and to crush and destroy, it also symbolizes mobility.
- Background: The distinctive unit insignia was approved on 23 June 1939. It was rescinded on 27 January 1959.

== Coat of arms ==
- Blazon
  - Shield: Azure, a wyvern erect Or.
  - Crest: None.
  - Motto: CONJUNCTIS VIRIBUS (With United Powers).
- Symbolism
  - Shield: The shield is blue for Infantry. The wyvern is a fabulous monster whose glance is death, and to whom is attributed the power to go through flames and to crush and destroy, it also symbolizes mobility.
  - Crest: None.
- Background: The coat of arms was approved on 23 June 1939. It was rescinded on 27 January 1959.
