= Camp Funston =

US Army training camp in Fort Riley, Kansas

Coordinates: 39°05′46″N 96°43′35″W

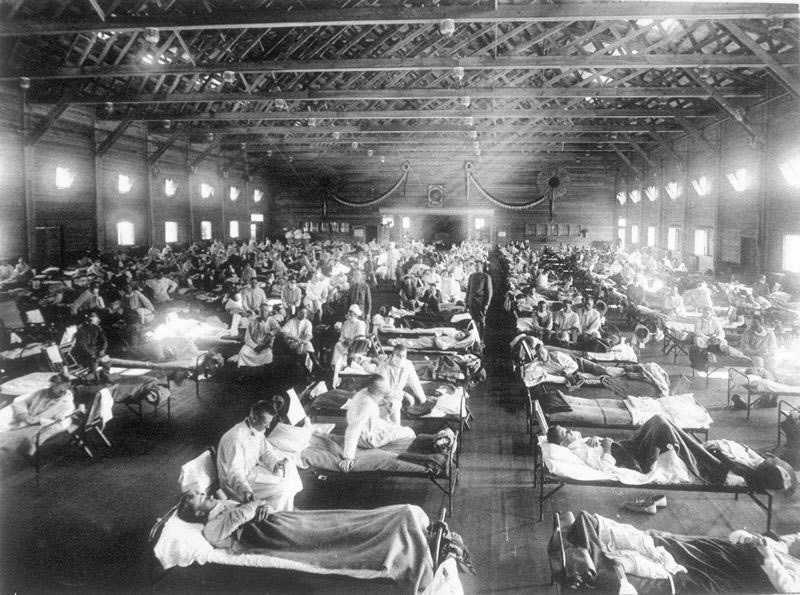
Soldiers ill with Spanish influenza at a hospital ward at Camp Funston, Kansas, when the epidemic began in 1918.

Camp Funston is a U.S. Army training camp located on the grounds of Fort Riley, southwest of Manhattan, Kansas. The camp was named for Brigadier General Frederick Funston (1865–1917). It is one of sixteen such camps that were established at the outbreak of World War I for use as infantry division training camps.

== History ==
=== World War I ===
Construction began during the summer of 1917 and eventually encompassed approximately 1,400 buildings on 2,000 acres (8.1 km^{2}). The Camp Funston garrison was administered by the 164th Depot Brigade, commanders of which included George King Hunter. Depot brigades were responsible for receiving, housing, equipping, and training enlistees and draftees, and for demobilizing them after the war.

During World War I, two divisions commanded by Major General Leonard Wood, totaling nearly 50,000 recruits, trained at Camp Funston. Notable units who received training at Camp Funston include the 89th Division, which was deployed to France in the spring of 1918, the 10th Division and black soldiers assigned to the 92nd Division. During World War I, Camp Funston also served as a detention camp for conscientious objectors (COs) many of which were Mennonite in faith. Since it was compulsory, Hutterites sent their young men to military camps, but they did not allow them to obey any military commands or wear a uniform.

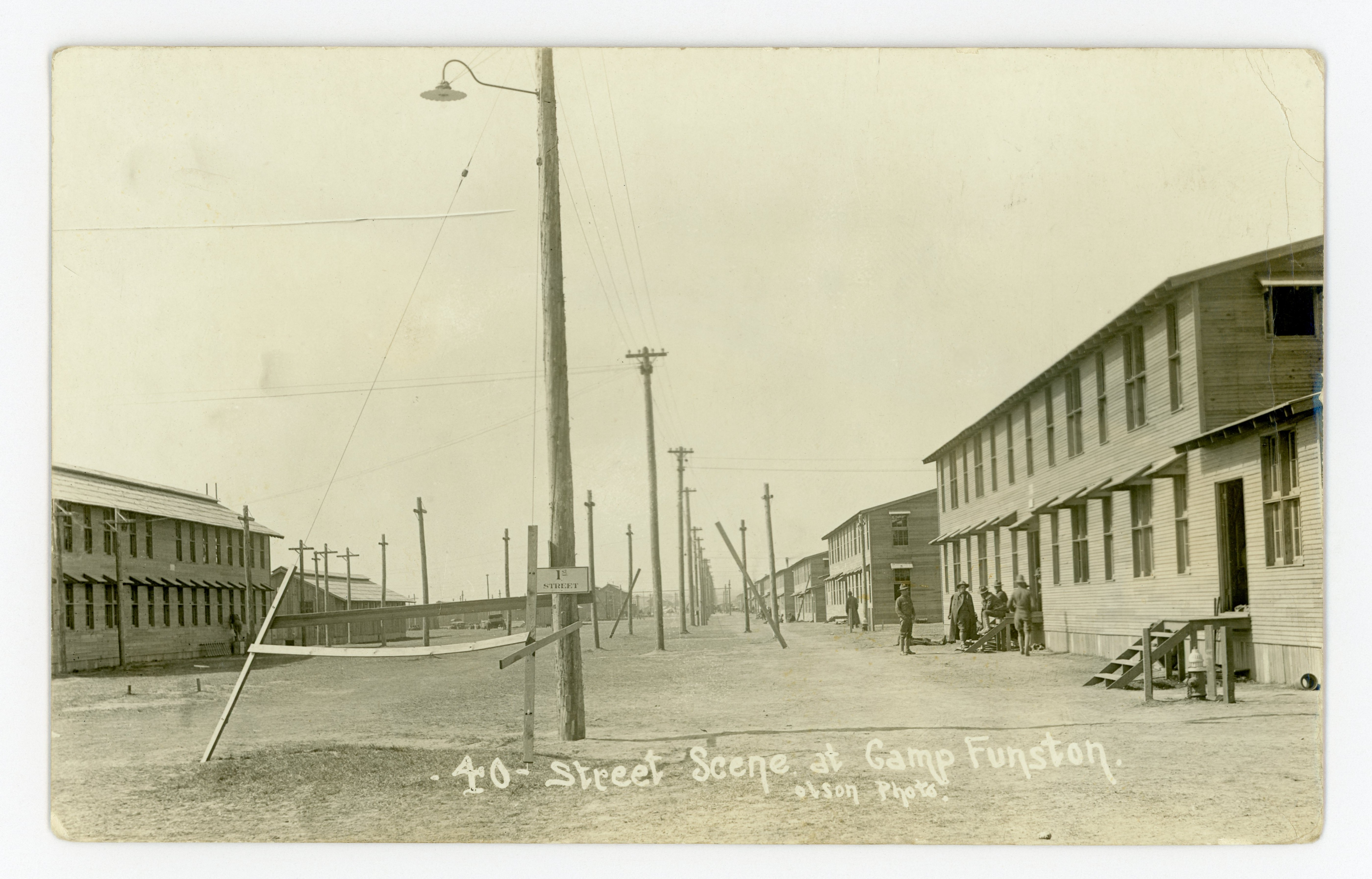
Postcard of Camp Funston (circa 1917-18)

In March 1918, some of the first recorded American cases of what came to be the worldwide influenza pandemic, also known as "Spanish flu", were reported at Camp Funston. The first, on 4 March 1918, being Albert Gitchell, an army cook at Camp Funston, despite there having been cases before him. Within days of the 4 March first case at Camp Funston, 522 men at the camp had reported sick. After the Armistice of November 11, 1918 ended the war, the 164th Depot Brigade, commanded by William J. Glasgow, was responsible for mustering soldiers out and processing their discharges.

In July 1921, Camp Funston was abandoned, with the Army salvaging most of the frame buildings (except those intended for the cavalry) but preserving the heating plant and waterworks for potential future emergencies. In December 1922, the Army sold the remaining barracks at the camp.

=== Correctional camp ===
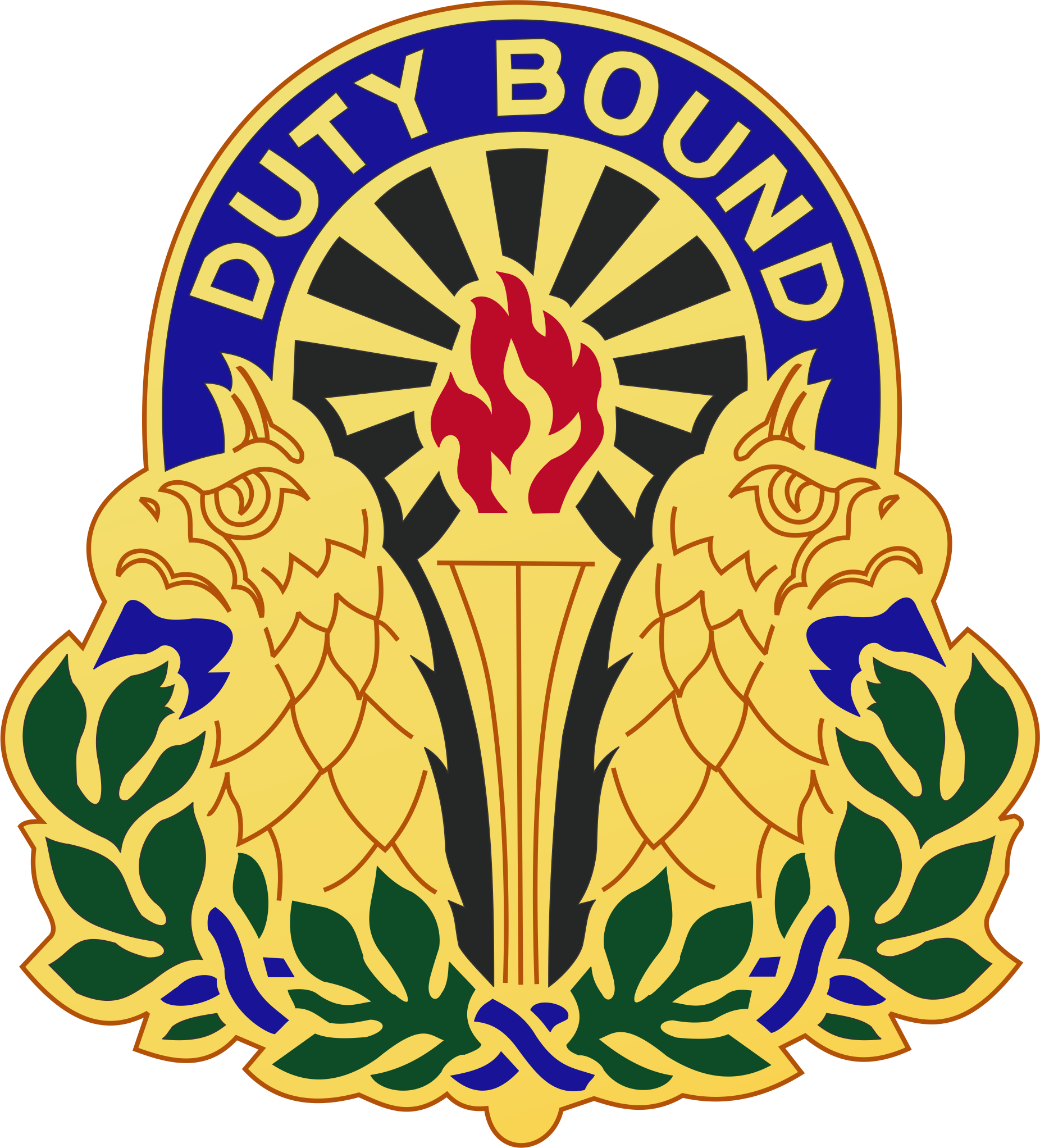
US Army Correctional Training Facility insignia

Prior to October 1992, Camp Funston was the home of the United States Army Correctional Activity, formerly the U.S. Army Retraining Brigade, whose mission was officially to prepare military prisoners for transition to civilian life as useful citizens with general discharges or, in a few select cases, for return to duty. The Correctional Brigade environment was unique in that prisoner control was maintained by military discipline, instead of walls and bars, for most of the typical prisoners’ stay. The Correctional Brigade doctrine was that the minimum-custody/military discipline environment when coupled with correctional treatment, educational programs, and military and vocational training best prepared the typical first-time prisoner for a crime-free life after prison as either a productive soldier or a useful citizen in civilian life. Moreover, this correctional system was asserted to be less expensive to establish and operate than the traditional prison. The camp had a cinema that was open to the residents of Fort Riley, including those outside of Camp Funston.

=== Modern use ===
Camp Funston was the location where the training of all military transition teams for service in Iraq and Afghanistan took place. Previously, transition teams had been trained at several U.S. Army installations, most notably Fort Carson, Colorado; Camp Atterbury, Indiana; Fort Hood, Texas; and Camp Shelby, Mississippi. However, in early 2006, the U.S. Army decided to consolidate all training at Fort Riley, Kansas, in order to standardize and improve training for that critical mission.

The first teams began training on June 1, 2006. The 1st Brigade, 1st Infantry Division took over command and control of the TT mission in October 2006. The brigade is responsible for the formation and training of the TT teams. This mission shifted to Fort Polk, Louisiana later in 2009.
