= Guy Carleton (United States Army officer) =

United States Army general

Guy Edward Carleton
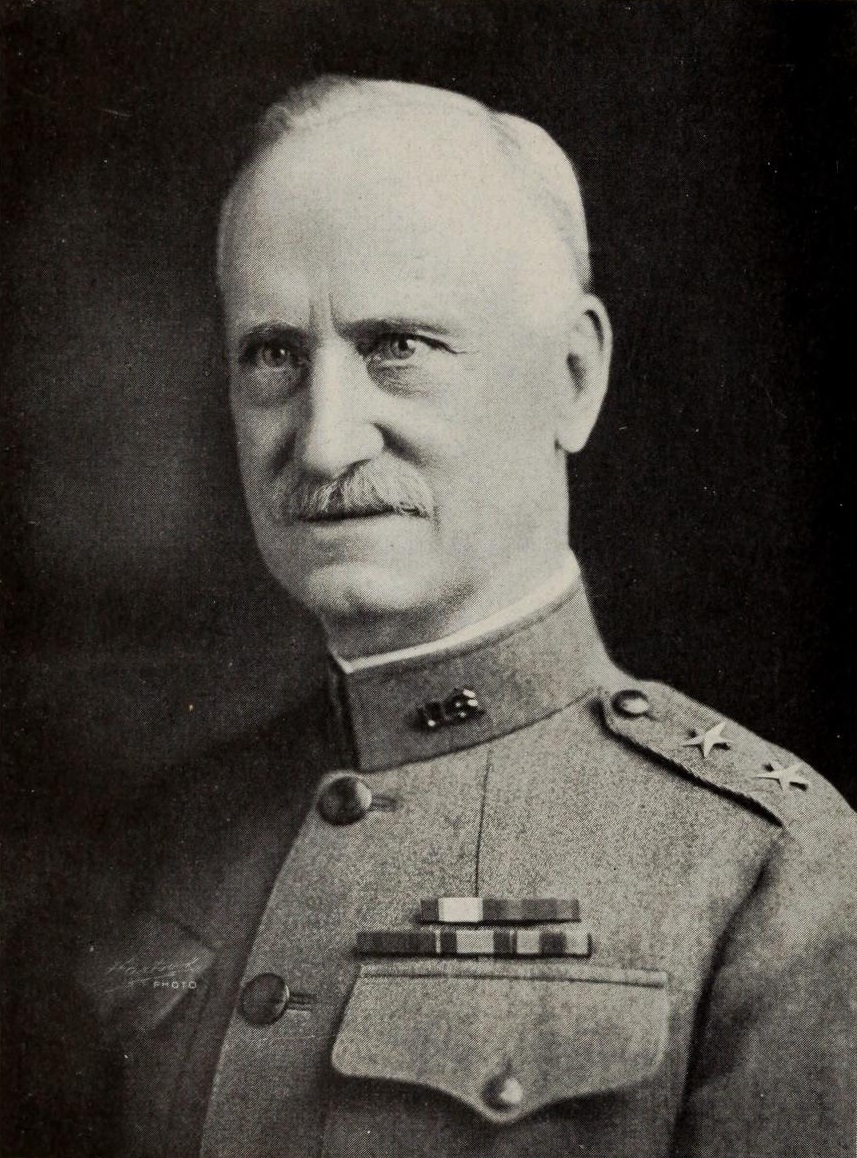
- From 1927's The Story of the 27th Division.
- Born: September 9, 1857; Austin, Texas, U.S.
- Died: January 8, 1946 (aged 88); San Antonio, Texas, U.S.
- Burial place: Fort Sam Houston National Cemetery, San Antonio, Texas
- Spouse: Cora Belle Arthur (m. 1883)
- Children: 2
- Relatives: Pelham D. Glassford (son-in-law)
- Military career
- Allegiance: United States of America
- Branch: United States Army
- Service years: 1881–1921
- Rank: Major General
- Service number: 0-128
- Unit: Cavalry Branch
- Commands: Troop L, 2nd Cavalry Regiment; Campechuela District, Cuba; 2nd Squadron, 10th Cavalry Regiment; 3rd Squadron, 4th Cavalry Regiment; Eagle Pass, Texas Garrison; Brownsville District, Texas; Camp Zachary Taylor, Kentucky and 159th Depot Brigade; Camp Wadsworth, South Carolina and 96th Division; Camp Kearny, California and 16th Division; Camp Lewis, Washington and 166th Depot Brigade; 10th Cavalry Regiment
- Conflicts: Indian Wars; Spanish–American War; Philippine–American War; Veracruz Expedition; World War I
- Awards: Distinguished Service Medal

Guy Carleton (September 9, 1857 – January 8, 1946) was a career officer in the United States Army. He attained the rank of major general, and is best known for his World War I command of Camp Wadsworth (near Spartanburg, South Carolina) and the 96th Division.

Carleton was an 1881 graduate of the United States Military Academy; assigned to the Cavalry, he served throughout the west during the last of the American Indian Wars. He was a veteran of the Spanish–American War, the Philippine–American War, and the Veracruz Expedition. During World War I, he commanded Camp Zachary Taylor, Kentucky and the 159th Depot Brigade, followed by Camp Wadsworth, South Carolina and the 96th Division, and then Camp Kearny, California and the 16th Division. After the war, Carleton commanded Camp Lewis, Washington and the 166th Depot Brigade.

After serving with the Inspector General's Department in San Francisco, Carleton retired in 1921. He died in San Antonio, Texas in 1946, and was buried at Fort Sam Houston National Cemetery.

== Early life and education ==
Guy Edward Carleton was born in Austin, Texas on September 9, 1857, the son of William Carleton (1812–1865) and Elizabeth (Coxhead) Carleton, natives of England who had immigrated to the United States in 1834. William Carleton was a participant in the Texas Revolution on the side of the Texans, including the Battle of Goliad. William and Elizabeth Carleton subsequently moved to New Orleans, where William Carleton worked as a journalist. He returned to Texas in the 1850s and settled in Austin; awarded bounty lands in recognition of his military service, Carleton sold his grants to finance the start of a newspaper. He served as publisher and editor of the weekly Austin Rambler until his death.

Guy Carleton was his parents' ninth child; he attended Austin's J. B. Smith School and Texas Military Academy, after which he began to study law in the office of his older brother Frederick. In addition, Carleton worked as treasurer and bookkeeper for the Austin Street Railway Company.

In 1877, Carleton won appointment to the United States Military Academy; he graduated in 1881, ranked number 17 of 53.

== Start of career ==
=== Indian Wars ===
Carleton requested service in the Cavalry branch, and was commissioned as a second lieutenant in the 2nd Cavalry Regiment. Carleton served on the frontier during the last of the American Indian Wars, including postings to Fort Assinniboine, Fort McGinnis, and Fort Custer in Montana, as well as Fort Coeur d' Alene, Idaho from 1881 to 1886. From 1886 to 1889, he was Corps Commandant and professor of military science at the Agricultural and Mechanical College of Texas.

After completing his assignment at Texas A&M, Carleton rejoined the 2nd Cavalry, and served briefly at Fort Walla Walla, Washington and in Arizona before moving on to Fort Wingate, New Mexico, where he remained until 1895. Carleton performed recruiting duty in Saint Paul, Minnesota from 1895 to 1897, after which he rejoined the 2nd Cavalry at Fort Riley, Kansas. From April to July, 1898 he commanded Troop L, 2nd Cavalry.

=== Spanish–American War ===
On July 1, 1898, Carleton received promotion to captain, and was assigned to the 10th Cavalry in Huntsville, Alabama. After moving to Fort Sam Houston, Texas to complete training, in the spring of 1899 the 10th Cavalry proceeded to Cuba. Carleton was assigned to a troop that patrolled the Province of Santiago, after which he commanded the District of Campechuela, before the troop moved to Manzanillo. After returning to the United States in early 1900, the 10th Cavalry performed patrol duty along the Texas-Mexico Border. As commander of the garrison based at Fort Ringgold near Rio Grande City, Texas, Carleton was commended for his work to improve civilian goodwill towards the soldiers in the area, which had been in decline during the war.

=== Philippine-American War ===
After returning to Fort Sam Houston for training and garrison duty from September 1900 to April 1901, in April the 10th Cavalry departed for the Philippines. The 10th Cavalry served in the Gandara Valley on the Island of Samar, and were credited with destroying an insurgent camp at Blanca Aurora, which enabled them to end the insurgency in the Gandara Valley (now Gandara, Samar).

Carleton commanded 2nd Squadron, 10th Cavalry, after which he was detailed to serve in the Paymaster's Department in Manila, after which he continued to serve as a paymaster at Fort Sam Houston.

== Later career ==
=== Captain to lieutenant colonel ===
In late 1905, Carleton was assigned to the 13th Cavalry Regiment at Fort Riley, Kansas. He was promoted to major in the 13th Cavalry in 1906, and then returned to the Philippines with the 4th Cavalry Regiment, serving this time on the Island of Jolo. He returned to the United States with the 4th Cavalry, and served at Fort Meade in South Dakota as commander of 3rd Squadron, 4th Cavalry until he was assigned as a student at Fort Leavenworth's School of the Line. Upon completing the 10-week course, Carleton became a student at the United States Army War College; after his graduation, he was retained there as an instructor. In 1912, Carleton was promoted to lieutenant colonel and assigned to the 3rd Cavalry Regiment, after which he performed patrol duty with his regiment on the Texas-Mexico border. He subsequently commanded the post at Eagle Pass, Texas, and then the Brownsville District.

=== Lieutenant colonel to colonel ===
In 1914, Carleton was assigned to the Port of Galveston, Texas as embarkation officer, and was responsible for arranging transportation for troops, animals and equipment taking part in the Veracruz Expedition. In 1916, Carleton was promoted to colonel and assigned to the Inspector General's Department in San Francisco. From October 1916 to early 1917, Carleton served with the Inspector General's Department in the Philippines.

== World War I ==
At the start of World War I, Carleton was promoted to temporary brigadier general, and assigned to command Camp Zachary Taylor, Kentucky and the 159th Depot Brigade.

In 1918, Carleton was promoted to temporary major general; the War Department gave Carleton the option of departing for France, potentially to assume command of the 4th Division, or taking command of Camp Wadsworth, South Carolina and the 96th Division. Carleton opted for Camp Wadsworth, with the assumption that he would organize and train the 96th Division and then lead it in combat in France. The Armistice in November ended the need for new soldiers in France, and the 96th Division was demobilized.

== Post-World War I ==
In 1919, Carleton took command of the 16th Division at Camp Kearny, California in order to prepare it for possible service as part of American Expeditionary Force Siberia; the 16th Division's services were not needed in Siberia, and Carleton demobilized it. He then commanded Camp Lewis and the 166th Depot Brigade, where he oversaw demobilization and discharge of soldiers returning from France.

After completing his demobilization duties, Carleton reverted to his permanent rank of colonel, and commanded the 10th Cavalry Regiment in Arizona; he served again with the Inspector General's Department in San Francisco until he retired on September 9, 1921.

== Awards ==
Carleton received the Army Distinguished Service Medal for his service as commander of Camp Wadsworth and the 96th Division during World War I.

His other awards included the Indian Campaign Medal, Spanish Campaign Medal, Army of Cuban Occupation Medal, Philippine Campaign Medal, Mexican Border Service Medal, and World War I Victory Medal.

== Retirement and death ==
In retirement, Carleton was a resident of San Antonio, Texas. In 1930, Congress passed a law allowing World War I generals to retire at the highest rank they had held, and Carleton was promoted to major general on the retired list. He died in San Antonio on January 8, 1946, and was buried at Fort Sam Houston National Cemetery, Section E, Site 383.

== Family ==
Carleton married Cora Belle Arthur in Austin on June 20, 1883. Guy and Cora Carleton were the parents of two daughters, Cora (1887–1958) and Nellie (1890–1962). Cora Carleton was the first wife of Brig. Gen. Pelham D. Glassford.

== Biography ==
Cora Carleton Glassford prepared a biography of her father, A Life in the Old Army, the manuscript for which is part of the Cora Carleton Glassford Papers. Cora Carleton Glassford's papers are included in the collections of the Daughters of the Republic of Texas Library. Cora's biography has been edited and annotated by her grandson, Dr. William Guy Carleton Parke, and published with the title, Tales of a Frontier Cavalryman, distributed by Amazon.

== Sources ==
=== Books ===
- Davis, Henry Blaine Jr. (1998). Generals in Khaki. Raleigh, NC: Pentland Press. ISBN 978-1-57197-088-6.

=== Internet ===
- Glassford, Cora Carleton (2010-06-12). "Biography: Carleton, William". Handbook of Texas Online. Austin, TX: Texas State Historical Association.
- Glassford, Cora Carleton. "Col. 892 Cora Carleton Glassford Papers, 1862–1958". www.drtl.org. Austin, TX: Daughters of the Republic of Texas. Archived from the original on April 24, 2016.
- Thayer, Bill. "Entries for Guy Carleton in Cullum's Register of the Graduates of the United States Military Academy, Volumes III to IX". penelope.uchicago.edu/. Bill Thayer.
- White, H. A. (1946). "Memorial, Guy Carleton, 1881". externalapps.westpointaog.org. West Point, NY: West Point Association of Graduates. Archived from the original on 2017-04-18.
