= Camp Wadsworth =

U.S. Army WWI military post

- Spartanburg, South Carolina, U.S.
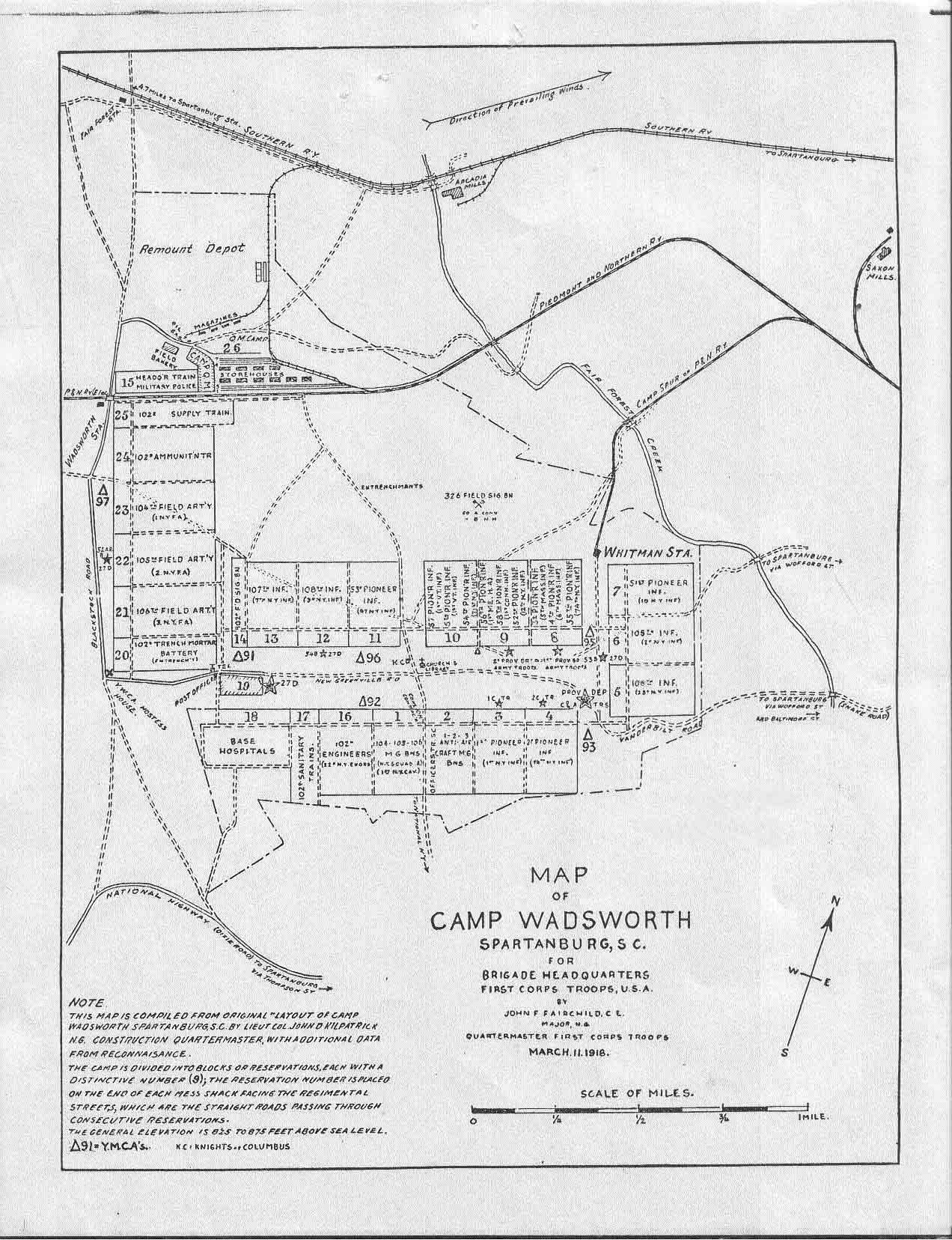
- 27th Division's 1918 map of Camp Wadsworth, South Carolina

Location
- Coordinates: 34°56′25″N 81°59′10″W
- Area: 2,000 acres

Site history
- Built: 1917
- In use: 1917–1919
- Fate: Buildings and equipment salvaged, site developed as residential neighborhood
- Battles/wars: World War I

Camp Wadsworth was a World War I-era training facility for the United States Army. Located near Spartanburg, South Carolina, the post was in operation from its opening in July 1917 until it was inactivated in March 1919, following the Armistice that ended the war.

== Creation ==
As the United States began to expand the United States Army in preparation for entry into World War I, the United States Department of War planned to enlarge the peacetime Regular Army through a combination of mobilizing units of the National Guard and drafting men into the wartime National Army. This plan called for the creation of 32 new mobilization and training centers, evenly split between the National Army and the National Guard. Each post was to be responsible for organizing and training a complete army division. The National Army camps were equipped with heated barracks and other facilities, while the plan called for National Guard camps, which were needed sooner because National Guard members could be available for training more quickly than draftees, to consist primarily of tents and a small number of temporary structures. As a result of these construction requirements, the War Department intended for most National Guard training sites to be located in the southern United States, where milder winters and warmer temperatures were more prevalent than in the north.

Many cities and towns lobbied to have one of the wartime encampments located nearby, anticipating the temporary economic boom such a facility might bring to the local area. The city leaders of Spartanburg were among those who vied for one of these training facilities; their lobbying and marketing efforts were successful, and Newton D. Baker, the Secretary of War, and Leonard Wood, the commander of the Army's Eastern Department, approved Spartanburg for a National Guard camp in May 1917, after having made personal inspection tours of the area.

The area chosen for the camp was approximately three miles outside of the city; at the time, a small number of African-American cotton farmers leased part of the land, but most of it was undeveloped and heavily wooded. On July 4, 1917, the landowner leased a 2,000-acre tract to the city; two days later, the mayor conveyed to the federal government permission to use the land.

== Description ==
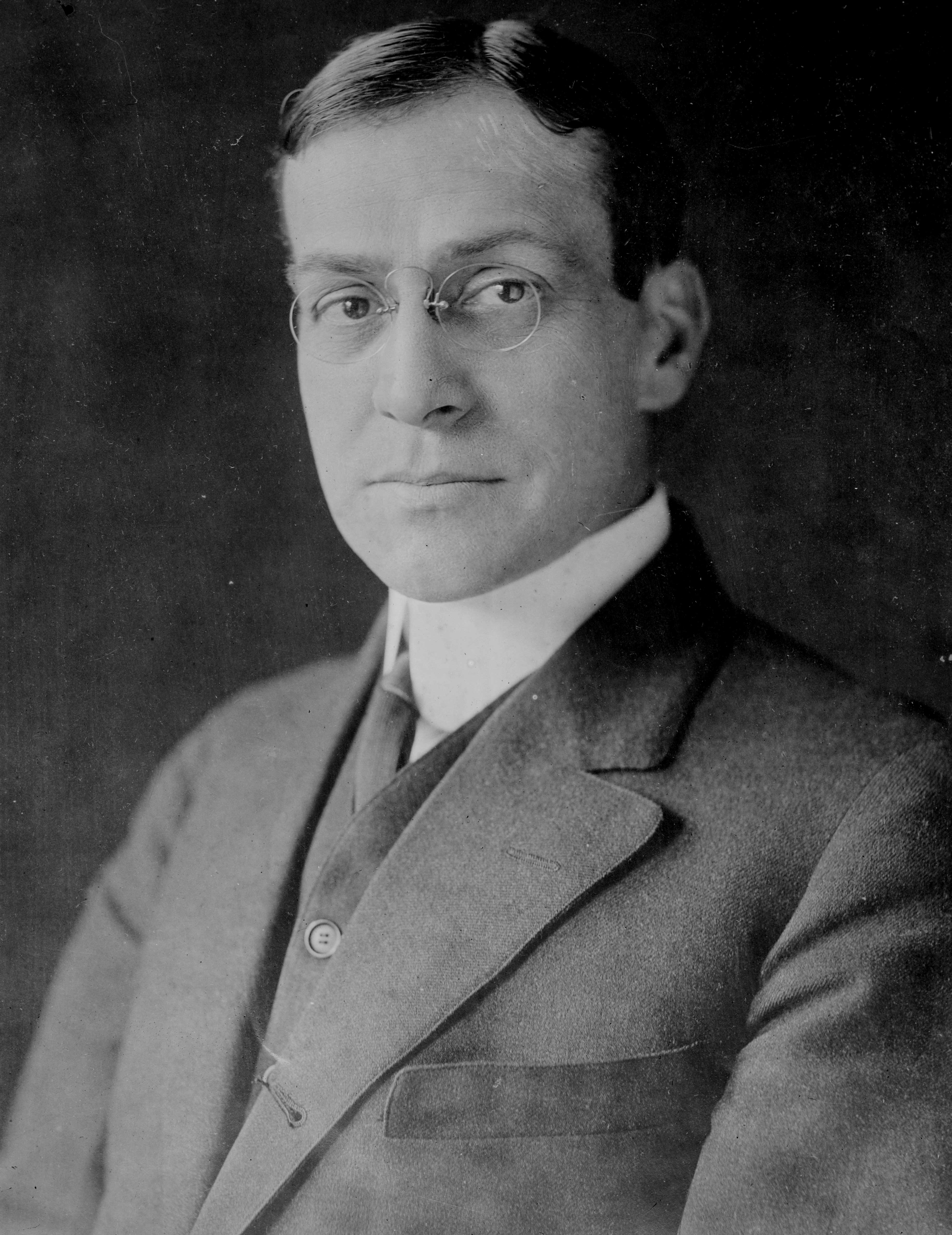
Secretary of War Newton D. Baker approved the Spartanburg site where Camp Wadsworth was constructed.

The land approved for construction of the training camp was a large plateau with rolling hills and small streams. On the east, the selected site was bordered by Fairforest Creek, the largest stream in the area. On the west, it was bordered by Blackstock Road. At its northern edge, the proposed facility included the Piedmont and Northern Railway, an interurban electric railroad which became its primary rail line. To the south, the future Camp Wadsworth was bordered by Holston's Creek.

== Construction ==
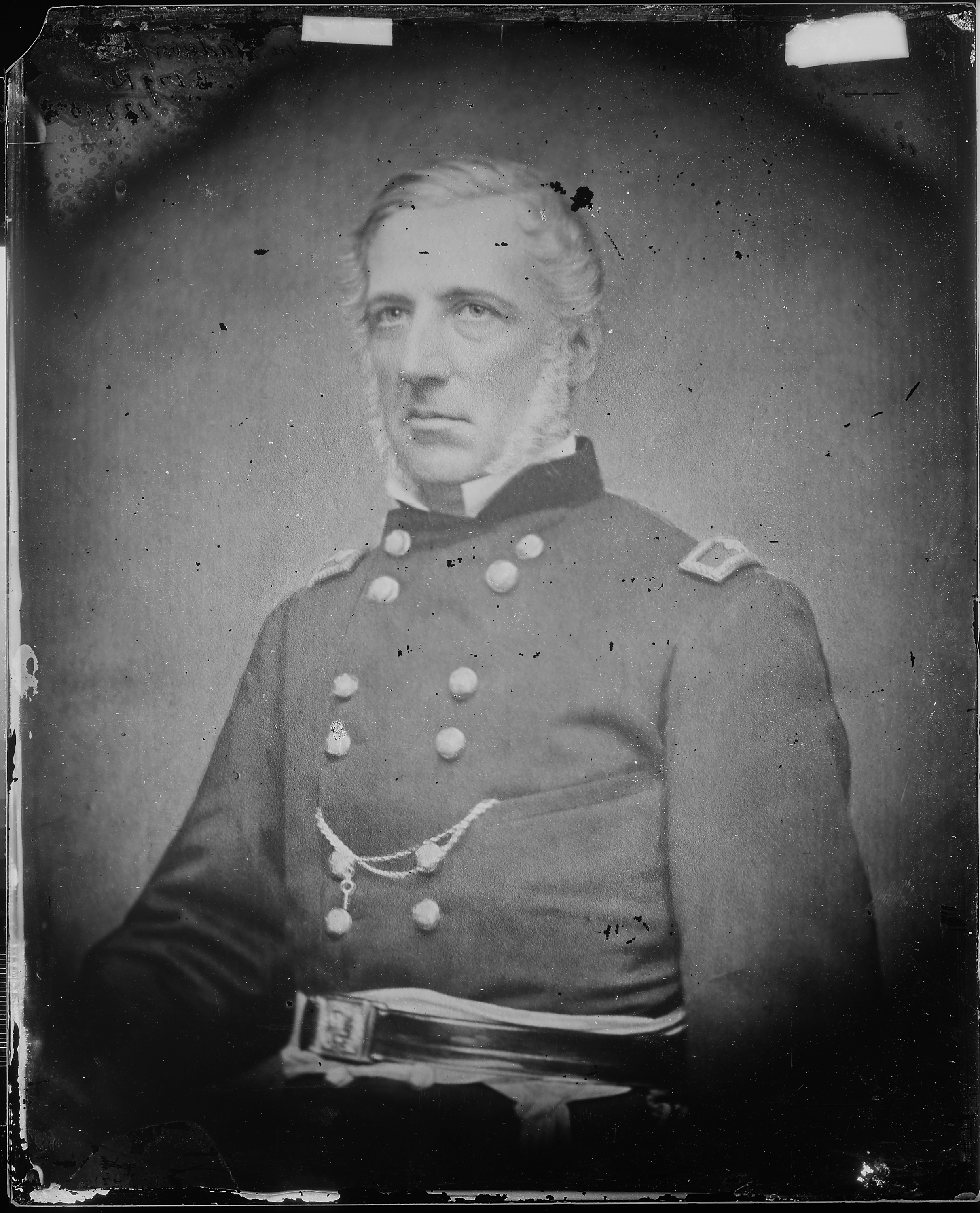
James S. Wadsworth, the Union Army officer for whom Camp Wadsworth was named.

On July 13, 1917, the War Department indicated that a division of the New York National Guard would be organized and trained at the new Spartanburg-area camp. Later in the month, the Department of War announced that the facility could be called Camp Wadsworth in honor of James S. Wadsworth, a prominent resident of New York who had served as a brigadier general in the Union Army during the American Civil War, and had been killed during the Battle of the Wilderness. (Note: Wadsworth's son James Wolcott Wadsworth and grandson James Wolcott Wadsworth Jr. were prominent New York politicians; the younger Wadsworth served as a United States senator during World War I, and visited the camp for the Thanksgiving holiday in 1917.)

The contract to build Camp Wadsworth was awarded in mid-July, and construction started immediately, with a two-month deadline for completion. Thousands of civilian workers cleared trees, laid pipes for water and sewage, built roads, and erected temporary warehouses and other structures; they were later assisted by an engineer regiment from North Carolina.

== Occupation ==
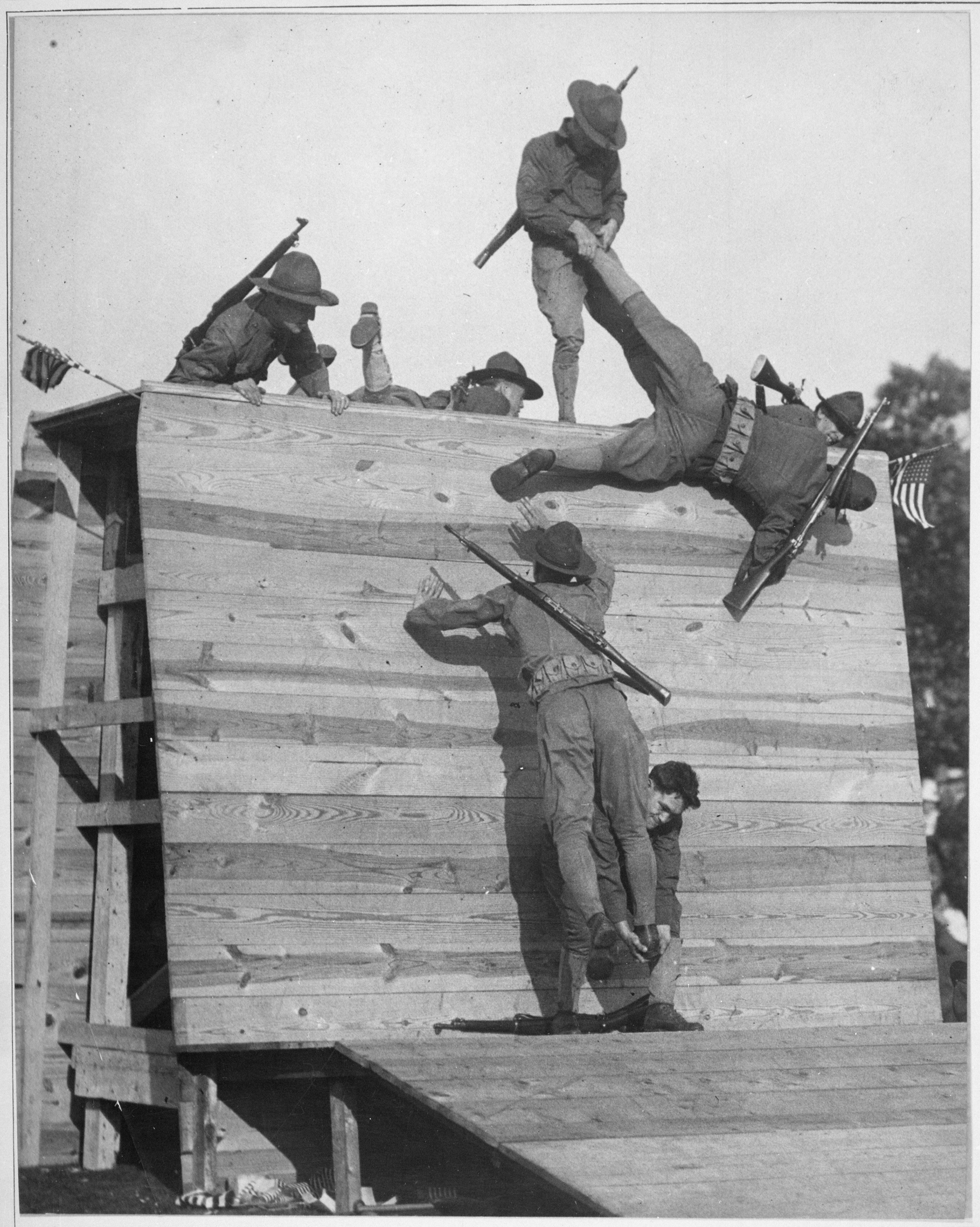
Scaling a climbing wall at Camp Wadsworth.

Occupation of the post began in August; all the units of the New York National Guard's 6th Division, later federalized as the 27th Division had assembled at Camp Wadsworth by the end of September, and trained there until departing for France in May 1918.

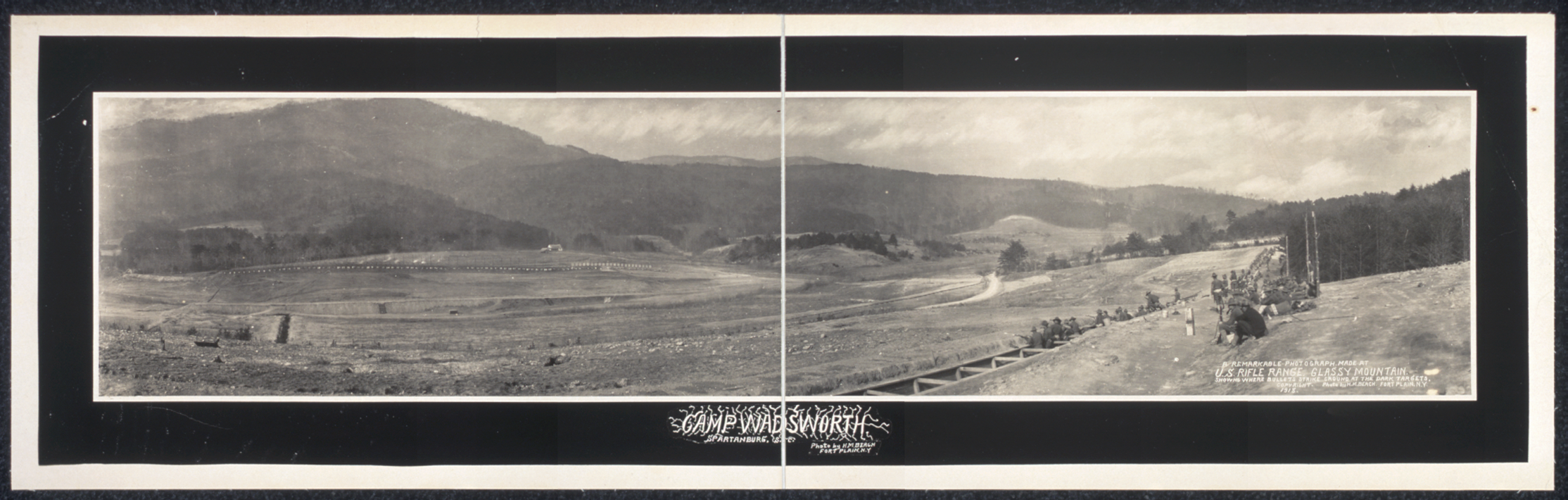
Rifle Range, Glassy Mountain, South Carolina.

Camp Wadsworth was used for individual training, including drill and ceremony and bayonet practice; it was also used for unit-level exercises that gave commanders and staff practice at planning and executing large scale maneuvers. In addition, the 27th Division created live fire ranges in the Glassy Mountain area of Greenville County, (Note: Map coordinates 35.13803393046529, -82.33281005217162), 26 miles from the main camp.) which served as the primary training sites for rifle, machine gun, and field artillery; these ranges permitted soldiers to gain the live fire experience required for service on the front lines.

The Camp Wadsworth cantonment also included facilities for improving soldier welfare and morale, including YMCA and YWCA buildings which housed education and training programs, a post theater which featured live performances, and several gymnasiums and athletic fields.

== Units stationed at Camp Wadsworth ==
In addition to the 27th Division, Camp Wadsworth was the organization and training site for the 96th Division; the war ended before the 96th Division was completely organized and trained, and it demobilized at Camp Wadsworth in early 1919.

The 15th New York Infantry Regiment, a unit of African-American soldiers and white officers later federalized as the 369th Infantry Regiment, arrived at Camp Wadsworth to begin its training. Tension with the local population, who had been assured that no black soldiers would be sent to Camp Wadsworth, caused the Army to rapidly transport the 369th to France to complete its organization and training. The 369th Infantry was assigned to the 93rd Division, an organization made up of other African-American units like the 369th; the 93rd Division's regiments served in combat after being integrated into French Army brigades.

The Camp Wadsworth garrison consisted of several specialty units, including military police, construction workers, cooks and bakers, and a remount depot.

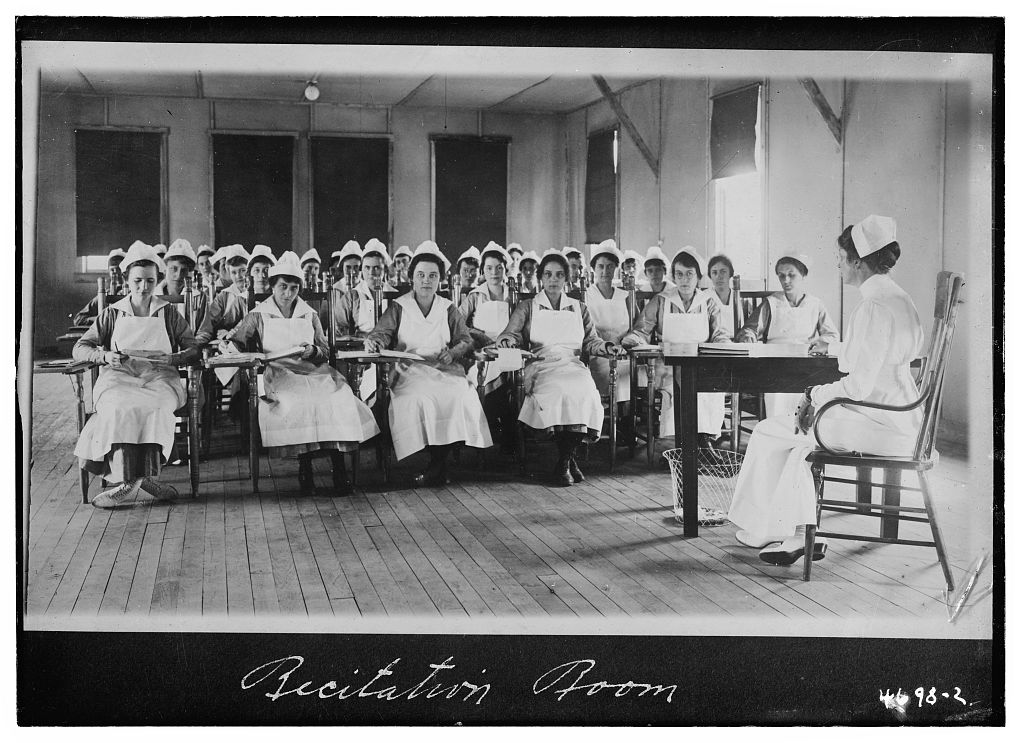
Recitation room, Army School of Nursing, Camp Wadsworth, South Carolina.

Several non-divisional units also organized and trained at Camp Wadsworth, including anti-aircraft machine gun battalions, signal battalions, corps artillery parks, and pioneer infantry regiments. There were also several military schools on the base, including one for training nurses.

Camp Wadsworth was also the organization and training site of the Slavic Legion; intended as a regiment of non-naturalized volunteers from countries in the Balkans, the unit was only partially organized when the end of the war ended the requirement for more soldiers in Europe, and the proposed unit was demobilized at Camp Wadsworth after the Armistice.

== Inactivation ==
Beginning in February 1919, the War Department carried out salvage operations at Camp Wadsworth, and reallocated usable equipment and materials to posts which remained open. Several buildings were sold and moved to other locations by the purchasers.

Most of the area which included Camp Wadsworth is now within the Spartanburg city limits, and has been developed as the Wadsworth Hills residential neighborhood.

== Association with prominent individuals ==
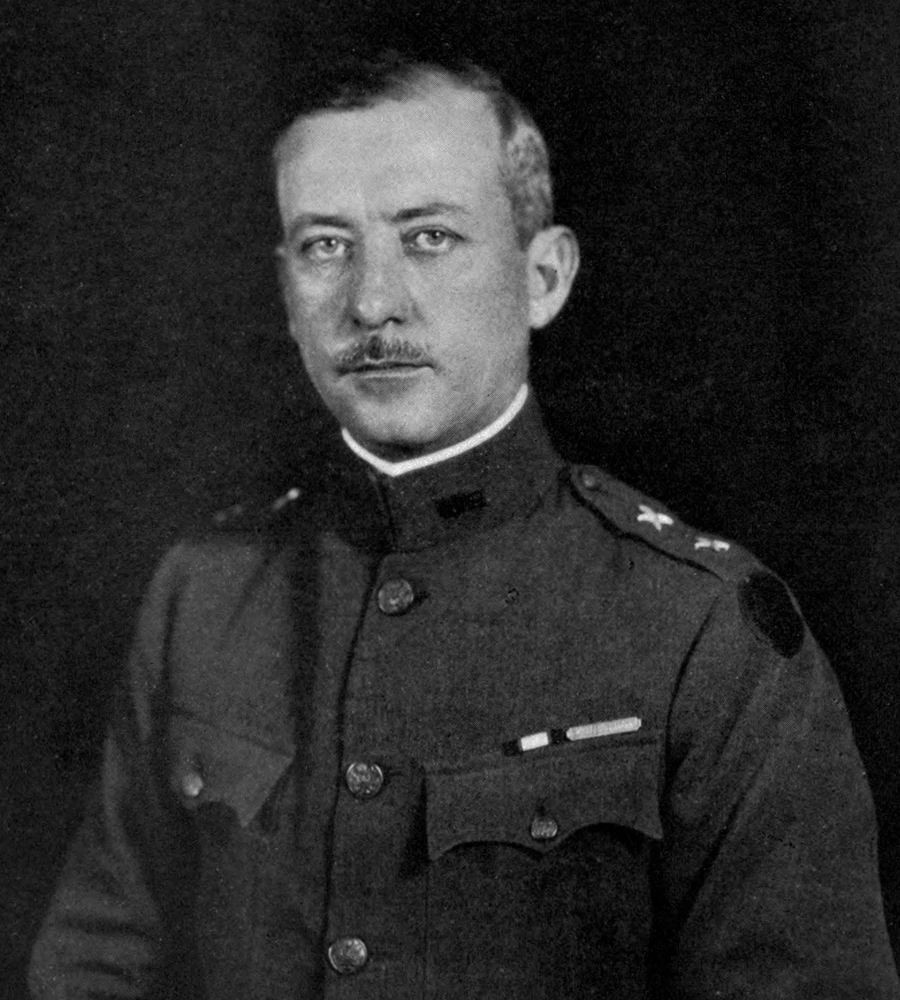
Major General John F. O'Ryan, commander of Camp Wadsworth and the 27th Division during World War I.

- Guy Carleton, commander of Camp Wadsworth and the 96th Division
- Frederick Detrick, Army doctor who was stationed at the Camp Wadsworth hospital
- James Reese Europe, musician, officer in the 15th New York Infantry (later the 369th Infantry), and leader of the regimental band
- Hamilton Fish, officer in the 15th New York Infantry (later the 369th Infantry) who was a longtime member of the United States House of Representatives from New York
- Ginger Fraser, Maine athlete and coach who served in the 56th Pioneer Infantry Regiment (formerly the 1st Maine Heavy Artillery)
- Ernest Willard Gibson, United States Senator from Vermont who served in the 57th Pioneer Infantry (formerly the 1st Vermont Infantry)
- Henry Johnson, soldier in the 369th Infantry who received the Medal of Honor
- Robert Michie, commander of the 27th Division's 53rd Brigade
- Don O. Newland, film director; served in a Camp Wadsworth development battalion, one of the units designed to provide education and training opportunities to soldiers during their off duty hours. Also served in the 58th Pioneer Infantry.
- John F. O'Ryan, commander of Camp Wadsworth and the 27th Division
- Loren R. Pierce, attorney and politician who served as Speaker of the Vermont House of Representatives; assigned to the 52nd Pioneer Infantry at Camp Wadsworth
- Needham Roberts, 369th Infantry soldier who was involved in the same action as Henry Johnson, and received the French Croix de Guerre
- Edward Streeter, novelist who served in the 27th Division
- Cornelius Vanderbilt III, officer in the 22nd New York Engineers

== Sources ==
=== Internet ===
- The African American Registry (2013). "The Harlem Hell Fighters Commissioned". aaregistry.org. Minneapolis MN: The African American Registry: A Non-Profit Education Organization. Archived from the original on 2017-04-21.
- Brooke, Jonathan (2006). "Tent and Trench: A Web Site Dedicated to the Memory of Camp Wadsworth, Spartanburg SC". schistory.net. Spartanburg, SC: Spartanburg County Historical Association.
- Hatchette, Charles (2016). "Wadsworth Hills: Active Westside neighborhood set among rolling hills". cityofspartanburg.org. Spartanburg, SC: City of Spartanburg, South Carolina.

=== Books ===
- Covert, Norman M. (1993). Cutting Edge: A History of Fort Detrick, Maryland, 1943-1993. Fort Detrick, MD: Headquarters, US Army Garrison, Fort Detrick.
- Fifth Company Records Committee (1922). The War Record of the Fifth Company, New England Regiment, Second Plattsburg Training Camp. Cambridge, Massachusetts: Harvard University Press.
- Ford, Nancy Gentile (2001). Americans All!: Foreign-born Soldiers in World War I. College Station, TX: Texas A&M University Press. ISBN 978-1-60344-132-2.
- Lanning, Michael Lee (2004). The African-American Soldier: From Crispus Attucks to Colin Powell. New York, NY: Citadel Press. ISBN 978-0-8065-2629-4.
- O'Ryan, John F. (1921). The Story of the 27th Division. Vol. 1. New York, NY: Wynkoop Hallenbeck Crawford Co.
- Reef, Catherine (2004). African Americans in the Military. New York, NY: Facts on File, Inc. ISBN 9781438107752.
- Rinaldi, Richard A. (2005). The US Army In World War I: Orders Of Battle; Ground Units, 1917-1919. Takoma Park, MD: General Data LLC. ISBN 978-0-9720296-4-3.
- United States Army Office of the Quartermaster General (May 12, 1951). "Headstone Applications for Military Veterans, 1925-1963, entry for Don Newland". Ancestry.com. Provo, UT: Ancestry.com LLC.
- United States Army War College Historical Section (1949). Order of Battle of the United States Land Forces in the World War. Washington, DC: United States Army.
- Willis, Jeffrey R. (1999). Postcard History Series: Spartanburg, South Carolina. Charleston, SC: Arcadia Publishing. ISBN 978-0-7385-0294-6.

=== Newspapers ===
- Brooklyn Eagle Staff (June 23, 1918). "Official Wadsworth Orders". Brooklyn Daily Eagle. Brooklyn, NY. p. 7.
- Thoms, Susan (February 26, 2012). "During WWI, Camp Wadsworth Brought the World to Spartanburg". Spartanburg Herald-Journal. Spartanburg, SC.

=== Magazines ===
- Gibson, Ernest W. (1920). "History of First Vermont and 57th Pioneer Infantry". Vermont Public Documents for the Two Years Ending June 30, 1920. Rutland, VT: The Tuttle Company.
- The Bookman staff (1918). "Chronicle and Comment: Dere Mable: Love Letters of a Rookie". The Bookman. Vol. XLVII. New York, NY: Dodd, Mead and Company.
