= Slavic Legion =

Short-lived unit of the United States Army

- Active: 1918
- Country: United States
- Branch: United States Army
- Size: 25,000 (authorized); 130 (actual)
- Garrison/HQ: Camp Wadsworth; Spartanburg, South Carolina

The Slavic Legion was a short-lived unit of the United States Army recruited among non-citizen United States residents of Slavic ethnicity during World War I.

In July 1918, approximately seven months after the United States declaration of war on Austria-Hungary, the United States Congress enacted legislation permitting the organization of the Slavic Legion. The move to create a Slavic Legion was largely due to the lobbying efforts of the Ukrainian Athletic Association, a group of Ukrainian immigrants who imagined the force – in the post-war era – could be used as the nucleus of a Ukrainian nationalist army. (Note: The Ukrainian Athletic Association was avowedly anti-communist, while Ukraine was - in 1918 - governed by the Ukrainian People's Republic.)

Following enactment of the authorizing legislation, the United States Department of War drew up regulations for the disciplining of the force, which was to have a strength of 25,000 men organized in Ukrainian, Czech, Slovak, and Polish components, with personnel to be trained at Camp Wadsworth. Officers of the Slavic Legion were expected to be fluent in both English and a Slavic language that corresponded to that spoken by the men under their command. Equipment and organization of the Slavic Legion was to be along U.S. Army lines, with no other difference apart from, according to the New York Times, "men of the same race ... put together".

Recruitment rallies within the Ukrainian-American community organized by the Ukrainian Athletic Association were largely a failure. Recruitment was further stymied due to a provision in the law that prevented enlistment of Slavic men residing in coalmining areas, due to the criticality of coal for the war effort. By November 1918, the Slavic Legion had enlisted just 114 men and commissioned 16 officers. The Armistice of 11 November 1918 ended the purpose of the Slavic Legion and the project was shelved.

== See also ==
- Army Slavic
- Czechoslovak Legion
