= 16th Division (United States) =

- Active: August 1918 – March 1919
- Country: United States
- Branch: United States Army
- Type: Infantry
- Size: Division

Commanders
- Commander: Maj. Gen. David C. Shanks
- Chief of Staff: Stephen J. Chamberlin

The 16th Division was an infantry division of the United States Army raised during World War I. It was the second formation of that name raised in the United States, the first being renamed to 37th Division in 1917.

== History ==
The 16th Division was part of a group of six divisions (15th-20th) that the War Department directed to be formed in mid-1918 from troops of the Regular Army augmented by draftees. It was anticipated that the divisions' training would take four months, to be completed by the end of November 1918.

Formation of the division began in August 1918 with the concentration of the 21st and 32nd Infantry Regiments and 301st and 302nd Cavalry Regiments at Camp Kearny, San Diego County, California. The division was commanded by Major General David C. Shanks, with his son-in-law Stephen J. Chamberlin, later a lieutenant general, as chief of staff. Its two Infantry brigades, the 31st and 32nd, were commanded by Peter Weimer Davison and Walter Cowen Short. The division's 16th Field Artillery Brigade was commanded by Daniel W. Hand. On 31 August, the strength of the division was approximately 6,900 officers and men, and, at the end of September, it reached a total of about 10,750 officers and men. During October and November, the strength was slightly above 12,000, the majority of drafted men being supplied by the western states. Systematic training began in September, with the 216th Engineers joining the division at Camp Kearny in October. The Armistice occurred before the 16th Division departed for France; under the command of Guy Carleton, it was briefly considered for inclusion in American Expeditionary Force Siberia, but that conflict also ended before the division could embark. On 17 January 1919, demobilization of emergency personnel and of all units, except the 21st and 32nd Infantry, was ordered. Demobilization of the division was accomplished by 8 March 1919.

=== Order of battle ===
- Headquarters, 16th Division
- 31st Infantry Brigade (organized September 1918 at Camp Kearny)
  - 21st Infantry Regiment (organized 1862; stationed on Mexican border as of April 1917)
  - 81st Infantry Regiment (organized September 1918 at Camp Kearny with cadre from the 21st Infantry)
  - 47th Machine Gun Battalion (organized September 1918 at Camp Kearny)
- 32nd Infantry Brigade (organized September 1918 at Camp Kearny)
  - 32nd Infantry Regiment (organized August 1916 in the Hawaiian Islands)
  - 82nd Infantry Regiment (organized September 1918 at Camp Kearny with cadre from the 32nd Infantry)
  - 48th Machine Gun Battalion (organized September 1918 at Camp Kearny)
- 16th Field Artillery Brigade (headquarters organized September 1918 at Camp Kearny)
  - 46th Field Artillery (organized August 1918 at Camp Kearny from 301st Cavalry)
  - 47th Field Artillery (organized August 1918 at Camp Kearny from 301st Cavalry)
  - 48th Field Artillery (organized August 1918 at Camp Kearny from 302nd Cavalry)
  - 16th Trench Mortar Battery (organized August 1918 at Camp Kearny from Machine Gun Troop, 302nd Cavalry)
- 46th Machine Gun Battalion (never organized)
- 216th Engineer Regiment (organized September 1918 at Camp A.A. Humphreys, Virginia)
- 216th Field Signal Battalion (organized August 1918 at Camp Kearny)
- Headquarters Troop, 16th Division (organized August 1918 at Camp Kearny)
- 16th Train Headquarters and Military Police (organized September 1918 at Camp Kearny)
  - 16th Ammunition Train (organized September 1918 at Camp Kearny)
  - 16th Engineer Train (never organized)
  - 16th Supply Train (organized September 1918 at Camp Kearny)
  - 16th Sanitary Train (organized August 1918 at Camp Kearny)
    - 261st-264th Ambulance Companies and Field Hospitals

=== Shoulder sleeve insignia ===
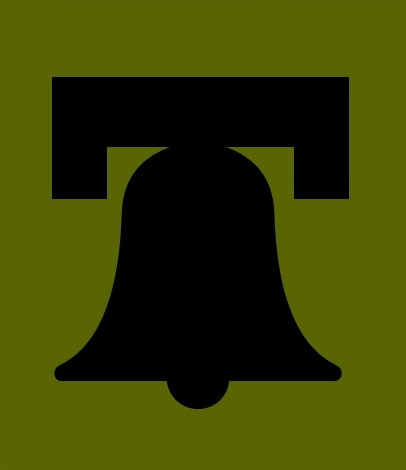
Reproduction of unofficial 16th Division shoulder patch, black on olive green

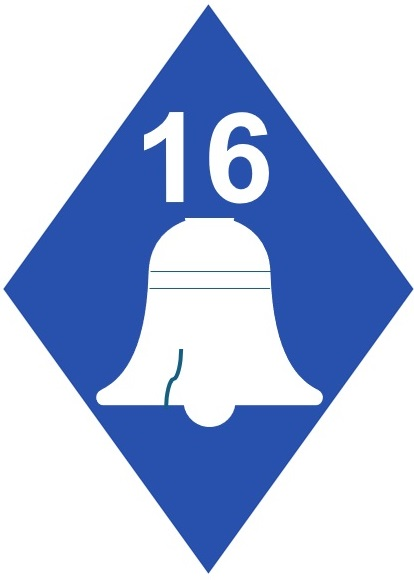
Reproduction of unofficial shoulder patch of 16th Division, blue and white

Because the 16th Division was in existence for such a brief period, it never officially designed or adopted a shoulder sleeve insignia or distinctive unit insignia. However, some members of the organization devised a felt shoulder patch that featured the Liberty Bell, one with the number "16" superimposed on it; neither insignia was ever officially adopted.
