= David C. Shanks =

U.S. Army major general

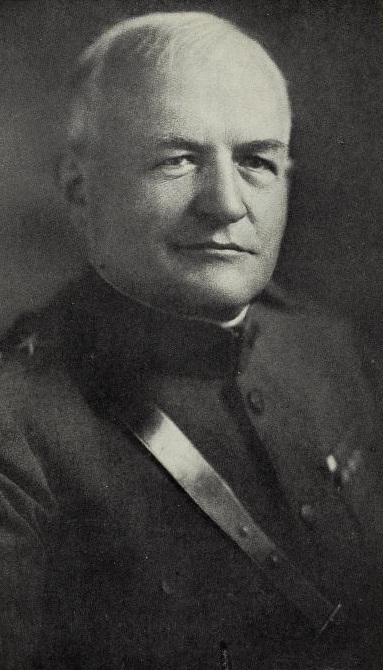
- From 1927's As They Passed Through the Port
- Born: April 6, 1861; Salem, Virginia, US
- Died: April 10, 1940 (aged 79); Washington, D.C., US
- Burial place: Arlington National Cemetery
- Spouse: Nancy Wright Chapman (m. 1893–1940, his death)
- Children: 2
- Relatives: Stephen J. Chamberlin (son-in-law)
- Military career
- Allegiance: United States
- Branch: United States Army
- Service years: 1884−1925
- Rank: Major General
- Service number: 0–28
- Unit: Infantry Branch
- Commands: Governor of Cavite; Hoboken Port of Embarkation; 16th Division; 5th Division; First Corps Area; Fort Dix; Fourth Corps Area
- Conflicts: Spanish–American War; Philippine–American War; World War I
- Awards: Army Distinguished Service Medal; Navy Distinguished Service Medal

David C. Shanks (April 6, 1861 – April 10, 1940) was a career officer in the United States Army. A graduate of the United States Military Academy, he attained the rank of major general, and was a veteran of the Spanish–American War, Philippine–American War, and World War I. He was most notable for his command of the Hoboken Port of Embarkation and 16th Division during the first World War, and was a recipient of the Army Distinguished Service Medal and Navy Distinguished Service Medal.

== Early life ==
David Cary Shanks Jr. (Note: His middle name sometimes appears in records and newspaper articles as "Carey".) was born in Salem, Virginia, on April 6, 1861, a son of David C. Shanks (1825–1900) and Sarah Medora (Boone) Shanks (1829–1914). The elder Shanks was an American Civil War veteran of the Confederate States Army and attained the rank of colonel.

The younger Shanks was educated in Salem and attended Roanoke College, from which he graduated in 1879. He then attended the United States Military Academy, from which he graduated in 1884 ranked 33rd of 37.

== Early career ==
Shanks was commissioned as a second lieutenant of Infantry. Assigned to the 18th Infantry Regiment, he served on frontier duty at Fort Maginnis, Montana, from 1884 to 1885 and Fort Gibson, Oklahoma, from 1885 to 1890. He was promoted to first lieutenant in 1890, and was the regimental adjutant at Fort Clark, Texas, from 1890 to 1894. From 1894 to 1898, Shanks served as professor of military science and tactics at Virginia Polytechnic Institute.

== Spanish–American War ==
At the start of the Spanish–American War, Shanks was assigned as mustering officer, quartermaster, and commissary in Richmond, Virginia. Responsible for organizing and training Virginia soldiers who joined the United States Volunteers, Shanks served in Richmond from May 1, 1898, to February 1, 1899. He was promoted to captain on April 26, 1898, and temporary Major in the 2nd Virginia Volunteer Infantry on June 1, 1898. He was mustered out of the volunteers on December 16, 1898, and returned to his permanent rank of captain.

== Philippine–American War ==
In early 1899, Shanks rejoined the 18th Infantry, which was assigned to the island of Panay during the Philippine–American War. Shanks served in the city of Iloilo and remained on duty in the Philippines until October 1901. From 1901 to 1903, he served with the 18th Infantry at Fort Douglas, Utah.

From April 1903 to July 1903, Shanks served as quartermaster of the 18th Infantry in Tacloban on the Philippine island of Leyte. From July 1903 to October 1905, Shanks served with the civil government of the Philippines as governor of the province of Cavite. He was promoted to major in the 4th Infantry on November 4, 1904.

== Continued career ==
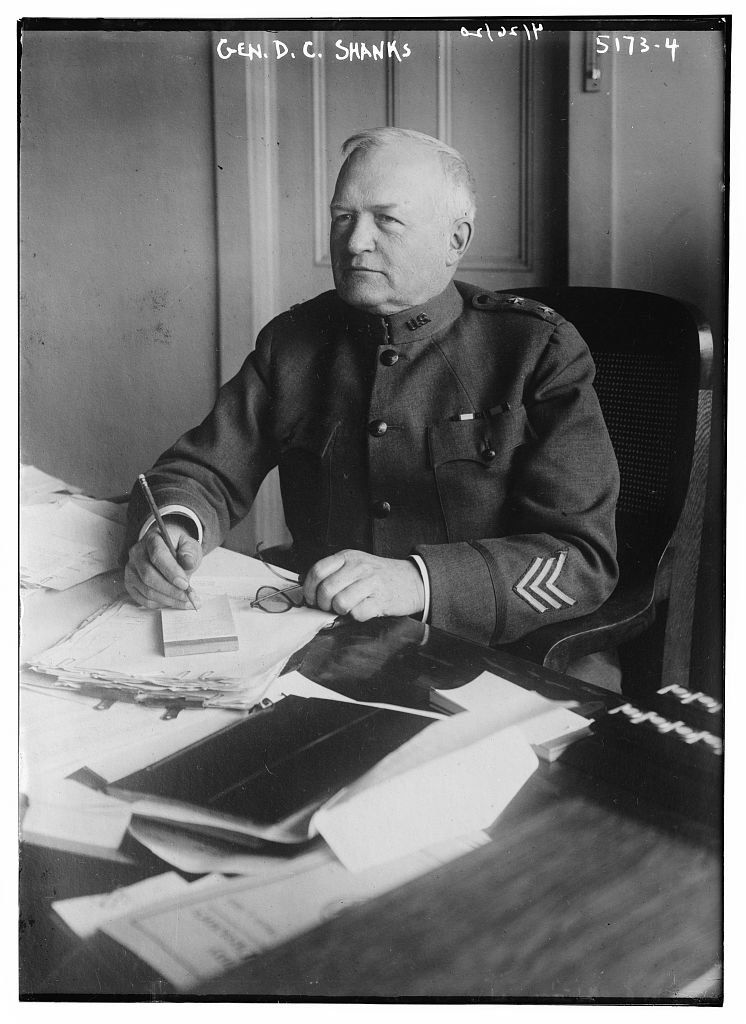
Shanks at work in 1920

Shanks served with the 4th Infantry at Fort Slocum, New York and Fort Mackenzie, Wyoming, from November 1905 to March 1908. He then returned to the Philippines with the 4th Infantry, and he served at Camp Jossman, Guimaras from March 1908 to July 1909. From August 1909 to June 1912 Shanks served on recruiting duty at Columbus Barracks, Ohio, and at Fort Logan, Colorado. On March 11, 1911, Shanks received promotion to lieutenant colonel. He served at Fort Thomas, Kentucky, from 1912 to 1913.

From January to March 1913, Shanks attended the School for Field Officers at Fort Leavenworth, Kansas. He was then detailed to the Inspector General's department, and served as inspector of the Western Department from April to September 1913. From September 1913 to September 1914, Shanks served in the office of the Inspector General of the Army. From August 1914 to August 1915, he was again assigned as inspector of the Western Department. He was promoted to colonel on August 4, 1914.

Shanks served as inspector of the Philippine Department from September 1915 to June 1917. He was promoted to brigadier general on May 15, 1917.

== World War I ==
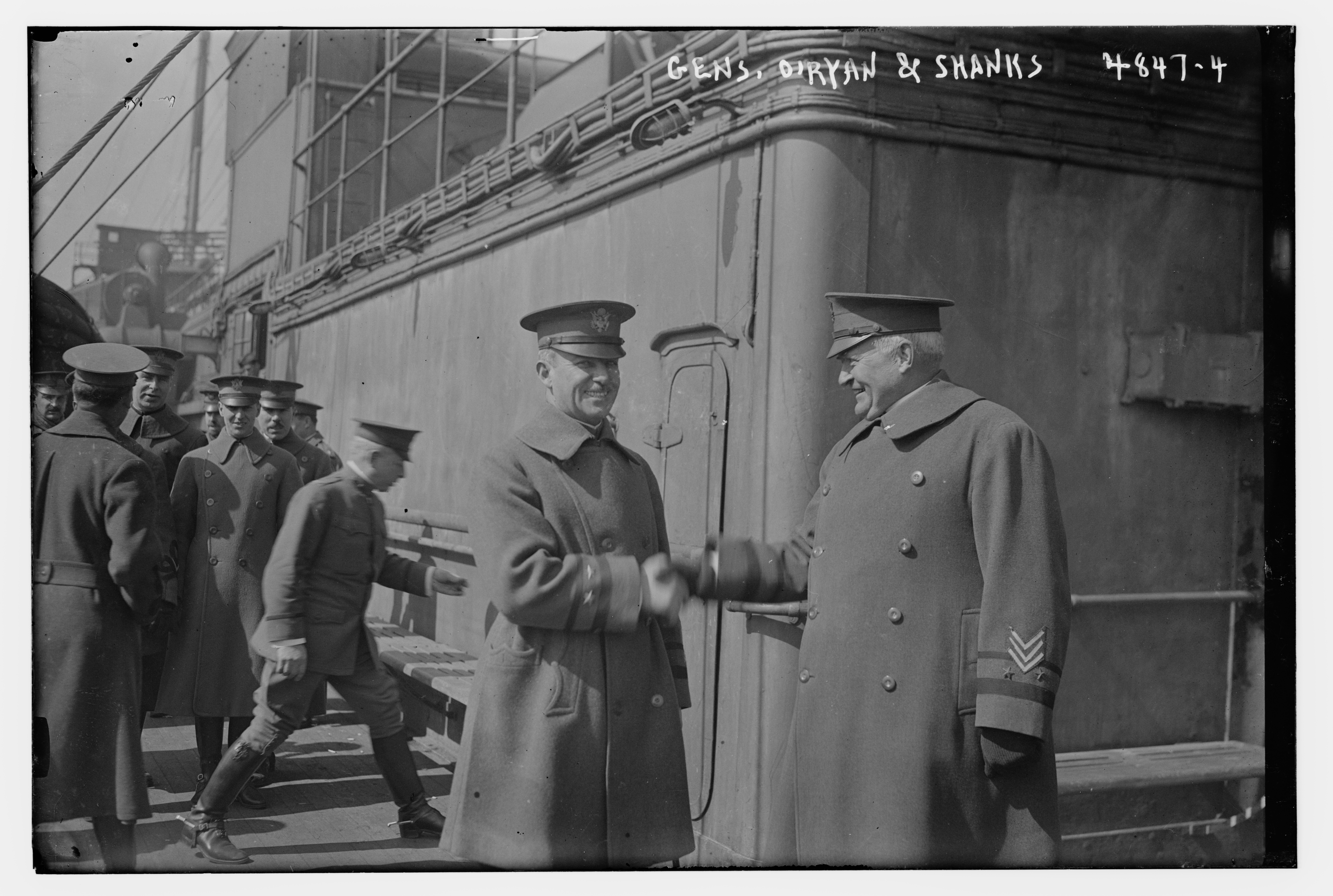
Generals John F. O'Ryan and Shanks meet at the Port of Hoboken during World War I

Upon returning to the United States, Shanks was assigned as commander of the Hoboken Port of Embarkation. Responsible to plan and execute transportation of Army soldiers and equipment to France, he served in this position from July 1917 to September 1918. In August 1917, Shanks was promoted to temporary major general.

Shanks left Hoboken to assume command of the 16th Division at Camp Kearny, California. He was still organizing and equipping his command when the war ended in November 1918, which resulted in the 16th Division's inactivation soon afterwards.

After the division was demobilized, Shanks returned to the Port of Hoboken, now a port of debarkation. He had responsibility for receiving soldiers and equipment returning from France and arranging for onward transportation, and held this command From December 1918 to April 1920. Shanks received both the Army Distinguished Service Medal and Navy Distinguished Service Medal to recognize his superior performance of duty during the war. The citation for his Army DSM reads:

The President of the United States of America, authorized by Act of Congress, July 9, 1918, takes pleasure in presenting the Army Distinguished Service Medal to Major General David Cary Shanks, United States Army, for exceptionally meritorious and distinguished services to the Government of the United States, in a duty of great responsibility during World War I, for services in the administration of the Port of Embarkation, Hoboken, New Jersey, in connection with the shipment of troops overseas.

The Navy DSM states the following:

The President of the United States of America takes pleasure in presenting the Navy Distinguished Service Medal to Major General David Cary Shanks, United States Army, for distinguished service in the line of his profession as Commanding General, Port of Embarkation, Hoboken, New Jersey. General Shanks inexhaustible energy, close co-operation with the Navy and excellent judgment in deciding questions of policy contributed greatly to the successful transportation of troops from the Port of Hoboken.

== Post-World War I ==
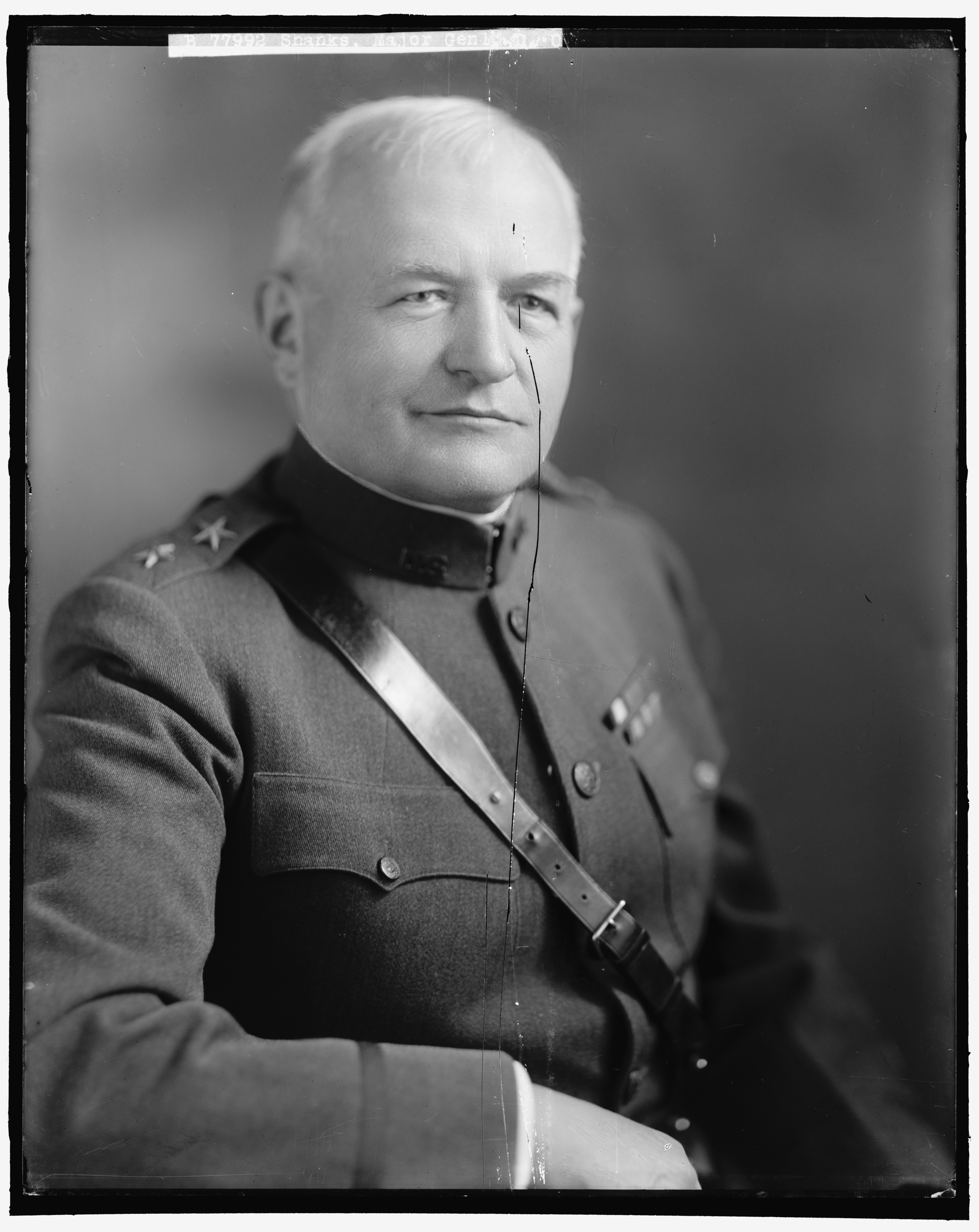
Shanks as a major general after World War I

In April 1920, Shanks was assigned to command the 5th Division at Camp Gordon, Georgia. He remained in command until August 1920, when he was assigned as commander of the First Corps Area in Boston, Massachusetts. He served in this command until September 1921, and was promoted to permanent major general in March 1921.

From July to November 1921, Shanks was assigned as commander of the 1st Division and Fort Dix, New Jersey. In November 1921, he was a pallbearer at the burial of the Unknown Soldier. From November 1921 to July 1922, he was president of the Army's Board for Examination, which determined which officers would be retained after World War I and at what rank.

Shanks commanded the Fourth Corps Area in Atlanta, Georgia, from July 1922 to November 1924. In August 1923, he was one of the pall bearers at the funeral of President Warren G. Harding.

== Retirement and death ==
In January 1925, Shanks retired as a major general and settled in Washington, D.C. A prolific writer, he authored numerous books and magazine articles, including: Management of the American Soldier (1918); As They Passed Through the Port (1927); "Golf Stories" (Golf Illustrated, November 1928); "Indian Territory Incidents" (National Sportsman, March, April, May, 1929); "Hunting Tales of the Old Army" (Forest and Stream, 1929); and Genealogy of the Shanks Family in America (1934).

Shanks died in Washington, D.C., on April 10, 1940. He was buried at Arlington National Cemetery.

== Legacy ==
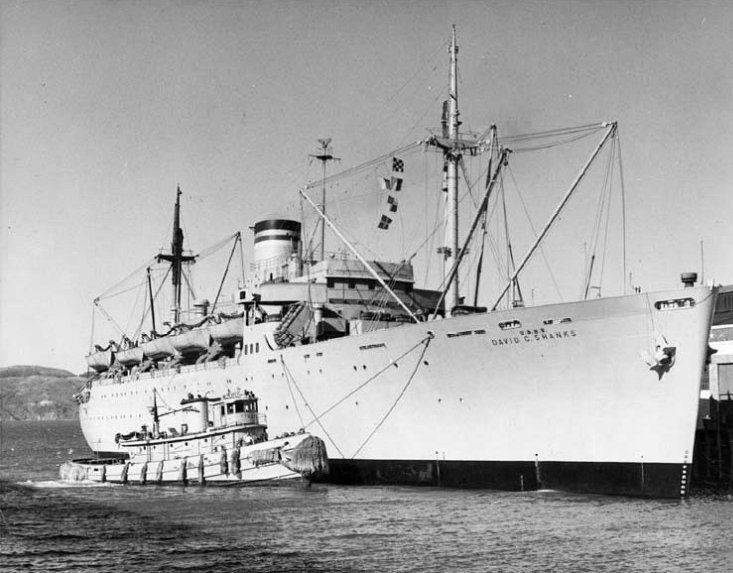
USNS David C. Shanks circa 1950

The USNS David C. Shanks (T-AP-180) was a U.S. military transport ship. Christened in 1943, Shanks was used to move soldiers and equipment during World War II and the Korean War. The ship was inactivated in 1959 and remained in the Reserve Fleet until being sold for scrap in 1973.

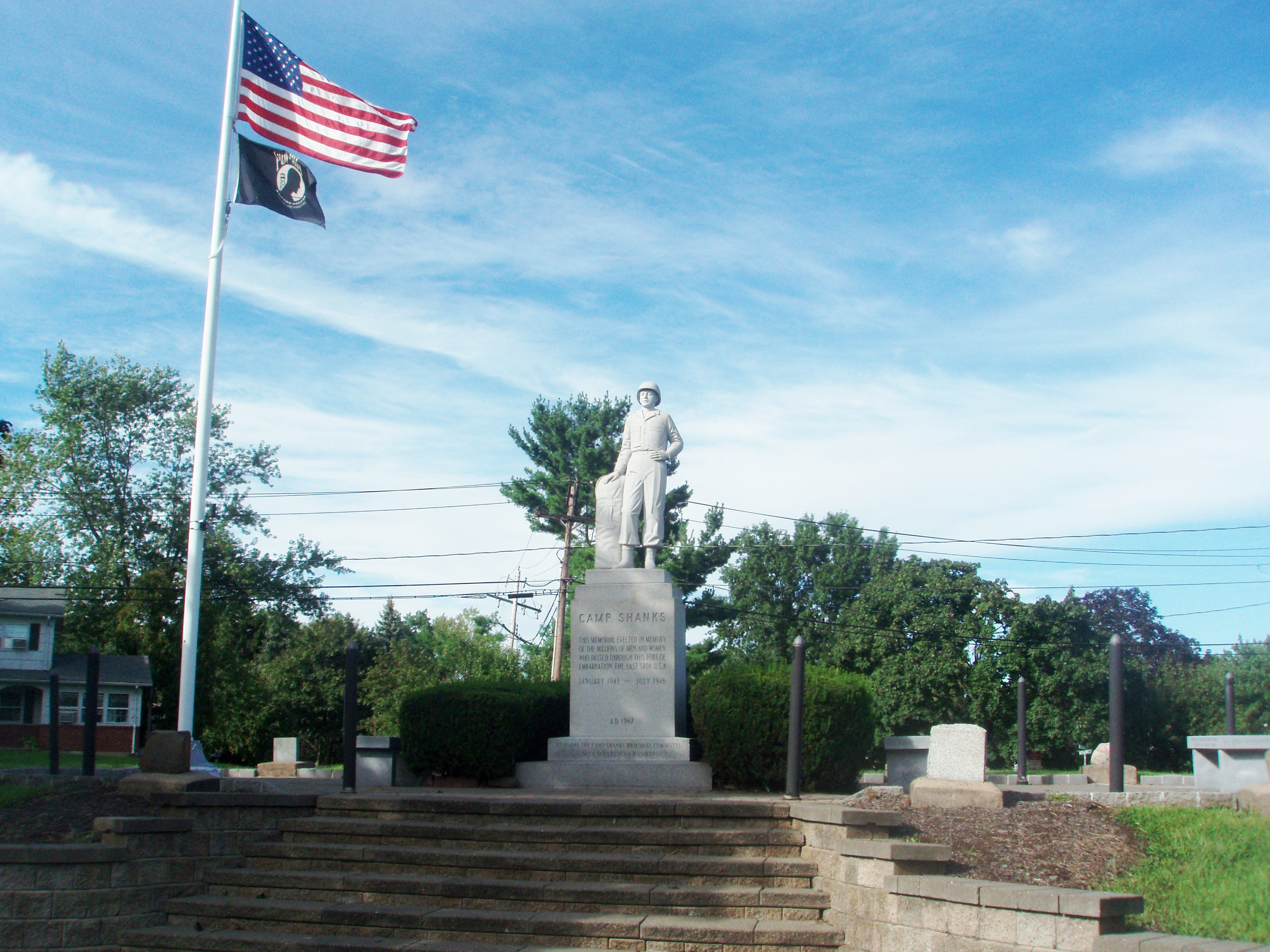
Orangetown, New York memorial commemorating Camp Shanks

During World War II, the Army established the Camp Shanks military post. Named for Shanks, it was located near Orangetown, New York, and used as an embarkation center for soldiers preparing to depart for service overseas. After the war, it was used as a processing center for prisoners of war who were returning to their home countries. Camp Shanks closed in 1946 and was used as housing for veterans until it was dismantled in 1954. Much of the site was later subsumed by construction of the Palisades Interstate Parkway and Tappan Zee Bridge. In June 1994, a museum to commemorate Camp Shanks opened in Orangetown.

In addition to his military awards, in 1921 Shanks received the honorary degree of LL.D. from Roanoke College.

== Family ==
In October 1893, Shanks married Nancy Wright Chapman (1868–1954). They were the parents of two daughters, Katherine (1894–1960), the wife of United States Navy Captain William E. Malloy, and Sarah (1896–1975), the wife of General Stephen J. Chamberlin.
