= Camp Zachary Taylor =

Military training camp in Louisville, Kentucky, USA

Coordinates: 38°11′44″N 85°42′56″W

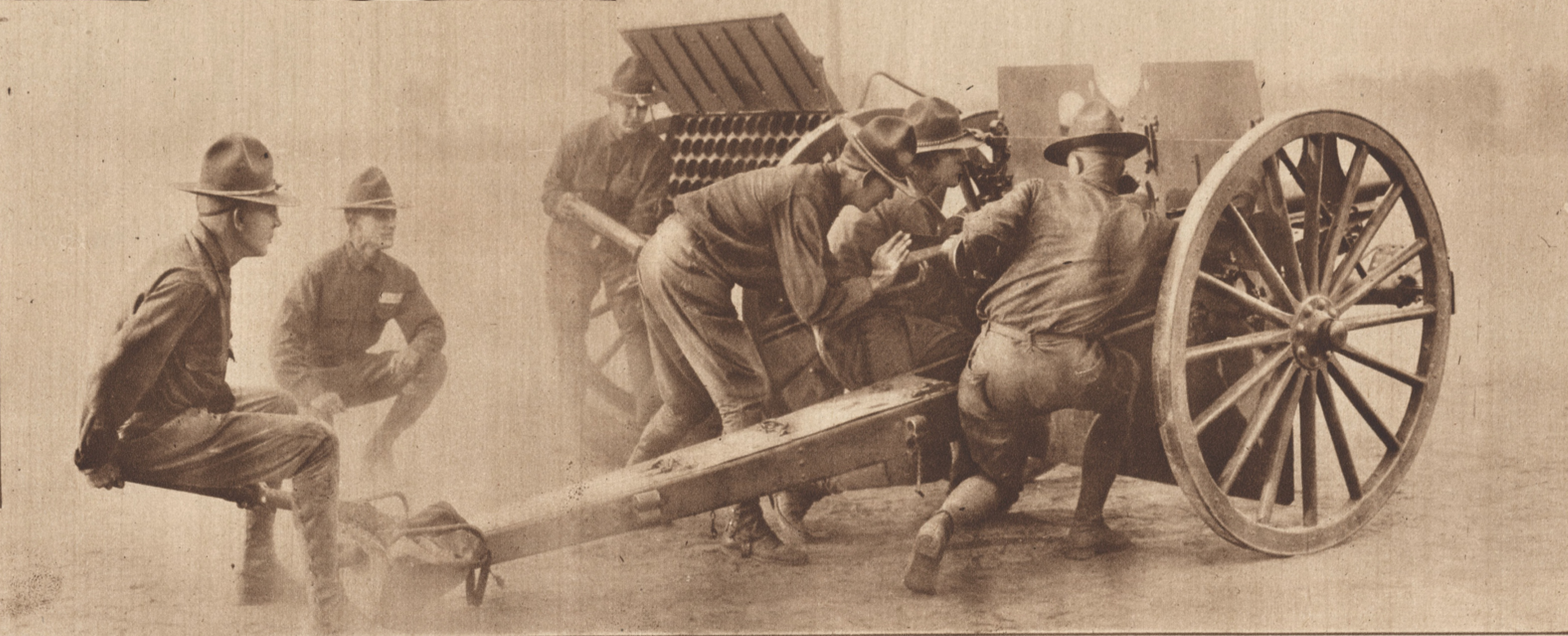
New York soldiers in a 1918 marksmanship competition at the Field Artillery Central Officers Training School, Camp Zachary Taylor

Camp Zachary Taylor was a military training camp in Louisville, Kentucky. It opened in 1917, to train soldiers for United States involvement in World War I, and was closed three years later. It was initially commanded by Guy Carleton and after the war its commanders included Julius Penn. Its name (and some of its buildings) live on as the Camp Taylor neighborhood of Louisville. It is named for Louisville resident and US president Zachary Taylor.

Trainees at the camp include novelist F. Scott Fitzgerald, actor Louis Wolheim, and Olympic sprint gold medalist Charley Paddock.

== Mobilization station ==
- 84th Division

== Demobilization station ==
- 1st Division September 1919
- 38th Division January 1919
- 84th Division July 1919

== See also ==
- Camp Taylor, Louisville
