= Stephen J. Chamberlin =

United States general

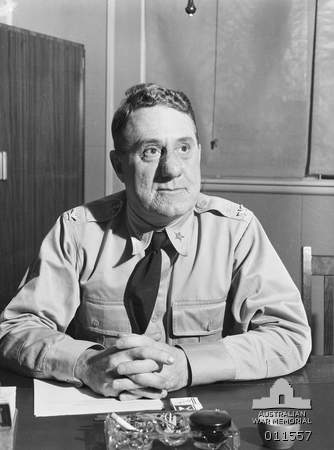
- Colonel Stephen J. Chamberlin, 1942
- Born: 23 December 1889; Spring Hill, Kansas
- Died: 23 October 1971 (aged 81); Newport Beach, California
- Military career
- Allegiance: United States
- Branch: United States Army
- Service years: 1912–1951
- Rank: Lieutenant General
- Service number: 0-3397
- Commands: Fifth United States Army
- Conflicts: World War I; World War II; Battle of Buna-Gona; Salamaua-Lae campaign; Finisterre Range campaign; Huon Peninsula campaign; Philippines campaign (1944–45); Borneo Campaign (1945); Occupation of Japan
- Awards: Navy Cross; Army Distinguished Service Medal (4); Silver Star; Distinguished Service Star (Philippines); Commander of the Order of the British Empire (Australia); Order of Military Merit, First Class (Chile); Grand Officer of the Order of the Nile (Egypt); Commander of the Order of the Crown with Palm (Belgium); Croix de Guerre with Palm (Belgium); Officer of the Legion of Honour (France); Grand Cross of the Order of the Phoenix (Greece); Grand Officer of the Order of Orange-Nassau with Swords (Netherlands)

Stephen Jones Chamberlin (23 December 1889 – 23 October 1971) was a lieutenant general in the United States Army who served during World War II as General of the Army Douglas MacArthur's Assistant Chief of Staff, G-3, the staff officer in charge of plans and operations.

Born in Spring Hill, Kansas on 23 December 1889, he was a 1912 graduate of the United States Military Academy at West Point, New York. During World War I, he was aide-de-camp to Major General David C. Shanks, the New York Port of Embarkation commander at Hoboken, New Jersey, for which he was one of twelve army officers who received the Navy Cross.

After the war, he attended the Command and General Staff School at Fort Leavenworth, Kansas, and served on the staff of the Chief of Infantry in the War Department. He attended the Army War College and was posted to the staff of the Army's Hawaiian Division at Fort Shafter, Hawaii, as Assistant Chief of Staff, G-3.

In 1938, he became assistant chief of the Construction Branch in the G-4 Division of War Department General Staff. He became involved in the vast construction program of arsenals, depots, airbases and coastal defenses as the United States rearmed prior to its entry into World War II.

In January 1942, he was sent to Australia, where he became Assistant Chief of Staff, G-3, at General MacArthur's General Headquarters (GHQ), Southwest Pacific Area. In this role, he was responsible for planning and overseeing the execution of MacArthur's major operations, including the New Guinea, Philippines and Borneo campaigns.

Chamberlin was director of the Intelligence Division, G-2, on the War Department General Staff from 1946 to 1948, when he became commander of the Fifth Army. He retired in September 1951, and was then employed as chief of security for the US Air Force's Arnold Engineering Development Center at Arnold Air Force Base, Tennessee. He died on 23 October 1971.

== Early life ==
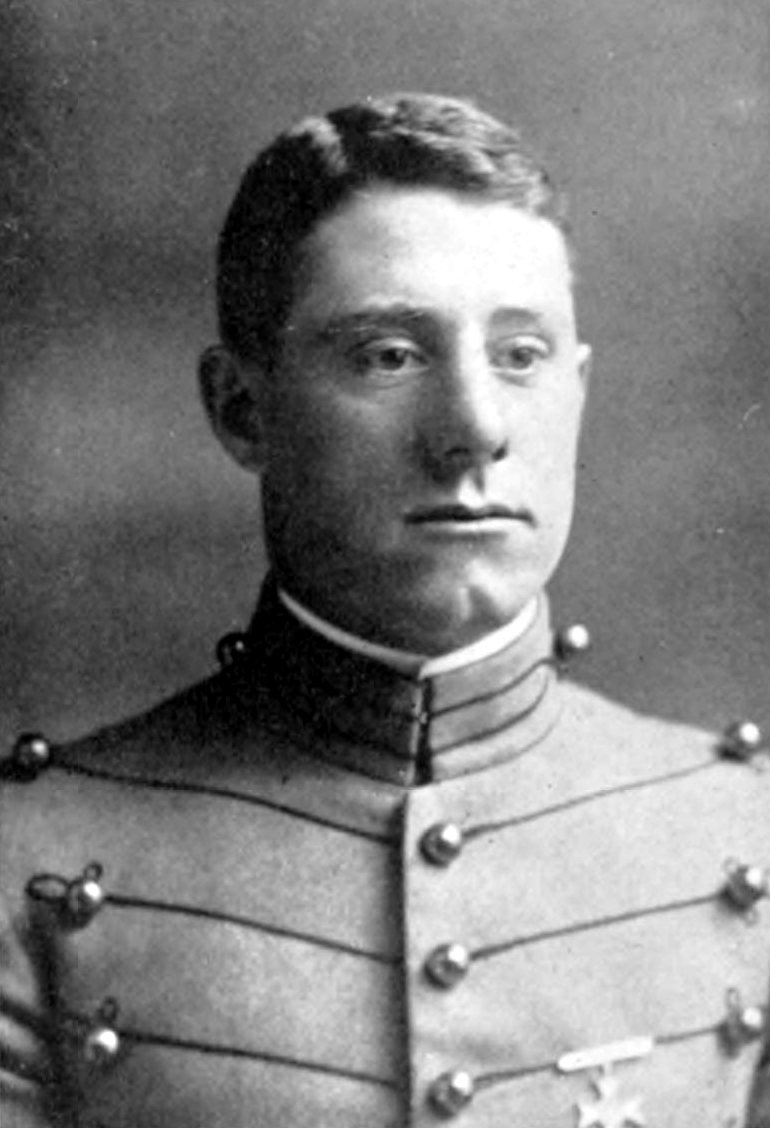
At West Point in 1912

Stephen Jones Chamberlin was born in Spring Hill, Kansas on 23 December 1889, the son of Clark and Minnie (Hare) Chamberlin. He was raised and educated in Spring Hill and graduated from Spring Hill High School in 1907. After graduation, he was appointed to the United States Military Academy at West Point, New York by U.S. Representative Charles Frederick Scott. He began attendance in 1908 and graduated in 1912 ranked 63rd of 95.

Chamberlin was commissioned a second lieutenant in the 16th Infantry, which was then stationed at the Presidio of San Francisco. In May 1914, the regiment moved to El Paso, Texas. He transferred to the 8th Infantry on 1 February 1915 and served at Fort William McKinley in the Philippines. He was promoted to first lieutenant on 1 July 1916, becoming a battalion adjutant on 14 October. He was assistant to the post quartermaster from 31 October 1916 to 1 January 1917, and then Post Exchange Officer from 20 December 1916 to 9 June 1917. He was promoted to captain on 15 May 1917, a few weeks after the American entry into World War I, and was acting regimental adjutant from 9 June to 1 September 1917.

== World War I ==
With the United States now involved in the war, Chamberlin became aide-de-camp to Major General David C. Shanks, the New York Port of Embarkation commander at Hoboken, New Jersey. Chamberlin was also the officer in charge of troop movements. On 2 March 1918, Chamberlin married Shank's daughter, Sarah Chapman, at St. Bartholomew's Episcopal Church, New York on the corner of Madison Avenue and East 44th Street, in a simple ceremony attended only by Sarah's sister Katherine and Captain Maxwell Sullivan as best man.

Chamberlin was promoted to major on 7 June 1918. For his "distinguished service in the line of his profession as dispatch officer at the Port of Embarkation, Hoboken, New Jersey", he became one of only twelve Army officers to receive the Navy Cross during World War I. He was also awarded the Distinguished Service Medal. His citation read:

The President of the United States takes pleasure in presenting the Army Distinguished Service Medal to Stephen J. Chamberlin, Major (Infantry), US Army, for exceptionally meritorious and distinguished services to the Government of the United States, in a duty of great responsibility during World War I. As Acting Dispatch Officer at Port of Embarkation, Hoboken, New Jersey, from November 15, 1917 to September 6, 1918, Major Chamberlin displayed marked ability in handling the movements of troops through the port, assigning units and detachments to camps, convoys, and ships, and by foresight, thorough organization, and hard work arranged for the smooth working of troop movements, prevented congestion at the camps and piers, thus enabling the transports to sail at the appointed time with the appropriate number of troops.

In September 1918, Shanks was appointed commander of the 16th Division at Camp Kearny, California, and Chamberlin was appointed the division's Assistant Chief of Staff. To prepare for the role, he attended a course at the Army War College. Following the Armistice with Germany in November 1918, he was sent on a tour of the battlefields in France and Belgium.

== Between the wars ==
In the aftermath of World War I, Chamberlin was reduced in rank to captain on 9 February 1919, but was promoted to major again on 1 July 1920. A year later he was posted to the Panama Canal Zone, initially as transportation officer, and then with 33rd Infantry. On returning to the United States in January 1922, he joined the staff of 19th Infantry Brigade at Fort McPherson, Georgia. He was transferred to the 22nd Infantry at Fort Benning, Georgia, on 17 February 1923.

From 1924 to 1925, he attended the Command and General Staff School at Fort Leavenworth, Kansas, graduating as an Honor Graduate. Duty then followed with the Third Corps Area from 30 June to 5 July 1925; with the National Guard at Staunton, Virginia from 5 July 1925 to 1 July 1926; in the Office Chief of Infantry at Washington, D.C.; and at Camp Perry, Ohio as Publicity Officer. He served on the staff of the Chief of Infantry in the War Department from 1926 to 1930, and then commanded a battalion of the 22nd Infantry from 1930 to 1932.

Chamberlin attended the Army War College from July 1932 to June 1933. Upon graduation, he was posted to the staff of the Army's Hawaiian Division at Fort Shafter, Hawaii, serving as Assistant Chief of Staff, G-3. After more than 15 years as a major, he was finally promoted to lieutenant colonel on 1 August 1935. On returning to the United States in July 1936, he became assistant professor of Military Science and Tactics for the high schools of Los Angeles.

== World War II ==
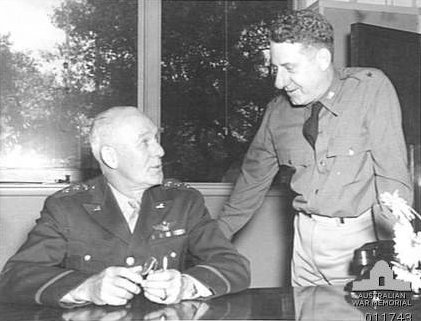
Lieutenant General George H. Brett (left) with Chamberlin

In 1938, Chamberlin became Assistant Chief of the Construction Branch in the G-4 Division of War Department General Staff. At this time, the United States was embarking on a military buildup in response to a worsening international situation, which culminated in the outbreak of World War II on 1 September 1939. A major component of this build up was a vast construction program of arsenals, depots, airbases and coastal defenses. Some $175 million was allocated to construction under the Expansion Program, as it became known.

On 7 May 1940, the Assistant Chief of Staff, G-4, Major General Richard C. Moore, G-4 of the War Department General Staff, asked for an estimate of the cost to house an additional 1,200,000 men and balked at the estimate he received of $800 per head. To save on the cost of cantonments, Moore decided not to paint them. Chamberlin disagreed on the grounds that paint would reduce maintenance costs. President Franklin Roosevelt intervened and directed that the buildings be painted. As a result, an order was placed for 96,500 US gallons (365,000 L; 80,400 imp gal) of paint, resulting in an $11 million budget shortfall. Chamberlin was promoted to colonel on 14 February 1941. Commenting after the war on the construction program, he wrote:

Actually a phenomenal standard was set, one in which all Americans can glory. As far as wasting a few dollars was concerned, the construction effort cannot hold a candle to Lend-Lease, the Marshall Plan, or the Military Assistance Program. Had it not been for the courageous performance of those in charge of the War Department in the emergency, we might well have been defeated, and how then would the expenditure of a few millions have loomed in the long-range picture?

In January 1942, Chamberlin was appointed Assistant Chief of Staff, G-4, of US Army Forces in Australia, arriving by air from Washington, D.C., on 9 January. He soon became Chief of Staff of US Army Forces in Australia, first under Major General Julian F. Barnes, and then under his successor, Lieutenant General George H. Brett. Chamberlin was promoted to brigadier general on 15 February 1942. General Douglas MacArthur arrived in Australia on 17 March to become Supreme Commander of the newly established Southwest Pacific Area (SWPA), which now included the US Army Forces in Australia. On 19 April, MacArthur formally established his General Headquarters (GHQ), and Chamberlin was appointed its Assistant Chief of Staff, G-3.

As G-3, Chamberlin was one of the most highly rated members of the GHQ staff, although not being part of the "Bataan Gang" – the group of officers who had escaped with MacArthur from the Philippines – made him something of an outsider at GHQ. Chamberlin was responsible for planning and overseeing the execution of MacArthur's major operations, including the New Guinea, Philippines and Borneo campaigns. One member of the staff later recalled:

Chamberlin, G-3, was an outstanding staff planner: quiet, unassuming, methodical, determined, aggressive in defending his position when challenged. He had a fine sense of timing and integration. He manipulated his three separate planning teams to move down parallel paths toward the same objective, or, when necessary, to move along divergent paths to map out a change of direction. Once an objective had been defined in long-run terms, Chamberlin and his planners set the basic sequence of events. All major commanders participated in the planning process, with Chamberlin coordinating and adjusting to smooth out conflicts. Considering the huge distances involved and the necessity for working in the humid heat of equatorial islands, the performance was stupendous. The apparent ease that characterized the operations reflected the thoroughness of the planning process. On those occasions when MacArthur required a sudden and pressing shift of direction, Chamberlin delivered, not always with great patience. The deadlines were met with a finely turned operational plan.

Chamberlin jealously guarded his position. In late 1943, Chamberlin differed with one of his planners, Brigadier General Bonner Fellers, over a proposed landing at Hansa Bay. Fellers thought that Hansa Bay could be bypassed, but Chamberlin felt that this would be too risky. While Fellers was a newcomer to GHQ, he had known MacArthur for many years, and Fellers took his proposal directly to MacArthur, who approved it. A furious Chamberlin had Fellers fired from G-3. MacArthur made him his military secretary.

One of Chamberlin's challenges was working with the Australians. Their decentralized mode of planning was entirely different from the top-down approach used by GHQ, and Chamberlin found this a source of frustration, as it was difficult to extract information from them. Nonetheless, he established a good working relationship with the Australian Deputy Chief of the General Staff, Lieutenant General Frank Berryman.

When MacArthur began looking for a new chief of staff to replace Lieutenant General Richard K. Sutherland in 1945, he considered but rejected giving the post to Chamberlin. Chamberlin became Deputy Chief of Staff in February 1946, and was briefly acting as chief of staff from 2 May to 10 June 1946. For his services in the Southwest Pacific and the Occupation of Japan, Chamberlin was awarded three Army Distinguished Service Medals and the Silver Star. In September 1946, he was one of five American major generals who was made an honorary Commander of Order of the British Empire in the Military Division for his work with US Army Forces in Australia and GHQ SWPA.

== Later life ==
From June 1946 to October 1948 Chamberlin was director of the Intelligence Division, G-2, on the War Department General Staff. He commanded the Fifth Army from 1948 to 1951, receiving promotion to lieutenant general on 24 January 1948. In 1949, he was chairman of a general officer committee which researched the role of race in the Army, and produced a report favoring the continuation of segregation and the maintenance of a quota limiting the number of African Americans who could serve in uniform.

He retired in September 1951, and was then employed as chief of security for the US Air Force's Arnold Engineering Development Center at Arnold Air Force Base, Tennessee. He died at Hoag Memorial Hospital in Newport Beach, Orange, California on 23 October 1971. He was buried in Section 3, Site 1968 A WH of Arlington National Cemetery. His wife Sarah was subsequently interred with him in 1975. His papers are in the US Army Heritage and Education Center in Carlisle, Pennsylvania.

== Awards ==

1st Row	Navy Cross		Distinguished Service Medal with three oak leaf clusters	Silver Star
2nd Row	World War I Victory Medal	American Defense Service Medal	Asiatic-Pacific Campaign Medal	World War II Victory Medal
3rd Row	Army of Occupation Medal	National Defense Service Medal	Philippine Liberation Medal	Distinguished Service Star (Philippines)
4th Row	Commander of the Order of the British Empire; Military Ribbon (Australia)	Order of Military Merit; First Class (Chile)	Order of the Nile; Grand Officer (Egypt)	Commander of the Order of the Crown with Golden Palm (Belgium)
5th Row	Croix de Guerre (Belgium)	Legion of Honour; Grand Officer (France)	Grand Cross of the Order of the Phoenix (Greece)	Grand Officer of the Order of Orange-Nassau with Swords (Netherlands)
