= Camp Taylor, Louisville =

Neighborhood in Louisville, Kentucky, United States of America

Coordinates: 38.19560°N 85.71550°W

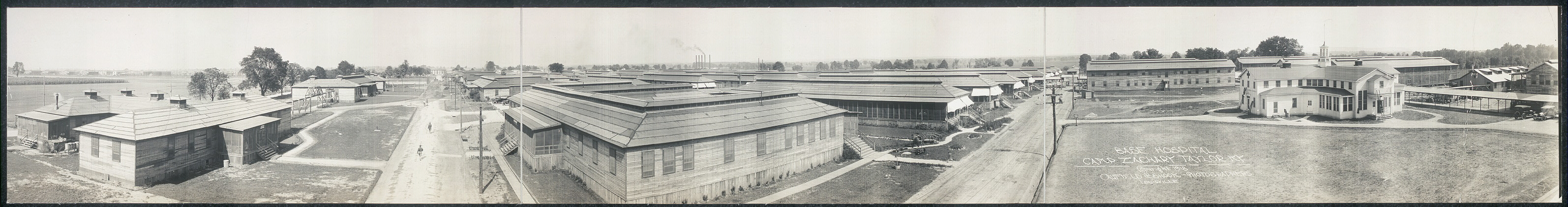
Panorama view of Camp Zachary Taylor circa 1918

Camp Taylor is a neighborhood and former military base six miles southeast of downtown Louisville, Kentucky, United States. First announced on June 11, 1917, it was originally a military camp named for former president Zachary Taylor. For a time it was America's largest military training camp, housing 47,500 men at one time, and spurred development in an area that was previously dominated by farmland.

Most of the camp was dismantled after World War I and a residential neighborhood emerged, composed mostly of small bungalow and Cape Cod homes, many built or purchased by soldiers returning from the war. Many of these buildings were built from lumber and other materials from the dismantled military buildings. The working class community was annexed by Louisville in 1950.

F. Scott Fitzgerald was stationed at Camp Taylor and mentions it in his novel The Great Gatsby.

Bellarmine University is built on part of the location of the former Camp Taylor.

== Demographics ==
In the 2000 census, the population of Camp Taylor was 1,402, of which 94.3% are white, 3.6% are listed as other, 1.9% are black, and 0.2% are Hispanic. College graduates are 10.9% of the population, people without a high school degree are 27.3%. Females outnumber males 54.9% to 45.1%.

== See also ==
- Camp Zachary Taylor
