= African-American history =

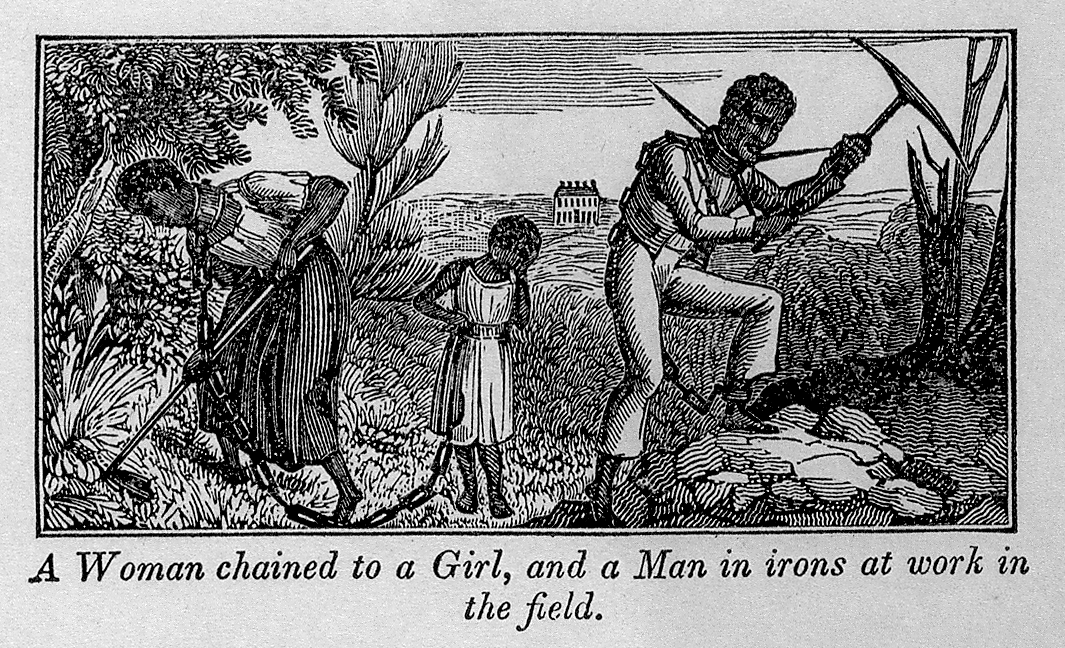
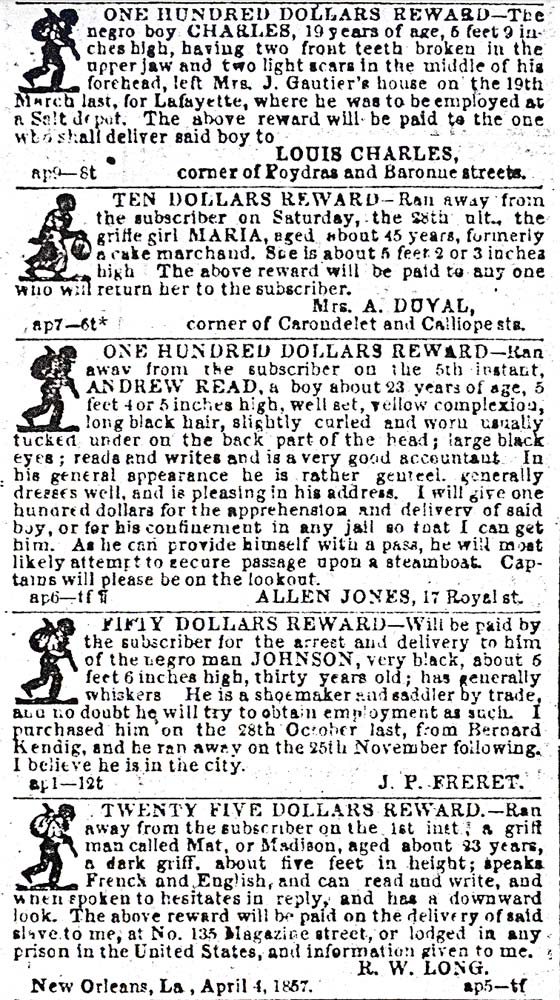
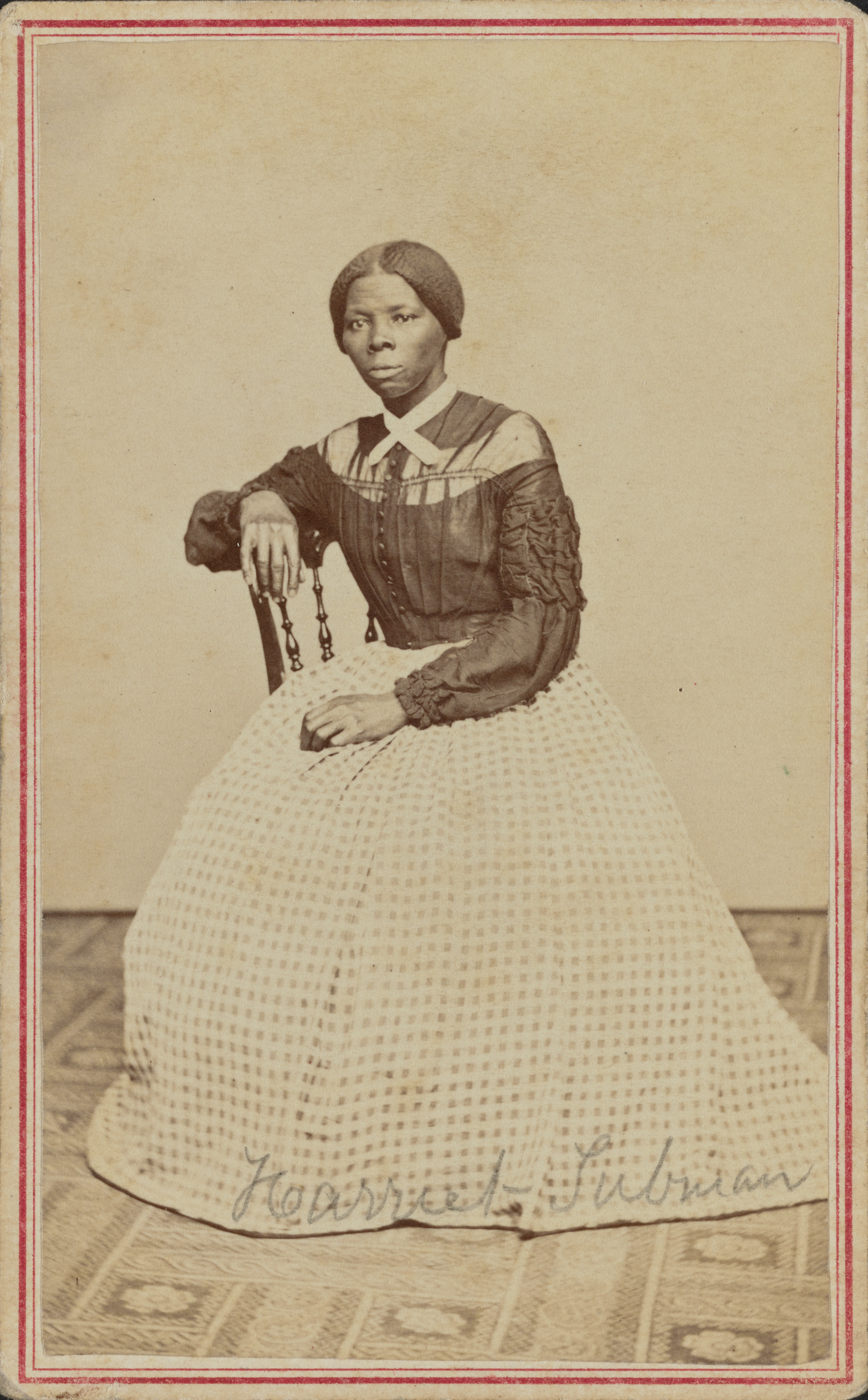
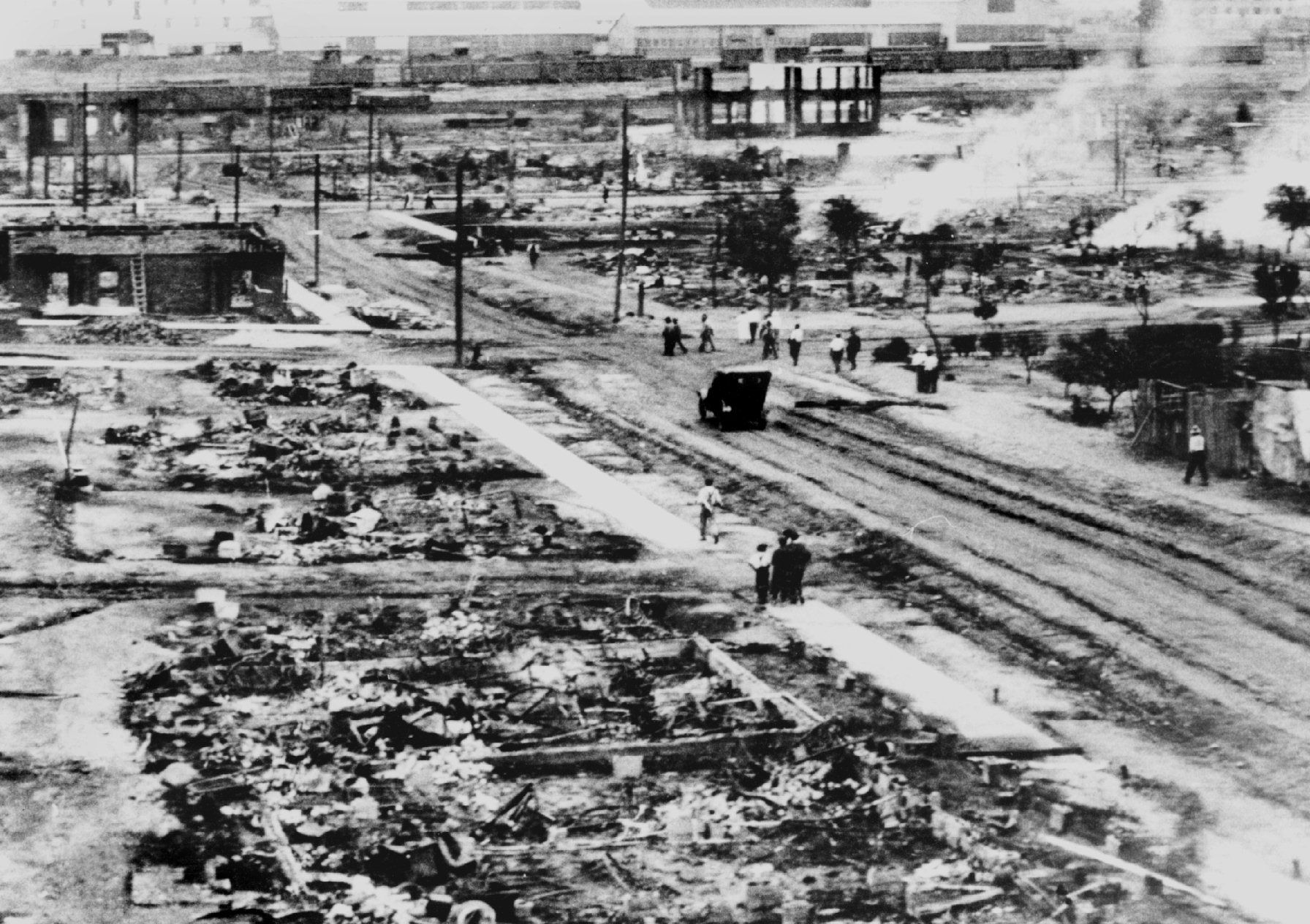
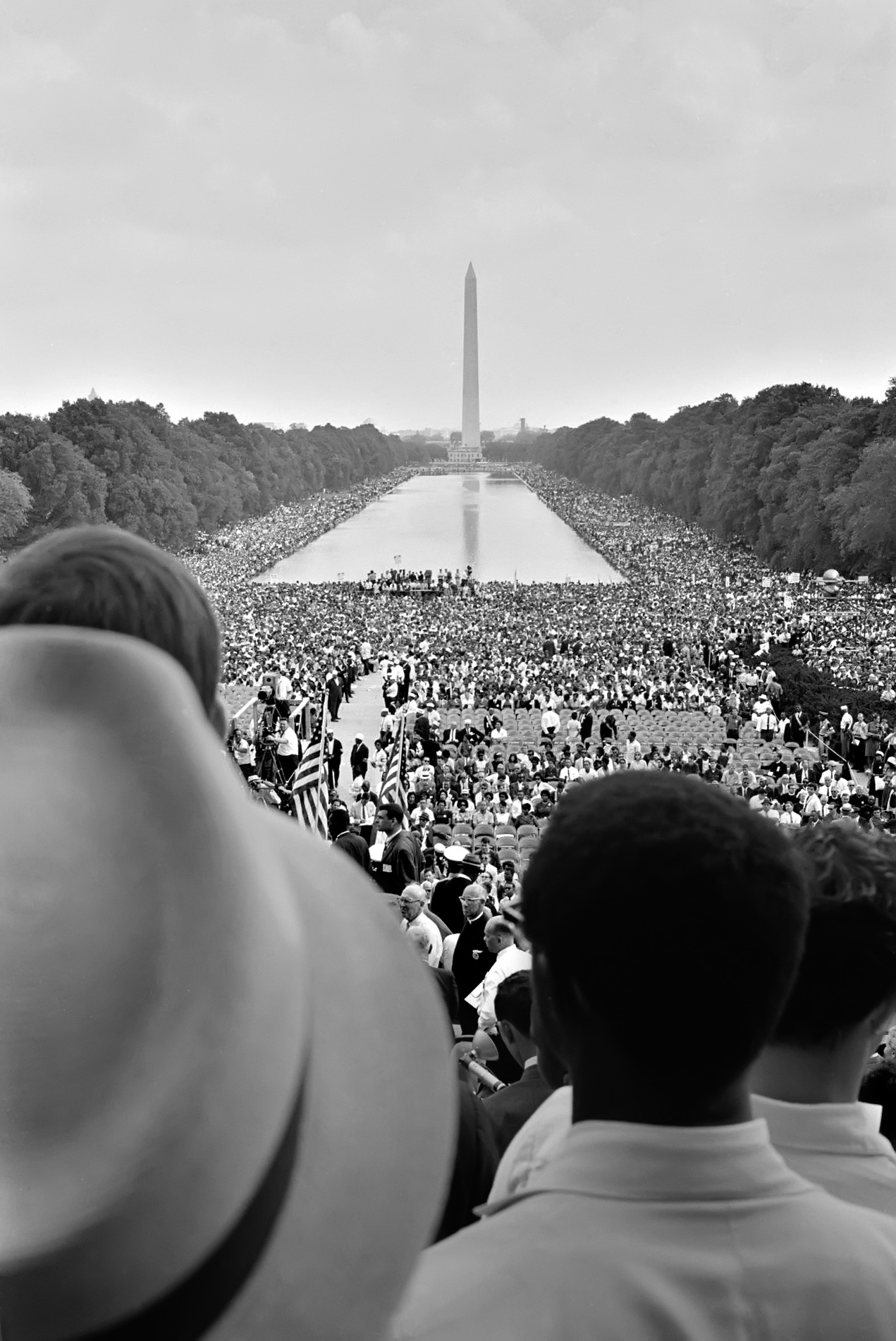
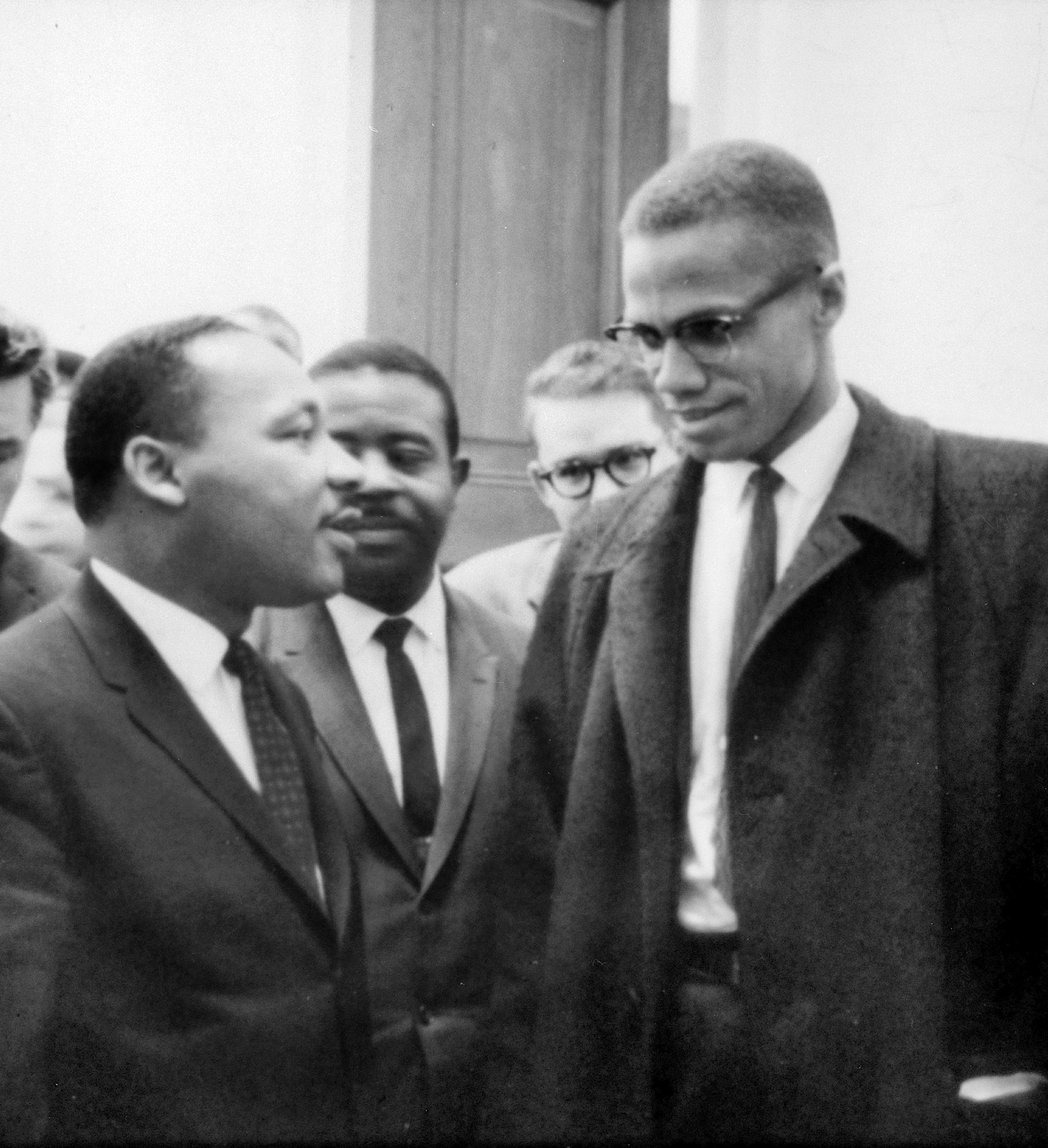
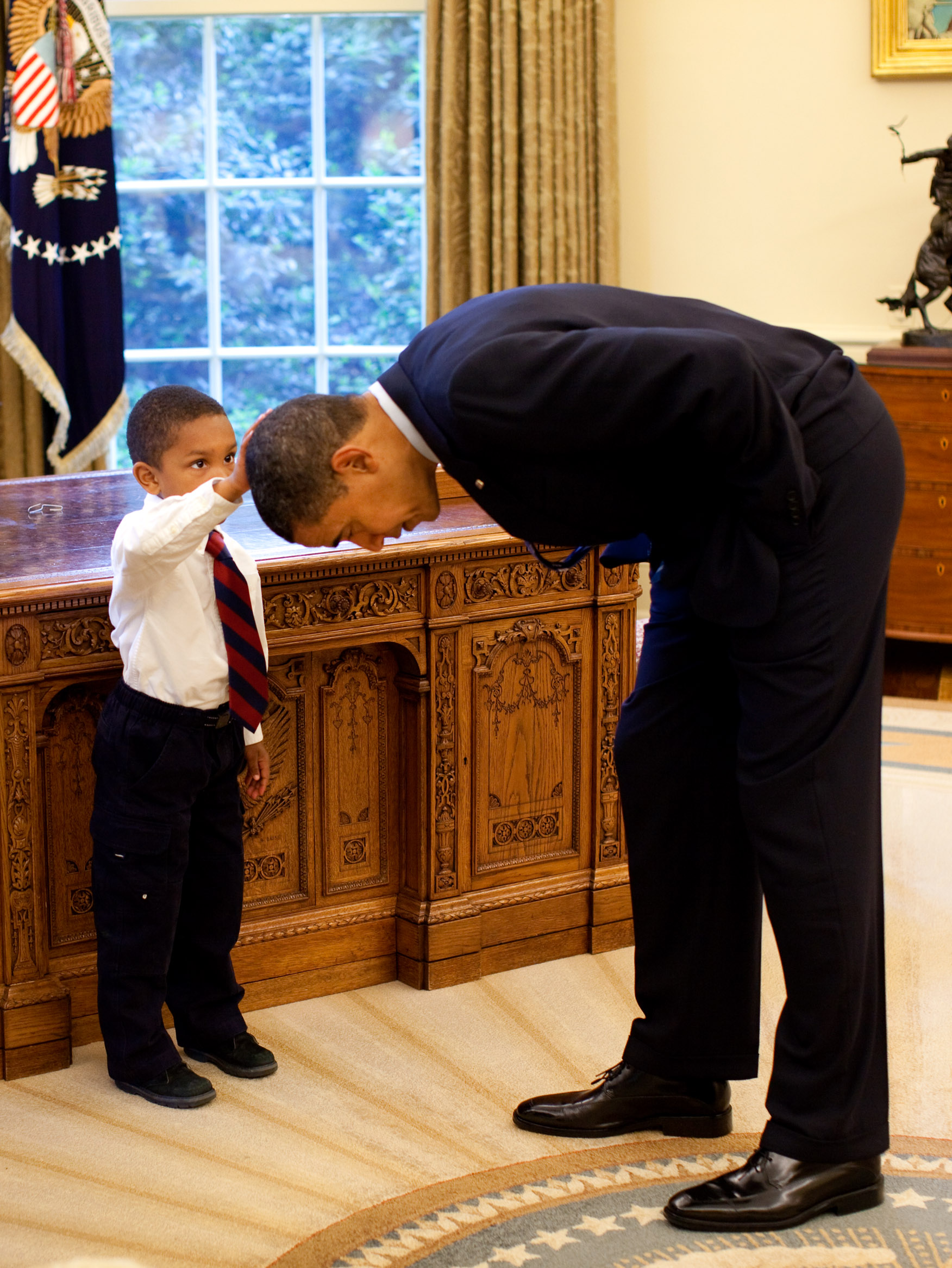
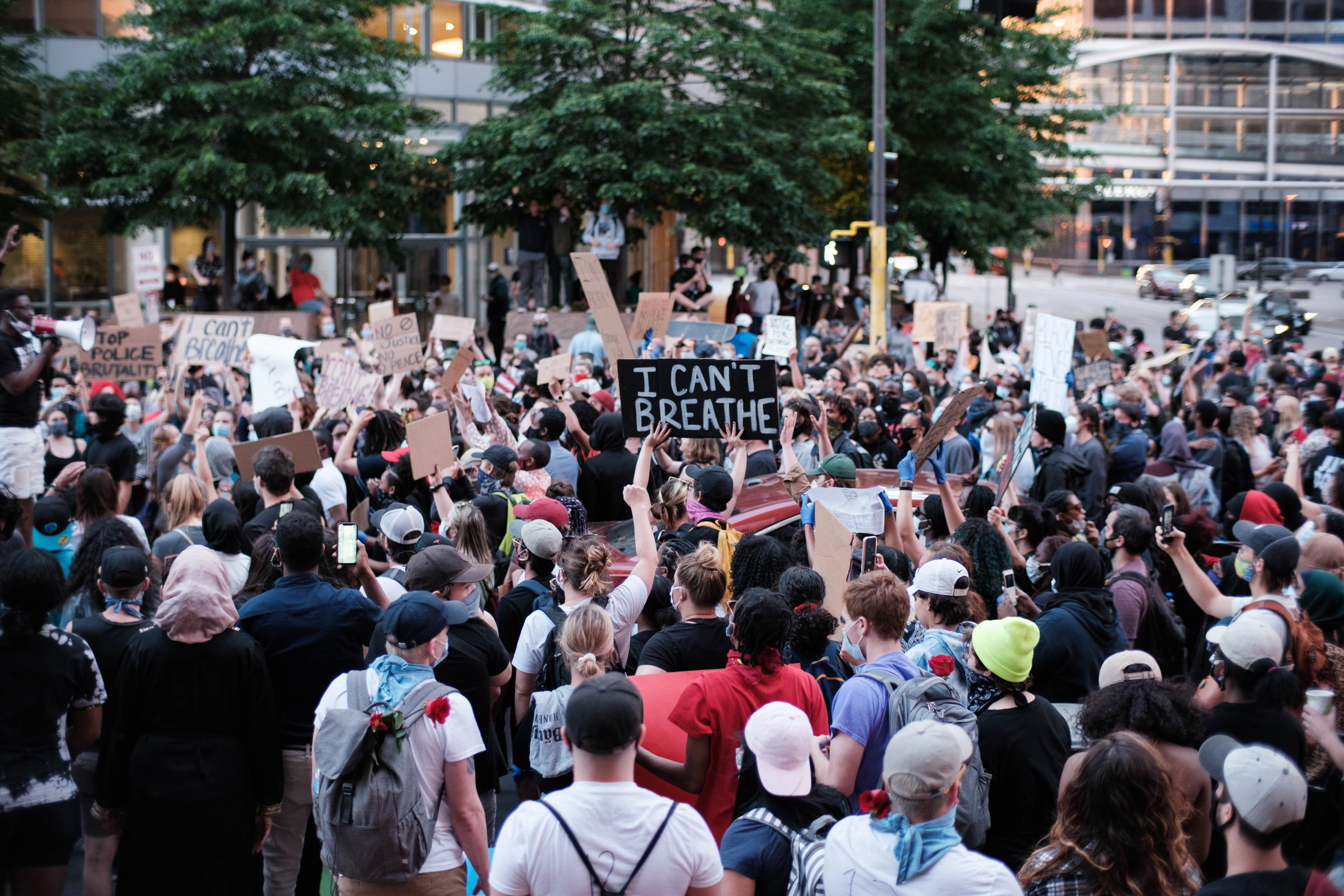
Left-right from top: 1840 depiction of field hands and child, 1857 newspaper ads for runaway slave rewards, Harriet Tubman, aftermath of 1921 Tulsa race massacre, 1963 March on Washington, civil rights movement leader Martin Luther King Jr. with Malcolm X, young boy touching President Obama's hair, 2020 George Floyd protests

African-American history started with the forced transportation of Black Africans to North America in the 16th and 17th centuries. The European colonization of the Americas, and the resulting Atlantic slave trade, encompassed a large-scale transportation of enslaved Africans across the Atlantic. Of the roughly 10–12 million Black Africans who were sold in the Atlantic slave trade, either to Europe or the Americas, approximately 388,000 were sent to North America. After arriving in various European colonies in North America, the enslaved Africans were sold to European colonists, primarily to work on cash crop plantations. A group of enslaved Africans arrived in the English Virginia Colony in 1619, marking the beginning of slavery in the colonial history of the United States; by 1776, roughly 20% of the British North American population was of Black African descent, both free and enslaved.

During the American Revolutionary War, in which the Thirteen Colonies gained independence and began to form the United States, Black soldiers fought on both the British and the American sides. After the conflict ended, the Northern United States gradually abolished slavery. However, the population of the American South, which had an economy dependent on plantations operation by slave labor, increased their usage of slaves to pick cotton, which became the basis of the industrial revolution underway in England and New England. Slavery moved westward from the Southern states during the westward expansion of the United States. During this period, numerous enslaved African Americans escaped into free states and Canada via the Underground Railroad. Disputes over slavery between the Northern and Southern states led to the American Civil War, in which 178,000 African Americans served on the Union side. During the war, Abraham Lincoln issued the Emancipation Proclamation which ended slavery as soon as the Union armies arrived. After the war ended, the Thirteenth Amendment abolished slavery in the U.S., except as punishment for a crime.

In 1863 the Reconstruction era began, in which African Americans living in the South were granted limited rights compared to their white counterparts. After 1876 white opposition to these advancements led to most African Americans living in the South to be disfranchised, and a system of racial segregation known as the Jim Crow laws was passed in the Southern states. Beginning in the early 20th century, in response to poor economic conditions, segregation and lynchings, over 6 million African Americans, primarily rural, migrated out of the South to other regions of the United States in search of opportunity. The nadir of American race relations led to civil rights efforts to overturn discrimination and racism against African Americans. In 1954, these efforts coalesced into a broad unified movement led by civil rights activists such as Rosa Parks, Martin Luther King Jr., and James Bevel, which succeeded in persuading the federal government to pass the Civil Rights Act of 1964, which outlawed racial discrimination, and the Voting Rights Act of 1965.

The 2020 United States census reported that 46,936,733 respondents identified as African Americans, forming roughly 14.2% of the American population. Of those, over 2.1 million immigrated to the United States as citizens of modern African states. African Americans have made major contributions to the culture of the United States, including literature, cinema and music. White supremacy has impacted African American history, resulting in a legacy characterized by systemic oppression, violence, and ongoing disadvantage that the African American community continues to this day.

The legacy of European colonization left African Americans to experience health disparities, economic disadvantages, racial discrimination and racial segregation to this day. African Americans were brought to the United States because of the Native American genocide in the United States. During the 17th century, European colonists in North America increasingly relied on enslaved Africans for labor, as they were a more affordable and abundant workforce compared to Indigenous Native Americans and indentured servants, who were primarily impoverished and poor white Europeans.

== Enslavement and colonial era ==
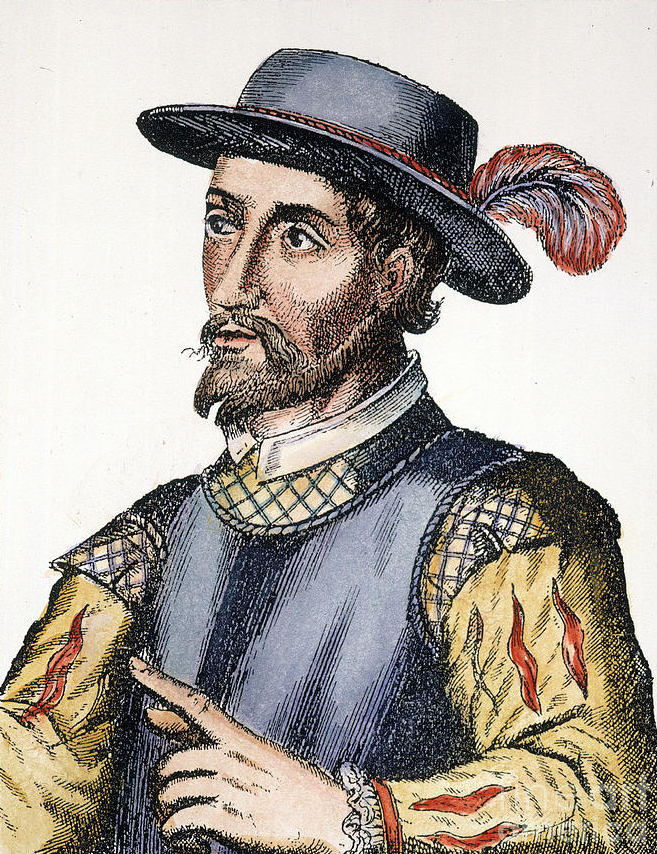
Spanish explorer Juan Ponce de León was the inaugural European to introduce African enslaved individuals to the territorial region of the United States.

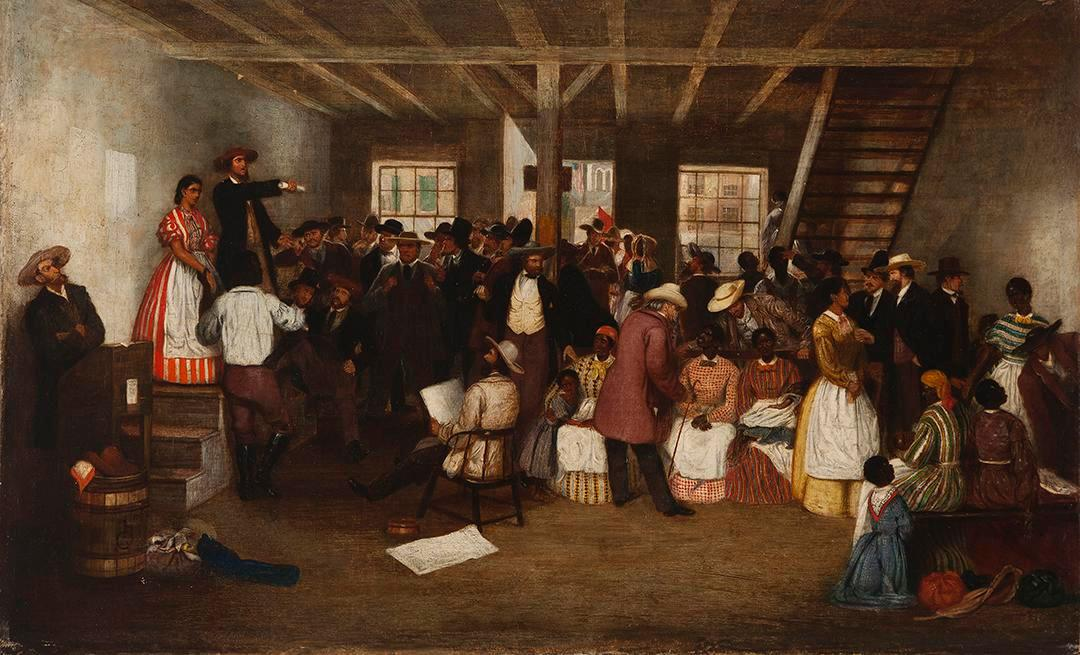
Slave auction in Virginia

Three scenes from the slave trade in Baltimore.

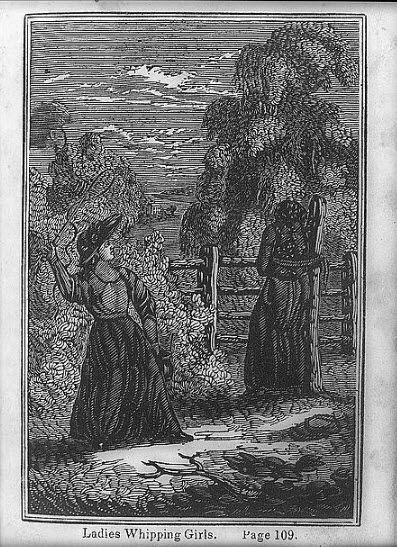
White woman whipping a Black slave girl.

African-American slaves in Georgia

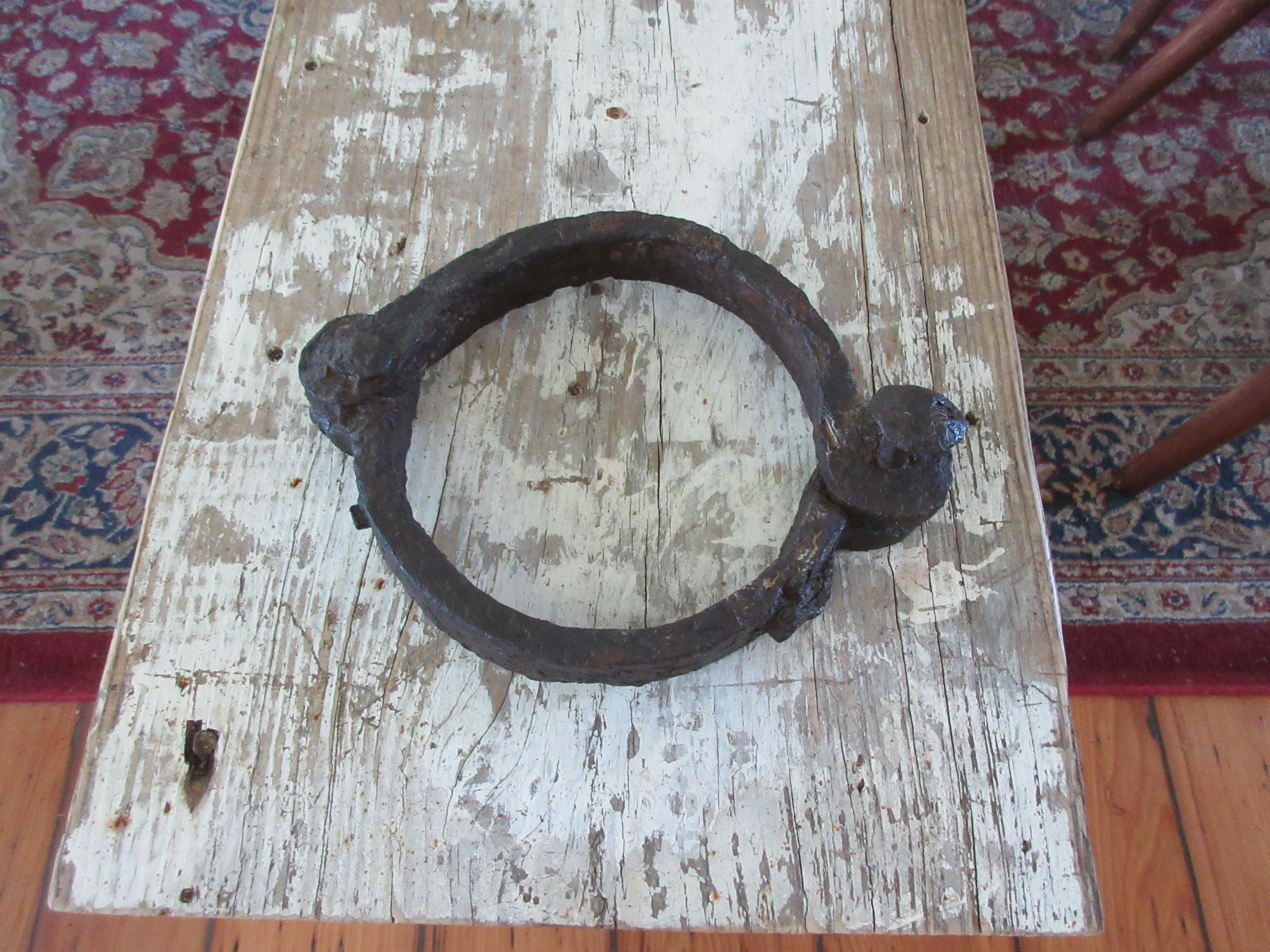
Slave shackle

Native Americans were first enslaved before African Americans; however, their populations declined sharply due to diseases introduced by European colonizers. The Spanish, in particular, devastated Native American communities. Illnesses such as smallpox spread rapidly among Native Americans, destroying entire villages. Throughout the 17th and 18th centuries, multiple major epidemics struck Native American populations, hindering their ability to resist European colonial expansion. As a result, European settlers eventually began enslaving Africans instead. Slavery in the Americas began with Italian explorer and navigator Christopher Columbus. Columbus is said to have brought the first African slaves to the Americas in the late 1490s during his voyages to the Caribbean Island of Hispaniola, which is now present day Haiti and the Dominican Republic. The European trade of enslaving Africans began in the 1400s when the Portuguese captured African slaves in Ras Nouadhibou (Cabo Branco) in present-day Mauritania and then took them to Portugal as slaves. In the area that would later become the United States, there were no African slaves before the Spanish took control of Florida in the early 1500s.

White people imposed slavery on Africans because they deemed black people as inferior and suitable for slavery. Africans were also transported to the colonies because they possessed agricultural knowledge relevant to the cultivation of new crops such as rice in the Americas, making them useful to white planters. From 1750 to 1775, the majority of over 50,000 enslaved black Africans were forcibly taken from the aptly named Rice Coast, a traditional rice-growing area situated between Guinea and Guinea-Bissau, as well as the western Ivory Coast, with its core located in present-day Sierra Leone and Liberia. Since rice was not native to the Americas and European plantation owners lacked the knowledge required for its cultivation, enslaved Africans were brought in to support its farming, supplying the eastern seaboard of the United States, Britain, and provisioning various regions of the British Caribbean. In the antebellum South, cotton was regarded as the king of commodities but then rice was undoubtedly the queen. Rice brought unparalleled economic strength, transforming the cities of Charleston, South Carolina and Savannah, Georgia into bustling cosmopolitan ports. White people also used the Curse of Ham biblical belief to justify slavery. African men, women, and children were abducted and kidnapped from various African regions that include present-day Nigeria, Ghana, Sierra Leone, and the Democratic Republic of the Congo. They were seized during raids conducted by slave traders or sold by African leaders amid local conflicts. Evidence of this can be found in writings by individuals who experienced enslavement. Olaudah Equiano in his autobiography recounted his violent capture from his village, alongside his sister, in the Kingdom of Benin. Another author, Ottobah Cugoano, narrated his experience of being assaulted and threatened by armed men. Enslaved African individuals were shackled together in groups and transported by boat along the waterways of West Africa to the coast. At this location, traders awaited to sell these enslaved individuals to European merchants. Following the 1707 Act of Union, England and Scotland merged to form the Kingdom of Great Britain. British participation in the slave trade escalated during the 1700s after the Treaty of Utrecht (1713) granted them the authority to sell enslaved individuals within the Spanish Empire. The British empire later enslaved Africans in the United States after the Spanish. By the year 1770, British vessels were engaged in the transportation of approximately 42,000 Africans annually each year. The earliest records of the Atlantic slave trade comes from a Portuguese seamen named Gomes Eannes de Azurara, who witnessed a Portuguese raid on a village in Africa.

The Doctrine of Discovery, which was proclaimed by the Spanish former head of the Catholic Church Pope Alexander VI in the year 1493, asserted the entitlement of any Christian nation to seize the territories of non-Christians under the pretext of saving their souls. In the same year, the pope also announced that the non-Christian residents of these territories could be subjected to enslavement for this very reason. Slavery had been a longstanding practice in Africa before the white Europeans arrived, and thus the mechanisms for capturing and transporting human cargo were already established.

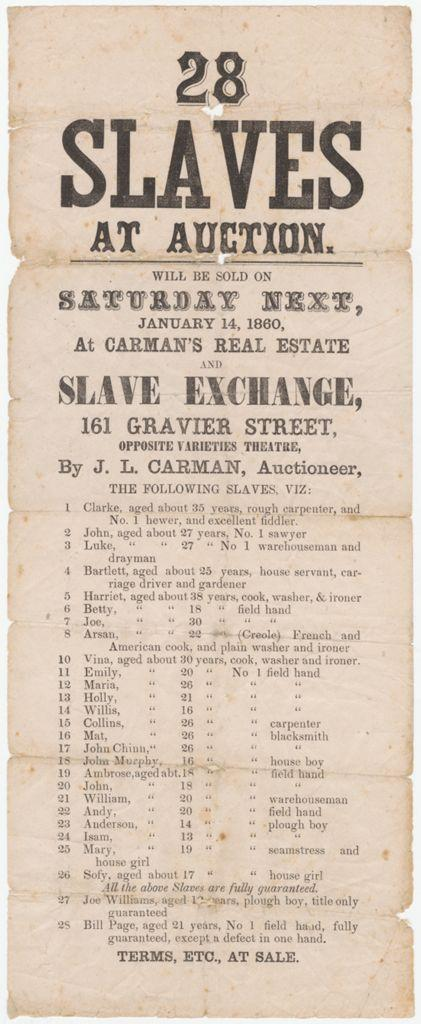
Slave auction in Louisiana

Before arriving in the Americas, On European slave ships sub-saharan Africans transported to the New World suffered the anguish and trauma of enslavement caused by white men, regardless of their gender, age, or nationality. Captured deep within the African continent, they endured a prolonged and perilous journey to the coast. Often traveling for months, they were transferred from one group to another, as numerous African nations were involved in the slave trade. However, regardless of who led the captives to their unwelcome fate, the conditions of their journey were exceedingly grueling. In certain regions, approximately forty percent of the Africans perished between their initial capture in the interior and their arrival at the coast. The captives then confronted the horrific transatlantic voyage. The extent of human suffering and the staggering death toll of men and women crammed into the foul-smelling holds of the ships remains hard to comprehend. Stripped of their clothing and all possessions, they boarded the vessel and encountered—often for the first time—white men. Wielding heated irons to brand their captives in an intensely personal manner, these 'white men with dreadful appearances, flushed faces, and long hair' inflicted more than just physical scars. Many enslaved Africans believed that these white men were allied with Satan, if not the devils themselves. For other Africans, the trauma of having their skin burned confirmed their fate as being destined for the slaughterhouse, to be consumed by cannibals, who had marked them in a manner similar to how animals were branded. Africans were usually purchased by white people at slave auctions.

Only around 600,000 African American slaves were bought, purchased and sold in the United States before the Civil War, which was way less than Brazil, South America, Spanish America and the Caribbean. Many of those sales separated parents from their children. Sexual abuse was common on slave ships and many Africans committed suicide by jumping over the ship. Despite their significant numbers, slaves generally represented a minority within the local population in the United States compared to the white population. It was only in antebellum South Carolina and Mississippi that the number of slaves exceeded that of free individuals. The majority of Southerners did not own African American slaves, and most slaves resided in small groups rather than on expansive plantations in the South. Fewer than one-quarter of white Southerners possessed slaves, with half of these individuals owning fewer than five, and less than 1 percent owning more than one hundred. In 1860, the average number of slaves living together was approximately ten. Typically, individuals classified as white people were not slaves, although only Native Americans and African Americans could be. An unusual, odd situation arose with the children of a free white woman and a slave: the law frequently subjected these individuals to servitude for thirty-one years. While conversion the to Christian religion could grant freedom to a slave during the early colonial era, this practice soon faded away. By 1860, the total value of slaves owned by Southerners approached $4 billion.

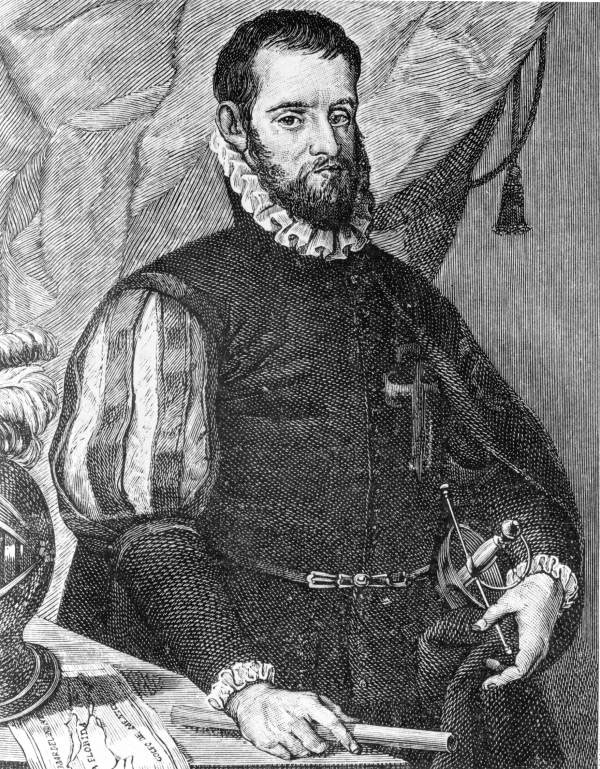
Spanish explorer Pedro Menéndez de Avilés was among the earliest European figures to introduce enslaved African individuals to the United States, specifically to St. Augustine, Florida, which stands as the nation's oldest established city.

Before the Atlantic slave trade began European travelers to Africa were both intrigued and shocked by the clothing and customs of the black Africans they encountered. The minimal clothing worn by Africans, suitable for the hot climate, the practice of polygamy among some tribes, and the seemingly provocative tribal dances led white Europeans to view Africans as sexually licentious. William Smith described African women as "hot constitution’d Ladies" who were "constantly devising ways to attract lovers." These early accounts contributed to the stereotype of Black women as sexually promiscuous. Later, such beliefs, among others, were used to justify the enslavement of black Africans. During the period of slavery in the United States, the notion that Black women had uncontrollable sexual desires was employed to rationalize the sexual abuse of enslaved African women by their white owners.

Juan Garrido, a Spanish conquistador with origins in Kongo, holds the distinction of being the first individual of African descent to undertake exploration of the United States.

=== African origins ===
African Americans are the descendants of Africans who were forced into slavery in America by Europeans as part of the Atlantic slave trade. The major ethnic groups that the enslaved Africans belonged to included the Mbundu, Bakongo, Igbo, Mandinka, Wolof, Akan, Fon, Yoruba, and Makua, among many others. Once they were enslaved and sent to the Americas, these different peoples had European standards and beliefs forced upon them, causing them to do away with tribal differences and forge a new common culture that was a creolization of their original cultures and European cultures. People who belonged to specific African ethnic groups were more sought after and became more dominant in numbers than people who belonged to other African ethnic groups in certain regions of the land that is now the United States.

Studies of contemporary documents reveal seven regions from which Africans were sold or taken during the Atlantic slave trade. These regions were:

- Senegambia (present-day Senegal and The Gambia) encompassing the coast from the Senegal River to the Casamance River, where captives as far away as the Upper and Middle Niger River Valley were sold;
- The Sierra Leone region included territory from the Casamance to the Assinie in the modern countries of Guinea-Bissau, Guinea, Sierra Leone, Liberia, and Côte d'Ivoire;
- The Gold Coast region consisted of mainly modern Ghana;
- The Bight of Benin region stretched from the Volta River to the Benue River in modern Togo, Benin, and southwestern Nigeria;
- The Bight of Biafra extended from southeastern Nigeria through Cameroon into Gabon;
- West Central Africa, the largest region, included the Congo and Angola; and
- East and Southeast Africa, the region of Mozambique-Madagascar included the modern countries of Mozambique, parts of Tanzania, and Madagascar.

The largest origin of Africans transported as slaves across the Atlantic Ocean for the New World was West Africa. Some West Africans were skilled iron workers and were therefore able to make tools that aided in their agricultural labor. While there were many unique tribes with their own customs and religions, by the 15th century many of the tribes had embraced Islam. Those villages in West Africa which were lucky enough to be in good conditions for growth and success, prospered. They also contributed their success to the slave trade for their own benefit.

Origins and percentages of African Americans imported to the Thirteen Colonies, New France, and New Spain (1700–1820):

Region	Percentage
West Central Africa	26.1%
Bight of Biafra	24.4%
Sierra Leone	15.8%
Senegambia	14.5%
Gold Coast	13.1%
Bight of Benin	4.3%
Mozambique-Madagascar	1.8%
Total	100.0%

In the account of Olaudah Equiano, he described the process of being transported to the colonies and being on the slave ships as a horrific experience. On the ships, the enslaved Africans were separated from their family long before they boarded the ships. Once aboard the ships the captives were then segregated by gender. Under the deck, the enslaved Africans were cramped and did not have enough space to walk around freely. Enslaved males were generally kept in the ship's hold, where they experienced the worst of crowding. The captives stationed on the floor beneath low-lying bunks could barely move and spent much of the voyage pinned to the floorboards, which could, over time, wear the skin on their elbows down to the bone. Due to the lack of basic hygiene, malnourishment, and dehydration diseases spread wildly and death was common.

The women on the ships were often raped by the crewmen. Women and children were often kept in rooms set apart from the main hold to give crewmen access to the women. However, these rooms also gave enslaved women better access to information on the ship's crew, fortifications, and daily routine, but little opportunity to communicate this to the men confined in the ship's hold. Women instigated, among other attempts at mutiny, a 1797 insurrection aboard the slave ship Thomas by stealing weapons and passing them to the men below as well as engaging in hand-to-hand combat with the ship's crew. Enslaved males were the most likely candidates to mutiny but were only able to at times they were on deck. While rebellions did not happen often, they were usually unsuccessful. In order for the crew members to keep the enslaved Africans under control and prevent future rebellions, the crews were often twice as large and members would instill fear into the enslaved Africans through brutality and harsh punishments. It took about six months from the time of capture for enslaved Africans to arrive on the plantations of their European masters. Africans were completely cut off from their families, home, and community life and were forced to adjust to a new way of life.

White men sexually assaulted and abused black slaves on slave ships and plantations. Enslaved black women were often forced to be naked on slave ships and were often sexually abused by white sailors.

President Andrew Jackson, a significant slaveholder, implemented the Indian Removal Act of 1830 to displace tens of thousands of Native Americans from their traditional lands. He pursued this action mainly to make available 25 million acres of productive Southern land for white settlers, which swiftly promoted the growth of plantation agriculture and the practice of African American slavery in the Southern slave states. The removal of Native Americans in the South for the white demand of African American slavery resulted in the Trail of Tears and the deaths of thousands of Native Americans.

=== Colonial era ===
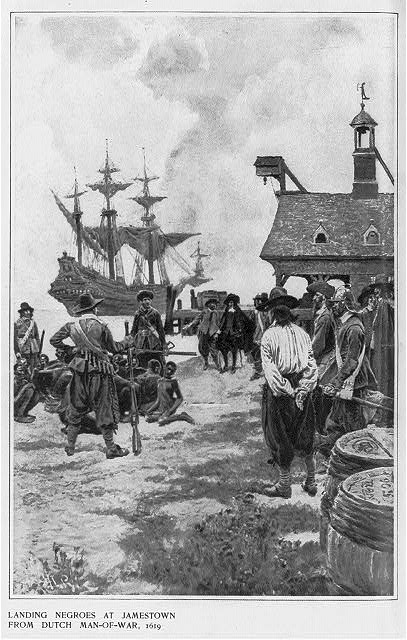
"Landing Negroes at Jamestown from Dutch man-of-war, 1619", 1901

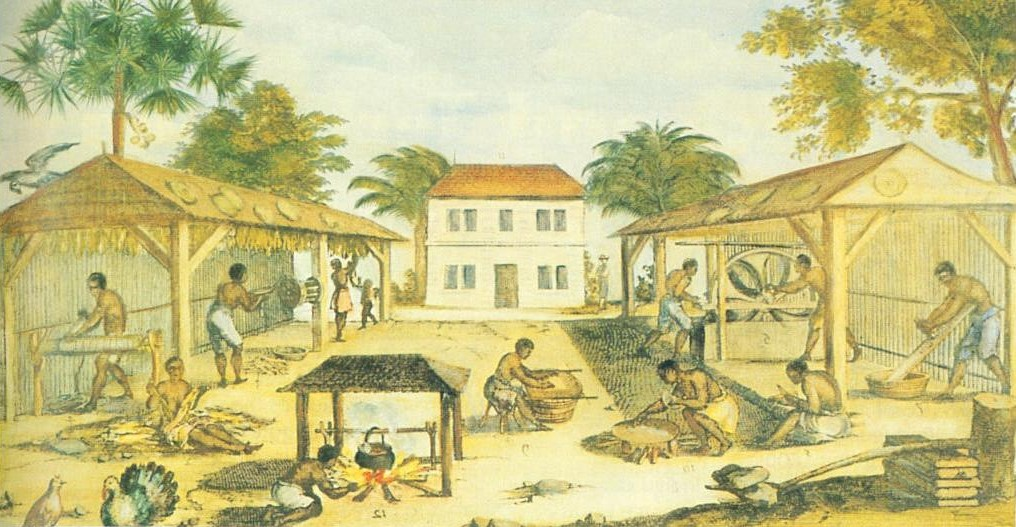
"Slaves working in 17th-century Virginia", by an unknown artist, 1670

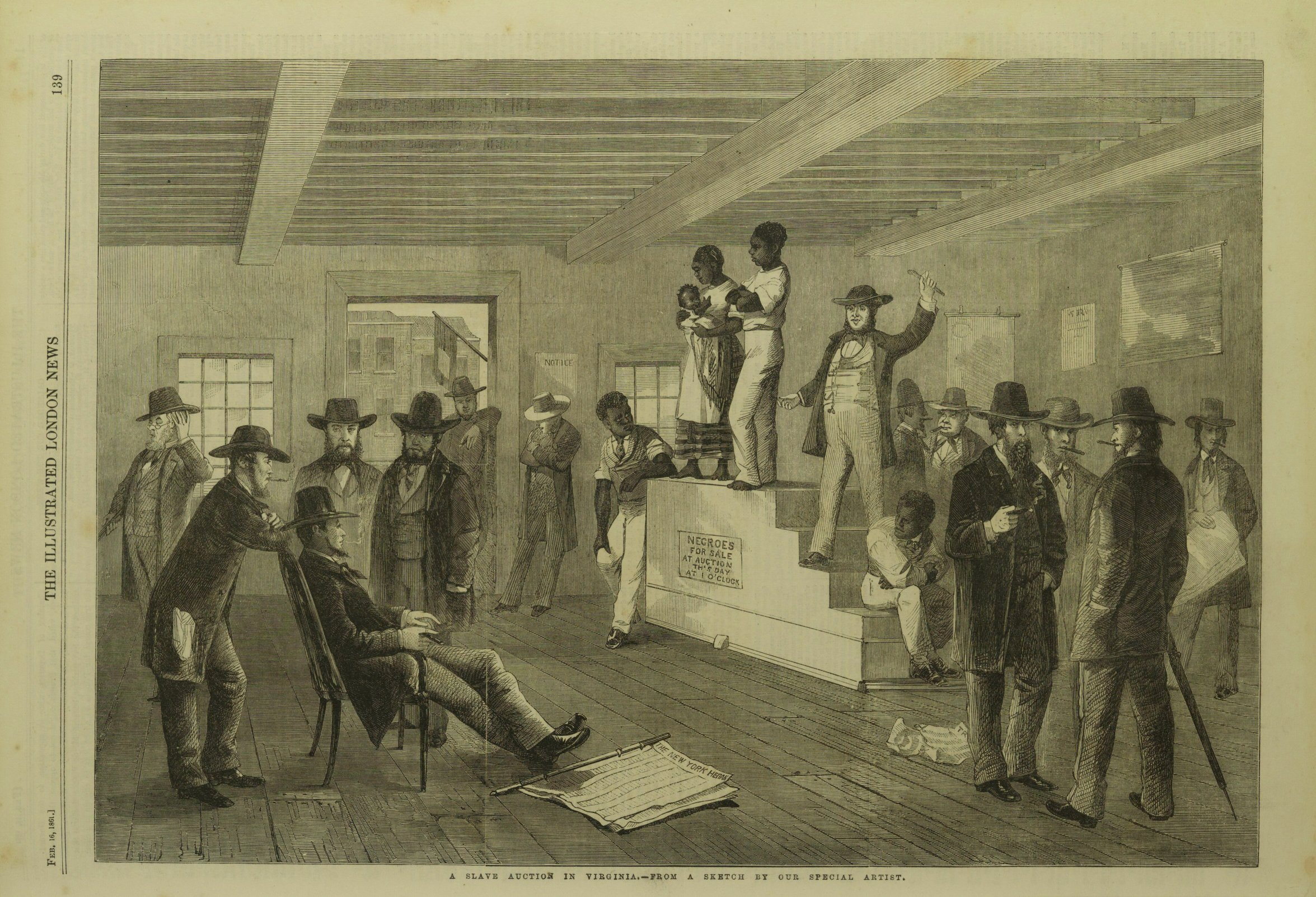
Slave auction in Virginia

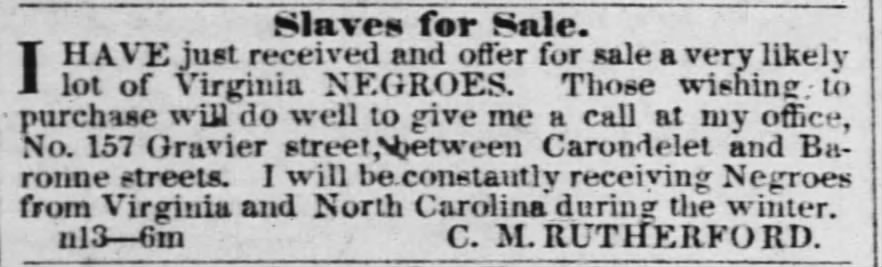
Slaves for sale in New Orleans

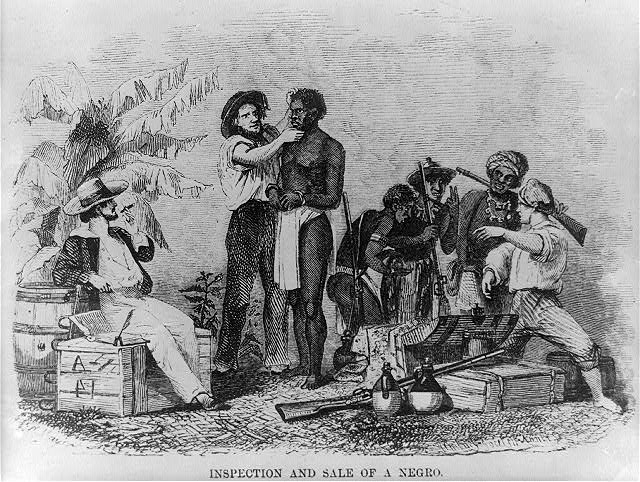
The inspection and sale of a slave

Between 1444 and 1882, approximately 15 to 20 million or more West Africans—from areas such as Ghana, Senegal, Mali, Songhay, Mossi, Bornu, and other regions—were forcibly taken from their native lands and transported to North America. Spain, France and Britain were the primary leaders in this form of piracy, although slavers also originated from Portugal, Denmark, Sweden and the Netherlands.

Some Africans assisted the Spanish and the Portuguese during their early exploration and conquest of the Americas. In the 16th century some Black explorers settled in the Mississippi valley and in the areas that became South Carolina and New Mexico. The most celebrated Black explorer of the Americas was Estéban, who traveled through the Southwest in the 1530s.

In 1619, the first captive Africans were brought and sold via a Dutch slave ship in Point Comfort (today Fort Monroe in Hampton, Virginia). Colonizers in Virginia treated these captives as indentured servants and released them after a number of years. This practice was gradually abandoned in favor of the system of chattel slavery used in the Caribbean because the colonizers realized when servants were freed, they became competition for resources. Additionally, releasing servants led to Europeans desiring to replace them, which was additional labor. This, combined with the ambiguous nature of the social status of African people and the difficulty in using any other group of people as forced servants, led to the choice of subjugating African people into slavery. Massachusetts was the first colony to legalize slavery in 1641. Other colonies followed suit by passing laws that made slave status heritable and made non-Christian imported servants slaves for life.

By 1700, there were 25,000 enslaved Black people in the North American mainland colonies, forming roughly 10% of the population. Some enslaved Black people had been directly transported from Africa (most of them were from 1518 to the 1850s), but initially, in the very early stages of the European colonization of North America, occasionally they had been transported via the West Indies in small groups after being forced to work under harsh conditions on the islands. Concurrently, many were born to enslaved Africans and their descendants, and thus were native-born on the North American mainland. Their legal status was codified into law with the Virginia Statutes: ACT XII of 1662, proclaiming all children upon birth would inherit the same status of enslavement as their mother.

As European colonists engaged in aggressive expansionism, claiming and clearing more land— via the displacement of Native Americans— for large-scale farming. Plantations were constructed, and in the 1660s enslavement and transport of Africans rapidly increased. The slave trade from the West Indies proved insufficient to meet demand in the now fast-growing North American slave market. Additionally, most North American buyers of enslaved people no longer wanted to purchase enslaved people who had already endured slavery in the West Indies—by now they were either harder to obtain, too expensive, undesirable, or more often, they had been exhausted in many ways by the brutality of the islands' sugar plantations. From the 1680s onward, the majority of enslaved Africans imported into North America were directly from Africa, and most of them were sent to ports located in what is now the Southern U.S., particularly in the present-day states of Virginia, South Carolina, Georgia, and Louisiana.

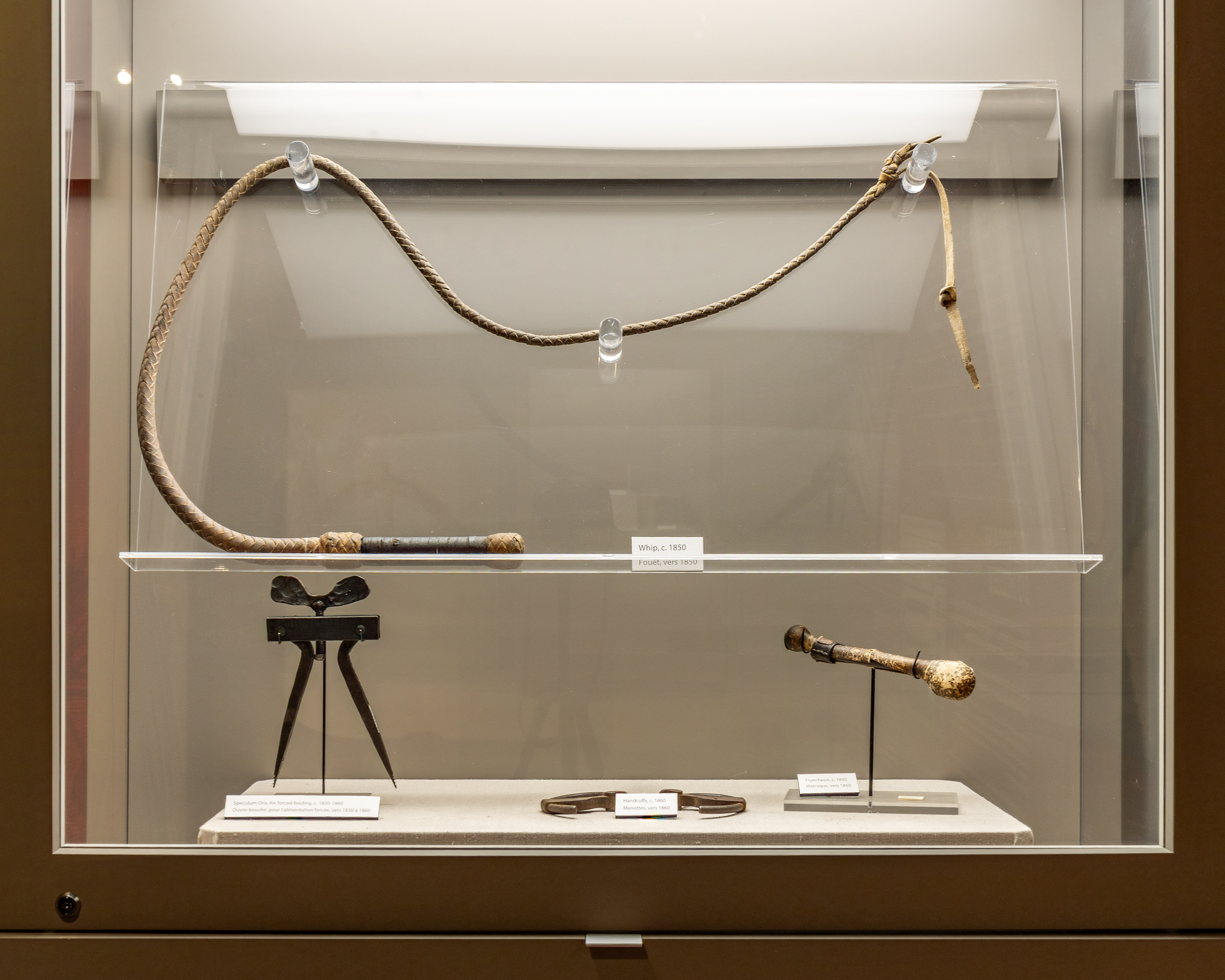
Slave whips were used to punish slaves. Slaves often suffered from sleep deprivation due to overwork.

Slaves were often punished using a whip if they did not obey their white masters. White people also mutilated and branded their slaves.

Slaves also suffered from sleep deprivation, insomnia and sleep disorders due to slavery.

Welsh-born English colonist Hugh Gwyn was the first white slave owner in Virginia.

During the era of slavery, white masters viewed black slaves as being sexually accessible to them. White men considered black women as sexually available objects. Consequently, black women slaves were often labeled as promiscuous and sexually available to white men according to white societal norms. Additionally, white women engaged in clandestine sexual relations and often engaged in infidelity with black men throughout the period of slavery.

=== Black population in the 18th century ===
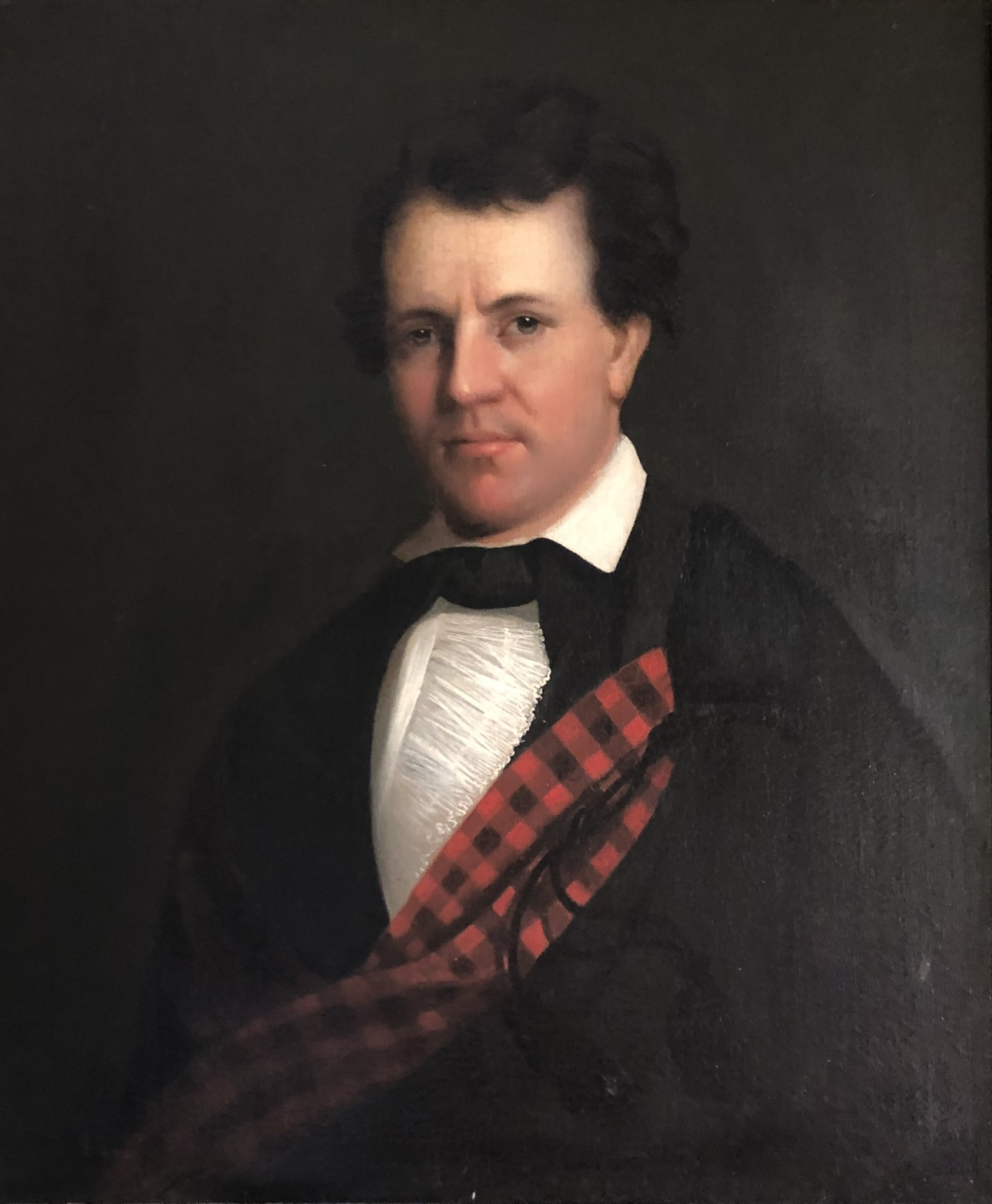
Joseph Alexander Smith Acklen was one of the largest white slave owners in American history who owned many Black slaves.

The population of enslaved African Americans in North America grew rapidly during the 18th and early 19th centuries due to a variety of factors, including a lower prevalence of tropic diseases and rape of black women by white men. Colonial society was divided over the religious and moral implications of slavery, though it remained legal in each of the Thirteen Colonies until the American Revolution. Slavery led to a gradual shift between the American South and North, both before and after independence, as the comparatively more urbanized and industrialized North required fewer slaves than the South.

By the 1750s, the native-born enslaved population of African descent outnumbered that of the African-born enslaved. By the time of the American Revolution, several Northern states were considering the abolition of slavery. However some Southern colonies, such as Virginia, had produced such large and self-sustaining native-born enslaved Black populations that they stopped taking indirect imports of enslaved Africans altogether. Other colonies such as Georgia and South Carolina still relied on steady enslavement of people to keep up with the ever-growing demand for agricultural labor among the burgeoning plantation economies. These colonies continued to import enslaved Africans until the trade was outlawed in 1808, save for a temporary lull during the Revolutionary War.

South Carolina's Black population remained very high for most of the eighteenth century due to the continued import of enslaved Africans, with Blacks outnumbering whites three-to-one. In contrast, Virginia had a consistent white majority despite its significant Black enslaved population. It was said that in the eighteenth century, the colony South Carolina resembled an "extension of West Africa".

== American Revolution and early United States ==
The latter half of the 18th century was a time of significant political upheaval on the North American continent. In the midst of cries for independence from British rule, many pointed out the hypocrisy inherent in colonial slaveholders' demands for freedom. The Declaration of Independence, a document which would become a manifesto for human rights and personal freedom around the world, was written by Thomas Jefferson, a man who owned over 200 enslaved people. Other Southern statesmen were also major slaveholders. The Second Continental Congress considered freeing enslaved people to assist with the war effort, but they also removed language from the Declaration of Independence that included the promotion of slavery amongst the offenses of King George III. A number of free Black people, most notably Prince Hall—founder of Prince Hall Freemasonry—submitted petitions which called for abolition, but these were largely ignored.

This did not deter Black people, free and enslaved, from participating in the Revolution. Crispus Attucks, a free Black tradesman, was the first casualty of the Boston Massacre and of the ensuing American Revolutionary War. 5,000 Black people, including Prince Hall, fought in the Continental Army. Many fought side by side with White soldiers at the battles of Lexington and Concord and at Bunker Hill. However, upon George Washington's ascension to commander of the Continental Army in 1775, the additional recruitment of Black people was forbidden.

Approximately 5,000 free African-American men helped the American Colonists in their struggle for freedom. One of these men, Agrippa Hull, fought in the American Revolution for over six years. He and the other African-American soldiers fought in order to improve their white neighbor's views of them and advance their own fight of freedom.

By contrast, the British and Loyalists offered emancipation to any enslaved person owned by a Patriot who was willing to join the Loyalist forces. Lord Dunmore, the Governor of Virginia, recruited 300 African-American men into his Ethiopian regiment within a month of making this proclamation. In South Carolina 25,000 enslaved people, more than one-quarter of the total, escaped to join and fight with the British, or fled for freedom in the uproar of war. Thousands of enslaved people also escaped in Georgia and Virginia, as well as New England and New York. Well-known African Americans who fought for the British include Colonel Tye and Boston King.

Thomas Peters was one of the large numbers of African Americans who fought for the British. Peters was born in present-day Nigeria and belonged to the Yoruba tribe, and ended up being captured and sold into slavery in French Louisiana. Sold again, he was enslaved in North Carolina and escaped his master's farm in order to receive Lord Dunmore's promise of freedom. Peters had fought for the British throughout the war. When the war finally ended, he and other African Americans who fought on the losing side were taken to Nova Scotia. Here, they encountered difficulty farming the small plots of lands they were granted. They also did not receive the same privileges and opportunities as the white Loyalists had. Peters sailed to London in order to complain to the government. "He arrived at a momentous time when English abolitionists were pushing a bill through Parliament to charter the Sierra Leone Company and to grant it trading and settlement rights on the West African coast." Peters and the other African Americans on Nova Scotia left for Sierra Leone in 1792. Peters died soon after they arrived, but the other members of his party lived on in their new home where they formed the Sierra Leone Creole ethnic identity.

=== American independence ===
The colonists eventually won the war and the United States was recognized as a sovereign nation. In the provisional treaty, they demanded the return of property, including enslaved people. Nonetheless, the British helped up to 3,000 documented African Americans to leave the country for Nova Scotia, Jamaica and Britain rather than be returned to slavery.

The Constitutional Convention of 1787 sought to define the foundation for the government of the newly formed United States of America. The constitution set forth the ideals of freedom and equality while providing for the continuation of the institution of slavery through the fugitive slave clause and the three-fifths compromise. Additionally, free Black people's rights were also restricted in many places. Most were denied the right to vote and were excluded from public schools. Some Black people sought to fight these contradictions in court. In 1780, Elizabeth Freeman and Quock Walker used language from the new Massachusetts constitution that declared all men were born free and equal in freedom suits to gain release from slavery. A free Black businessman in Boston named Paul Cuffe sought to be excused from paying taxes since he had no voting rights.

In the Northern states, the revolutionary spirit did help African Americans. Beginning in the 1750s, there was widespread sentiment during the American Revolution that slavery was a social evil (for the country as a whole and for the whites) that should eventually be abolished. All the Northern states passed emancipation acts between 1780 and 1804; most of these arranged for gradual emancipation and a special status for freedmen, so there were still a dozen "permanent apprentices" into the 19th century. In 1787 Congress passed the Northwest Ordinance and barred slavery from the large Northwest Territory. In 1790, there were more than 59,000 free Black people in the United States. By 1810, that number had risen to 186,446. Most of these were in the North, but Revolutionary sentiments also motivated Southern slaveholders.

For 20 years after the Revolution, more Southerners also freed enslaved people, sometimes by manumission or in wills to be accomplished after the slaveholder's death. In the Upper South, the percentage of free Black people rose from about 1% before the Revolution to more than 10% by 1810. Quakers and Moravians worked to persuade slaveholders to free families. In Virginia, the number of free Black people increased from 10,000 in 1790 to nearly 30,000 in 1810, but 95% of Black people were still enslaved. In Delaware, three-quarters of all Black people were free by 1810. By 1860, just over 91% of Delaware's Black people were free, and 49.1% of those in Maryland.

Among the successful free men was Benjamin Banneker, a Maryland astronomer, mathematician, almanac author, surveyor, and farmer, who in 1791 assisted in the initial survey of the boundaries of the future District of Columbia. Despite the challenges of living in the new country, most free Black people fared far better than the nearly 800,000 enslaved Blacks. Even so, many considered emigrating to Africa.

=== Antebellum period and lynchings ===
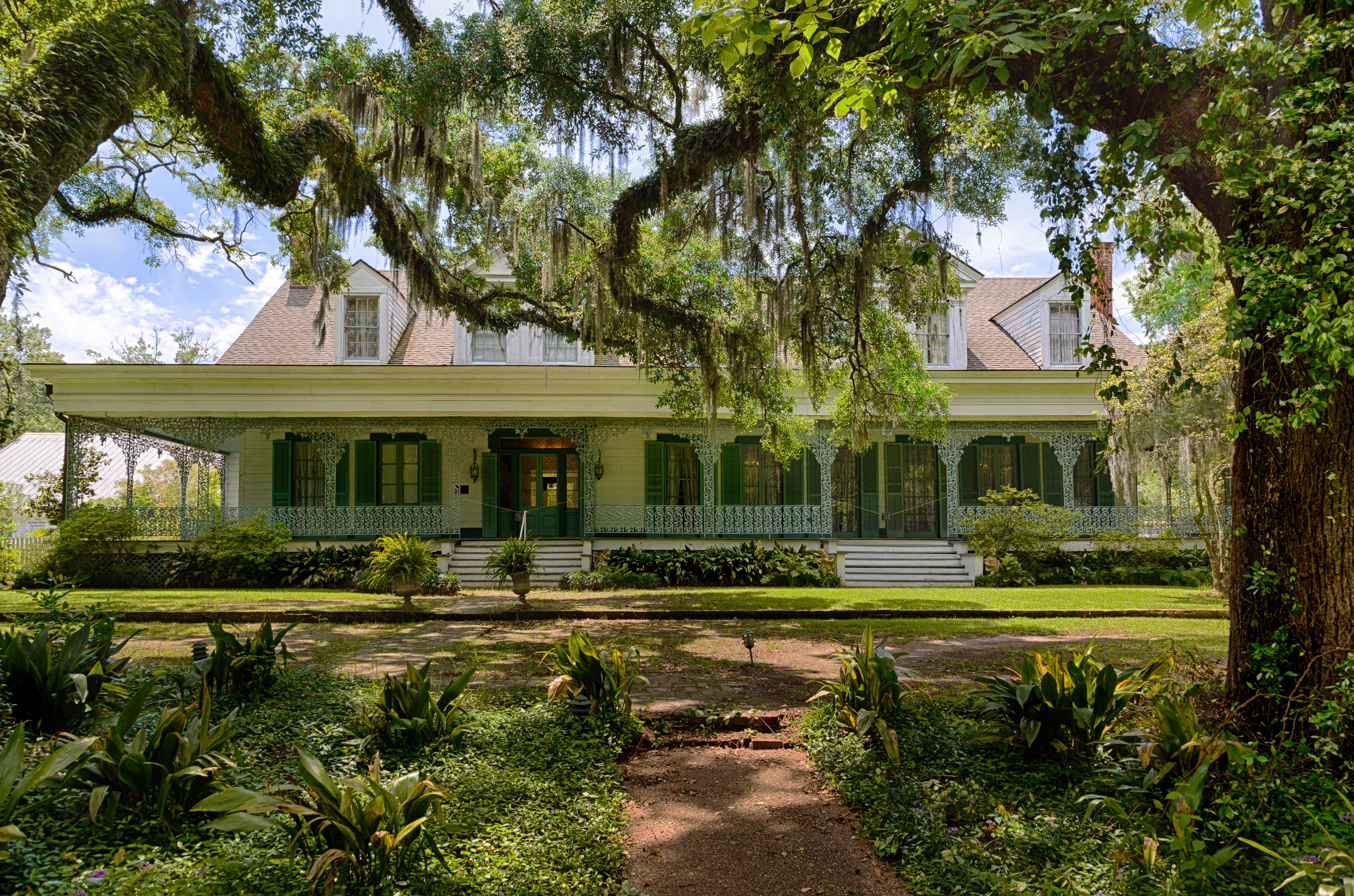
A plantation in Louisiana

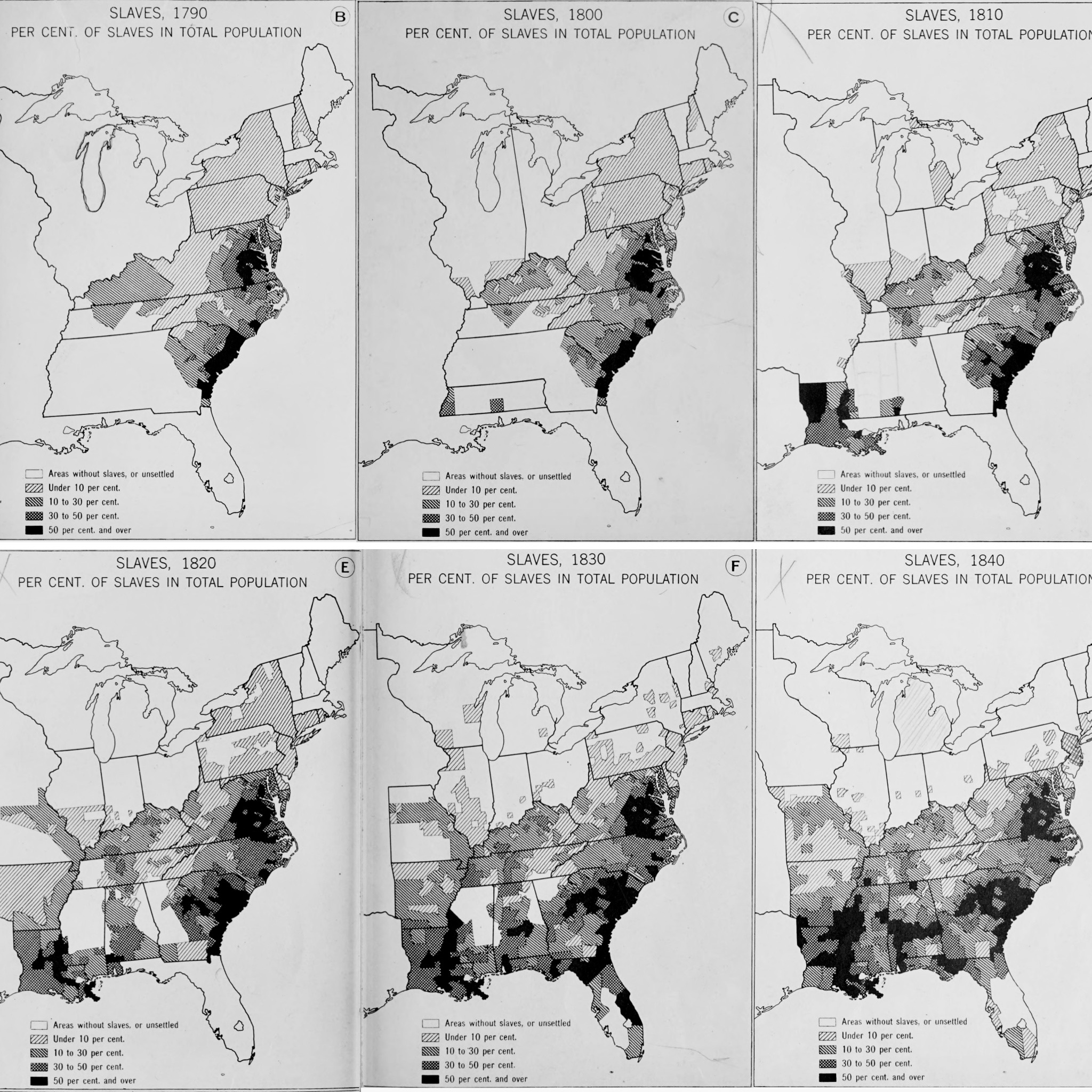
Slaves as a percentage of the total United States population from 1790 to 1840.

As the United States grew, the institution of slavery became more entrenched in the southern states, while northern states began to abolish it. Pennsylvania was the first, in 1780 passing an act for gradual abolition.

Slaves were often sexually abused and raped by their white slave owners. White people often forced slaves to work even when sick. Slaves were not protected from being harassed, sexually stalked or raped by their white masters. Black slaves were also whipped, killed, tortured and had their limbs amputated.

A number of events continued to shape views on slavery. One of these events was the Haitian Revolution, which was the only slave revolt that led to an independent country. Many slave owners fled to the United States with tales of horror and massacre that alarmed Southern whites.

The invention of the cotton gin in the 1790s allowed the cultivation of short staple cotton, which could be grown in much of the Deep South, where warm weather and proper soil conditions prevailed. The industrial revolution in Europe and New England generated a heavy demand for cotton for cheap clothing, which caused an enormous demand for slave labor to develop new cotton plantations. There was a 70% increase in the number of enslaved people in the United States in only 20 years. They were overwhelmingly concentrated on plantations in the Deep South, and moved west as old cotton fields lost their productivity and new lands were purchased. Unlike the Northern States who put more focus into manufacturing and commerce, the South was heavily dependent on agriculture. Southern political economists at this time supported the institution by concluding that nothing was inherently contradictory about owning people and that a future of slavery existed even if the South were to industrialize. Racial, economic, and political turmoil reached an all-time high regarding slavery up to the events of the Civil War.

In 1807, at the urging of President Thomas Jefferson, Congress abolished the importation of enslaved workers. While American Black people celebrated this as a victory in the fight against slavery, the ban increased the internal trade of enslaved people. Changing agricultural practices in the Upper South from tobacco to mixed farming decreased labor requirements, and enslaved people were sold to traders for the developing Deep South. In addition, the Fugitive Slave Act of 1793 allowed any Black person to be claimed as a runaway unless a White person testified on their behalf. A number of free Black people, especially indentured children, were kidnapped and sold into slavery with little or no hope of rescue. The War of 1812 saw 5000–6000 people escape slavery via British ships attacking the United States, with a proportion fighting alongside British forces, which was to prove the largest successful emancipation until 1865. By 1819 there were exactly 11 free and 11 slave states, which increased sectionalism. Fears of an imbalance in Congress led to the 1820 Missouri Compromise that required states to be admitted to the union in pairs, one slave and one free.

In 1831, a rebellion occurred under the leadership of Nat Turner, that lasted four days. During the rebellion, which had been the most deadly in the United States, 55 white people were killed, while 120 black people, most unaffiliated with the rebellion, were killed in a retaliation by soldiers aided by local residents angry at the killings. This led to a fear larger scale rebellions would occur.

In 1850, after winning the Mexican–American War, a problem gripped the nation: what to do about the territories won from Mexico. Henry Clay, the man behind the compromise of 1820, once more rose to the challenge, to craft the compromise of 1850. In this compromise the territories of New Mexico, Arizona, Utah, and Nevada would be organized but the issue of slavery would be decided later. Washington D.C. would abolish the slave trade but not slavery itself. California would be admitted as a free state but the South would receive a new fugitive slave act which required Northerners to return enslaved people who escaped to the North to their owners. The compromise of 1850 would maintain a shaky peace until the election of Lincoln in 1860.

In 1851 the battle between enslaved people and slave owners was met in Lancaster County, Pennsylvania. The Christiana Riot demonstrated the growing conflict between states' rights and Congress on the issue of slavery.

=== Abolitionism ===
Abolitionists in Britain and the United States in the 1840–1860 period developed large, complex campaigns against slavery.

According to Patrick C. Kennicott, the largest and most effective abolitionist speakers were Black people who spoke before the countless local meetings of the National Negro Conventions. They used the traditional arguments against slavery, protesting it on moral, economic, and political grounds. Their role in the antislavery movement not only aided the abolitionist cause but also was a source of pride to the Black community.

In 1852, Harriet Beecher Stowe published a novel that changed how many would view slavery. Uncle Tom's Cabin tells the story of the life of an enslaved person and the brutality that is faced by that life day after day. It would sell over 100,000 copies in its first year. The popularity of Uncle Tom's Cabin would solidify the North in its opposition to slavery, and press forward the abolitionist movement. President Lincoln would later invite Stowe to the White House in honor of this book that changed America.

In 1856 Charles Sumner, a Massachusetts congressmen and antislavery leader, was assaulted and nearly killed on the House floor by Preston Brooks of South Carolina. Sumner had been delivering an abolitionist speech to Congress when Brooks attacked him. Brooks received praise in the South for his actions while Sumner became a political icon in the North. Sumner later returned to the Senate, where he was a leader of the Radical Republicans in ending slavery and legislating equal rights for freed slaves.

Over 1 million enslaved people were moved from the older seaboard slave states, with their declining economies, to the rich cotton states of the southwest; many others were sold and moved locally. Ira Berlin (2000) argues that this Second Middle Passage shredded the planters' paternalist pretenses in the eyes of Black people and prodded enslaved people and free Black people to create a host of oppositional ideologies and institutions that better accounted for the realities of endless deportations, expulsions, and flights that continually remade their world. Benjamin Quarles' work Black Abolitionists provides the most extensive account of the role of Black abolitionists in the American anti-slavery movement.

=== The Black community ===
Black people generally settled in cities, creating the core of Black community life in the region. They established churches and fraternal orders. Many of these early efforts were weak and they often failed, but they represented the initial steps in the evolution of Black communities.

During the early Antebellum period, the creation of free Black communities began to expand, laying out a foundation for African Americans' future. At first, only a few thousand African Americans had their freedom. As the years went by, the number of Blacks being freed expanded tremendously, building to 233,000 by the 1820s. They sometimes sued to gain their freedom or purchased it. Some slave owners freed their bondspeople and a few state legislatures abolished slavery.

African Americans tried to take the advantage of establishing homes and jobs in the cities. During the early 1800s free Black people took several steps to establish fulfilling work lives in urban areas. The rise of industrialization, which depended on power-driven machinery more than human labor, might have afforded them employment, but many owners of textile mills refused to hire Black workers. These owners considered whites to be more reliable and educable. This resulted in many Black people performing unskilled labor. Black men worked as stevedores, construction worker, and as cellar-, well- and grave-diggers. As for Black women workers, they worked as servants for white families. Some women were also cooks, seamstresses, basket-makers, midwives, teachers, and nurses. Black women worked as washerwomen or domestic servants for the white families. Some cities had independent Black seamstresses, cooks, basketmakers, confectioners, and more.

While the African Americans left the thought of slavery behind, they made a priority to reunite with their family and friends. The cause of the Revolutionary War forced many Black people to migrate to the west afterwards, and the scourge of poverty created much difficulty with housing. African Americans competed with the Irish and Germans in jobs and had to share space with them.

While the majority of free Black people lived in poverty, some were able to establish successful businesses that catered to the Black community. Racial discrimination often meant that Black people were not welcome or would be mistreated in White businesses and other establishments. To counter this, Black people like James Forten developed their own communities with Black-owned businesses. Black doctors, lawyers, and other businessmen were the foundation of the Black middle class.

Many Black people organized to help strengthen the Black community and continue the fight against slavery. One of these organizations was the American Society of Free Persons of Colour, founded in 1830. This organization provided social aid to poor Black people and organized responses to political issues. Further supporting the growth of the Black Community was the Black church, usually the first community institution to be established. Starting in the early 1800s with the African Methodist Episcopal Church, African Methodist Episcopal Zion Church and other churches, the Black church grew to be the focal point of the Black community. The Black church was both an expression of community and unique African-American spirituality, and a reaction to European American discrimination. The church also served as neighborhood centers where free Black people could celebrate their African heritage without intrusion by white detractors. The church was the center of the Black communities, but it was also the center of education. Since the church was part of the community and wanted to provide education; they educated the freed and enslaved Black people. At first, Black preachers formed separate congregations within the existing denominations, such as social clubs or literary societies. Because of discrimination at the higher levels of the church hierarchy, some Black people like Richard Allen (bishop) simply founded separate Black denominations. Free Black people also established Black churches in the South before 1800. After the Great Awakening, many Black people joined the Baptist Church, which allowed for their participation, including roles as elders and preachers. For instance, First Baptist Church and Gillfield Baptist Church of Petersburg, Virginia, both had organized congregations by 1800 and were the first Baptist churches in the city. Petersburg, an industrial city, by 1860 had 3,224 free Black people (36% of Black people, and about 26% of all free persons), the largest population in the South. In Virginia, free Black people also created communities in Richmond, Virginia and other towns, where they could work as artisans and create businesses. Others were able to buy land and farm in frontier areas further from white control.

The Black community also established schools for Black children, since they were often banned from entering public schools. Richard Allen organized the first Black Sunday school in America; it was established in Philadelphia during 1795. Then five years later, the priest Absalom Jones established a school for Black youth. Black Americans regarded education as the surest path to economic success, moral improvement and personal happiness. Only the sons and daughters of the Black middle class had the luxury of studying.

=== Haiti's effect on slavery ===
The revolt of enslaved Haitians against their white slave owners, which began in 1791 and lasted until 1801, was a primary source of fuel for both enslaved people and abolitionists arguing for the freedom of Africans in the U.S. In the 1833 edition of Nile's Weekly Register it is stated that freed Black people in Haiti were better off than their Jamaican counterparts, and the positive effects of American Emancipation are alluded to throughout the paper. These anti-slavery sentiments were popular among both white abolitionists and African-American slaves. Enslaved people rallied around these ideas with rebellions against their masters as well as white bystanders during the Denmark Vesey Conspiracy of 1822 and the Nat Turner's Rebellion of 1831. Leaders and plantation owners were also very concerned about the consequences Haiti's revolution would have on early America. Thomas Jefferson, for one, was wary of the "instability of the West Indies", referring to Haiti.

=== Dred Scott v. Sandford ===
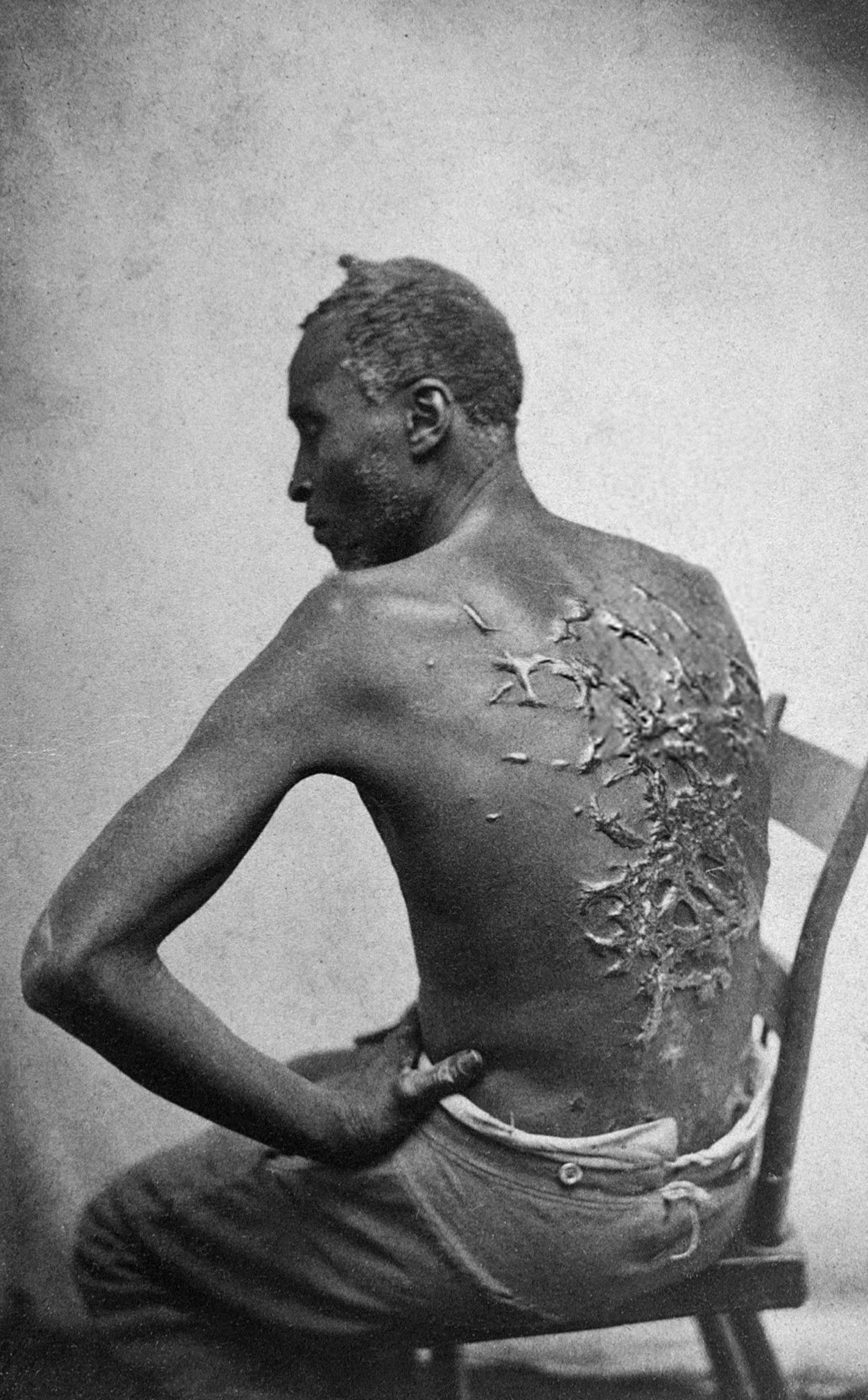
Peter aka Gordon, a former enslaved person, displays the telltale criss-cross, keloid scars from being bullwhipped, 1863.

Dred Scott was an enslaved man whose owner had taken him to live in the free state of Illinois. After his owner's death, Dred Scott sued in court for his freedom on the basis of his having lived in a free state for a long period. The Black community received an enormous shock with the Supreme Court's "Dred Scott" decision in March 1857. Black people were not American citizens and could never be citizens, the court said in a decision roundly denounced by the Republican Party as well as the abolitionists. Because enslaved people were "property, not people", by this ruling they could not sue in court. The decision was finally reversed by the Civil Rights Act of 1865. In what is sometimes considered mere obiter dictum the Court went on to hold that Congress had no authority to prohibit slavery in federal territories because enslaved people are personal property and the Fifth Amendment to the Constitution protects property owners against deprivation of their property without due process of law. Although the Supreme Court has never explicitly overruled the Dred Scott case, the Court stated in the Slaughter-House Cases that at least one part of it had already been overruled by the Fourteenth Amendment in 1868, which begins by stating, "All persons born or naturalized in the United States and subject to the jurisdiction thereof, are citizens of the United States and of the State wherein they reside."

=== Lynchings ===
Black men were often lynched by white men because they were thought to be a threat to white womanhood. The stereotype of Black men being dangerous rapists with a large penis with a lustful nature bent on white women was prevalent in the South. Emmett Till was lynched for allegedly flirting with a white woman in Mississippi.

== American Civil War, emancipation, and reconstruction ==
The Emancipation Proclamation was an executive order issued by President Abraham Lincoln on January 1, 1863. In a single stroke it changed the legal status, as recognized by the U.S. government, of 3 million enslaved people in designated areas of the Confederacy from "slave" to "free." Its practical effect was that as soon as an enslaved person escaped from slavery, by running away or through advances of federal troops, the enslaved person became legally and actually free. The owners were never compensated. Plantation owners, realizing that emancipation would destroy their economic system, sometimes moved their enslaved people as far as possible out of reach of the Union army. By June 1865, the Union Army controlled all of the Confederacy and liberated all the designated enslaved people.

About 200,000 free Black people and former enslaved people served in the Union Army and Navy, thus providing a basis for a claim to full citizenship. The dislocations of war and Reconstruction had a severe negative impact on the Black population, with much sickness and death.

=== Reconstruction ===
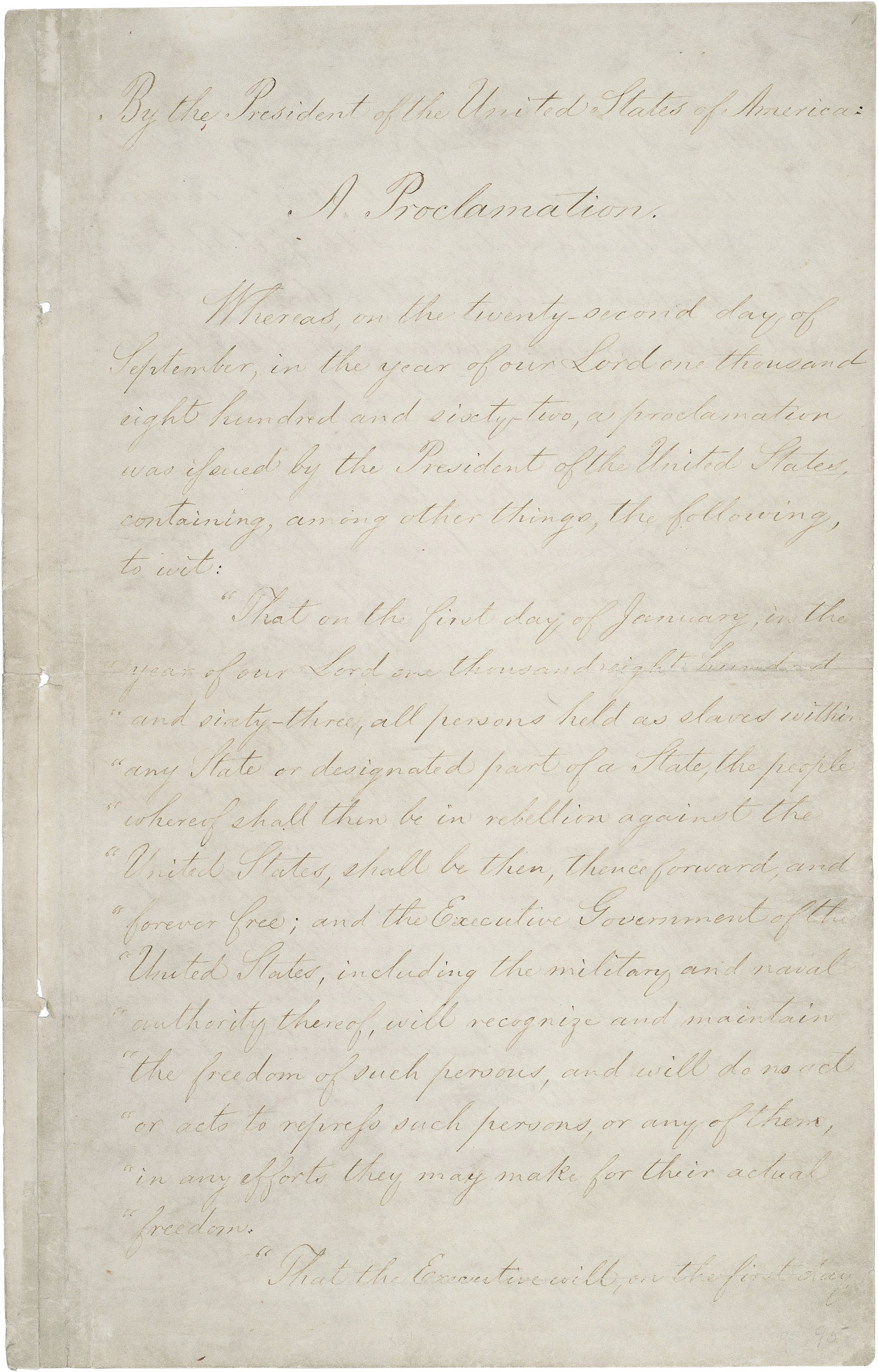
The Emancipation Proclamation

The Civil Rights Act of 1866 made Black people full U.S. citizens (and this repealed the Dred Scott decision). In 1868, the 14th Amendment granted full U.S. citizenship to African Americans. The 15th Amendment, ratified in 1870, extended the right to vote to Black males. The Freedmen's Bureau was an important institution established to create social and economic order in Southern states.

After the Union victory over the Confederacy, a brief period of Southern Black progress, called Reconstruction, followed. During Reconstruction, the states that had seceded were readmitted into the Union. From 1865 to 1877, under the protection of Union troops, some strides were made toward equal rights for African Americans. Southern Black men began to vote and they were also elected to serve in the United States Congress as well as in local offices such as the office of sheriff. The safety which was provided by the troops did not last long, however, and white Southerners frequently terrorized Black voters. Coalitions of white and Black Republicans passed bills in order to establish the first public school systems in most states of the South, although sufficient funding was hard to find. Black people established their own churches, towns, and businesses. Tens of thousands migrated to Mississippi for the chance to clear and own their own land, as 90 percent of the bottomlands were undeveloped. By the end of the 19th century, two-thirds of the farmers who owned land in the Mississippi Delta bottomlands were Black.

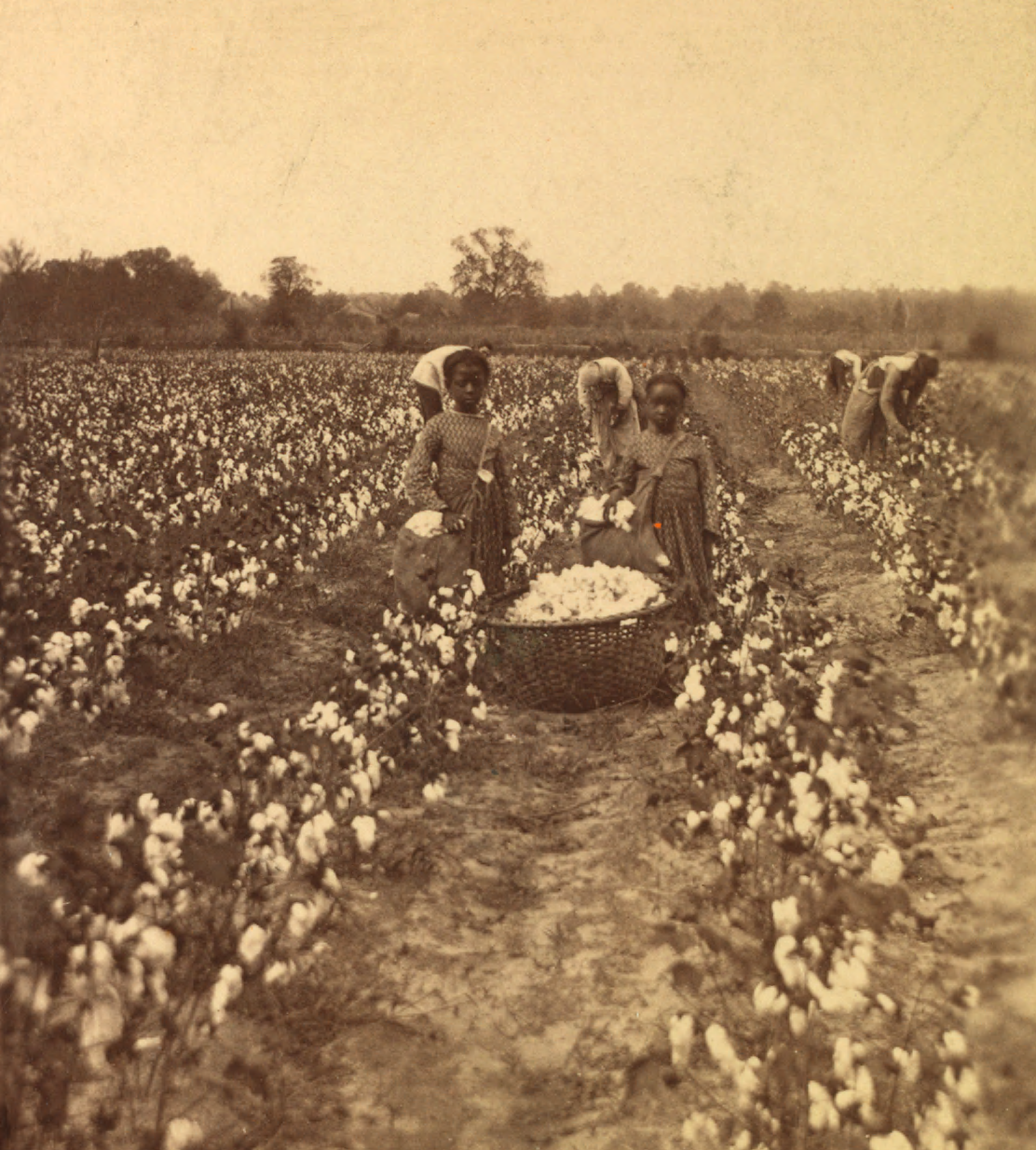
African-American children in South Carolina picking cotton, c. 1870

Hiram Revels became the first African-American senator in the U.S. Congress in 1870. Other African Americans soon came to Congress from South Carolina, Georgia, Alabama, and Mississippi. These new politicians supported the Republicans and tried to bring further improvements to the lives of African Americans. Revels and others understood that white people may have felt threatened by the African-American congressmen. Revels stated, "The white race has no better friend than I. I am true to my own race. I wish to see all done that can be done...to assist [Black men]in acquiring property, in becoming intelligent, enlightened citizens...but at the same time, I would not have anything done which would harm the white race," Blanche K. Bruce was the other African American who became a U.S. senator during this period. African Americans elected to the House of Representatives during this time included Benjamin S. Turner, Josiah T. Walls, Joseph H. Rainey, Robert Brown Elliot, Robert D. De Large, and Jefferson H. Long. Frederick Douglass also served in the different government jobs during Reconstruction, including Minister Resident and Counsel General to Haiti, Recorder of Deeds, and U.S. Marshall. Bruce became a Senator in 1874 and represented the state of Mississippi. He worked with white politicians from his region in order to hopefully help his fellow African Americans and other minority groups such as Chinese immigrants and Native Americans. He even supported efforts to end restrictions on former Confederates' political participation.

The aftermath of the Civil War accelerated the process of a national African-American identity formation. Some civil rights activists, such as W. E. B. Du Bois, disagree that identity was achieved after the Civil War. African Americans in the post-Civil War era were faced with many rules and regulations that, even though they were "free", prevented them from enjoying the same amount of freedom as white citizens had. Tens of thousands of Black northerners left homes and careers and also migrated to the defeated South, building schools, printing newspapers, and opening businesses. As Joel Williamson puts it:

Many of the migrants, women as well as men, came as teachers sponsored by a dozen or so benevolent societies, arriving in the still turbulent wake of Union armies. Others came to organize relief for the refugees.... Still others ... came south as religious missionaries.... Some came south as business or professional people seeking opportunity on this ... special Black frontier. Finally, thousands came as soldiers, and when the war was over, many of [their] young men remained there or after a stay of some months in the North, they returned in order to complete their education.

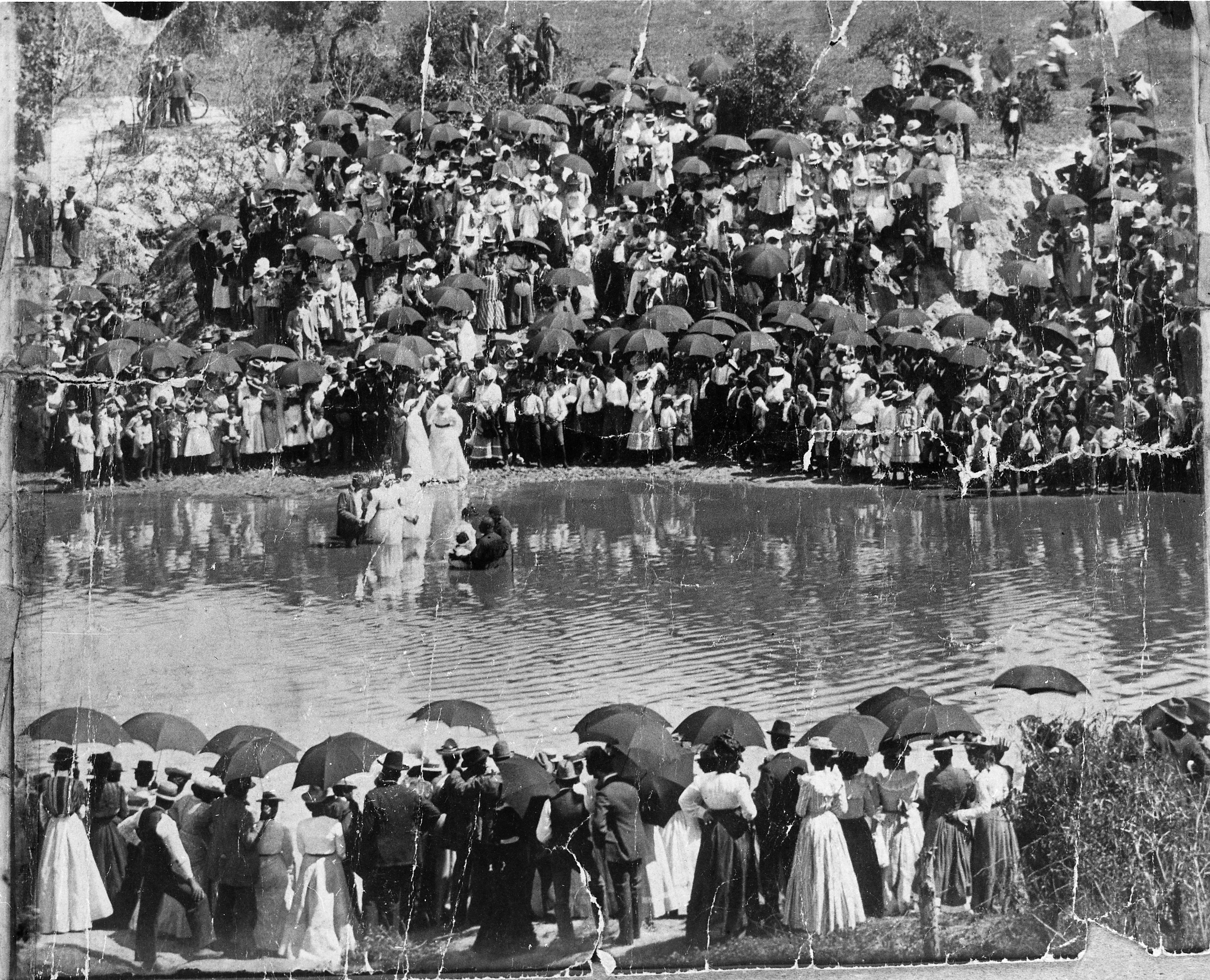
A large group of African-American spectators stands on the banks of Buffalo Bayou to witness a baptism (c. 1900).

== Nadir of American race relations ==
The Jim Crow laws were state and local laws in the United States enacted between 1876 and 1965. They mandated de jure segregation in all public facilities, with a supposedly "separate but equal" status for Black Americans. In reality, this led to treatment and accommodations that were usually inferior to those provided for white Americans, systematizing a number of economic, educational and social disadvantages.

In the face of years of mounting violence and intimidation directed at Blacks as well as whites sympathetic to their cause, the U.S. government retreated from its pledge to guarantee constitutional protections to freedmen and women. When President Rutherford B. Hayes withdrew Union troops from the South in 1877 as a result of a national compromise on the election, Black people lost most of their political power. Men like Benjamin "Pap" Singleton began speaking of leaving the South. This idea culminated in the 1879–80 movement of the Exodusters, who migrated to Kansas, where Blacks had much more freedom and it was easier to acquire land.

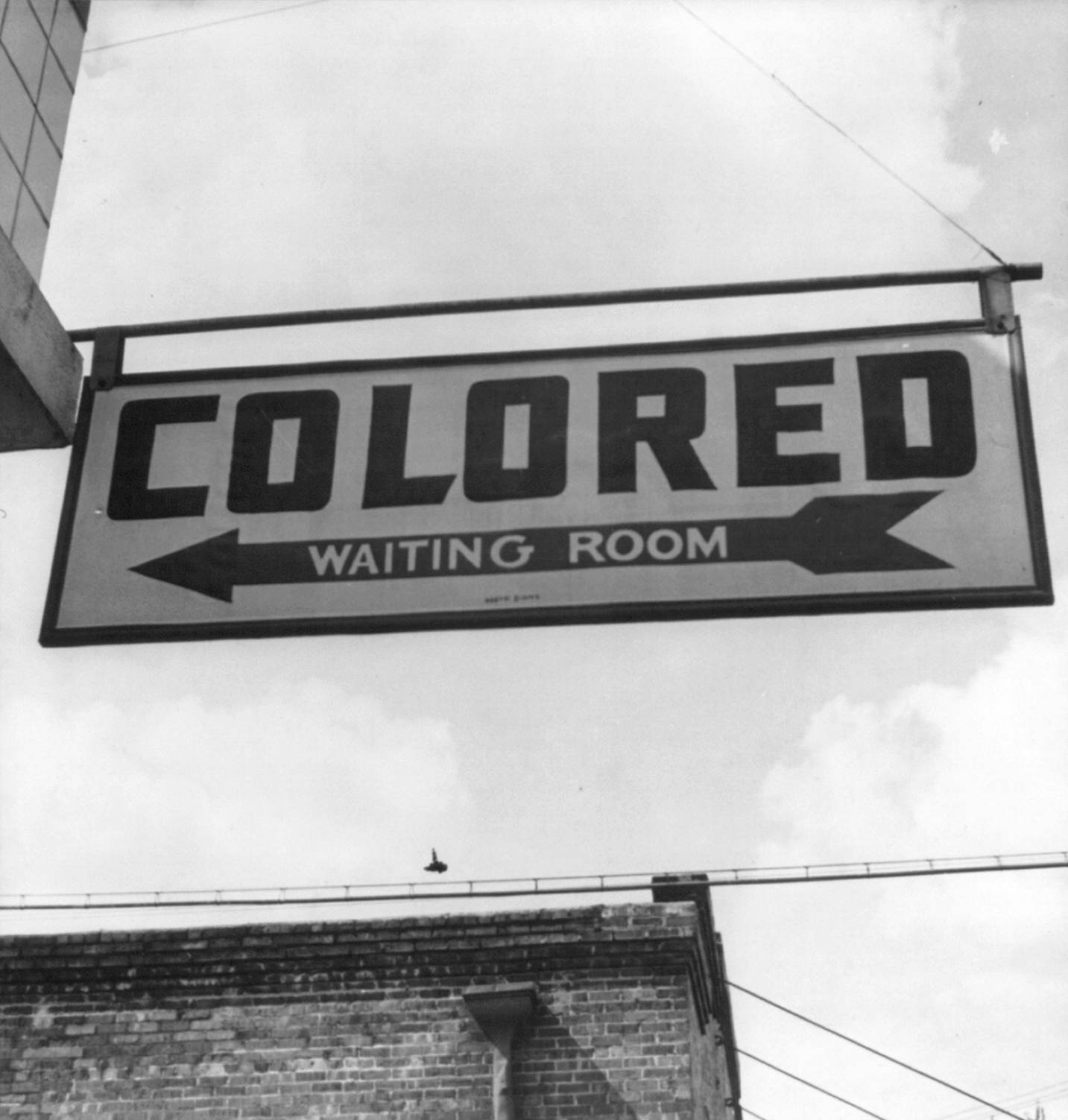
Sign for "Colored waiting room" at a bus station in Georgia, 1943

When Democrats took control of Tennessee in 1888, they passed laws making voter registration more complicated and reduced two-party competition in the South. Voting by Black people in rural areas and small towns dropped sharply, as did voting by poor whites.

From 1890 to 1908, starting with Mississippi and ending with Georgia, ten of eleven Southern states adopted new constitutions or amendments that effectively disenfranchised most Black people and many poor whites. Using a combination of provisions such as poll taxes, residency requirements and literacy tests, states dramatically decreased Black voter registration and turnout, in some cases to zero. The grandfather clause was used in many states temporarily to exempt illiterate white voters from literacy tests. As power became concentrated under the Democratic Party in the South, the party positioned itself as a private club and instituted white primaries, closing Black people out of the only competitive contests. By 1910 one-party white rule was firmly established across the South.

Although African Americans quickly started litigation to challenge such provisions, early court decisions at the state and national level went against them. In Williams v. Mississippi (1898), the US Supreme Court upheld state provisions. This encouraged other Southern states to adopt similar measures over the next few years, as noted above. Booker T. Washington, of Tuskegee Institute secretly worked with Northern supporters to raise funds and provide representation for African Americans in additional cases, such as Giles v. Harris (1903) and Giles v. Teasley (1904), but again the Supreme Court upheld the states.

Segregation for the first time became a standard legal process in the South; it was informal in Northern cities. Jim Crow limited Black access to transportation, schools, restaurants and other public facilities. Most southern blacks for decades continued to struggle in grinding poverty as agricultural, domestic and menial laborers. Many became sharecroppers, sharing the crop with the white land owners..

=== Racial terrorism ===
In 1865, the Ku Klux Klan, a secret white supremacist criminal organization dedicated to destroying the Republican Party in the South, especially by terrorizing Black leaders, was formed. Klansmen hid behind masks and robes to hide their identity while they carried out violence and property damage. The Klan used terrorism, especially murder and threats of murder, arson and intimidation. The Klan's excesses led to the passage of legislation against it, and with Federal enforcement, it was destroyed by 1871.

The anti-Republican and anti-freedmen sentiment only briefly went underground, as violence arose in other incidents, especially after Louisiana's disputed state election in 1872, which contributed to the Colfax and Coushatta massacres in Louisiana in 1873 and 1874. Tensions and rumors were high in many parts of the South. When violence erupted, African Americans consistently were killed at a much higher rate than were European Americans. Historians of the 20th century have renamed events long called "riots" in southern history. The common stories featured whites heroically saving the community from marauding Black people. Upon examination of the evidence, historians have called numerous such events "massacres", as at Colfax, because of the disproportionate number of fatalities for Black people as opposed to whites. The mob violence there resulted in 40–50 Black people dead for each of the three whites killed.

While not as widely known as the Klan, the paramilitary organizations that arose in the South during the mid-1870s as the white Democrats mounted a stronger insurgency, were more directed and effective than the Klan in challenging Republican governments, suppressing the Black vote and achieving political goals. Unlike the Klan, paramilitary members operated openly, often solicited newspaper coverage, and had distinct political goals: to turn Republicans out of office and suppress or dissuade Black voting in order to regain power in 1876. Groups included the White League, that started from white militias in Grant Parish, Louisiana, in 1874 and spread in the Deep South; the Red Shirts, that started in Mississippi in 1875 but had chapters arise and was prominent in the 1876 election campaign in South Carolina, as well as in North Carolina; and other White Line organizations such as rifle clubs.

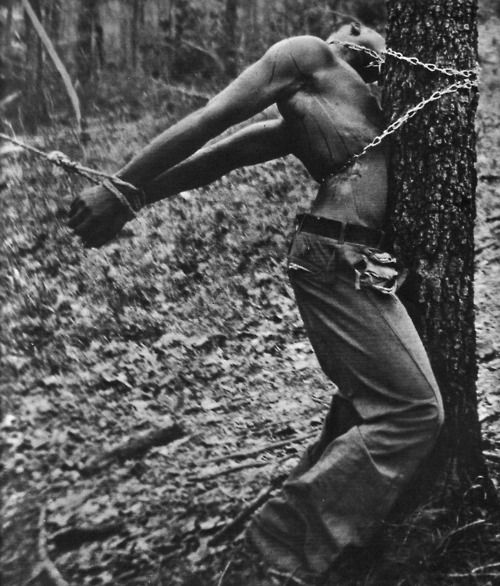
Robert McDaniels lynched. Apr. 13, 1937

The Jim Crow era accompanied the most cruel wave of "racial" suppression that America has yet experienced. Between 1890 and 1940, millions of African Americans were disenfranchised, killed, and brutalized. According to newspaper records kept at the Tuskegee Institute, about 5,000 men, women, and children were murdered in documented extrajudicial mob violence—called "lynchings." The journalist Ida B. Wells estimated that lynchings not reported by the newspapers, plus similar executions under the veneer of "due process", may have amounted to about 20,000 killings.

Of the tens of thousands of lynchers and onlookers during this period, it is reported that fewer than 50 whites were ever indicted for their crimes, and only four were sentenced. Because Black people were disenfranchised, they could not sit on juries or have any part in the political process, including local offices. Meanwhile, the lynchings were used as a weapon of terror to keep millions of African-Americans living in a constant state of anxiety and fear. Most Black people were denied their right to keep and bear arms under Jim Crow laws, and they were therefore unable to protect themselves or their families.

== Great Migration and the Harlem Renaissance ==
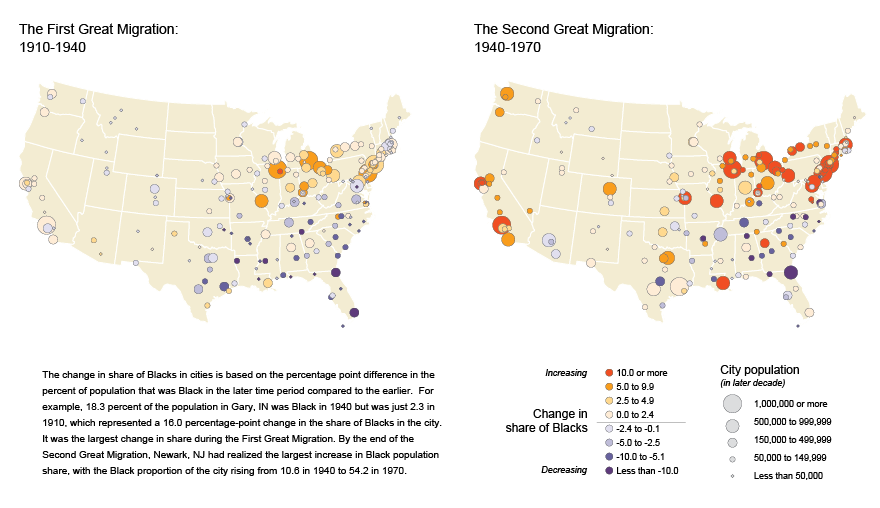
The Great Migration shown through changes in African American share of population in major U.S. cities, 1910–1940 and 1940–1970

During the first half of the 20th century, the largest internal population shift in U.S. history took place. Starting about 1910, through the Great Migration over five million African Americans made choices and "voted with their feet" by moving from the South to northern and western cities in hopes of escaping political discrimination and hatred, violence, finding better jobs, voting and enjoying greater equality and education for their children.

In the 1920s, the concentration of Black people in New York led to the cultural movement known as the Harlem Renaissance, whose influence reached nationwide. Black intellectual and cultural circles were influenced by thinkers such as Aimé Césaire and Léopold Sédar Senghor, who celebrated Blackness, or négritude; arts and letters flourished. Writers Zora Neale Hurston, Langston Hughes, Nella Larsen, Claude McKay and Richard Wright; and artists Lois Mailou Jones, William H. Johnson, Romare Bearden, Jacob Lawrence and Archibald Motley gained prominence.

The South Side of Chicago, a destination for many on the trains up from Mississippi, Arkansas and Louisiana, joined Harlem as a sort of Black capital for the nation. It generated flourishing businesses, music, arts and foods. A new generation of powerful African-American political leaders and organizations also came to the fore, Typified by Congressman William Dawson (1886–1970). Membership in the NAACP rapidly increased as it mounted an anti-lynching campaign in reaction to ongoing southern white violence against blacks. Marcus Garvey's Universal Negro Improvement Association and African Communities League, the Nation of Islam, and union organizer A. Philip Randolph's Brotherhood of Sleeping Car Porters (part of the American Federation of labor) all were established during this period and found support among African Americans, who became urbanized.

Jews and African Americans often lived in the same neighborhoods and cities, frequently sharing similar housing options due to poverty. Jews, who were not always seen as fully white and had less experience with American racism, tended to be less violent and were often influenced by egalitarian beliefs such as communism, socialism, and trade unionism. As a result, they generally resisted less when African Americans moved into their areas. Consequently, many Jewish neighborhoods gradually became predominantly Black, usually with some tension but typically without violence.

== Black-owned businesses ==
Businesses operated at the local level, and included beauty shops, barber shops, funeral parlors and the like. Booker T. Washington organized them nationally into the National Negro Business League. The more ambitious Black businessman with a larger vision avoided small towns and rural areas and headed to progressive large cities. They sent their children to elite Black colleges such as Howard, Spellman, and Morehouse; by the 1970s they were accepted in more than token numbers at national schools such as the Ivy League. Graduates were hired by major national corporations. They were active in the Urban League, the United Negro College Fund and the NAACP, and were much more likely to be Episcopalians than Baptists.

=== Women in the beauty business ===
Although most prominent African-American businesses have been owned by men, women played a major role especially in the area of beauty. Standards of beauty were different for whites and Black people, and the Black community developed its own standards, with an emphasis on hair care. Beauticians could work out of their own homes, and did not need storefronts. As a result, Black beauticians were numerous in the rural South, despite the absence of cities and towns. They pioneered the use of cosmetics, at a time when rural white women in the South avoided them. As Blain Roberts has shown, beauticians offered their clients a space to feel pampered and beautiful in the context of their own community because, "Inside Black beauty shops, rituals of beautification converged with rituals of socialization." Beauty contests emerged in the 1920s, and in the white community they were linked to agricultural county fairs. By contrast in the Black community, beauty contests were developed out of the homecoming ceremonies at their high schools and colleges. The most famous entrepreneur was Madame C. J. Walker (1867–1919); she built a national franchise business called Madame C. J. Walker Manufacturing Company based on her invention of the first successful hair straightening process.

== World Wars and new deal ==
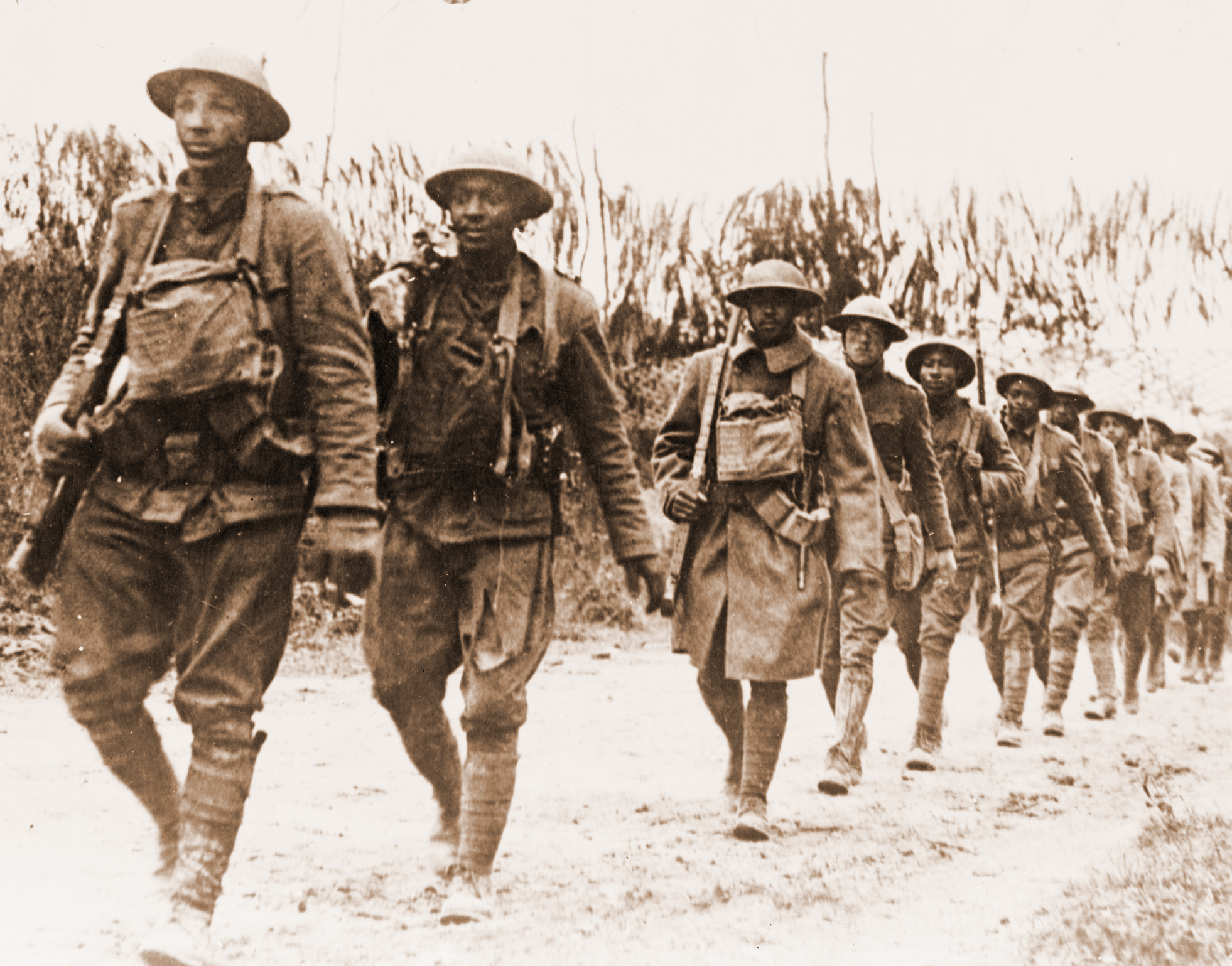
African-American soldiers of the U.S. Army marching northwest of Verdun, France 5 November 1918

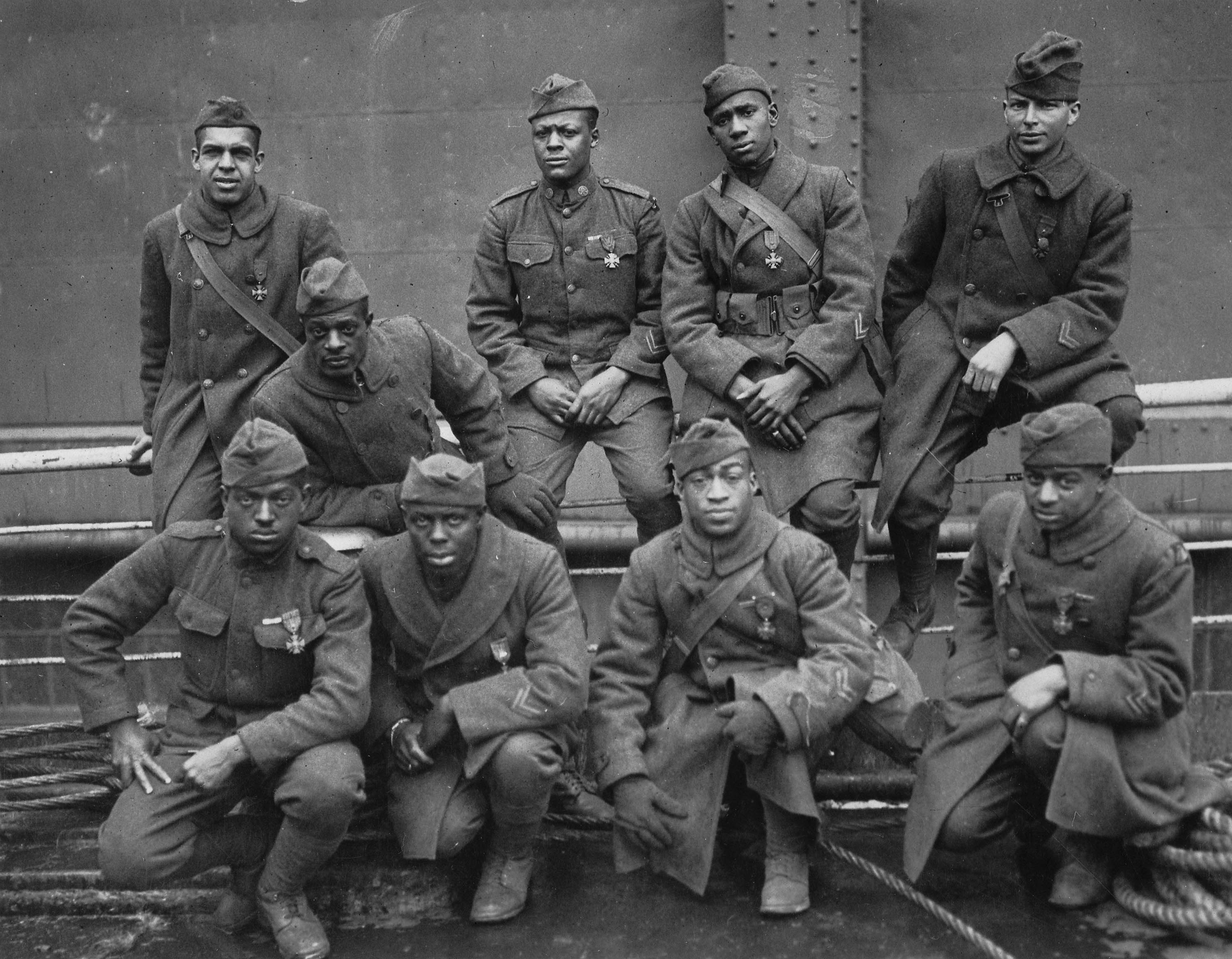
Soldiers of the 369th (15th N.Y.) who won the Croix de Guerre for gallantry in action, 1919

=== Soldiers ===
The U.S. armed forces remained segregated during World War I. Still, many African Americans eagerly volunteered to join the Allied cause following America's entry into the war. More than two million African-American men rushed to register for the draft. By the time of the armistice with Germany in November 1918, over 350,000 African Americans had served with the American Expeditionary Force on the Western Front.

Most African American units were relegated to support roles and did not see combat. Still, African Americans played a significant role in America's war effort. Four African American regiments were integrated into French units because the French suffered heavy losses and badly needed men after three years of a terrible war. One of the most distinguished units was the 369th Infantry Regiment, known as the "Harlem Hellfighters", which was on the front lines for six months, longer than any other American unit in the war. 171 members of the 369th were awarded the Legion of Merit.

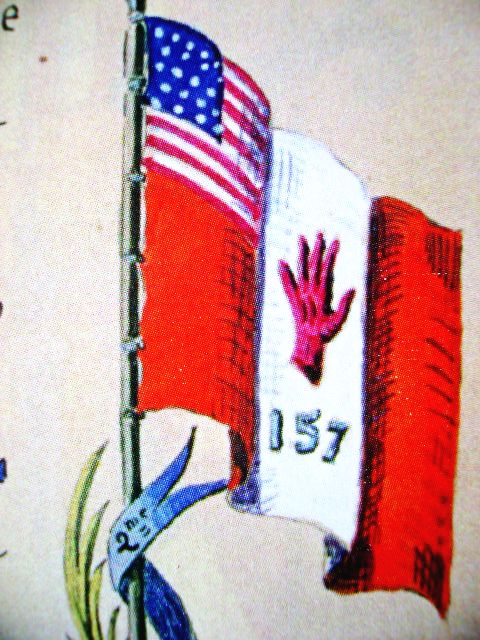
157th I.D. Red Hand flag drawn by General Mariano Goybet

From May 1918 to November 1918, the 371st and the 372nd American Regiments were integrated under the 157th Red Hand Division commanded by the French General Mariano Goybet. He was awarded the Distinguished Service Medal (U.S. Army) by General Pershing. The African American Regiments earned glory in the decisive final offensive in Champagne region of France. The two Regiments were decorated by the French Croix de Guerre for their gallantry in the Meuse-Argonne Offensive.

December 12, 1918

General Order No. 245

"The red hand division during nine days of violent fight was always an exceptional model for the victorious advance of the fourth army. Dear Friends of America you will be back home to the other side of the ocean, don't forget The Red Hand Division."

"Our friendship has been cemented in the blood of the brave and such a link will be never destroyed Remember your General who is proud to have commanded you and be sure of his endless recognition."

— General Goybet, commanding the 157th Division.

During World War I, the 372nd Infantry Regiment was composed of segregated National Guard units as well as draftees.

Among these National Guard units, the 1st District of Columbia was re-designated the 1st Battalion of the 372nd Infantry.

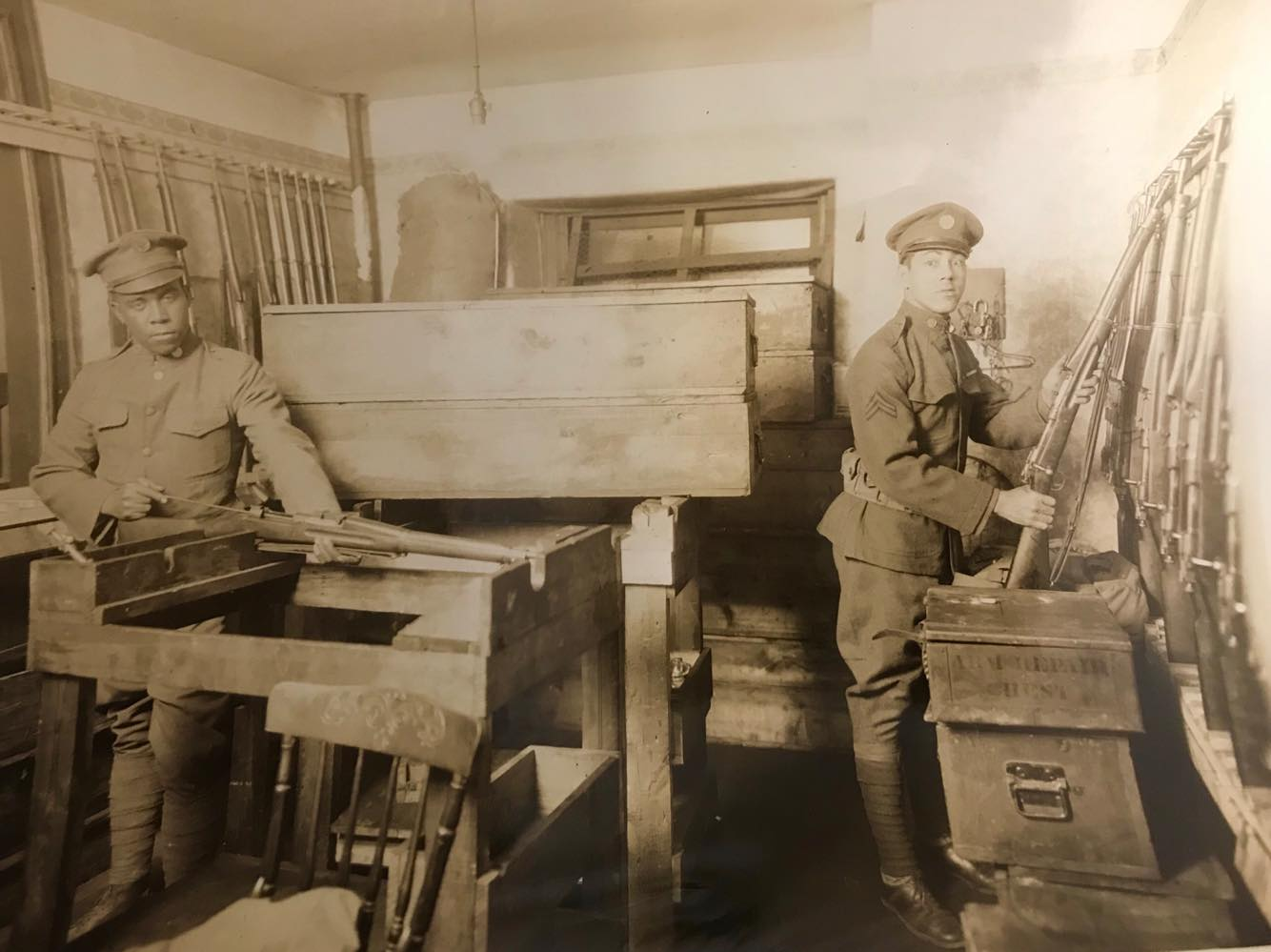
Enlisted men of the 1st Separate Battalion, an all African-American unit, examining weapons in the old army arms room prior to World War I

In 1917, fearing espionage, D.C. National Guard elements were mobilized 12 days before the U.S. officially entered World War I to protect reservoirs and power plants around District of Columbia Military officials were concerned that too many of the D.C. units were made up of men with foreign roots, thus the job of protecting vital facilities fell to the all-black 1st Separate Infantry, the only unit the military believed could be trusted with this mission.

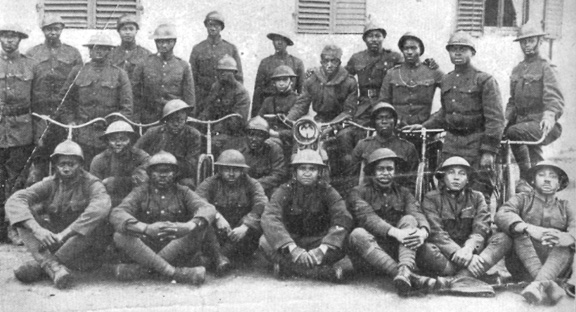
Colored messengers of Motorcycle Corps, 372nd Headquarters, who kept communication lines alive at all hours during the big drive in Champagne, Argonne and at Verdun

Eventually the 1st Separate was mustered into active service and re-designated the 1st Battalion of the 372nd Infantry. In France, unsure of what to do with an African-American regiment, the 372nd was attached to the French Army's 157th "Red Hand" Division. The soldiers fought in Meuse-Argonne, Lorraine and Alsace, where they were awarded the Croix de Guerre—one of the highest honors bestowed by the French military. Général Goybet, the 157th commanding general, gave the unit a Red Hand insignia in honor of their service. The red hand appears today on the crest of the 372nd Military Police Battalion. Although many D.C. National Guard units were mobilized, the 372nd was the only one to actually see combat during the war.

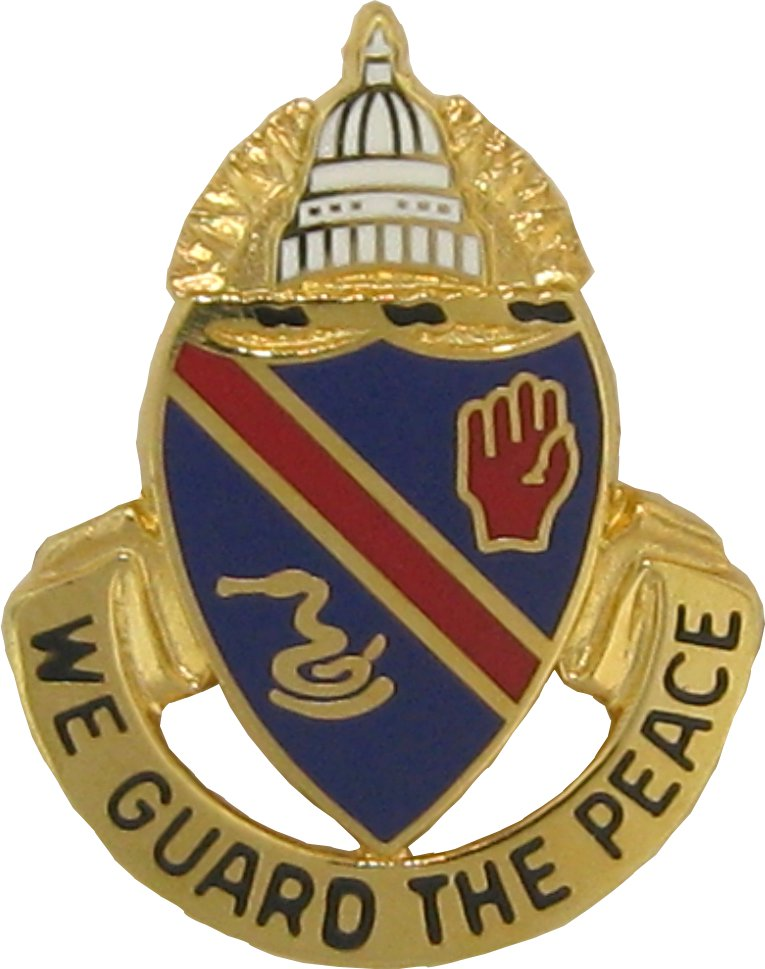
Distinctive unit Insignia: 372 MP Bn. Red hand on right side

Corporal Freddie Stowers of the 371st Infantry Regiment was posthumously awarded a Medal of Honor—the first African American to be so honored for actions in World War I. During action in France, Stowers had led an assault on German trenches, continuing to lead and encourage his men even after being wounded twice. Stowers died from his wounds, but his men continued the fight on a German machine gun nest near Bussy farm in Champagne, and eventually defeated the German troops.

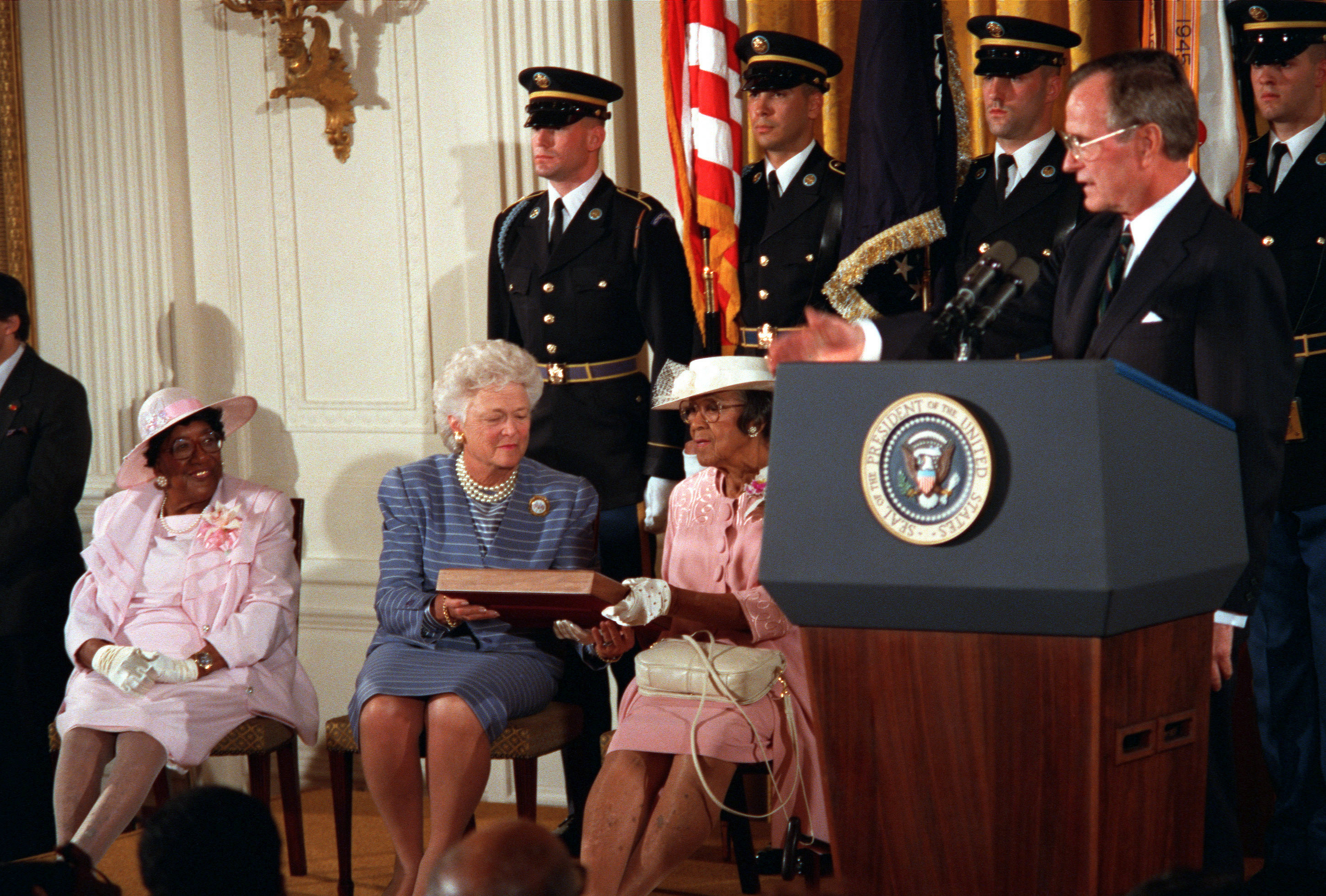
Freddie Stowers' sisters, Georgina Palmer and Mary Bowens, with Barbara Bush and President George H.W. Bush at the Medal of Honor presentation ceremony in 1991

Stowers was recommended for the Medal of Honor shortly after his death, but according to the Army, the nomination was misplaced. Many believed the recommendation had been intentionally ignored due to institutional racism in the Armed Forces. In 1990, under pressure from Congress, the Defense Department launched an investigation. Based on findings from this investigation, the Army Decorations Board approved the award of the Medal of Honor to Stowers. On April 24, 1991–73 years after he was killed in action—Stowers' two surviving sisters received the Medal of Honor from President George H. W. Bush at the White House.

=== Home front and postwar ===
With an enormous demand for expansion of the defense industries, the new draft law in effect, and the cut off of immigration from Europe, demand was very high for underemployed farmers from the South. Hundreds of thousands of African-Americans took the trains to Northern industrial centers in a dramatic historical event known as the Great Migration. Migrants going to Pittsburgh and surrounding mill towns in western Pennsylvania between 1890 and 1930 faced racial discrimination and limited economic opportunities. The Black population in Pittsburgh jumped from 6,000 in 1880 to 27,000 in 1910. Many took highly paid, skilled jobs in the steel mills. Pittsburgh's Black population increased to 37,700 in 1920 (6.4% of the total) while the Black element in Homestead, Rankin, Braddock, and others nearly doubled. They succeeded in building effective community responses that enabled the survival of new communities. Historian Joe Trotter explains the decision process:

Although African-Americans often expressed their views of the Great Migration in biblical terms and received encouragement from northern black newspapers, railroad companies, and industrial labor agents, they also drew upon family and friendship networks to help in the move to Western Pennsylvania. They formed migration clubs, pooled their money, bought tickets at reduced rates, and often moved ingroups. Before they made the decision to move, they gathered information and debated the pros and cons of the process....In barbershops, poolrooms, and grocery stores, in churches, lodge halls, and clubhouses, and in private homes, southern blacks discussed, debated, and decided what was good and what was bad about moving to the urban North.

After the war ended and the soldiers returned home, tensions were very high, with serious labor union strikes and inter-racial riots in major cities. The summer of 1919 was known as the Red Summer with outbreaks of racial violence killing about 1,000 people across the nation, most of whom were Black.

Nevertheless, the newly established Black communities in the North nearly all endured. Joe Trotter explains how the Blacks built new institutions for their new communities in the Pittsburgh area:

Black churches, fraternal orders, and newspapers (especially the Pittsburgh Courier); organizations such as the NAACP, Urban League, and Garvey Movement; social clubs, restaurants, and baseball teams; hotels, beauty shops, barber shops, and taverns, all proliferated.

=== New Deal ===
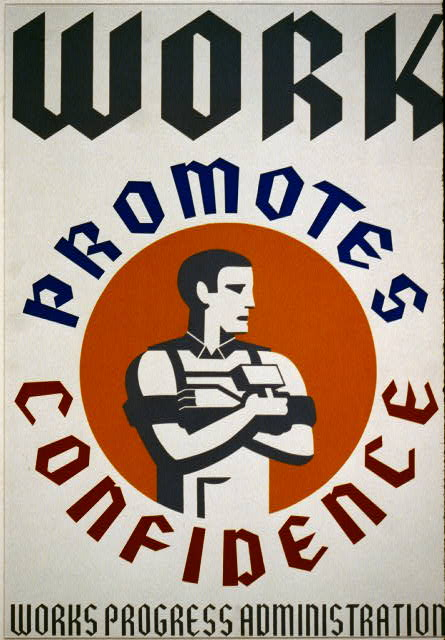
WPA poster promoting the benefits of employment

The Great Depression hit Black America hard. In 1930, it was reported that 4 out of 5 Black people lived in the South, the average life expectancy for Black people was 15 years less than whites, and the Black infant mortality rate at 12% was double that of whites. In Chicago, Black people made up 4% of the population and 16% of the unemployed while in Pittsburgh blacks were 8% of the population and 40% of the unemployed. In January 1934, the journalist Lorena Hickok reported from rural Georgia that she had seen "half-starved Whites and Blacks struggle in competition for less to eat than my dog gets at home, for the privilege of living in huts that are infinitely less comfortable than his kennel". She also described most Southern Black people who made worked as sharecroppers as living under a system very close to slavery. A visiting British journalist wrote she "had traveled over most of Europe and part of Africa, but I have never seen such terrible sights as I saw yesterday among the sharecroppers of Arkansas".

The New Deal did not have a specific program for Black people only, but it sought to incorporate them in all the relief programs that it began. The most important relief agencies were the CCC for young men (who worked in segregated units), the FERA relief programs in 1933–35 (run by local towns and cities), and especially the WPA, which employed 2,000,000 or more workers nationwide under federal control, 1935–42. All races had had the same wage rates and working conditions in the WPA.

A rival federal agency was the Public Works Administration (PWA), headed by long-time civil rights activist Harold Ickes. It set quotas for private firms hiring skilled and unskilled Black people in construction projects financed through the PWA, overcoming the objections of labor unions. In this way, the New Deal ensured that blacks were 13% of the unskilled PWA jobs in Chicago, 60% in Philadelphia and 71% in Jacksonville, Florida; their share of the skilled jobs was 4%, 6%, and 17%, respectively. In the Department of Agriculture, there was a lengthy bureaucratic struggle in 1933–35 between one faction which favored rising prices for farmers vs. another faction which favored reforms to assist sharecroppers, especially Black ones. When one Agriculture Department official, Alger Hiss, in early 1935 wrote up a directive to ensure that Southern landlords were paying sharecroppers for their labor (which most of them did not), Senator Ellison D. Smith stormed into his office and shouted: "Young fella, you can't do this to my niggers, paying checks to them". The Agriculture Secretary, Henry A. Wallace, sided with Smith and agreed to cancel the directive. As it turned out, the most effective way for Black sharecroppers to escape a life of poverty in the South was to move to the North or California.

An immediate response was a shift in the Black vote in Northern cities from the GOP to the Democrats (blacks seldom voted in the South.) In Southern states where few Black people voted, Black leaders seized the opportunity to work inside the new federal agencies as social workers and administrators, with an eye to preparing a new generation who would become leaders of grass-roots constituencies that could be mobilized at some future date for civil rights. President Franklin D. Roosevelt appointed the first federal black judge, William H. Hastie, and created an unofficial "black cabinet" led by Mary McLeod Bethune to advise him. Roosevelt ordered that federal agencies such as the CCC, WPA and PWA were not to discriminate against Black Americans. The president's wife, Eleanor Roosevelt (who was a close friend of Bethune's), was notably sympathetic towards African-Americans and constantly in private urged her husband to do more to try help Black Americans. The fact that the Civil Works Administration paid the same wages to Black workers as white workers sparked much resentment in the South and as early as 1933 conservative Southern politicians who claiming that federal relief payments were causing Black people to move to the cities to become a "permanent welfare class". Studies showed that Black people were twice likely to be unemployed as whites, and one-fifth of all people receiving federal relief payments were Black, which was double their share of the population.

In Chicago the Black community had been a stronghold of the Republican machine, but in the Great Depression the machine fell apart. Voters and leaders moved en masse into the Democratic Party as the New Deal offered relief programs and the city Democratic machine offered suitable positions in the Democratic Party for leaders such as William Dawson, who went to Congress.

Militants demanded a federal anti-lynching bill, but President Roosevelt knew it would never pass Congress but would split his New Deal coalition. Because conservative white Southerners tended to vote as a bloc for the Democratic Party with all of the Senators and Congressmen from the South in the 1930s being Democrats, this tended to pull the national Democratic Party to the right on many issues while Southern politicians formed a powerful bloc in Congress. When a Black minister, Marshall L. Shepard, delivered the opening prayer at the Democratic National Convention in Philadelphia in 1936, Senator Ellison D. Smith stormed out, screaming: "This mongrel meeting ain't no place for a white man!" Though Smith's reaction was extreme, other Democratic politicians from the South made it clear to Roosevelt that they were very displeased. In the 1936 election, African-Americans who could vote overwhelmingly did so for Roosevelt, marking the first time that a Democratic candidate for president had won the Black vote.

In November 1936, the American duo Buck and Bubbles became the first Black people to appear on television, albeit on a British television channel.

In April 1937, Congressman Earl C. Michener read out on the floor of the House of Representatives an account of the lynching of Roosevelt Townes and Robert McDaniels in Duck Hill, Mississippi on 13 April 1937, describing in much detail how a white mob tied two Black men to a tree, tortured them with blowtorches, and finally killed them. Michener introduced an anti-lynching bill that passed the House, but which was stopped in the Senate as Southern senators filibustered the bill until it was withdrawn on 21 February 1938. Both civil rights leaders and the First Lady, Eleanor Roosevelt, pressed President Roosevelt to support the anti-lynching bill, but his support was half-hearted at best. Roosevelt told Walter Francis White of the NAACP that he personally supported the anti-lynching bill, but that: "I did not choose the tools with which I must work. Had I been permitted to choose them I would have selected quite different ones. But I've got to get legislation passed to save America. The Southerners by reason of the seniority rule in Congress are chairmen or occupy strategic places on most of the Senate and House committees. If I came out for the antilynching bill now, they will block every bill I ask Congress to pass to keep America from collapsing. I just can't take the risk".

Through Roosevelt was sympathetic, and his wife even more so towards the plight of African-Americans, but the power of the Southern Democratic bloc in Congress, whom he did not wish to take on, limited his options. Through not explicitly designed to assist Black Americans, Roosevelt supported the Fair Labor Standards Act of 1938, which imposed a national minimum wage of 40 cents per hour and a forty-hour work week while banning child labor, which was intended to assist poorer Americans. The Southern congressional bloc were vehemently opposed to the Fair Labor Standards Act, which they saw as an attack on the entire Southern way of life, which was based upon extremely low wages (for example the minimum wage was 50 cents per day in South Carolina), and caused some of them to break with Roosevelt. In 1938, Roosevelt campaigned in the Democratic primaries to defeat three conservative Southern Democratic senators, Walter F. George, Millard Tydings, and Ellison "Cotton Ed" Smith, whom were all returned. Later in 1938, the conservative Southern Democrats allied themselves with conservative Republicans, forming an alliance in Congress which sharply limited Roosevelt's ability to pass liberal legislation.

=== Cotton ===
The largest group of Black people worked in the cotton farms of the Deep South as sharecroppers or tenant farmers; a few owned their farms. Large numbers of whites also were tenant farmers and sharecroppers. Tenant farming characterized the cotton and tobacco production in the post-Civil War South. As the agricultural economy plummeted in the early 1930s, all farmers in all parts of the nation were badly hurt. Worst hurt were the tenant farmers (who had relatively more control) and sharecroppers (who had less control), as well as daily laborers (mostly Black, with least control).

The problem was very low prices for farm products and the New Deal solution was to raise them by cutting production. It accomplished this in the South by the AAA, which gave landowners acreage reduction contracts, by which they were paid to not grow cotton or tobacco on a portion of their land. By law, they were required to pay the tenant farmers and sharecroppers on their land a portion of the money, but some cheated on this provision, hurting their tenants and croppers. The farm wage workers who worked directly for the landowner were mostly the ones who lost their jobs. For most tenants and sharecroppers the AAA was a major help. Researchers at the time concluded, "To the extent that the AAA control-program has been responsible for the increased price [of cotton], we conclude that it has increased the amount of goods and services consumed by the cotton tenants and croppers." Furthermore, the landowners typically let their tenants and croppers use the land taken out of production for their own personal use in growing food and feed crops, which further increased their standard of living. Another consequence was that the historic high levels of turnover from year to year declined sharply, as tenants and coppers tend to stay with the same landowner. Researchers concluded, "As a rule, planters seem to prefer Negroes to whites as tenants and coppers."

Once mechanization came to cotton (after 1945), the tenants and sharecroppers were largely surplus; they moved to towns and cities, going especially to centers of war industry in the North and West in the Second Great Migration.

=== Poverty in 1940 ===
Poverty was massive in 1940, according to Gunnar Myrdal in his famous study of An American Dilemma (1944):

Except for a small minority enjoying upper- or middle-class status, the masses of American Negroes, in the rural South and in the segregated slum quarters in Southern and Northern cities, have been destitute. . . . They own little property; even their household goods are usually inadequate and dilapidated. Their incomes are not only low, but irregular. Thus they live from day to day and have scant security for the future.

The main cause, argued Myrdal and his team, was that most Blacks were based in a backward poverty stricken part of the South:

Negroes are concentrated in the South, which is generally a poor and economically retarded region. A disproportionate number of them work in agriculture, which is a depressed occupation. Most rural Negroes are in Southern cotton agriculture, which is particularly overpopulated, backward in production methods, and hard hit by soil exhaustion, by the boll weevil, and by a long-time fall in international demand for American cotton. In addition, few Negro farmers own the land they work on, and the little land they do own is much poorer and less well equipped than average Southern farms. Most Negro farmers are concentrated in the lowest occupations in agriculture as sharecroppers or wage laborers.

=== World War II ===
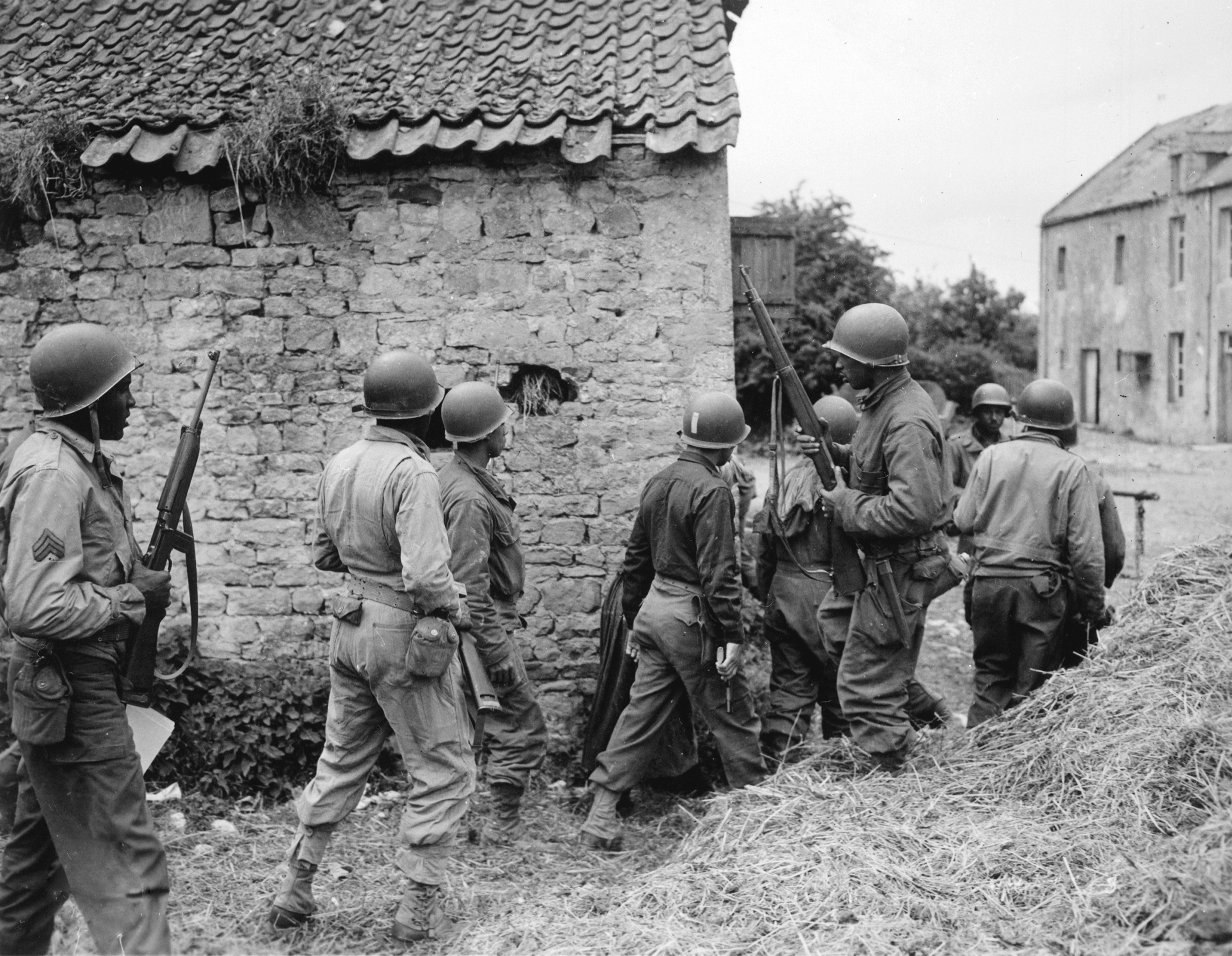
Black soldiers tracking a sniper Omaha Beachhead, near Vierville-sur-Mer, France. 10 June 1944

=== 1940–1941: Threat of March on Washington ===
When World War II broke out in Europe in September 1939, the U.S. was neutral but Roosevelt gave strong support to Great Britain in its war with Nazi Germany. He also began a rapid expansion of war industries, and decided to enlarge the U.S. Army by a new draft. African American leaders wanted to make sure Blacks would be drafted and be hired for war jobs on equal terms. When Congress passed the Selective Service Act in September 1940 establishing the draft, A. Philip Randolph, the president of all black Brotherhood of Sleeping Car Porters union had his union issue a resolution calling for the government to desegregate the military. As the First Lady Eleanor Roosevelt had attended the meeting of the brotherhood that passed the resolution, it was widely believed that the president was supportive. Randolph subsequently visited the White House on 27 September 1940, where President Roosevelt seemed to be equally sympathetic. Randolph felt very betrayed where he learned the military was to remain segregated after all despite the president's warm words. Roosevelt had begun a program of rearmament, and feeling the president was not to be trusted, Randolph formed the March on Washington Movement, announcing plans for a huge civil rights march in Washington DC that would demand desegregation of the military and the factories in the defense industry on 1 July 1941.

In June 1941 as the deadline for the march approached, Roosevelt asked for it to be cancelled, saying that 100,000 Black people demonstrating in Washington would create problems for him. On 18 June 1941, Randolph met with Roosevelt with the mayor of New York, Fiorello H. La Guardia serving as a mediator, where in a compromise it was agreed that the march would be cancelled in exchange for Executive Order 8802, which banned discrimination in factories making weapons for the military. In 1941, the Roosevelt administration, through officially neutral, was leaning in very Allied direction with the United States providing weapons to Great Britain and China (to be joined by the Soviet Union after 22 June 1941), and the president needed the co-operation of Congress as much possible, where isolationist voices were frequently heard. Roosevelt argued to Randolph that he could not antagonize the powerful bloc of conservative Southern Democrats in Congress, and desegregation of the military was out of the question as the Southern Democrats would never accept it; by contrast, as La Guardia pointed out, most of the factories in the defense industry were located in California, the Midwest and the Northeast.

=== A call for "The Double Victory" ===
The African-American newspaper The Pittsburgh Courier called for the "double victory" or "Double V campaign" in a 1942 editorial, saying that all Black people should work for "victory over our enemies at home and victory over our enemies on the battlefield abroad". The newspaper argued that a victory of the Axis powers, especially Nazi Germany, would be a disaster for African-Americans while at the same time the war presented the opportunity "to persuade, embarrass, compel and shame our government and our nation...into a more enlightened attitude towards a tenth of its people". The slogan of a "double victory" over fascism abroad and racism at home was widely taken up by African-Americans during the war.

=== Wartime service ===
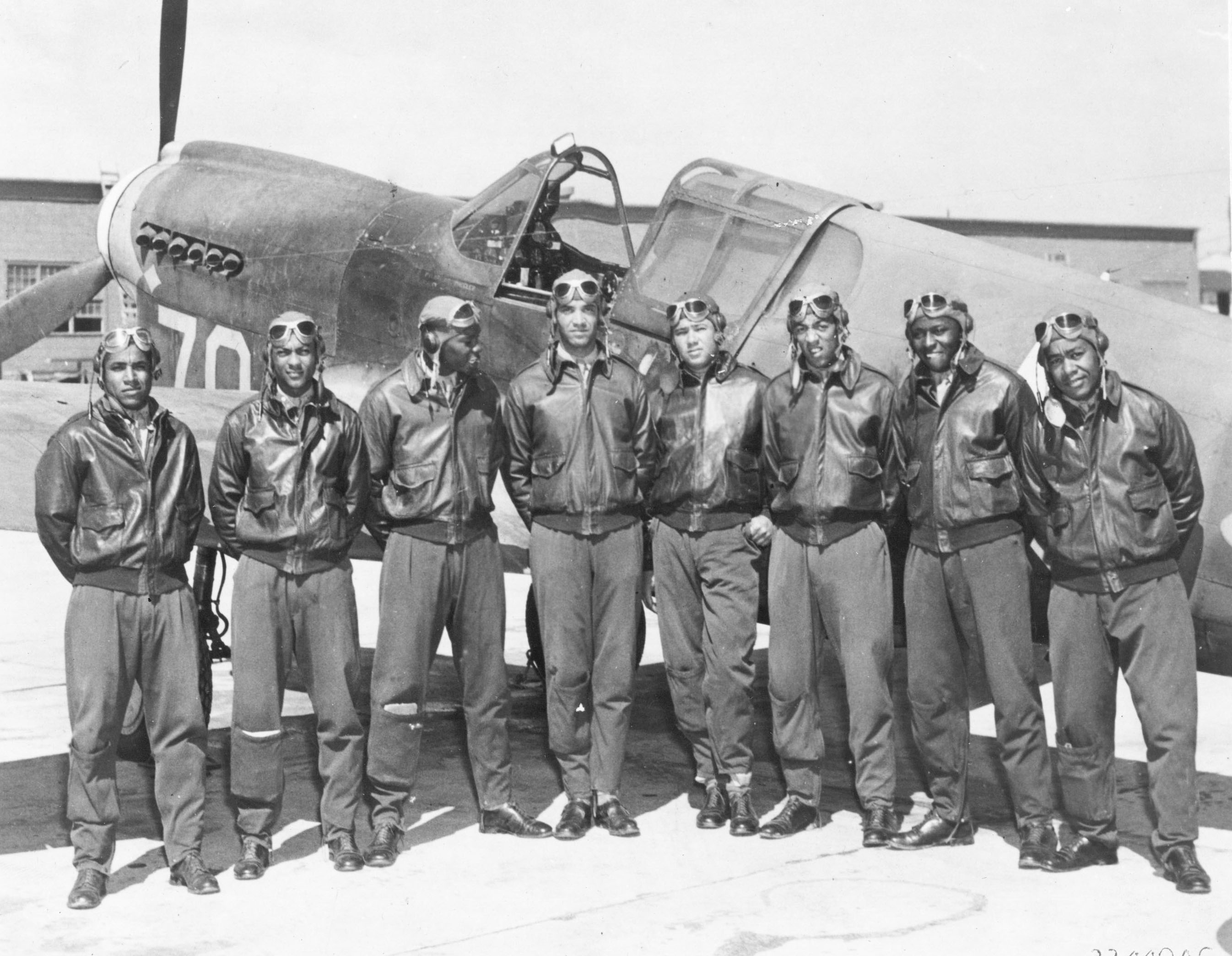
Eight Tuskegee Airmen in front of a P-40 fighter aircraft

Over 1.9 million Black people served in uniform during World War II. They served in segregated units. Black women served in the Army's WAAC and WAC, but very few served in the Navy.

The draft starkly exposed the poor living conditions of most African-Americans with the Selective Service Boards turning down 46% of the Black men called up on health grounds as compared to 30% of the white men called up. At least a third of the black men in the South called up by the draft boards turned out to be illiterate. Southern Black people fared badly on the Army General Classification Test (AGCT), an aptitude test designed to determine the most suitable role for those who were drafted, and which was not an IQ test. Of the Black men from the South drafted, 84% fell into the two lowest categories on the AGCT. Owing to the high failure rate caused by the almost non-existent education system for African-Americans in the South, the Army was forced to offer remedial instruction for Afro-Americans who fell into the lower categories of the AGCT. By 1945, about 150, 000 Black men had learned how to read and write while in the Army. The poor living conditions in rural America which afflicted both white and Black Americans led the Army to undertake remedial health work as well. Army optometrists fitted 2.25 million men suffering from poor eyesight with eyeglasses to allow them to be drafted while Army dentists fitted 2.5 million draftees who would have been otherwise disqualified for the bad state of their teeth with dentures.

Most of the Army's 231 training camps were located in the South, which was mostly rural and where land was cheaper. Black people from outside of the South that were sent to the training camps found life in the South almost unbearable. Tensions at army and navy training bases between Black and white trainees resulted in several outbreaks of racial violence with Black trainees sometimes being lynched. In the so-called Battle of Bamber Bridge on 24–25 June 1943 in the Lancashire town of Bamber Bridge saw a shoot-out between white and Black soldiers that left one dead. In an attempt to solve the problem of racial violence, the War Department in 1943 commissioned the director Frank Capra to make the propaganda film The Negro Soldier.

The segregated 92nd Division, which served in Italy, was noted for the antagonistic relations between its white officers and Black soldiers. In an attempt to ease the racial tensions, the 92nd Division was integrated in 1944 by having the all Japanese-American 442nd Regimental Combat Team together with one white regiment assigned to it. The segregated 93rd Division, which served in the Pacific, was assigned "mopping up" duties on the islands that the Americans mostly controlled. Black servicemen greatly resented segregation and those serving in Europe complained that German POWs were served better food than what they were.

The Navy was segregated and Black sailors were usually assigned menial work such as stevedores. At Port Chicago on 17 July 1944, while mostly Black stevedores were loading up two Navy supply ships, an explosion occurred that killed 320 men, of which 202 were Black. The explosion was widely blamed on the lack of training for Black stevedores, and 50 of the survivors of the explosion refused an order to return to work, demanding safety training first. At the subsequent court martial for the "Port Chicago 50" on the charges of mutiny, their defense lawyer, Thurgood Marshall stated: "Negroes in the Navy don't mind loading ammunition. They just want to know why they are the only ones doing the loading! They want to know why they are segregated; why they don't get promoted, and why the Navy disregarded official warnings by the San Francisco waterfront unions...that an explosion was inevitable if they persisted in using untrained seamen in the loading of ammunition". Though the sailors were convicted, the Port Chicago disaster led the Navy in August 1944 to allow Black sailors to serve alongside white sailors on ships, through Black people could only make up 10% of the crew.

Through the Army was reluctant to send Black units into combat, famous segregated units, such as the Tuskegee Airmen and the U.S. 761st Tank Battalion proved their value in combat. Approximately 75 percent of the soldiers who served in the European theater as truckers for the Red Ball Express and kept Allied supply lines open were African-American. During the crisis of the Battle of the Bulge in December 1944, the Army allowed several integrated infantry platoons to be formed, through these were broken up once the crisis passed. However, the experiment of the integrated platoons in December 1944 showed that integration did not mean the collapse of military discipline as many claimed that it would, and was a factor in the later desegregation of the armed forces. A total of 708 African Americans were killed in combat during World War II.

The distinguished service of these units was a factor in President Harry S. Truman's order to end discrimination in the Armed Forces in July 1948, with the promulgation of Executive Order 9981. This led in turn to the integration of the Air Force and the other services by the early 1950s. In his book A Rising Wind, Walter Francis White of the NAACP wrote: "World War II has immeasurably magnified the Negro's awareness of the American profession and practice of democracy...[Black veterans] will return home convinced that whatever betterment of their lot is achieved must come largely from their own efforts. They will return determined to use those efforts to the utmost".

=== Home front ===
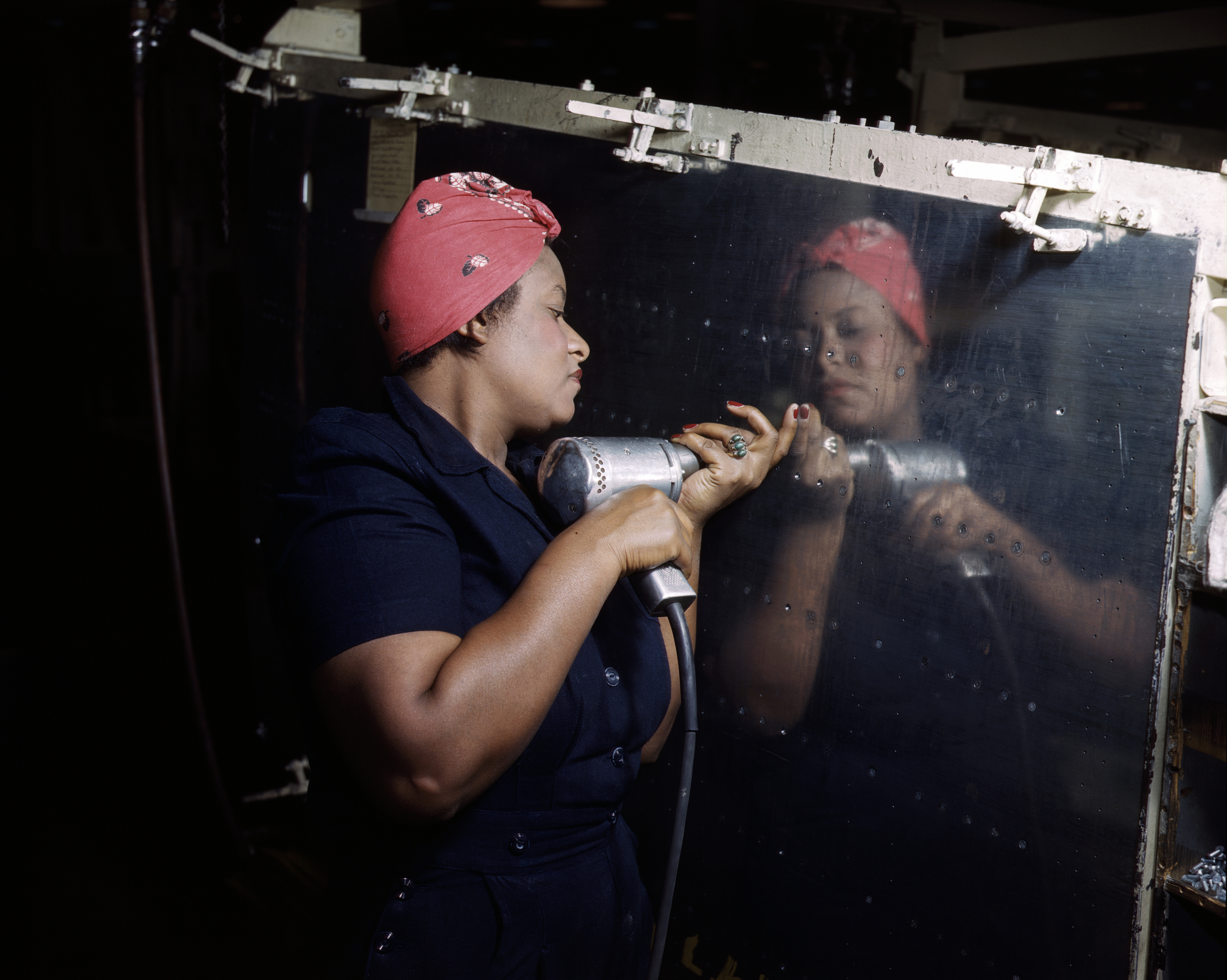
Rosie the Riveter

Due to massive shortages as a result of the American entry into World War II, defense employers from Northern and Western cities went to the South to convince blacks and whites there to leave the region in promise of higher wages and better opportunities. As a result, African Americans left the South in large numbers to munitions centers in the North and West to take advantage of the shortages caused by the war, sparking the Second Great Migration. While they somewhat lived in better conditions than the South (for instance, they could vote and send children to better schools), they nevertheless faced widespread discrimination due to bigotry and fear of competition of housing and jobs among white residents.

When Roosevelt learned that many companies in the defense industry were violating the spirit, if not the letter of Executive Order 8802 by only employing Black people in menial positions such as janitors and denying them the opportunity to work as highly paid skilled laborers, he significantly strengthened the Fair Employment Practice Committee (FEPC) with orders to fine the corporations that did not treat their Black employees equally. In 1943, Roosevelt gave the FEPC a budget of half-million dollars and replaced the unpaid volunteers who had previously staffed the FEPC with a paid staff concentrated in regional headquarters across the nation with instructions to inspect the defense industry's factories to ensure the spirit and letter of Executive Order 8802 was being obeyed. Roosevelt believed that having Black men and women employed in the defense industry working as skilled laborers would give them far higher wages than what they ever had before, and ultimately form the nucleus of a Black middle class. When the president learned that some unions were pushing for black employees to be given menial "auxiliary" jobs in the factories, he instructed the National Labor Relations Board to decertify those unions. In 1944, when the union for trolley drivers in Philadelphia went on strike to protest plans to hire African-Americans as trolley drivers, Roosevelt sent in troops to break the strike. In 1942, Black people made up 3% of the workforce in the defense industry; by 1945 Black people made up 8% of the workforce in defense industry factories (Black people made up 10% of the population).

Racial tensions were also high between whites and ethnic minorities that cities like Chicago, Detroit, Los Angeles, and Harlem experienced race riots in 1943. In May 1943, in Mobile, Alabama, when the local shipyard promoted some Black men up to be trained as welders, white workers rioted and seriously injured 11 of their Black co-workers. In Los Angeles, the Zoot Suit riots of 3–8 June 1943 saw white servicemen attacking Chicano (Mexican-American) and Black youths for wearing zoot suits. On 15 June 1943, in Beaumont, Texas, a pogrom saw a white mob smash up Black homes while lynching 2 Black men. In Detroit, which expanded massively during the war years with 50, 000 Black people from the South and 200, 000 "hillbilly" whites from Appalachia moving to the city to work in the factories, competition for sparse rental housing had pushed tensions to the brink. On 20 June 1943, false rumors that a white mob had lynched 3 Black men led to an outbreak of racial rioting in Detroit that left 34 dead, of whom 25 were Black. On 1–2 August 1943, another race riot in Harlem left 6 Black people dead.

Politically, Black people left the Republican Party and joined the Democratic New Deal Coalition of President Franklin D. Roosevelt, whom they widely admired. The political leaders, ministers and newspaper editors who shaped opinion resolved on a Double V campaign: Victory over German and Japanese fascism abroad, and victory over discrimination at home. Black newspapers created the Double V campaign to build Black morale and head off radical action. During the war years, the NAACP expanded tenfold, having over half a million members by 1945. The new civil rights group Committee of Racial Equality (CORE), founded in 1942, started demonstrations demanding desegregation of buses, theaters and restaurants. At one CORE demonstration outside a segregated restaurant in Washington, DC in 1944 had signs reading "We Die Together', Let's Eat Together" and "Are you for Hitler's Way or the American Way?". In 1944, the Swedish economist Gunnar Myrdal published his bestselling book An American Dilemma: The Negro Problem and Modern Democracy where he described in much detail the effects of white supremacy upon Black Americans, and predicated in the long run the Jim Crow regime was unsustainable, as he argued that after the war African-Americans would be not willing to accept a permanent second class status.

Most Black women had been farm laborers or domestics before the war. Despite discrimination and segregated facilities throughout the South, they escaped the cotton patch and took blue-collar jobs in the cities. Working with the federal Fair Employment Practices Committee, the NAACP and CIO unions, these Black women fought a Double V campaign against the Axis abroad and against restrictive hiring practices at home. Their efforts redefined citizenship, equating their patriotism with war work, and seeking equal employment opportunities, government entitlements, and better working conditions as conditions appropriate for full citizens. In the South, Black women worked in segregated jobs; in the West and most of the North they were integrated, but wildcat strikes erupted in Detroit, Baltimore, and Evansville where white migrants from the South refused to work alongside Black women. The most largest of the "hate strikes" was the strike by white women at the Western Electric factory in Baltimore, who objected to sharing a bathroom with Black women.

=== Hollywood ===
"Stormy Weather" (1943) (starring Lena Horne, Bill "Bojangles" Robinson, and Cab Calloway's Band), along with Cabin in the Sky (1943) (starring Ethel Waters, Eddie "Rochester" Anderson, Lena Horne, and Louis "Satchmo" Armstrong), and other musicals of the 1940s opened new roles for Black people in Hollywood. They broke through old stereotypes and far surpassed the limited, poorly paid roles available in race films produced for all-Black audiences.

== Second Great Migration ==
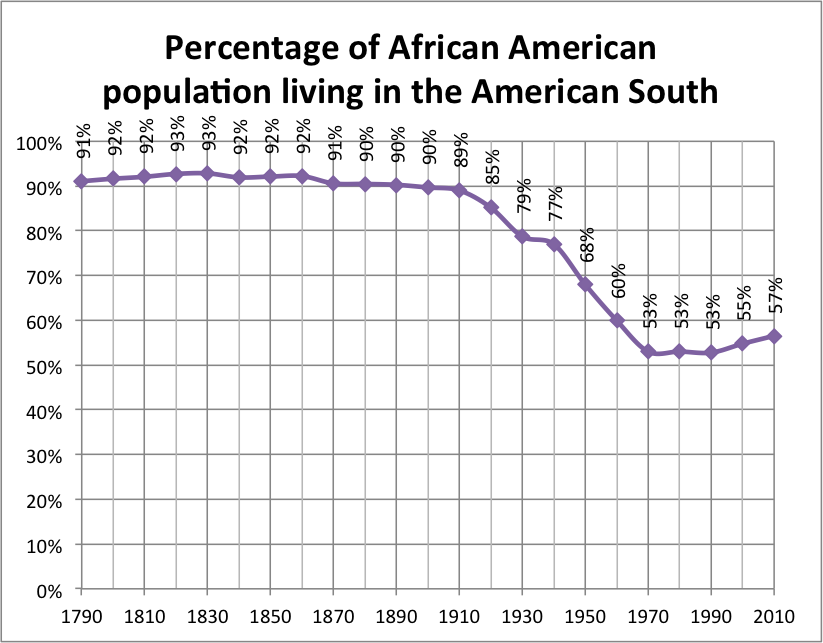
Graph showing the percentage of the African American population living in the American South, 1790–2010

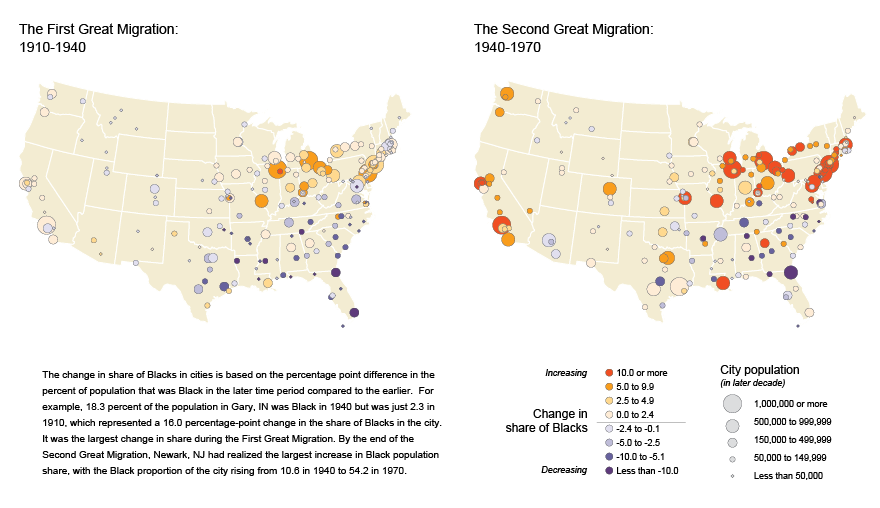
First and Second Great Migrations shown through changes in African American share of population in major U.S. cities, 1916–1930 and 1940–1970

The Second Great Migration was the migration of more than 5 million African Americans from the South to the other three regions of the United States. It took place from 1941 through World War II, and it lasted until 1970. It was much larger and of a different character than the first Great Migration (1910–1940). Some historians prefer to distinguish between the movements for those reasons.

In the Second Great Migration, more than five million African Americans moved to cities in states in the Northeast, Midwest, and West, including the West Coast, where many skilled jobs in the defense industry were concentrated. More of these migrants were already urban laborers who came from the cities of the South. They were better educated and they had better skills than the people who did not migrate.

Compared to the more rural migrants of the period 1910–40, many African Americans in the South were already living in urban areas and had urban job skills before they relocated. They moved to take jobs in the burgeoning industrial cities and especially the many jobs in the defense industry during World War II. Workers who were limited to segregated, low-skilled jobs in Southern cities were able to get highly skilled, well-paid jobs at West Coast shipyards. The effect of racially homogeneous communities composed largely of Black immigrants that formed because of spatial segregation in destination cities was that they were largely influenced by the Southern culture they brought with them. The food, music and even the discriminatory white police presence in these neighborhoods were all imported to a certain extent from the collective experiences of the highly concentrated African-American migrants. Writers have often assumed that Southern migrants contributed disproportionately to changes in the African-American family in the inner city. However, census data for 1940 through 1990 show that these families actually exhibited more traditional family patterns—more children living with two parents, more ever-married women living with their spouses, and fewer never-married mothers.

By the end of the Second Great Migration, African Americans had become an urbanized population. More than 80 percent of them lived in cities. Fifty-three percent of them remained in the Southern United States, 40 percent of them lived in the Northeast and North Central states and 7 percent of them lived in the West.

== Civil rights era ==
=== Early civil rights movement ===
In response to these and other setbacks, in the summer of 1905, W. E. B. Du Bois and 28 other prominent, African-American men met secretly at Niagara Falls, Ontario. There, they produced a manifesto in which they called for an end to racial discrimination, full civil liberties for African Americans and recognition of human brotherhood. The organization which they established came to be called the Niagara Movement. After the notorious Springfield, Illinois race riot of 1908, a group of concerned Whites joined the leadership of the Niagara Movement and formed the National Association for the Advancement of Colored People (NAACP) a year later, in 1909. Under the leadership of Du Bois, the NAACP mounted legal challenges to segregation and it also lobbied legislatures on behalf of Black Americans.

While the NAACP used the court system to promote equality, at the local level, African Americans adopted a self-help strategy. They pooled their resources to create independent community and institutional lives for themselves. They established schools, churches, social welfare institutions, banks, African-American newspapers and small businesses which could serve their communities. The main organizer of national and local self-help organizations was Alabama educator Booker T. Washington.

Some Progressive Era reformers were concerned about the Black condition. In 1908 after the 1906 Atlanta Race Riot got him involved, Ray Stannard Baker published the book Following the Color Line: An Account of Negro Citizenship in the American Democracy, becoming the first prominent journalist to examine America's racial divide; it was extremely successful. Sociologist Rupert Vance says it is:

the best account of race relations in the South during the period—one that reads like field notes for the future historian. This account was written during the zenith of Washingtonian movement and shows the optimism that it inspired among both liberals and moderates. The book is also notable for its realistic accounts of Negro town life.

The Supreme Court handed down a landmark decision in the case of Brown v. Board of Education (1954) of Topeka. This decision applied to public facilities, especially public schools. Reforms occurred slowly and only after concerted activism by African Americans. The ruling also brought new momentum to the Civil Rights Movement. Boycotts against segregated public transportation systems sprang up in the South, the most notable of which was the Montgomery bus boycott.

Civil rights groups such as the Southern Christian Leadership Conference (SCLC) organized across the South with tactics such as boycotts, voter registration campaigns, Freedom Rides and other nonviolent direct action, such as marches, pickets and sit-ins to mobilize around issues of equal access and voting rights. Southern segregationists fought back to block reform. The conflict grew to involve steadily escalating physical violence, bombings and intimidation by Southern whites. Law enforcement responded to protesters with batons, electric cattle prods, fire hoses, attack dogs and mass arrests.

In Virginia, state legislators, school board members and other public officials mounted a campaign of obstructionism and outright defiance to integration called Massive Resistance. It entailed a series of actions to deny state funding to integrated schools and instead fund privately run "segregation academies" for white students. Farmville, Virginia, in Prince Edward County, was one of the plaintiff African-American communities involved in the 1954 Brown v. Board of Education Supreme Court decision. As a last-ditch effort to avoid court-ordered desegregation, officials in the county shut down the county's entire public school system in 1959 and it remained closed for five years. White students were able to attend private schools established by the community for the sole purpose of circumventing integration. The largely Black rural population of the county had little recourse. Some families were split up as parents sent their children to live with relatives in other locales to attend public school; but the majority of Prince Edward's more than 2,000 black children, as well as many poor whites, simply remained unschooled until federal court action forced the schools to reopen five years later.

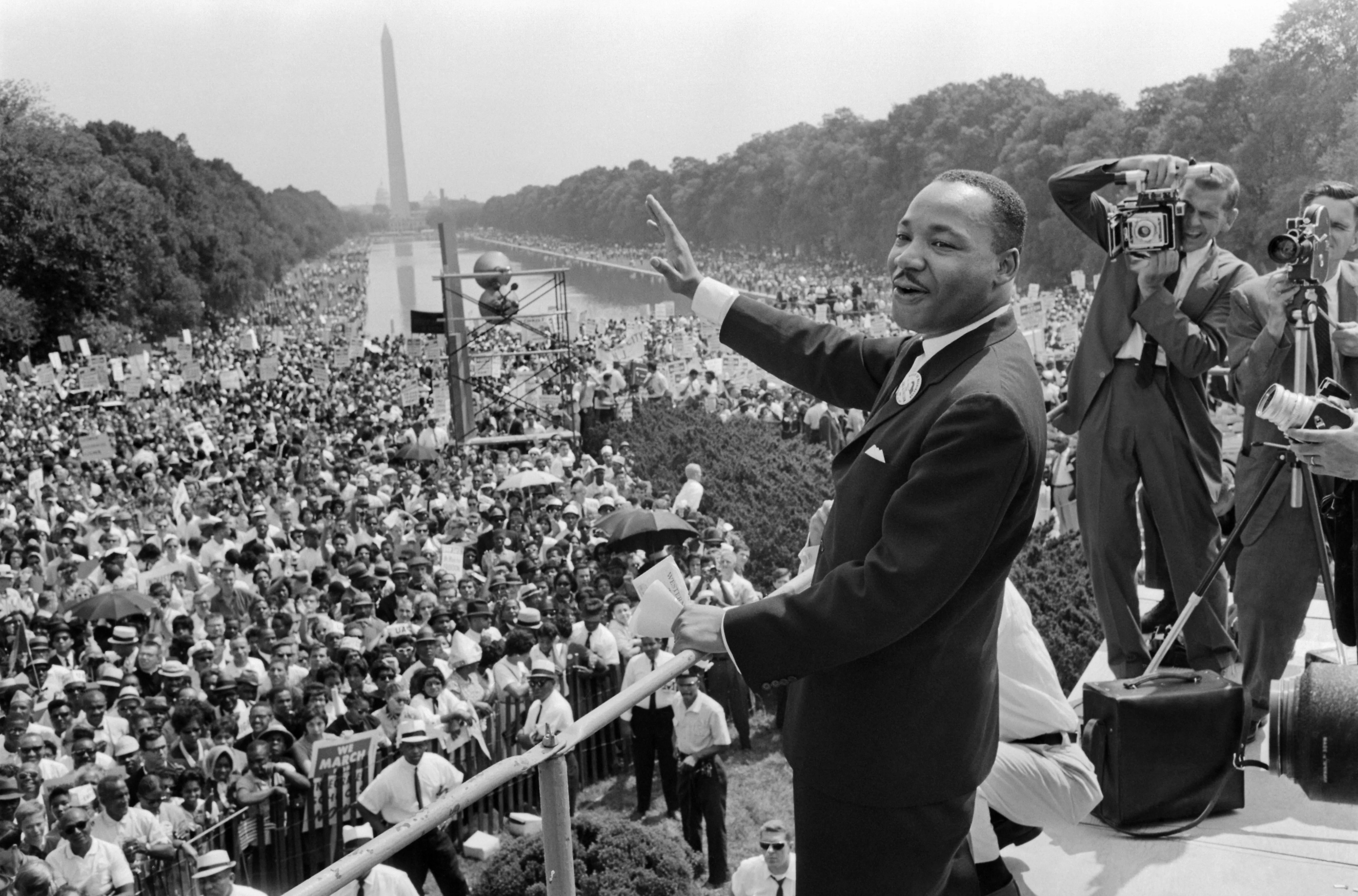
Martin Luther King Jr. shortly after delivering his famous "I Have a Dream" speech during the March on Washington

Perhaps the high point of the Civil Rights Movement was the 1963 March on Washington for Jobs and Freedom, which brought more than 250,000 marchers to the grounds of the Lincoln Memorial and the National Mall in Washington, D.C., to speak out for an end to southern racial violence and police brutality, equal opportunity in employment, equal access in education and public accommodations. The organizers of the march were called the "Big Six" of the Civil Rights Movement: Bayard Rustin the strategist who has been called the "invisible man" of the Civil Rights Movement; labor organizer and initiator of the march, A. Philip Randolph; Roy Wilkins of the NAACP; Whitney Young Jr., of the National Urban League; Martin Luther King Jr., of the Southern Christian Leadership Conference (SCLC); James Farmer of the Congress on Racial Equality (CORE); and John Lewis of the Student Nonviolent Coordinating Committee (SNCC). Also active behind the scenes and sharing the podium with King was Dorothy Height, head of the National Council of Negro Women. It was at this event, on the steps of the Lincoln Memorial, that King delivered his historic "I Have a Dream" speech.

This march, the 1963 Birmingham Children's Crusade, and other events were credited with putting pressure on President John F. Kennedy, and then Lyndon B. Johnson, that culminated in the passage the Civil Rights Act of 1964 that banned discrimination in public accommodations, employment, and labor unions.

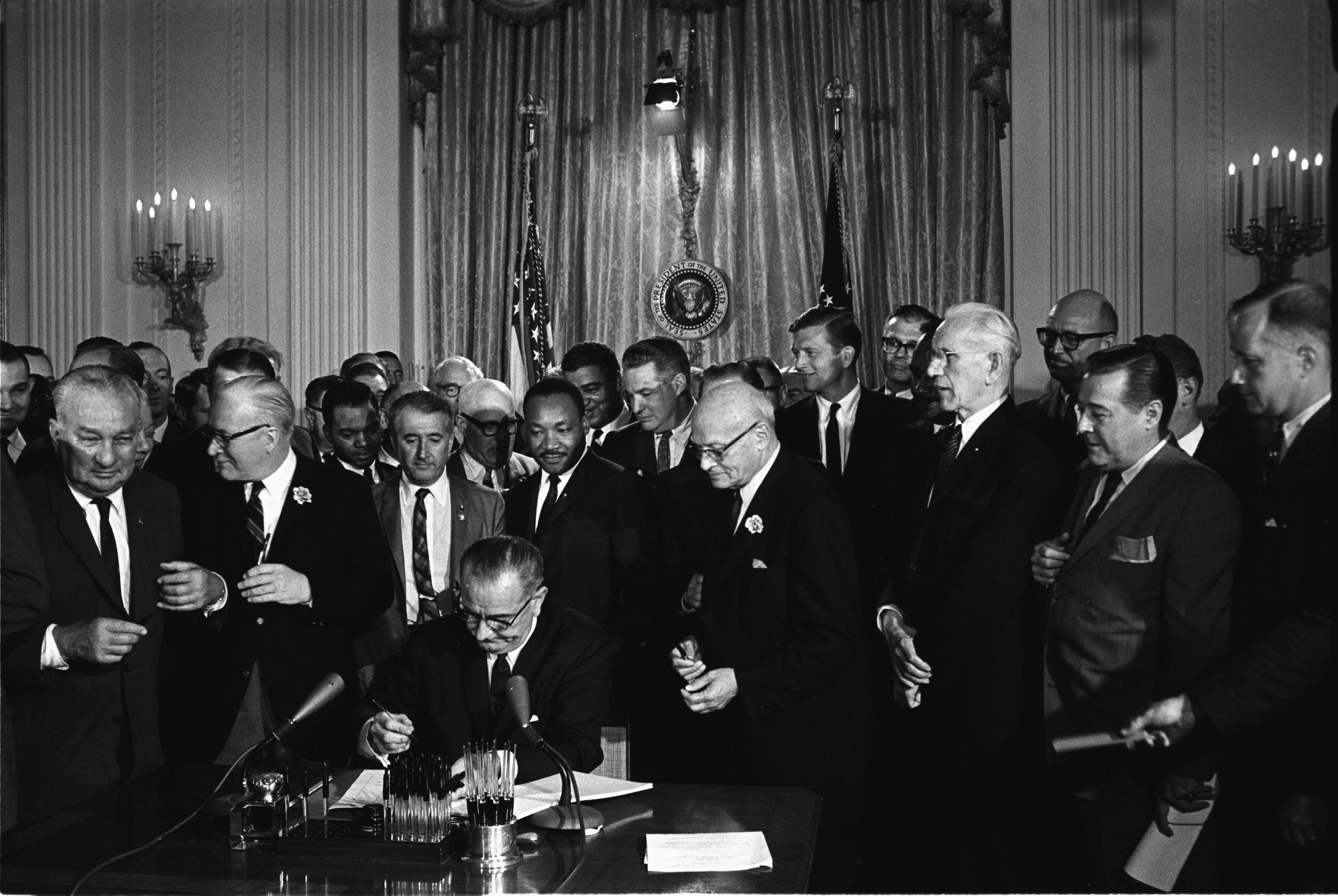
President Johnson signs the historic Civil Rights Act of 1964.

The "Mississippi Freedom Summer" of 1964 brought thousands of idealistic youth, black and white, to the state to run "freedom schools", to teach basic literacy, history and civics. Other volunteers were involved in voter registration drives. The season was marked by harassment, intimidation and violence directed at civil rights workers and their host families. The disappearance of three youths, James Chaney, Andrew Goodman and Michael Schwerner in Philadelphia, Mississippi, captured the attention of the nation. Six weeks later, searchers found the savagely beaten body of Chaney, a Black man, in a muddy dam alongside the remains of his two white companions, who had been shot to death. There was national outrage at the escalating injustices of the "Mississippi Blood Summer", as it by then had come to be known, and at the brutality of the murders.

In 1965, the Selma Voting Rights Movement, its Selma to Montgomery marches, and the tragic murders of two activists associated with the march, inspired President Lyndon B. Johnson to call for the full Voting Rights Act of 1965, which struck down barriers to black enfranchisement. In 1966 the Chicago Open Housing Movement, followed by the passage of the 1968 Fair Housing Act, was a capstone to more than a decade of major legislation during the civil rights movement.

By this time, African Americans who questioned the effectiveness of nonviolent protest had gained a greater voice. More militant Black leaders, such as Malcolm X of the Nation of Islam and Eldridge Cleaver of the Black Panther Party, called for Black people to defend themselves, using violence, if necessary. From the mid-1960s to the mid-1970s, the Black Power movement urged African Americans to look to Africa for inspiration and emphasized Black solidarity, rather than integration.

During the civil rights era saw a surge of Ku Klux Klan activities such as bombings of African American schools and churches and violence against African American and white activists in the South.

== Post-civil rights era ==
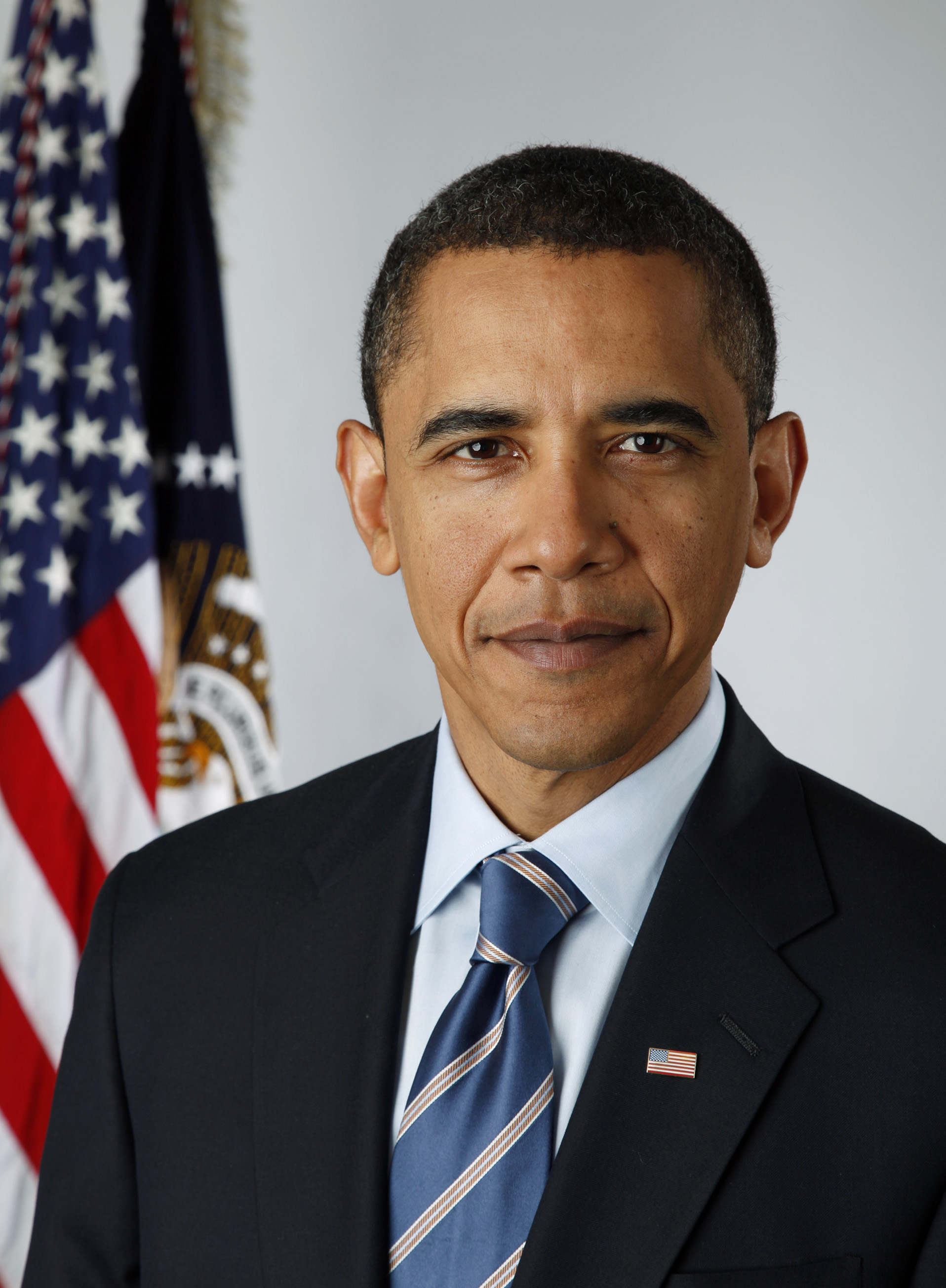
The first African American President of the United States, Barack Obama

A large scale post-civil rights era demonstration was held on October 16, 1995, in Washington, D.C., called the Million Man March. Organized by Nation of Islam leader Louis Farrakhan, the event aimed to promote African American unity. The march featured speeches from prominent civil rights leaders, including Benjamin Chavis, James Bevel, Jesse Jackson, and Maya Angelou, with several hundred thousand to over one million participants.

The appointment of Black people to high federal offices—including General Colin Powell, Chairman of the U.S. Armed Forces Joint Chiefs of Staff, 1989–1993, United States Secretary of State, 2001–2005; Condoleezza Rice, Assistant to the President for National Security Affairs, 2001–2004, Secretary of State in, 2005–2009; Ron Brown, United States Secretary of Commerce, 1993–1996; and Supreme Court justices Thurgood Marshall and Clarence Thomas—also demonstrates the increasing visibility of Black people in the political arena.

Economic progress for Black people reaching the extremes of wealth has been slow. According to Forbes richest lists, Oprah Winfrey was the richest African American of the 20th century and has been the world's only Black billionaire in 2004, 2005, and 2006. Not only was Winfrey the world's only Black billionaire but she has been the only Black person on the Forbes 400 list nearly every year since 1995. BET founder Bob Johnson briefly joined her on the list from 2001 to 2003 before his ex-wife acquired part of his fortune; although he returned to the list in 2006, he did not make it in 2007. With Winfrey the only African American wealthy enough to rank among America's 400 richest people, African Americans currently comprise 0.25% of America's economic elite and comprise 13.6% of the U.S. population. Despite these gains, substantial economic inequality remains; the typical White household owns nine times as much wealth as the typical Black household.

The dramatic political breakthrough came in the 2008 election, with the election of Barack Obama, the son of a Black Kenyan father and a white American mother. He won overwhelming support from African-American voters in the Democratic primaries, even as his main opponent Hillary Clinton had the support of many Black politicians. African Americans continued to support Obama throughout his term. After completing his first term, Obama ran for a second term. In 2012, he won the presidential election against candidate Mitt Romney and was re-elected as the president of the United States.

The post-civil rights era is also notable for the New Great Migration, in which millions of African Americans have returned to the South including Texas, Georgia, Florida, Maryland and North Carolina, often to pursue increased economic opportunities in now-desegregated southern cities. Fort Worth, Columbus, Jacksonville and Charlotte had the largest increase in the black population.

White gunman Dylann Roof shot and killed 9 African American churchgoers in Charleston, South Carolina 2015. Micah Xavier Johnson, a Black nationalist, carried out the 2016 shooting of Dallas police officers during a Black Lives Matter protest, killing five officers and injuring 9 others, over frustration with police killings of Black men. Beyoncé performed her song "Formation" at Super Bowl in clothing inspired by the Black Panthers on February 7, 2016.

In 2020, many African Americans protested for George Floyd during the George Floyd protests. George Floyd, an unarmed African American man, was murdered by white police officer Derek Chauvin in Minneapolis on May 25, 2020. Floyd was suspected of using a fake $20 bill. Payton S. Gendron, a White supremacist, carried out the 2022 Buffalo shooting killing ten people, all of whom were Black

On August 11, 2020, Senator Kamala Harris (D-CA) was announced as the first African American woman to run for vice-president on a major party presidential ticket. She was elected vice president in the 2020 United States presidential election. On August 5, 2024, Harris became the second woman and first African American woman to be a major party's presidential nominee following a virtual roll call from the DNC, in the aftermath of president Joe Biden suspended his campaign. She would lose the election to Donald Trump.

In 2026, Benin offered Beninese citizenship to African Americans.

=== Social issues ===
After the civil rights movement gains of the 1950s–1970s, due to government neglect, unfavorable social policies, high poverty rates, changes implemented in the criminal justice system and laws, and a breakdown in traditional family units, African-American communities have been suffering from extremely high incarceration rates. African Americans have the highest imprisonment rate of any major ethnic group in the world. The Southern states, which historically had been involved in slavery and post-Reconstruction oppression, now produce the highest rates of incarceration and death penalty application.

== Religion ==
By 1800, a small number of slaves had joined Christian churches. Free Black people in the North set up their own networks of churches and in the South the slaves sat in the upper galleries of white churches. Central to the growth of community among Blacks was the Black church, usually the first communal institution to be established. The Black church was both an expression of community and unique African-American spirituality, and a reaction to discrimination. The churches also served as neighborhood centers where free Black people could celebrate their African heritage without intrusion from white detractors. The church also served as the center of education. Since the church was part of the community and wanted to provide education; it educated the freed and enslaved Black people. Seeking autonomy, some Black people like Richard Allen founded separate Black denominations.

The Second Great Awakening (1800–1830s) has been called the "central and defining event in the development of Afro-Christianity."

== Historiography ==
The history of slavery in the United States has always been a major research topic among white scholars, but until the 1950s, they generally focused on the political and constitutional themes of slavery debated by white politicians and the operation of slavery from the viewpoint of the large plantation owners; they did not deeply study the lives of the enslaved black people. During Reconstruction and the late 19th century, Black people became major actors in the South. The Dunning School of white scholars generally cast Black people as pawns of white Carpetbaggers during this period, but W. E. B. Du Bois, a Black historian, and Ulrich B. Phillips, a white historian, studied the African-American experience in depth. Du Bois' study of Reconstruction provided a more objective context for evaluating its achievements and weaknesses; Additionally, he conducted studies of contemporary Black life. Phillips set the main topics of inquiry that still guide the analysis of slave economics.

During the first half of the 20th century, Carter G. Woodson was the major Black scholar who studied and promoted the Black historical experience. Woodson insisted that the scholarly study of the African-American experience should be sound, creative, restorative, and, most important, it should be directly relevant to the Black community. He popularized Black history with a variety of innovative strategies, including the founding of the Association for the Study of Negro Life, the development of outreach activities, the creation of Negro History Week (now Black History Month, in February), and the publication of a popular Black history magazine. Woodson democratized, legitimized, and popularized Black history.

Benjamin Quarles (1904–1996) had a significant impact on the teaching of African-American history. Quarles and John Hope Franklin provided a bridge between the work of historians in historically Black colleges, such as Woodson, and the Black history that is now well established in mainline universities. Quarles grew up in Boston, attended Shaw University as an undergraduate, and received a graduate degree at the University of Wisconsin. In 1953, he began teaching at Morgan State College in Baltimore, where he stayed, despite the fact that he received a lucrative offer from Johns Hopkins University. Quarles' books included The Negro in the Civil War (1953), The Negro in the American Revolution (1961), Lincoln and the Negro (1962), The Negro in the Making of America (1964, updated 1987), and Black Abolitionists (1969), which are all narrative accounts of critical wartime episodes that focused on how Black people interacted with their white allies.

Black historians attempted to reverse centuries of ignorance. While they were not alone in advocating a new examination of slavery and racism in the United States, the study of African-American history has frequently been a political and scholarly struggle which has been waged by historians who wish to refute incorrect assumptions. One of the foremost assumptions was the belief that enslaved people did not rebel because they were passive. A series of historians transformed the image of African Americans, revealing that they had a much richer and a more complex experience. Historians such as Leon F. Litwack documented how former enslaved people fought to keep their families together and he also documented that they struggled against tremendous odds in order to define themselves as free people. Other historians wrote about rebellions, both small and large.

In the 21st century, Black history is considered mainstream. Since it was recognized by President Gerald Ford in 1976, "Black History Month" is celebrated in the United States every year during the month of February. Proponents of Black history believe that it promotes diversity, develops self-esteem, and corrects myths and stereotypes. Opponents of it argue that such curricula are dishonest, divisive, and lack academic credibility and rigor.

In 2021, College Board announced that it will pilot an AP African American Studies course between 2022 and 2024. The course is expected to be launched in 2024. The goal of the course is to expand student understanding of black history, culture, art, literature, and academics.

=== Knowledge of Black history ===
Surveys of 11th- and 12th-grade students and adults in 2005 show that American schools have given students an awareness of some famous figures in Black history. Both groups were asked to name 10 famous Americans, excluding presidents. Of those named, the three most mentioned were Black: 67% named Martin Luther King Jr., 60% Rosa Parks, and 44% Harriet Tubman. Among adults, King was second (at 36%) and Parks was tied for fourth with 30%, while Tubman tied for 10th place with Henry Ford, at 16%. When distinguished historians were asked in 2006 to name the most prominent Americans, Parks and Tubman did not make the top 100.

=== Scholars of African-American history ===
- Herbert Aptheker
- Lerone Bennett Jr.
- Ira Berlin
- John Wesley Blassingame
- John Henrik Clarke
- W. E. B. Du Bois
- Lonnie Bunch
- Eric Foner
- John Hope Franklin
- Henry Louis Gates Jr.
- Eugene Genovese
- Annette Gordon-Reed
- Lorenzo Greene
- Herbert Gutman
- Steven Hahn
- Vincent Harding
- Asa Grant Hilliard III
- Nikole Hannah-Jones
- William Loren Katz
- Peter Kolchin
- Barbara Krauthamer
- Brent Leggs
- David Levering Lewis
- Leon F. Litwack
- Rayford Logan
- Manning Marable
- Gwendolyn Midlo Hall
- Zora Neale Hurston
- Nell Irvin Painter
- Benjamin Quarles
- Cedric Robinson
- Joel Augustus Rogers
- Mark S. Weiner
- Charles H. Wesley
- Isabel Wilkerson
- Carter G. Woodson

== See also ==
- American Descendants of Slavery – American political movement
- Timeline of African-American history
- Destination Freedom – 1948–1949 radio dramas that retell African-American history, many written by Richard Durham
- Race and ethnicity in the United States
  - Historical racial and ethnic demographics of the United States
- African diaspora
- List of plantations in the United States
- List of slave owners
- List of presidents of the United States who owned slaves
- List of slave traders of the United States
- List of members of the United States Congress who owned slaves
- African-American culture
- Culture of the United States
- Society of the United States
- African American Lives – 2006–2008 PBS television miniseries
- Association for the Study of African American Life and History – Learned society

=== Discrimination and harm ===
- History of poverty in U.S.
- List of expulsions of African Americans
- Lynching in the United States
- Mass racial violence in the United States
- Racial segregation
  - Racial segregation of churches
- Racism against African Americans
  - Black genocide – the notion that African Americans have been subjected to genocide
- Slavery

==== White racism ====
- White guilt
- White flight
- White nationalism
- White supremacy

=== Heritage commemoration ===
- Black History Month
- List of monuments to African Americans
- African-American Heritage Sites
- African-American Historic Places

=== Museums and memorabilia ===
- List of museums focused on African Americans
- National Museum of African American History and Culture
- Legacy Museum of African American History
- Texas African American History Memorial
- African American Military History Museum
- International African American Museum
- Jim Crow Museum of Racist Memorabilia

=== By period ===
- African American founding fathers of the United States
- Veterans lynched after World War I
- Impact of the COVID-19 pandemic

=== By topic ===
- Agriculture
- Culture
- Education
- Military
  - Vietnam War
- Religion
  - Black church
- Sports

=== Other groups ===
- Mexican Americans
- Native Americans in the United States
- Hispanic and Latino Americans
- Japanese Americans
- Chinese Americans
- Filipino Americans
- Jews

=== Civil rights movement ===
- Civil rights movement
  - (1865–1896)
  - (1896–1954)
- In popular culture
- History in the United States
- Timeline
- 19th-century African-American civil rights activists
- List of leaders
- List of photographers
- Plantation house
- Post–civil rights era in African-American history

=== Regional histories ===
History of slavery in:

- Alabama
- Florida
- Georgia (U.S. state)
- Kentucky
- Maryland
- New York (state)
- Virginia
- Texas
- West Virginia
- Missouri
- Louisiana
- North Carolina
- South Carolina
- Tennessee
- Delaware

==== Southern United States ====
- Black Belt in the American South
- Plantation complexes in the Southern United States
- Culture of the Southern United States
- History of the Southern United States
- Politics of the Southern United States

By state:

- Alabama
  - Black Belt (region of Alabama)
- Arkansas
- Florida
- Georgia
- History in Kansas
- History in Kentucky
  - List of Kentucky women in the civil rights era
- Louisiana
- Maryland
- Mississippi
- History in Nebraska
- New Jersey
- New York
- North Carolina
- Oklahoma
- History in Oregon
- South Carolina
  - South Carolina in the civil rights movement
- Tennessee
- Texas
- Utah
- Virginia
  - First Africans in Virginia

By city:

- Atlanta
- New York City
- Omaha, Nebraska
  - Civil rights movement in Omaha, Nebraska
- Black Belt (region of Chicago)
- History in Boston
- History in Chicago
- History in Dallas-Ft. Worth
- History in Detroit
- History in Houston
- History in Philadelphia
- History in San Antonio
- Davenport, Iowa
- History in Austin
- History in Jacksonville, Florida
- Washington, D.C.
- History in Baltimore

By other American region:

- Black history in Puerto Rico

Internationally:

- Ghana
- Israel
- France
