= 1943 Spring Operation in the Taihang Mountains =

Battle of the Second Sino-Japanese War

- Part of the Second Sino-Japanese War
Date	April 20 – May 22, 1943 (1 month and 2 days)
Location	Taihang Mountains, China
Result	Japanese victory

Belligerents
(Republic of China (1912–1949)) National Revolutionary Army, China	(Empire of Japan) Japanese North China Area Army, Imperial Japanese Army, Japan

Commanders and leaders
(Republic of China (1912–1949)) Pang Bingxun (surrendered) (Republic of China (1912–1949)) Sun Dianying (surrendered) (Republic of China (1912–1949)) Ma Fawu (WIA) (Republic of China (1912–1949)) Liu Jin (Republic of China (1912–1949)) Peng Dehuai (Republic of China (1912–1949)) Liu Bocheng	(Empire of Japan) Teiichi Yoshimoto

Units involved
Nationalists : 24th Group Army : 40th Army; New 5th Army; 27th Army; Various guerilla units; Various local militias; Communists : Eighth Route Army	First Army : 36th Division; 37th Division; 69th Division; 3rd Independent Mixed Brigade; 4th Independent Mixed Brigade; Twelfth Army : 35th Division

Strength
24th Group Army : 82,000 (Japanese Claim) Eighth Route Army : 14,679 militiamen	50,000 (Nationalist Chinese Claim)

Casualties and losses
Japanese Claim : (Note: The majority of these were from the 24th Group Army and only a small number were from the Communist Army); 9,913 killed 15,900 POWs; 58,000 surrendered Chinese Claim : Nationalists : 24th Group Army : 5,000-6,000 casualties New 5th Army wiped out; Various guerilla units and local militias surrendered and defected; Communists : Eighth Route Army : 142 killed, 237 wounded	Japanese Claim : 227 killed 803 wounded Chinese Nationalist Claim : 5,000-6,000 casualties Chinese Communist Claim : 2,500+ casualties

The 1943 Spring Operation in the Taihang Mountains was an operation initiated by the Japanese North China Area Army to destroy, capture, or force the surrender of Chinese guerillas based in the Taihang Mountains, one of the most renowned mountain ranges in China spanning across Hebei, Henan, and Shanxi provinces. The first phase of the operation was aimed at the Nationalist 24th Group Army in the southern part of the Taihang Mountains and the second phase targeted the base of the Taihang Military Region of the Communist Eighth Route Army. The National Revolutionary Army referred to the battle as the Second Battle of the Taihang Mountains District. (Note: Lasting from the first phase of the Japanese operation on April 20, 1943 until the last of the 27th Army abandoned the Taihang Mountains and crossed the Yellow River south on September 8, 1943.) The Eighth Route Army referred to the second phase of the operation as the May 1943 Taihang Anti-"Mopping-Up" Campaign and the Summer Anti-"Mopping-Up" Campaign. (Note: Not relating to the '1943 Summer Operation in the Taihang Mountains', a Japanese Army term for its operation against the Nationalist 27th Army in July 1943.)

== Background ==
=== Japanese view ===
The 24th Group Army entrenched in the southern part of the Taihang Mountains had suffered repeated punitive expeditions and economic blockades and its combat strength had significantly declined. However, the Nationalist government had bolstered its troops to 82,000 by early 1943. Its defensive positions were strengthened and its disruptive activities in pacified areas became more active. At the same time, in the areas bordering the north, there were constant conflicts between the Nationalists and the Communists. Communist troops of the Taihang Military Region were regarded as the most elite troops of the Shanxi–Hebei–Shandong–Henan Border Region. The headquarters of the Eighth Route Army under deputy commander-in-chief Peng Dehuai was also located there. Despite repeated mopping-up and annihilation campaigns by the Japanese Army, the Communist Army had preserved its combat strength through clever withdrawal tactics. They continued conducting various political operations, attacks on small outposts, and destruction of communication and transportation lines. Moreover, since June 1942, they took advantage of the weakening of the Nationalist 40th Army to advance southward and expand their base.

The Japanese First Army drew up an operation plan on April 4, 1943 for a mopping-up operation in the Taihang Mountains. Originally, the plan was to be carried out independently by the First Army. However, as negotiations to obtain the approval from the North China Area Army were carried out, the scale of the operation was expanded and elements of the Twelfth Army would also participate in the battle. The operation, which would begin on April 20, aimed to destroy the 24th Group Army first in southern Shanxi. Then, the Japanese Army would move northwest to destroy the headquarters of the Eighth Route Army and the 129th Division. The first phase of the operation was planned to take place from April 20 to April 27 and would involve twenty-six infantry battalions from the 36th, 37th, and 69th Divisions and 3rd and 4th Independent Mixed Brigades of the First Army and eight infantry battalions from the 35th Division of the Twelfth Army. The second phase would take place from April 28 to May 10 and would involve twenty-nine infantry battalions from the five participating units of the First Army and two thousand soldiers from the collaborationist Shanxi Anti-Communist Army. The 206th Independent Air Squadron would provide support for the whole operation.

=== Chinese nationalist view ===
In 1940, the Nationalist Hebei-Chahar military region, facing attacks by the Japanese Army and the Communist Army, withdrew from southern Hebei. As the Eighth Route Army continued expanding their base to Hebei Province, the 24th Group Army withdrew to the Taihang Mountains to established its guerilla base. In May 1942, the Japanese First Army launched a mopping-up operation against the Eighth Route Army in the Taihang Mountains. In June, the army conducted another operation in the Taihang district with the 24th Group Army as its target. In the "First Battle of the Taihang Mountains District", the Japanese North China Area Army inflicted heavy casualties on the 24th Group Army including the capture of divisional commander Liu Yueting (劉月亭) of the 3rd Provisional Division of the New 5th Army, but failed to destroy its base.

Since the First Battle of the Taihang Mountains, the 24th Group Army continued conducting reorganizations and operations in the area. In early April 1943, the 24th Group Army detected the build-up of the Japanese Army, estimated at roughly 50,000 men, at the outskirts of the Taihang Mountains. It was evident to the group army that another attack on its base was coming. On April 17, the headquarters of the 24th Group Army telegraphed General Jiang Dingwen, commander-in-chief of the First Military Region, and requested him to instruct neighboring friendly forces to actively conduct guerilla warfare. By April 20, the deployment of the Chinese and Japanese armies were complete.

=== Chinese communist view ===
During the Japanese summer mopping-up operations of the Taihang Mountains of 1942, the headquarters of the Eighth Route Army and its escorts had lagged behind from most of the Taihang Military Region troops and was intercepted at Guojiayu (郭家峪) by the Mashiko advance team (益子挺進隊), one of the two advance teams formed from the Japanese 36th Division which consisted of approximately 100 plainclothes troops tasked with infiltrating enemy defenses and capturing the leaders of the Eighth Route Army. In the ensuing breakout, the advance team wounded deputy commander Peng Dehuai and killed deputy chief-of-staff Zuo Quan. By June 19, after defeating the Nationalist 3rd Provisional Division near Lin County, the Japanese First Army launched its next phase to destroy the Nationalist 27th Army near Lingchuan and the Taihang Military Region of the Eighth Route Army returned to its base.

== Battle process ==
=== First phase ===
On April 20, the various participating units of the First Army began to depart from their initial deployment. Overcoming difficulties caused by the rugged terrain, the 36th Division broke through Nationalist positions near Shuzhang Town by the evening of April 21. Another section of the division defeated local Eighth Route Army troops and entered the western part of Lin County. At the same time, the 37th Division advanced towards the Lingchuan area and broke through Nationalist positions near Hengshui (横水). The 4th Independent Mixed Brigade entered the vicinity of Lin County and the 3rd Independent Mixed Brigade advanced towards Dongyaoji (東姚集). In these two days, the Japanese Army successively defeated the 8th Column, 27th Army, and 46th Separate Brigade.

In view of the smooth progress of the operation and based on intelligence which revealed the movement of the 24th Group Army, the various units of the First Army formed an encirclement around the Chinese units on April 22, and began to gradually tightened it by the morning of April 23. In the morning of April 24, General Sun Dianying led 2,038 of his troops to surrender to the Japanese 35th Division. Aside from army commander Sun Dianying, those who surrendered included the deputy army commander, the deputy divisional commander of the 4th Provisional Division, the chief of staff, the commander of the supply regiment, and the secretary. Meanwhile, the 37th Division pursued the retreating 27th Army and the 8th Reserve Division and 45th Division of the army were ordered to conduct maneuver warfare with the enemy southeast of Lingchuan. The 39th Division held on to Tianjiajing (田家井) for two bitter days despite very heavy losses.

On April 25, as General Pang Bingxun, commander-in-chief of the 24th Group Army, was accompanying the headquarters of the 40th Army to Lianhua Village (蓮花村), he learned that the New 5th Army, under the command of General Sun Dianying, had surrendered to the enemy. With the 27th Army broken up for operational warfare, the headquarters of the 24th Group Army and the headquarters of the 40th Army moved to establish contact with the 46th Separate Brigade. At the same time, the Japanese Army continued attacking the positions of the 106th Division at Baiyun Mountain (白雲山) and Dongyaoji and the 39th Division at Tianjiajing. In the early morning of April 26, the army headquarters and general headquarters advancing towards Shuicao'ao (水草凹) were intercepted by sections of the 36th and 37th Divisions near Sanjiaokou (三郊口) and lost more than half of its troops. By the afternoon, both headquarters had been scattered with most of the officers and soldiers killed or captured. Commander-in-chief Pang Bingxun was injured at the left leg and hid in a nearby cave. Army commander Ma Fawu was also wounded but was able to link up with the 46th Separate Brigade at Shuicao'ao. As the headquarters were being encircled, the guard battalion and the 117th Regiment of the 39th Division were also surrounded but managed to break out and went behind enemy lines to conduct guerilla warfare. The 37th Division continued its mopping-up operation against the 27th Army southeast of Lingchuan with the assistance of the 69th Division and dealt a heavy blow to the 137th Regiment of the 46th Division. The First Army prepared to conduct its second phase of the operation.

On April 29, the 36th Division engaged with the 8th Reserve Division near Hengshui and inflicted heavy casualties on the Chinese unit. The Chinese division moved to the vicinity to Shuzhang to continue maneuvering against the enemy. The 46th Separate Brigade continued covering the retreat of the headquarters of the 40th Army and engaged with a section of the 37th Division in several battles.

The 3rd Independent Mixed Brigade encountered very fierce resistance from approximately 2,000 troops of the 106th Division of the 40th Army near Dongyaoji. As a result, the Japanese First Army gathered three infantry battalions and the artillery and engineer units of the 3rd Independent Mixed Brigade, one infantry battalion of the 69th Division, two infantry companies and one artillery regiment (minus one battalion) of the 36th Division, and one company each of infantry, artillery, and engineer of the 4th Independent Mixed Brigade for the assault. During the battle, the Japanese Army fired a significant amount of poison gas shells. On April 28, the 36th Artillery Regiment fired 400 conventional shells and 100 "red canister" poison gas shells. On April 29, the artillery regiment fired 713 conventional shells and 181 red canister shells. By April 30, after nine days and nights of bitter fighting with more than a thousand casualties, the 106th Division was forced to abandon Dongyaoji and Baiyun Mountain. In the battle near Dongyaoji, the 3rd Independent Mixed Brigade suffered 54 killed and 106 wounded. Ida's engineer company of the 4th Independent Mixed Brigade suffered 10 killed and 13 wounded out of its 81 participating troops. On April 29 during the fiercest day of the attack, the 36th Artillery Regiment had 16 of its troops wounded.

On May 3, Second Lieutenant Tetsuo Tanaka (田中徹雄) of the 220th Infantry Regiment of the 35th Division, accompanied by Sun Dianying's secretary, led 10 troops to search for Pang Bingxun's hideout. They met with General Pang on May 4 and, after some negotiations, brought him to Xinxiang in the evening of May 6. For his role in securing General Pang Bingxun's surrender, Second Lieutenant Tanaka was personally presented a letter of commendation by the commander of the Twelfth Army on June 12. With the surrender of the enemy commander-in-chief, most participating units of the Japanese First Army finished their mopping-up operations against the remnants of the 24th Group Army and were ordered to move north in preparation for an attack on Communist forces. In the first phase of the operation from April 20 to May 3, 1943, the Japanese First and Twelfth Armies claimed 5,757 abandoned enemy corpses and 9,683 enemy POWs. Their own losses amounted to 239 killed and 766 wounded.

By the end of the first phase, the 40th Army alone had four to five thousand wounded officers and soldiers. Half of them were killed by Japanese troops before they could be evacuated and the other half were suffering due to lack of medicine and medical treatment and were exposed in the mountains. Dozens died every day due to a lack of food and water and all the horses which had not been killed in battle were slaughtered for food. The 27th Army until May 11 lost approximately three regiments in Lingchuan and other strongholds. Fan Longzhang (范龍章)'s 8th Column suffered more than 300 casualties in its two weeks of combat.

=== Second phase ===
The Japanese Army employed a new tactic for the second phase of the operation. They would form three rings of encirclement around the Communist base area in She County which would gradually tightened. For the first and second encirclement layers, infantry battalions were divided into several columns which would advance simultaneously towards She County. Each column would sent assault teams half a day in advance while also leaving behind a section of its forces along each encirclement line to prevent enemy escape. In the third encirclement line, the main attacking forces would eliminate any remaining enemy forces in the base. Chinese collaborationist troops were also deployed for garrison duties along the encirclement lines.

On May 6, the Japanese units began advancing towards the base area. The Eighth Route Army was well prepared for the encirclement campaign and had already moved the headquarters of the Eighth Route Army and 129th Division from the bases at Matian and She County to the outer lines for a counter mopping-up operation while leaving behind guerilla groups to persist within the inner lines. On May 8, the Japanese encirclement was completed as planned, but the main force of the Eighth Route Army had already evacuated the area and the Japanese Army did not achieve any major results. The military sub-districts of the Taihang Military Region of the Eighth Route Army began to attack the railway lines and stronghold behind enemy lines. On May 14, sections of the 3rd and 4th Independent Mixed Brigades and the 69th Division began a mopping-up operation north of Liao County to locate the headquarters of the Eighth Route Army and the 129th Division, but failed to destroy them. On May 16, sections of the 35th and 36th Divisions and the 4th Independent Mixed Brigade conducted a mopping-up operation against the New 10th Brigade north of Yushe.

The Eighth Route Army considered the counter mopping-up operation a great success with a complete retreat from the enemy conducting the mop-up and a large number of corpses and supplies abandoned. They claimed to have killed or wounded more than 2,000 Japanese and Chinese collaborationist troops and captured more than 500 collaborationist troops from May 5 to May 16 while suffering 142 killed and 237 wounded.

=== Supporting operations ===
Responding to Pang Bingxun's call for help, Jiang Dingwen ordered Ai Jiesan, deputy commander of the 84th Division of the 17th Army, to lead the 251st Regiment across the Yellow River and attack the enemy near Wangfang (王芳) on April 21. In the ensuing battle, the regiment was surrounded by enemy reinforcements, resulting in the death of the regiment commander Yang Shisheng and the injury of deputy divisional commander Ai Jiesan in addition to more than sixty other officers and soldiers casualties. The 8th and 13th Columns also launched their own supporting attacks against Japanese and Chinese collaborationist strongholds. On April 28, Jiang Dingwen mobilized the 4th and 36th Group Armies and 9th, 14th, 17th, and 47th Armies to cross the river north and support the Taihang Mountain operation. Alongside the Hebei People's Army, the Wen County militia, and various guerilla columns of the First Military Region, they participated in multiple guerilla actions throughout the second phase of the operation.

== Result ==
The Japanese Army summarized its result in the operation until May 31, 1943 as 9,913 abandoned corpses, 15,900 POWs, and 58,000 surrendered. Major surrenders included Pang Bingxun, commander-in-chief of the 24th Group Army, Sun Dianying, commander of the New 5th Army, Yang Kexian, commander of the 3rd Provisional Division, Wang Tingying, commander of the 4th Provisional Division, Niu Ruiting, deputy commander of the 4th Provisional Division, secretary Li Guo'an, 1 chief of staff, and 1 supply regiment commander. Of the 58,000 surrendered troops, 18,000 came from the regular army and 40,000 came from guerilla, county government, and miscellaneous troops.

On May 9, Pang Bingxun announced his participation in Wang Jingwei's peace movement and subsequently, on May 14, called on his former troops as well as civilians to cease hostilities. Bai Chongxi however asserted that Pang Bingxun had secretly sent a trusted confidant to inform Li Zhenqing, acting commander of the 40th Army, to cooperate with Liu Jin (劉進), commander of the 27th Army, in continued guerilla warfare. Due to the ambiguous attitude of the 27th and 40th Armies, the Japanese Army noticed that the number of surrendered troops were decreasing from a high 74,000. On May 24, the National Defense Conference of the Nanjing National Government appointed Pang Bingxun and Sun Dianying as members of the Military Commission.

In records obtained by the Japanese Army from both the Nationalists and the Communists, the Nationalists accused the Communists of taking advantage of the Japanese operation to attack the Nationalists, and the Communists accused the Nationalists of joining forces with the Japanese Army in adopting an anti-communist policy and that the attack was because the Nationalists did not want to surrender to Wang Jingwei. From documents seized and accounts from prisoners-of-war, the Japanese Army believed that the conflicts between the Kuomintang and Communist parties in the southern Taihang Region were quite serious. Furthermore, communications between the Chongqing armies were poor.

== Aftermath ==
The 40th Army of the 24th Group Army, which the Japanese Army believed to have surrendered in response to Pang Bingxun's call, suddenly changed its stance and attempted to move south and cross the Yellow River to make contact with the First Military Region. The Japanese Army also discovered that the 27th Army, a direct unit of the Chongqing Government, possessed a stronger fighting spirit than the other armies. While feigning acceptance of the 35th Division's surrender offers, the 27th Army followed the Japanese Army back to its original garrison. At the same time, it rallied troops who had fled and gone into hiding in various locations to restore its combat strength. In response, while still continuing its surrender offers, the North China Area Army mobilized the First and Twelfth Armies to mop up the remnants of the two armies, especially the 40th Army, and prevented their southward escape, starting 'Operation 40'

The 40th Army, as the main target of the operation, suffered very heavy losses as it desperately attempted to cross the river. At the night of May 31, as the special forces battalion and a section of the 117th Regiment of the 39th Division (totaling more than 470 troops) attempted to cross the south bank of the Qin River, they were suddenly attacked and encircled by Japanese and Chinese collaborationist troops and more than half were killed in action. The remaining more than 200 troops were captured on June 1 after running out of ammunition. At the same time, Feng Shutang (馮書堂), commander of the 1st Regiment of the 46th Separate Brigade, was leading the 2nd Battalion to Xiaogao (小高) when they were ambushed by Japanese troops. Except for a few survivors, the unit was completely wiped out and Feng Shutang was captured. On June 4, the main force of the 39th Division and sections of the 40th Army's artillery battalion and 46th Separate Brigade were crossing the north bank of Zaoshugou (棗樹溝) when they were intercepted by a large Japanese and Chinese collaborationist force and pummeled by aircraft and artillery. More than 700 were killed, wounded, or drowned attempting to cross the river. Sun Bingkun (孫秉琨), the chief of staff of the 39th Division, and Li Guogan (李國幹), commander of the 115th Regiment of the same division, were both wounded and unable to cross the river, leaving their fates unknown. To support the 40th Army's retreat, Jiang Dingwen ordered the Yellow River garrison of the First Military Region to actively launch guerilla warfare and target enemy strongholds. The 3rd Detachment of the 1st Advance Column was tasked with providing cover for the 40th Army's southward Yellow River crossing while also rescuing the army's wounded.

On June 7, Jiang Dingwen learned that the main force of the 40th Army had crossed the river to the south, but they had lost communication with the 106th Division on June 4 and the situation was unclear. On June 8, he telegraphed to Liu Jin informing him of the Central Government's order to keep holding the important guerilla bases of the Taihang Mountains with his 27th Army. On June 11, Chiang Kai-Shek also telegraphed Liu Jin informing him that the Taihang Mountains must be secured to prevent the enemy from moving south. On June 10, the 106th Division arrived near Shagou (沙溝) after crossing the Jincheng-Bo'ai Highway and telegraphed to the headquarters of the First Military Region the division's route to cross the river by the evening of June 12. After receiving the report, Jiang Dingwen ordered Wang Lianqing (王連慶), commander of the 94th Division of the 14th Army of the First Military Region, to lead two regiments to cross the river to the north and cover the 106th Division's crossing.

Meanwhile, the Japanese Army had learned about the 106th Division's movement and sent sections of the 35th and 36th Divisions on June 12 to defeat the division. The 106th Division engaged in a series of battles with enemy forces to break through the blockade and forced a crossing to the south. Finally, with the assistance of the 94th Division, both divisions made a safe crossing in the night of June 15. The 106th Division suffered more than 500 casualties in the three-day battle and the 94th Division also suffered hundreds of casualties. In the mopping-up operation against the 106th Division from June 6 to June 20, the Japanese Army claimed 1,025 abandoned enemy corpses and 720 POWs while suffering 23 killed and 43 wounded.

By early July 1943, the 27th Army remained the only regular Nationalist unit to persist in the Taihang Mountains. The Japanese Army mobilized the main forces of the 35th and 36th Divisions to eliminate the army after some failed surrender offers. On July 10, the 27th Army was surrounded by the Japanese First Army and communications between units were severed. Liu Jin personally led a section of the army to break out of the encirclement. On July 11, the 8th Reserve Division found itself fighting against both Japanese and Eighth Route Army troops in the northwest area of Shuzhang. As the division withdrew westward, it engaged in battles with a section of the 129th Division and was ambushed by the 778th Regiment of the Eighth Route Army as it moved south. Learning about the situation, commander-in-chief Jiang Dingwen ordered divisional commander Chen Xiaoqiang (陳孝強) not to retreat south and instead follow the orders of Liu Jin so it would not be broken up and defeated piecemeal by the Japanese Army or the Eighth Route Army. However, Chen Xiaoqiang did not heed his order and his troops were intercepted by the Eighth Route Army in the vicinity of Guxian Town. As the division was attempting to retreat, it was attacked by sections of the Japanese 36th and 69th Divisions and approximately 250 troops including divisional commander Chen Xiaoqiang were captured by the 84th Independent Infantry Battalion of the 69th Division. Yi Hui (易惠), the commander of the 22nd Regiment, was captured by the Eighth Route Army. Without a commander, the remnants of the 8th Reserve Division were ordered to cross the river south and abandon the Taihang Mountains.

The Japanese Army attempted to capitalize on its success, but the main force of the 27th Army had already dispersed and gone into hiding, intending to regroup after the Japanese withdrawal. On June 15, the second phase of the operation began with units of the First and Twelfth Armies conducting sweeps at the border area near Lingchuan. On June 24, the army was bolstered by the 1st Independent Mixed Brigade and a section of the newly-formed 62nd Division. With this new deployment, the Japanese Army conducted the third phase of the operation and launched multiple sweeps. By late July, the 27th Army was prepared to move south under cover from supporting forces of the First Military Region. Believing that the 27th Army had no way of recovering its strength and that Liu Jin had gone into hiding, the Japanese Army ended the operation on July 31. The result of the '1943 Summer Operation in the Taihang Mountains' was claimed as 1,371 abandoned enemy corpses and 4,853 POWs. Japanese casualties were reported as 25 killed and 84 wounded.

At the end of August 1943, Zhu De, commander-in-chief of the Eighth Route Army, sent a telegraph to Chiang Kai-Shek with a report from Liu Bocheng, commander of the 129th Division, which alleged that divisional commander Chen Xiaoqiang had defected to the Japanese Army after signing a non-aggression pact and a joint anti-communist agreement. The report claimed that Chen Xiaoqiang had participated in the Japanese Army's mopping-up operations in the Eighth Route Army's guerilla zone in May and June 1943 and that he had thus betrayed the country, resulting in clashes between the 129th Division and the 8th Reserve Division in July and the capture of regiment commander Yi Hui. It also alleged that the 27th Army had secret meetings with the Japanese Army in southern Shanxi and northern Henan to exchange information and army commander Liu Jin and divisional commander Chen Xiaoqiang were involved.

From the start of August to early September 1943, the 27th Army continued its southward retreat. On August 7, the 136th Regiment of the 46th Division and the 134th Regiment of the 45th Division covering the retreat of the main force were intercepted by Tang Tianji's troops of the Eighth Route Army. In the day-long battle, the 136th Regiment suffered heavy losses including two battalions of troops captured. On September 8, the last remaining troops of the 45th and 46th Divisions crossed the river southward near Wen County. With the loss of the Taihang Mountains, the Hebei-Chahar Military Region existed in name only as there were no more Nationalist presence in the Hebei and Chahar provinces. As a result of the operation, the Japanese 36th Division found that there were significant Communist presence in the Lingchuan area to replace the 27th Army. In August, the Eighth Route Army defeated Pang Bingxun's collaborationist troops in Lin County, Henan Province, forcing the 35th Division to interfere. The anti-communist operations near Lin County failed to stop the Eighth Route Army and sabotage of transportation and communication lines only intensified in the following weeks.

In one year and seven months of counter mopping-up operations in the Taihang Mountains, the 24th Group Army of the Hebei-Chahar Military Region were reported to have fought in more than 1,580 battles of varying sizes and suffered more than 29,000 killed, wounded, or missing.

== Merits ==
On April 23, Shang Zhicheng (尚志誠), commander of the 5th Company of the 316th Regiment of the 106th Division, led his troops to defend Baiyun Mountain. The company was supported by section commander Lei Xi'an (雷喜安)'s troops of the Special Services Squadron of the Advancing Separate Battalion led by Kou Wenzhang (寇文章), adjutant of the 106th Division with the rank of major. The two units held onto their positions against repeated enemy attacks, artillery, aircraft, and poison gas until April 29, by which point only 12 soldiers remained in the 5th Company and 21 soldiers remained in the Special Services Squadron. Kou Wenzhang, Lei Xi'an, and Shang Zhicheng were all badly wounded and platoon commander Zhu Xinwei of the 5th Company and section commander Qi Guichang were killed. In September 1943, Shang Zhicheng, Kou Wenzhang, and Lei Xi'an were awarded the 3rd, 6th, and 7th grades of the Order of the Cloud and Banner respectively for "outstanding merit in the battle of the Taihang Mountains."

In October 1943, Ma Fawu, commander of the 40th Army, and Liu Shirong (劉世榮), deputy commander of the 40th Army, were awarded the 3rd grade of the Order of the Sacred Tripod and the 4th grade of the Order of the Cloud and Banner respectively for "unwavering will, loyalty, and righteous in a moment of crisis. He swore to fight to the death and resolutely crossed south. His merit to the nation is truly worthy of commendation." Li Yuntong (李運通), commander of the 39th Division, and Cui Yuhai (崔玉海), deputy commander of the 39th Division, were awarded the 4th and 5th grades of the Order of the Cloud and Banner respectively for "fiercely fighting near Tianjiajing for six days and nights and inflicting a heavy blow to the enemy." Si Yuankai (司元愷), commander of the 46th Separate Brigade, was awarded the 5th grade of the Order of the Cloud and Banner for "defeating a superior enemy at the Donghuling and Xihuling area and inflicting heavy casualties." Li Zhenqing, commander of the 106th Division, was awarded the 4th grade of the Order of the Cloud and Banner for "holding onto Dongyaoji for nine days and nights, achieving remarkable results in smashing the enemy through skillful command."
