= USS LST-24 =

1943 LST-1-class tank landing ship

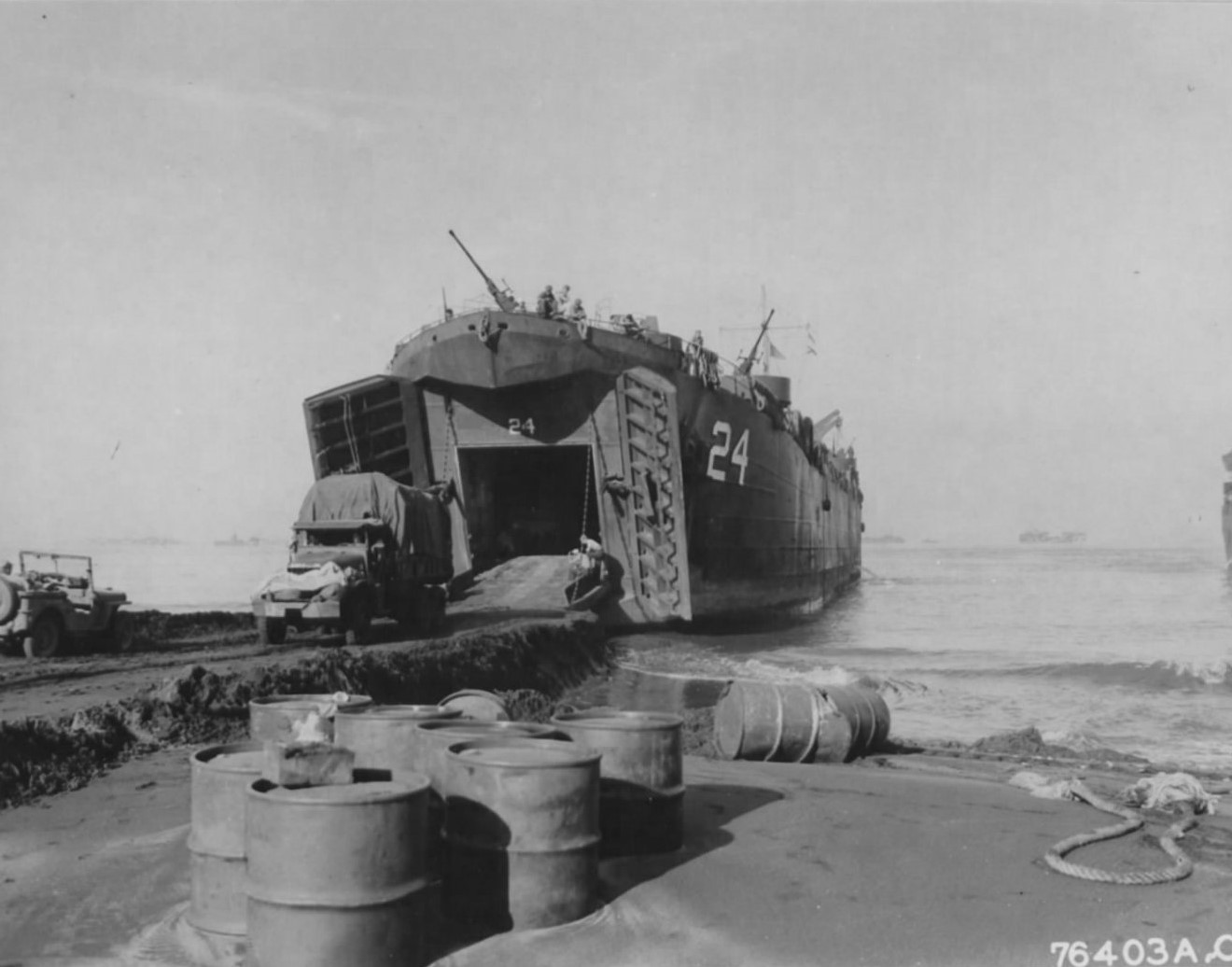
- Trucks and equipment of the US Army 1978th Engineering Aviation Battalion roll off of USS LST-24 after landing at Luzon Island, Philippines, 13 February 1945.

History

United States
- Name: LST-24
- Builder: Dravo Corporation, Pittsburgh, Pennsylvania
- Laid down: 19 November 1942
- Launched: 17 April 1943
- Sponsored by: Mrs. Marguerite E. Davis
- Commissioned: 3 May 1943, reduced commission; 14 June 1943, full commission
- Decommissioned: 26 February 1946
- Stricken: 5 June 1946
- Identification: Hull symbol: LST-24; Code letters: NYVM
- Honors and awards: 5 × battle stars
- Fate: Sold for commercial service, 8 October 1947

General characteristics
- Type: LST-1-class tank landing ship
- Displacement: 4,080 long tons (4,145 t) full load; 2,160 long tons (2,190 t) landing
- Length: 328 ft (100 m) oa
- Beam: 50 ft (15 m)
- Draft: Full load: 8 ft 2 in (2.49 m) forward; 14 ft 1 in (4.29 m) aft; Landing at 2,160 t: 3 ft 11 in (1.19 m) forward; 9 ft 10 in (3.00 m) aft
- Installed power: 2 × 900 hp (670 kW) Electro-Motive Diesel 12-567A diesel engines; 1,700 shp (1,300 kW)
- Propulsion: 1 × Falk main reduction gears; 2 × Propellers
- Speed: 12 kn (22 km/h; 14 mph)
- Range: 24,000 nmi (44,000 km; 28,000 mi) at 9 kn (17 km/h; 10 mph) while displacing 3,960 long tons (4,024 t)
- Boats & landing craft carried: 2 or 6 x LCVPs
- Capacity: 2,100 tons oceangoing maximum; 350 tons main deckload
- Troops: 16 officers, 147 enlisted men
- Complement: 13 officers, 104 enlisted men
- Armament: Varied, ultimate armament; 2 × twin 40 mm (1.57 in) Bofors guns; 4 × single 40 mm Bofors guns; 12 × 20 mm (0.79 in) Oerlikon cannons

Service record
- Part of: LST Flotilla 5; LST Flotilla 6
- Operations: Capture and occupation of Guam (8–12 August 1944); Morotai landings (15 September 1944); Leyte landings (18–31 October and 8–29 November 1944); Battle of Luzon Lingayen Gulf landings (4–18 January 1945); Okinawa Gunto operation (25 March–24 June 1945)
- Awards: American Campaign Medal; Asiatic–Pacific Campaign Medal; World War II Victory Medal; Philippine Republic Presidential Unit Citation; Philippine Liberation Medal

USS LST-24 was a United States Navy LST-1-class tank landing ship used exclusively in the Asiatic-Pacific Theater during World War II and manned by a United States Coast Guard crew. Like many of her class, she was not named and is properly referred to by her hull designation.

== Construction and commissioning ==
LST-24 was laid down on 19 November 1942, at Pittsburgh, Pennsylvania, by the Dravo Corporation; launched on 17 April 1943, sponsored by Mrs. Marguerite E. Davis, and placed in reduced commission on 3 May 1943. She was floated down the Ohio and Mississippi rivers to New Orleans, Louisiana, for her fitting out; and fully commissioned on 14 June 1943.

== Service history ==
LST-24 sailed from Galveston, Texas, on 29 July 1943, with Convoy HK 113 heading for Key West, Florida, where she arrived on 2 August 1943.

LST-24 operated in the New Georgia area from 1 to 6 February 1944, and in the Guadalcanal area from 7 to 28 February, that same year. In the latter area she was engaged in transporting cargo and personnel in the Russell Islands and Solomon Islands. On 4 April 1944, she was at Tutila, Samoa.

She participated in the capture and occupation of Guam during August 1944. She returned to Finschhaven on 11 September, and then went on to participate in the Western New Guinea campaign. She landed troops and equipment during the Morotai landings in September 1944, and then at the Leyte landings in the Philippines, participating in General Douglas MacArthur's promised liberation of the islands from the Japanese occupation, through October and November 1944. LST-24 was also at the Battle of Luzon Lingayen Gulf landings in January 1945. Proceeding by the way of Russell Islands and Guadalcanal, LST-24 reached Ulithi on 25 February 1945, and then Manila. She departed Manila on 21 March, stopping at Tacloban and arrived at Hollandia on 24 March 1945. She then went on to participate in the assault and occupation of Okinawa Gunto from March through June 1945.

LST-24 finished her combat career with the assault and occupation of Okinawa Gunto from the end of March until 24 June 1945, when she departed for San Francisco via Pearl Harbor, arriving there on 9 December 1945. From there she proceeded to Galveston via San Diego and the Canal Zone.

== Postwar career ==
She was decommissioned and her Coast Guard crew removed on 16 February 1946. She was struck from the Navy list on 5 June 1946. On 23 December 1947, she was sold to the Humble Oil & Refining Co., of Houston, Texas, and was converted for merchant service.

== Honors and awards ==
LST-24 earned five battle stars for her World War II service.

== Bibliography ==
- "LST-24". Dictionary of American Naval Fighting Ships. Naval History and Heritage Command. 1 June 2015. This article incorporates text from this source, which is in the public domain.
- "USS LST-24". NavSource. 16 May 2014.
- "Convoy HK.113". Arnold Hague Convoy Database.
- "USS LST-24" (PDF). United States Coast Guard. This article incorporates text from this source, which is in the public domain.
