= 93rd Infantry Division (United States) =

"Colored" infantry division in WW1 and WW2

93rd Division 93rd Infantry Division (Colored)
- 93rd Infantry Division shoulder sleeve insignia
- Active: December 1917–9 February 1919 (Provisional); 23 February 1942–3 February 1946 (Army of the United States)
- Country: United States
- Branch: United States Army
- Type: Provisional Division (1917-1919); Infantry (1942-1946)
- Size: Division
- Nicknames: Casques Bleus; The Blue Helmets
- Engagements: World War I (Note: The Division's regiments never fought as a single force together during World War I as they were placed under the command of the French 26th, 157th, and 161st Divisions by July 1st, 1918 due to segregation in the AEF.); German spring offensive; Second Battle of the Marne; World War II; New Guinea; Western New Guinea campaign; Admiralty Islands campaign; Battle of Morotai; Northern Solomons; Bougainville campaign; Liberation of the Philippines (Note: 368th Infantry Regiment only. It was also the only unit of the division to be awarded the Philippine Liberation Medal.)

Commanders
- Notable commanders: Charles P. Hall; Harry H. Johnson

The 93rd Infantry Division was a "colored" segregated unit of the United States Army in World War I and World War II. However, in World War I only its four infantry regiments, two brigade headquarters, and a provisional division headquarters were organized, and the divisional and brigade headquarters were demobilized in May 1918. Its four regiments fought primarily under French command in that war and saw action during the Second Battle of the Marne. They acquired the nickname Blue Helmets (French: Casques Bleus) from the French, as these units were issued horizon blue French Adrian helmets. Consequently, its shoulder patch became a blue French helmet, to commemorate its service with the French Army during the German spring offensive. The division never fought as a whole and was considered "provisional" during its entire two years existence, thus was not given any campaign credits from World War I by the U.S. Army.

The division saw service in the Pacific Theater during World War II, but saw little fighting. The division was reactivated with the "colored" infantry designation on 15 May 1942 at Fort Huachuca, Arizona, and shipped to Guadalcanal in 1944. Most of its regiments were mainly used as construction units and in defensive operations in the South Pacific. In 1946, the 93rd Infantry Division was inactivated, it had suffered 12 killed in action throughout the war. The lineage of several of its units are carried on by units in the Illinois and Maryland Army National Guards.

== History ==
=== World War I ===
The 93rd was known initially as the 93rd Division (Provisional). Only the infantry brigades were formed, which fought under French command. The 185th Infantry Brigade was initially commanded by Albert H. Blanding and the 186th by George Herbert Harries. The unit became known as the 93rd Division and was composed of the following regiments:

185th Brigade (Infantry)

- 369th Infantry Regiment ("The Harlem Hellfighters"; formerly the 15th Infantry Regiment, New York National Guard). Now the 719th Transportation Company, 369th Sustainment Brigade.
- 370th Infantry Regiment ("The Black Devils"; formerly the 8th Infantry Regiment of the Illinois National Guard). Awarded the Fourragère. Now lineage is carried on by the 1st Battalion, 178th Infantry, Illinois National Guard.

186th Brigade (Infantry)

- 371st Infantry Regiment (1st Provisional Infantry Regiment, National Army was drawn from black draftees)
- 372nd Infantry Regiment Made up of troops of the 1st Separate Battalion, District of Columbia National Guard; 1st Separate Company, Connecticut National Guard; Company L, Massachusetts National Guard; 9th Separate Battalion, Ohio National Guard; 1st Separate Company, Maryland National Guard; and 250 draftees from Camp Custer, Michigan. Now its lineage is carried on by the 229th Main Support Battalion, Maryland National Guard, and the 372nd Military Police Battalion, District of Columbia National Guard.

The division was activated in December 1917 and sent to France; however, the troops never fought together as a division, and in fact, the provisional division headquarters was demobilized in May 1918. Over the objections of the division's commander, Brig. Gen. Roy Hoffman (appointed 15 December 1917), its brigades were broken up and the regiments brigaded with French Army formations. They were issued French equipment and arms but wore US uniforms; the "blue hat" nickname is derived from the blue-painted Casque Adrian helmets they wore.

Each regiment was brigaded with French forces for three time periods: 1 to 21 July 1918; from 1 August 1918; and from 24 October 1918 to the armistice:

Regiment	From 1 to 21 July 1918	From 1 August to 23 October 1918	from 24 October to 11 November 1918
369th Infantry Regiment:	IV French Army	161st French Division	Fourth Army (France)
370th Infantry Regiment:	II French Army	26th French Division	Tenth Army (France)
371st Infantry Regiment:	XIII French Army	157th French Infantry Division	Second Army (France)
372nd Infantry Regiment:	XIII French Army	157th French Infantry Division	Second Army (France)

The regiments that later formed the 93rd were originally sent to France to be converted into badly needed labor units. However, the outcry by African-American leaders including W. E. B. Du Bois and A. Philip Randolph forced the US to reconsider. The alternative would be the potential loss of needed African-American recruits for labor and service units.

Four independent regiments were chosen to assume the designations of the 93rd (Provisional) Infantry Division's regiments (369th, 370th, 371st, and 372nd Infantry). The problem was, where to place them?

The main American Expeditionary Force (AEF) refused to have African-American soldiers in combat. Ironically, the commander of the AEF, General John Joseph "Black Jack" Pershing had earned his nickname and reputation as an officer in the 10th Cavalry Regiment, then still a black Buffalo Soldier regiment. While Pershing was an early supporter of having "colored" soldiers in the military, he seems to have bowed to political expediency in this case.

The British already had several American divisions under their command. This was due to a deal struck with the American armed forces, which had no transport fleet when they entered the war. The United Kingdom and their Commonwealth allies would transport six American divisions by sea to Europe. Then the American divisions would be folded into British Corps. The French had a similar deal where they exchanged the Americans' 3-inch guns for early-model French 75 mm cannon to simplify the supply of ammunition and Chauchat light machineguns to replace the Americans' scarce Lewis Guns. In return, they demanded that American troops be placed under their command to replace their early-war losses.

==== Combat chronicle ====
The regiments fought in several battles alongside French troops, who were already used to colonial North and Sub-Saharan African "colored" soldiers (noirs). All regiments acquitted themselves well and received unit citations from the French. Numerous individual soldiers exhibited extraordinary heroism and were highly decorated by the French. These include Cpl. Freddie Stowers and Sgt. Henry Johnson, who decades after their deaths would be awarded the American Medal of Honor. The division's shoulder patch, with its blue French Adrian helmet, commemorated this period.

Total casualties from all regiments were 3,167, with 523 killed in action and 2,644 wounded. The 93rd Division had two Medal of Honor recipients—Lt. George S. Robb, Sgt. Henry Johnson and Cpl. Freddie Stowers—75 Distinguished Service Crosses and 527 Croix de Guerre medals.

==== The Red Hand Division ====
In May 1918, French General Mariano Goybet was ordered to command the French 157th Infantry Division, which had been devastated after the Third Battle of the Aisne. On 4 July 1918, it was reconstituted by putting together the 333rd Infantry Regiment (French) with two of the U.S. 93rd's regiments—the 371st and 372nd.

General Goybet took special notice of the fact this was the first 4 July to be celebrated by his now Franco-American Division.

It is striking demonstration of the long standing and blood-cemented friendship which binds together our two great nations. The sons of the soldiers of Lafayette greet the sons of the soldiers of George Washington who have come over to fight as in 1776, in a new and greater way of independence. The same success which followed the glorious fights for the cause of liberty is sure to crown our common effort now and bring about the final victory of right and justice over barbarity and oppression.

— General Goybet, 157th Infantry Division

The rebuilt 157th Division participated in the Second Battle of the Marne. With violent attacks, General Goybet broke the enemy front at Monthois, capturing many prisoners and a considerable amount of materiel in the process. Afterward, he occupied the Vosges, re-capturing Sainte-Marie-aux-Mines.

General Order No. 234 (8 October 1918):

I am proud to forward you herewith the thanks and congratulations of General Garnier-Duplessix and I want at the same time, dear friends of all ranks Americans and French, to tell you as your leader and as soldier, from the bottom of my heart how grateful, I am to you all for the glory you have acquired for our splendid 157th Division. In these nine hard days of battle you have pushed ahead for eight kilometers, fought powerful enemy organization, captured close to 600 prisoners, taken 15 guns light and heavy, 20 infantry Mortars and artillery ammunition and brought down by rifle 3 aeroplanes. The red hand of this division is now in truth a blood-reeking hand. I grappled the Boche at the throat and made him yell for mercy. Our glorious comrades who died are well avenged.

— General Goybet, commander of the 157th Division

==== Racism in the army ====
Despite African American troops being conscripted to fight in WWI this did not mean that they were on equal terms to their white American comrades. Early twentieth century American segregation followed these soldiers overseas and they were discriminated against in the same ways that their fellow African Americans were in the United States. For example, the army implemented segregated barbershops and bathrooms, whilst also giving African Americans their own living stations to limit the interactions they had with French locals.

=== World War II ===
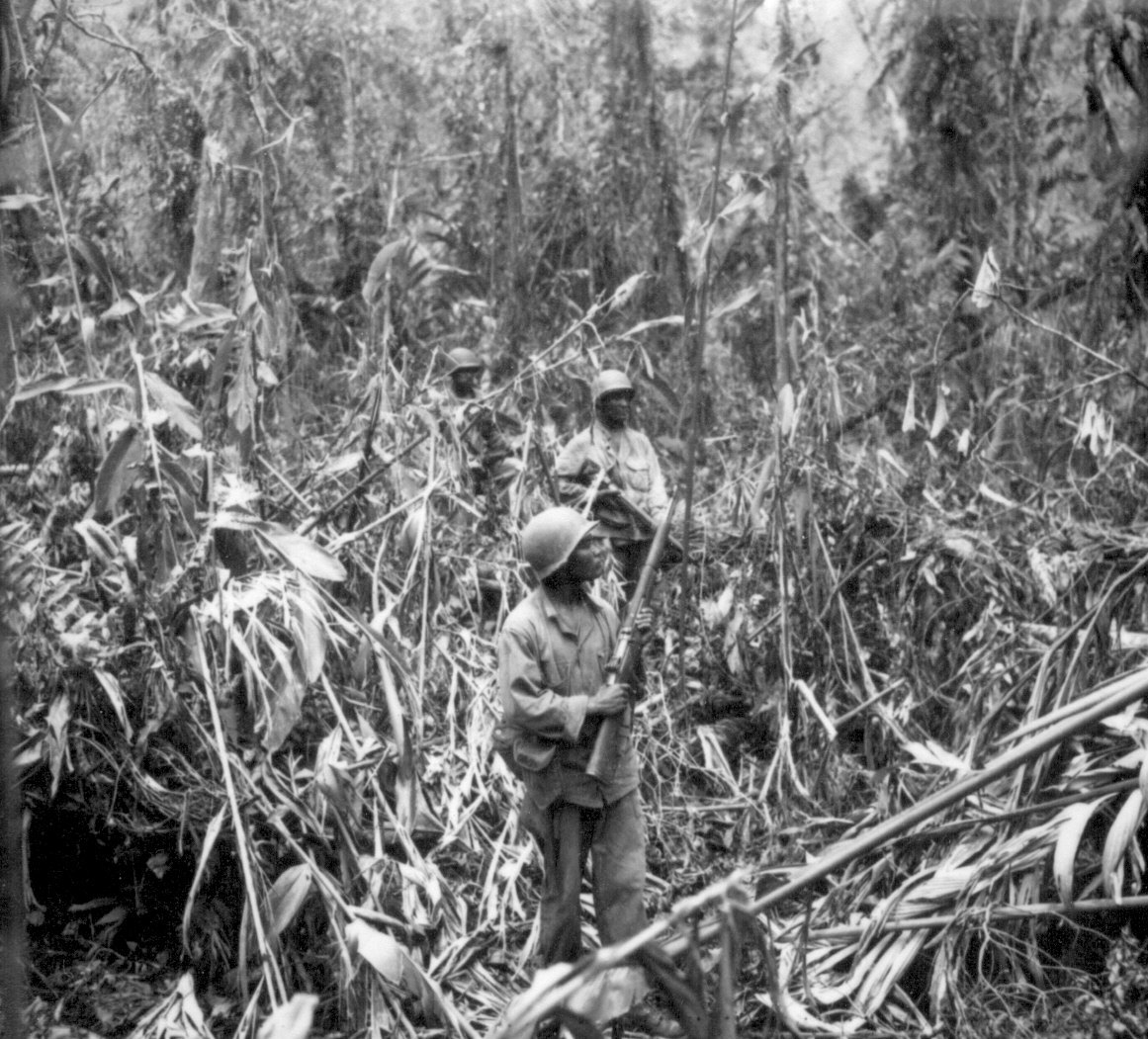
1 May 1944, members of the 93rd Division on the Numa-Numa Trail, Bougainville.

- Activated: 15 May 1942. 368th, 369th & 25th Inf Regts
- Trained at Camp Coxcomb and Camp Clipper in California 1943.
- Overseas: 24 January 1944.
- Campaigns: New Guinea, Northern Solomons (Bougainville), Bismarck Archipelago (Admiralty Islands)
- Awards: DSC: 1; DSM: 1; SS: 5; LM: 5; SM: 16; BSM: 686; AM: 27.
- Commanders: Maj. Gen. Charles P. Hall (May–October 1942), Maj. Gen. Fred W. Miller(October 1942 – May 1943), Maj. Gen. Raymond G. Lehman (May 1943 – August 1944), Maj. Gen. Harry H. Johnson (August 1944 – September 1945), Brig. Gen. Leonard R. Boyd (September 1945 to inactivation).
- Returned to United States: 1 February 1946.
- Inactivated: 3 February 1946.

==== Division organization ====
The 93rd Infantry Division was activated in the Army of the United States on 15 May 1942 and consisted of the following units.

93rd Infantry Division organization (click to enlarge)

- 93rd Infantry Division
  - 93rd Infantry Division Headquarters
  - 93rd Cavalry Reconnaissance Troop (Mechanized) (M3 scout cars and then M8 Greyhound armored cars)
  - 25th Infantry Regiment
    - Headquarters and Headquarters Company
    - 3× Infantry battalions
      - each battalion consists of: 1× Headquarters and Headquarters Company, 3× Rifle companies, 1× Heavy Weapons Company
    - Cannon Company (T12 Gun Motor Carriages and T19 Howitzer Motor Carriages, later replaced by either M3 105mm towed howitzers or M7 Priest self propelled howitzers)
    - Anti-Tank Company (M3 37mm anti-tank guns, which were replaced by 1944 with M1 57mm anti-tank guns)
    - Service Company
  - 368th Infantry Regiment
    - same organization as 25th Infantry Regiment
  - 369th Infantry Regiment
    - same organization as 25th Infantry Regiment
  - 93rd Infantry Division Artillery
    - Headquarters and Headquarters Battery
    - 593rd Field Artillery Battalion
      - Headquarters and Headquarters Battery
      - 3× Batteries (M2 105mm towed howitzers)
      - Service Battery
    - 594th Field Artillery Battalion
      - same organization as 593rd Field Artillery Battalion
    - 595th Field Artillery Battalion
      - same organization as 593rd Field Artillery Battalion
    - 596th Field Artillery Battalion
      - Headquarters and Headquarters Battery
      - 3× Batteries (M1 155mm towed howitzers)
      - Service Battery
  - Headquarters Special Troops
    - Headquarters Company, 93rd Infantry Division
    - 93rd Signal Company
    - 93rd Quartermaster Company
    - 793rd Ordnance Light Maintenance Company
    - Military Police Platoon
    - 93rd Infantry Division Band (attached)
  - 318th Engineer Combat Battalion
    - Headquarters and Headquarters and Service Company
    - 3× Engineer combat companies
  - 318th Medical Battalion
    - Headquarters and Headquarters Detachment
    - 3× Collecting companies
    - Clearing Company

==== Combat chronicle ====
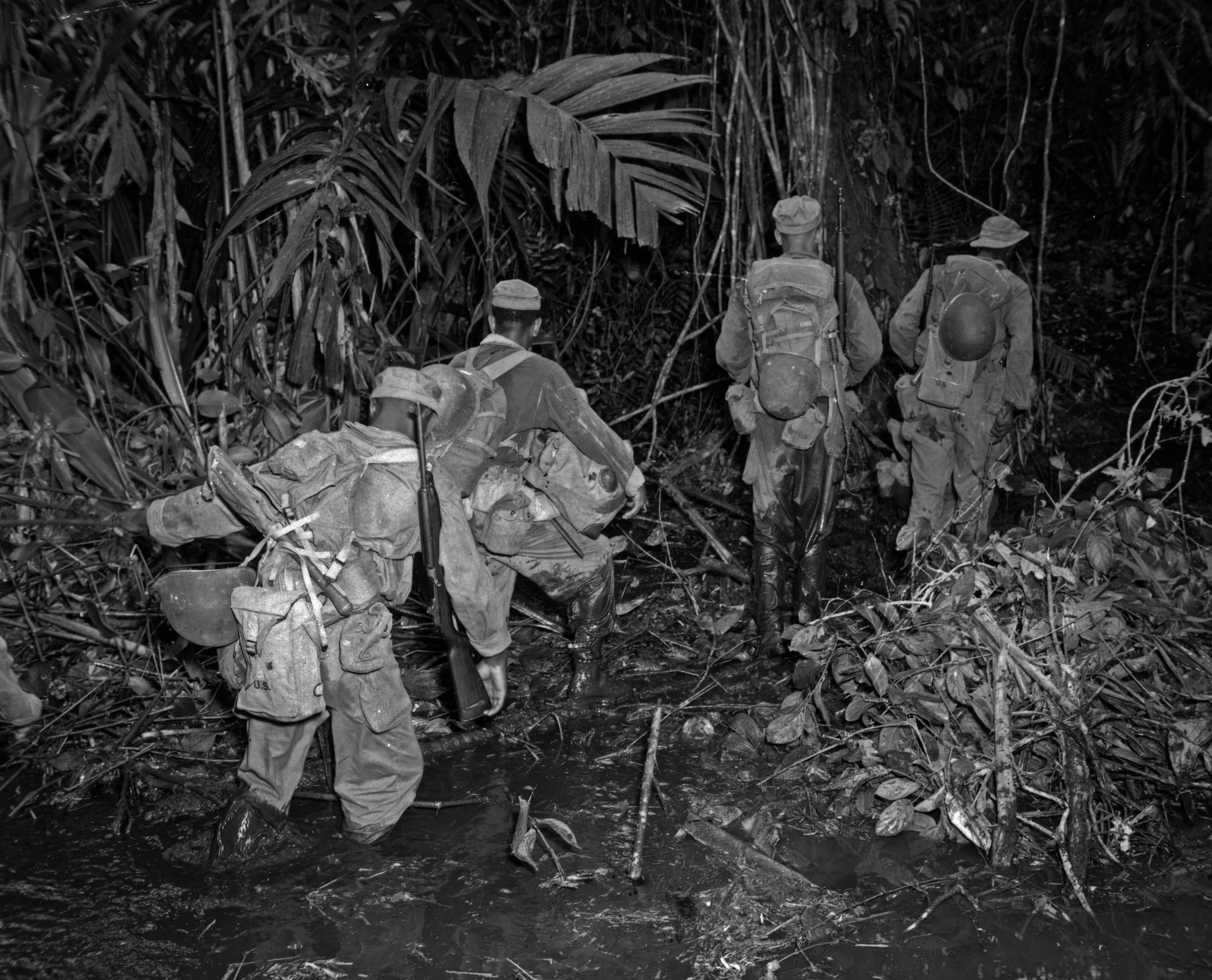
En route to Hill 165, members of 93rd Div. struggle through some clinging mud along the east–west trail on an island in the South Pacific. April 15, 1944.

An advance party of the 93rd Infantry Division arrived at Guadalcanal on 29 January 1944. The rest of the division landed between 6 February and 5 March, one regiment disembarking at the Russell Islands on 7 February. The bulk of the division engaged in training, labor and security duties on Guadalcanal and the Treasury Islands from 7 June and both Hollandia Dutch New Guinea from 30 October. In August 1944, Major General Harry H. Johnson, the former commander of the 2nd Cavalry Division, assumed command of the Division, relieving Major General Lehman, who had returned to the United States for medical reasons. He would lead the division through the remainder of the war, including the New Guinea-Philippines campaign. Component units performed similar duties on Finschhafen from 12 October 1944 to 31 March 1945, on Los Negros from 29 September 1944 to 16 March 1945, and on Biak from 10 October 1944 to 1 October 1945. The division's combat elements moved to Bougainville Island on 28 March 1944, and were attached to the Americal Division on the 30th. On that date they entered combat, assisting in attacks on the enemy perimeter. These elements, including the 25th RCT, reconnoitered across the Laruma River on 2 April, and in the Torokina River Valley from 7–12 April 1944. The 25th RCT operated against the Japanese along the Kuma and East-West Trails during May 1944. The combat team left for the Green Islands during May and June. The 93d Rcn. Troop, attached to the XIV Corps, remained to raid, patrol, and maintain perimeter positions. The troop began training 12 September 1944, and moved to Finschhafen on 1 November. Security patrols had scattered contacts with the enemy at Urapas from 3 to 15 January 1945, at Wardo on Biak from 6 November-22 December, and at Wari on Biak on 31 December. The security detachments at Wardo and Wari were withdrawn on 9–10 February 1945.

Almost all of the Division occupied Morotai, Dutch New Guinea, from 4 April to 21 October 1945. Scattered skirmishes occurred along the northwestern sector of the island. The 93rd continued its labor and security missions. It occupied Sansapor from 5 April to 10 July 1945, Middleburg Island from 5 April to 7 October 1945, and Noemfoor Island from 13 April to 7 June 1945. The Division then moved to Zamboanga, Philippine Islands, where it remained from 1 July 1945 to 7 January 1946. Patrols encountered light resistance until the end of hostilities, 15 August 1945. Palawan was occupied from 2 July to 5 December 1945, Jolo from 1 July to 2 October 1945, and Sanga-Sanga from 3 July 1945 to 6 January 1946. The Division arrived at Mindanao on 9 October 1945, moved to Tacloban, Leyte on 13 January 1946, and left for home on 17 January 1946.

While on Jolo on 17 July 1945, a patrol from the 368th was ambushed by a Japanese force three times its size. When the firefight began, Staff Sergeant Leonard E. Dowden moved his squad to within 30 yards of the enemy. He then crawled forward alone to assault a machine-gun position with grenades, despite being gravely wounded. He would be killed by a burst of fire as he was about to throw a grenade. The patrol was able to fight off the enemy attack with only 18 casualties. For the extraordinary heroism that cost him his life, Staff Sergeant Dowden received the Distinguished Service Cross. Originally from New Orleans, Louisiana, Staff Sergeant Dowden was the only member of the 93rd Infantry Division to earn the DSC during the war.

==== Morotai ====
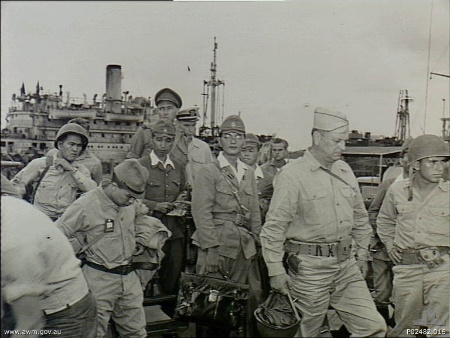
The Japanese commanding officers at Halmahera land at Morotai to surrender to the 93rd Infantry Division

For the remainder of the war, the division would find itself fighting on Morotai. In April 1945, the division conducted intensive patrols with the aim of destroying the remaining Japanese forces on the island. At this time most of the Japanese on Morotai were located along the island's west coast, and generally stayed close to native gardens. The 93rd Division landed patrols along Morotai's west and north coasts from late April onwards, and these fought scattered skirmishes with small Japanese forces. One of the division's main goals was to capture Colonel Kisou Ouchi, commander of the 211th Regiment, 32nd Division, and this was achieved by a patrol from the 25th Infantry Regiment on 2 August 1945. Ouchi was the highest ranking Japanese officer to be captured before the end of the war.

==== End of the war ====
After the Japanese capitulation in August 1945, the division secured the surrender of 41,000 Japanese troops and civilians on Morotai and the nearby Halmahera islands of the Dutch East Indies. Included were 37,000 troops, of whom 5,000 were in a naval force and 4,000 were civilians. The surrender was accepted on Morotai by Major General Johnson. Lt. General Ishii, the commander of the IJA 32nd Division and the senior surviving officer in the area, surrendered the Japanese Army forces to the 93rd after he was brought to Morotai on a U.S. Navy PT boat.

After the signing Ishii asked Maj. General Johnson if he and his officers would be allowed to retain their samurai swords. Johnson refused and afterwards commented: "Never again will the Japanese have the means, the Army or the inclination to be an aggressor nation. We cannot allow these people to keep any semblance of military might."

==== Casualties ====
- Total battle casualties: 133
- Killed in action: 12
- Wounded in action: 121

== Popular culture ==
The 93rd infantry regiment appeared in the video game Call of Duty: Vanguard during the battle of Bougainville.

== Division insignia ==
- Shoulder patch: Black circle containing blue Adrian helmet.

== See also ==
- Military history of African Americans
