= William Payne Jackson =

United States Army general (1868–1945)

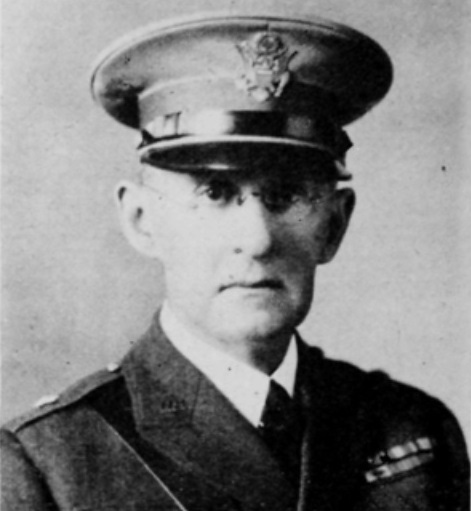
- From the July 1945 edition of Assembly magazine
- Born: January 9, 1868; Palmyra, Missouri, U.S.
- Died: January 13, 1945 (aged 77); San Francisco, California, U.S.
- Burial place: San Francisco National Cemetery
- Spouse: Julia Crosby Carr
- Children: 1
- Military career
- Allegiance: United States
- Service: United States Army
- Service years: 1891–1932
- Rank: Brigadier General (Army); Major General (Retired list)
- Service number: 0-341
- Unit: U.S. Army Infantry Branch
- Commands: 64th Infantry Regiment; 368th Infantry Regiment; 74th Infantry Brigade; Forwarding Camp, Le Mans, France; 53rd Infantry Regiment; Citizens' Military Training Camp, Camp Grant; 1st Coast Artillery District; 2nd Infantry Brigade; 1st Infantry Division; 98th Infantry Division
- Conflicts: American Indian Wars; Spanish–American War; Philippine–American War; Moro Rebellion; Pancho Villa Expedition; World War I Occupation of the Ruhr
- Awards: Army Distinguished Service Medal; Silver Star (2); Croix de guerre (Belgium); Legion of Honor (Officer) (France); Meritorious Military Service Medal (Missouri)

William Payne Jackson (January 9, 1868 – January 13, 1945) was a career officer in the United States Army. A veteran of the American Indian Wars, Spanish–American War, Philippine–American War, Moro Rebellion, Pancho Villa Expedition, and World War I, he attained the rank of brigadier general during his career and major general on the army's retired list.

Jackson was best known for his command of the 368th Infantry Regiment, 74th Infantry Brigade, 1st Coast Artillery District, 2nd Infantry Brigade, 1st Infantry Division, and 98th Infantry Division. He was a recipient of the Army Distinguished Service Medal, and Silver Star, as well as several foreign awards and decorations.

== Early life ==
William P. Jackson was born in Palmyra, Missouri on January 9, 1868, the son of William James Jackson and Russelle (Claggett) Jackson. He attended the schools of Palmyra, and in 1887 received an appointment to the United States Military Academy (West Point) from U.S. Representative William H. Hatch. He graduated in 1891 ranked 44th of 65 and received his commission as a second lieutenant of Infantry.

== Start of career ==
Initially assigned to the 24th Infantry Regiment, Jackson served in Arizona Territory during the American Indian Wars. including postings at Fort Bowie (1891–1892) and Fort Huachuca (1892–1894). From August 1892 to October 1893 he performed detached duty with the United States and Mexican Boundary Commission. From November 1894 to October 1895, Jackson attended an electrical and underwater mining course at Willets Point, Queens. (Note: The Engineer School of Application at Willets Point taught the use of mines for harbor defense.) From October 1895 to October 1896 he served with the 24th Infantry at Fort Bayard Historic District, New Mexico Territory. From October 1896 to April 1898, Jackson served at Fort Douglas, Utah, and in March 1898 he was promoted to first lieutenant in the 2nd Infantry Regiment.

During the Spanish–American War, Jackson served with the 2nd Infantry during organization and training at Chickamauga, Georgia and Tampa, Florida during April and May, 1898. Beginning in May, he served at Headquarters, 1st Division, Fifth Army Corps as aide-de-camp to the division commander, Major General Jacob Ford Kent. Jackson served in Cuba at Siboney, Sevillia, and Fort San Juan. He was on sick leave in September and October, and in November joined the 24th Infantry at Fort D. A. Russell, Wyoming.

Jackson served in Wyoming until June 1899, including temporary duty at Wardner, Idaho during the 1899 Coeur d'Alene labor confrontation. He then sailed for the Philippines, where he served as adjutant of a 24th Infantry battalion and acted as regimental adjutant. He was recommended for promotion to captain by brevet for heroism during fighting in Pangasinan province. He was promoted to captain in the 3rd Infantry Regiment in November 1900, joined his regiment as quartermaster in May 1901, and returned to the United States in March 1902.

From March 1902 to June 1904, Jackson served with the 3rd Infantry at Fort Thomas, Kentucky. From June 1904 to July 1906, he served in Alaska, first at Skagway, then at Fort William H. Seward. From July to August 1906, he was posted to Fort Lawton, Washington, and from August 1906 to March 1907 he was assigned to Fort George Wright, Washington. He served again at Fort Lawton from March to August 1909.

== Continued career ==
From September 1909 to April 1912, Jackson served again in the Philippines, this time during the Moro Rebellion, and he was assigned first to Zamboanga, then to Sulu. He was promoted to major in April 1912, and served at Madison Barracks, New York from June 1912 to August 1913. Jackson was assigned to inspector general duty in August 1913, and served until January 1917. He performed Pancho Villa Expedition duty in El Paso, Texas from January to May 1917, when he was promoted to lieutenant colonel in the 20th Infantry Regiment.

Jackson served with the 20th Infantry at Fort Douglas from May to August 1917, when he received promotion to temporary colonel as commander of the 64th Infantry Regiment, which he led during its World War I organization and training in El Paso. In October 1917, Jackson was assigned to command the 368th Infantry Regiment at Fort Meade, Maryland. He oversaw the regiment's organization and training and led it to France in June 1918.

Upon arrival in France, Jackson was promoted to temporary brigadier general and assigned to command the 74th Infantry Brigade, a unit of the 37th Division. Jackson led his brigade during several battles, including Meuse–Argonne and Ypres–Lys. After the Armistice of November 11, 1918 ended the war, Jackson served on post-war occupation duty as commander of the Forwarding Camp for demobilizing soldiers in Le Mans.

== Later career ==
Upon returning to the United States in June 1919, Jackson served with the 7th Division at Camp Funston, Kansas. He was reduced to the permanent rank of lieutenant colonel in August 1919, and attended the United States Army Command and General Staff College at Fort Leavenworth, Kansas from August 1919 to July 1920. In January 1920, he was promoted to the permanent rank of colonel. From July to October 1920, Jackson was a student at the United States Army War College. From October 1920 to August 1921, Jackson commanded the 53rd Infantry Regiment at Camp Grant, Illinois. In the summer of 1921, Jackson also commanded the Citizens' Military Training Camp that took place at Camp Grant.

Jackson served as assistant chief of staff for logistics (G-4) for Second Corps Area at Fort Jay, New York from September 1921 to July 1924. He served as the Second Corps Area's chief of staff from July 1924 to June 1925. From October 1925 to May 1926, he was in charge of Army National Guard affairs on the Fifth Corps Area staff at Fort Hayes, Ohio. Jackson was promoted to permanent brigadier general in May 1926.

From May to November 1926, Jackson completed first the Coast Artillery School at Fort Monroe, Virginia, then the Air Corps School at Langley Field, Virginia. From November 1926 to November 1929, he commanded the 1st Coast Artillery District, headquartered in Boston. In November 1929, Jackson was assigned to command the 2nd Infantry Brigade at Madison Barracks. While commanding the 2nd Brigade, Jackson performed additional duty as commander of the 98th Division, a unit of the Organized Reserve Corps. From January to March 1930, Jackson served as acting commander of the 1st Infantry Division. Jackson retired upon reaching the mandatory retirement age of 64 in January 1932.

== Awards ==
Jackson was a recipient of the Army Distinguished Service Medal for his World War I service. In addition, he received two Citation Stars for heroism, one for the Spanish–American War and one for the Philippine–American War; when the Silver Star was created in 1932, his Citation Stars were converted to the new medal. Jackson also received the Belgian Croix de guerre and French Legion of Honor (Officer). In addition, he was a recipient of the Missouri Meritorious Military Service Medal.

In 1935, the Civilian Conservation Corps facility near Palmyra, Missouri was named Camp William P. Jackson. In July 1942, the United States Congress passed legislation permitting the general officers of World War I to be advanced one grade on the retired list if they had been recommended in writing during the war for a promotion they did not receive, and if they had received the Medal of Honor, Distinguished Service Cross, or Army Distinguished Service Medal. Under these criteria, Jackson was eligible for promotion to major general, and he was advanced on the retired list.

== Death and burial ==
In retirement, Jackson was a resident of San Francisco. He died in San Francisco on January 13, 1945. He was buried at San Francisco National Cemetery.

== Family ==
In 1903, Jackson married Julia Crosby Carr (1876–1962). They were the parents of a daughter, Margaret Carr Jackson (1907–2001), the wife of Eugene Vivian Slattery (1905–1990).
