= 32nd Division (Imperial Japanese Army) =

- Active: 1939–1945
- Country: Japan
- Branch: Imperial Japanese Army
- Type: Infantry
- Nickname: Maple Division
- Engagements: Second Sino-Japanese War; Battle of Morotai

Commanders
- Notable commanders: Heitarō Kimura

The Imperial Japanese Army's 32nd Division (第32師団, Dai-sanjūni Shidan) was an infantry division during World War II. Its call sign was the Maple Division (楓兵団, Kaede Heidan). The division was raised 7 February 1939 in Tokyo, simultaneously with 33rd, 34th, 35th, 36th and 37th divisions.

== Action ==
The 32nd Division was subordinated to the 12th Army and transferred to China in May 1939 to participate in the Second Sino-Japanese War, initially posted to Shanxi. Due to the Japanese defeat in the Battle of Suixian–Zaoyang, the initially assigned positions became unreachable and the 32nd Division arrived in southeast Shandong in June 1939 and saw action in the 1939–40 Winter Offensive, initially protecting the Tai'an - Tengzhou line. The division was able to start a counter-attack on 2 December 1939 as part of the Shandong Operation. After the offensive, the 32nd Division was garrisoned at Jinan.

In April 1944, the 32nd Division was assigned to the 14th Army and departed for Mindanao. The 32nd Division suffered heavy losses from United States Navy submarine attacks during its voyage from China in the Take Ichi convoy. On 26 April 1944, almost all the men of one of the division's regiments were lost when their transport ship was sunk north west of Luzon. The convoy carrying the division put in at Manila between 29 April and 1 May where its destination was changed to Halmahera. Subsequently, the convoy carrying the 32nd Division was attacked by US submarines near the northeastern tip of Celebes on 6 May 1944. This and the previous attack reduced the division's strength to just five infantry battalions and one and a half artillery battalions. The surviving transports arrived at Halmahera on 9 May.

The division saw action against the United States Army during the Battle of Morotai from September 1944 until the end of the war. Two battalions of the 211th Infantry Regiment were sent to Morotai, which was only a short distance from Halmahera, to develop an airfield in May 1944, but these were withdrawn in July 1944 when the airfield was abandoned due to drainage problems. This left Morotai only lightly defended when a large Allied force landed there on 15 September 1944, and the Allies were able to quickly secure their objectives in the island's south west. Elements of the 32nd Division, including the 3rd Battalion of the 210th Infantry Regiment and the entire 211th Infantry Regiment, were transported to Morotai through a US Navy blockade between September and November 1944 in an attempt to attack the Allied base which was being developed on the island. The division was not able to launch this attack, however, as sufficient supplies could not be brought through the US blockade. As a result, the Japanese troops on Morotai retreated to the center of the island where many died from disease and starvation.

The 32nd Division continued to fight against the US forces on Morotai until the end of the war. In December 1944 the US 136th Infantry Regiment launched an offensive against the 211th Regiment's positions on Morotai. The US force assaulted the main Japanese positions on 3 January 1945, capturing them two days later. Following this the Americans pursued the remnants of the 211th Regiment until 14 January 1945, by which time they claimed to have killed 870 Japanese soldiers and captured ten for a loss of 46 killed and 127 wounded and injured. The US 93rd Infantry Division launched a further offensive against the Japanese on Morotai in April 1945 and captured the 211th Regiment's commander on 6 August. Following the end of the war, the remnants of the 32nd Division on Morotai and Halmahera surrendered to the 93rd Infantry Division on 26 August 1945.

== See also ==
- List of Japanese Infantry Divisions

== Notes ==
- This article incorporates material from the Japanese Wikipedia Page 第32師団 (日本軍), accessed 15 March 2016
