= 368th Infantry Regiment =

Infantry regiment of the USA

- Active: 25 October 1917–9 February 1919; 16 December 1940–3 February 1946 (Army of the United States)
- Country: United States
- Branch: United States Army
- Type: Infantry
- Size: Regiment
- Engagements: World War I; Meuse-Argonne campaign; Lorraine campaign; World War II; New Guinea campaign; Western New Guinea campaign; Admiralty Islands campaign; Battle of Morotai; Northern Solomons campaign; Operation Cartwheel; Bougainville campaign; Philippines campaign
- Decorations: Philippine Liberation Medal

The 368th Infantry Regiment was an infantry regiment of the United States Army that served during World War I in France and during World War II in the Pacific Theater.

== History ==
=== World War I ===
The 368th Infantry Regiment was activated on 25 October 1917 at Camp Meade, Maryland as part of the 92nd Division. Its commander was Colonel Frederick Brown. It was one of four regiments of the 92nd Division, all of which were composed of black enlisted personnel and junior officers, while the senior officers were white. During World War I the 368th was assigned to a French Army division due to segregation of the US Army it was not permitted to serve alongside white US units. As part of the French Army it participated in Lorraine and Meuse-Argonne campaigns. It served the greatest number of days in combat of any U.S. regiment. The regiment returned to the United States after the Armistice and was demobilized at Camp Meade in February and March 1919.

=== World War II ===
The 368th was reconstituted on 16 December 1940 and activated on 1 March 1941 at Fort Huachuca, Arizona. In January 1941 it was assigned to the 93rd Infantry Division. The division was sent overseas in 1944 and participated in the New Guinea, Northern Solomons and Southern Philippines campaigns. The regiment was deactivated on 3 February 1946 at Camp Stoneman, California. In 1950 the regiment was awarded the Philippine Presidential Unit Citation by the Philippine government.

=== Post World War II ===
On 20 October 1950, the regiment (at this time existing only "on paper") was broken up. The regiment was redesignated as the 80th Infantry Battalion, the 1st Battalion as the 522nd Infantry Battalion, the 2nd Battalion as the 523rd Infantry Battalion and the 3rd Battalion was disbanded.

The 80th Infantry Battalion (Separate) had a brief existence. It was activated on 16 November 1950 at Fort Bragg, North Carolina and was deactivated on 6 April 1951 at Fort Benning, Georgia. Presumably, its personnel were then transferred to reinforce other units.

The 522nd Infantry Battalion (Separate), successor to 1st Battalion, 368th Infantry, was activated on 3 November 1950 and attached to the 82nd Airborne Division at Fort Bragg, North Carolina. On 15 May 1951 the battalion was detached from the 82nd Airborne Division and relocated to Fort Sill, Oklahoma to support the United States Army Artillery Center. About this time, the unit was desegregated, in line with a change in policy which abolished racial segregation in the U.S. Army. The 522nd Infantry Battalion remained at Fort Sill until the late 1950s.

The 523rd Infantry Battalion (Separate) was never activated.
