= 37th Division (Imperial Japanese Army) =

- Active: 1939–1945
- Country: Empire of Japan
- Branch: Imperial Japanese Army
- Type: Infantry
- Role: garrison
- Garrison/HQ: Kumamoto, Japan
- Nickname: Winter Division
- Engagements: Second Sino-Japanese War

Commanders
- Notable commanders: Hatazō Adachi; Kentou Kenryou

The 37th Division (第37師団, Dai-sanjūnana Shidan) was an infantry division in the Imperial Japanese Army. Its call sign was the Winter Division (冬兵団, Fuyu Heidan). The 37th Division was activated at Kumamoto 7 February 1939 as a triangular division, simultaneously with 32nd, 33rd, 34th, 35th and 36th divisions. The division was declared battle-ready 2 July 1939. Its manpower came primarily from the prefectures on Kyūshū island.

== Action ==
Although intended as a garrison force to maintain public order and to cover police duties in Japanese-occupied portions of northern China, due to the deteriorating situation in the Second Sino-Japanese War it was quickly reassigned to front-line combat duties under control of the 1st army, especially against the Chinese communist Eighth Route Army in Shanxi Province.

The 37th Division was reassigned to the Japanese 12th Army on 31 March 1944 and was involved in Operation Ichi-go. It was transported by rail from Beijing to Hankou, entering Henan Province on 23 April 1944, occupying the city of Xuchang on 30 April 1944.

17 July 1944, the 37th division was assigned to 11th army and on 29 September 1944, it moved into Hunan province. By 24 November 1944, it had crossed into Guangxi province, where it occupied the provincial capital of Nanning.

On 10 December 1944, the 37th Division was ordered further south, into French Indochina, where it joined with the Japanese 21st Division and came under the overall command of the Japanese 38th Army. It was based in Nakhon Nayok Province in Thailand, north of Bangkok to counter the expected invasion of Thailand by British forces from Burma. It remained based in Thailand at the end of the war. During that period, the 37th mountain artillery regiment was detached and sent north, ending up with the 127th division.

The 37th Division survived World War II largely intact, and with a distinguished service record due to its discipline and strong leadership of its officer corps. Its former base at Nakhon Nayok Province was transformed into the Royal Thai Army Academy.

The troops of the 37th division have sailed from Bangkok 4–28 May 1946, to be landed in Sasebo, Nagasaki 19 May 1946 and Uraga, Kanagawa 18 June 1946. The division was dissolved shortly afterwards.

== See also ==
- List of Japanese Infantry Divisions

== Reference and further reading ==
- Madej, W. Victor. Japanese Armed Forces Order of Battle, 1937-1945 [2 vols]

Allentown, Pennsylvania: 1981

- This article incorporates material from the Japanese Wikipedia page 第37師団 (日本軍), accessed 18 March 2016
