= Roy Hoffman (United States Army officer) =

American military figure and judge

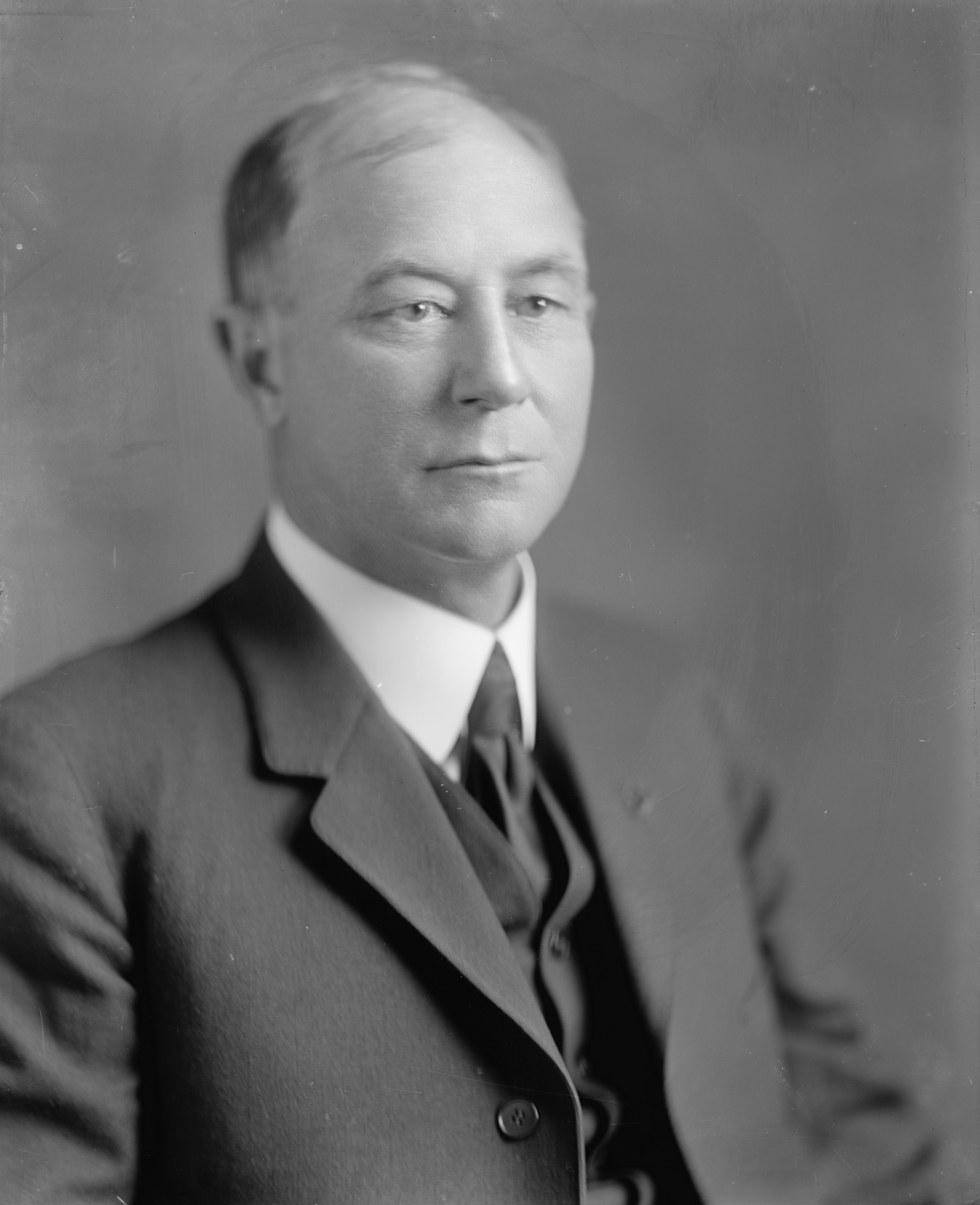
- Born: June 13, 1869; Neosho County, Kansas
- Died: June 18, 1953 (aged 84); Oklahoma City, Oklahoma
- Spouse: Estelle Conklin
- Children: 4
- Military career
- Allegiance: United States
- Branch: United States Army
- Service years: 189?–1933
- Rank: Major General
- Conflicts: Border War (1910–19); World War I
- Awards: Distinguished Service Medal; Legion of Honour; Order of the Crown (Belgium); Order of the Crown (Romania); Order of the Crown of Italy; Order of Glory (Tunisia)

Roy Hoffman (June 13, 1869 – June 18, 1953) was an attorney, judge, banker, newspaper man, and a United States Army officer in the early 20th century. He served in World War I, among other conflicts, and he received several awards for his service. He had a reputation as being a polymath, or "Renaissance Man."

== Biography ==
=== Early life and education ===
Hoffman was born in Neosho County, Kansas, on June 13, 1869. He attended Kansas State Normal School in Fort Scott, Kansas.

=== Civilian career ===
In 1889, Hoffman founded the Daily Leader in Guthrie, Oklahoma, the first daily newspaper in Oklahoma Territory. He worked as the private secretary of William Cary Renfrow when he was the governor of Oklahoma Territory. Admitted to the Oklahoma Bar Association in 1891, he served as an assistant United States Attorney for Oklahoma from 1903 to 1907, and as a judge for Oklahoma's 10th District from 1908 to 1912. He also served as a director of the First National Bank. He served in other roles, including as a cowboy, teacher, and Democratic Party committeeman. He had experience in so many different fields that he once stated on a newspaper questionnaire that he was involved in "nearly everything except train robbing."

Hoffman was involved in the American Legion, serving as a charter member, organizer, three-term national executive committee member, and as the national vice president of the American Legion Founders. He also was a civilian aide to the United States Secretary of War for eighteen years. He participated in several other organizations.

=== Military career ===
Hoffman joined the U.S. Army at the time of the Spanish–American War, and he was made a captain shortly after. He served as a colonel in the First Oklahoma Volunteer Infantry, and he served at the border with Mexico in that capacity. Hoffman was promoted to the rank of brigadier general on August 5, 1917, and he assumed command of Fort Sill. Hoffman then assumed command over the 61st Depot Brigade at Camp Bowie, and he helped organize the 36th Infantry Division. Starting on December 3, 1917, Hoffman organized and commanded the 93rd Infantry Division. He took the division to France and served on the front lines until the division was merged into the 1st Infantry Division. He received several awards for his service, including the Distinguished Service Medal, Legion of Honour, Order of the Crown of Belgium, Order of the Crown of Romania, Order of the Crown of Italy, and the Order of Glory of Tunisia. After he returned to the U.S., Hoffman commanded Camp Shelby and the 101st Division before being honorably discharged from the National Army in March 1919.

Hoffman was recommissioned as a brigadier general in the Officers Reserves Corps. He retired as a major general of the Oklahoma Army National Guard in 1933, commanding the 45th Infantry Division. He was called the "father" of the Oklahoma National Guard for his work in organizing and improving it.

=== Retirement and death ===
Hoffman lived in Oklahoma City as a retiree. He died on June 18, 1953.

== Personal life ==
Hoffman married Zoe Kennerly on August 3, 1890. They had one daughter, Lucille and divorced in 1895. Hoffman's second marriage was to Estelle Conklin on October 5, 1898. They had three children, Dorothy, Margaret and Roy Jr.
