= 35th Division (Imperial Japanese Army) =

- Active: 1939–1945
- Country: Japan
- Branch: Imperial Japanese Army
- Type: Infantry
- Nickname: East Division
- Engagements: Second Sino-Japanese War; Battle of Biak; Battle of Sansapor

The 35th Division (第35師団, Dai-sanjūgo Shidan) was an infantry division of the Imperial Japanese Army. The division was formed in 1939 and was disbanded in 1945. Its call sign was the East Division (東兵団, Higashi Heidan). The 35th Division was activated at Tokyo 7 February 1939, simultaneously with 32nd, 33rd, 34th, 36th and 37th divisions.

== History ==
The division was deployed to China in May 1939 to perform rear area security duties in the Second Sino-Japanese War. It initially operated in Shanxi and northern Henan. From some time in 1940 to March 1944 the 35th Division was stationed in the Kaifeng area of North China. The division was reorganised between 1 May 1943 from standard to garrison division, and this led to the artillery regiment and reconnaissance regiment being removed. The engineer and transport regiments were also downgraded to companies and the sanitation company was replaced by a field hospital. After reorganization, the division was assigned to the 12th army, and participated in the mop-up operations in the Taihang Mountains. In July 1943, it was reinforced by 54th infantry brigade from the 59th division.

The 35th Division was selected for service in western New Guinea in early April 1944. The 219th Regiment was detached to garrison the St. Andrew Strait and sailed from Yokohama on 6 April 1944. The divisional headquarters also sailed with the 219th Regiment, but was to trans-ship at Palau and continue to New Guinea. The remainder of the division left Shanghai on 17 April 1944 in the Take Ichi convoy. The convoy was attacked by United States Navy submarines on 26 April 1944 and 6 May 1944, and was diverted to Halmahera in the Netherlands East Indies to prevent further attacks. Transports carrying elements of the division were sunk during the 6 May 1944 attack, and only four of the division's six infantry battalions which embarked in the convoy and a single artillery battery remained at the end of the voyage.

The 35th Division was moved forward from Halmahera to Sorong in small ships during May 1944. The 219th regiment was also successfully transferred to New Guinea, though a battalion was left behind to garrison the St. Andrew Strait. Majority of 221st regiment was assigned to garrison Manokwari. Elements of the 35th Division subsequently fought in the Battle of Biak on 27 May 1944 (resulting in annihilation of Japanese garrison) and the Battle of Sansapor on 30 July 1944 on the Bird's Head Peninsula. As a result, the Japanese defenses at Manokwari were isolated as of September 1944. The Japanese forces retreated to a final defensive perimeter around Sorong in May 1945, where they remained until the surrender of Japan on 15 August 1945, thanks to abundant local supplies of Sago-derived foodstuffs.

== See also ==
- List of Japanese Infantry Divisions

== Notes ==
- This article incorporates material from Japanese Wikipedia page 第35師団 (日本軍), accessed 17 March 2016
