= Harry H. Johnson =

Military officer of the United States (1895–1986)

Harry Hubbard Johnson
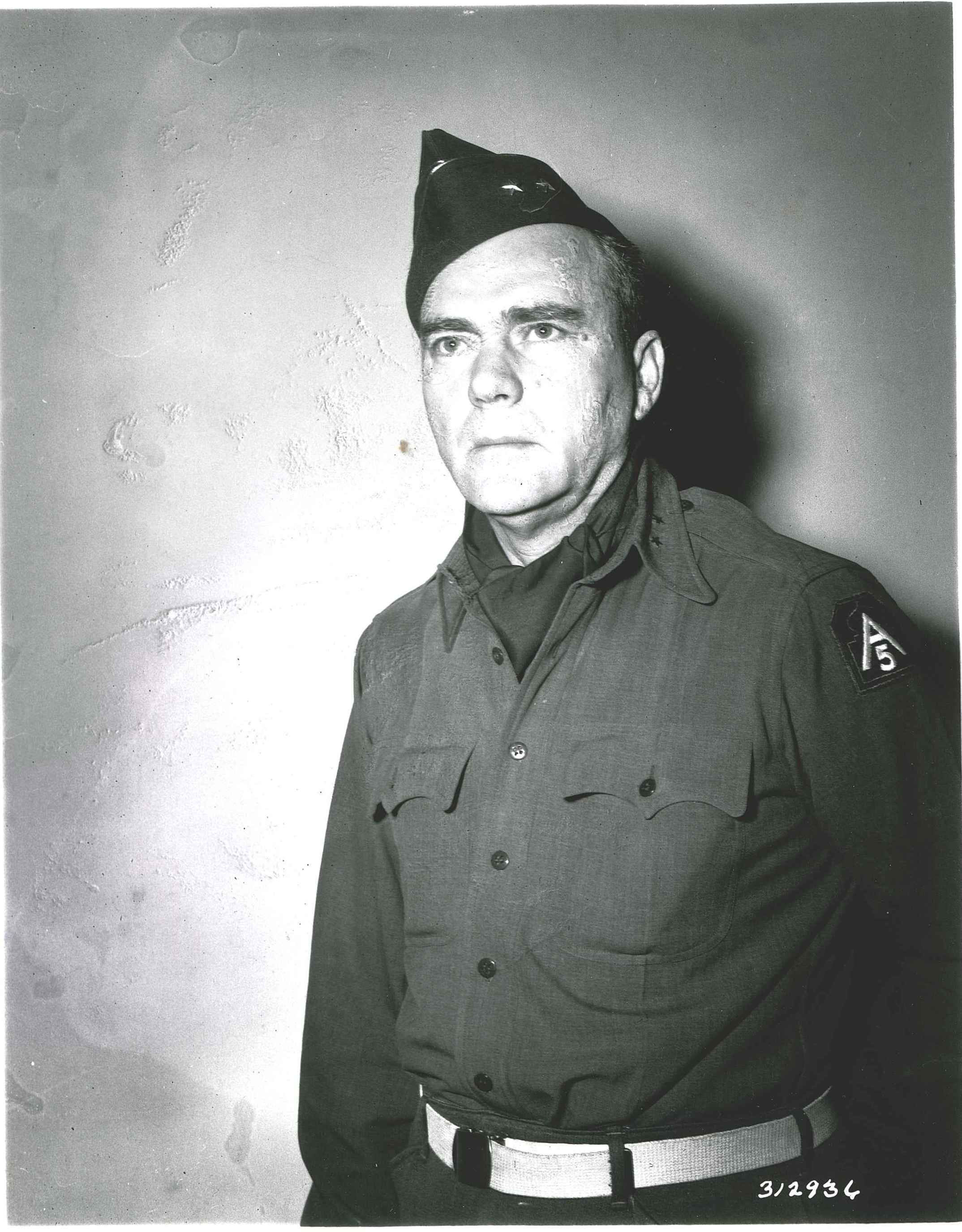
- Harry H. Johnson in the Wartime photo.
- Born: April 11, 1895; Glen Flora, Texas, U.S.
- Died: August 6, 1986 (aged 91); Kerrville, Texas, U.S.
- Burial place: Fort Sam Houston National Cemetery
- Military career
- Allegiance: United States of America
- Branch: United States Army
- Service years: 1917–1958
- Rank: Major general
- Service number: 0-172820
- Commands: 2nd Cavalry Division; 93rd Infantry Division
- Conflicts: World War I World War II
- Awards: Distinguished Service Medal; Hall of Honor

Harry Hubbard Johnson (April 11, 1895 – August 6, 1986) was a United States army officer with the rank of major general, who commanded 2nd Cavalry Division and 93rd Infantry Division during World War II. He was inducted to the Texas Military Hall of Honor in 1980.

== Early life ==
He was born in Glen Flora, Texas, six miles from his later hometown of Eagle Lake, Texas. He was the only son of Harry Stafford Johnson (September 17, 1873, Columbus, Texas – April 21, 1956, Eagle Lake, Texas) and Annie Bell Hubbard (Oct 14, 1873, Sealy, Texas – December 24, 1908, Eagle Lake, Texas).

His mother Annie died in 1908 when he was 13. His father later married Mamie Eggar (January 28, 1891, Corpus Christie, Texas – January 2, 1962, Runge, Texas) on January 28, 1912. They had three children: Robert Ellen Johnson (1913 – October, 1916), Frank Marshall Johnson (February 15, 1915 – January 31, 1976), and Richard Wayne Johnson (November 11, 1917 – November 1, 1919).

== World War I ==
He attended Texas A&M College to study agriculture, but transferred to Tyler Community College after 2 years. He later graduated from Tyler with a degree in accounting in May, 1916. He attended the Officer Training Course at Leon Springs, Texas in May, 1917, a month after the American entry into World War I, and was assigned to the Aviation Ground School in Austin, Texas. When the call went out for recruits to fight in Europe, Johnson dropped out of flight school and enlisted in the Texas National Guard on August 10, 1917.

Johnson was sent to Camp Bowie in Fort Worth, Texas, on August 23, 1917, where he was made a Sergeant on September 7, 1917, with Company E, 141st Infantry, 36th Division. He was promoted to Second Lieutenant on December 2, 1917, and commissioned on December 28, 1917. He was transferred to Camp Bullis and was promoted to First Lieutenant on June 11, 1918.

Johnson traveled with the officers of Company E, 141st Infantry Regiment on the USS Finland, embarking on July 26, 1918, from Hoboken, New Jersey. Arriving in France on August 6, the 141st was assigned to the 13th Training area near Bar sur Aube. After moving into support positions in September, it was assigned to prepare to relieve the 2d U. S. Division in the Épernay-Chalons region. With the 142d Regiment, they took over the positions of the 9th and 23d U. S. Infantry regiments.

On October 8, 1918, the regiment began participation in one of the great chapters in its combat history, the Meuse-Argonne campaign. On that day, along a line extending four kilometers east to west, the 141st and 142d regiments attacked German positions, resulting in a "substantial gain of ground" but suffering casualties to sixty-six officers and 1,227 enlisted men. After being relieved by the 72d Brigade (143rd and 144 Inf), the unit side-stepped to take a place at the east end of the line of the 72d Brigade several days later. On October 27, the unit took part in the assault on "Foret (Forest) Farm", and then was relieved on October 28, taking no further combat action in the war. The unit returned to the United States after six additional months in France and was mustered out July 3, 1919.

Johnson left France as part of Company K, 26th Infantry, on August 23, 1919, on board the transport USS Marcia (incorrectly written as USS Marica on embarcation records) and arrived at Brooklyn, New York, on September 2, 1919. The 26th Infantry was sent to Camp Merritt upon disembarkation. He was honorably discharged on October 16, 1919, but failed to get a commission in the Officer's Reserve Corps.

== Interwar years ==
On August 9, 1920, he was commissioned in the Texas National Guard as a first lieutenant in the 3rd Texas Cavalry. He also had a job as a commissary foreman for the Gulf Production company. In January 1921 he was promoted to captain in the 56th Cavalry Brigade, Texas National Guard, and worked as an oil salesman for Gulf. He also enlisted as a Texas special ranger in 1930 for one year see https://tslarc.tsl.texas.gov/service/SR/j/jo/joh10852.pdf

From 1929 to 1940 he served with the 124th Cavalry Regiment. In October 1941 he was given command of the 112th Cavalry Regiment.

== World War II ==
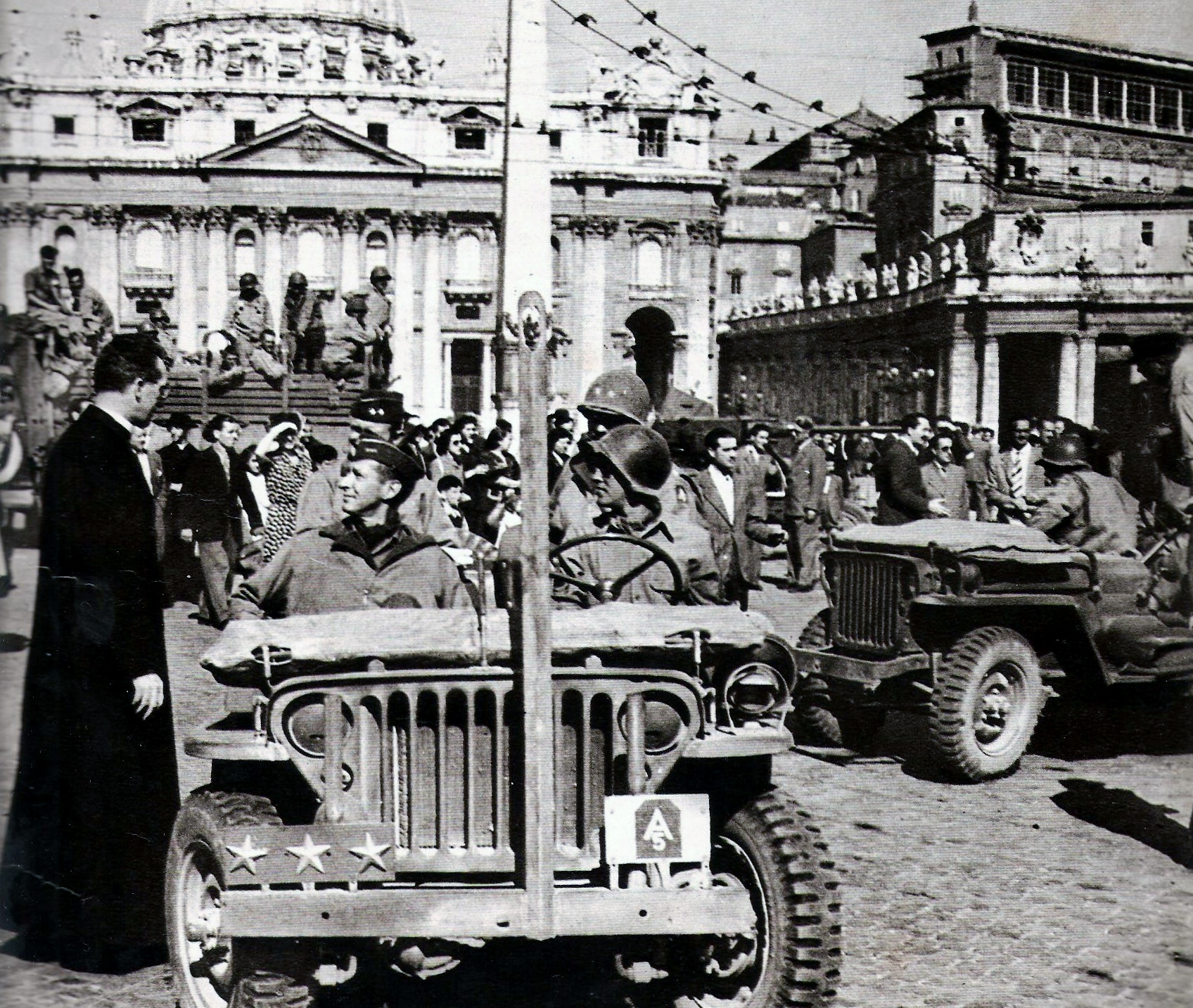
Lieutenant General Mark W. Clark riding in a jeep through the recently liberated Italian capital of Rome, June 1944. Sat behind Clark is Major General Alfred Gruenther while to Gruenther's left is Major General Harry H. Johnson.

In 1941–1942 he commanded the 7th and 8th Cavalry Regiments, 2nd Cavalry Brigade, 1st Cavalry Division. In 1942–1943 he commanded the 56th Cavalry Brigade. In 1943 he was promoted to brigadier general. In 1944 he was promoted to major general and made commander of the all-black 2nd Cavalry Division, which was dismounted and performed various service and support functions in the North African Campaign from February, 1943 to May, 1944. On June 5, 1944, he was appointed by President Roosevelt as the military governor of Rome. From August 1944 to September 1945 he was made commander of the all-black 93rd Infantry Division which performed service and support tasks in the New Guinea-Philippines Campaign.

== Postwar career ==
Johnson worked as an executive for the Gulf Oil Company after the war while remaining in the Army Reserve.

He served as director of the Hoof and Mouth Commission in the Republic of Mexico from c. 1946 to c. 1951. The joint Mexico-U.S. commission produced 5,500,000 doses of vaccine and vaccinated over 3,500,000 animals in August, 1949.

Johnson retired from the Army Reserve in 1958.

Harry H. Johnson died on August 6, 1986, in Kerrville, Texas. He was buried on August 11, 1986, in Fort Sam Houston National Cemetery, San Antonio, Texas.

== Family ==
Johnson married Rose Mathilda "Mimi" Morisseau (1894–1977) in Fort Worth, Texas, on June 5, 1923. They had four children: Rosemary Virginia (1925–1997), Harry Hubbard Jr. (1927–1981), Jacob Pyron (1931–2006), Richard Stafford (1933–1999).

Military offices
Preceded by Newly activated organization	Commanding General 2nd Cavalry Division; 1942–1943	Succeeded by Post deactivated
Preceded by Raymond G. Lehman	Commanding General 93rd Infantry Division; 1944–1945	Succeeded by Leonard R. Boyd
