= 34th Division (Imperial Japanese Army) =

- Active: 1939–1945
- Country: Empire of Japan
- Branch: Imperial Japanese Army
- Type: Infantry
- Role: garrison
- Garrison/HQ: Osaka, Japan
- Nickname(s): Camellia Division
- Engagements: Second Sino-Japanese War

Commanders
- Notable commanders: Hata Hikosaburo

The 34th Division (第34師団, Dai-sanjūyon Shidan) was an infantry division in the Imperial Japanese Army. Its call sign was the Camellia Division (椿兵団, Tsubaki Heidan). The Japanese Imperial Army 34th Division was raised as a triangular division on 2 July 1939 in Osaka, simultaneously with 32nd, 33rd, 35th, 36th and 37th divisions. Its manpower came primarily from Osaka and Wakayama prefecture. It was intended as a garrison force to maintain public order and to cover police duties in Japanese-occupied portions of central China,

== Action ==
The 34th division have left Osaka 3 April 1939 and arrived to Hankou 13 April 1939. Initially the 34th division was assigned to the Wuhan area under control of the Japanese 11th Army. In December 1939, it was transferred to Nanchang, the capital of Jiangxi province, where it served as a garrison force. In 1940, it participated in the Battle of Zaoyang-Yichang. In March 1941, it participated in the Battle of Shanggao (part of Battle of Changsha (1941)), and from 24 December 1941 participated in Battle of Changsha (1942).

From 1 May to 1 July 1943, the division was reorganized and stripped of the majority of the transportation means.

Along with the rest of the 11th army, it was assigned 18 April 1944 under direct control of the China Expeditionary Army to participate in the Operation Ichi-Go, but as more of a reserve and garrison unit to consolidate and control territorial gains made during that operation, rather than as a front-line combat division. The 34th division had garrisoned Changsha and Yuelu Mountain pass during the battle, having combat starting from 29 April 1944. As part of the 20th Army it was involved in the Battle of West Hunan from April 1945. It meet the surrender of Japan 15 August 1945 outside of Jiujiang, on the southern shores of the Yangtze River in northwest Jiangxi Province, while retreating to Nanjing.

16 September 1945, the division gathered in Pukou District of Nanjing. The railway transfer to Shanghai has started 15 January 1946, and was complete 30 January 1946. The demobilization have started 31 January 1946, while the exact dissolution date of 34th division is unknown.

== See also ==
- List of Japanese Infantry Divisions

== Reference and further reading ==
- Madej, W. Victor. Japanese Armed Forces Order of Battle, 1937-1945 [2 vols] Allentown, PA: 1981
- This article incorporates material from the Japanese Wikipedia page 第34師団 (日本軍), accessed 16 March 2016
