= 36th Division (Imperial Japanese Army) =

- Active: 1939–1945
- Country: Japan
- Branch: Imperial Japanese Army
- Type: Infantry
- Nickname(s): Snow Division
- Engagements: Second Sino-Japanese War; Battle of Biak; Western New Guinea campaign

The 36th Division (第36師団, Dai-sanjūroku Shidan) was an infantry division of the Imperial Japanese Army. The division was formed in 1939 and was disbanded in 1945. Its call sign was the Snow Division (雪兵団, Yuki Heidan). The 36th Division was activated at Hirosaki 7 February 1939, simultaneously with 32nd, 33rd, 34th, 35th and 37th divisions.

== Action ==
The 36th Division was initially assigned to the 1st Army garrison duty in North China. The division was assigned to the 2nd Army, ordered to move south in October 1943 and reformed to seaborne division on 5 November, with infantry regiments absorbing artillery and engineering units. Soon the 36th Division departed Shanghai, briefly stopped at Halmahera and finally landed in Sarmi on New Guinea. The majority of the 222nd infantry regiment was sent to Biak (forming the Biak Detachment) where it was annihilated in the Battle of Biak by 17 August 1944. On New Guinea, the US forces landed in Aitape 22 April and in Sarmi on 17 May, squeezing the 36th Division to the coastal strip south of Biak. From June 1944, the fighting on New Guinea had downgraded to sporadic skirmishes, and the rest of the 36th Division survived until the surrender of Japan on 15 August 1945 nearly unscathed, coping mostly with the problem of starvation.

== See also ==
- List of Japanese Infantry Divisions
