= Battle of Morotai =

1944 World War II battle

- Part of the Western New Guinea campaign, World War II
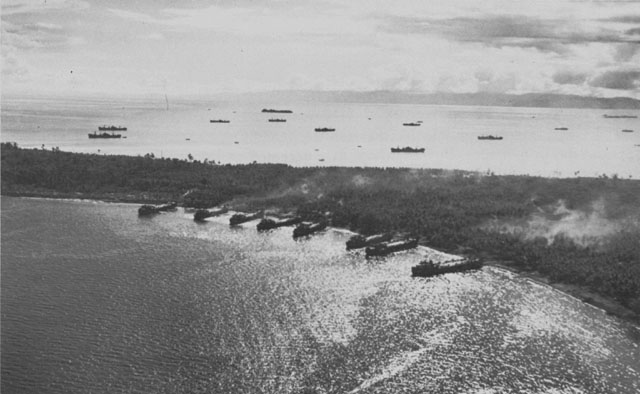
- LSTs landing supplies at Blue Beach, Morotai
Date	15 September – 4 October 1944 (initial period), intermittent fighting continued until the end of the war
Location	Morotai, off North Halmahera, Maluku Islands ID-MU 02°01′52″N 128°17′26″E
Result	Allied victory

Belligerents
United States; Australia; United Kingdom; Netherlands	Japan

Commanders and leaders
(United States) John C. Persons (land until September 23); (United States) Clarence A. Martin (land); (United States) Daniel E. Barbey (naval)	(Empire of Japan) Takenobu Kawashima (initial commander); Kisou Ouchi (POW) (from 12 October)

Strength
57,020 (initial force)	~500 at the time of the Allied invasion, later reinforced

Casualties and losses
30 dead; 85 wounded; 1 missing; (initial invasion period)	300+ dead; 13 captured; (initial invasion period)

The Battle of Morotai, part of the Pacific War, began on 15 September 1944, and continued until the end of the war in August 1945. The fighting started when United States and Australian forces landed on the southwest corner of Morotai, a small island in the Netherlands East Indies (NEI), which the Allies needed as a base to support the liberation of the Philippines later that year. The invading forces greatly outnumbered the island's Japanese defenders and secured their objectives in two weeks. Japanese reinforcements landed on the island between September and November, but lacked the supplies needed to effectively attack the Allied defensive perimeter. Intermittent fighting continued until the end of the war, with the Japanese troops suffering heavy loss of life from disease and starvation.

Morotai's development into an Allied base began shortly after the landing, and two major airfields were ready for use in October. These and other base facilities played an important role in the Liberation of the Philippines during 1944 and 1945. Torpedo boats and aircraft based at Morotai also harassed Japanese positions in the NEI. The island's base facilities were further expanded in 1945 to support the Australian-led Borneo Campaign, and Morotai remained an important logistical hub and command center until the Dutch reestablished their colonial rule in the NEI.

== Background ==
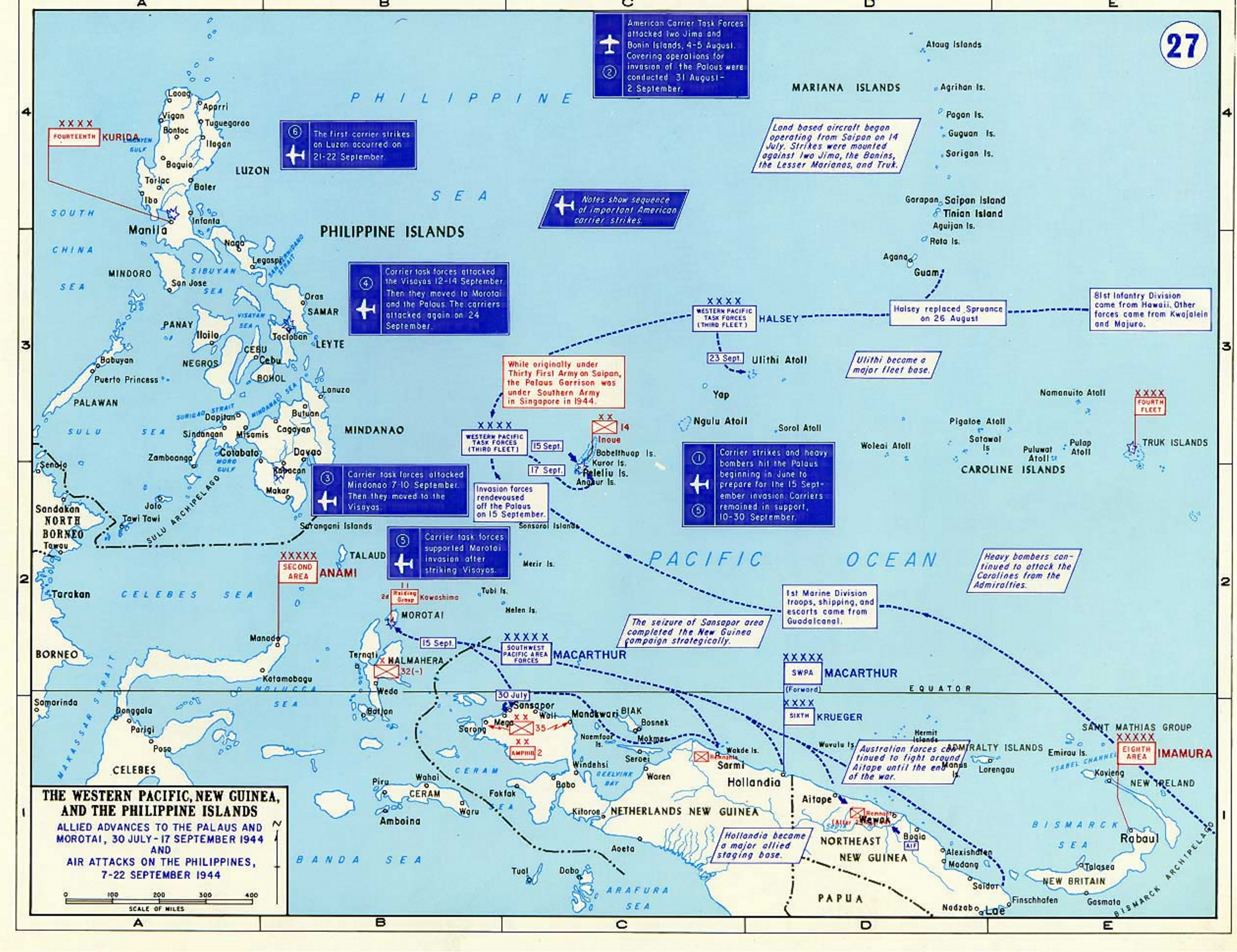
Allied operations and major Japanese garrisons in the Western Pacific between July and September 1944

Morotai is a small island located in the Halmahera group of eastern Indonesia's Maluku Islands. Most of the island's interior is rugged and covered in thick jungle. The Doroeba Plain in Morotai's south-west corner is the largest of the island's few lowland areas. Prior to the outbreak of war, Morotai had a population of 9,000 and had not been commercially developed. It formed part of the Netherlands East Indies and was ruled by the Dutch through the Sultanate of Ternate. The Japanese occupied Morotai in early 1942 during the Netherlands East Indies campaign but did not garrison or develop it.

In early 1944, Morotai became an area of importance to the Japanese military when it started developing the neighbouring larger island of Halmahera as a focal point for the defence of the southern approaches to the Philippines. In May 1944, the Imperial Japanese Army's 32nd Division arrived at Halmahera to defend the island and its nine airstrips. The division had suffered heavy losses when the Take Ichi convoy transporting it from China was attacked by American submarines. Two battalions from the 32nd Division's 211th Infantry Regiment were sent to Morotai to develop an airstrip on the Doroeba Plain. Both battalions were withdrawn to Halmahera in mid-July and the airstrip was abandoned because of drainage problems. Allied code breakers detected the Japanese buildup at Halmahera and Morotai's weak defenses, and passed this information on to the relevant planning staff.

In July 1944, General Douglas MacArthur, the commander of the South West Pacific Area, selected Morotai as the location for air bases and naval facilities needed to support the liberation of Mindanao in the Philippines. At the time this landing in the Philippines was planned for 15 November. While Morotai was undeveloped, it was preferred over Halmahera, as the larger and much better-defended island was judged too difficult to capture and secure. The occupation of Morotai was designated Operation Tradewind. The landing was scheduled to take place on 15 September 1944, the same day as the 1st Marine Division's landing at Peleliu. This schedule allowed the main body of the United States Pacific Fleet to simultaneously protect both operations from potential Japanese counter-attacks.

As little opposition was expected at Morotai, Allied planners decided to land the invasion force close to the airfield sites on the Doroeba Plain. Two beaches on the south-west coast of the island were selected as suitable landing sites and were designated Red Beach and White Beach. The Allied plan called for all three infantry regiments of the 31st Division to be landed across these beaches on 15 September and swiftly drive inland to secure the plain. As Morotai's interior had no military value, the Allies did not intend to advance beyond a perimeter needed to defend the airfields. Planning for the construction of airfields and other base installations was also conducted prior to the landing, and tentative locations for these facilities had been selected by 15 September.

== Prelude ==
=== Opposing forces ===
At the time of the Allied landings, Morotai was defended by approximately 500 Japanese soldiers. The main unit was the 2nd Provisional Raiding Unit, which had gradually arrived on the island between 12 and 19 July 1944, to replace the 32nd Division's battalions when they were withdrawn. The 2nd Provisional Raiding Unit comprised four companies and was manned by Japanese officers and Formosan soldiers. Small elements of several other infantry, military police and support units were also present on the island. The 2nd Provisional Raiding Unit's commander, Major Takenobu Kawashima, deployed the unit in the south-west sector of the island and used the smaller units to establish lookout posts and detachments around Morotai's coastline. The largest of these outposts was on the island's north-east end at Cape Sopi, which consisted of about 100 men. The Japanese force was too small and widely dispersed to be able to mount an effective defense, so the 32nd Division ordered it to build dummy camps and use other deceptions in an attempt to trick the Allies into thinking that Morotai was strongly held.

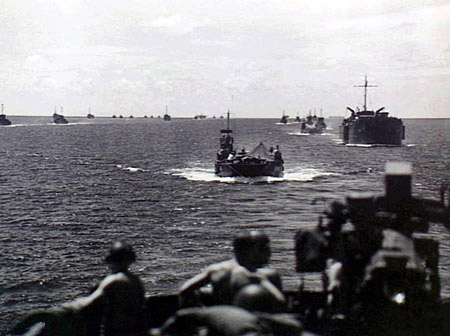
A long line of Allied landing craft and transports approaching Morotai

The Allied force assigned to Morotai outnumbered the island's defenders by more than one hundred to one. The Tradewind Task Force was established on 20 August under the command of Major General Charles P. Hall and numbered 40,105 U.S. Army soldiers and 16,915 United States Army Air Forces (USAAF) and Royal Australian Air Force (RAAF) personnel. The Tradewind Task Force came under the overall command of the United States Sixth Army; its main combat elements were the XI Corps headquarters, the 31st Infantry Division and the 126th Regimental Combat Team (RCT) from the 32nd Infantry Division. These units were supported by engineers and a large anti-aircraft group. The Tradewind Task Force also included large numbers of construction and other line of communications units whose role was to swiftly develop the island into a major base. The 6th Infantry Division was designated the force reserve but remained on the mainland of New Guinea. MacArthur accompanied the force on board USS Nashville but was not in direct command of the operation.

The landing force was supported by powerful air and naval forces. The United States Fifth Air Force provided direct support while the Thirteenth Air Force and No. 10 Operational Group RAAF conducted strategic missions in the NEI and Philippines. The naval force was designated Task Force 77 and was organised into two attack groups, four reinforcement groups, a support group and an escort carrier group. The attack and reinforcement groups were responsible for transporting the assault force and subsequent support units and comprised twenty-four destroyers, four frigates, two Australian LSIs, five APDs, one LSD, twenty-four LCIs, forty-five LSTs, twenty LCTs and eleven LCIs armed with rockets. The support group was made up of two Australian heavy cruisers, three US light cruisers and eight US and two Australian destroyers. The escort carrier group comprised six escort carriers and ten destroyer escorts and provided anti-submarine and combat air patrol. Task Force 38.4 with two fleet carriers, two light aircraft carriers, one heavy cruiser, one light cruiser and thirteen destroyers was also available to support Task Force 77 if required.

=== Preliminary attacks ===
Preliminary air attacks to suppress the Japanese air forces in the vicinity of Morotai began in August 1944. At this time, the Allied intelligence services estimated that there were 582 Japanese aircraft within 400 miles (640 km) of Morotai, 400 of which were in the objective area. The Allied air forces conducted heavy raids on airfields in the Halmaheras, Celebes, Ceram, Ambon, Boeroe and other areas. US Navy carrier-borne aircraft also attacked Japanese air units based at Mindanao and mounted further attacks on Halmahera and Celebes. These attacks were successful, and by 14 September it was estimated that only 60 aircraft remained in the vicinity of Morotai.

To preserve surprise, the Allies did not bombard Morotai prior to the invasion and conducted only a few photographic reconnaissance flights over the island. An Allied Intelligence Bureau patrol had been landed in the island in June but the information it collected was not passed on to the Sixth Army. Although the Tradewind Task Force had little information on the invasion beaches or Japanese positions, the Sixth Army did not land any of its reconnaissance patrols on Morotai, as it was feared that these could warn the island's defenders that an attack was imminent.

The Tradewind Task Force embarked onto the invasion convoy at several bases in north-west New Guinea, and conducted landing rehearsals at Aitape and Wakde Island in early September. The convoy gathered at Maffin Bay on 11 September and set out for Morotai the next day. Its voyage was uneventful, and the convoy arrived off Morotai on the morning of 15 September without having been detected by Japanese forces.

== Allied landings ==
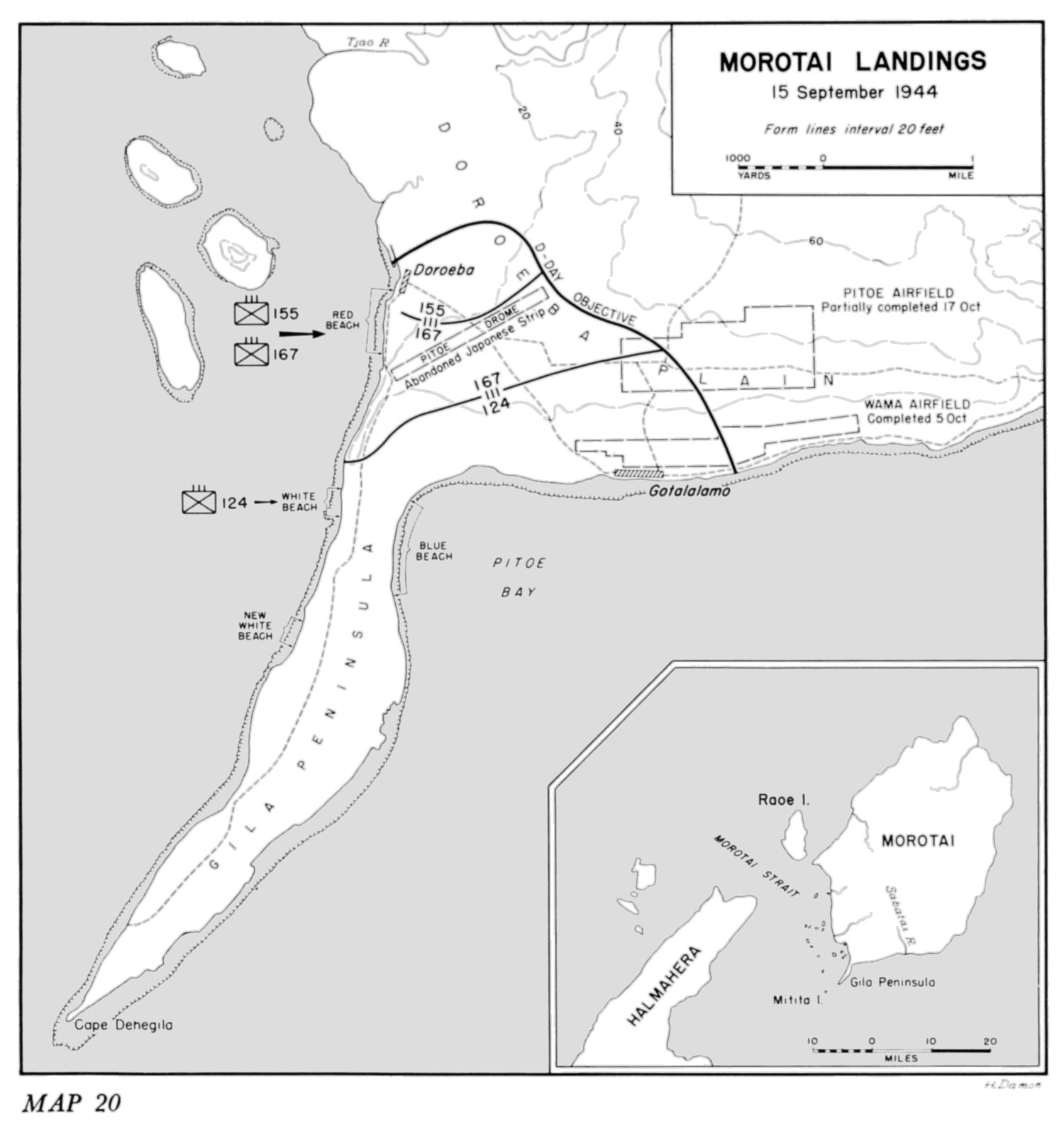
Locations of the Allied landings on 15 September 1944

The battle of Morotai began at 6:30 on the morning of 15 September. Allied warships conducted a two-hour-long bombardment of the landing area to suppress any Japanese forces there. This bombardment set several villages on fire, but caused few Japanese casualties as they did not have many troops in the area.

The first wave of American troops landed on Morotai at 8:30 and did not encounter any opposition. The 155th and 167th RCTs landed at Red Beach and the 124th RCT at White Beach. Once ashore, the assault troops assembled into their tactical units and rapidly advanced inland. By the end of the day the 31st Division had secured all of its D-Day objectives and held a perimeter 2,000 yards (1,800 m) inland. There was little fighting and casualties were very low on both sides. The Japanese 2nd Provisional Raiding Unit was unable to offer any resistance to the overwhelming Allied force, and withdrew inland in good order. Japanese 7th Air Division aircraft based at Ceram and Celebes began a series of nightly air raids on Morotai on 15 September, but these had little effect on the Allied force.

The lack of resistance was fortunate for the Allies due to unexpectedly poor beach conditions. While the limited pre-invasion intelligence suggested that Red and White beaches were capable of supporting an amphibious landing, they were in fact highly unsuitable for this purpose. Both beaches were muddy and difficult for landing craft to approach owing to rocky ridges and coral reefs. As a result, soldiers and equipment had to be landed through deep surf. This delayed the operation and caused a large quantity of equipment to be damaged. Like many of his soldiers, MacArthur was forced to wade through chest-high surf when he came ashore. On the morning of D-Day a survey party determined that a beach on the south coast of Morotai was much better suited to LSTs. This beach, which was designated Blue Beach, became the primary Allied landing point from 16 September.

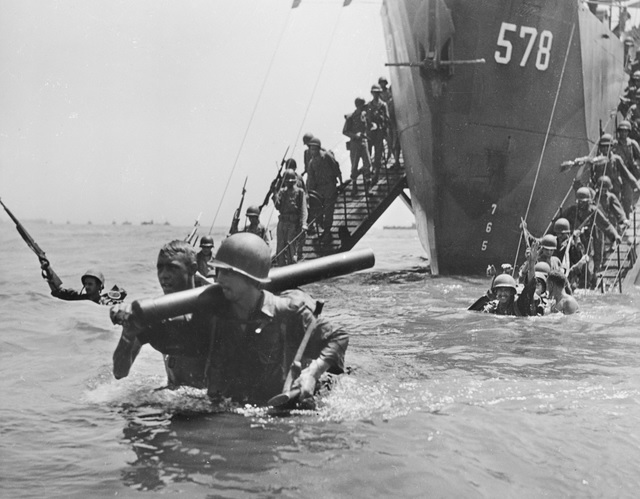
Infantrymen disembark into deep water on 15 September.

The 31st Division continued its advance inland on 16 September. The division met little opposition and secured the planned perimeter line around the airfield area that afternoon. From 17 September, the 126th Infantry Regiment landed at several points on Morotai's coastline and offshore islands to establish radar stations and observation posts. These operations were generally unopposed, though patrols landed in northern Morotai made numerous contacts with small Japanese parties. The 2nd Provisional Raiding Unit attempted to infiltrate the Allied positions on the night of 18 September but was not successful.

A detachment from the Netherlands Indies Civil Administration (NICA) was responsible for civil affairs on Morotai. This detachment came ashore on 15 September, and reestablished Dutch sovereignty over Morotai's civilian population. Many local civilians subsequently provided NICA with intelligence on Japanese dispositions on Morotai and Halmahera and others acted as guides for American patrols.

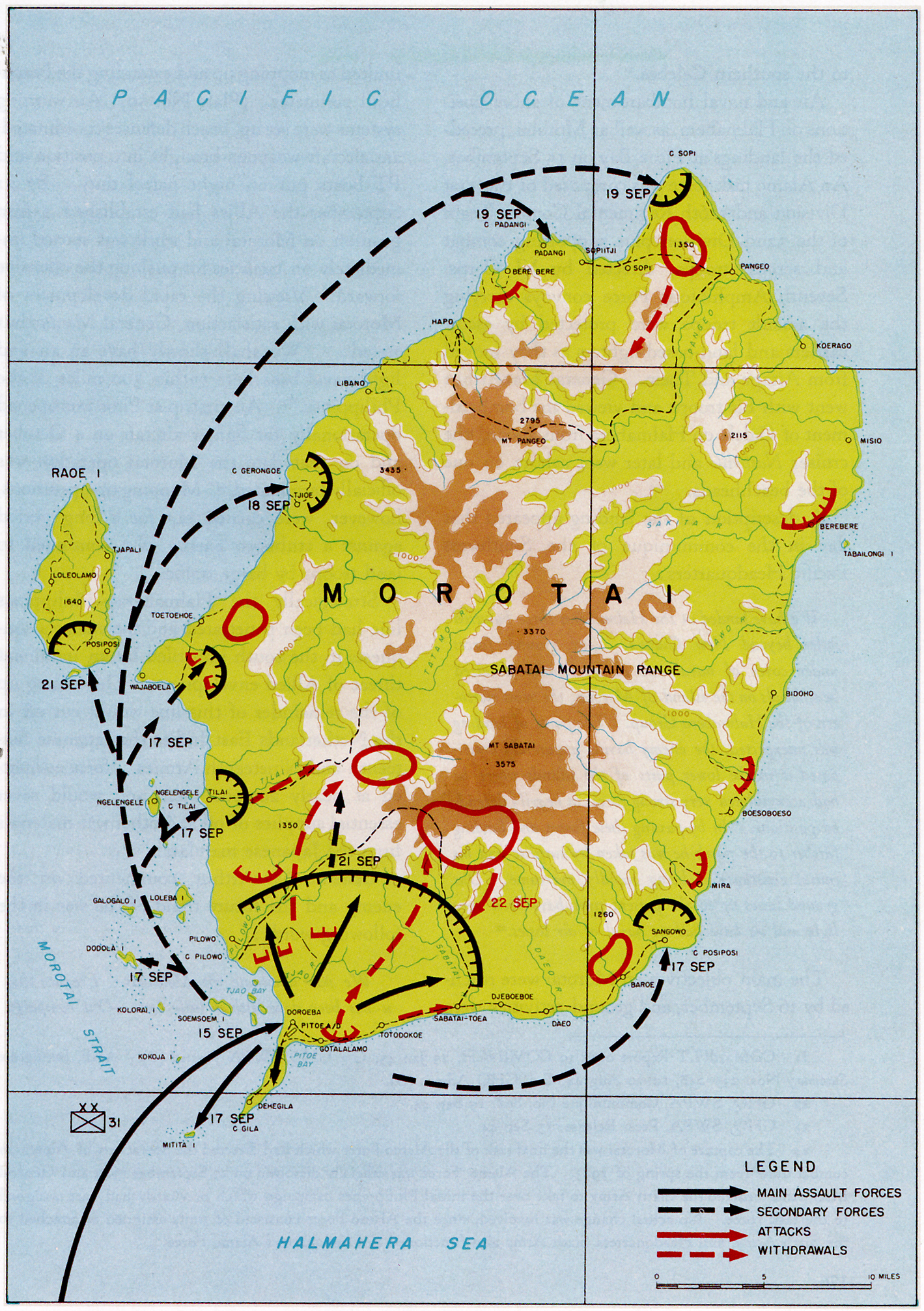
The movements of Allied and Japanese forces during the first weeks of the battle

On 20 September, the 31st Division advanced further inland to secure an expanded perimeter. This was necessary to provide room for additional bivouacs and supply installations after General MacArthur's headquarters decided to expand airfield construction on the island. The advance met little resistance and was completed in one day. On 22 September, a Japanese force attacked the headquarters of the 1st Battalion, 167th Infantry Regiment but was easily repulsed. The following day, a company from the 126th Infantry Regiment unsuccessfully attacked a fortified Japanese unit near Wajaboeta on the island's west coast. The 126th resumed its attack on 24 September and secured the position. US forces continued intensive patrolling until 4 October when the island was declared secure. U.S. casualties during the initial occupation of Morotai numbered 30 dead, 85 wounded, and one missing. Japanese casualties were much higher, numbering over 300 dead and 13 captured.

The American ground troops did not require the heavy air support available to them, and the fast carrier group was released for other duties on 17 September. The six escort carriers remained in support, but their aircraft saw little action. Four of the CVEs were released on 25 September, and the remaining two departed on 4 October. The destroyer escort USS Shelton was sunk by Japanese submarine Ro-41 on 3 October while escorting the CVE group. Several hours later a TBF Avenger from the escort carrier USS Midway attacked USS Seawolf 20 miles (32 km) north of where Shelton had been torpedoed, in the mistaken belief that she was the submarine responsible. After dropping two bombs, the TBF Avenger guided USS Richard M. Rowell to the area and the destroyer escort sank Seawolf after five attempts, killing all the submarine's crew. It was later determined that while Seawolf was traveling in a designated "submarine safety lane", the CVE pilots had not been properly briefed on the lane's existence and location, and that the submarine's position had not been provided to USS Richard M. Rowell.

The U.S. Navy established a PT boat base at Morotai on 16 September when the tenders USS Mobjack and USS Oyster Bay arrived with motor torpedo boat squadrons 9, 10, 18 and 33 and their 41 boats. The PT boats' primary mission was to prevent the Japanese from moving troops from Halmahera to Morotai by establishing a blockade of the 12-mile (19 km)-wide strait between the two islands.

Elements of the 31st Division embarked from Morotai in November to capture several islands off New Guinea from which Japanese outposts could observe Allied movements. On 15 November 1,200 troops from the 2nd Battalion, 167th Infantry Regiment and attached units were landed at Pegun Island in the Mapia islands; the next day, Bras Island was attacked. The Mapia Islands were declared secure on 18 November after resistance from 172 Japanese troops of the 36th Infantry Division was overcome. On 19 November, a force of 400 US troops built around F Company, 124th Infantry Regiment occupied the undefended Asia Islands. These were the first offensive operations overseen by the Eighth United States Army, and the naval commander for both operations was Captain Lord Ashbourne of the Royal Navy on board HMS Ariadne. Radar and LORAN stations were subsequently established on the islands.

== Base development ==
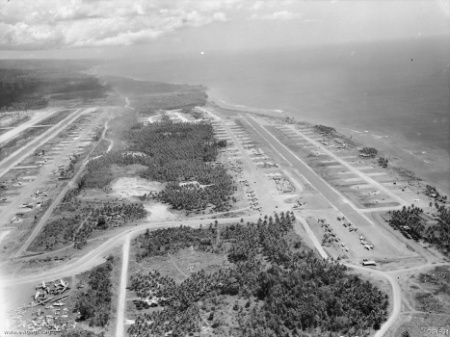
Wama Drome in April 1945

The rapid development of Morotai into a major military base, Naval Base Morotai, was a key goal of the operation. Pre-invasion plans called for the construction of three large airstrips within forty-five days of 15 September, with the first to be operational immediately after the landing. The plans also included accommodation and supply facilities for 60,000 air force and army personnel, a 1,900-bed hospital, bulk fuel storage and handling installations and ship docking facilities. To construct these facilities, the Tradewind Task Force included 7,000 engineer service troops, of whom 84 percent were American and the remainder Australian.

Work began on base facilities before Morotai was secured. Survey parties began transit surveys of the airfield sites on 16 September, which determined that their planned alignment was unworkable. Plans to complete the Japanese airfield were also abandoned, as it would have interfered with larger airfields to be built to the east. It was instead cleared and used as an emergency "crash strip". Work on the first new airstrip (called Wama Drome) began on 23 September after the site was cleared. By 4 October Wama Drome's runway was operable for 5,000 feet (1,500 m) and was supporting heavy bomber raids on Balikpapan in Borneo. Construction of the even larger Pitu Drome, which was to have two runways parallel to Wama Drome, began in late September and by 17 October it had a usable 7,000-foot (2,100 m) runway. Construction work was accelerated from 18 October after the United States Third Fleet was withdrawn from providing direct support to the planned landing at Leyte. When the two airstrips were completed in November they boasted three large runways and hardstandings for 253 aircraft, including 174 heavy bombers. Although the air base construction required the destruction of villages, the American and Australian airfield engineers were assisted from 1 October by about 350 laborers locally recruited by the NICA detachment.

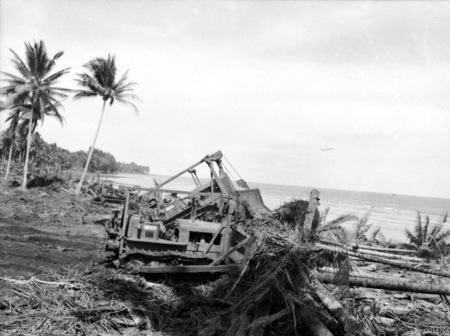
Royal Australian Air Force bulldozers knocking down trees to clear land for an airstrip on Morotai

Other base facilities were erected concurrently with the construction of the airstrips. Work on fuel storage facilities began shortly after the landing, and the first was ready on 20 September. A jetty for oil tankers and a larger tank farm were completed in early October, and storage facilities continued to be expanded until November, when capacity for 129,000 barrels (20,500 m^{3}) of fuel was available. Several docks capable of accommodating liberty ships were constructed on Morotai's west coast, and the first was completed on 8 October. In addition, twenty LST landings were constructed on Blue Beach to facilitate the loading and unloading of these ships. Other major construction projects included an extensive road network, a naval installation, 28,000 square feet (2,600 m^{2}) of warehousing, and clearing land for supply dumps and bivouacs. A 1,000-bed hospital was also built after the original plans for a 1,900-bed facility were revised. The main difficulties encountered were overcoming the mud caused by unusually heavy rains and finding sufficient water supplies.

A revision to Allied plans meant that Morotai played a much greater role in the liberation of the Philippines than had been originally envisioned. The invasion of Mindanao was postponed in September 1944 in favour of a landing at Leyte in the central Philippines in late October. The air bases at Morotai were the closest Allied air strips to Leyte, and fighters and bombers based on the island attacked targets in the southern Philippines and NEI in support of the landing at Leyte on 25 October. After airfields were completed at Leyte, Morotai was also used as a staging point for fighters and bombers traveling to the Philippines.

== Subsequent fighting ==
=== Japanese response ===
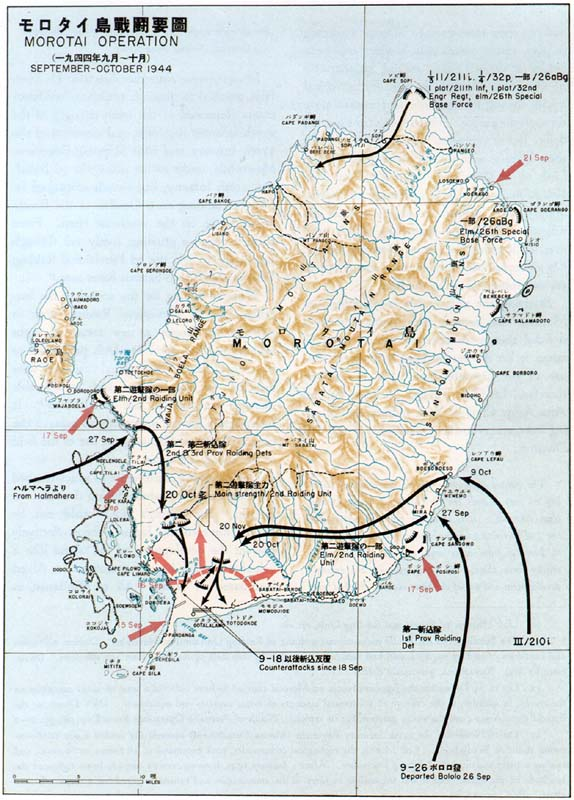
Locations of Japanese reinforcement landings

The Japanese military recognized that its forces in the Philippines would be threatened if the Allies developed airfields on Morotai. In an attempt to disrupt the airfield construction program, the Japanese Army commanders on Halmahera sent large numbers of reinforcements to Morotai between late September and November. These troops included the main body of the 211th Infantry Regiment, the 3rd Battalion of the 210th Infantry Regiment and three raiding detachments. The commander of the 211th Infantry Regiment, Colonel Kisou Ouchi, assumed command of the Japanese forces on Morotai on 12 October. Allied codebreakers were often able to warn the forces at Morotai of attempts to run the blockade, and PT boats destroyed a large number of the barges the Japanese used to transport troops from Halmahera. The Allies were, however, unable to completely stop the Japanese buildup.

The Japanese counter-offensive on Morotai was not successful. The troops brought to the island suffered from high rates of disease and it proved impossible to bring sufficient supplies through the Allied air and naval blockade. As a result, while the 2nd Provisional Raiding Unit raided the US perimeter on several occasions, the reinforcements were unable to mount larger attacks and did not impede Allied airfield construction activities. The Japanese force subsequently withdrew into central Morotai where many soldiers died from disease or starvation.

In late December 1944, the US 33rd Infantry Division's 136th Infantry Regiment was brought to Morotai from New Guinea to attack the Japanese 211th Infantry Regiment in the west of the island. After landing on the island's west coast, the American regiment moved into Japanese-held territory on 26 December and advanced on the Japanese position from the south-west and north. The 136th was supported by a battalion of the 130th Infantry Regiment advancing overland from the Doroeba Plain, artillery units stationed on islands off Morotai's coast and one hundred civilian porters. The 3rd Battalion of the 167th Infantry Regiment also participated in this operation and made a difficult march from Morotai's south coast into the interior to prevent the Japanese from scattering into small groups in the island's mountains.

In early January 1945, the American force determined that two battalions of the Japanese 211th Regiment were at Hill 40, about four miles (6 km) north of the Allied perimeter. The attack on this position began on 3 January 1945 when the 136th Infantry Regiment's 1st and 2nd battalions advanced from the south-west and encountered strong resistance. The regiment used a large quantity of ammunition in this attack, and aerial resupply was needed to replenish its supplies. Both American battalions resumed their attack the next day with the support of a highly effective artillery bombardment, and reached the main Japanese position in the afternoon. During this period the 3rd Battalion of the 136th Regiment advanced on Hill 40 from the north, and destroyed the 211th Regiment's 3rd Battalion in a series of battles. This Japanese battalion had been stationed on the coast to receive supplies from Halmahera and mounted several unsuccessful attacks on the American battalion's beachhead after it landed in December.

The 136th Infantry Regiment completed its attack on Hill 40 on 5 January. The Regiment's 1st and 2nd Battalions advanced from the west and south-west and the 3rd Battalion from the north, meeting little resistance. The 1st and 2nd Battalions continued north to pursue Japanese remnants until 14 January, by which time the regiment claimed to have killed 870 Japanese soldiers and captured ten for a loss of 46 killed and 127 wounded and injured. The 3rd Battalion, 167th Infantry Regiment linked up with the 136th on 7 January after overrunning the main Japanese radio station on the island on 4 January. In mid-January, the 136th Regiment was withdrawn to the Allied perimeter where it rejoined the 33rd Division, which was staging through Morotai en route for the Allied landing in Luzon.

=== Air attacks ===
The Japanese 7th Air Division continued to raid Morotai for months after the Allied landing. The air division conducted 82 raids on Morotai involving 179 sorties between 15 September 1944 and 1 February 1945. The aircraft used in these raids flew from Ceram and the Celebes and landed at airfields on Halmahera before proceeding to their targets. While 54 of the raids caused no damage, the others resulted in the destruction of forty-two Allied aircraft and damage to another thirty-three. Allied casualties from air attack were 19 killed and 99 wounded. The most successful raid was conducted on the night of 22 November when 15 Allied planes were destroyed and eight damaged. The regular Japanese air raids ceased at the end of January 1945, though a final attack took place on 22 March. USAAF night fighters had only limited success as raiders were normally detected only shortly before they entered anti-aircraft gun defended zones; these guns shot down most of the 26 Japanese aircraft lost over Morotai. The official history of the USAAF's night fighter force states that Morotai "was probably the most difficult task undertaken by American night fighters during World War II" due to the difficulty of detecting incoming raiders.

The PT boat force at Morotai was reduced to a single squadron by February 1945 but remained active until the end of the war. As well as patrolling around Morotai, the boats operated in the eastern NEI to raid Japanese positions and support Australian and Dutch scouting parties. In May 1945 PT boats and the Australian Z Special Unit rescued the Sultan of Ternate along with his court and harem during an operation codenamed Project Opossum after he was mistreated by the Japanese. By the end of the war the PT boats had conducted nearly 1,300 patrols and destroyed 50 barges and 150 small craft off Morotai and Halmahera.

=== Final offensive ===
The 93rd Infantry Division arrived on Morotai during April 1945 to replace the 31st Division, which was redeployed to participate in the liberation of Mindanao. The 93rd Division was a segregated African American unit and was mainly used for security and labor tasks during the war. Racial tensions between the 31st Division, which was drawn mainly from segregated Deep South states, and the 93rd Division led to frequent fights between members of the two units while they were on Morotai. The last elements of the 31st Division left Morotai on 12 April.

The 93rd Division undertook combat operations and operated logistics facilities. The division's commander tasked his combat units with destroying the remaining Japanese force on Morotai. In April 1945 the Allies estimated that this comprised between 500 and 600 men. Most of Japanese troops were located along the island's west coast in groups of 50 or less and generally stayed close to civilian gardens. They were under orders to raid Allied facilities on Morotai but did not do so. The Japanese rarely received supplies as Allied PT boats intercepted most of the barges which were sent to Morotai. The last Japanese supply barges from Halmahera reached Morotai on 12 May 1945.

Troops from the 93rd Division began intensive operations in April 1945. Patrols were sent out from the Allied perimeter and troops were landed at multiple points along Morotai's west and north coasts. This led to scattered skirmishes with small Japanese forces. The 93rd Division also used leaflets and radio broadcasts to persuade Japanese soldiers to surrender, with some success. One of the division's main goals was to capture Colonel Ouchi and this was achieved by a patrol from the 25th Infantry Regiment on 2 August. Ouchi was one of the highest-ranked Japanese officers to be captured before the end of the war in mid-August 1945. Some elements of the 93rd Division were transferred from Morotai to the Philippines shortly before the war ended.

== Aftermath ==
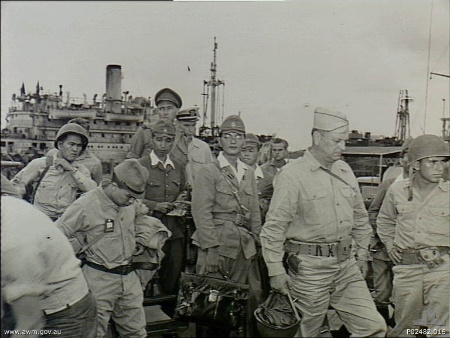
The Japanese commanding officers at Halmahera land at Morotai to surrender to the 93rd Division.

Morotai remained an important Allied base after Leyte was secured. Aircraft of the Thirteenth Air Force and Australian First Tactical Air Force (formerly No. 10 Operational Group RAAF) were based at Morotai and attacked targets in the NEI and southern Philippines until the end of the war. From April 1945, the island was also used by the Australian I Corps to mount the Borneo Campaign. Australian Army engineers expanded the base facilities at Morotai to support this operation. Due to overcrowding, some Australian camp sites were located outside the American perimeter. Members of the 93rd Division operated port facilities at Morotai alongside Australians to support the Borneo Campaign.

Morotai was the scene of a number of surrender ceremonies following the surrender of Japan. About 660 Japanese troops on Morotai capitulated to Allied forces after 15 August. The 93rd Division also accepted the surrender of the 40,000 Japanese troops at Halmahera on 26 August after the Japanese commander there was brought to Morotai on a US Navy PT boat. On 9 September 1945, Australian General Thomas Blamey accepted the surrender of the Japanese Second Army at a ceremony held on the I Corps' sports ground at Morotai. Private Teruo Nakamura, the last confirmed Japanese holdout on Morotai or elsewhere, was captured by Indonesian Air Force personnel on 18 December 1974.

The facilities on Morotai continued to be heavily used by the Allies in the months after the war. The Australian force responsible for the occupation and military administration of the eastern NEI was headquartered at Morotai until April 1946, when the Dutch colonial government was reestablished. The island was also one of the sites where the Australian and NEI militaries conducted war crimes trials of Japanese personnel. After Indonesian independence, the airport was used as a military base by the Indonesian Air Force, and in 2012 it was opened to civilian traffic.
