= Twelfth Army (Japan) =

Japanese Twelfth Army
- Active: November 7, 1938 - August 15, 1945
- Country: Empire of Japan
- Branch: Imperial Japanese Army
- Type: Infantry
- Role: Corps
- Garrison/HQ: Zhengzhou
- Nickname: Jin ("Benevolence")

The Japanese 12th Army (第12軍, Dai-jyūni gun) was an army of the Imperial Japanese Army during the Second Sino-Japanese War.

== History ==
The Japanese 12th Army was formed on November 7, 1938, under the North China Area Army as a garrison force for the occupation the provinces North China. It served primary as a training and reserve unit, and participated in counter-insurgency operations.

The 59th division famous for its wartime atrocities was attached to the Twelfth Army from February 1942 till May 1945.

The 12th Army was demobilized at Zhengzhou, Henan Province on the surrender of Japan.

== List of Commanders ==
=== Commanding officers ===
	Name	From	To
1	Lieutenant General Kamezo Suetaka	9 November 1938	12 September 1939
2	Lieutenant General Sadataka Iida	12 September 1939	1 March 1941
3	Lieutenant General Ichiji Dobashi	1 March 1941	1 March 1943
4	Lieutenant General Seiichi Kita	1 March 1943	7 February 1944
5	Lieutenant General Eitaro Uchiyama	5 February 1944	7 April 1945
6	Lieutenant General Takashi Takamori	7 April 1945	15 August 1945

=== Chief of Staff ===
	Name	From	To
1	Lt. General Asasaburo Kobayashi	9 November 1938	1 December 1939
2	Lt. General Yoshio Hongo	1 December 1939	2 December 1940
3	Lt. General Masafumi Yamauchi	2 December 1940	15 October 1941
4	Major General Etsujiro Kono	15 October 1941	10 December 1942
5	Major General Tadao Teragaki	10 December 1942	16 October 1944
6	Lt. General Makoto Nakayama	16 October 1944	1 September 1945
