= Western New Guinea campaign =

1944–1945 campaign of World War II

- Part of World War II, Pacific War
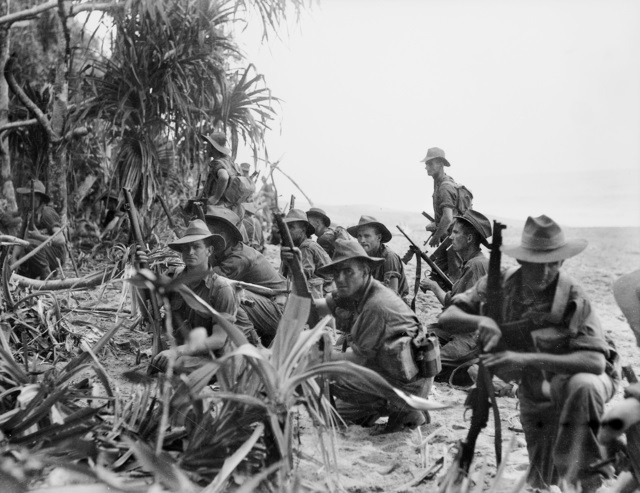
- Australian infantrymen resting on a river bank before attacking Japanese positions near Matapau in January 1945
Date	22 April 1944 – 15 August 1945
Location	Territory of New Guinea and Netherlands New Guinea
Result	Allied victory

Belligerents
United States; Australia; Netherlands; United Kingdom	Japan

Strength
Unknown	Unknown

Casualties and losses
1,922+ killed or missing 8,000+ wounded	42,000+ dead and nearly 1,000 POWs

The Western New Guinea campaign was a series of actions in the New Guinea campaign of World War II. Dutch East Indies KNIL, United States and Australian forces assaulted Japanese bases and positions in the northwest coastal areas of Netherlands New Guinea and adjoining parts of the Australian Territory of New Guinea. The campaign began with Operations Reckless and Persecution, which were amphibious landings by the U.S. I Corps at Hollandia and Aitape on 22 April 1944. Fighting in western New Guinea continued until the end of the war.

== Major battles and sub-campaigns ==
- Landing at Aitape
- Battle of Hollandia
- Battle of Wakde
- Battle of Lone Tree Hill
- Battle of Biak
- Battle of Noemfoor
- Battle of Driniumor River
- Battle of Sansapor
- Battle of Morotai
- Aitape-Wewak campaign

== See also ==
- Operation Semut
- Operation Agas
- Naval Base Borneo
- US Naval Advance Bases
- List of Royal Australian Navy bases

== Bibliography ==
- Keogh, Eustace (1965). South West Pacific 1941–45. Melbourne, Victoria: Grayflower Publications. OCLC 7185705.
- Long, Gavin (1963). The Final Campaigns. Australia in the War of 1939–1945, Series 1 – Army, Volume VII. Canberra, Australian Capital Territory: Australian War Memorial. OCLC 1297619.
- Morison, Samuel Eliot (2001). New Guinea and the Marianas, March 1944 – August 1944. History of United States Naval Operations in World War II. Urbana, Illinois: University of Illinois Press. ISBN 978-0-25207-038-9.
- Smith, Robert Ross (1996). The Approach to the Philippines. Washington D.C.: Center of Military History, U.S. Army. LCCN 53060474.
