= Freddie Stowers =

African-American US Army corporal and Medal of Honor recipient killed in action in WWI

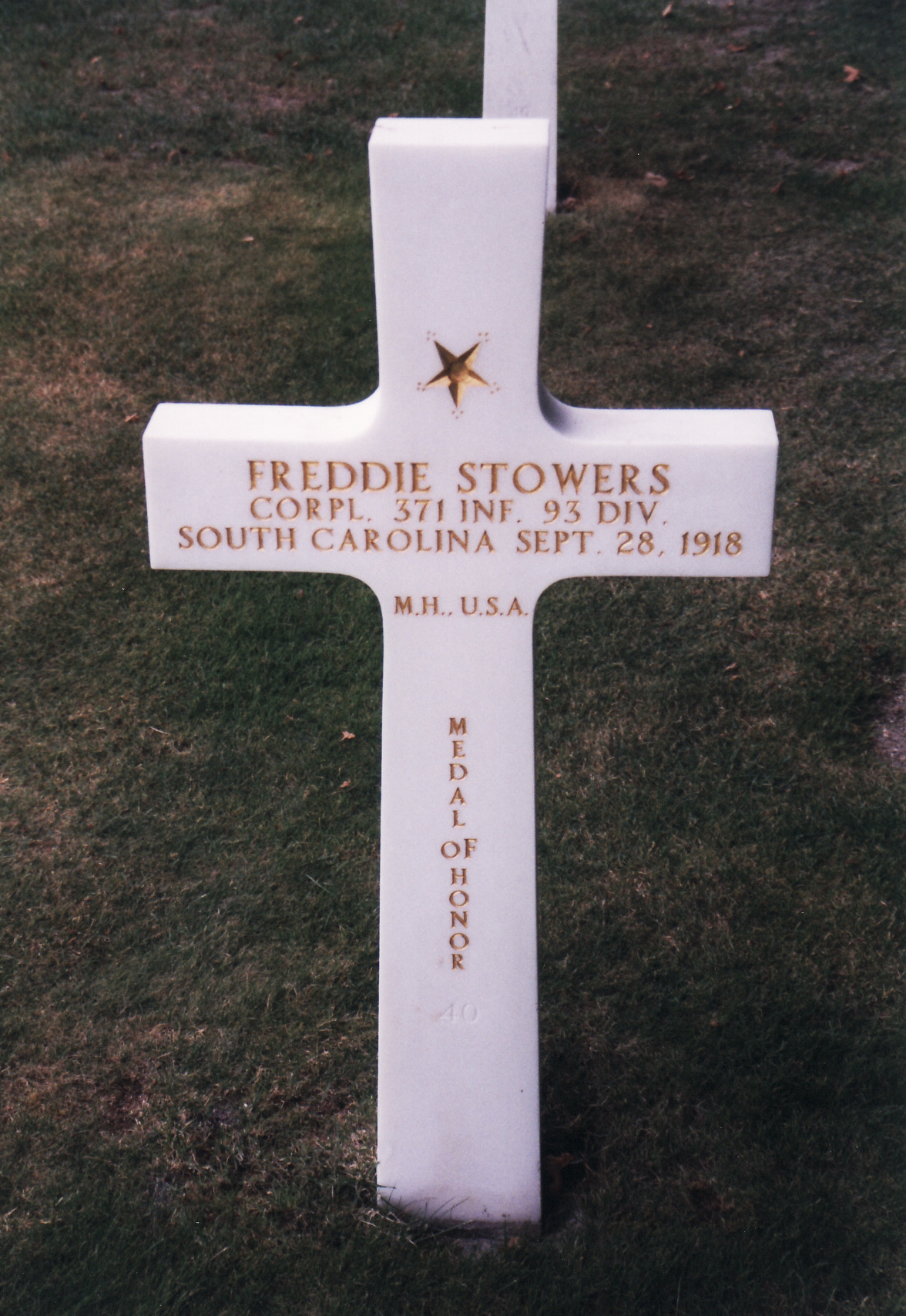
- Stowers' grave at Meuse-Argonne American Cemetery
- Born: January 12, 1896; Sandy Springs, South Carolina, US
- Died: September 28, 1918 (aged 22) near Ardeuil-et-Montfauxelles, Ardennes, France
- Burial place: Meuse-Argonne American Cemetery
- Military career
- Allegiance: United States
- Branch: United States Army
- Service years: 1917–1918 †
- Rank: Corporal
- Units: 371st Infantry Regiment, 93d Division, 157th Red Hand Division (France)
- Conflicts: World War I; Meuse-Argonne offensive
- Awards: Medal of Honor

Freddie Stowers (January 12, 1896 – September 28, 1918) was an African-American corporal in the United States Army who was killed in action during World War I while serving in an American unit under 157th Infantry Division of the French Army, called the "Red Hand Division". Over 70 years later, he posthumously received the Medal of Honor and Purple Heart for his actions.

== Early life and induction into the Army ==
Stowers was born in Sandy Springs, South Carolina, the grandson of an enslaved person. Before the war, he worked as a farmhand. He married a woman named Pearl, with whom he had one daughter, Minnie Lee.

Stowers was drafted into the Army in 1917, and assigned to Company C, 1st Battalion of the segregated U.S. 371st Infantry Regiment, originally part of the 93d Infantry Division (Colored).

While the United States had established permanent African-American military units in 1866, these did not participate in the American Expeditionary Force; a peacetime role as frontier police and cavalry experts was gradually devolving into labor duties, the fate of many black troops in the world wars, despite the protests of some officers and organizations like the NAACP. Some of these "Buffalo Soldiers", as they were nicknamed, did participate in a border skirmish with Mexican troops accompanied by German military advisors near Nogales.

By contrast, Stowers was part of a new division that, by the end of the war, included a commissioned African-American officer, and saw sustained combat. Due to compromises with the institutionalized racism of the day, this combat did not take place under American command: although his unit had arrived in France as part of the American Expeditionary Force, Stowers' regiment, like the others in the division, was seconded to the 157th French Army "Red Hand Division", badly in need of reinforcement, under the command of the General Mariano Goybet.

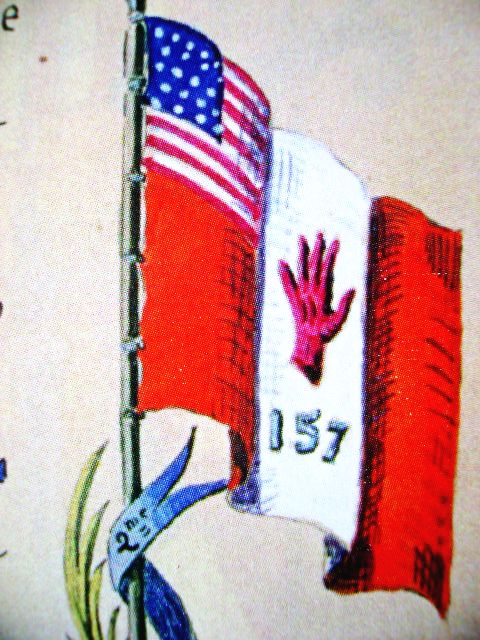
Flag of the French 157th Infantry Division commanded by General Goybet American flag section commemorating the service of the 371st US infantry regiment and 372nd US infantry regiment in the division.

== The assault on Côte 188 ==
Early on the morning of September 28, 1918, Stowers' company was ordered to assault Côte 188, a tall, heavily defended hill overlooking a farm near Ardeuil-et-Montfauxelles, in the Ardennes region of France. At first, the German defenders offered stiff resistance, bombarding the Americans with mortars, raking them with machine guns, and keeping up steady rifle fire. The advance was not halted, however: the Americans steadily gained ground until the Germans communicated their surrender with verbal and hand signals. This proved to be a ruse, and as Company C drew near the German trenches, the machine guns opened up again. Within minutes, the company's strength was reduced by half. The lieutenant commanding Stowers' platoon went down, followed by the more senior noncommissioned officers. Corporal Stowers, trained to lead a section of a rifle squad, was now in command of a battered and demoralized platoon.

Stowers began crawling toward a German machine gun nest and shouted for his men to follow. The platoon successfully reached the first German trench line and reduced the machine guns by enfilade fire. Stowers then reorganized his force and led a charge against the second German line of trenches. During this assault, Stowers was struck by fire from an enemy machine gun, but kept going until he was struck a second time. He collapsed from loss of blood, but ordered his men not to be discouraged and to keep going and take out the German guns. Inspired by Stowers' courage, the men forged ahead and successfully drove the Germans from the hill and into the plain below. Stowers, meanwhile, succumbed to his wounds on Côte 188. He is buried, along with 133 of his comrades, at the Meuse-Argonne American Cemetery and Memorial east of the village of Romagne-sous-Montfaucon.

== Medal of Honor ==
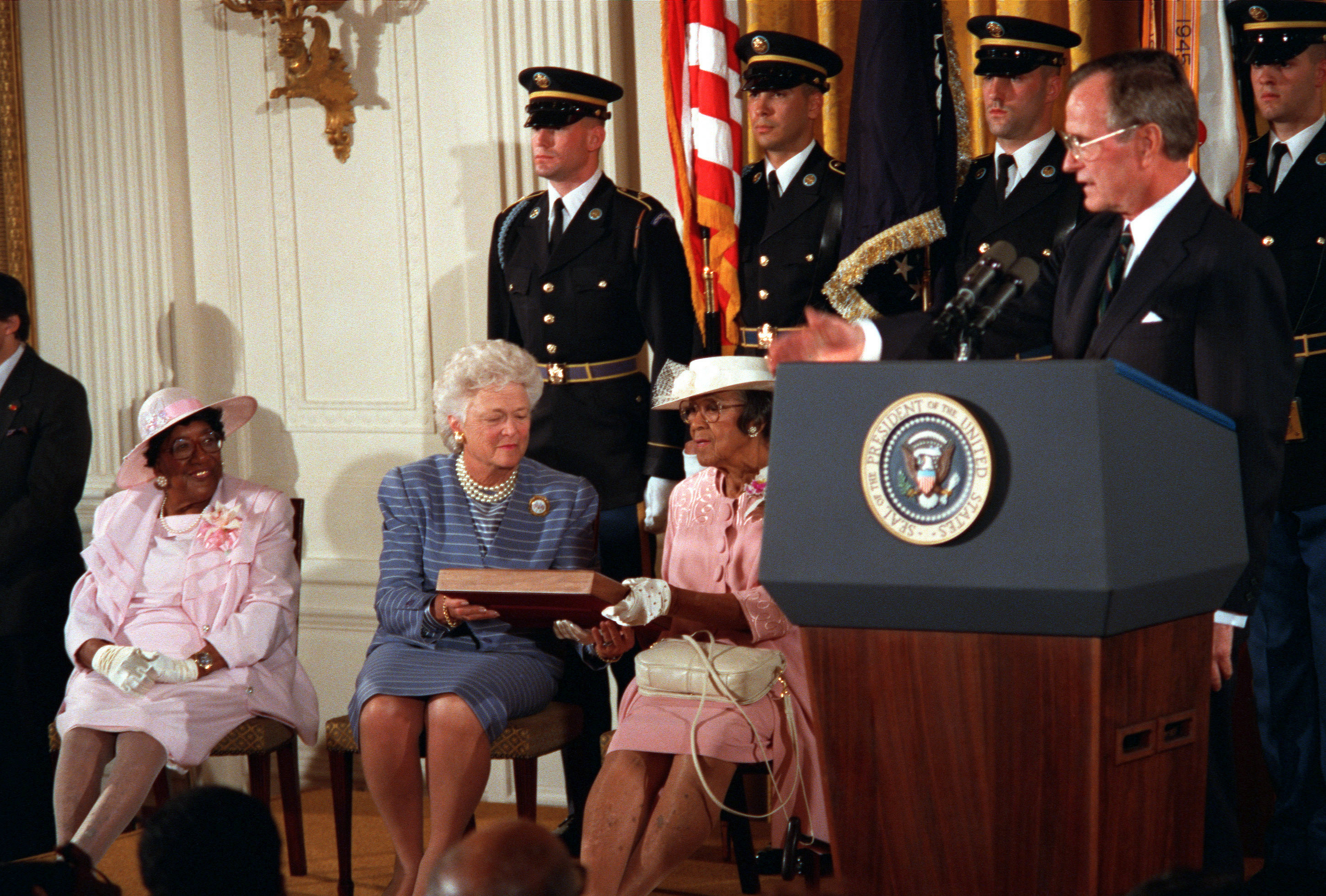
Stowers' sisters, Georgina Palmer and Mary Bowens, with Barbara Bush and President George H.W. Bush at the Medal of Honor presentation ceremony

Shortly after his death, Stowers was recommended for the Medal of Honor; however, this recommendation was never processed. Three other black soldiers were recommended for Medals of Honor, but were instead awarded the next highest award, the Distinguished Service Cross. This decision may have partly been motivated by racism; however, the criteria for the Medal of Honor were becoming stricter during this time period, partly due to a perception that it was being awarded too frequently, especially to members of the Army, while members of the naval services could receive one of two different medals, both called the Medal of Honor. Marine officer Smedley Butler, for instance, might have received three or four, instead of two, total Medals of Honor, or he might have received only one, if the actions for which they were awarded had occurred only a few years earlier or later than they did. Many possibly deserving whites and persons of color were denied medals, while some possibly less deserving people received them. In Stowers' case, the official position is that his recommendation was "misplaced," which is plausible given that the other three MOH recommendations for black soldiers were at least processed, even if the decision to award the DSC remains controversial and likely racism-related.

In 1990, at the instigation of Congress, the Department of the Army conducted a review and the Stowers recommendation was uncovered. Subsequently, a team was dispatched to France to investigate the circumstances of Stowers' death. Based on information collected by this team, the Army Decorations Board approved the award of the Medal of Honor. On April 24, 1991—seventy-three years after he was killed in action, Stowers' surviving sisters, Georgina and Mary, received the medal from President George H. W. Bush at the White House.

== Legacy ==
Lieutenant Colonel Taylor Voorhis Beattie, in his article for the magazine Military History, compared Stowers to the famous World War I soldier, Sergeant Alvin York. Both were poor, semi-literate southern farm boys who were drafted into the U.S. Army and earned the Medal of Honor for their extraordinary and inspirational courage under fire on the Western Front. York, however, survived the war and returned home to national acclamation; while Stowers made the ultimate sacrifice for his country, but remained an obscure figure who was not given his due until nearly a century after his death.

If Stowers is forgotten today, this lesson was not. The outcome of the Stowers review led to a new Army study in 1992, which found that several African American and other minority Distinguished Cross (DSC) recipients from World War II were actually deserving of Medals of Honor that had not been awarded because of bias on the part of the Decorations Board. Their DSCs were upgraded to Medals of Honor which were presented to living recipients (Vernon Baker) or their next of kin by President Bill Clinton.

Stowers Elementary School on Fort Benning, Georgia, and the Corporal Freddie Stowers Single Soldier Billeting Complex on Fort Jackson, South Carolina, are both named in his honor.

== Medal of Honor citation ==
Stowers' Medal of Honor citation reads:

The President of the United States in the name of The Congress takes pride in presenting the Medal of Honor posthumously to

Corporal Freddie Stowers
United States Army

Citation:

Cpl. Stowers, distinguished himself by exceptional heroism on September 28, 1918 while serving as a squad leader in Company C, 371st Infantry Regiment, 93d Infantry Division. His company was the lead company during the attack on Hill 188, Champagne Marne Sector, France, during World War I. A few minutes after the attack began, the enemy ceased firing and began climbing up onto the parapets of the trenches, holding up their arms as if wishing to surrender. The enemy's actions caused the American forces to cease fire and to come out into the open. As the company started forward and when within about 100 meters of the trench line, the enemy jumped back into their trenches and greeted Corporal Stowers' company with interlocking bands of machine-gun fire and mortar fire causing well over fifty percent casualties. Faced with incredible enemy resistance, Cpl. Stowers took charge, setting such a courageous example of personal bravery and leadership that he inspired his men to follow him in the attack. With extraordinary heroism and complete disregard of personal danger under devastating fire, he crawled forward leading his squad toward an enemy machine-gun nest, which was causing heavy casualties to his company. After fierce fighting, the machine-gun position was destroyed and the enemy soldiers were killed. Displaying great courage and intrepidity Cpl. Stowers continued to press the attack against a determined enemy. While crawling forward and urging his men to continue the attack on a second trench line, he was gravely wounded by machine-gun fire. Although Cpl. Stowers was mortally wounded, he pressed forward, urging on the members of his squad, until he died. Inspired by the heroism and display of bravery of Cpl. Stowers, his company continued the attack against incredible odds, contributing to the capture of Hill 188 and causing heavy enemy casualties. Cpl. Stowers' conspicuous gallantry, extraordinary heroism, and supreme devotion to his men were well above and beyond the call of duty, follow the finest traditions of military service, and reflect the utmost credit on him and the United States Army.

/S/ George H. W. Bush

== See also ==
- List of African American Medal of Honor recipients
- List of Medal of Honor recipients
- List of Medal of Honor recipients for World War I
