= Perry L. Miles =

U.S. Army brigadier general

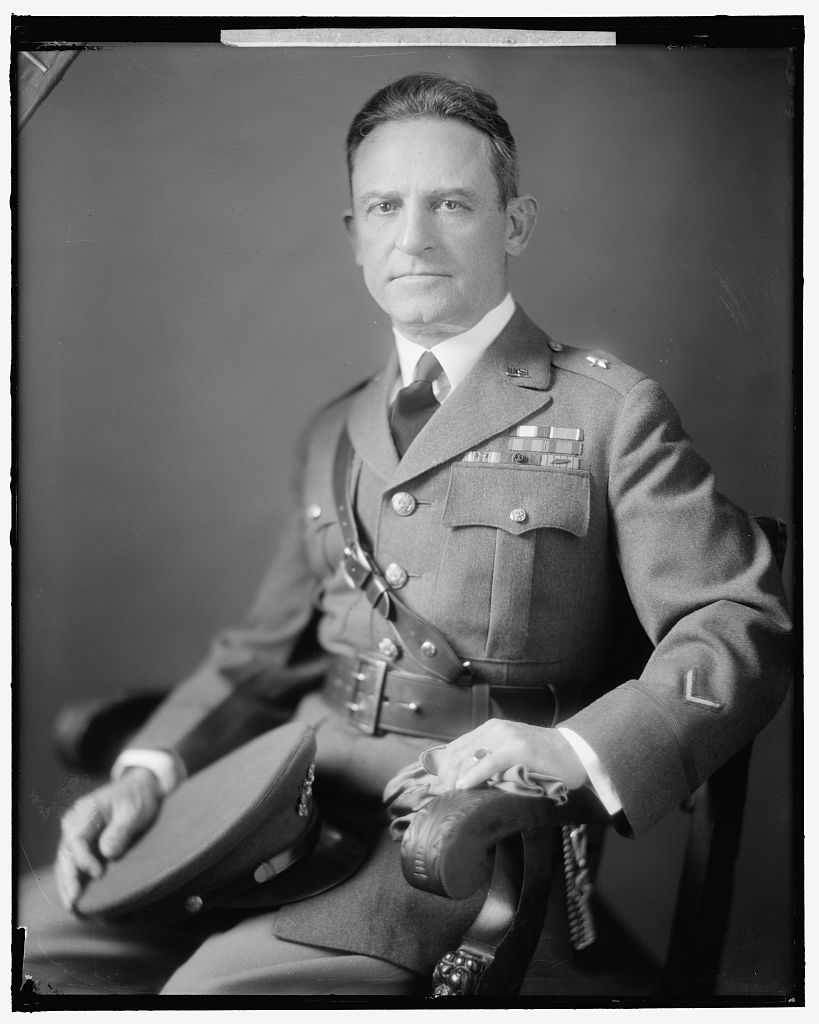
- Harris & Ewing photo, circa 1935
- Born: October 15, 1873; Westerville, Ohio, U.S.
- Died: October 17, 1961 (aged 88); Washington, District of Columbia, U.S.
- Burial place: Arlington National Cemetery
- Alma mater: United States Military Academy; University of Pennsylvania Law School (attended); United States Army Command and General Staff College; United States Army War College
- Spouse: Mary Latta Stott (m. 1921–1949)
- Military career
- Service: United States Army
- Service years: 1895–1937
- Rank: Brigadier General
- Service number: O478
- Unit: U.S. Army Infantry Branch
- Commands: Company M, 14th Infantry Regiment; 371st Infantry Regiment; 2nd Infantry Regiment; 16th Infantry Brigade; 2nd Infantry Brigade, 1st Infantry Division; 2nd Infantry Brigade, 1st Infantry Division; Northern Division, Civilian Conservation Corps; 78th Infantry Division; 77th Infantry Division; 98th Infantry Division; 1st Infantry Division
- Wars: Spanish–American War; Philippine–American War; China Relief Expedition; Pancho Villa Expedition; World War I
- Awards: Distinguished Service Cross; Army Distinguished Service Medal; Silver Star; Purple Heart; Legion of Honor (Officer) (France); Croix de Guerre with Palm (France)
- Other work: Chairman, Shenandoah Valley Regional Defense Council; Chairman, Staunton and Augusta County War Finance Committee; Chairman, Staunton Salvage Committee.

Perry L. Miles (October 15, 1873 – October 17, 1961) was a career officer in the United States Army. A veteran of the Spanish–American War, Philippine–American War, Pancho Villa Expedition, and World War I, he attained the rank of brigadier general, and his awards and decorations included the Distinguished Service Cross, Army Distinguished Service Medal, Silver Star, and Purple Heart from the United States, as well as the French Legion of Honor (Officer) and Croix de Guerre with Palm.

A native of Westerville, Ohio, Miles was raised and educated in Columbus, and was an 1891 graduate of Columbus High School. He then attended the United States Military Academy (West Point), from which he graduated in 1895 as a second lieutenant of Infantry. Miles served in the Philippines during the Spanish–American War, Philippine–American War, and China Relief Expedition. As his career advanced, he served both in the United States and the Philippines, and was a 1915 graduate of the Army Service Schools and a 1916 graduate of the Army School of the Line at Fort Leavenworth. In the period immediately preceding World War I, he served at Camp Harry J. Jones, Arizona as his regiment patrolled the U.S. border with Mexico during the Pancho Villa Expedition.

During the First World War, Miles commanded the 371st Infantry Regiment, a unit of the African-American 93rd Division, which he led during combat in France. After the war, he graduated from the United States Army Command and General Staff College (1920) and United States Army War College (1921). His later assignments included command of the 16th Infantry Brigade (now the United States Army Military District of Washington), and the 1st Infantry Division. Miles retired in 1937.

In retirement, Miles lived in Staunton, Virginia, where he authored a memoir and participated in numerous civilian activities that supported the U.S. effort in World War II. He died in Washington, D.C., on October 17, 1961, and was buried at Arlington National Cemetery.

== Early life ==
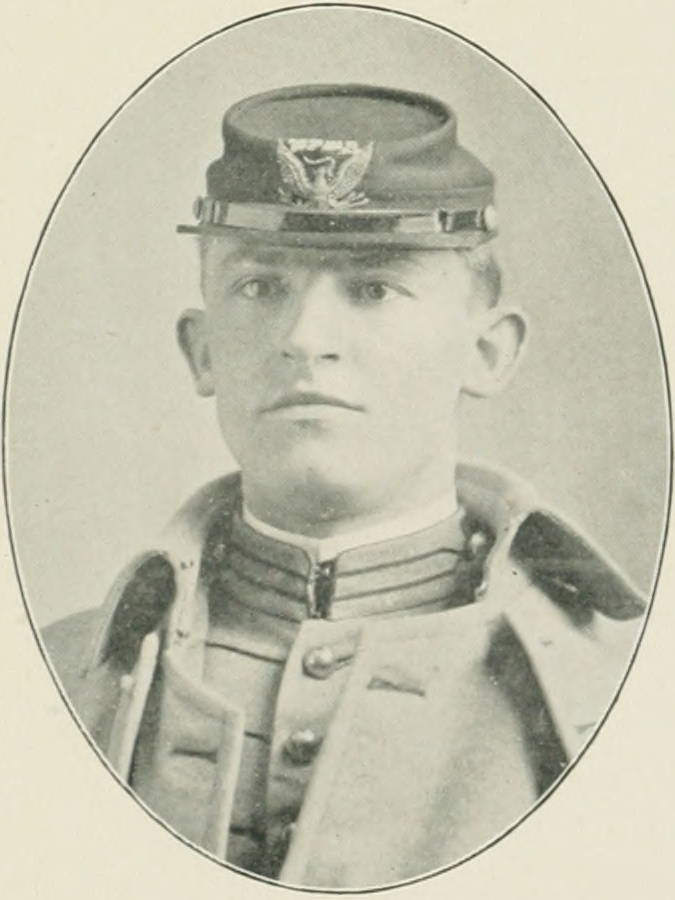
Miles as a United States Military Academy cadet c. 1895

Perry Lester Miles was born in Westerville, Ohio on October 15, 1873, the son of Judge James Alexander Miles and Mary Esther (Longwell) Miles. His family soon relocated to Columbus, Ohio, where Miles was raised and educated. He graduated from Central High School in 1891 and was appointed to the United States Military Academy by Congressman Joseph H. Outhwaite. Miles graduated in 1895 ranked 23rd of 52 and received his commission as a second lieutenant of Infantry. Among his classmates who later attained general officer rank were Casper H. Conrad Jr., Adrian Sebastian Fleming, and Thomas Walter Darrah.

== Start of career ==
After receiving his commission, Miles was assigned to the 14th Infantry Regiment at Vancouver Barracks, Washington. He was promoted to first lieutenant in April 1898, and in May 1898 was mobilized for Spanish–American War in the Philippines. Miles took part in combat in and around Manila as commander of the 14th Infantry's Company M, including the August 1898 Battle of Manila. He continued to serve in the area around Manila, and took part in 1899 Philippine–American War engagements against Filipino insurgents.

In October 1899, he received promotion to temporary captain of United States Volunteers. From 1900 to 1901, he performed quartermaster duties aboard the Army Transport Service troop carriers Warren and Sheridan, and made numerous month-long trips between Manila and San Francisco. Upon arriving in San Francisco in the summer of 1900, he was informed that the 14th Infantry had been dispatched to China as part of the China Relief Expedition, the U.S. response to the Boxer Rebellion. As a member of Warren's crew, he then traveled to China, where he assisted in organizing the 14th Infantry for departure from China and transport to the Philippines. In February 1901, Miles was promoted to permanent captain. He performed transport duty until December 1901, after which he joined the 14th Infantry at Fort Niagara, New York, where he resumed command of Company M.

In February 1903, the 14th Infantry began a two-year tour in the Philippines, and Miles' company was based on the island of Samar. In 1905 the 14th Infantry left the Philippines and was assigned to Vancouver Barracks. From 1905 to 1906, he commanded his company at the Presidio of San Francisco. In 1907, he was assigned as assistant professor of military science and tactics at Girard College in Philadelphia. While assigned to Girard, Miles attended classes at the University of Pennsylvania Law School.

== Continued career ==
Miles resumed command of Company M at Fort William Henry Harrison, Montana In February 1910. In September 1910, he was assigned as the regimental adjutant. From December 1912 to January 1913, he commanded his company at Fort Lawton, Washington. From January 1913 to August 1915, he was a student at the Fort Leavenworth, Kansas Army Service Schools. From 1915 to 1916, Miles attended the Army School of the Line at Fort Leavenworth, and he completed the course as a Distinguished Graduate. In May 1916, Miles rejoined his regiment at Camp Harry J. Jones, Arizona as it patrolled the U.S. border with Mexico during the Pancho Villa Expedition. He remained in this position until October 1916, and was promoted to major in July 1916.

From October 1916 to January 1917, Miles served with the 14th Infantry at Yuma, Arizona. From January to May 1917, he performed temporary duty with the Department of the Lakes in Chicago as inspector of National Guard units and armories in several midwestern states. From January to May 1917, he was posted to Ancón, Panama as intelligence officer (S-2) of the 5th Infantry Regiment.

With the army expanding for World War I, in August 1917, Miles was promoted to temporary colonel and assigned to Camp Jackson, South Carolina as commander of the 371st Infantry Regiment, a unit of the African-American 93rd Division. Upon arrival in France, Miles' regiment was assigned to the French 157th Infantry Division, which he led during several campaigns and battles. He returned to the United States in February 1919, and was executive officer of the 156th Depot Brigade as it carried out post-war demobilization of army units at Camp Jackson. From March to July 1919, he served in the War Plans Division on the staff of the War Department, and he was reduced in rank to temporary lieutenant colonel in July 1919, which was made permanent in August. In August 1919, he became a student at the United States Army Command and General Staff College, from which he graduated in June 1920.

== Later career ==
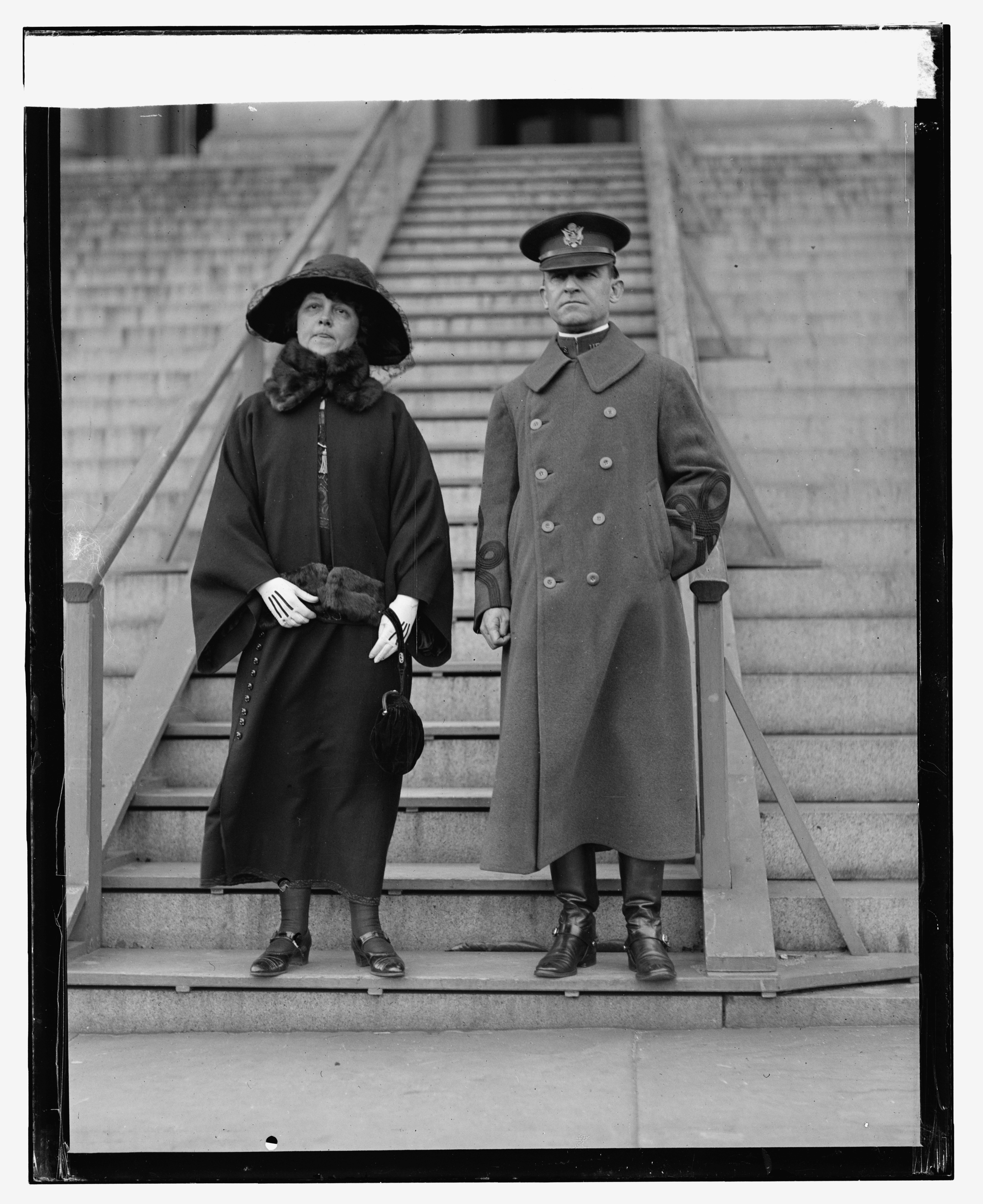
Col. & Mrs. Perry L. Miles, March 14, 1924. National Photo Company Collection, Library of Congress.

In July 1920, Miles was promoted to permanent colonel, and in August he began attendance at the United States Army War College. He graduated in July 1921, after which he joined the faculty at the Fort Leavenworth General Service Schools. In 1921, he married Mary Latta Stott, the daughter of Colonel William Wells Stott. They had no children and were married until her death in 1949. From July 1923 to July 1925, he served on the staff of the Militia Bureau. He was then assigned to Fort Sheridan, Illinois, where he assumed command of the 2nd Infantry Regiment.

In August 1928, Miles was assigned to the University of California, Los Angeles as professor of military science and tactics. In 1932, he was promoted to brigadier general and assigned to command the 16th Infantry Brigade (now the United States Army Military District of Washington). While in this post, Miles was in command of the troops that were called to carry out the July 1932 dispersal by force of the Bonus Army. In April 1936, he was assigned to Fort Ontario, New York, as commander of the 2nd Infantry Brigade, a unit of the 1st Division, as well as the Northern Division of the Civilian Conservation Corps. Miles assumed command of the 1st Division in October 1936, and from January to October 1937, concurrently commanded the division's 1st Infantry Brigade. While commanding the 1st Infantry Brigade, Miles was also assigned as commander of the 77th Division, 78th Division, and 98th Division; these three units were part of the Organized Reserve and consisted mainly of officer cadre. In October 1937, Miles left the Army as the result of attaining the mandatory retirement age of 64.

== Retirement and death ==
In retirement, Miles resided first in Staunton, Virginia, and later in Johnstown, Ohio. During World War II, he participated in support efforts on the home front, including service as chairman of the Shenandoah Valley Regional Defense Council, the Staunton and Augusta County War Finance Committee and the Staunton Salvage Committee. Miles also authored a memoir, 1961's Fallen Leaves. His civic and professional memberships included the American Legion, Military Order of the World Wars, United Spanish War Veterans, and Military Order of the Carabao.

Miles died at Walter Reed Army Medical Center in Washington, D.C., on October 17, 1961. He was buried at Arlington National Cemetery.

== Awards ==
Maj. Gen. John L. Hines, U.S. Army Deputy Chief of Staff, decorates Col. Perry L. Miles (left), with Distinguished Service Cross

Miles was a recipient of the Silver Star and Purple Heart, as well as the Spanish Campaign Medal, Philippine Campaign Medal and World War I Victory Medal. In addition, he received the French Legion of Honor (Officer) and Croix de Guerre with Palm.

In 1919, Miles received the Army Distinguished Service Medal in acknowledgement of his World War I accomplishments. In 1924, he received the Distinguished Service Cross in recognition of his February 1899 heroism while serving in the Philippines.

=== Distinguished Service Cross citation ===
The President of the United States of America, authorized by Act of Congress, July 9, 1918, takes pleasure in presenting the Distinguished Service Cross to First Lieutenant (Infantry) Perry Lester Miles, United States Army, for extraordinary heroism while serving with 14th Infantry, in action near Manila, Philippine Islands, 5 February 1899. During the attack by two companies of the 14th Infantry on blockhouse No. 14 and adjacent trenches strongly held by insurgent forces, when the commanding officer was mortally wounded, the advance was checked and the troops were partially demoralized in the face of a heavy concentrated fire from the front and both flanks, Lieutenant Miles assumed command, ordered the advance to continue, and went along the line with utter disregard of the hostile fire and urged his men forward. Then, with exceptional gallantry and the highest qualities of leadership, he dashed forward, many yards ahead of his men, calling on them to follow, and drove the enemy from their position. His splendid example of personal heroism, courage, and coolness furnished the needed inspiration to the wavering command and resulted in the successful accomplishment of a seemingly impossible attack.

Orders: War Department, General Orders No. 10 (1924)

=== Army Distinguished Service Medal citation ===
For meritorious services. As commander of the 371st Infantry, which, during its active operations, was attached to French forces, he conducted his regiment with success. By his tact and sound judgment he maintained at all times harmonious relationship with the allied forces to which his unit was assigned, rendering important services to the American Expeditionary Forces.

Orders: War Department, General Orders No. 89 (1919)
