= 372nd Infantry Regiment =

- Active: 1918–1919; 1921-1946
- Country: USA
- Branch: Army
- Type: Infantry
- Mottos: Fidelis et Paratus (Faithful and Ready)
- Engagements: World War I *Champagne–Marne; *Meuse–Argonne
- Decorations: French Croix de Guerre

Commanders
- Notable commanders: Col. Herschel Tupes, author 1906 Manual of Bayonet Training

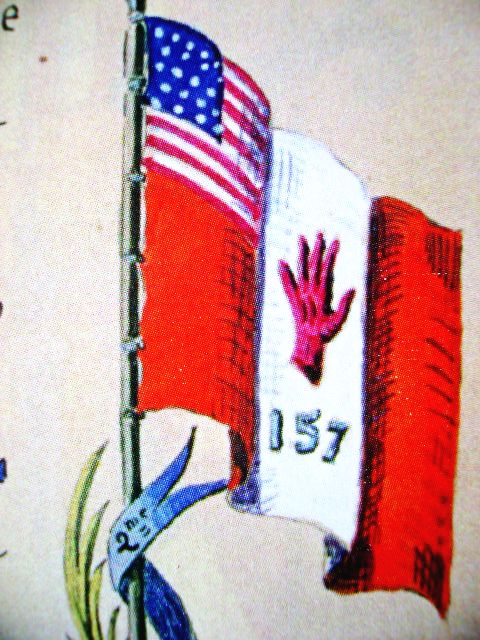
Flag of the French 157th Infantry Division, with American flag section commemorating the service of the 371st and 372nd US infantry regiments in the division.

The 372nd Infantry Regiment was a segregated African American regiment, nominally a part of the 93rd Division, that served in World War I under French Army command, and also in World War II. In World War II the regiment was not attached to a division, and served in the continental United States (CONUS) and Hawaii. In both wars the unit had primarily African American enlisted men and white officers.

== World War I ==
=== Lineage ===
During World War I, the 372nd Infantry Regiment was composed of the following segregated National Guard units as well as draftees:

- 1st Separate Battalion, Infantry, of the District of Columbia (originally organized by Charles Remond Douglass circa 1880)
- 9th Separate Battalion, Infantry, of Ohio
- Separate Company, Infantry, of Maryland
- Separate Company, Infantry, of Tennessee
- Separate Company, Infantry, of Massachusetts
- Separate Company, Infantry, of Connecticut
- 250 drafted men from Camp Custer, Michigan, recruited mainly from Michigan and Wisconsin.

=== History ===
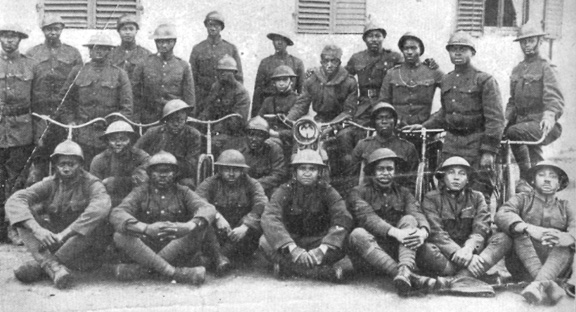
Colored messengers of Motorcycle Corps, 372nd Headquarters, who kept communication lines alive at all hours during the big drive in Champagne, Argonne and at Verdun.

The 372nd Infantry Regiment was organized in January 1918 at Camp Stewart, Virginia and initially assigned to the 93rd Division (Provisional).

Moved to France in March 1918. The 93rd Division was never fully organized, and the 372nd Infantry was seconded, along with the 371st Infantry Regiment, to the 157th Infantry Division of the French Army, called the "Red Hand Division". Under the command of General Mariano Goybet, the division was in need of reinforcements. During the fighting on the Western Front in the Champagne region, this division was in the French IX Corps of the French 4th Army. After fighting in the Champagne–Marne region (28 September-7 October 1918) and the Meuse–Argonne offensive, the regiment moved to the Vosges Mountains area of the front. The regiment returned to the United States in February 1919, and was demobilized 28 February 1919 at Camp Jackson, South Carolina.

A monument to the 372nd Infantry Regiment was erected after the war south of Monthois to commemorate the unit's fighting in the Champagne region, in which the regiment took 579 casualties (total killed, wounded, prisoners, and missing).

=== "Over the Top" ===
Emmet J. Scott's Official History of the American Negro in the World War provides a chronological record of when the men were fighting with gallantry in the Champagne region of France for victory:

"Over the Top September 28, 1918, the 3rd Battalion started after the Boche. The first blow being delivered by the 2nd Moroccan Division of shock troops. The retreating Boches are still bombarding our position. Machine gun fire is thick and the 88s are falling like hail.

"On the morning of September 29, 1918, we are trying hard to keep up with the retreating enemy, which is retreating fast, unable to stand our assault. This afternoon it is raining which is unfortunate for our wounded, as there are many.

"Today is September 30, 1918, and we find that the 1st Battalion is on our right, and advancing fast in the rain and mud. Machine gun opposition is still stiff. Our casualties are small and we have captured a large number of prisoners.

"October 1, 1918, we are meeting with a stiff resistance from the enemy who has fortified himself in a hill during the past night. Owing to the bad condition of the ground we are not getting any support from the French artillery.

"October 2, 1918, we have driven the enemy out of Fontaine-en-Dormois and are now in the village. Still we are giving the enemy no rest, they are retreating across the valley to one of their supply bases which has a railroad running into the same. The enemy is now burning the supplies which cannot be moved.

"October 3, 1918, we have advanced and captured the little village of Ardeuil and a considerable amount of war material. Our losses have been rather heavy during the past 24 hours, but we have inflicted a much heavier loss on the enemy. On our right the 1st Battalion has taken the village of Séchault after some hard fighting by Company A.

"October 4, 1918, the 2nd Battalion is going in this morning, and we are resting at Vieox, which is about four kilometers from Monthois and is one of the enemy's railroad centers and hospital bases. The enemy is busy destroying supplies and moving wounded. We can see trains moving out of Monthois. Our artillery is bombarding all roads and railroads in the vicinity. The enemies' fire is fierce and we are expecting a counter-attack.

"October 5, 1918, the German artillery has opened up good and strong and we are on the alert. They attacked us and a stiff hand-to-hand combat ensued. Again he has been driven back, suffering an exceedingly heavy loss. We have taken many prisoners from about twelve different regiments. After resting a little, we continued our advance and are now on the outskirts of Monthois.

"October 6, 1918, the enemy is throwing a stiff barrage on our left where the 333rd French Infantry is attacking. The enemy is again being driven back. The liaison work of the 157th Division has been wonderful, not the slightest gap has been left open.

"October 7, 1918, our patrols entered Monthois early in the morning but were driven out by machine gun fire, but returned with the gun and its crew. We have just received word that we are to be relieved by the 76th Regiment, French, sometime during the night; we were relieved at 8:00 P. M. We hiked a very long distance over the ground. We fought so hard to take Minecourt where the regiment proceeded to reorganize.

"Regiment reached Somme-Bionne Oct. 9, 1918. Regiment left Somme-Bionne Oct. 11, 1918 to entrain for Vignemont. Left Valmy 8:00 A. M. Oct. 12, 1918 and arrived at Vignemont Oct. 13, 1918. Hiked 15 kilometers to St. Leonard and arrived Sd. Left St. Leonard for Ban-de-Laveline in the Dept. of the Vosges Oct. 15, 1918, arrived at Laveline 10:15 P. M. Sd.

"November 7, 1918, 1 officer and 22 enlisted men captured by German patrol. Nov. 10, 1918, a patrol of Co. A, took several prisoners from a German patrol.

=== Experiences in France ===
As the 372nd Infantry Regiment was a part of the 93rd Division, that was assigned to the French army, these African American troops often interacted with French soldiers. Many of the soldiers were complimentary of the French soldiers that they were fighting alongside, and similarly many had positive things to say about French civilians.

=== Citation for the men of 157th Division ===
On arrival in France, as this unit was transferred into the French command, its decorations are French rather than American. This unit was extremely well decorated, receiving both unit and numerous individual citations including the Croix de Guerre and Légion d'Honneur. Corporal Clarence Van Allen won the Médaille militaire one of a few Americans to do so.

The following order was issued to the 157th Division following the campaign in the Champagne region:

P. C. October 8, 1918.

"157th Division.

"Staff.

General Order No. 234

"In transmitting to you with legitimate pride the thanks and congratulations of the General Garnier-Duplessis, allow me, my dear friends of all ranks, Americans and French, to thank you from the bottom of my heart as a chief and a soldier for the expression of gratitude for the glory which you have lent our good 157th Division. I had full confidence in you but you have surpassed my hopes."

"During these nine days of hard fighting you have progressed nine kilometers through powerful organized defenses, taken nearly 600 prisoners, 15 guns of different calibres, 20 minenwerfers, and nearly 150 machine guns, secured an enormous amount of engineering material, an important supply of artillery ammunition, brought down by your fire three enemy aeroplanes.

"THE RED HAND", sign of the Division, thanks to you, became a bloody hand which took the Boche by the throat and made him cry for mercy. You have well avenged our glorious dead.

Signed General Goybet

== Interwar and World War II ==
The 372nd Infantry Regiment was reconstituted in the National Guard and allotted by January 1925; the 1st Battalion to the District of Columbia, the 2nd Battalion to Ohio, and the 3rd Battalion to Massachusetts.

- 1st Battalion reorganized and federally recognized in the District of Columbia National Guard as the 142nd Engineer Battalion (Colored) on 19 April 1921. Redesignated as 1st Separate Battalion, Infantry on 1 April 1923. Redesignated 1st Battalion, 372nd Infantry on 18 December 1925. Only Company A was active during this period.
- 2nd Battalion reorganized in the Ohio National Guard on 1 April 1924 as the 1st Separate Battalion, Infantry, with headquarters federally recognized on 22 September 1924 at Columbus, Ohio. Redesignated 2nd Battalion, 372d Infantry on 1 April 1925.
- 3rd Battalion reorganized in the Massachusetts National Guard on 30 November 1920 as the 2nd Separate Battalion, Infantry, with headquarters federally recognized on 15 March 1922 at Boston, Massachusetts. Redesignated 3rd Battalion, 372d Infantry on 1 January 1925.

Company A, 372nd Infantry was redesignated the Headquarters Company on 3 September 1940. Concurrently, the 1st Separate Battalion, Infantry, New Jersey National Guard, was redesignated the 1st Battalion, 372nd Infantry on 11 September 1940. The 1st Separate Company, Infantry, Maryland National Guard was redesignated the Service Company, 372nd Infantry on 11 September 1940.

On 10 March 1941 the 372nd Infantry was inducted into service at home stations. 2nd Battalion at Columbus, Ohio, 3rd Battalion at Boston, Massachusetts, and service company from Maryland.

The unit moved to Fort Dix, New Jersey 17 March 1941; following the attack on Pearl Harbor on 7 December 1941 the regiment moved to New York City 17 December 1941, assigned to the Eastern Defense Command 1 May 1942 for security and other duties in Greater New York. On 21 January 1944 assigned to the 2nd Service Command, transferred to Camp Breckinridge, Kentucky under XXII Corps 20 April 1944, where it provided an accelerated six-week course of infantry training (four weeks of familiarization, qualification, and transition firing, and two weeks of tactical training) to African-American soldiers who were formerly members of disbanded anti-aircraft and tank destroyer units or who had volunteered for transfer to the infantry from other branches of the Army. Reassigned to Fourth Army in September 1944. Moved to Fort Huachuca, Arizona 11 November 1944. Prepared for overseas movement; staged at Fort Lawton, Washington state 24 April 1945 and departed Seattle Port of Embarkation 29 April 1945. Arrived in Hawaii 9 May 1945 and assigned to the Central Pacific Base Command on 15 May 1945, relieving the 98th Infantry Division so that division could prepare to invade Japan; inactivated in Hawaii 31 January 1946.

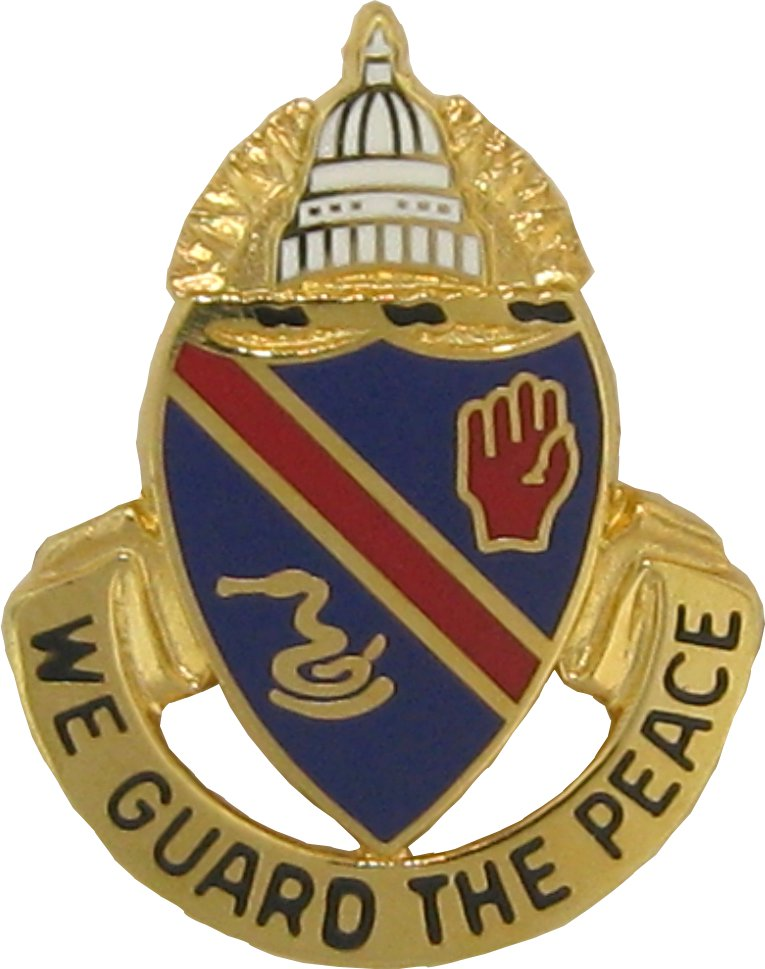
Distinctive Unit Insignia: 372 MP Bn

On 13 August 1945, at the end of hostilities, the unit was deployed as follows: Schofield Barracks, Hawaii, less 2nd Battalion at Hilo, Co. D at Bellows Field, Co. F on Kauai, Co. G on Maui, Co. H on Molokai, Co. I at Aiea, and Co. K at Fort Shafter.

The regimental Lineage was carried on postwar by HHD/372nd Military Police Battalion (ARNG DC) and the 372nd Infantry Battalion ("Ninth Ohio") O.N.G. The 372nd Infantry Battalion was broken up in 1959 and its components reorganized as elements of the 38th Ordnance Battalion except for Company C, which became the 3582nd Transportation Company (part). The lineage of the Ninth Ohio is currently carried by the 237th Support Battalion.

== Campaign streamers ==
World War II

- Pacific Theater without inscription

== Notable members ==
- Urbane F. Bass, African American medical officer, killed in action 6 October 1918, Distinguished Service Cross recipient.
- Edward Dugger, African-American lieutenant-colonel
- Russell Procope, musician

== See also ==
372nd U.S. Infantry regiment on French Wikipedia (in French)
