= Urbane =

Urbane may refer to:

- Urbanity
- LG Watch Urbane, a 2015 smartwatch

== People with the given name ==
- Urbane F. Bass (1880–1918), African-American doctor and first lieutenant in the United States Army
- Urbane Pickering (1899–1970), American baseball player

== See also ==
- Urban (disambiguation)
- Urbane Jazz, a 1955 album by Roy Eldridge and Benny Carter
