= General Fleming =

General Fleming may refer to:

- Adrian Sebastian Fleming (1872–1940), U.S. Army brigadier general
- Christopher Fleming, 17th Baron Slane (1669–1726), Irish-born Portuguese Army lieutenant general
- James Fleming (British Army officer) (1682–1751), British Army major general
- Lawrence J. Fleming (1922–2006), U.S. Air Force major general
- Philip Bracken Fleming (1887–1955), U.S. Army major general
- Raymond H. Fleming (1889–1974), U.S. Army major general

== See also ==
- Roger Le Fleming (1895–1962), British Indian Army major general
- Attorney General Fleming (disambiguation)
