= 157th Infantry Division (France) =

157th Infantry Division 'Red Hand Division'
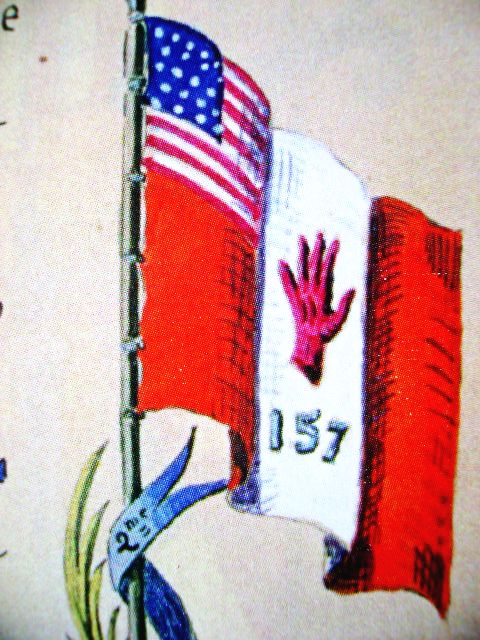
- Flag of the French 157th Infantry Division (Red hand Division ) commanded by General Goybet American flag section commemorating the service of the 371st Infantry Regiment (United States) and 372nd Infantry Regiment (United States) in the division.
- Active: 28 April 1915 – 11 November 1918
- Country: France (1915-1918) and United States (1918)
- Branch: French Army
- Type: Infantry
- Size: Division
- Nickname: Red Hand Division
- Engagements: World War I

157th Infantry Division was an infantry division of the French Army during the First World War. One source says it was known as the Red Hand Division from a device on its color. Two segregated African American regiments, integrated the division in WWI under the command of Général Mariano Goybet and received the French Croix de Guerre. Freddie Stowers of the 371st Infantry Regiment was posthumously awarded the Medal of Honor. The 372nd Infantry Regiment was composed of segregated National Guard units as well as draftees. Corporal Clarence Van Allen won the Médaille militaire.

== Commanders ==
- 28/04/1915 - 15/09/1915: General Gillain
- .
- 23/12/1915 - : General Blazer
- 23/05/1916: General Brulard
- 28/01/1917: General Beaudemoulin
- 04/05/1918 - Dissolution: General Goybet

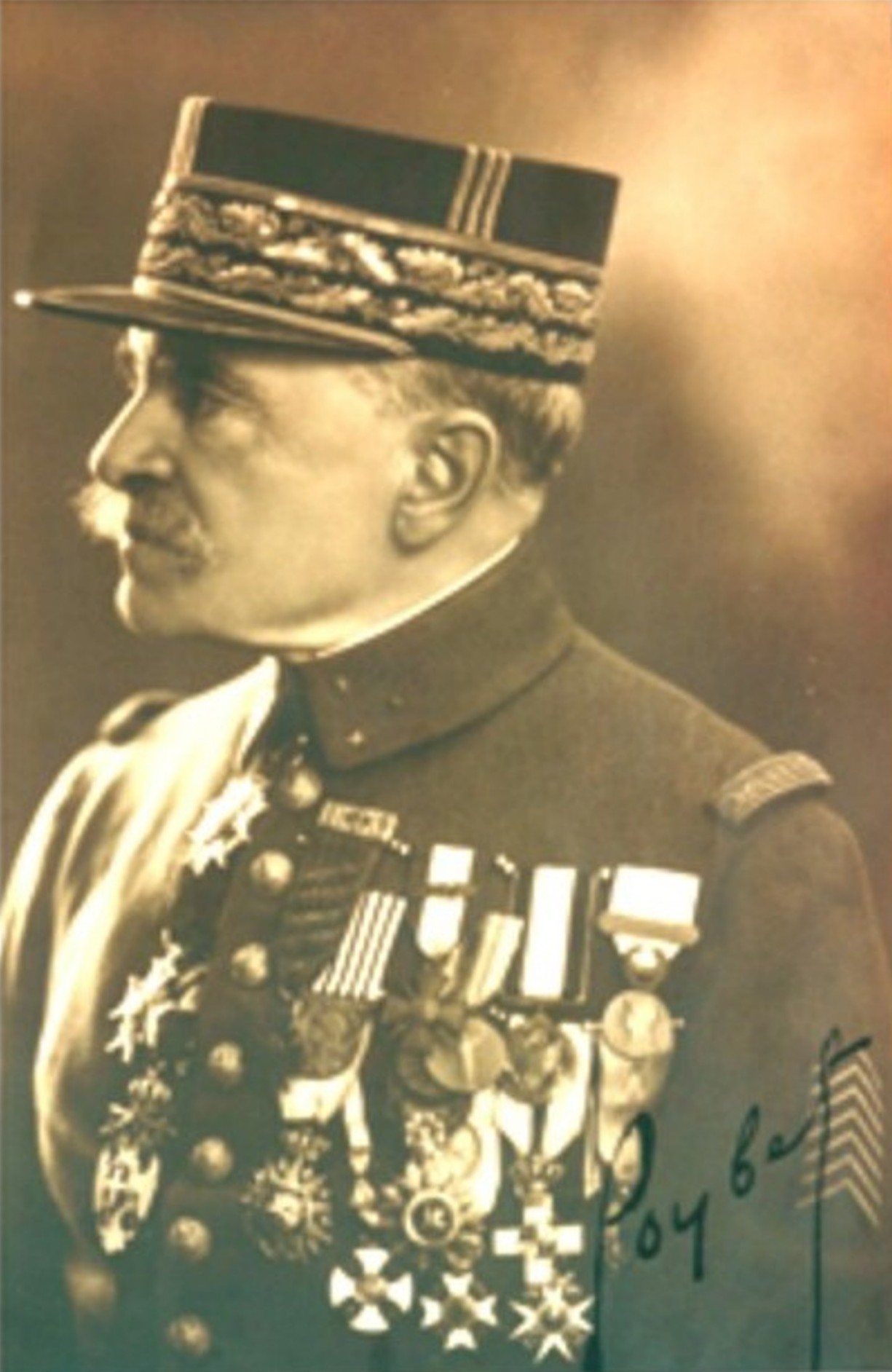
Mariano Goybet

Général Mariano Goybet commanding 157 th Red Hand Division received the Distinguished Service Medal (U.S. Army) (1924).

== Order of battle ==
=== First World War ===
- 213th Infantry Regiment from March to November 1916
- 214th Infantry Regiment from March 1917 to June 1918 (dissolution)
- 252nd Infantry Regiment from March 1917 to June 1918 (dissolution)
- 333rd Infantry Regiment from March 1917 to 20th december 1918
- 401st Infantry Regiment from April 1915 to August 1916
- 402nd Infantry Regiment from April 1915 to August 1916
- 32nd Alpine Hunters Battalion from April 1915 to August 1916
- 102nd Alpine Hunters Battalion from April 1915 to March 1916
- 107th Battalion of Alpine Hunters from April 1915 to August 1916
- 116th Alpine Hunters Battalion from April 1915 to March 1916
- 53rd Territorial Infantry Regiment from March 1916 to ????
- 70th territorial infantry regiment from August to November 1918
- 99th Territorial Infantry Regiment from March to November 1916
- 133rd Territorial Infantry Regiment from March 1916 to ????
- 371st Infantry Regiment (United States) and 372nd Infantry Regiment (United States) (both from 93rd Infantry Division (United States)) from June to 20th December 1918

==== 1915 ====
April 28 – September 23

- Established at the Camp of la Valbonne; stayed briefly and received instruction.
- From September 1, transported by rail in the area of Liancourt; rest, instruction.
- From September 25, transported by rail in the areas of Châlons-sur-Marne, Saint-Hilaire-au-Temple.

September 27 – October 10

- Moved towards Saint-Hilaire-le-Grand.
- September 8–30 : entered into the Second Battle of Champagne: French assaults north of the Wacques farm.
- From September 30, held ready to intervene, towards Wacques farm.

October 10, 1915 – January 18, 1916

- Withdrawal from the front and transported by rail in the area of Belfort; rest.
- From October 29, rested and went towards Montbéliard and Héricourt.
- From December 26, worked on defensive organization while going towards Delle and Saint-Hippolyte.

==== 1916 ====
January 18 – May 30

- Regrouped in the area of Delle, Montbéliard, then moved towards Dannemarie.
- From January 27, occupation of an area near Carlspach and Burnhaupt-le-Bas

May 30, 1916 - March 19, 1917

- Occupation of a new area, further north, between Leimbach and the Rhone–Rhine Canal, forced to the right, December 1, until near Ammerzwiller.

==== 1917 ====
March 19 – April 9

- Withdrawal from the front, moved towards Arches, through Mélisey, le Thillot and Rupt.
- From March 23, rest and instruction at the camp of Arches.

April 9 – June 16

- Moved towards the area of Belfort, through Remiremont, le Thillot and Montreux-Château; occupation of an area between the Swiss border and the Rhone-Rhine Canal.

June 16 – July 6

- Withdrawal from the battle; transported by rail from Belfort, to the area of Épernay; rest and instruction.

July 6 – November 20

- Moved towards Reims, and, from July 9, occupation of an area between Courcy and Loivre.

November 20 – December 9

- Withdrawal from the front; rested near Damery.

December 9, 1917 – May 21, 1918

- Occupation of an area between Courcy and southern Godat, spread out to the right, March 31, 1918, until near Cavaliers de Courcy.

==== 1918 ====
May 21–27

- Withdrawal from the front; moved in stages towards the area of Fismes; rest et instruction, then moved toward the front.

May 27 – June 4

- 27 May 1918 : Second Battle of the Marne
- Entered into the Third Battle of the Aisne: resistance between Saint-Mard and Maizy by the German advancement, then withdrawal towards the Marne River; occupation of points of passage of this river, between Chézy and La Ferté-sous-Jouarre.

June 4–10

- Moved in stages towards Villenauxe; rest and instruction.

June 10 – July 13

- Transported in trucks to the area of Clermont-en-Argonne, then occupation of an area between l'Aire and the woods of Avocourt.

July 13–16

- Withdrawal from the front; rested near the farm of Grange-le-Comte.

July 16 - September 14

- Occupation of an area near the woods of Avocourt and west of Forges, spread out to the left, July 20, until the bridge of Quatre Enfants.

September 14–26

- Withdrawal from the front; moved in stages towards Vanault-les-Dames and Possesse; rested in the area of Valmy.

September 26 – October 8

- Moved towards the front.
- Entered, from September 28, on the banks of la Dormoise, into the Battle of Somme-Py (Battle of Champagne and Argonne): advanced until Monthois and Challerange.

October 8 – November 11

- Withdrawal from the front and rested near Valmy.
- From October 11, transported by rail towards Bruyères.
- From October 13, occupation of an area between the high valley of la Weiss and la Fave.

==== Annexations ====
- Cut off from April 1915 to March 1916
- 34th Army Corps, from March 1916 to November 1918

Second Army

June 10 – September 14, 1918

Fourth Army

September 26 – October 11, 1915
June 8–10, 1918
September 14 - October 11, 1918

Fifth Army

June 18, 1917 – March 29, 1918

Sixth Army

September 1–26, 1915
March 29 – June 8, 1918

Seventh Army

October 11, 1915 – June 18, 1917
October 11 – November 11, 1918

== Citation for the men of 157th Division ==
The following order was issued to the 157th Division following the campaign in the Champagne region:

P. C. October 8, 1918.

"157th Division.

"Staff.

General Order No. 234

In transmitting to you with legitimate pride the thanks and congratulations of the General Garnier-Duplessis, allow me, my dear friends of all ranks, Americans and French, to thank you from the bottom of my heart as a chief and a soldier for the expression of gratitude for the glory which you have lent our good 157th Division. I had full confidence in you but you have surpassed my hopes.

During these nine days of hard fighting you have progressed nine kilometers through powerful organized defenses, taken nearly 600 prisoners, 15 guns of different calibres, 20 minenwerfers, and nearly 150 machine guns, secured an enormous amount of engineering material, an important supply of artillery ammunition, brought down by your fire three enemy aeroplanes.

"THE RED HAND", sign of the Division, thanks to you, became a bloody hand which took the Boche by the throat and made him cry for mercy. You have well avenged our glorious dead."

Signed General Goybet
