= Edward Dugger =

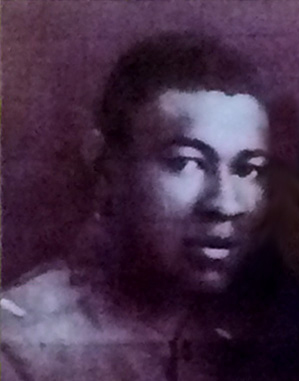
- Dugger circa 1917

Personal details
- Born: Edward Dugger; June 6, 1894 Finchley, Virginia, U.S.
- Died: March 5, 1939 (aged 44) Chelsea, Massachusetts, U.S.
- Cause of death: Polycystic kidney disease
- Spouse: Madeline Mabray Kountze (m. 1917)
- Awards: Distinction for Bravery

Military service
- Allegiance: United States of America
- Branch/service: United States Army
- Years of service: 1914–1936
- Rank: Lieutenant Colonel
- Unit: 367th Infantry Regiment
- Commands: Captain of Company L of the 367th Infantry
- Battles/wars: World War I

Edward Dugger (June 6, 1894 – March 5, 1939) was a military commander and prominent African American citizen in Medford, Massachusetts. During his career, he served in World War I, commanded Company K of the 372nd Infantry Regiment ultimately rising to the rank of lieutenant colonel. He was President of the West Medford Men's Community Club and Chair of the Citizen's Committee bringing Boy Scouts Troop No. 11 to the area. Dugger was the first African American to be appointed to the Medford City Planning Board and to have a Medford public park named after him, "Dugger Park." Dugger died in 1939.

== Early life and education ==
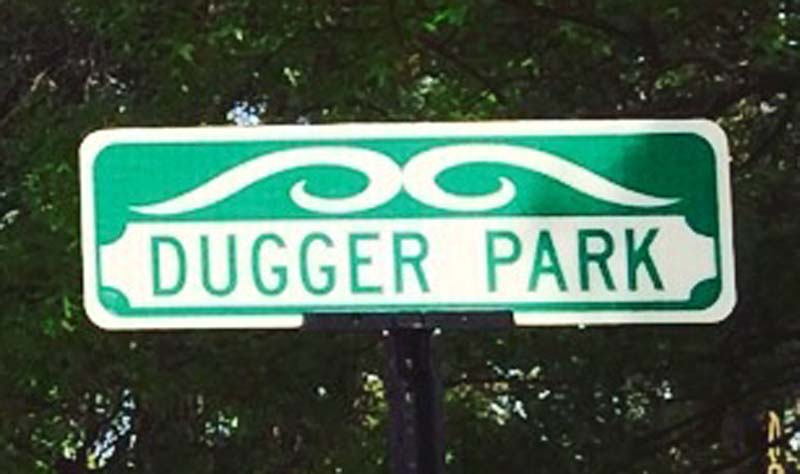
Dugger Park Sign Medford Massachusetts USA

The youngest of 8 children, Dugger was born in Finchley, Virginia, on June 6, 1894, to William (a former slave) and Mary Jane Hepburn Dugger. As a young boy he moved with his family to Natick, Massachusetts, where he received his elementary education and was a member of the Boys' Patrol. Dugger's family eventually moved to Boston and he attended Boston English High. During his high school years, he was a track star and a member of his school's military regiment. Upon graduation in 1914, Dugger signed up for the National Guard and later enlisted in the famous Company L of the 6th Massachusetts Infantry. He was commissioned first lieutenant on October 14, 1917 at Fort Des Moines, and weeks later married a West Medford native, Madeline Mabray Kountze.

== Military career ==
In June 1918, Dugger began his duty overseas. The British had been training American soldiers as they arrived but refused to train the 92nd and 93rd Divisions. To avoid trouble, the United States turned these men over to the French Army, who had been requesting extra troops. In addition to racism, the men faced the many maladies of war. Dugger's son, Cortland, recounts:

They slept in the trenches... Everything they did — they ate, they did, they fought in the trenches... in rain, sleet, whatever else, cold weather. It was an awful war... You know they were gassed, their clothing wasn't adequate, they had a whole host of diseases over the place.

== Local service ==
Dugger won distinction for bravery and returned home in March 1919. He joined the Boston Police Force and later the Postal Service, where he worked until his retirement fifteen years later. Edward and Madeline had six children between 1919 and 1930, and had a house built on Jerome Street in West Medford for their big family. During this time period, Dugger had been commissioned a major and made captain of Company K of the 372nd Infantry Regiment. He became the commanding officer in December 1930 and devoted much of his energy to the unit until his retirement in 1936.

At home and in the community, Dugger served as a model of duty and leadership. He was President of the West Medford Men's Community Club and Chair of the Citizen's Committee that brought Boy Scouts Troop No. 11 to the area. In 1936, he was appointed the first black member of the Medford City Planning Board by Mayor Irwin. However he would serve for only two years due to illness.

== Illness and death ==
Between 1936 and 1938, Dugger retired from all these positions. He had been sick with polycystic kidneys for many years and found his health failing. On March 5, 1939, Dugger died in the U.S. Naval Hospital Chelsea, Massachusetts, at the age of 44.

== Dugger Park dedication and remembrance ==
On September 10, 1939, for the first time in its history, the City of Medford honored an African American citizen in naming a public park after him. Called the "Dugger Park", the area along the Mystic River at Harvard Avenue has grown to include tennis and basketball courts, a baseball field, and a playground. Attorney Matthew Bullock remarked at the dedication that the park was "destined to be a large factor in moulding the lives of the children of this community." And indeed it was. The park plays host to myriad community events and a sign post at the intersection of Harvard Avenue and Mystic River Road boasts graffiti letting passersby know that local children consider it: "The Action Plase [sic]" .

In addition to Dugger Park, the Medford Public Library, has an exhibit about Dugger under "Leaders in the Military."

== Gallery ==
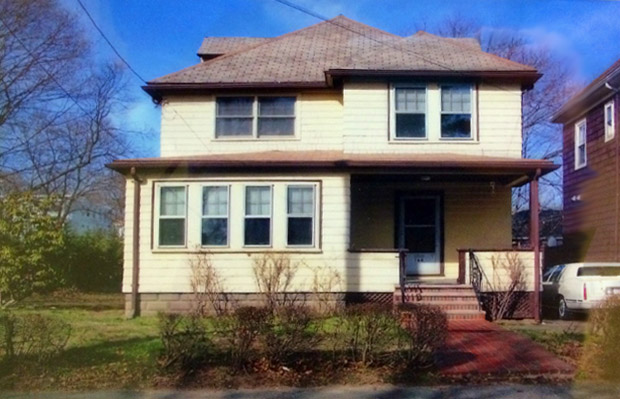
Home of Edward Dugger 164 Jerome Street Medford Massachusetts

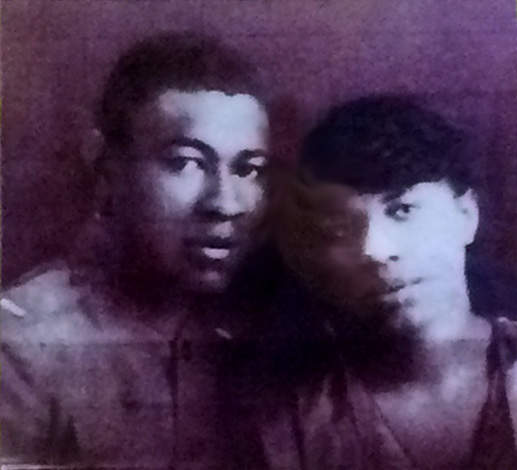
Lieutenant Colonel Edward Dugger and Wife Madeline circa 1917

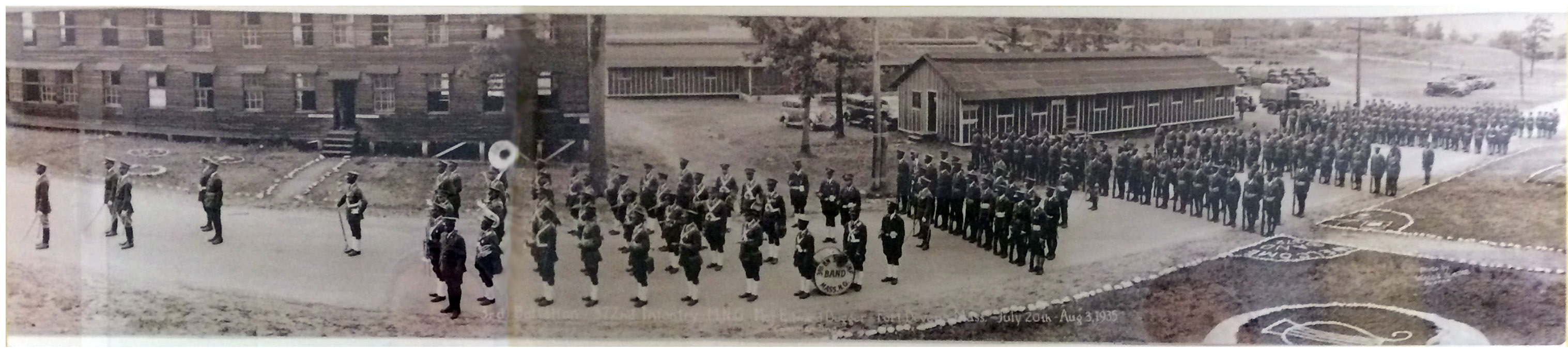
3rd battalion 372nd infantry 1935 Massachusetts National Guard

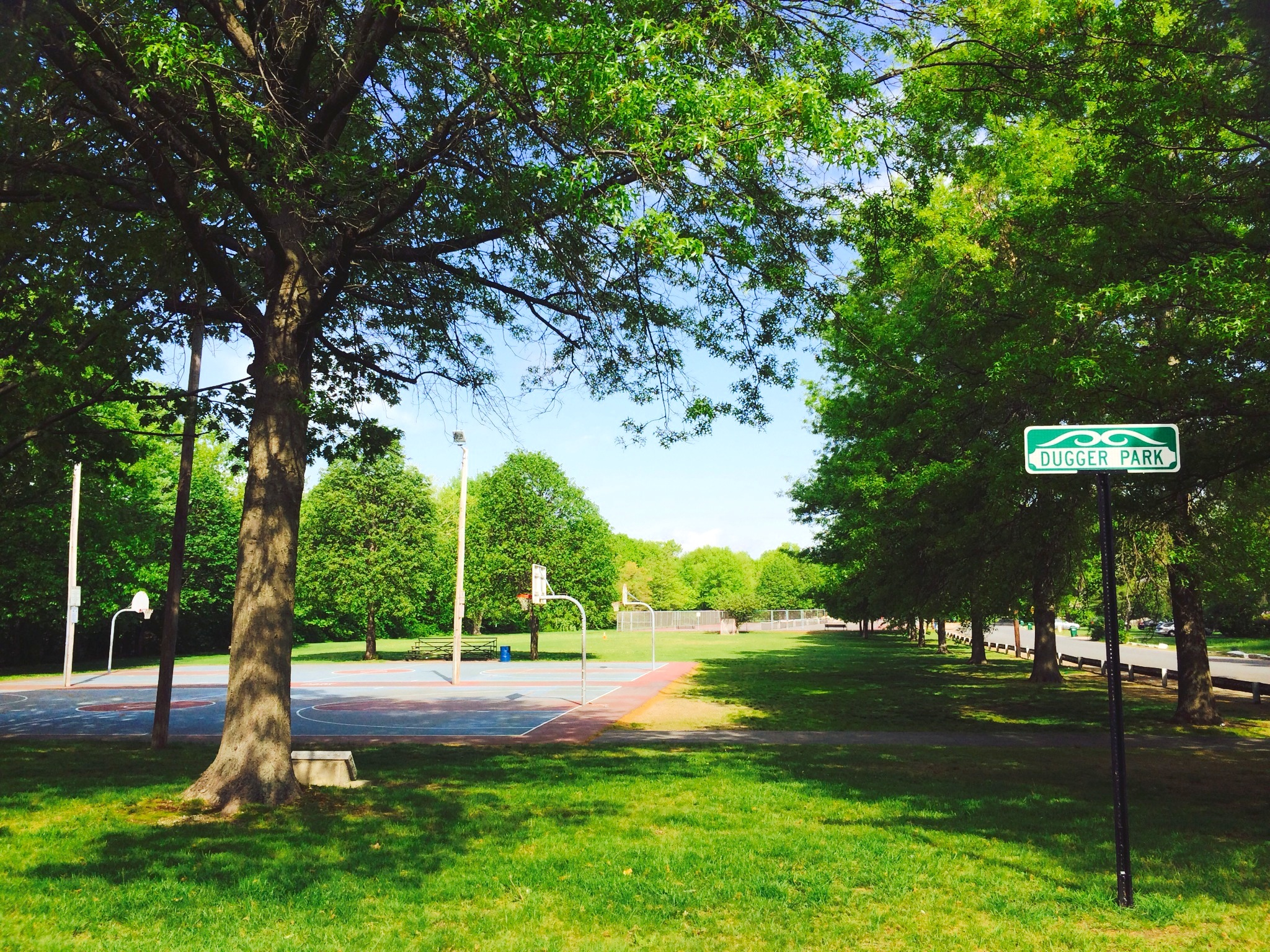
West facing view of northeast corner of Dugger Park Medford Massachusetts USA
