= Urbane F. Bass =

U.S. Army doctor

Dr. Urbane Francis Bass
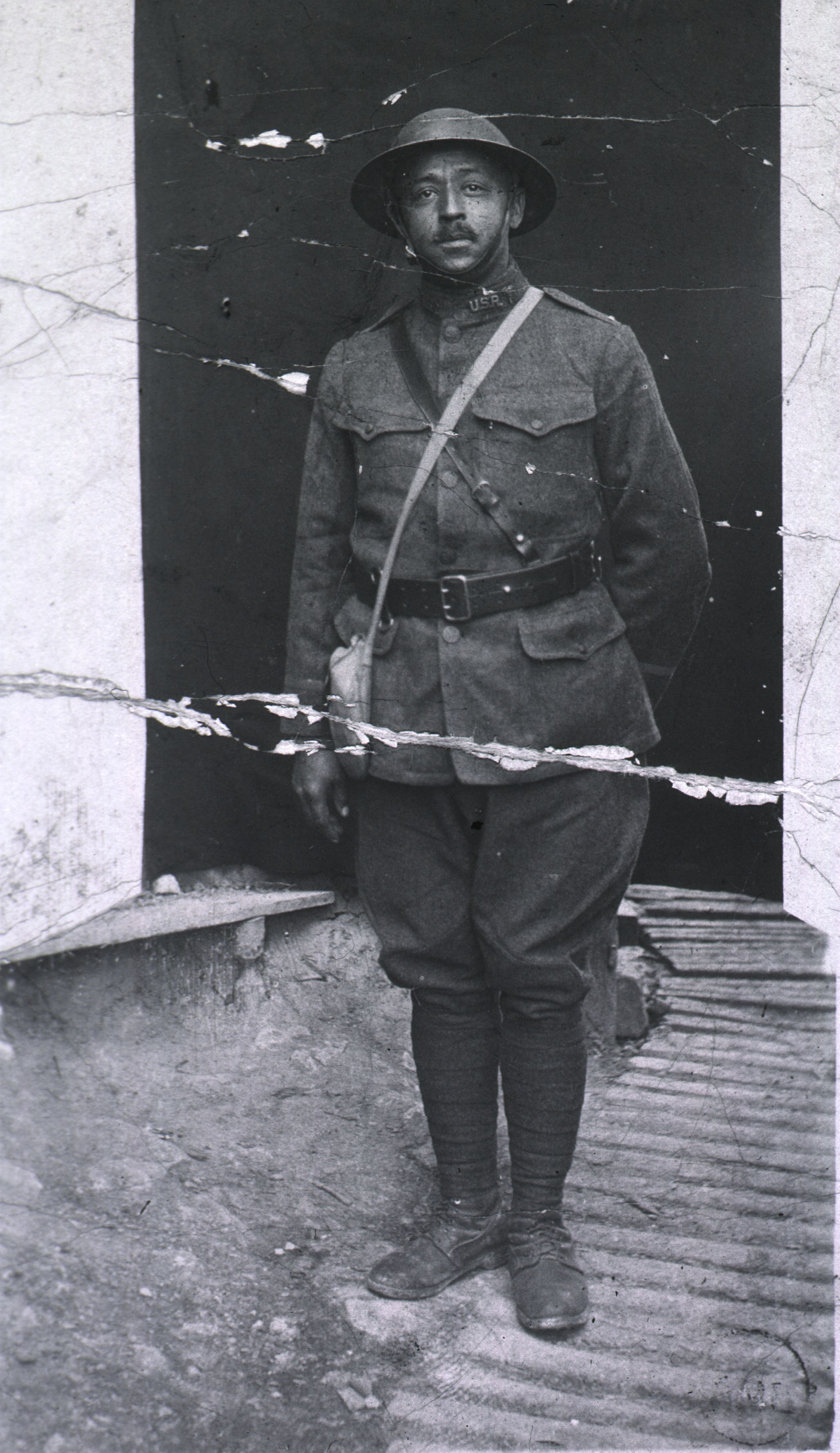
- Born: April 14, 1880; Richmond, Virginia, U.S.
- Died: October 6, 1918 (aged 38) near Monthois, France
- Burial place: Fredericksburg National Cemetery
- Military career
- Branch: United States Army
- Service years: 1917–1918
- Rank: First Lieutenant
- Unit: 372nd Infantry Regiment of the 93rd Infantry Division
- Awards: Distinguished Service Cross

Urbane Francis Bass (April 4, 1880 – October 6, 1918) was an African-American medical doctor and first lieutenant in the United States Army who was posthumously awarded the Distinguished Service Cross for his actions during the first World War.

== Early life ==
Bass was born on April 4, 1880, in Richmond, Virginia to Rosa and Richard J. Bass. His father was a salesman, alternating from shoes and clothing in the 1880s, to insurance in the 1900s. The couple had six children and lived on East Duval St. in Richmond. While in school, Bass worked as a clerk. He graduated from Virginia Union University in 1902 and the Leonard Medical School of Shaw University in 1906. After leaving Leonard, Bass began a medical practice in Richmond but by 1909 had moved to Fredericksburg where he opened a larger practice and pharmacy on Amelia Street. Bass became the first African American physician since the Reconstruction to reside in the city and his practice was well received by the African American community despite the lack of privileges given by the local hospital. By 1916, Bass was married and father of four and was settled for some time in Hampton, Virginia.

== Military career ==
In 1916, Bass wrote to Secretary of War Newton Baker, offering his services as a doctor for the armed forces. In the letter he dictated,

"I am herewith offering my services for the Army Medical Corps should there be need for a Negro Physicican for that branch of Service.

Dr. Urbane Bass Fredericksberg Physician".

Bass received a commission as a First Lieutenant in the Medical Reserve Corps and reported for duty at Fort Des Moines on August 14, 1917. Fort Des Moines opened for training African-American men as there had been a huge influx of African-American volunteers and a petition was erected by the students of Howard University. However, there was still some discontent at the facility as many soldiers found that he had been unfairly assessed for merely being black. After receiving basic medical officer training, Bass was transferred to Camp Funston. On March 30, 1918, Bass departed from Newport News, Virginia for France aboard the USS Susquehanna, with the 372nd Infantry Regiment of the 93rd Infantry Division.

By September 1918, the 372nd and 369th Infantry was responsible for the defenses of Bellenvue Signal Ridge, and assisted the French legions in trying to fend off the German assaults coming from the trenches not far from them. Most of Bass' work was done in the front lines in the various aid stations dealing with immediate injuries.

== Death and legacy ==
On October 6, 1918, Monthois, France was facing heavy artillery fire from the Germans, leaving many wounded in the process. Bass went into the line so he could provide immediate aid to the wounded when a shell exploded in the forward aid station he had been working in. The explosion severed both of Bass’s legs above the knees, and he died in minutes from shock and blood loss. He was posthumously awarded the Distinguished Service Cross on July 9, 1918, for administering "first aid in the open under prolonged and intense shell fire until he was severely wounded and carried from the field."

His body was initially buried at the La Cheppe Cemetery, Marne, France on October 7, 1918. However, a "Report of Disinterment and Reburial" note one of his legs was missing below his knee and a number of his body parts were missing. Finally, Dr. Urbane Francis Bass' remains were returned home and reburied in Fredericksburg National Cemetery on July 23, 1921, making him the first African-American officer to be interred there. In 1920, the Shiloh Baptist Church in Fredericksburg installed a large stained glass window incorporating Bass' image in honor of his heroism. The National Medical Association acknowledged Dr. Bass's contributions and service in their 1919 issue. In 1991, the Rebel Bowl Building in Fredericksburg was renamed the Bass-Ellison Social Services Building, in honor of Bass and his fellow Fredericksburg citizen Dr. Richard C. Ellison.

== Personal life ==
Dr. Bass married Maude Vass and the couple had four children, three daughters and one son. His son, Urbane Bass Jr. was born on February 10, 1910. He became a physician and relocated his family to Los Angeles, California, after his family's house on Cairo, IL was bombed by opponents of school integration. He died on March 5, 1996, and was buried in California. According to an article, Maude never remarried in the nearly 70 years she was a widow. She lived to be 100 years old and was buried next to her husband in Officer's Row in Fredericksburg.
