= Attorney General Fleming =

Attorney General Fleming may refer to:

- Francis Fleming (colonial administrator) (1842–1922), Attorney General of Ceylon
- Ted Flemming (politician) (born 1954), Attorney General of New Brunswick
- Valentine Fleming (judge) (1809–1884), Attorney-General of Tasmania

== See also ==
- General Fleming (disambiguation)
