= Mariano Goybet =

French Army general

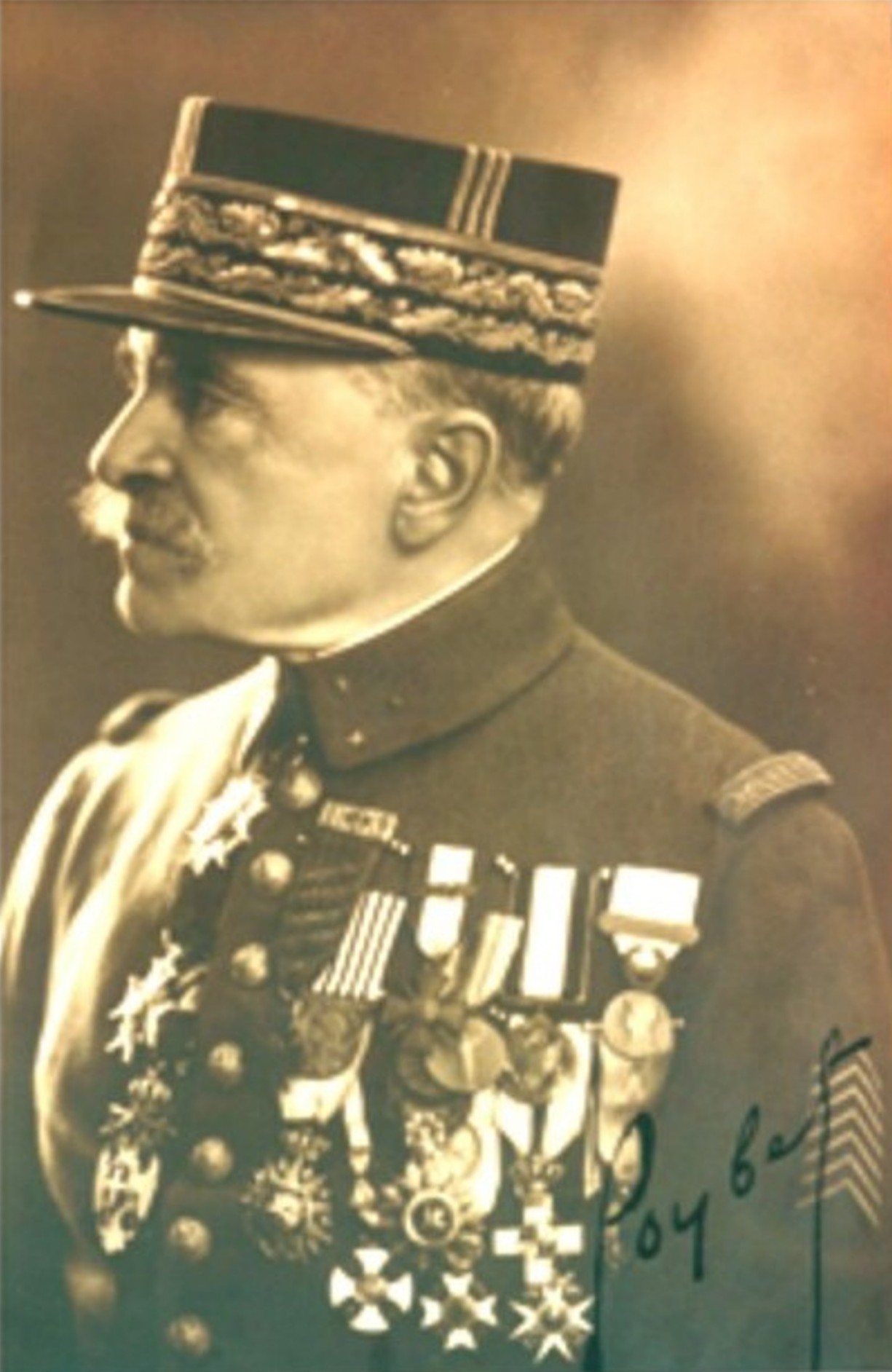
- Mariano Goybet
- Born: Mariano Francisco Julio Goybet; 17 August 1861; Zaragoza, Spain
- Died: 29 September 1943 (aged 82); Yenne, Occupied France
- Military career
- Allegiance: France
- Branch: French Army
- Service years: 1882–1923
- Rank: General de division
- Conflicts: World War I Franco-Syrian War
- Awards: Grand Officer of the Légion d'honneur Croix de guerre 1914-1918; Distinguished Service Medal (United States)

Mariano Francisco Julio Goybet (17 August 1861 – 29 September 1943) was a French Army general, who held several commands in World War I.

== Family ==
His family is an old family from Savoy in France. Its members were notaries, merchants, mayors, captains of the castel, military and industrial people. An extinct branch called Goybet de Lutrin de Grilly was ennobled in the 18th century and gave in 1753 a governor of the provinces of Chablais and Genevois. The coat of arms of this extinct branch was a blue field with three silver stars at the head and an upturned crescent at the point. Traversing the centre is a bar of gold.

Mariano Goybet was born in Zaragoza, Spain. He was the son of Pierre Jules Goybet (1823–1912), an industrialist and Marie Bravais, niece of the physicist Auguste Bravais. One of his grandmothers was Louise de Montgolfier, niece of the Montgolfier Brothers, inventors of the hot air balloon.

== Before the war ==
He studied at the college in Lyon, then at the military school École Spéciale Militaire de Saint-Cyr and was promoted to second lieutenant in 1884.

He served in the 2nd Regiment of Tirailleurs Algériens, where he married Marguerite Lespieau, daughter of his commanding officer, general Theodore Lespieau. He was promoted to lieutenant in the 140th Regiment of Infantry, stationed in Grenoble, and then attended L'Ecole de Guerre (the War College), graduating with honours in 1892.

He served on the staff of the 27th Infantry Division, was promoted to captain in 1893 and was appointed as orderly officer to general Charles Zédé, governor of Lyon, in 1896. He commanded a company of the 99th Regiment of Infantry then, following another staff appointment, he was made battalion chief of the 159th Regiment of Infantry.

In 1907 he took command of the 30th Battalion of Chasseurs Alpins as lieutenant-colonel. He was still in command of this battalion when he was promoted to colonel.

== World War I (1914–1918) ==
At the beginning of World War I he was assigned to the Vosges front with his Alpine battalion. He was placed at the head of the 152nd infantry regiment then he took command of the 81st Brigade and his troops took Steinbach in Alsace.

Wounded twice at Hartmannswillerskopf. Afterwards, he joined the 98th Infantry Regiment at the Verdun front. In autumn his division was transported north to the Battle of the Somme. He commanded the 50th Brigade.

In the beginning of 1917 he took command of the 25th Infantry Division and, as the enemy retreated, his division pursued them to the city of Saint-Quentin. In August his men seized the woods of Avocourt after heavy fighting. In December, he was promoted to general.

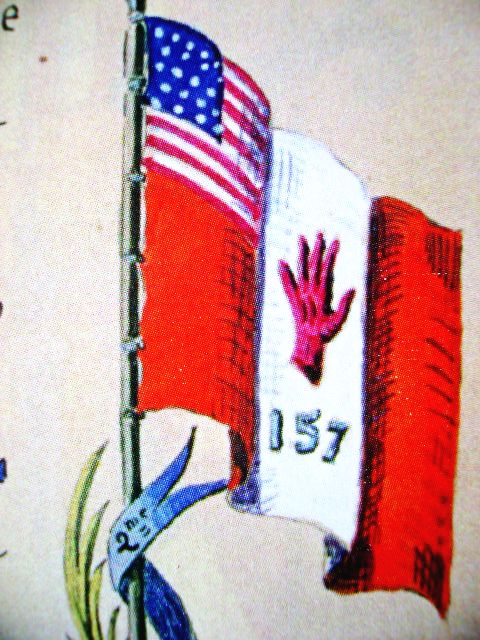
Red Hand Division

In May 1918, General Goybet commanded the 157th Division, which had been decimated after the Chemin des Dames. It was reconstituted by putting together the 333rd Infantry Regiment (French) with the American 371st and the 372nd American Regiments.

The 157th Division participated in the Meuse-Argonne Offensive. With violent attacks, General Goybet broke the enemy front at Monthois, taking many prisoners and considerable materiel. After that he occupied the Vosges at the front of Sainte Marie les Mines.

He gave his military honour to his troops. He was awarded the Distinguished Service Medal awarded by General Pershing and was awarded the Order of the Army by Marechal Philippe Pétain on March 19, 1919

== 1920 Syria ==
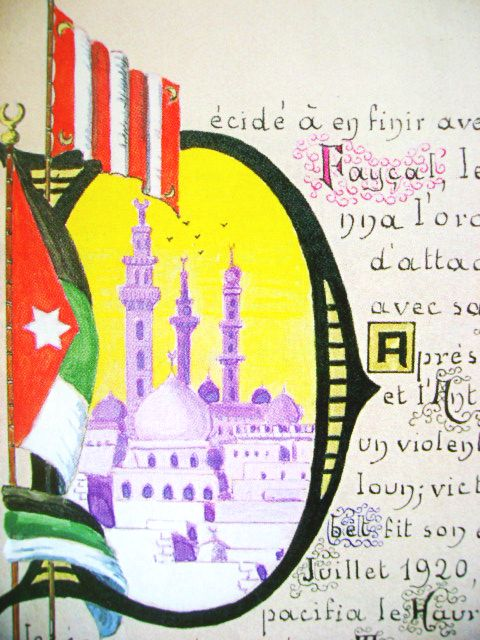
Damascus July 1920

In 1920 General Goybet was called by the General Henri Gouraud to command the Third Division of the Levant. In April 1920. Lebanon and Syria became a French mandate and in July 1920, the 24th Division commanded by General Goybet advanced on Damascus. After the battle of Maysaloun, General Goybet's troops arrived in Damascus

== Later life ==
General Goybet died in Yenne, France in 1943.

== Decorations ==
- Grand Officer of the Légion d'honneur
- Croix de guerre 1914-1918 with 4 palms
- Croix de guerre des théâtres d'opérations extérieures with 1 palm
- Médaille Commémorative de la Grande Guerre
- Distinguished Service Medal (US)
- Médaille commémorative de la guerre 1914–1918
- Médaille commémorative de Syrie-Cilicie
- Insigne des blessés militaires
- Médaille Interalliée 1914–1918

== Sources ==
- Heywood, Chester D. (1928). Negro Combat Troops in the World War
- Scott, Emmet J. (1919). The American Negro in the World War
- Jaillard, Henri (genealogist and member of the family) (August 25, 1964). Les Goybet de la vallée de Yenne
