= Adrian Sebastian Fleming =

United States Army officer (1872–1940)

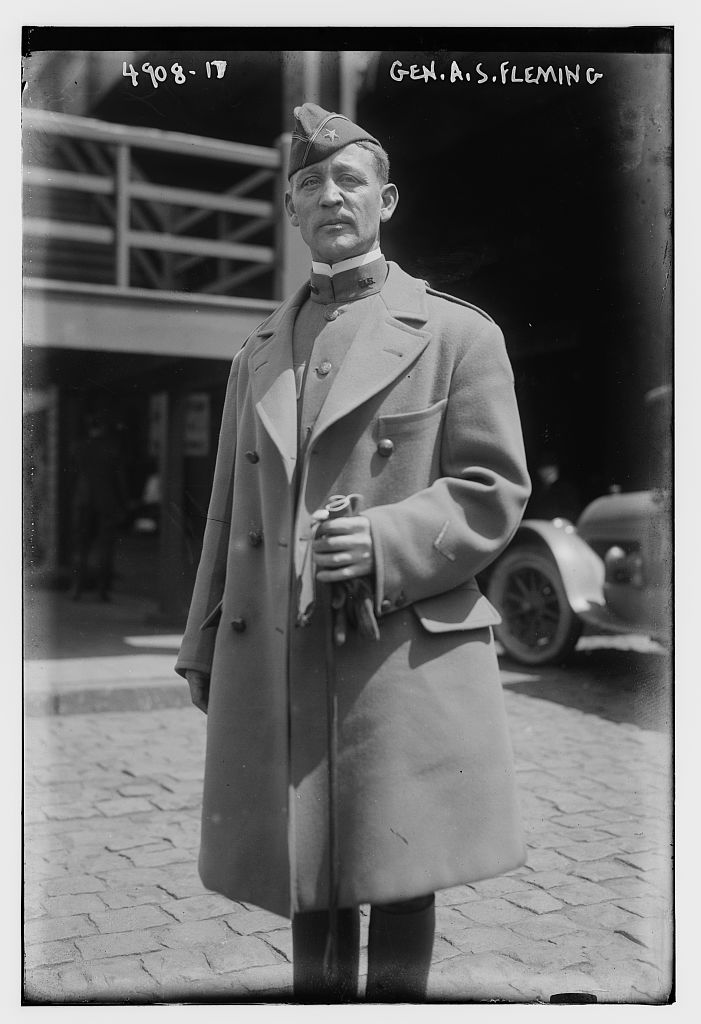
- Born: December 6, 1872; Midway, Kentucky
- Died: December 1, 1940 (aged 67); Oregon
- Spouse: Mabel V. Gassen
- Military career
- Allegiance: United States
- Branch: United States Army
- Service years: 1895–1921
- Rank: Brigadier general
- Conflicts: Philippine–American War; World War I
- Awards: Silver Star; Distinguished Service Medal; Oak leaf cluster (2); Legion of Honour

Adrian Sebastian Fleming (December 6, 1872 – December 1, 1940) was a United States Army officer in the late 19th and early 20th centuries. He served in the Philippine–American War and World War I, and he received the Distinguished Service Medal among several other awards.

== Biography ==
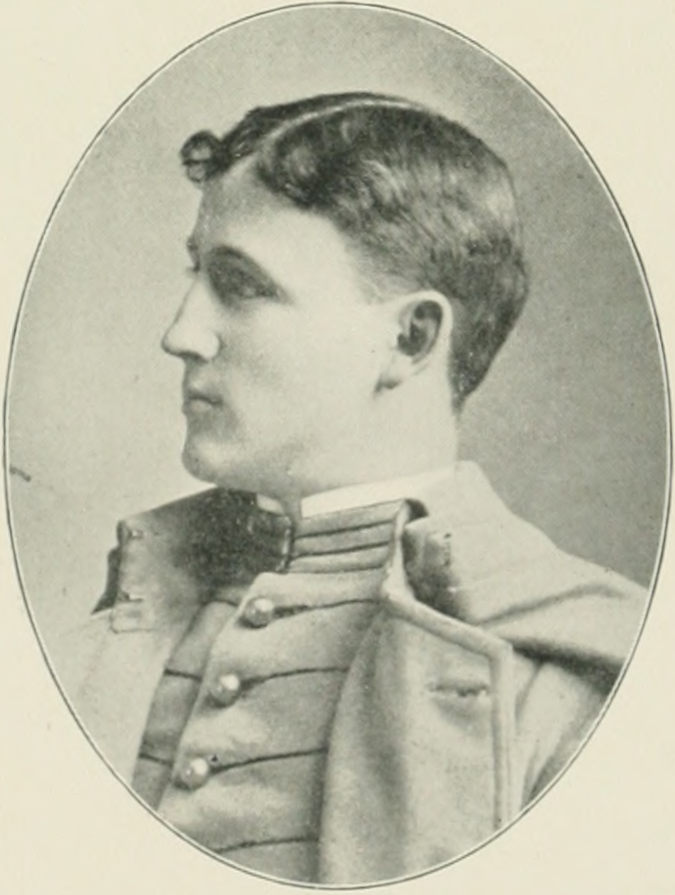
Fleming as a United States Military Academy cadet c. 1895

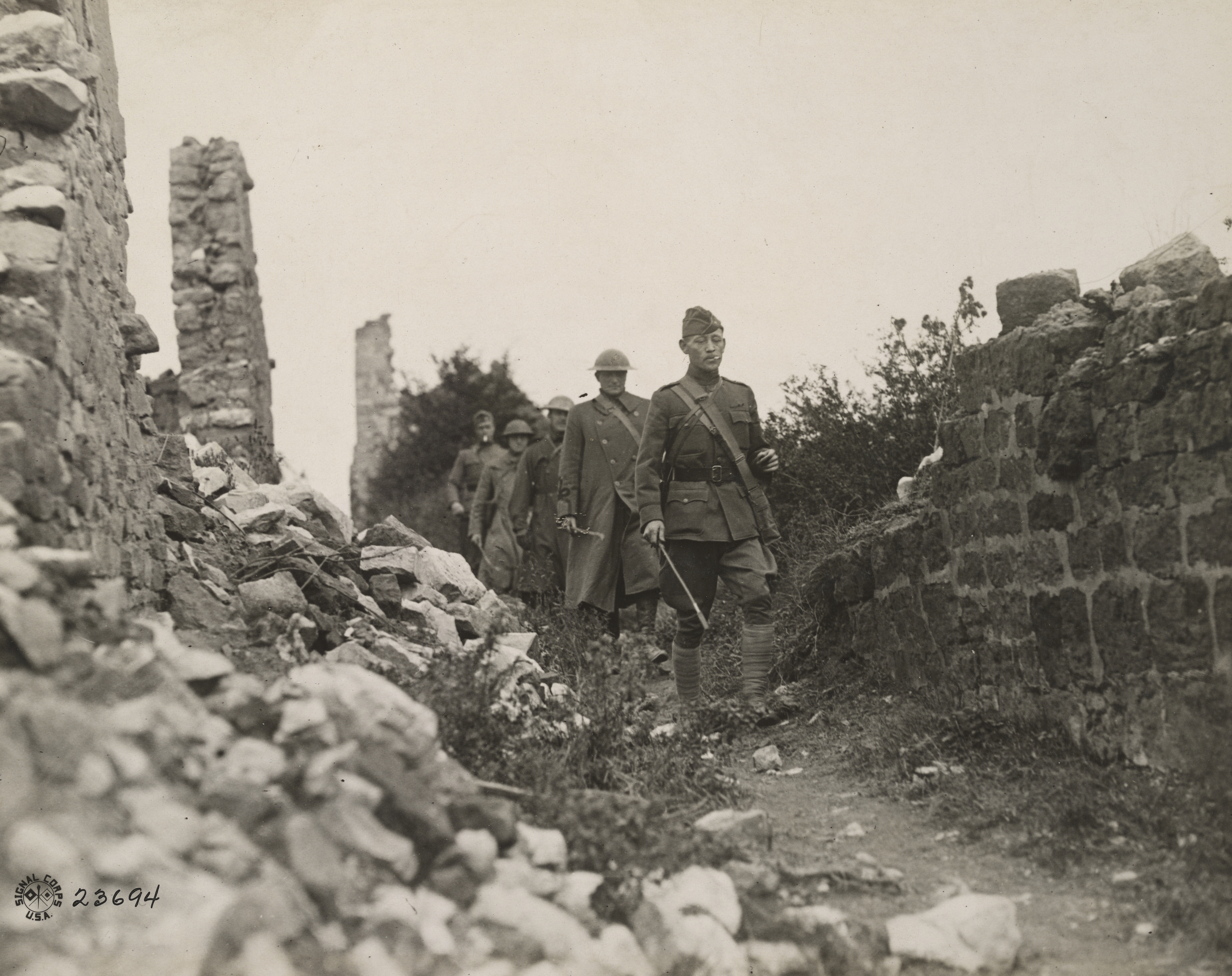
Brigadier General A. S. Fleming, leading, and Major A. J. Bulwinkle looking over the ruins of the town of Montfaucon shortly after its capture by the Americans, October 1918.

Fleming was born on December 6, 1872, in Midway, Kentucky. His family was of Scottish descent, had arrived in the Americas in the mid-1700s, and fought for the United States during the American Revolutionary War. Fleming graduated from the United States Military Academy in 1895 and was commissioned into the Fifth Artillery.

Fleming went to the Philippines in 1898 with the Sixth Artillery. He received two Silver Stars there and was wounded. After serving on recruiting duty in Lexington, Kentucky, he went to California after his promotion to captain in 1901. Fleming attended the School of Submarine Defense at Fort Totten in 1905, and be subsequently assumed command of the 15th Field Artillery Battery.

After the American entry into World War I in April 1917, Fleming served as the commandant of the Artillery School from September 26, 1917, to May 11, 1918. While he was there he received a promotion to the general officer rank of brigadier general on April 12, 1918.

After his promotion Fleming assumed command of the 158th Field Artillery Brigade, 83rd Division, at Camp Sherman, Ohio, which he took to France later that year. He participated in combat during the Meuse–Argonne offensive, and he received the Distinguished Service Medal for his efforts there, as well as two oak leaf clusters and the Legion of Honour. The citation for his Army DSM reads:

The President of the United States of America, authorized by Act of Congress, July 9, 1918, takes pleasure in presenting the Army Distinguished Service Medal to Brigadier General Adrian Sebastian Fleming, United States Army, for exceptionally meritorious and distinguished services to the Government of the United States, in a duty of great responsibility during World War I. General Fleming commanded with distinction the 158th Field Artillery Brigade, 83d Division, displaying aggressive leadership and the highest professional attainments. He contributed materially to the successful operations of the Infantry units to which his brigade was attached during the Meuse-Argonne offensive by the timely and accurate artillery support furnished by his regiments.

Fleming temporarily commanded the 32nd Infantry Division's Artillery in October 1918. In command of his own brigade again, Fleming supported the 17th French Army at the Battle of Verdun, and after rejoining the 32nd Infantry, they took part in the occupation of Germany until July 1919.

After returning to the U.S., Fleming reverted to his permanent rank of colonel. He graduated from the United States Army War College during this time, and starting on August 25, 1920, he briefly was part of the General Staff Corps in Washington, D.C. Because of physical disability, Fleming retired from the army on June 17, 1921, as a colonel, though Congress restored his brigadier general rank in 1930. During his retirement, he lived in Portland, Oregon, and served as the vice president of several paper mill companies. He died on December 1, 1940, in Oregon.

== Personal life ==
Fleming married Mabel V. Gassen on June 17, 1902. He was a Presbyterian.

== Bibliography ==
- Davis, Henry Blaine Jr. (1998). Generals in Khaki. Raleigh, North Carolina: Pentland Press. ISBN 1571970886. OCLC 40298151.
- Marquis Who's Who (1975). Who Was Who In American History – The Military. Chicago, Illinois: Marquis Who's Who. ISBN 0837932017.
