= Séchault =

- Commune
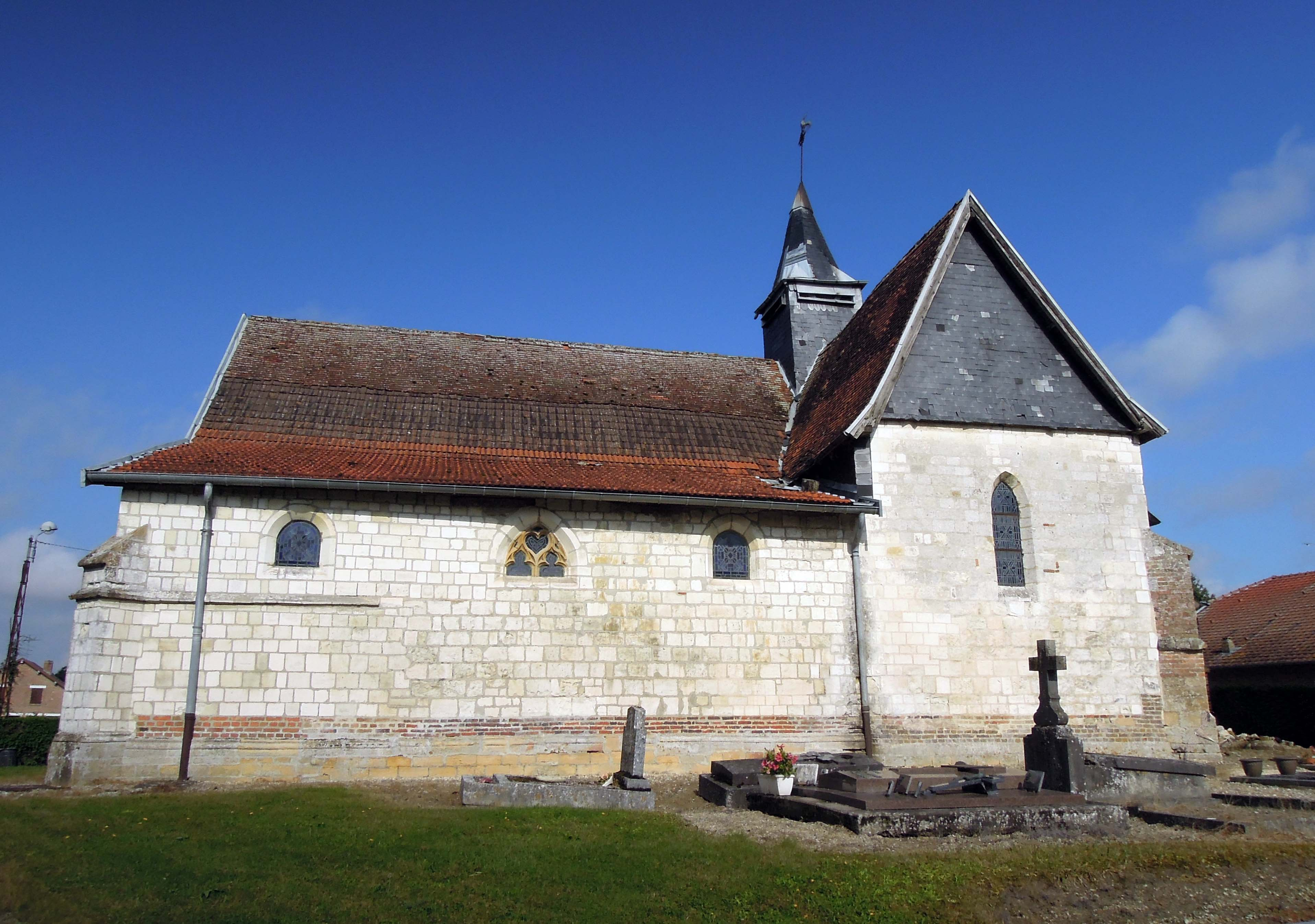
- The church in Séchault
- Location of Séchault
- Location within France Location within Grand Est
- Coordinates: 49°15′55″N 4°44′19″E
- Country: France
- Region: Grand Est
- Department: Ardennes
- Arrondissement: Vouziers
- Canton: Attigny
- Intercommunality: Argonne Ardennaise

Government
  - Mayor (2020–2026): René Salez
- Area^{1}: 10.86 km^{2} (4.19 sq mi)
- Elevation: 120 m (390 ft)
- Highest elevation: 191 m (627 ft)
- Lowest elevation: 105 m (344 ft)
- Population (2023): 59
  - Density: 5.4/km^{2} (14/sq mi)
- Time zone: UTC+01:00 (CET)
  - Summer (DST): UTC+02:00 (CEST)
- INSEE/Postal code: 08407 /08250
- ^{1} French Land Register data, which excludes lakes, ponds, glaciers > 1 km^{2} (0.386 sq mi or 247 acres) and river estuaries.

Séchault is a commune in the Ardennes department in northern France.

== Population ==
Historical population
Year	Pop.	±% p.a.
1968	77	—
1975	59	−3.73%
1982	65	+1.39%
1990	57	−1.63%
1999	59	+0.38%
2007	77	+3.38%
2012	65	−3.33%
2017	61	−1.26%
2023	59	−0.55%
Source: INSEE

== History ==
On 29 September 1918 the village was captured by the 369th Infantry Regiment.

== See also ==
- Communes of the Ardennes department
