= Monthois =

- Commune
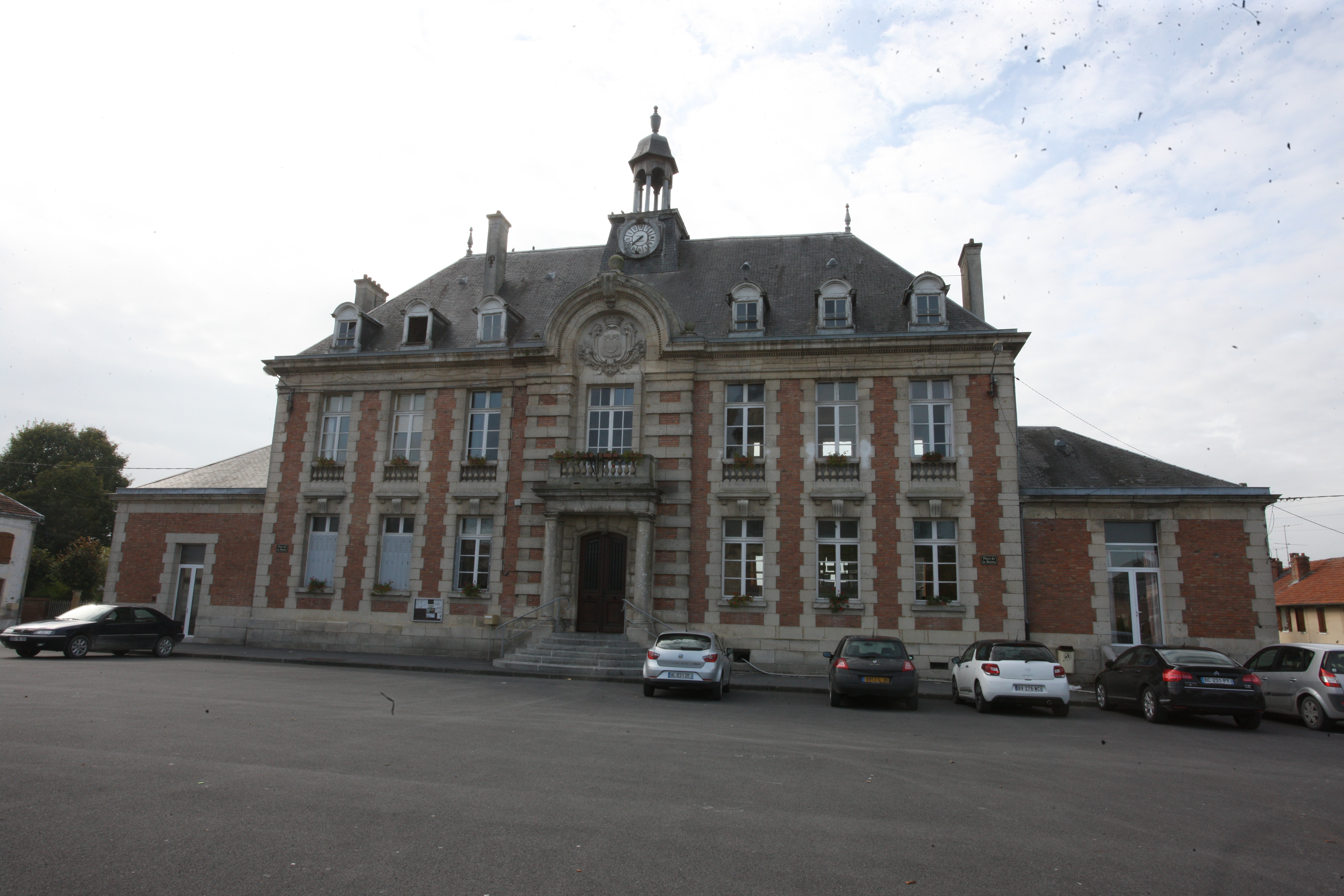
- Town hall

- Coat of arms
- Location of Monthois
- Location within France Location within Grand Est
- Coordinates: 49°18′46″N 4°42′34″E
- Country: France
- Region: Grand Est
- Department: Ardennes
- Arrondissement: Vouziers
- Canton: Attigny
- Intercommunality: Argonne Ardennaise

Government
  - Mayor (2020–2026): Vincent Fleury
- Area^{1}: 11.98 km^{2} (4.63 sq mi)
- Elevation: 109 m (358 ft)
- Population (2023): 390
  - Density: 33/km^{2} (84/sq mi)
- Time zone: UTC+01:00 (CET)
  - Summer (DST): UTC+02:00 (CEST)
- INSEE/Postal code: 08303 /08400
- ^{1} French Land Register data, which excludes lakes, ponds, glaciers > 1 km^{2} (0.386 sq mi or 247 acres) and river estuaries.

Monthois (French pronunciation: [mɔ̃twa]) is a commune in the Ardennes department in northern France.

== Population ==
Historical population
Year	Pop.	±% p.a.
1968	417	—
1975	363	−1.96%
1982	388	+0.96%
1990	376	−0.39%
1999	336	−1.24%
2007	382	+1.62%
2012	381	−0.05%
2017	374	−0.37%
2023	390	+0.70%
Source: INSEE

== Monuments ==
Monthois features a monument built to recognize the 372nd Infantry of the 93rd American Division, who fought a battle in the town in early October 1918.

== See also ==
- Communes of the Ardennes department
