= Augustus W. Corliss =

American author and military personnel

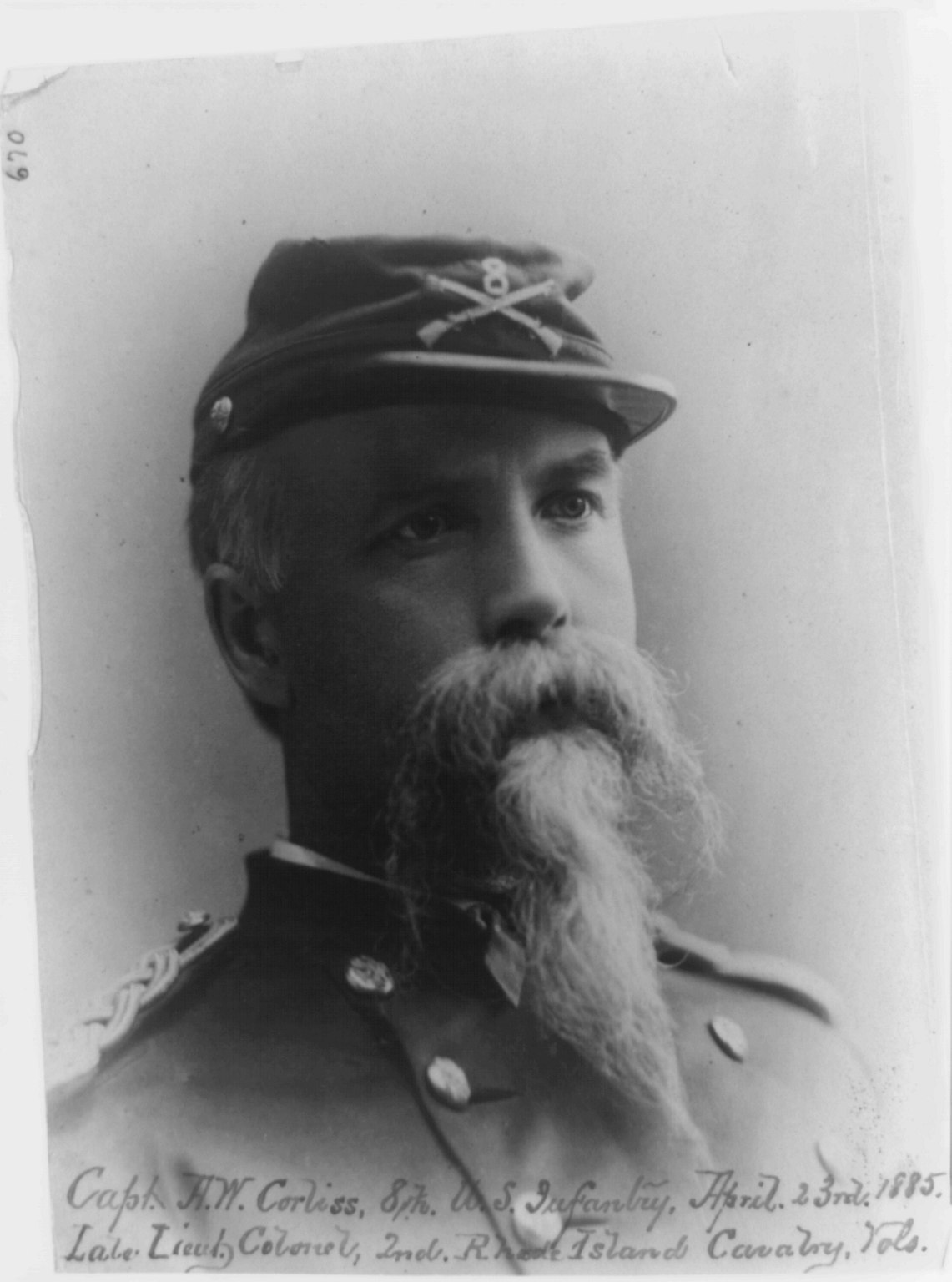
- Corliss in 1885
- Born: March 25, 1837; North Yarmouth, Maine, U.S.
- Died: September 4, 1908 (aged 71); Colorado, U.S.
- Resting place: Fairmount Cemetery, Denver, Colorado, U.S.
- Occupations: Author, historian
- Notable work: Old Times in North Yarmouth, Maine (1884)
- Spouse(s): Eliza Crawford Cunningham (1878–1890; her death); Frances T. Corliss (–1908; his death)

Augustus Whittemore Corliss (March 25, 1837 – September 4, 1908) was an American author and historian. He published, amongst other works, Old Times in North Yarmouth, Maine across several volumes. He began writing it during his career in the military, which spanned forty years.

== Early life and career ==
Corliss was born in North Yarmouth, Maine, in 1837, to Robert Elwell Corliss and Asenath Field. He graduated from North Yarmouth Academy in 1851.

In 1862, during the American Civil War, Corliss was in command of the 7th Rhode Island Cavalry Squadron, which was organized in Providence, Rhode Island. He also became lieutenant colonel of the 2nd Rhode Island Cavalry Regiment.

He later joined the United States Army as a private and received a commission in 1865 as first lieutenant of the 15th Infantry Regiment. He was promoted to a captain in the 8th Infantry Regiment in 1873.

In 1872 and 1873, he was in command of a military escort company during the Yellowstone surveys of the Northern Pacific Railway.

Corliss published the first issue of his quarterly Old Times in North Yarmouth, Maine in January 1877. Thirty-two issues were published through October 1884. He tried to revive the magazine as The Westcustogo Chronicle, but only one issue made it to print before publication stopped.

He was promoted to major of the 17th Cavalry in 1897.

Corliss was wounded at El Caney, Cuba, in 1898. After spending two years in Cienfuegos, Cuba, he was sent to the Philippines, where he conducted a scorched-earth campaign against guerrilla forces under general Maximo Abad on the island of Marinduque.

In 1901, he was promoted to lieutenant colonel, then colonel, of the 2nd Infantry Regiment. He retired in March of that year, and in recognition of his military service, a special Act of Congress appointed Corliss to the rank of brigadier general in 1904.

He became a regular correspondent with poet and women's rights activist Elizabeth Oakes Smith, a fellow native of North Yarmouth.

== Personal life ==
In 1878, Corliss married Eliza Crawford Cunningham in Phoenix, Arizona. They had two children: Robert Cunningham (born 1879) and Margaret Haynes (1881). After twelve years of marriage, Eliza died on January 11, 1890. She was buried in Fort McPherson National Cemetery in Maxwell, Nebraska. Corliss remarried, to Frances.

He was a member of the General Society of Colonial Wars, of the Sons of the American Revolution, of the Society of the War of 1812, of the Military Order of the Loyal Legion of the United States, of the Society of the Army of Santiago de Cuba and of the Society of Foreign Wars.

== Death ==
Corliss died in Denver, Colorado, in 1908, aged 71. His second wife survived him and was interred alongside him at Fairmount Cemetery in Denver upon her death.

=== Legacy ===
The life of Corliss and his family between 1869 and 1898 is documented in Denver Public Library's Augustus W. Corliss and Family Papers. It contains three handwritten diaries, plus an additional fifteen loose pages, which were kept by Corliss during his military service.

== Bibliography ==
- A Genealogical Record of the Corliss family of America (1875)
- Old Times in North Yarmouth, Maine (1877–1884)
- History of the Seventh Squadron, Rhode Island Cavalry (1879)
