= Edward Mann Lewis =

United States Army officer (1863–1949)

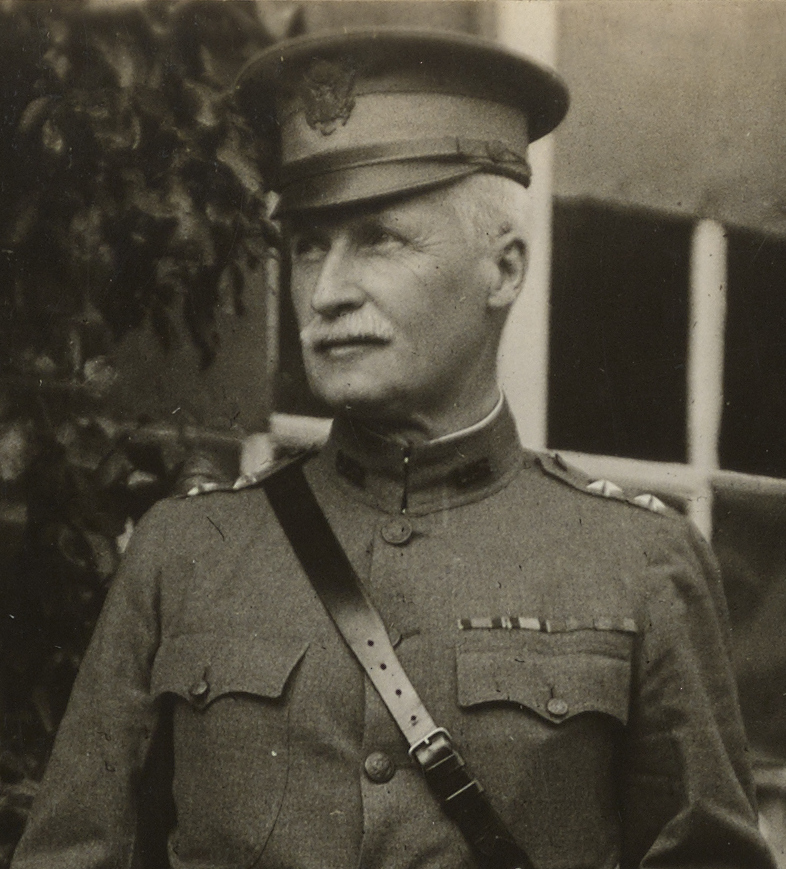
- Born: December 10, 1863; New Albany, Indiana, United States
- Died: July 27, 1949 (aged 85); Oakland, California, United States
- Burial place: San Francisco National Cemetery
- Military career
- Allegiance: United States
- Branch: United States Army
- Service years: 1881 to 1928
- Rank: Major General
- Service number: 0-55
- Commands: Fort Wood, NY Statue of Liberty; Plattsburgh, NY Old Stone Barracks; 76th Infantry Brigade; 38th Infantry Division; The Paris Military District; 3rd Brigade, 2nd Infantry Division; 30th Infantry Division; 5th Infantry Division; The Douglas Arizona District; 3rd Infantry Division; 2nd Infantry Division; 8th Corps Area; Hawaiian Division; The Hawaiian Department
- Conflicts: Spanish–American War; Vera Cruz; Moro Rebellion; World War I Fourth Battle of Ypres; Somme; Hindenburg Line; Battle of St. Quentin Canal; Bellicourt; Nauroy; Vaux; Selle River Campaign
- Awards: Distinguished Service Medal; Military Order of the Bath; Knight Commander of St. Michael and St. George – England; Commander Legion of Honor – France; Knight, Order of Leopold for Gallantry – Belgium; Officer of the Order of Leopold II with Palm – Belgium; Knight Commander, Order of Danilo – Montenegro; World War I Victory Medal with 5 Battle Clasps; Croix De Guerre – France (with 2 Palms); Croix De Guerre – Belgium (with Palm); Spanish Campaign Medal; Army of Cuban Occupation Medal; Mexican Service Medal; Philippine Campaign Medal; Society of the Army of Santiago de Cuba

Edward Mann Lewis, KCB, KCMG, (December 10, 1863 – July 27, 1949) was a highly decorated United States Army officer who served his nation for 46 years. During the First World War, he led the 30th Infantry Division when they broke the Hindenburg Line. Upon arrival in France in 1917, he was placed in command of all U.S. forces in Paris. In 1918 he led the 3rd Brigade of the 2nd Infantry Division at Château-Thierry where he was responsible for planning and leading the attack on the strategic town of Vaux. General John J. Pershing then promoted him and placed him in command of the 30th Infantry Division in July 1918. Assigned to the Fourth British Army, the 30th Division (Old Hickory) broke the Hindenburg Line on September 29, hastening the end of the Great War.

== Biography ==
The son of William Henry and Julia Frances (Snively) Lewis, Edward Mann Lewis was born December 10, 1863, in New Albany, Indiana. He entered the United States Military Academy (USMA) at West Point, New York in September 1881 and graduated seventieth in a class of seventy-seven in July 1886, a classmate of John J. Pershing. He was commissioned as a second lieutenant of Infantry and served in the Spanish–American War and the Moro Rebellion in the Philippines while assigned to the 20th Infantry Regiment.

During World War I, General Lewis was placed in charge of the Paris Military District before commanding the 3rd Brigade of the 2nd Infantry Division, and later commanded the 30th Infantry Division. Following World War I, he commanded the 8th Corps Area in Texas, then the Hawaiian Department from 1925 to 1927.

== Early life and West Point ==
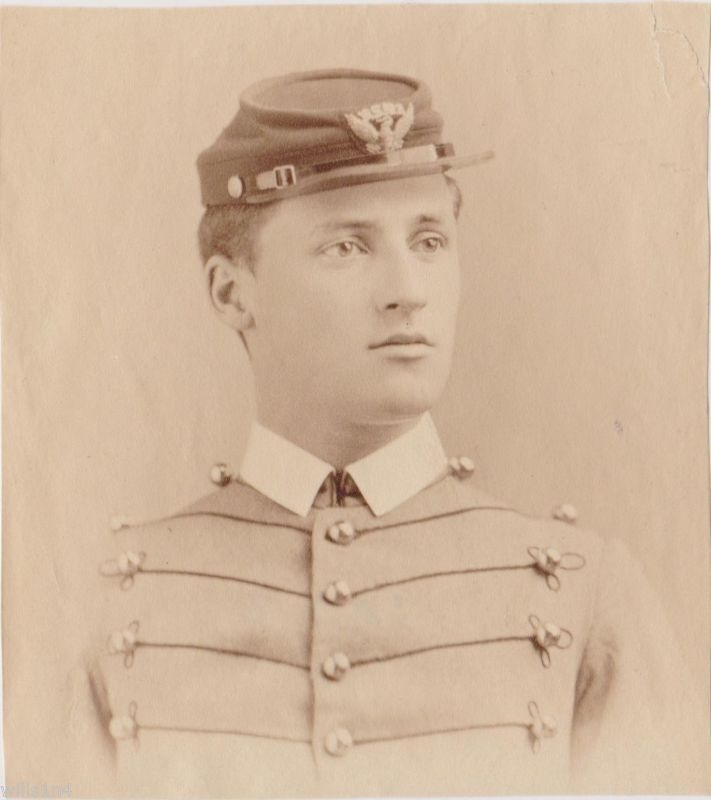
Image of Cadet Edward Mann Lewis at West Point

Edward Mann Lewis was born on December 10, 1863, alongside the river in New Albany, Indiana. His father, a railroad executive, told him stories of the Lewis family who served in the military, going back to the American Revolution. He was able to secure an appointment to West Point in 1881, where he excelled in the classroom and on the athletic field. He was made a cadet lieutenant in his first year, but ran into trouble with mathematics. His potential was recognized, however, so he was granted a "turnback" joining the class of 1886 and becoming a friend of classmate John J. Pershing. That friendship would last for over 40 years while they served together in The Philippines, San Francisco, Mexico and in Europe during the Great War. Called 'Sep' by his friends and classmates, they stood in honor when the funeral train of Ulysses S. Grant made a stop in West Point in 1885. His experiences at West Point started him down a path of lifelong service. The stories he told inspired his son Henry Balding Lewis to do the same, with the younger Lewis graduating from West Point in 1913, before becoming a major general himself in the Second World War. He graduated 70th in his class of 77 in 1886.

== Frontier duty ==
Commissioned a second lieutenant of infantry, he joined the 11th Infantry Regiment in the west, at Fort Yates in the Dakota Territory. After about a year on the border, they were shipped to Fort Wood, Liberty Island in New York harbor where the newly installed Statue of Liberty stood proud, Captain Lewis its new Commander. His son, Henry Balding Lewis a future major general and deputy chief of staff to Omar Bradley in World War II was born there, the first child born at the new hospital on the island. Packing up the family, they traveled to Fort Huachuca in the Arizona Territory for their next duty station. His attention to detail and outstanding performance led to regimental duties and post staff assignments unusual for one so young. He was then detached from his regiment, and assigned to teach Military Science at DePauw University in his home state. Being assigned to the 9th Infantry Regiment, he led his men when they were mobilized to help end the violent Pullman Strike in 1894. In an effort to conciliate organized labor after the strike, President Grover Cleveland and Congress designated Labor Day as a federal holiday later that year.

Finishing up his duties at DePauw, he was assigned to the 20th Infantry Regiment in 1896, joining them at Fort Leavenworth in Kansas. He would spend twelve years with the 'Sykes Regulars' serving as the regimental adjutant in the Spanish–American War, and the Moro War in the Philippines.

== Spanish–American War ==
During the Spanish–American War, Lewis and the 20th Infantry Regiment fought in the Cuban Campaign as part of the 2nd Division. The primary objective of the American Fifth Army Corps' invasion of Cuba was the capture of the city of Santiago de Cuba. U.S. forces had driven back the Spaniards' first line of defense at the Battle of Las Guasimas, after which General Arsenio Linares pulled his troops back to the main line of defense against Santiago along San Juan Heights. In the charge at the Battle of San Juan Hill U.S. forces captured the Spanish position. At the Battle of El Caney the same day, U.S. forces took the fortified Spanish position and were then able to extend the U.S. flank on San Juan Hill. The destruction of the Spanish fleet at the Battle of Santiago de Cuba allowed U.S. forces to safely besiege the city.

The U.S. troops met stiff resistance from a well-armed adversary at the Battle of El Caney, fought on July 1, 1898, in southeastern Cuba. The Division under General Lawton succeeded in capturing the town, fort and blockhouses and protected the right flank of the main American attack on the Heights of San Juan to the south.

The Army deployed a combined force of about 15,000 American troops in regular infantry and cavalry regiments, including all four of the army's "Colored" regiments, and volunteer regiments, among them Roosevelt and his "Rough Riders", the 71st New York, the 2nd Massachusetts Infantry, and 1st North Carolina, and rebel Cuban forces. They attacked 1,270 entrenched Spaniards in dangerous Civil War-style frontal assaults at the Battle of El Caney and Battle of San Juan Hill outside of Santiago. More than 200 U.S. soldiers were killed and close to 1,200 wounded in the fighting, thanks to the high rate of fire the Spanish were able to put down range at the Americans. Supporting fire by Gatling guns was critical to the success of the assault. Cervera decided to escape Santiago two days later.

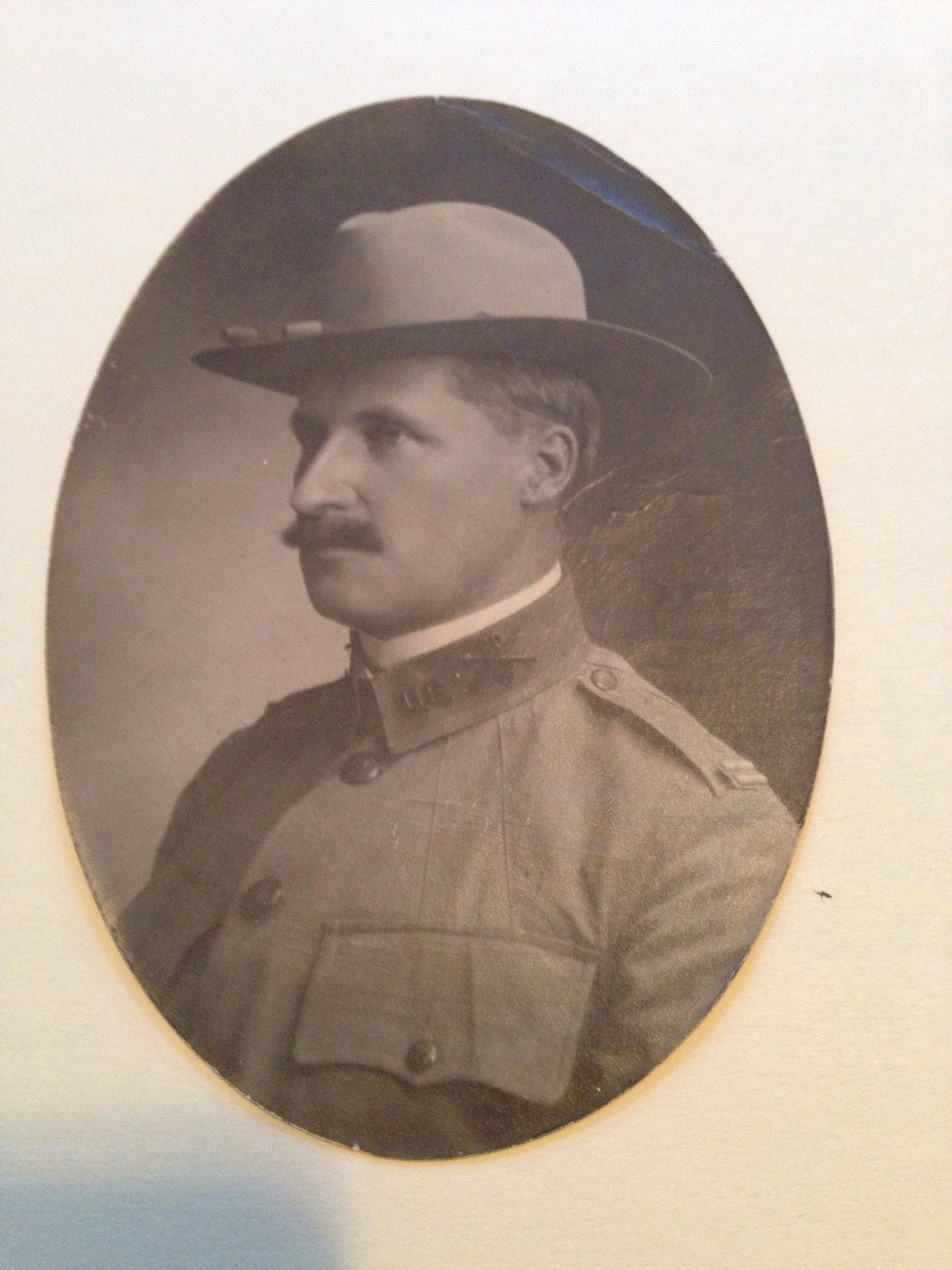
Image of Capt Lewis 1899

On July 3, 1898, the same day as the naval battle, Major General William "Pecos Bill" Shafter began the siege of Santiago. Shafter fortified his position on San Juan Heights. General Henry W. Lawton's division moved up from El Caney extending the U.S. right flank to the north. To the northwest, Cuban rebels under the command of Calixto García extended the U.S. line to the bay. General Arsenio Linares had been severely wounded at the Battle of San Juan Hill and was replaced by General José Toral y Velázquez. Toral had a good defensive position and Shafter knew he would sustain severe casualties from a frontal assault.

Lewis was cool under fire, and was cited for Gallantry at the Battle of El Caney. During the war Lewis met Teddy Roosevelt and made a lifelong friend who would later help muster troops in Indiana, as the nation prepared for the Great War.

== The Philippine–American War and Moro Rebellion ==
The Philippine–American War required that the 20th Infantry Division to ship overseas again, with Captain Lewis serving in the north of the country. Between 1899 and 1901 they opened the Pasig River and fought in many battles as a part of the campaign. Lewis personally accepted the surrender of General Aglipay at Ilocos Norte in 1901, bringing relative peace to the north. He was then transferred back to Chicago to help the recruiting effort, returning to the Philippines with the 20th in 1904 for two more years of occupation duty during the Moro War. He served at headquarters as the Adjutant General of the 1st Brigade in Manila. In early 1906 the 20th Infantry was called home, to the Presidio in San Francisco, just in time to help cope with the impending disaster.

== The San Francisco earthquake ==
When the 1906 San Francisco earthquake struck, the city turned quickly to the Army for help. A few years earlier, while John J Pershing was in the Philippines, a fire consumed the General's residence at the Presidio, killing his wife and three of his young children. In an effort to avert such a tragedy in the future, the first dedicated fire department was created on station, and they would prove valuable in fighting the fire that swept the city after the earthquake. Captain Lewis was still serving with the 20th Infantry Regiment when they were stationed in at the Presidio in Monterey when an urgent call for aid was sent to the commanding officer, Colonel Marion P. Maus. When General Funston took command of the city, Military Districts were established to manage the crisis. The 20th Infantry was assigned to the Third Military District, establishing a command post at Portsmouth Square. They pitched their tents in front of the Hall of Justice, and played a key role in restoring order to daily life in the city. It was noted in the after action report "The most important duties were those devolving upon Colonel Maus, who guarded the business center in the burned district."

The following are excerpts from the report of Major General Adolpuhs Greely:

Several attempts had been made to get into telegraphic communication with the commanding officer of the Presidio of Monterey, in order to bring to the city a portion of the command of that post. Owing to the telegraph lines being down it was, however, impossible to communicate with any place south of San Francisco. On the 19th the Pacific Squadron had reached San Francisco Bay, and, at my request, Admiral C. F. Goodrich, commanding, sent a torpedo boat to the Presidio of Monterey, carrying the necessary message to the commanding officer of that post. These orders were delivered with great dispatch and with the result that on the 21st headquarters, 1st and 3d Battalions of the 20th Infantry, Col. Marion P. Maus, commanding, reached San Francisco and reported for duty, being followed the next day by field and staff and the 2d Squadron, 14th Cavalry.

The work of sanitation was exceptionally disagreeable. Many dead animals, human bodies and refuse, all in a decomposed condition, littered the area. Added to this the 20th Infantry was obliged to occupy points, where walls of building were tottering, where fires still raged, and in streets filled with debris. The troops subsisted for ten days on the rations carried on their persons from Monterey. They were courteous in deportment and considerate of the people, besides being faithful in their military duties. Verbal reports have been made of frequent cases in which enlisted men of the Regular Army, whose names are unknown, contributed greatly to giving some comfort to the homeless people, making personal sacrifices and furnishing supplies for persons to who they were unknown.

In 1908 he was detached again from his unit, to serve as a professor of military science and tactics at the University of California. In 1912 he was promoted to the rank of major, and was selected to attend the Field Officers Course at Fort Leavenworth, graduating March 19, 1913. This was a special class in tactics organized just for the attendees.

== Vera Cruz ==
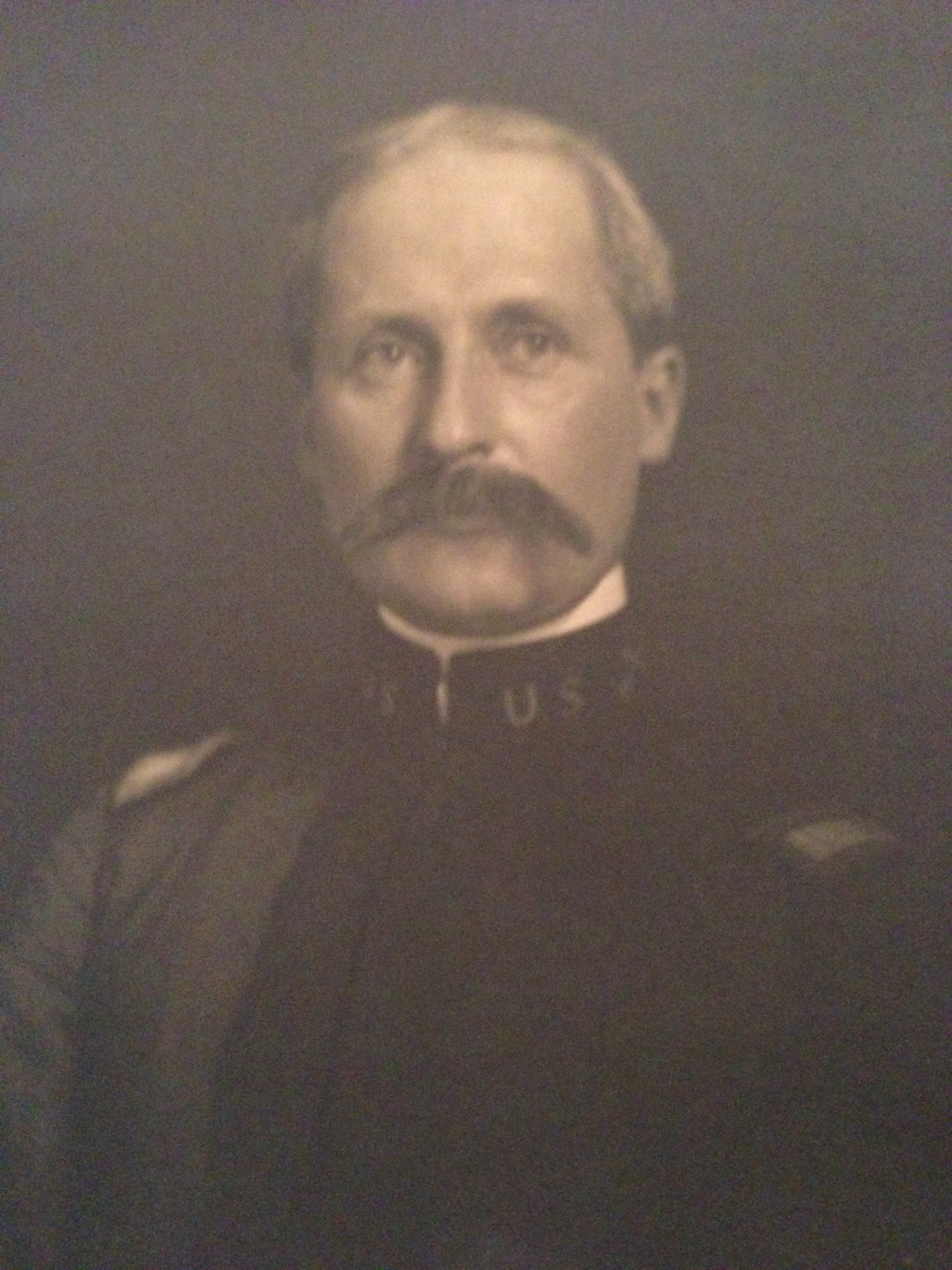
Image of Major Edward Mann Lewis

After graduation from the Field Officers Course, Lewis was assigned to Command the 19th Infantry at Fort Meade, South Dakota. During the Mexican Revolution, the 19th was moved to Galveston, Texas to take up border duty. The Tampico Affair began as a minor incident involving U.S. sailors and Mexican land forces loyal to General Victoriano Huerta during the guerra de las facciones phase of the Mexican Revolution. The misunderstanding occurred on April 9, 1914, but developed into a breakdown of diplomatic relations between the two countries. As a result, the United States invaded the port city of Veracruz, occupying it for more than six months. On April 30, the U.S. Army's 5th Reinforced Brigade under Brigadier General Frederick Funston arrived and took over the occupation of the city, with Lewis serving as the Treasurer of the Military Government during the United States occupation of Veracruz.

== Mobilization ==
In 1915, Lewis served as Inspector-Instructor of the Illinois National Guard in Springfield, and was the senior mustering officer for the state. The next year, he was promoted to brigadier-general to command a brigade of National Guard troops, and was deployed to Texas. Placed in Command of the Llano Grande District, his 13th Provisional Brigade was composed of guardsmen from Indiana, Minnesota, Iowa, Nebraska, North Dakota, Louisiana and Oklahoma. As they mustered out in preparation of the war, he also served as Officer in charge of Military Affairs at Headquarters, Northeastern Department.

== World War I ==
Early in the American intervention in the war, Lewis was promoted to brigadier-general in the regular Army, taking command of the 76th Infantry Brigade, and later the 38th Infantry Division at Camp Shelby, Mississippi. As they trained and prepared for departure for Europe, General Lewis was sent to France and placed in command of all US Forces in Paris. With many members of the AEF stationed in the city and many more passing through on the way to the front, General Pershing thought it necessary to have one command responsible. In November 1917 Paris was made a separate military district, and became a separate command under General Lewis. He was given jurisdiction over all the troops stationed in the city, and all casual visitors. He published orders in December that prescribed the rules of conduct for all American forces in or visiting the city, or those rotating to or from the front lines. These regulations remained in force under his successors, when Paris was full of men seeking recuperation and recreation, and for whose good behavior the district commander was responsible.

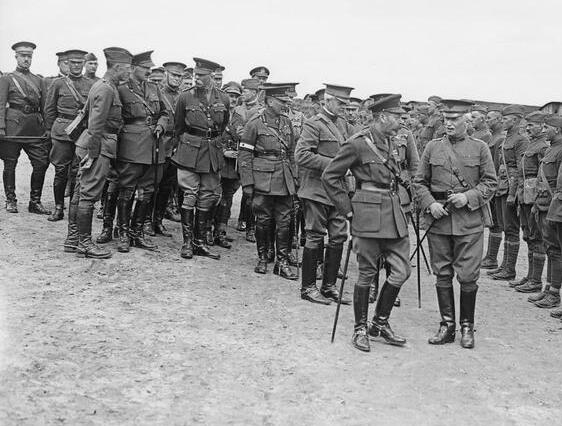
British King George V, along with Major General Edward M. Lewis, commanding the 30th Division, inspecting doughboys of Lewis's division in France, August 6, 1918. Stood behind the King is Brigadier General Samson L. Faison, commanding the 30th Division's 60th Brigade.

On May 5, 1918, he succeeded Brigadier General Peter Murray in command of the 3rd Infantry Brigade of Major General Omar Bundy's 2nd Division in Verdun, just before it moved south to blunt the German advance on Paris. With the Marines assigned to the division fighting in Belleau Wood, troops under Lewis dug in just south of the Paris to Metz road stopping the German advance just outside Chateau-Thierry. This Second Battle of the Marne would become part of the Hundred Days Offensive, turning the tide of the war to the Allies favor. In what Pershing called a "Brilliantly executed operation" Lewis led his brigade in capturing the important town of Vaux on July 1.

To celebrate the victories of the 2nd and 3rd Infantry Divisions, including the Marine Brigade serving under them in nearby Belleau Wood, a monument was raised just above the town of Chateau Thierry. The American Battlefield Commission Monument shines upon that hill today.

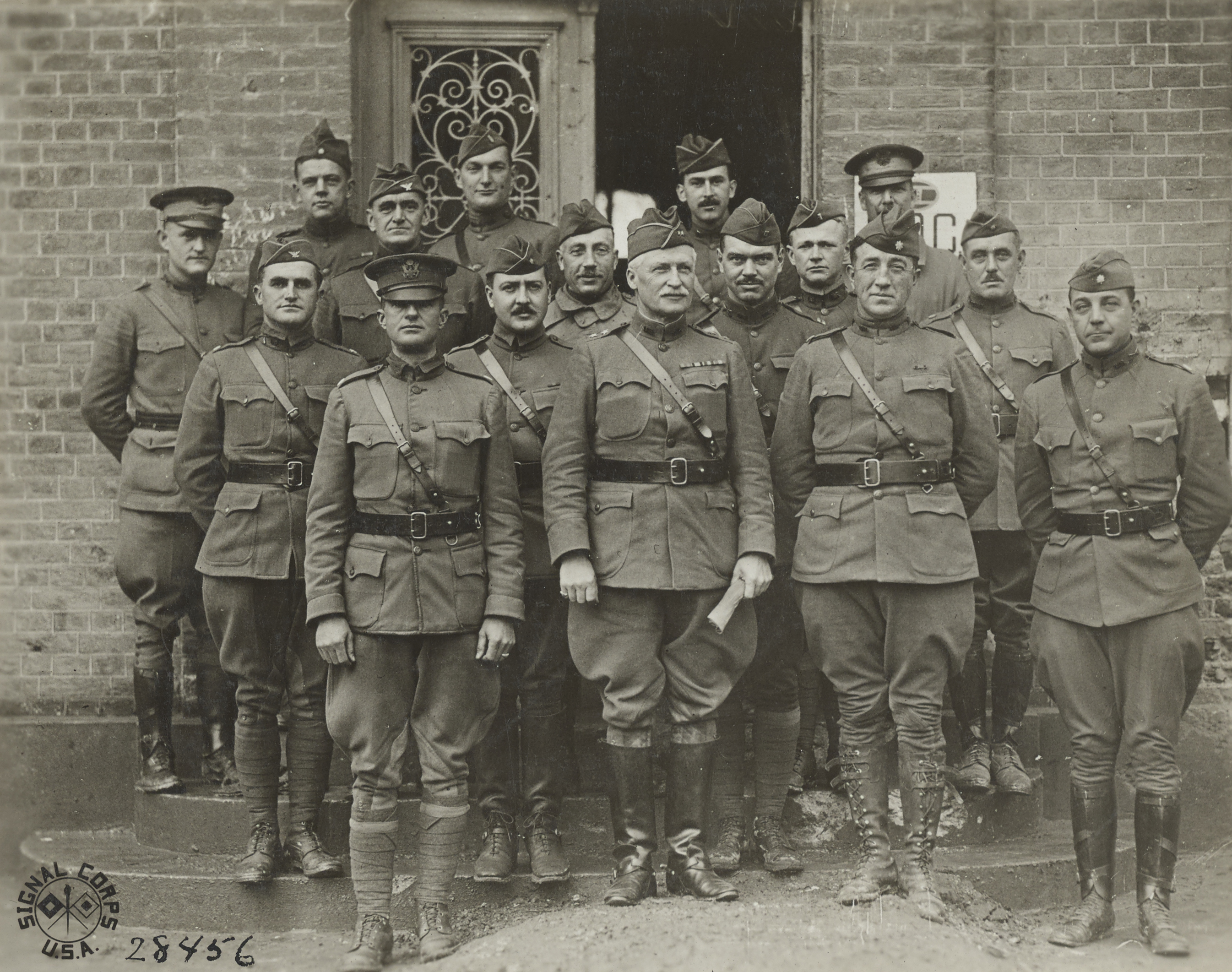
Major General Edward M. Lewis (center), commanding the 30th Division, pictured here together with members of his divisional staff in France, October 20, 1918. Stood to Lewis's right is the 30th's chief of staff, Colonel John K. Kerr.

In early July 1918 he was promoted to major general, and was assigned to command the 30th Division. The 30th and the 27th Division served under British Command as part of the bargain Pershing struck with General Haig and Marshall Foch, forming the II American Corps under General Read. "Old Hickory" fought with the First, Second, Third and Fourth British Armies, lastly serving under General Rawlinson. As part of the Fourth British Army, they broke through the Hindenburg Line on September 29, 1918, at Bellicourt in the Battle of St. Quentin Canal winning the praise of General Pershing "... the 30th Division did especially well. It broke through the Hindenburg Line on its entire front and took Bellicourt and part of Nauroy by noon of the 29th.". Still attached to the 4th, the 30th continued to attack while engaged in some of the most bitter fighting in the war. They pushed the Germans back seven miles to the Selle River by 11 October, then crossed it and captured Molain and St.-Martin-Riviere on the 17th. He was awarded the Army Distinguished Service Medal for his performance during this period. The medal's citation reads:

The President of the United States of America, authorized by Act of Congress, July 9, 1918, takes pleasure in presenting the Army Distinguished Service Medal to Major General Edward Mann Lewis, United States Army, for exceptionally meritorious and distinguished services to the Government of the United States, in a duty of great responsibility during World War I. General Lewis Commanded with distinction the 30th American Division during its successful operations in Belgium with the 2d British Army, and later, with the 4th British Army in the offensive which resulted in the breaking of the enemy's Hindenburg line. During all these operations he exhibited great ability, determined energy, and marked devotion to duty.

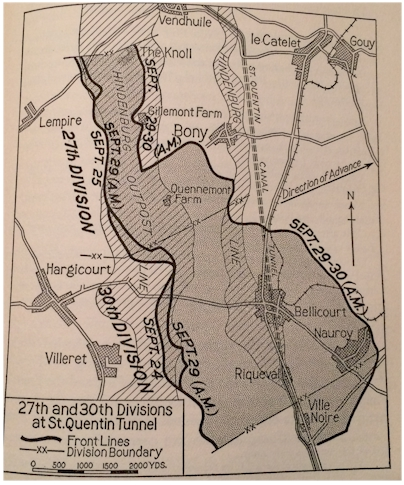
U.S. II Corps serving under British Fourth Army September 1918

Field Marshal Sir Douglas Haig, Commander of the British Expeditionary Force, sent this letter to General Read, Commanding the II American Corps:

"I wish to express to you personally and to all the officers and men serving under you my warm appreciation of the very valuable and gallant services rendered by you throughout the recent operations with the Fourth British Army. Called upon to attack positions of great strength, held by a determined enemy, all ranks of the 27th and 30th American Divisions under your command displayed an energy, courage, and determination in attack which proved irresistible. It does not need me to tell you that in the heavy fighting of the past three weeks you have earned the lasting esteem and admiration of your British Comrades-in-Arms, whose success you so nobly shared"

General Pershing visited the 30th Infantry Division on 21 January 1919 for an inspection, and sent the following letter to General Lewis:

AMERICAN EXPEDITIONARY FORCES OFFICE OF THE COMMANDER-IN-CHIEF, FRANCE, February 19, 1919 MAJOR GENERAL EDWARD M. LEWIS, Commanding 30th Division, A. E. F.

MY DEAR GENERAL LEWIS:

It gives me much pleasure to extend to you and the officers and men of the 30th Division my sincere compliments upon their appearance at the review and inspection on the 21st of January, southwest of Teille, which was excellent, and is just what would be expected in a command with such a splendid fighting record.

After its preliminary training the Division entered the line on July 16, where it remained almost continuously until the end of October. In that time it was in the actual battle from 30 August, and took part in the Ypres-Lys and Somme offensives. On September 29, the Division broke through both the Hindenburg and the Le Catlet-Nauroy lines, capturing Bellicourt and Nauroy, an operation on which all subsequent action of the 4th British Army depended. From October 7 to October 20, the Division advanced 23 kilometers in a continued series of attacks, capturing 2,352 of the enemy. Brancourt, Premont, Busigny, St. Benin, St. Couplet and Escaufort, La Haie Mineresse, and Vaux Andigny are names which will live in the memories of those who fought in the 30th Division. But its especial glory will always be the honor you won by breaking the Hindenburg Line on September 29. Such a record is one of which we are all proud.

It is gratifying to see your troops in such good physical shape, but still more so to know that this almost ideal condition will continue to the end of their service and beyond, as an exemplification of their high character and soldierly qualities.

I inspected the artillery brigade of the Division later, and found the same high standard of personnel that marks the rest of the Division.

Very Sincerely Yours, JOHN J. PERSHING

Lewis would lead the 30th Division until its return to the United States in 1919, with him staying behind in France to lead the Infantry Board (informally called "The Lewis Board"), to study and learn the lessons of the war.

== Post-war years ==
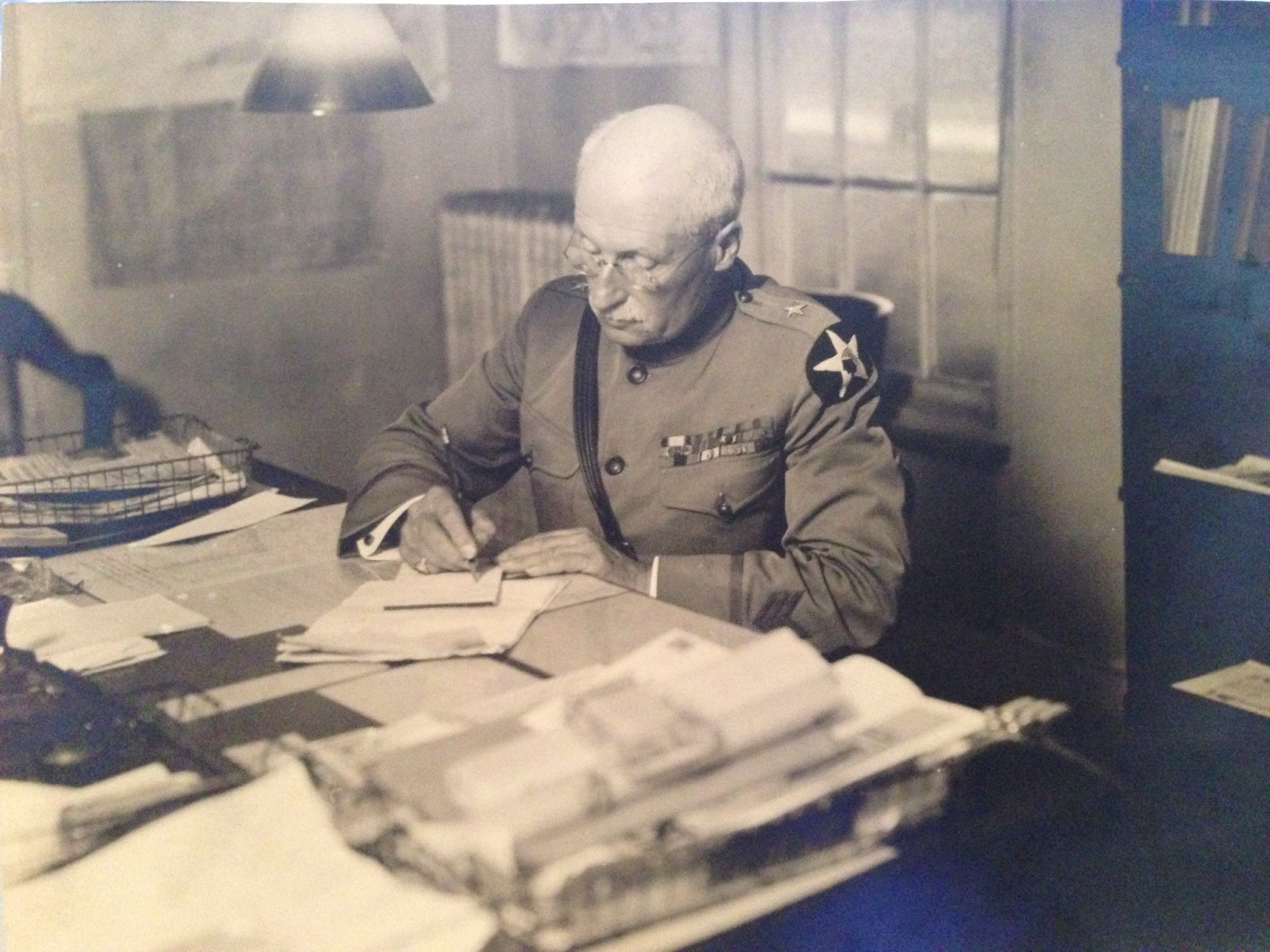
Major General Edward Mann Lewis at his desk

In July 1919, General Lewis commanded the 5th Division at Camp Gordon in Georgia, then was put in Command of the Douglas Arizona District. He then led the 3rd Division (now famously called "The Rock of the Marne") at Camp Pike in Arkansas. Later he was placed in command of his much loved "Indianhead" 2nd Infantry Division at Camp Travis in Texas, and helped give birth to Army Aviation there.

In December 1922, he was promoted to command the 8th Corps, the largest Army in the United States at that time. As commander, his assigned quarters were the now famous Pershing House at Fort Sam Houston. His son Major Henry Balding Lewis was able to join him out west, with his new bride. At this time the Army started retiring the horse from Cavalry service, and mechanized.

== The Hawaiian Department ==
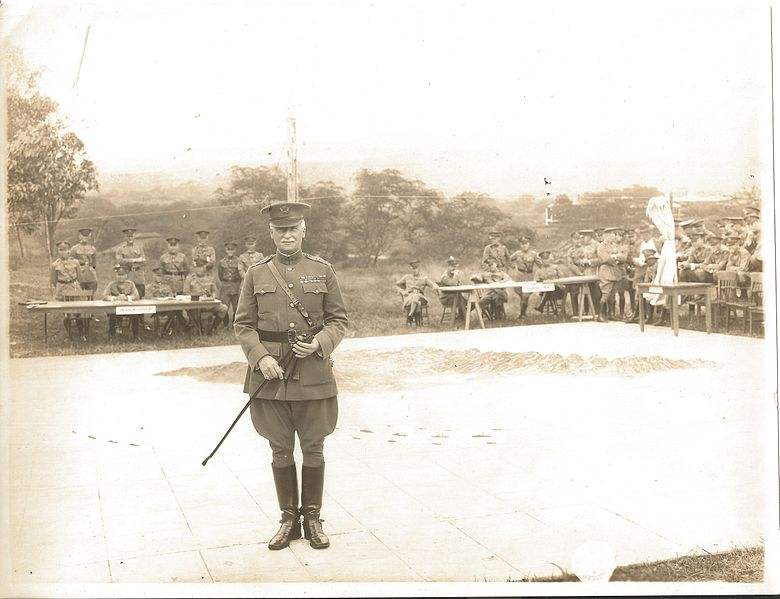
Maj. Gen. Edward Mann Lewis During Exercises in Hawaii 1924

In 1924 General Lewis was selected to command the Hawaiian Division until January 1925, when he was placed in charge of the Hawaiian Department. While in Hawaii, General Lewis presided over the largest military exercises in US history to date, with the Army defending the islands from a Naval invasion. He also toured China in 1927, visiting both the Marines and the Army's 15th Infantry Regiment in Tianjin (formerly Tientsin). While there, he was able to see his son Henry Balding Lewis, the Adjutant General of US Forces in China, along with Henry's wife Sarah (Lallie) and their daughter, Frances Harriet Lewis, only 8 years old at the time. Frances and her husband, Colonel Frank Henry Stone are buried next to her father and mother, at Arlington National Cemetery.

He ran the Hawaiian Department until his retirement in December 1927 culminating 46 years of distinguished service to his nation.

After travelling the world to visit his wartime friends, Major General Edward Mann Lewis and his wife settled in Berkeley, California close to his friends and the university where he once taught. Late in life he spent much time in the hospital, but kept his upbeat disposition and encouraged those around him. He died and was laid to rest in the ellipse of the San Francisco National Cemetery at the Presidio on July 29, 1949.

== Decorations ==
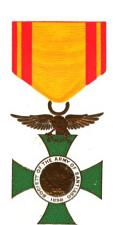
Army Distinguished Service Medal
Spanish Campaign Medal
Mexican Service Medal
Army of Cuban Occupation Medal
Philippine Campaign Medal
World War I Victory Medal with 5 Battle Clasps
Knight Commander, Order of the Bath (England)
Knight Commander, Order of St Michael and St George (England)
Commander, Legion of Honor (France)
Order of Leopold (Belgium)
Order of Leopold II (Belgium)
Knight Commander, Order of Prince Danilo I (Montenegro)
Croix de Guerre with 2 Palms (France)
Croix de Guerre with Palm (Belgium)
Society of the Army of Santiago de Cuba

== Gallery ==
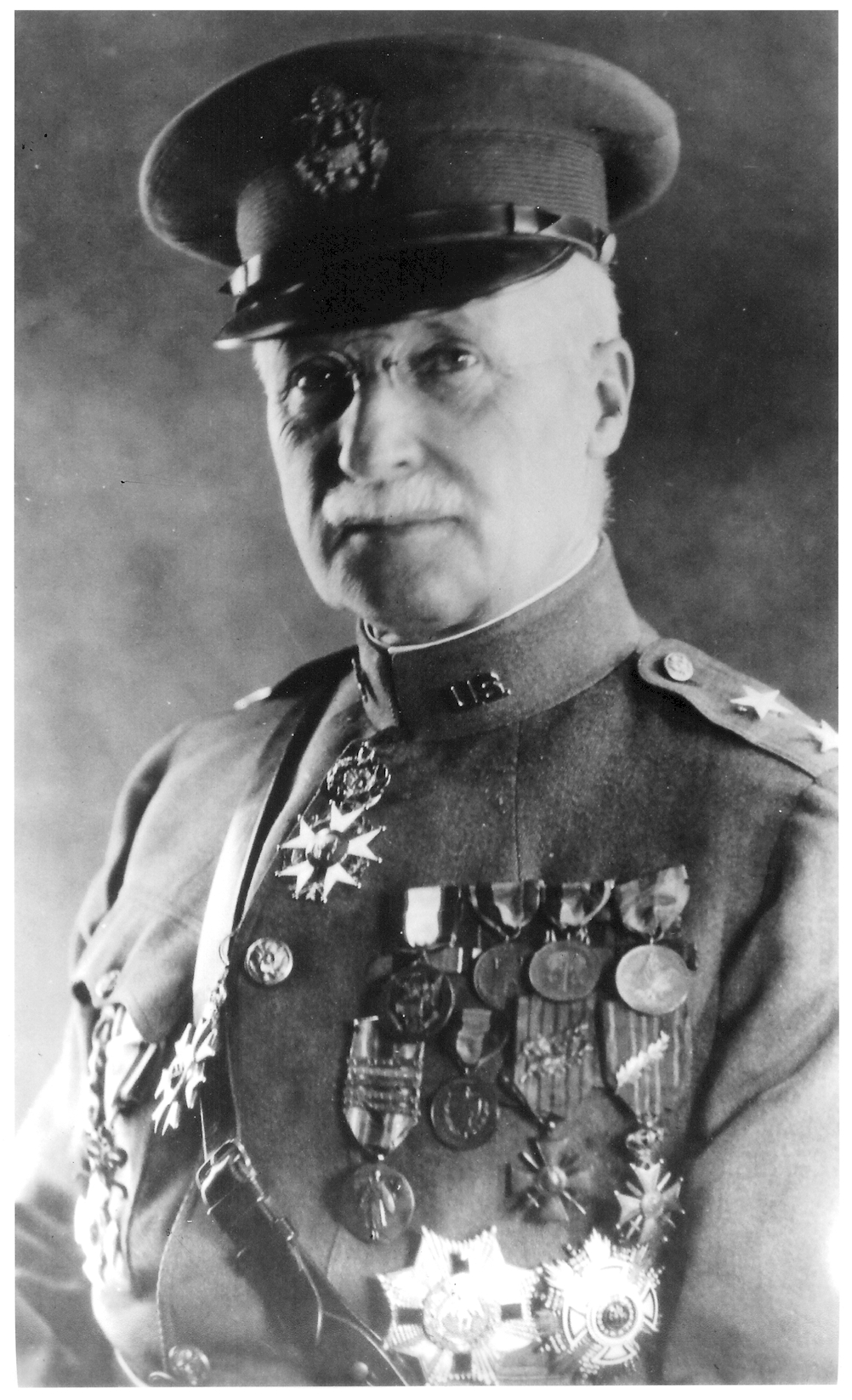
Major General Edward Mann Lewis 1924

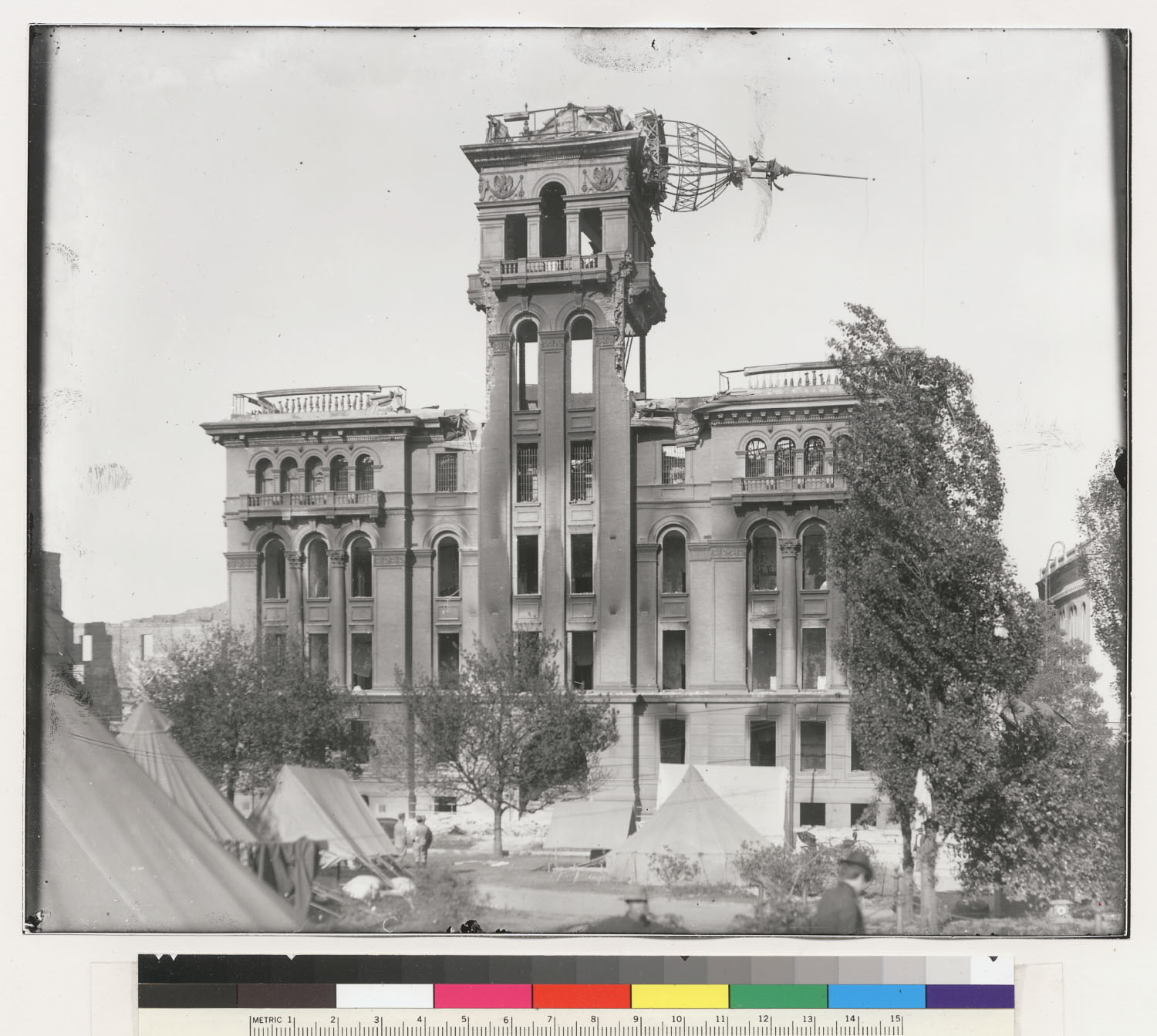
Portsmouth Square, Hall of Justice 3rd Military District HQ SF Earthquake 1906

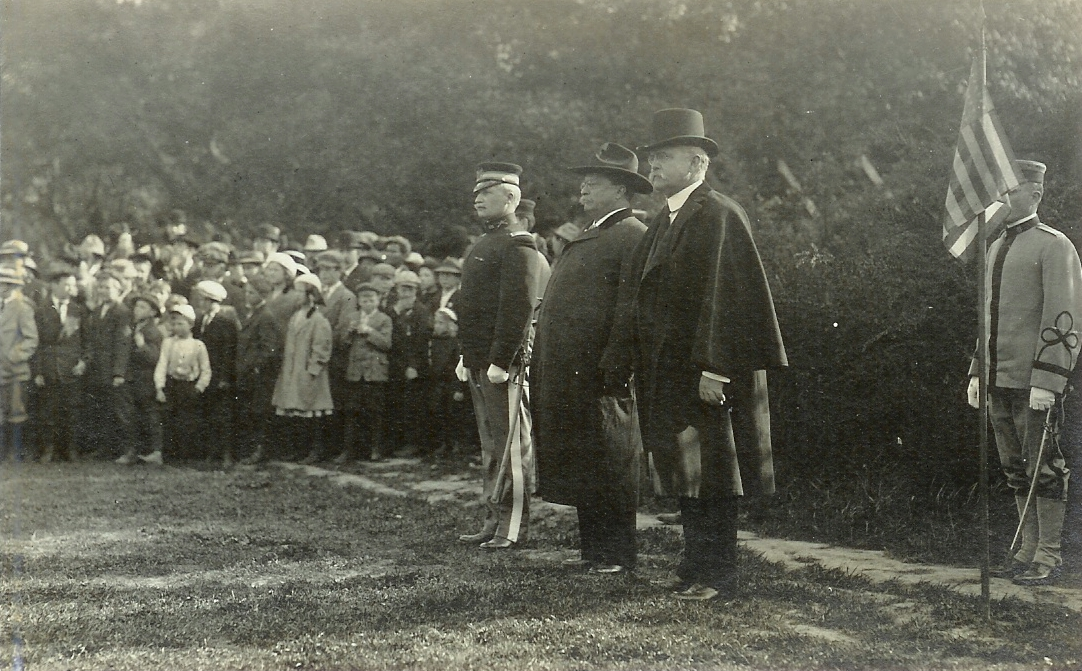
Brigadier General Lewis and Teddy Roosevelt

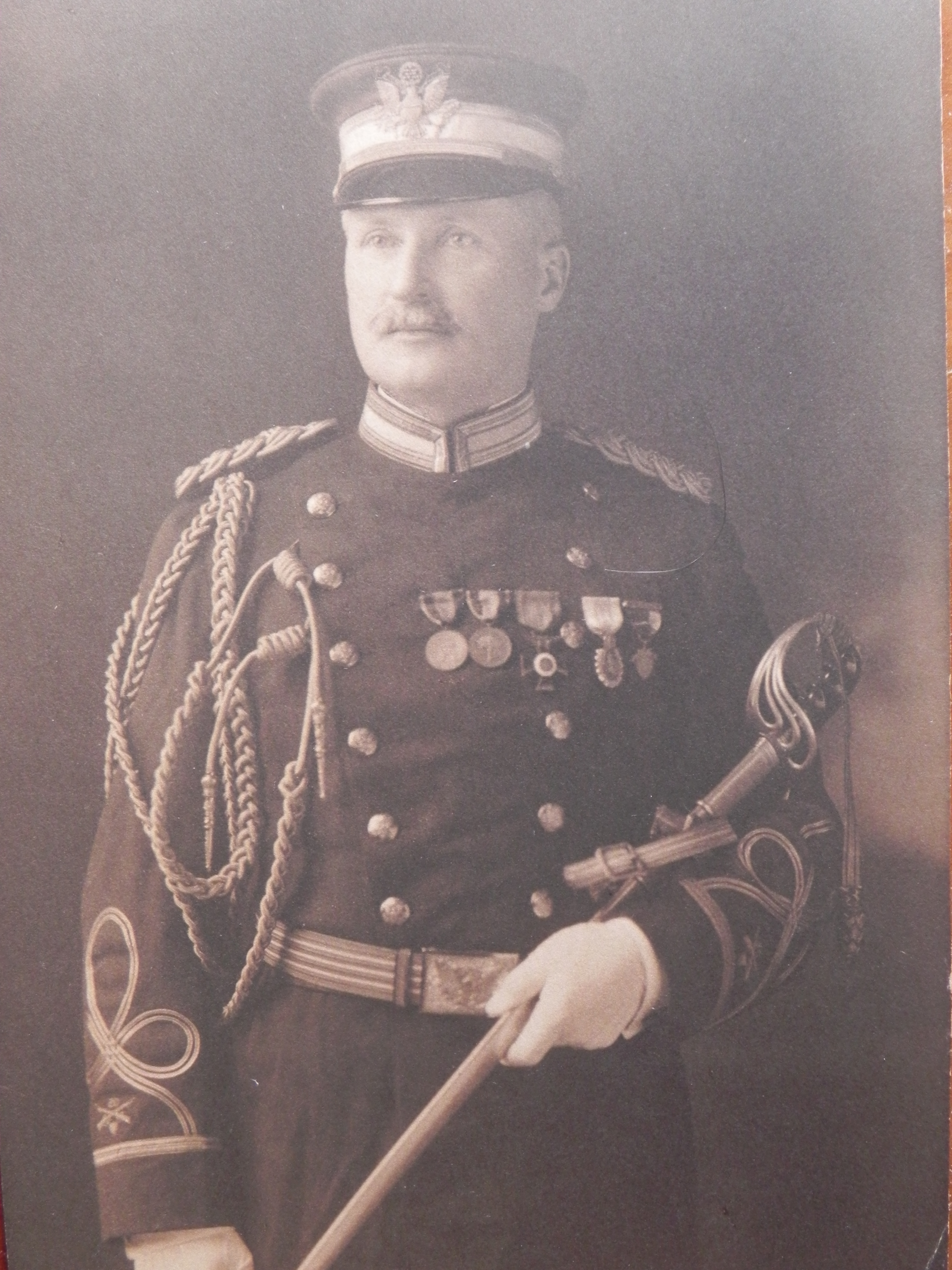
Brigadier General Edward Mann Lewis

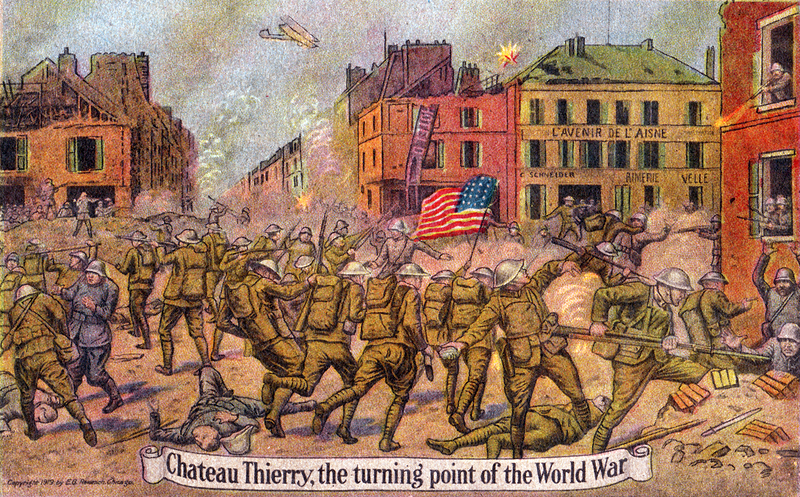
Chateau-Thierry Turning Point in World War I

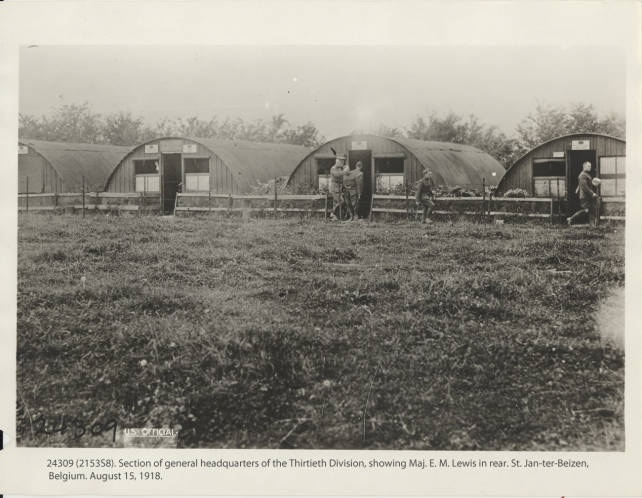
General Lewis outside the 30th Infantry Division HQ in WWI

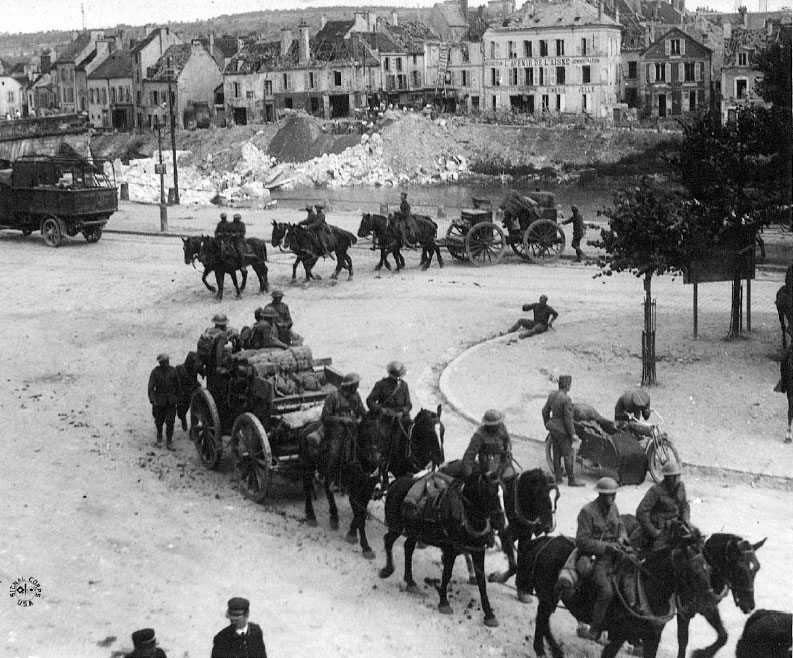
30th Infantry Division in Bellicourt, France

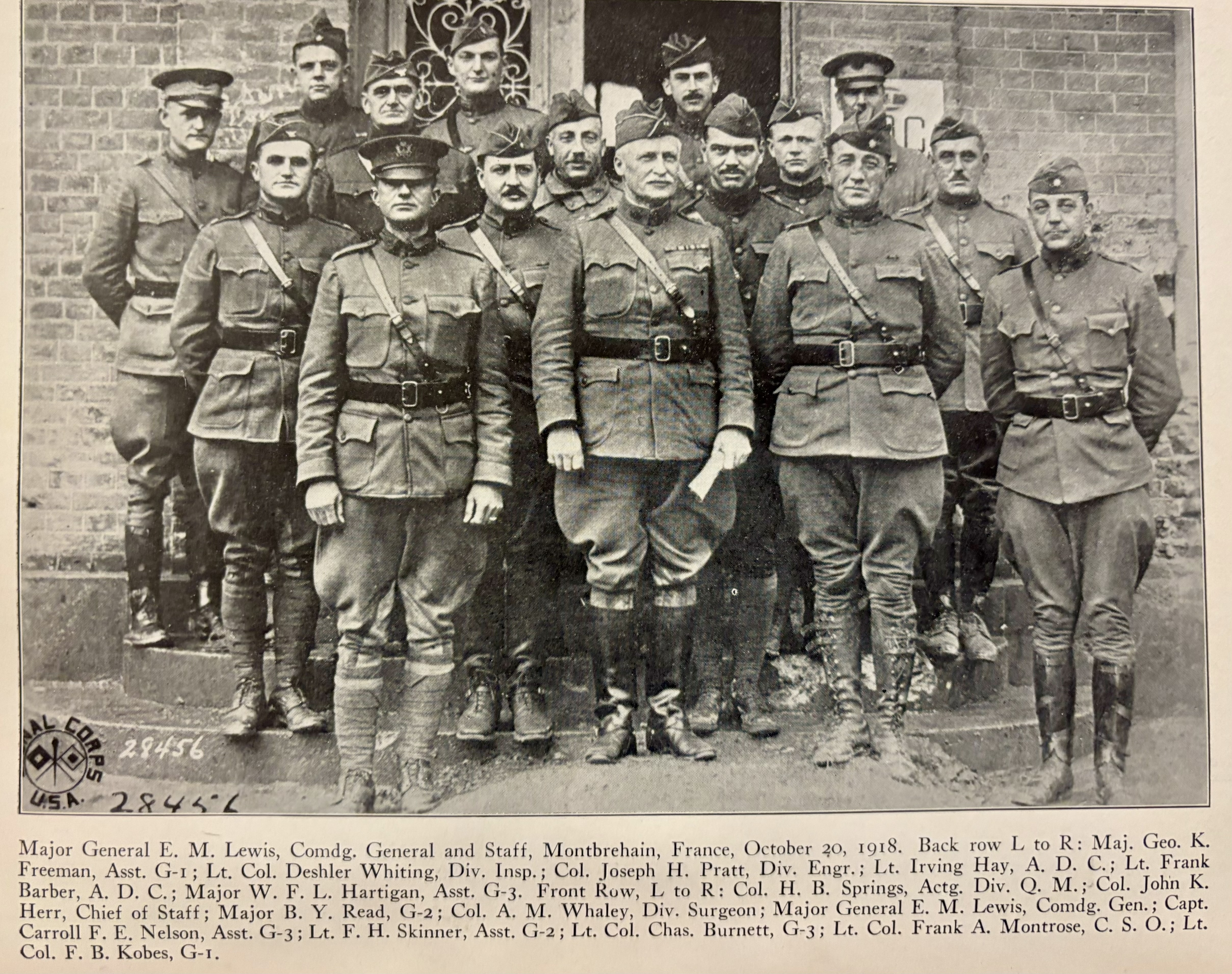
30th Infantry Division Commanding General E. M. Lewis and Staff Montbrehain, France 20 October 1918

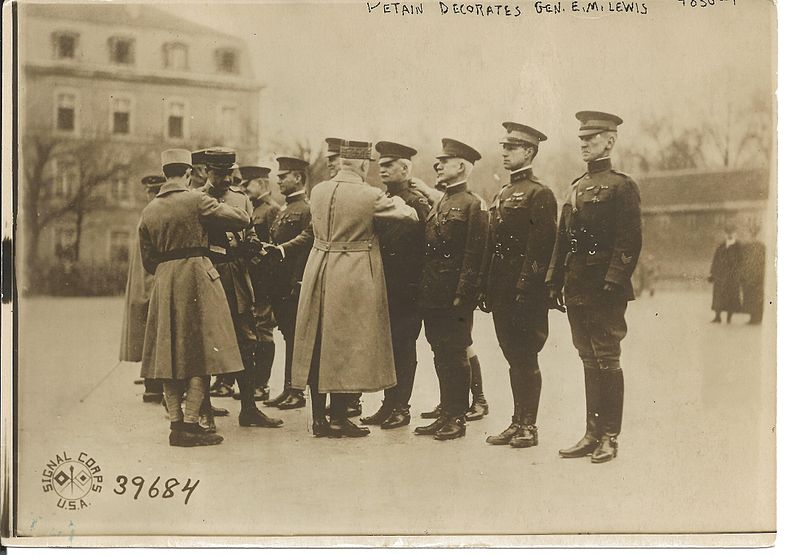
Marshall Petain awards Gen. Lewis Commander, Legion of Honor

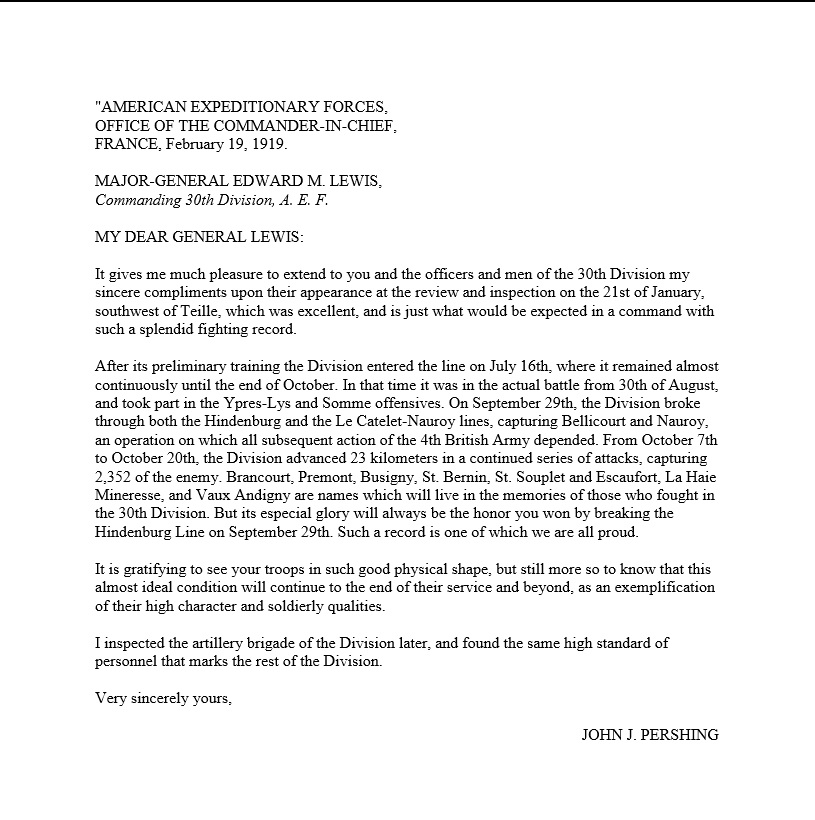
Letter to Major General Lewis Praising the 30th Infantry Division for Actions in WWI

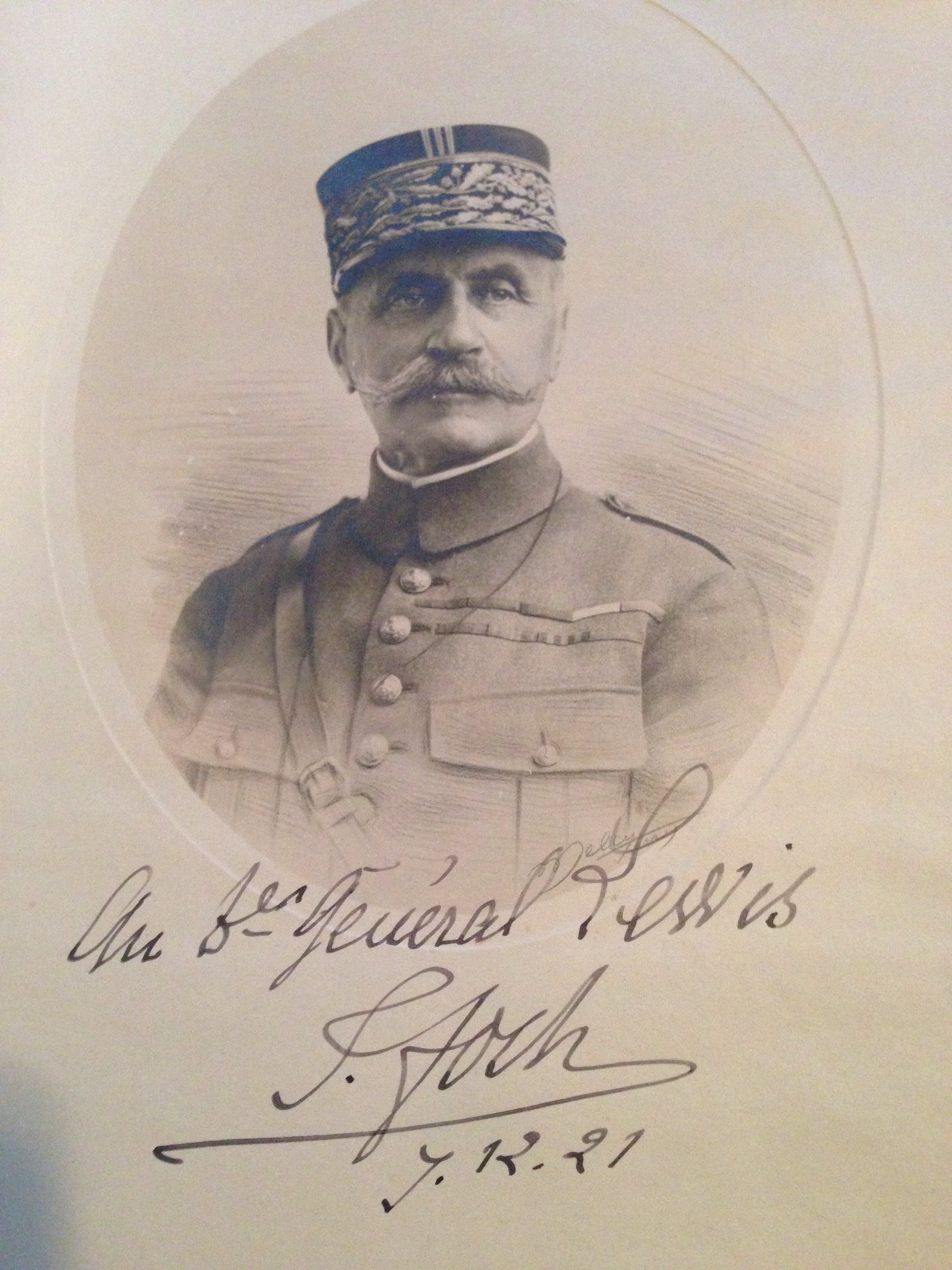
Signed photograph of Grand Marshal Foch of France to General Lewis

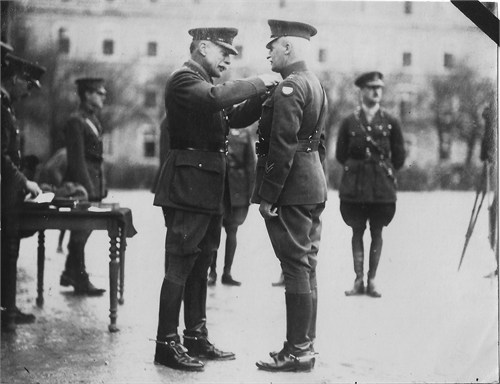
Field Marshal Haig awards Lewis Knight Commander Order of St. Michael and St. George

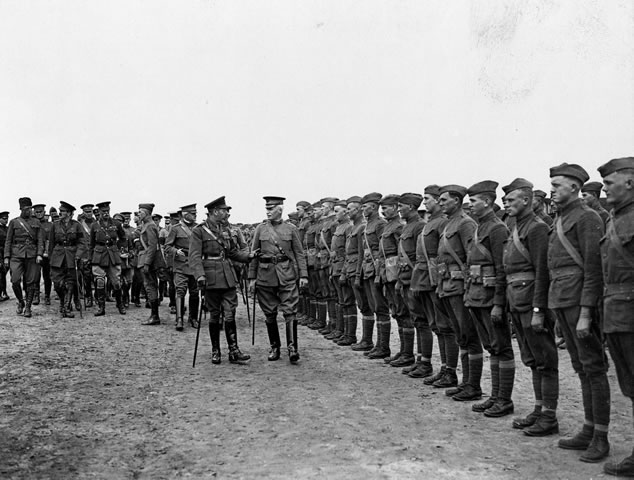
King George V and Major General Edward Mann Lewis Inspect the 30th Infantry Division

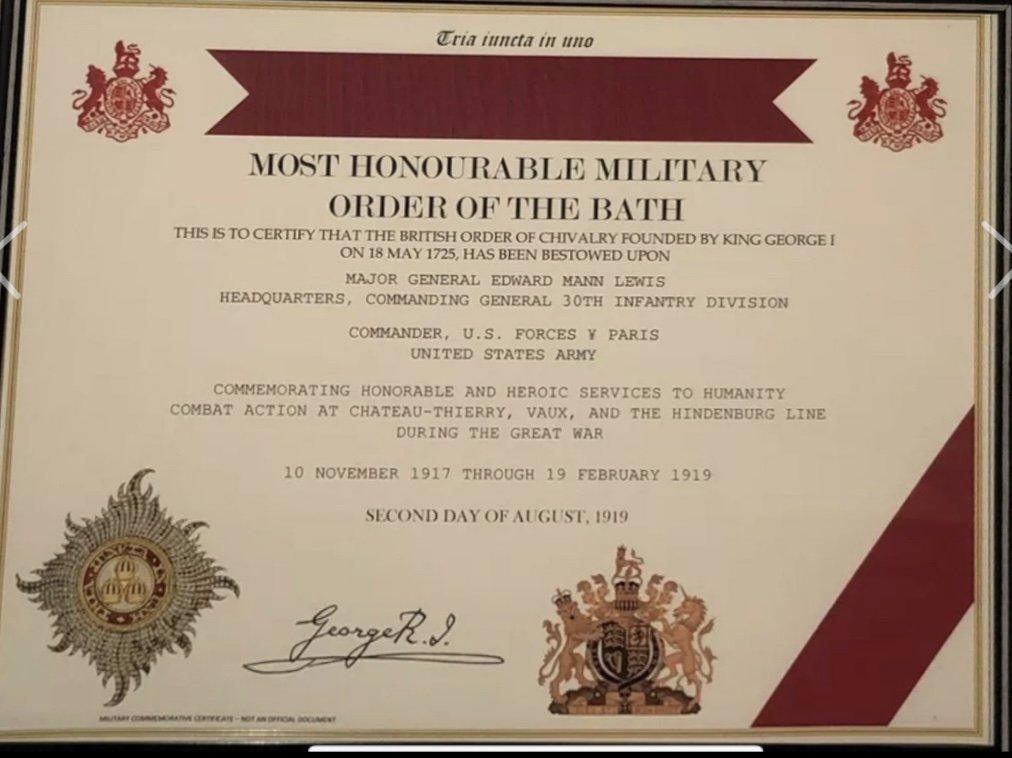
Military Order of the Bath Awarded to Major General Edward Mann Lewis for Heroic Services to Humanity During The Great War

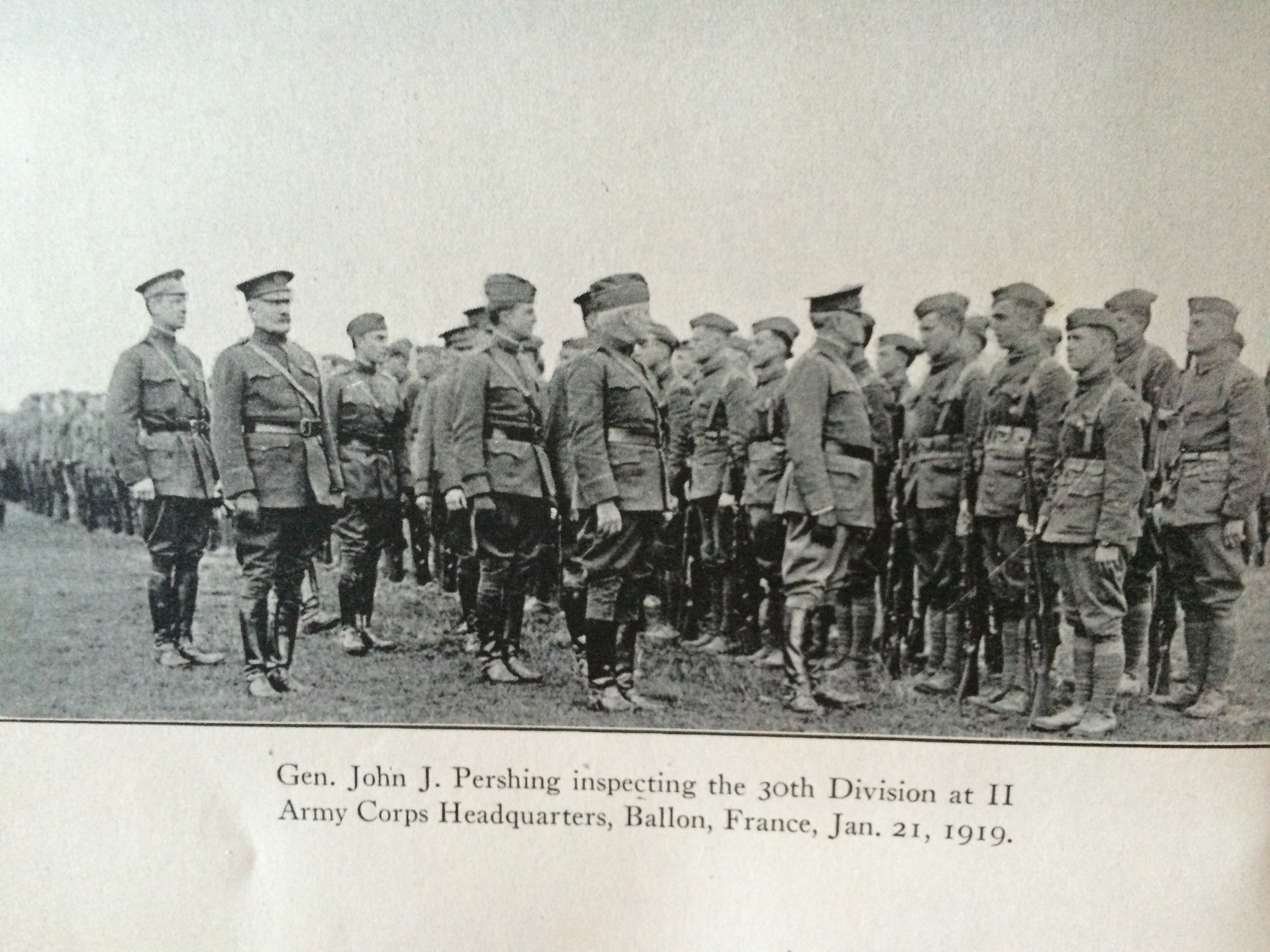
General Pershing inspects the 30th Division at II Army Corps HQ at Ballon, France January 21, 1919

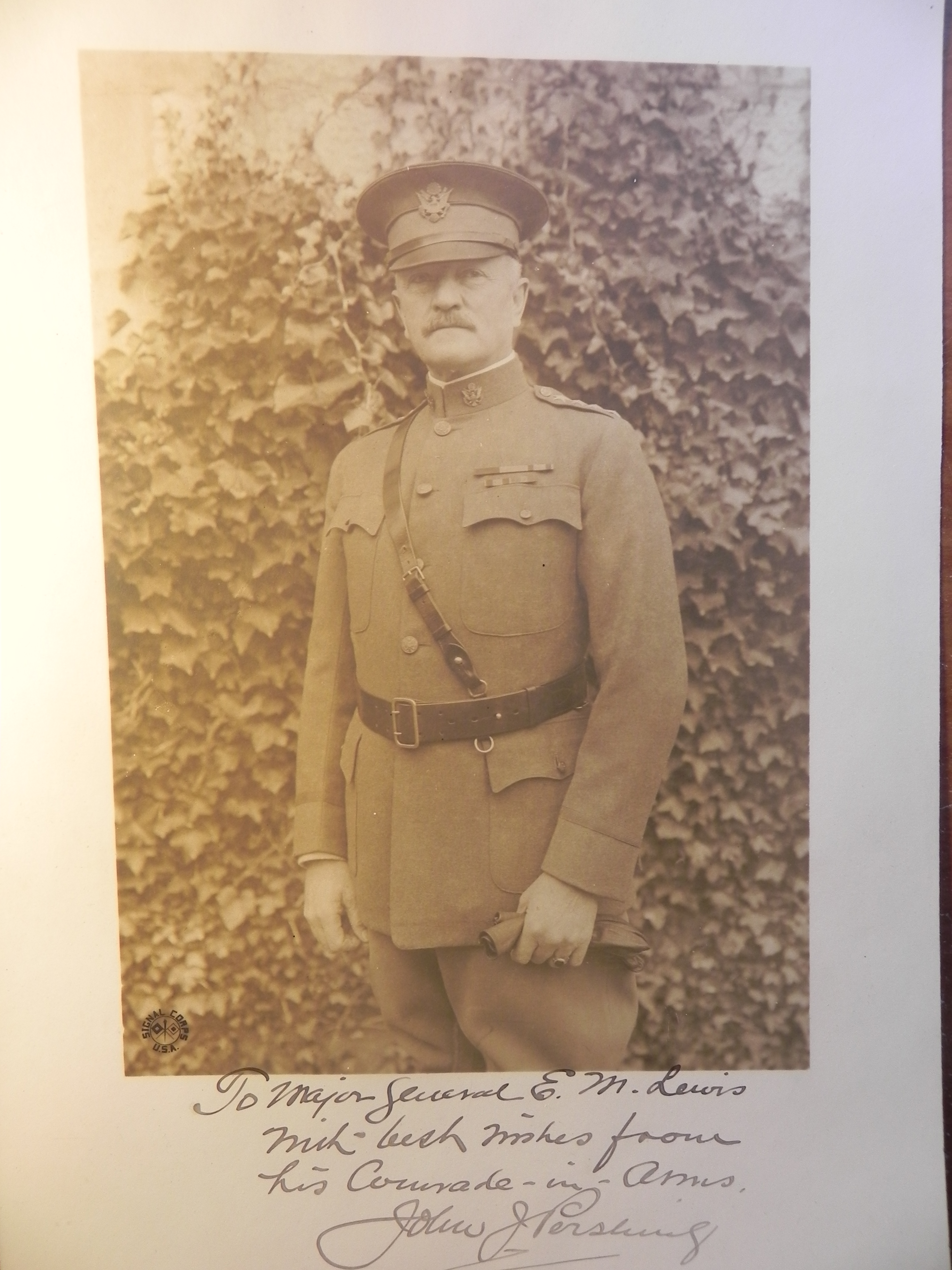
Signed Pershing Picture to his Comrade in Arms, Major General E M Lewis

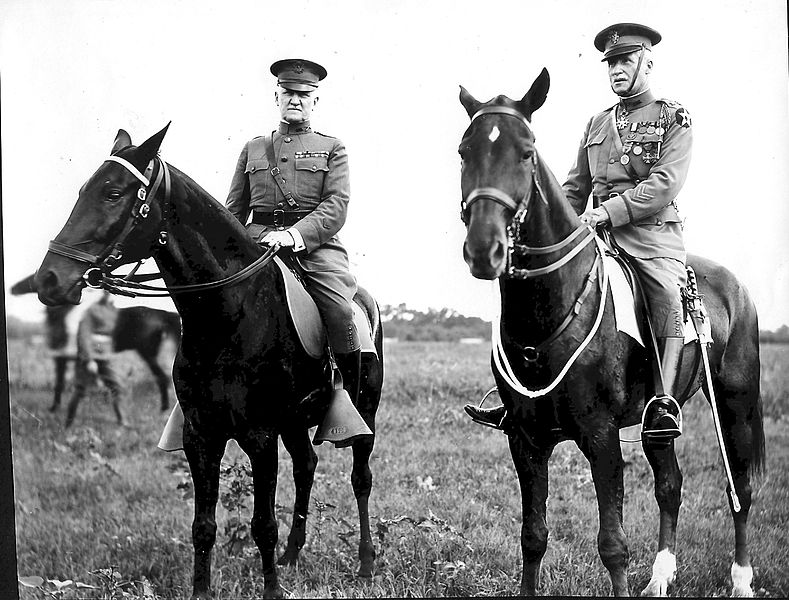
General Lewis and General Pershing on horseback in Texas 1924

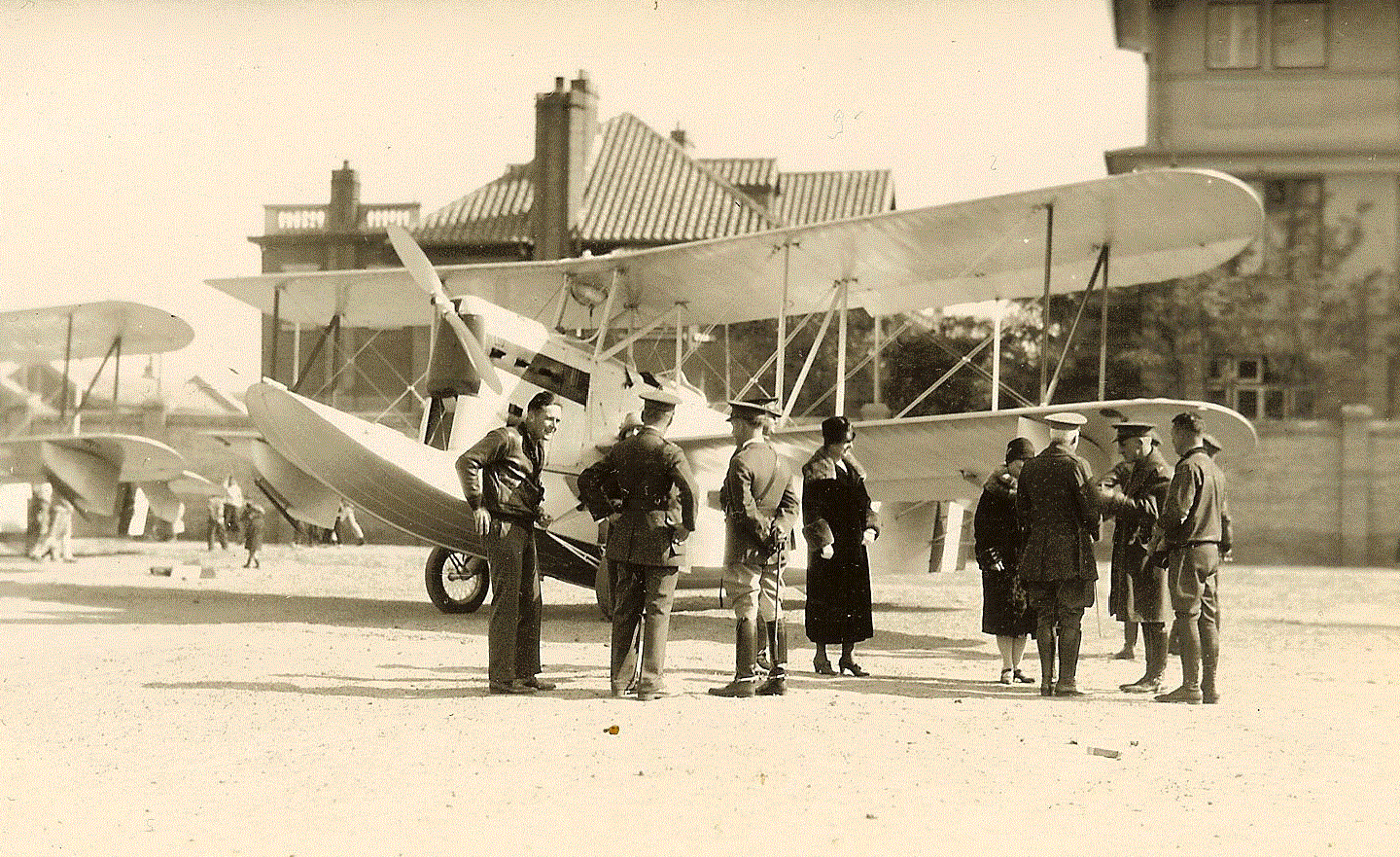
Major General Lewis inspects aircraft at Hsin Ho Airfield during Tianjin inspection in 1927 - Image courtesy of chinamarine.org

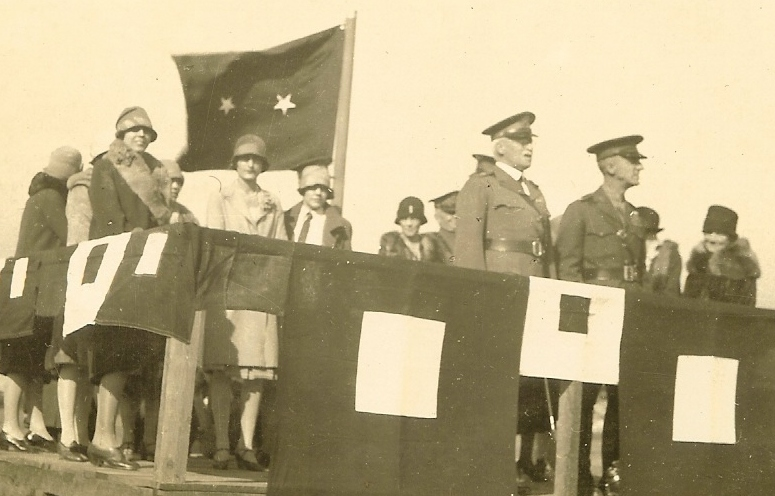
Major General Lewis reviews troops during Tianjin inspection in 1927 - Image courtesy of chinamarine.org

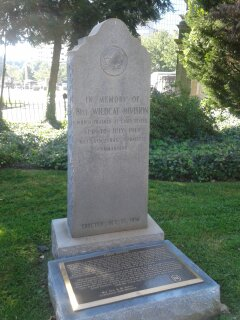
30th Division World War I Monument located just outside Springwood Cemetery, Greenville, SC

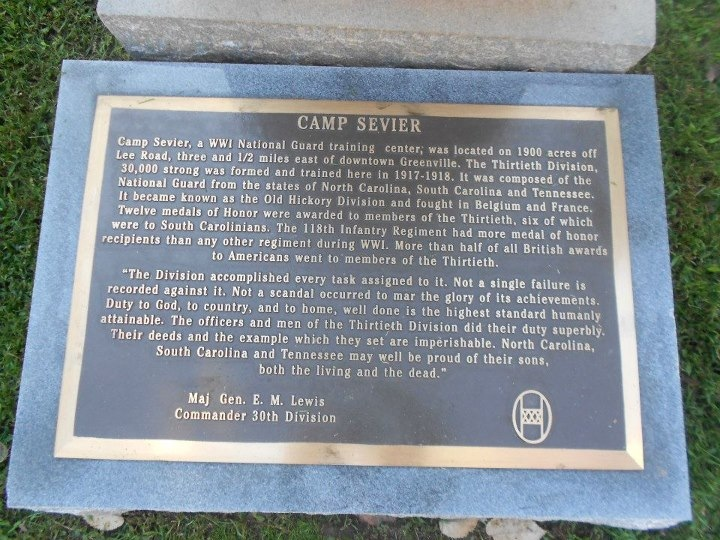
Close Up of marker signed by General Lewis located just outside Springwood Cemetery, Greenville, SC

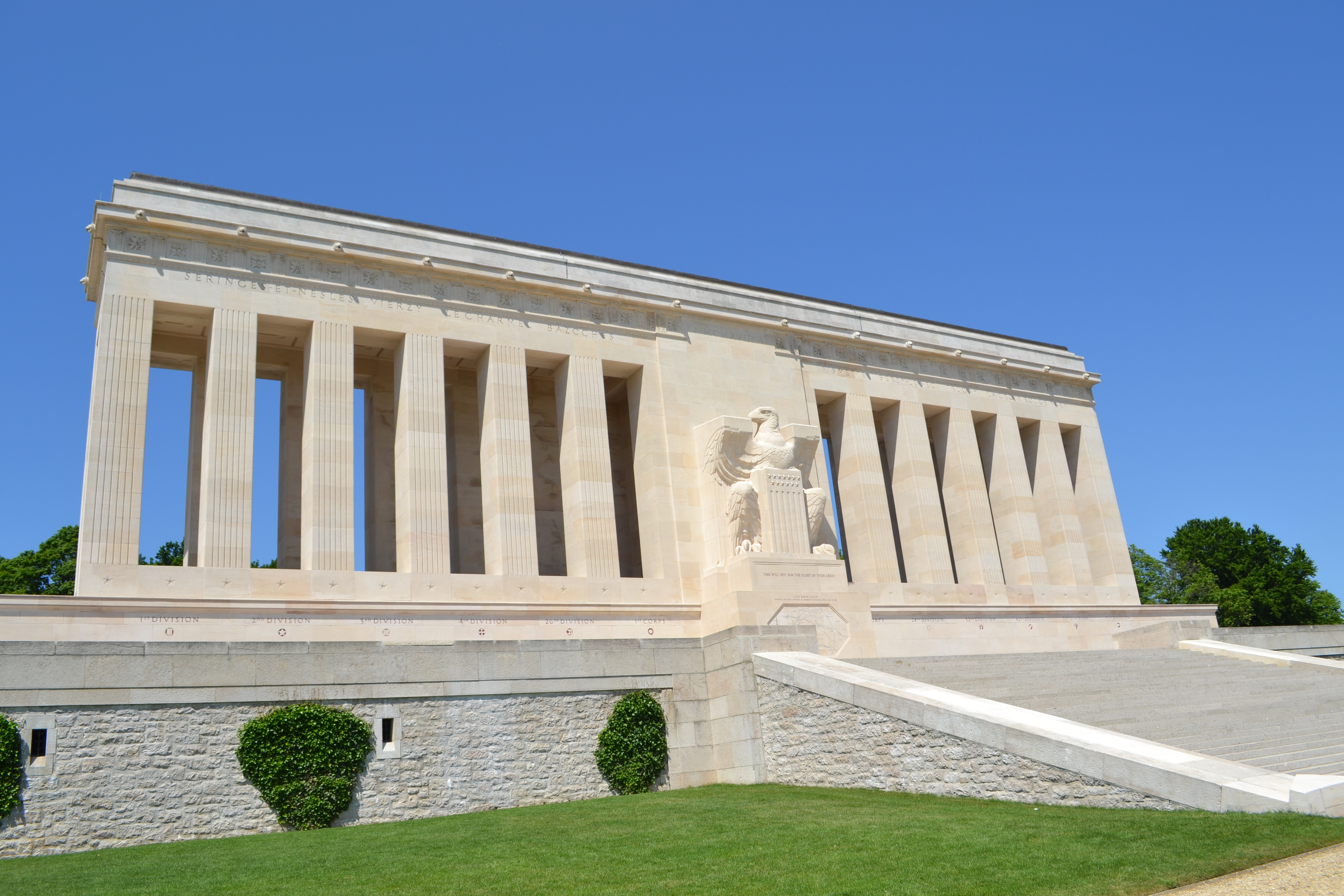
Chateau Thierry American Monument Front

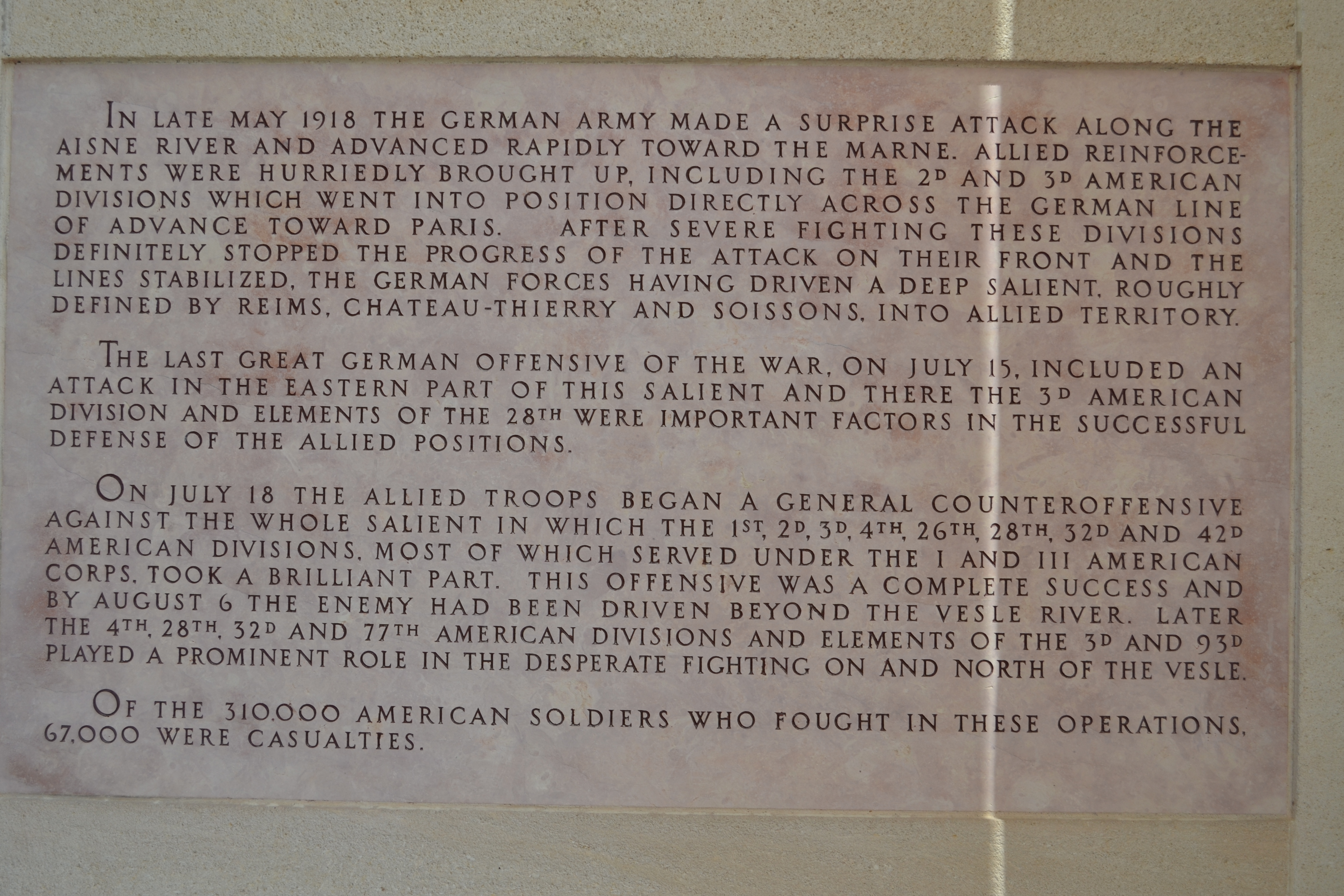
Chateau Thierry American Monument Side

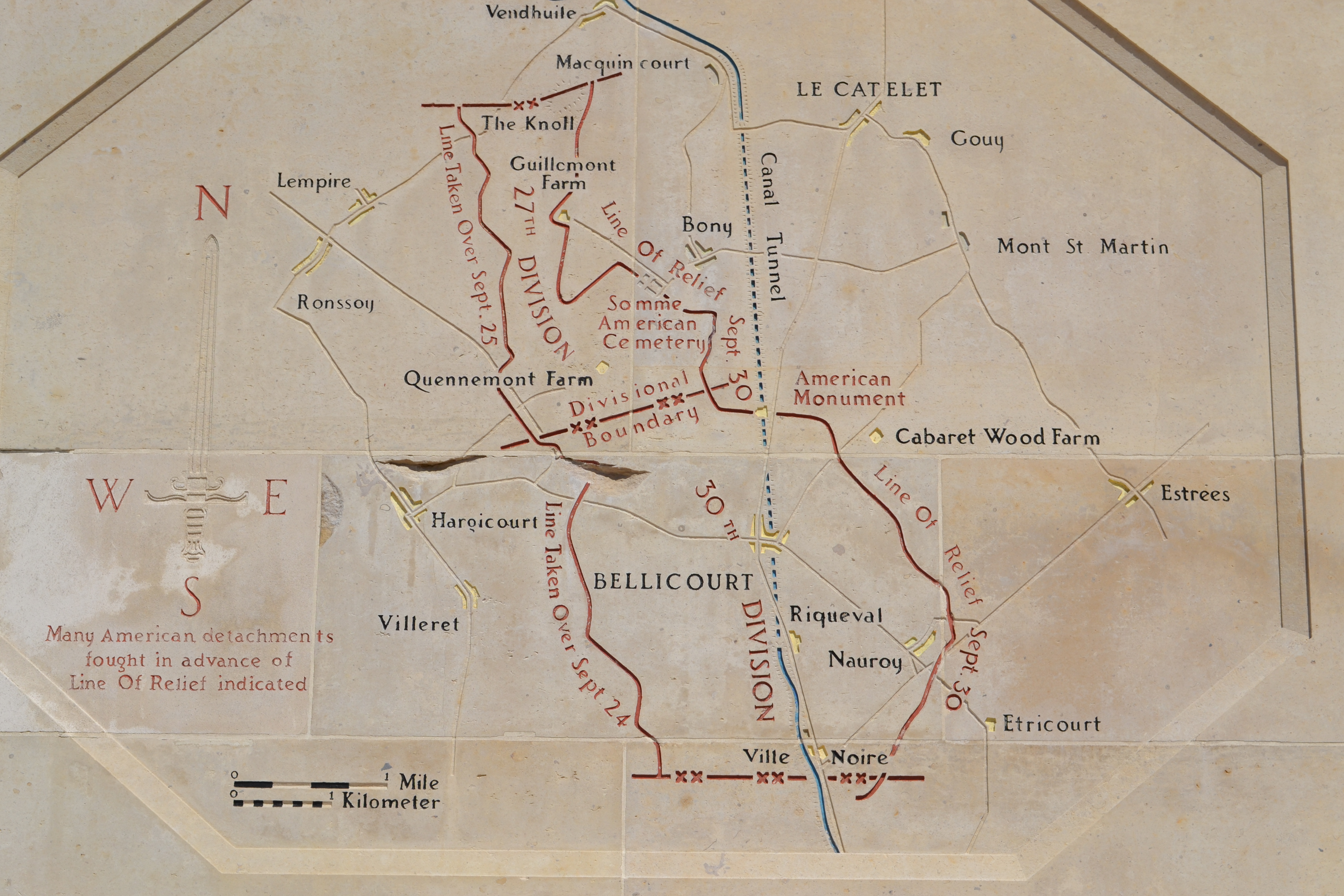
Chateau Thierry American Monument

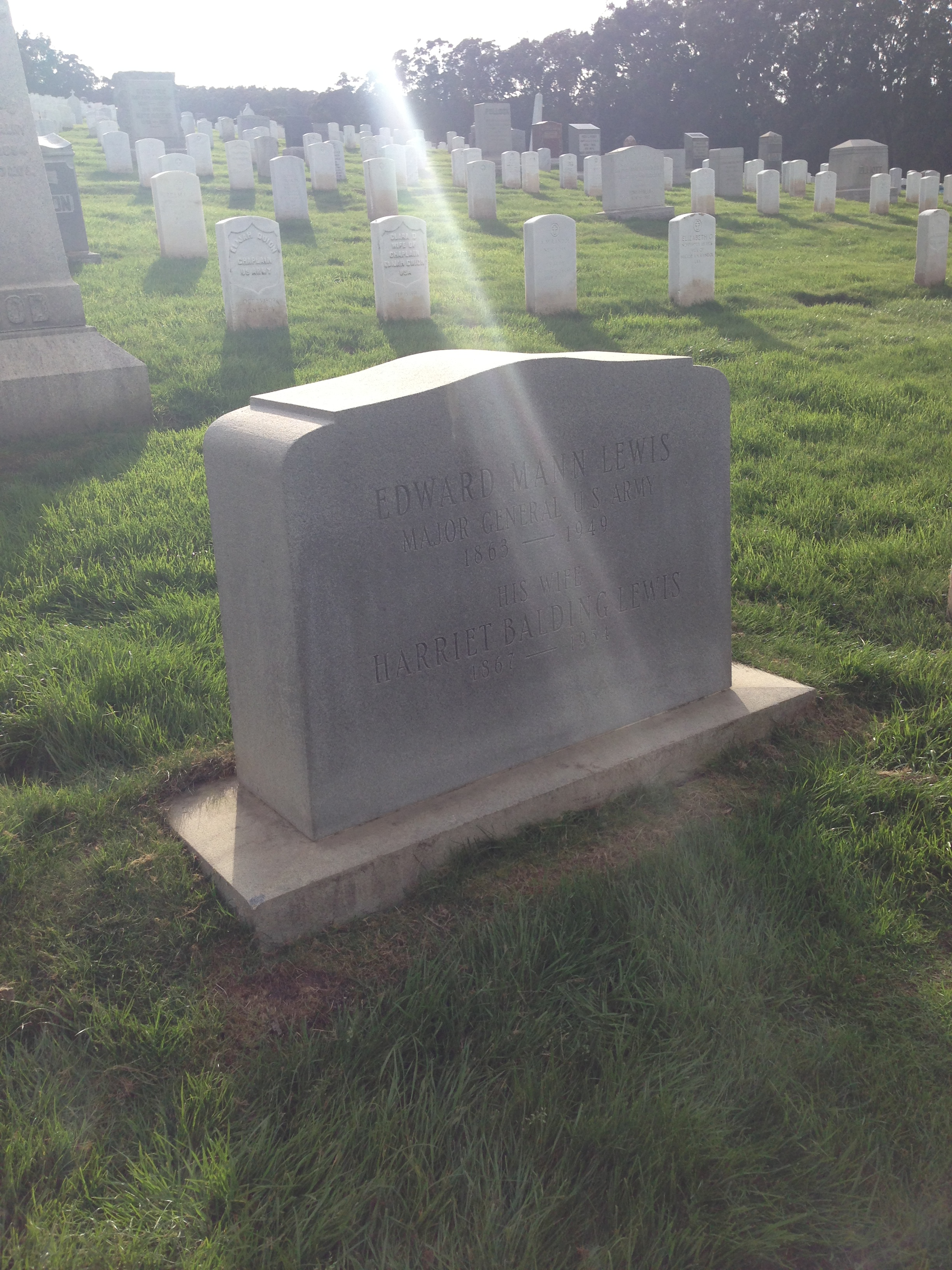
Gravesite of Major General Edward Mann Lewis at the San Francisco National Cemetery

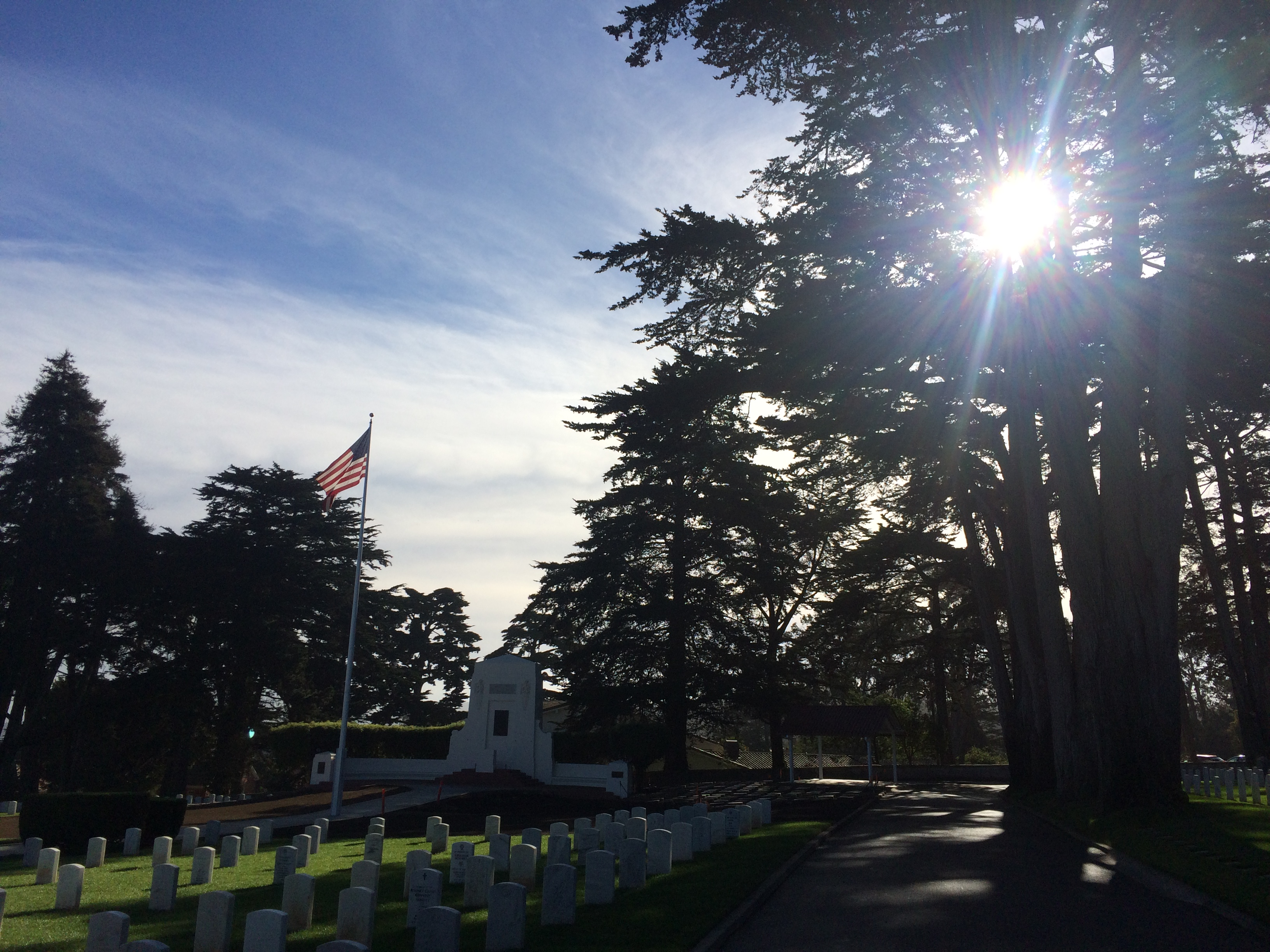
Sf National Cemetery

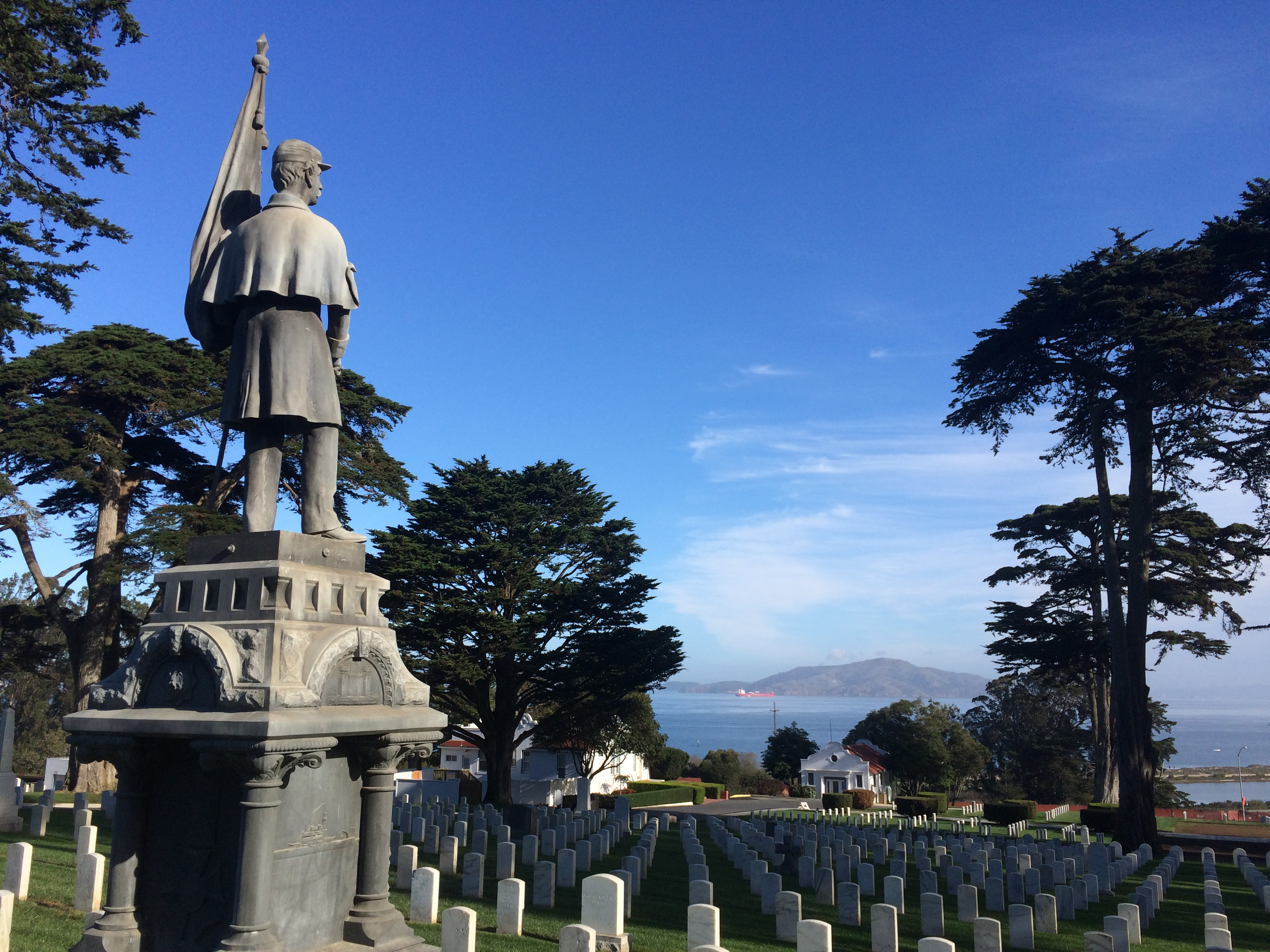
Standing guard at the San Francisco National Cemetery

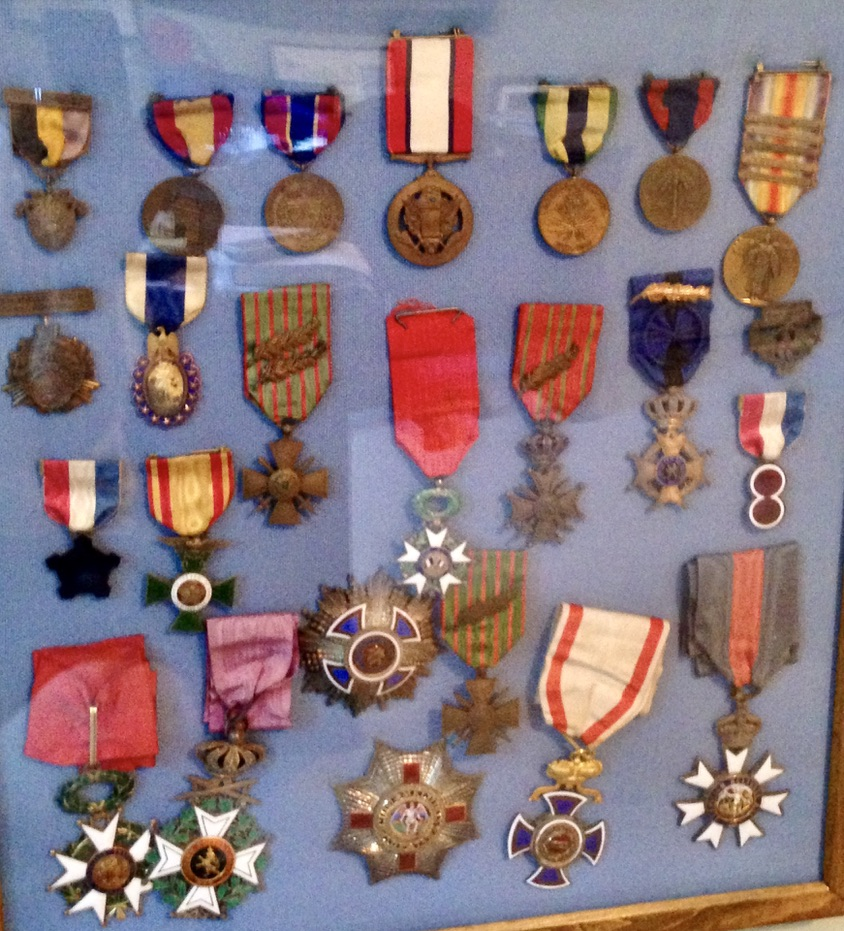
Medals and Awards for Major General Edward Mann Lewis
