= Old Times in North Yarmouth, Maine =

Historical publication by Augustus W. Corliss

- Cover of the 1977 book
- Author: Augustus W. Corliss
- Language: English
- Genre: Genealogy
- Publisher: Augustus W. Corliss
- Publication date: January 1877 to October 1884 (original magazine format); 1977 (book format)
- Publication place: United States
- Media type: Magazine; Hardback book
- ISBN: 0-912274-72-7
- OCLC: 866082456
- LC Class: 76-52883

Old Times in North Yarmouth, Maine was a quarterly publication first printed in magazine form between 1877 and 1884 by Augustus W. Corliss. It covered the history and genealogy of the town of North Yarmouth, Maine. In 1977, a century after its first edition was printed, it was published in book form by the New Hampshire Publishing Company, with Corliss' handwritten notes in the margins of some pages, written by a 19th-century reader who either agreed with or, occasionally, corrected the editor. Mrs. Edward G. Leighton, of North Yarmouth, added the expanded table of contents in this release.

Subtitled A Magazine Devoted to the Preservation and Publication of Documents Relating to the Early History of North Yarmouth, Maine, it was printed across several volumes during Corliss' military career, which spanned forty years.

Corliss published the first issue in January 1877, and overall 32 issues were published through October 1884 – an average of 4.5 issues per year. He wrote about his own family, beginning with George Corliss (born in 1617), in January 1879's volume 3, first edition.

He tried to revive the magazine, as The Westcustogo Chronicle, but only one issue made it to print before publication ceased.
