= Society of the Army of Santiago de Cuba =

Organization formed during the Spanish–American War (1898)

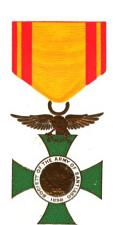
Medal of the Society of the Army of Santiago de Cuba.

Society of the Army of Santiago de Cuba was an organization, the purpose of which was to record the history and conserve the memory of the events of the campaign that began on June 14, 1898 and resulted in the surrender, on July 17, 1898, of the Spanish army, the city of Santiago de Cuba, and the military province to which it pertained during the Spanish–American War.

In order to be a member of the Society, US Army Volunteer officers and enlisted men had to have served in the Battle of Santiago, Cuba. The Society also granted membership to direct lineal descendant or descendant of a soldier killed in the battle. Becoming an honorary member was also possible to all foreign governments Military and Naval Attaches that were with the Fifth Army Corps at any time during the Santiago campaign. The enlisted members wore a bronze medal, and the officers medal was gilded enamel, both would have rank, name and membership number engraved on the back. In 1901, the Society published the “Roster of the Society of the Army of Santiago de Cuba”, listing all Officers and members of council , as well as the members of its various branches across the U.S.

In 1913 the constitution and by-laws of the Society of the Army of Santiago de Cuba was reprinted from the original published edition.

At the end of 1914, the Society of the Army of Santiago de Cuba Officers were made up of:

President Major-General Charles Dick

First Vice-President Major-General C. F. Humphrey

Second Vice-President Major-General Leonard Wood

Third Vice-President Brigadier-General A. A. Harbach

Fourth Vice-President Colonel Alfred C. Sharpe

Secretary and Treasurer Colonel Charles A. Williams

Historian Major G. Creighton Webb

Registrar-General Brigadier-General Philip Reade

First Division Registrar Colonel L. W. V. Kennon

Second Division Registrar Colonel James T. Kerr

Third Division Registrar Brigadier-General Charles Morton

Fourth Division Registrar Lieutenant-Colonel WM. D. Beach

Notable members of the Society included Colonel Theodore Roosevelt, Major General S. S. Sumner and Major General Adna R. Chaffe.

Members wrote the “Society of the Army of Santiago de Cuba” which was published by Williams printing company in Richmond Virginia in 1927. Major General J.T. Dickman was the editor.
