= General Lewis =

General Lewis may refer to:

- Andrew Lewis (soldier) (1720–1781), brigadier general in the American Revolutionary War
- Bennett L. Lewis (1926–2023), U.S. Army lieutenant general
- Charles Algernon Lewis (1807–1904), British Army general
- Duncan Lewis (born 1953), retired Australian Army general
- Edward Mann Lewis (1863–1949), U.S. Army general
- Fred P. Lewis (fl. 1970s–2000s), U.S. Air Force brigadier general
- George Lewis (Royal Marines officer) (1774–1854), Royal Marines lieutenant general
- Henry Balding Lewis (1889–1966), U.S. Army general
- Homer I. Lewis (1919–2015), U.S. Air Force major general
- John L. Lewis (politician) (1800–1886), Louisiana Militia general in the American Civil War
- John Randolph Lewis (1834–1900), Union Army brevet brigadier general
- John Taylor Lewis (1894–1983), U.S. Army general
- Joseph Horace Lewis (1824–1904), Confederate States Army general
- Kenneth Lewis (general) (c. 1929–1992), Canadian air force general
- Levin Major Lewis (1832–1886), Confederate States Army general
- Morgan Lewis (governor) (1754–1844), U.S. Army general in the War of 1812
- Patricia C. Lewis, retired U.S. Air Force general
- Robert A. Lewis (1917–1983), U.S. Army general
- Rodney D. Lewis (fl. 1990s–2020s), U.S. Air Force general
- Ronald F. Lewis (born 1966), U.S. Army lieutenant general
- William G. Lewis (1835–1901), Confederate States Army general

== See also ==
- Attorney General Lewis (disambiguation)
