= Patricia Lewis =

Patricia Lewis may refer to:

- Patricia Lewis (physicist) (born 1957), Irish nuclear physicist and arms control expert
- Patricia Lewis (singer) (born 1967), South African singer, actress and television personality
- Patricia C. Lewis, United States Air Force general
