= Attorney General Lewis =

Attorney General Lewis may refer to:

- Ellis Lewis (1798–1871), Attorney General of Pennsylvania
- Henry Roger Justin Lewis (fl. 1950s–1970s), Attorney General of Fiji
- Merton E. Lewis (1861–1937), Attorney General of New York
- Morgan Lewis (governor) (1754–1844), Attorney General of New York

== See also ==
- General Lewis (disambiguation)
