= Henry Balding Lewis =

United States Army general (1889–1966)

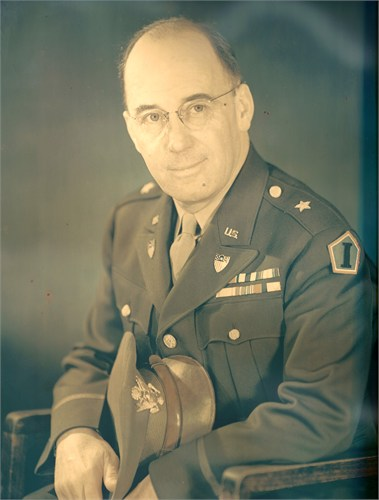
- Born: May 8, 1889; Liberty Island, United States
- Died: May 21, 1966 (aged 77); San Francisco, California, United States
- Burial place: Arlington National Cemetery
- Military career
- Allegiance: United States of America
- Branch: United States Army
- Service years: 1908–1949
- Rank: Major general
- Commands: Assistant chief of staff and adjutant general, 12th Army Group in Europe in WWII under General Omar Bradley, adjutant of the Infantry School at Fort Benning, adjutant US Military Academy West Point, adjutant general US Forces China
- Conflicts: Border War; World War I; Chinese Civil War; World War II; Operation Overlord; Battle of the Bulge; Western Allied invasion of Germany; Rhineland Offensive
- Awards: Distinguished Service Medal; Legion of Merit; Honorary investiture as a Commander of the Order of the British Empire; Legion of Honor; Bronze Star; American Defense Medal; World War I Victory Medal; World War II Victory Medal; Croix De Guerre - France with Palm; Order of Leopold II; Mexican Service Medal; American Campaign Medal; Order of Abdon Calderon; Army of Occupation Medal (Germany); European African Middle Eastern Campaign Medal with 5 Battle Stars; Commander of the Order of Orange-Nassau; Czechoslovak War Cross 1939-1945; Commander of the Order of Adolphe of Nassau; Luxembourg War Cross; Asiatic Pacific Campaign Medal; Fundacion Internacional Medal (Ecuador)

Major General Henry Balding Lewis, CBE, (May 8, 1889 – May 21, 1966) was a United States Army officer who served in the Border War, Tientsin China, World War I and World War II. He served as adjutant general, United States Military Academy at West Point, Adjutant General 1st Infantry Division at Schofield Barracks in Hawaii. In World War II he was adjutant general and deputy chief of staff to General Omar Bradley for the 12th Army Group and later served with General Bradley in the Veterans Administration.

== Biography ==
Henry Balding Lewis was born May 8, 1889, at Fort Wood located on Liberty Island, the site of the newly installed Statue of Liberty. He was the first child born at the hospital there, the son of Major General Edward Mann Lewis and Harriet Russell Balding. He entered the United States Military Academy in September 1909 and graduated in July 1913. He was commissioned as a Second Lieutenant of Infantry and served in World War I, and World War II rising to deputy chief of staff and adjutant general of the 12th Army Group under General Omar Bradley, the largest group ever constituted by the US Army. After the war he served with General Bradley in the Veterans Administration.

== Early life ==
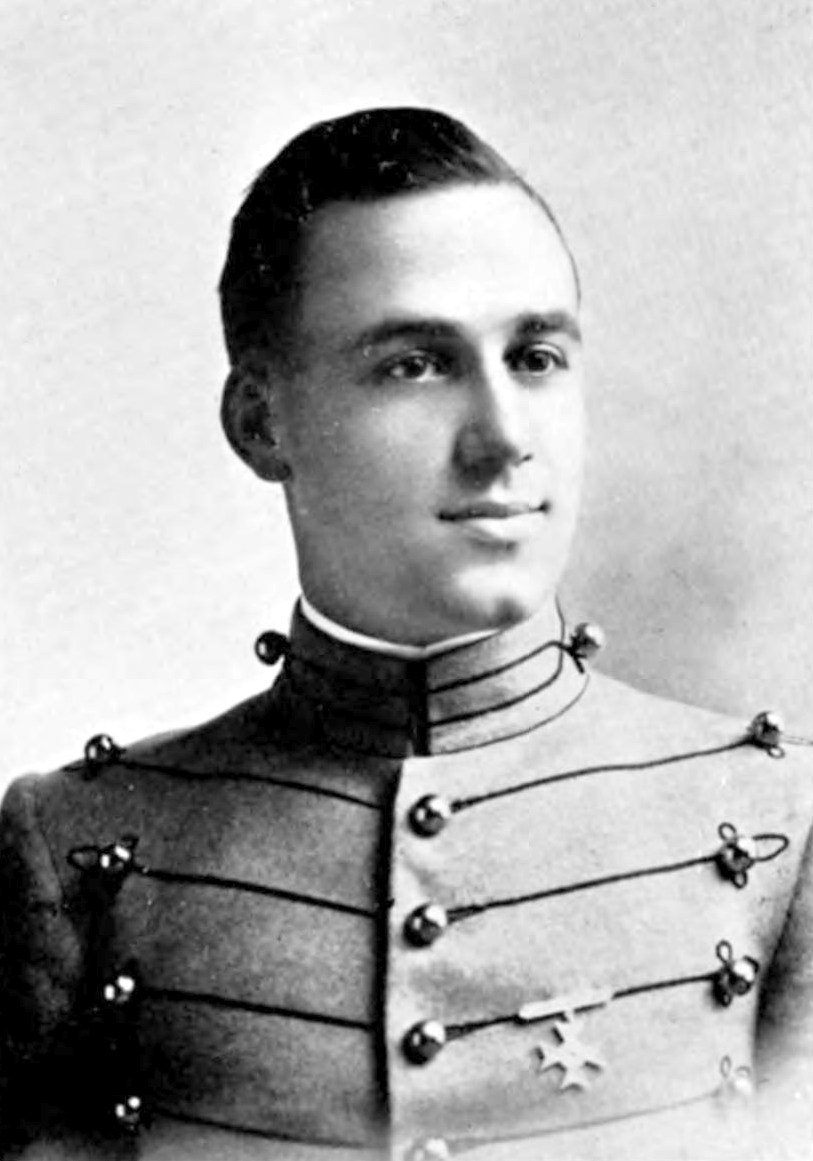
At West Point in 1913

Henry Balding Lewis, the son of Major General Edward Mann Lewis spent his early years with his family at The Presidio in San Francisco, Fort Huachuca in Arizona, and Chicago Illinois. Following in the footsteps of his father, and other Lewis family members who served in the military going back to before the American Revolution, "Monk" Lewis was selected to enter the United States Military Academy at West Point in 1909.

== Border duty ==
After graduation in 1913, he joined the 20th Infantry Regiment and served with that unit when they were transferred to El Paso Texas, to defend the border with Mexico. In 1914, he married Sara "Lally" Clitz Anderson, daughter of Major Robert Houstoun Anderson Jr, granddaughter of General Robert Houstoun Anderson of Savannah. They married at Fort Sam Houston in the base chapel. Due to his energy and organizational skills, he was promoted to assistant provost marshal and aide to Brigadier General George Bell Jr. until 1917.

== World War I ==
At the outbreak of the First World War he was serving with the 1st Infantry Regiment at Schofield Barracks in the Hawaiian Territory. To train for The Great War, the 1st Infantry Regiment was moved to Camp Lewis in Washington, where Major Lewis served as adjutant. While preparing for war, Lewis worried about his father who led the 3rd Brigade of the 2nd Infantry division, and later was in Command of the 30th Infantry Division when they broke the Hindenburg line. In 1919 Lewis returned to the Territory of Hawaii, where he served as adjutant of the Hawaiian Department. While serving there, his only child Frances Harriet Lewis was born.

== Interwar years ==
After the war, the family returned to the mainland for a short stint at Fort Pike, Arkansas with the 3rd Division. In 1921, they moved west again as Lewis served as the assistant adjutant of the 2nd Division at Camp Travis, Fort Sam Houston. While there he served with his father, the commander of the Eighth Corps Area, Major General Edward Mann Lewis. This would be the last time he would share the same duty station with his father. While there, they witnessed the birth of Army aviation, and helped transition the cavalry to a mechanized force.

On May 16, 1922, Lewis was transferred to the United States Army Adjutant General's Corps. His next duty station was at the United States Military Academy where he was adjutant of the academy, serving under superintendent Douglas MacArthur only 10 years after his graduation. MacArthur instituted reforms to the academic process, including introducing a greater emphasis on history and humanities. He made major changes to the field training regimen and the Cadet Honor Committee was formed under his watch. MacArthur was a firm supporter of athletics at the academy, as he famously said "Upon the fields of friendly strife are sown the seeds that, upon other fields, on other days, will bear the fruits of victory".

During his time at the academy, Lewis was the technical advisor for a silent movie shot on campus. Classmates was directed by John S. Robertson and was released in 1924.

== Tianjin (Tientsin) China ==
After spending 4 years at the academy, he joined the 15th Infantry Regiment in Tianjin (Tientsin), China, serving as adjutant general, US Forces in China from 1926 to 1929. Much of the 15th Infantry's tradition comes from the 26 years in China. The dragon on the regimental crest and the pidgin English motto "Can Do" symbolize its China service. Also many of the ceremonial properties of the 15th are from China, for example, the grand silver punch bowl with accessories. These are all held in the China Room at Fort Benning. His father, Major General Edward Mann Lewis Commanded the Hawaiian Department at this time, and he visited Tianjin while on an inspection tour, before he retired in 1927. "Monk" Lewis was then assigned as Adjutant General of the Infantry School at Fort Benning, Georgia until 1935, when he was transferred to Fort Leavenworth Kansas to attend the Command & General Staff School (now called the Army War College). In 1940 he was promoted to adjutant-general, Western Defense Command (4th Army Group) at The Presidio of San Francisco until 1942.

== World War II ==
From 1942 to 1943 he served as assistant adjutant – General of the Army in Washington, D.C., before joining the 12th Army Group in Europe to help plan operation Overlord, the Normandy Invasion in 1944. During the planning of the invasion, and in subsequent operations in France and Germany, he established and integrated the Adjutant General Section of Headquarters, United States Army Adjutant General's Corps and formulated the policies that the department would operate under. His untiring efforts, leadership, tact and sound judgment were largely responsible for the efficient operation of the command. He served as Omar Bradley's deputy chief of staff and adjutant general until the end of the war.

The Twelfth United States Army Group was the largest and most powerful United States Army formation ever to take to the field. It controlled the majority of American forces on the Western Front in 1944 and 1945. It was commanded by General Omar Bradley with its headquarters established in London on July 14, 1944.

Bradley's First United States Army, which later formed part of the Twelfth Army Group, formed the right wing of the Allied lines during the Normandy landings and the Battle of Normandy. They were joined during July by the Third United States Army, under the command of General George Patton. Until September, when General Dwight D. Eisenhower assumed overall command of the Allied land forces in Northwest Europe, the U.S. forces in Normandy were included with the British Second Army and the First Canadian Army in the British headquarters formation 21st Army Group, commanded by Field Marshal Bernard Montgomery.

After the breakout from the beach-head at Normandy, the Twelfth Army Group formed the center of the Allied forces on the Western Front. To the north was the British 21st Army Group (the 2 aforementioned field armies) and, to the south, advancing from their landing on the Mediterranean coast, was the Sixth United States Army Group (Seventh United States Army and French First Army).

As the Twelfth advanced through Germany in 1945, it controlled four field armies: First United States Army, Third United States Army, Ninth United States Army and Fifteenth United States Army. By V-E Day, the Twelfth Army Group was a force that numbered over 1.7 million men. For his exceptionally meritorious service as adjutant general, Lewis was made an Honorary Commander of the Order of the British Empire after being recommended by both General Omar Bradley and Field Marshal Bernard Montgomery.

== After the war ==
In 1946, he was appointed director of organization, coordination and planning at the Veterans Administration, again serving under General Omar Bradley. His last duty station was also in Washington, D.C., serving as the Assistant Adjutant General of the Army, and chief of Personnel Bureau, Office of the Adjutant General. He retired on May 31, 1949, serving the nation for 41 years of his life. He died on May 21, 1966, in San Francisco, California, and was buried at Arlington National Cemetery with his wife, Sarah Clitz Anderson. His only child, Frances Harriet Lewis married Colonel Frank Henry Stone in 1942, and they were both eventually interred alongside General Lewis in Arlington.

== Decorations ==
| Army Distinguished Service Medal |
| Legion of Merit |
| Bronze Star Medal |
| Mexican Border Service Medal |
| World War I Victory Medal |
| American Defense Service Medal |
| American Campaign Medal |
| European–African–Middle Eastern Campaign Medal with Five Battle Stars |
| World War II Victory Medal |
| Army of Occupation Medal |
| Asiatic–Pacific Campaign Medal |
| Honorary Commander, Order of the British Empire (Military) |
| Officer of the Legion of Honor (France) |
| Croix de Guerre (France) |
| Commander, Order of Leopold II (Belgium) |
| Commander, Order of Orange-Nassau (Netherlands) |
| Commander, Order of Adolphe of Nassau (Luxembourg) |
| Luxembourg War Cross (Luxembourg) |
| Order of Abdon Calderón (Ecuador) |
| Czechoslovak War Cross 1939–1945 (Czechoslovakia) |

== Gallery ==
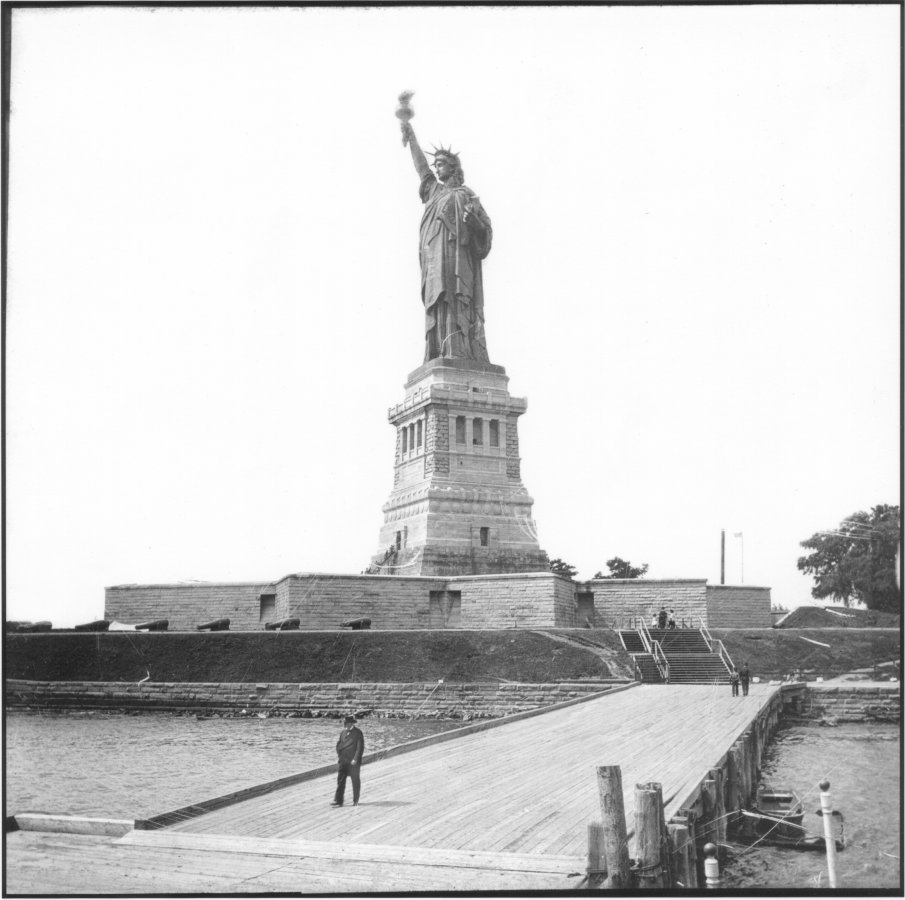
The Birthplace of HBL – Fort Wood in New York Harbor

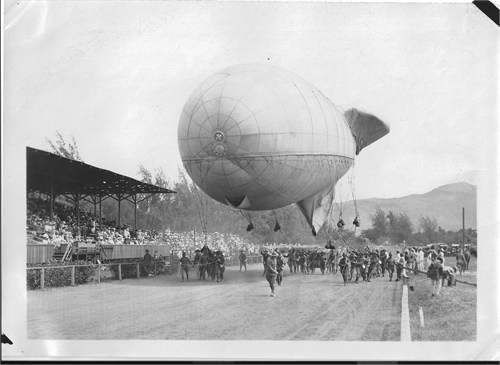
USMA barrage balloon in 1912

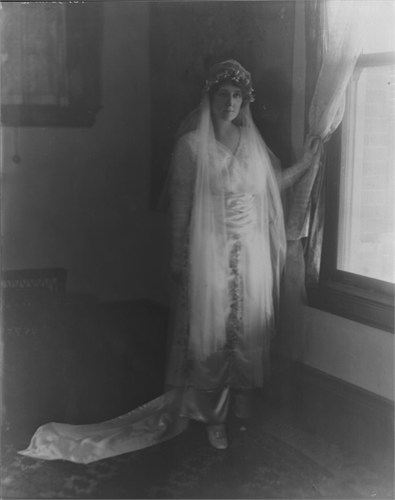
Sally Clitz Anderson Lewis "Lallie" on her wedding day to HBL July 1914 at Fort Sam Houston, Texas

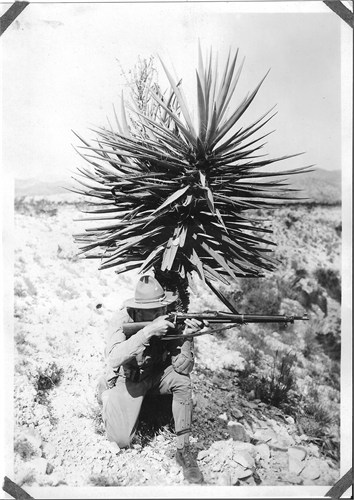
US 20th Infantry Regiment Soldier in Mexico 1916

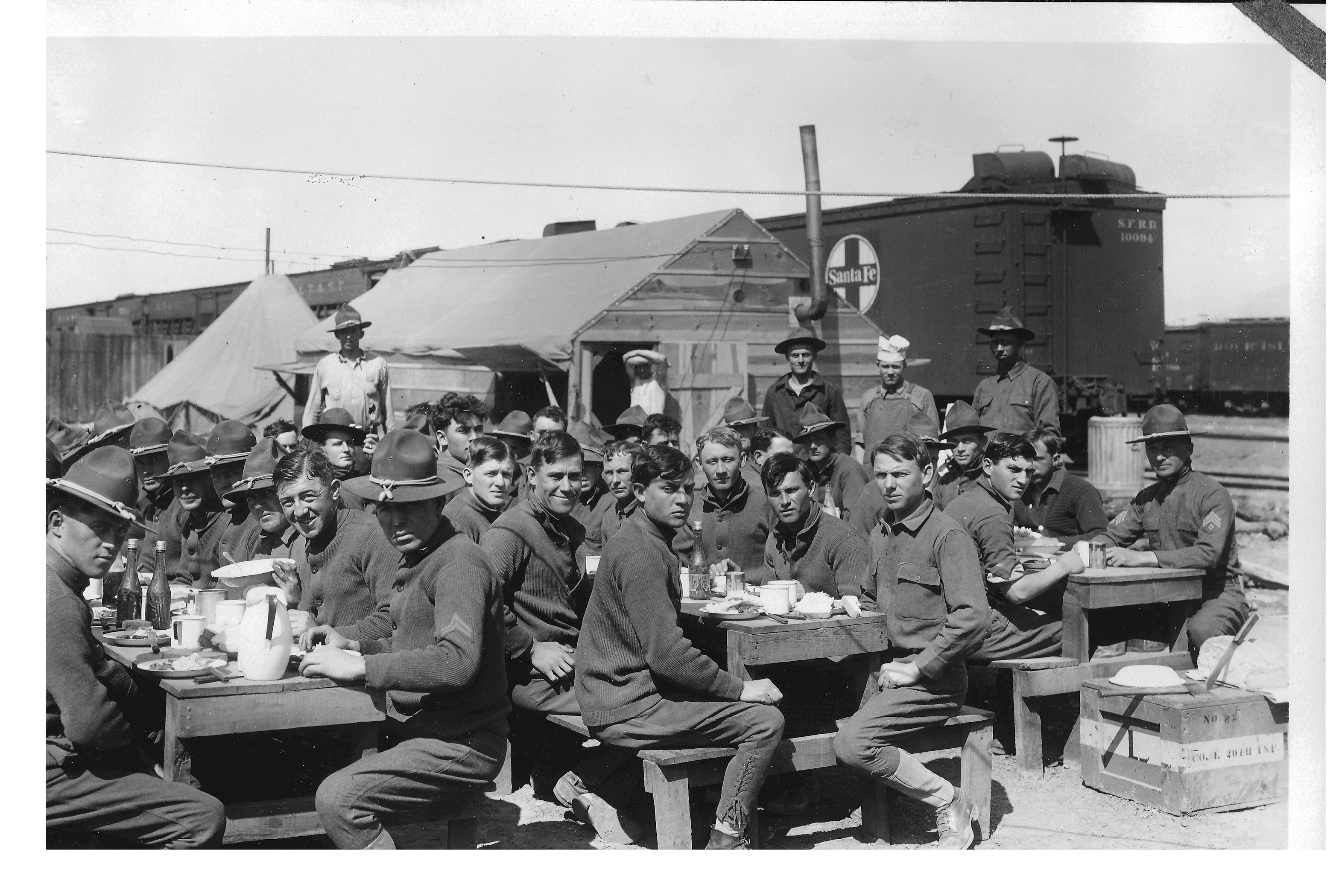
20th Infantry Regiment on the Border in 1916

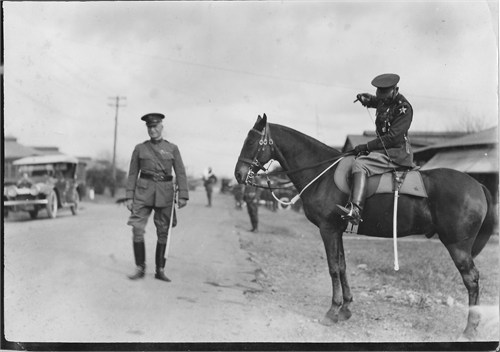
Major General Edward Mann Lewis and son HBL (on horse) at Fort Travis, Texas in 1922

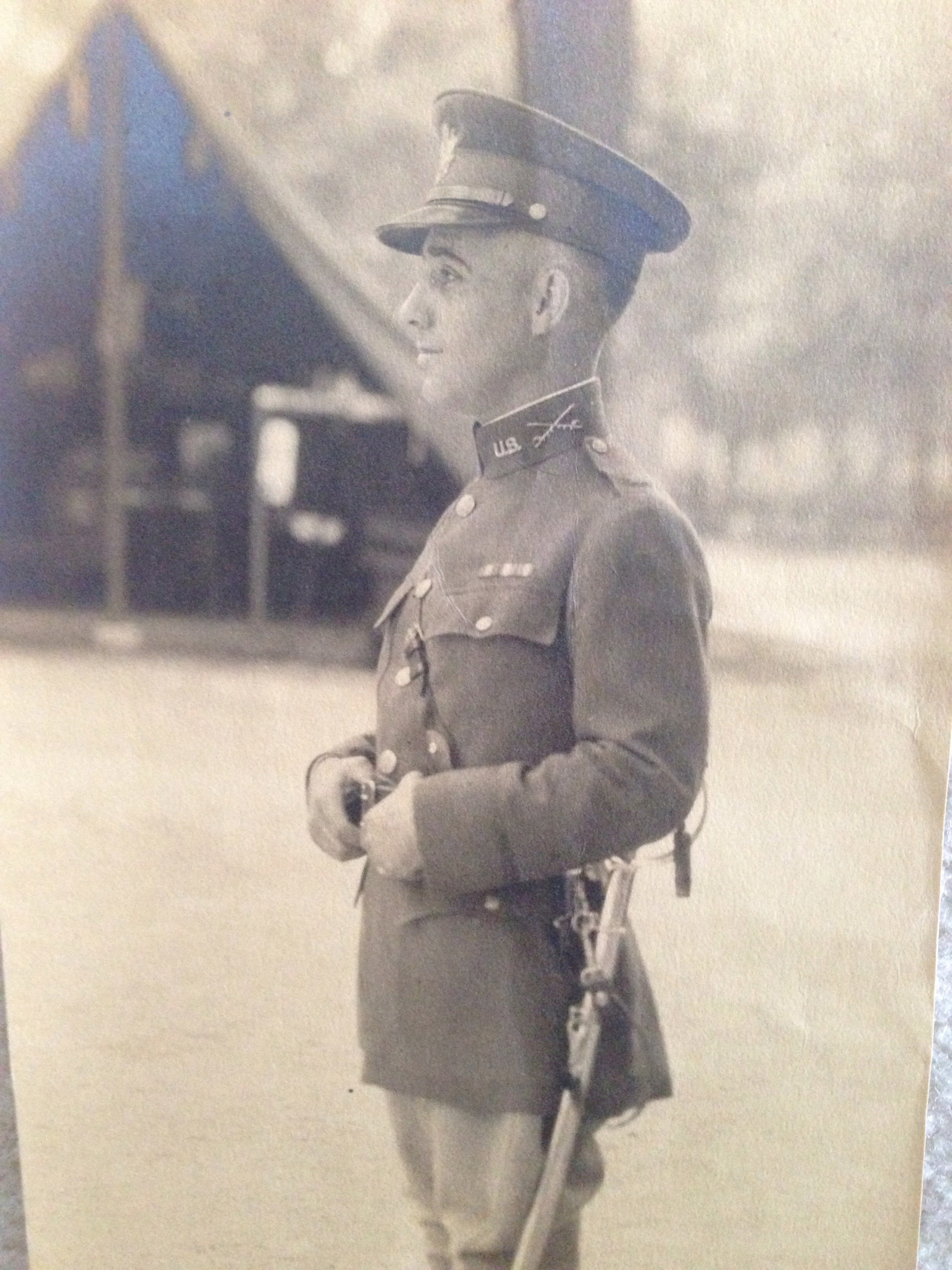
HBL as adjutant, US Military Academy at West Point 1923

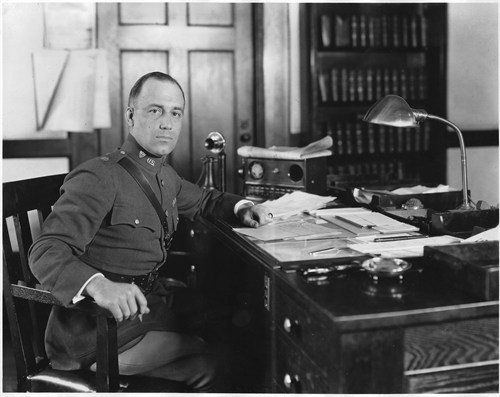
HBL at his desk

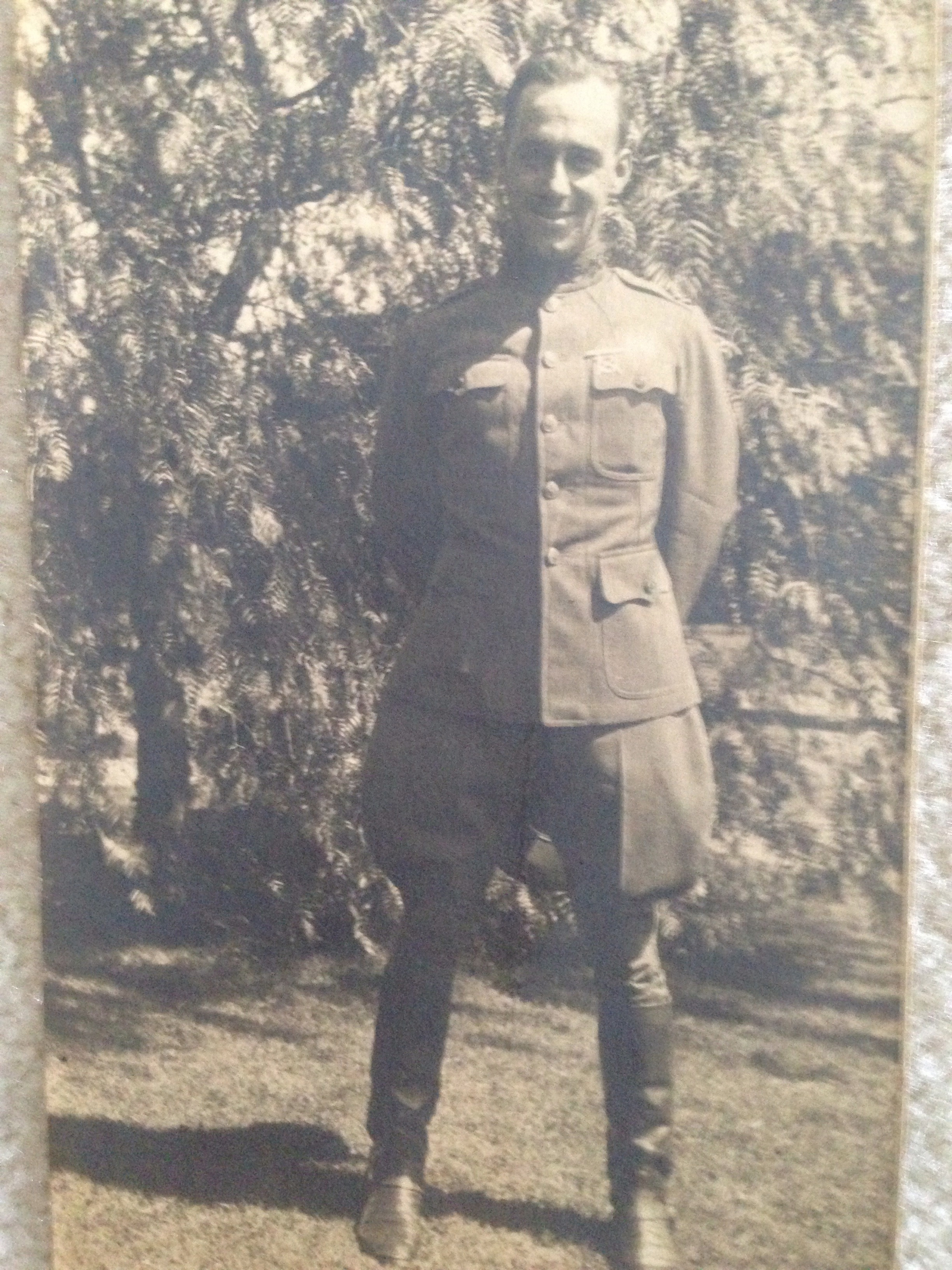
HBL in China with the 15th Infantry Regiment in 1927

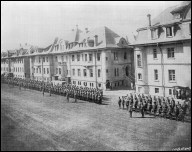
15th Infantry Regiment formed up in front of the former German barracks in Tietsin, China in 1927 – HBL was adjutant, US Army Forces in China

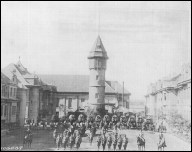
15th Infantry Regiment in Tietsin, China in 1927 – HBL was adjutant, US Army Forces in China

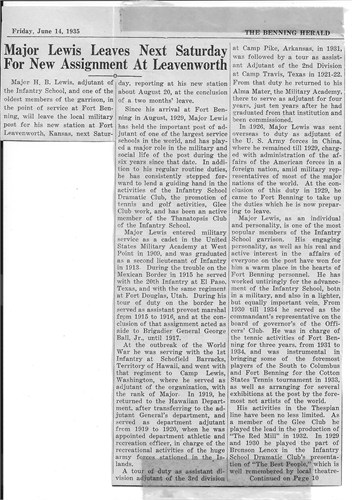
Fort Benning Herald article on HBL 1935

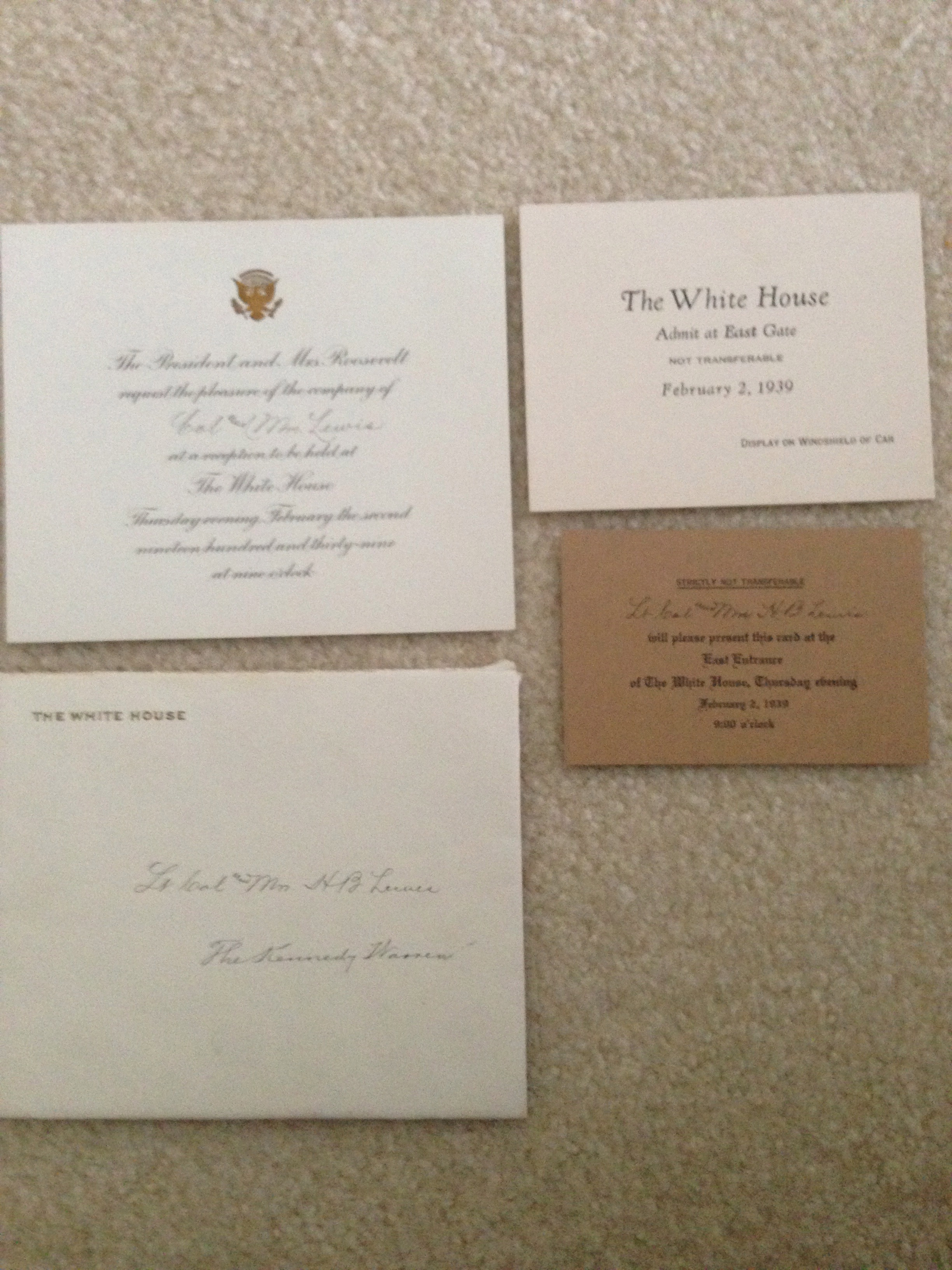
White House invitation from President and Mrs. Roosevelt

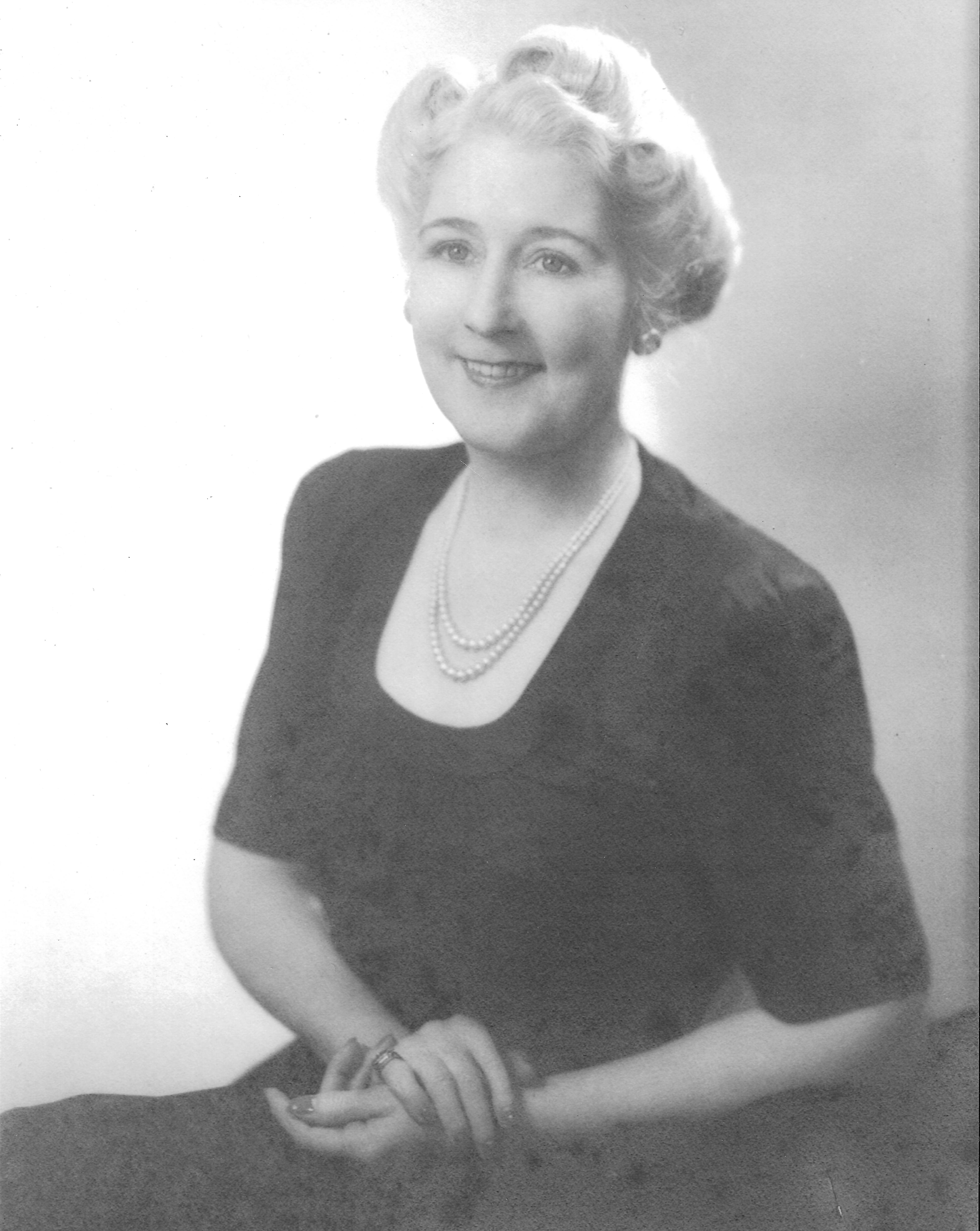
Sara "Lally" Clitz Anderson Lewis – wife of General Henry Balding Lewis

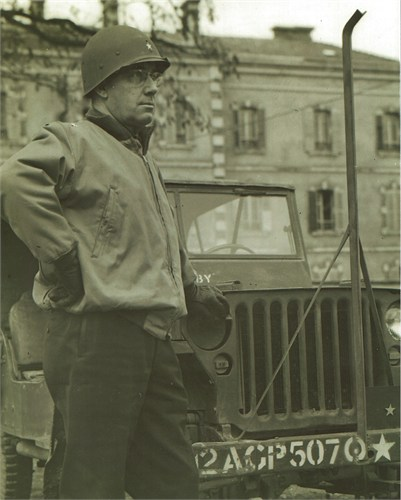
General Lewis with his Jeep in World War II

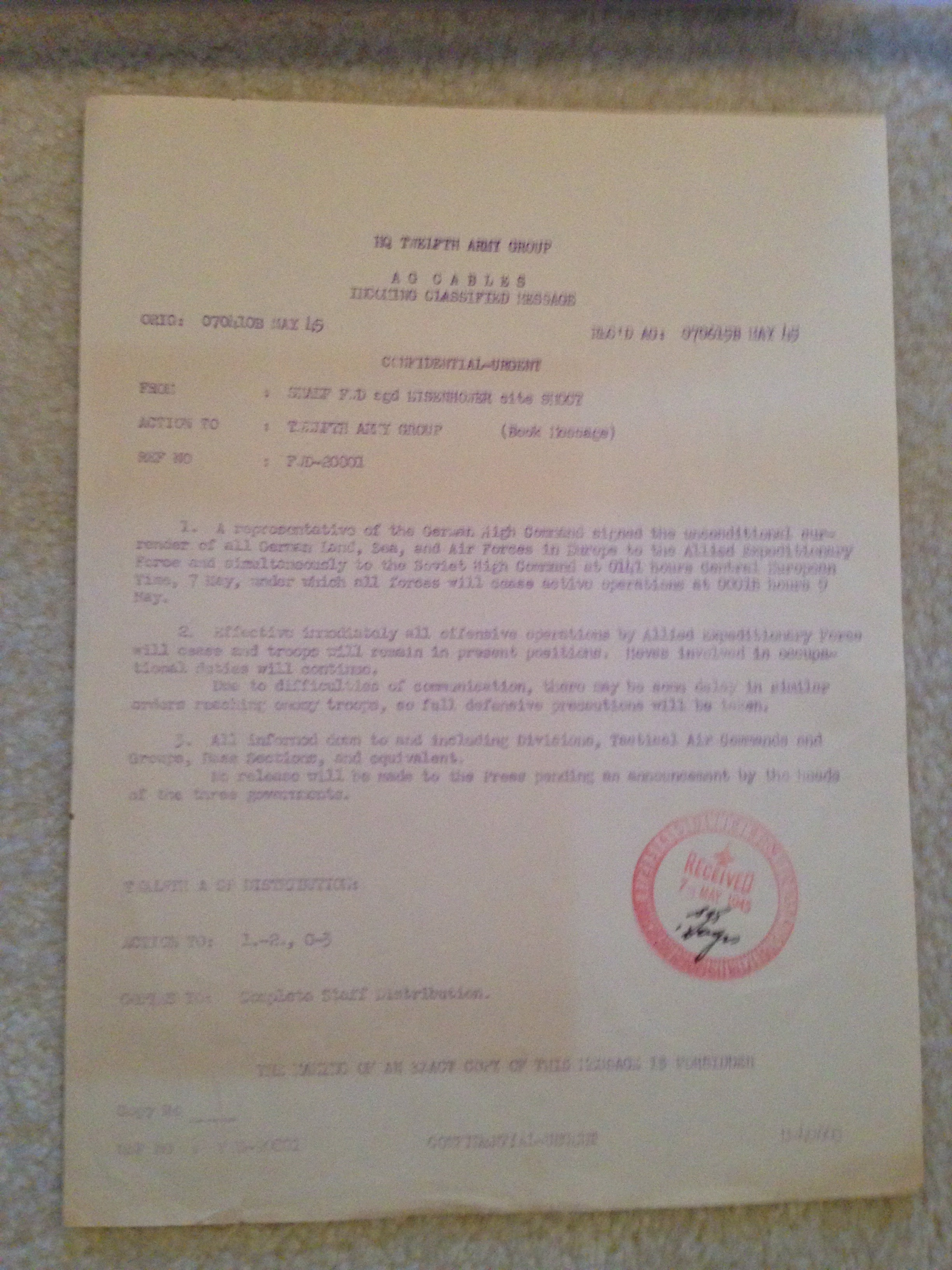
12th Army Group cable announcing the surrender of Germany in 1945

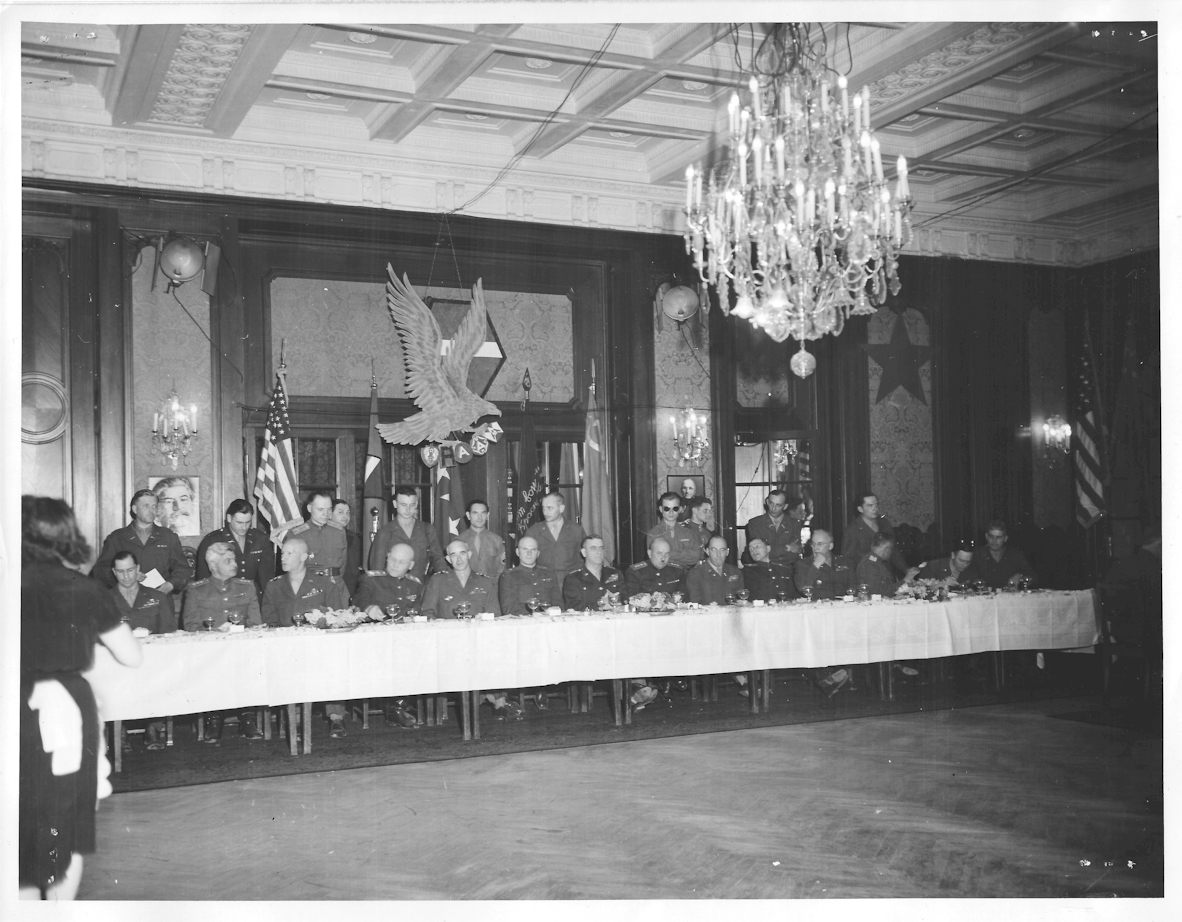
HBL and the 12th Army Group meets Soviets for dinner at the end of World War II

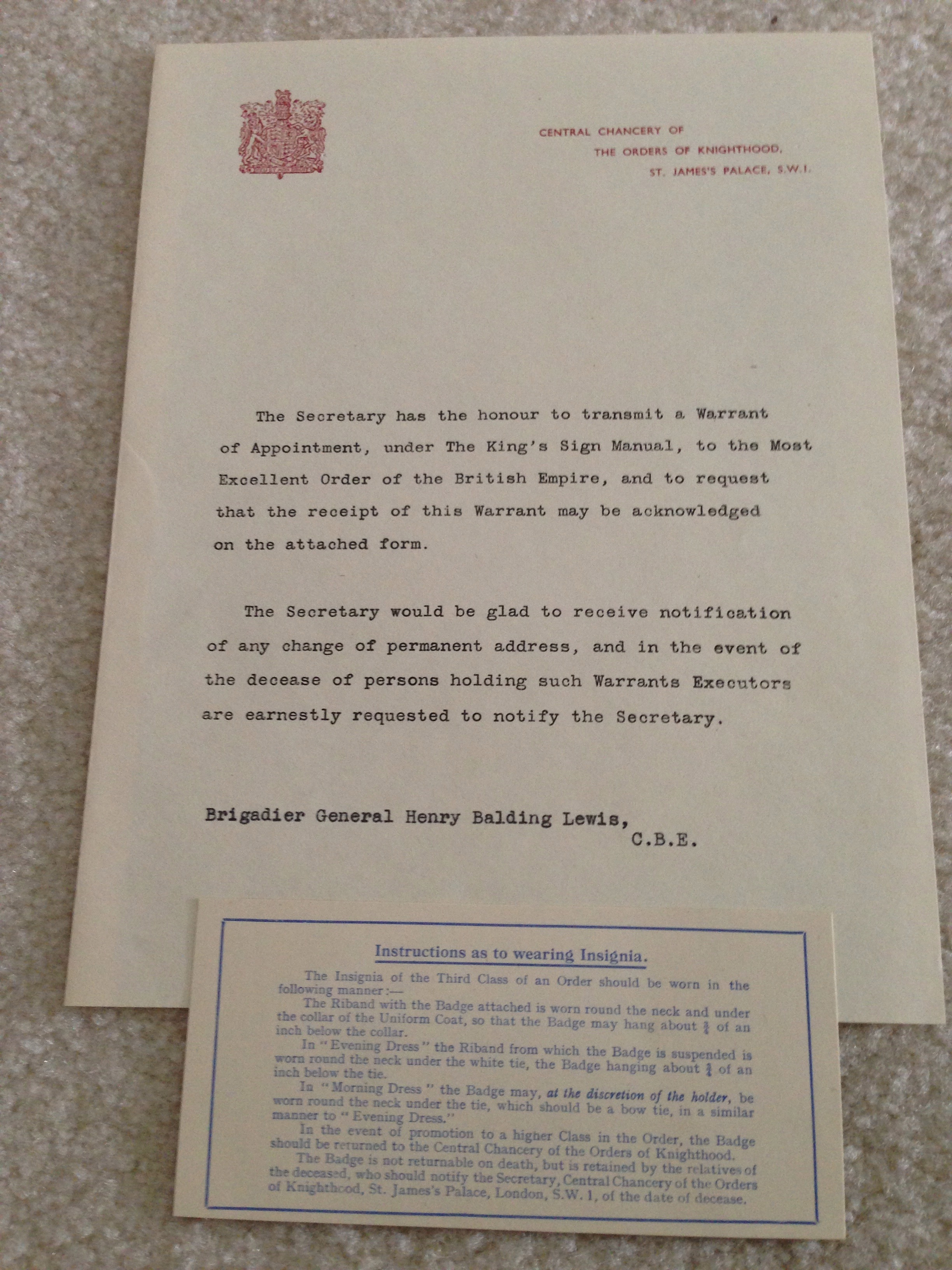
Warrant Raising HBL to Knight Commander of the Order of the British Empire (CBE)

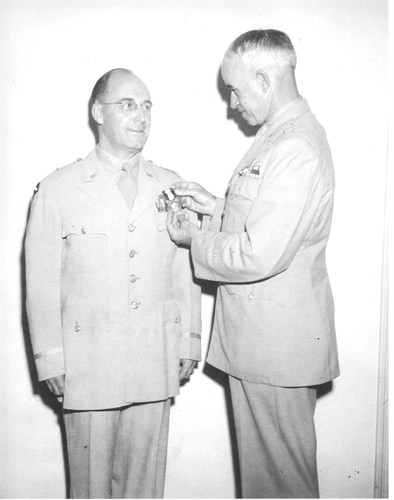
General Omar Bradley Awards DSM to HBL

12th Army Group Report of Operations Final After Action Report Volume 1

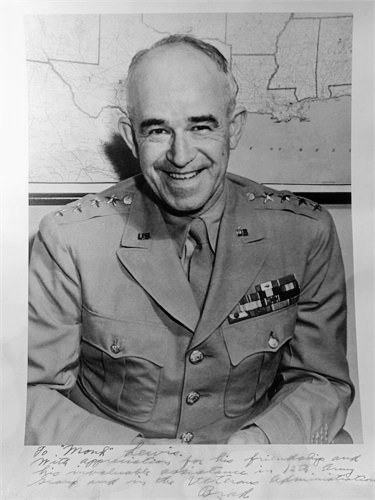
Bradley Signed to HBL thanking him for his service in World War II and the VA

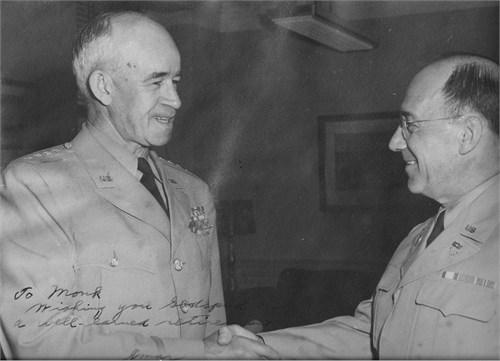
HBL and Gen Bradley signed photograph upon retirement

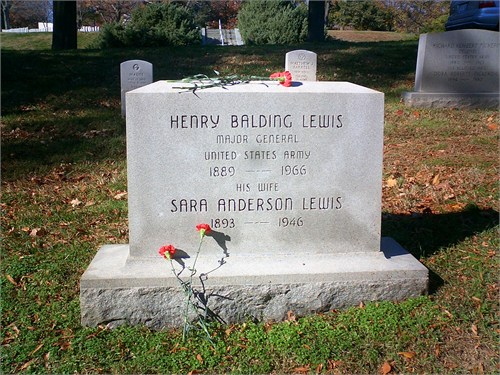
HBL gravesite at Arlington National Cemetery

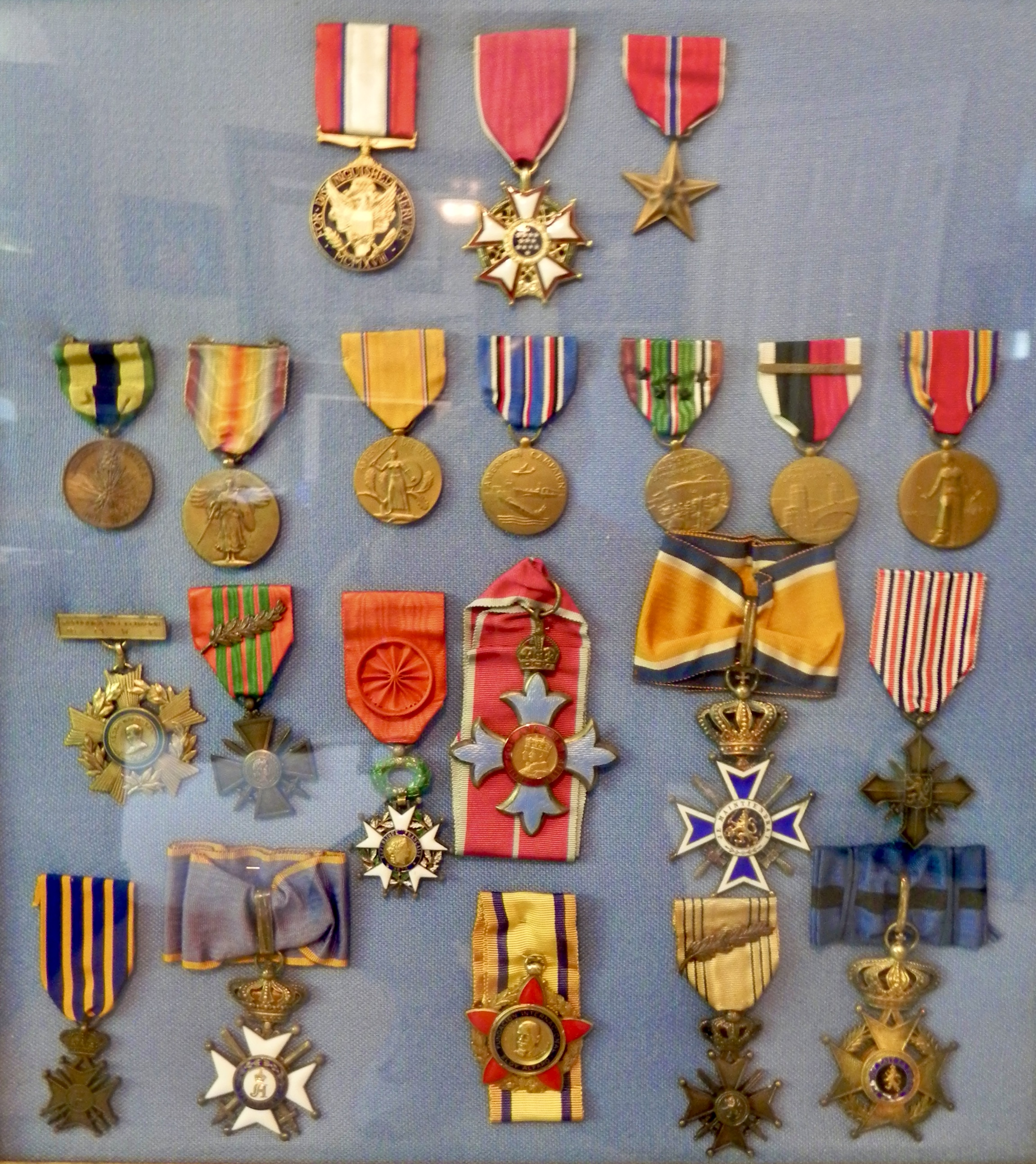
Medals and awards for Major Henry Balding Lewis
