= Patricia C. Lewis =

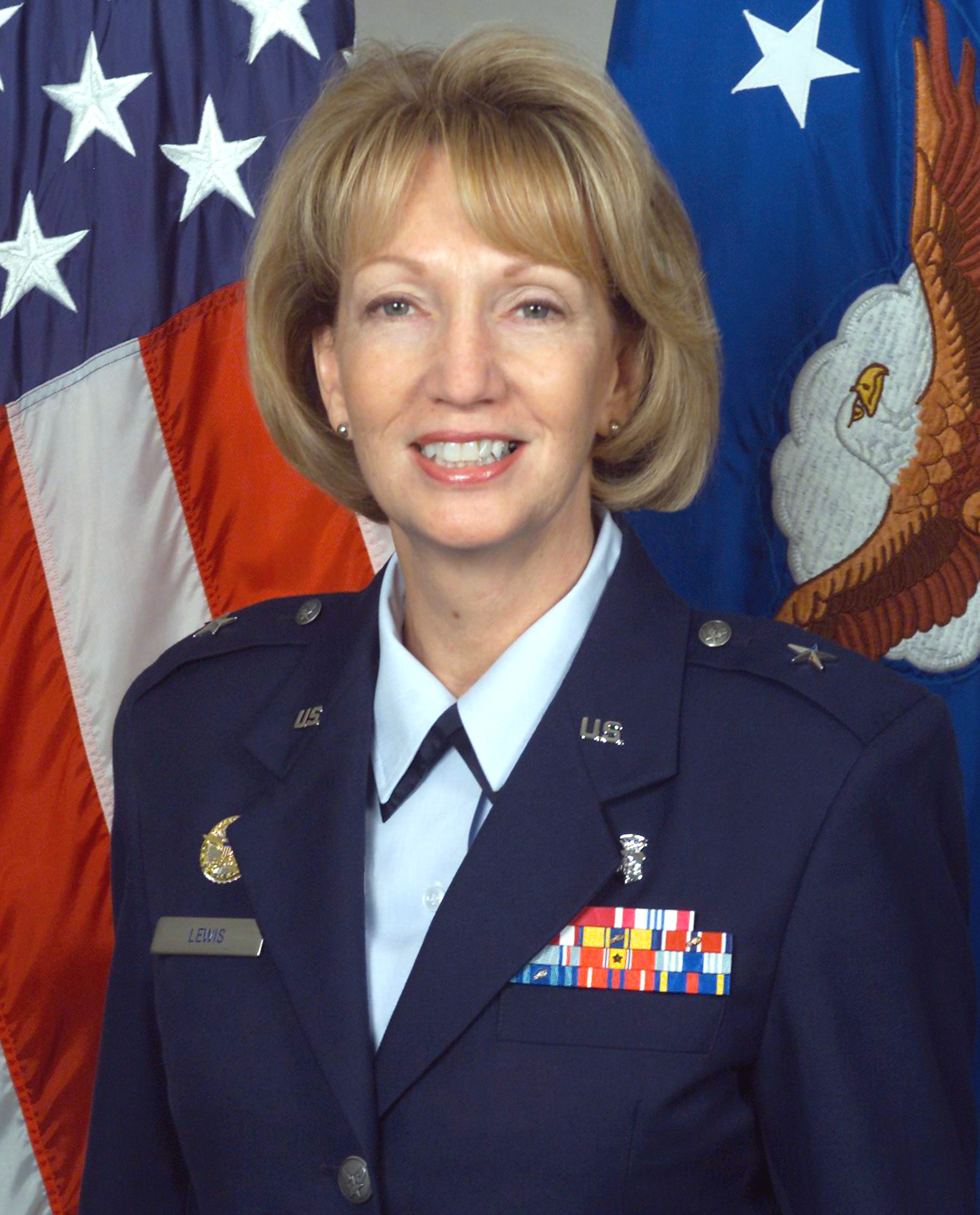
- U.S. Air Force Photo
- Military career
- Branch: United States Air Force
- Service years: 1977–2009
- Rank: Brigadier General
- Unit: Surgeon General,
- Awards: Legion of Merit; Defense Meritorious Service Medal; Meritorious Service Medal(6); Air Force Commendation Medal(2)

Brigadier General Patricia C. Lewis was Assistant Surgeon General, Medical Plans and Programs, and Chief of the Medical Service Corps, Office of the Surgeon General, Bolling Air Force Base, D.C. As the Air Force Medical Service senior programmer, General Lewis’ key responsibilities were integrating, analyzing and defending the Defense Health Program and medical elements of Air Force funding during the Program Objective Memoranda, Program Budget Decision and Program Decision Memorandum. She provided expert consultative leadership for all of the Air Force Medical Service. The Medical Service supports the activities of 39,000 personnel serving 2.6 million beneficiaries through 75 medical treatment facilities worldwide with a budget of $6.3 billion. In her dual role as Chief of the Medical Service Corps, General Lewis was the senior healthcare administrator in the Air Force and responsible for accessions, development and management of 1,100 healthcare administrative professionals in the corps.

General Lewis was born in Highland Park, Michigan. She earned a Bachelor of Arts degree in social sciences and a Master of Arts degree in education administration from the University of the Philippines Manila. In 1979, she received a direct commission in the Air Force Medical Service Corps as a second lieutenant. She is board certified in healthcare management through the American Academy of Medical Administrators.

General Lewis has served at Headquarters Air Force Materiel Command as Chief of Programs and Evaluations in the Office of the Command Surgeon, and at Headquarters U.S. Air Force as Chief of Personnel, Training and Medical Programs. She has also served as executive officer to the Air Force Surgeon General and Director of Medical Operations for Headquarters Air Force Inspection Agency. Her commands include the 1st Medical Support Squadron at Langley AFB, Virginia, and 366th Medical Group at Mountain Home AFB, Idaho. Prior to her current assignment, General Lewis was Commander of the Air Force Medical Support Agency, a field operating agency which reports to the Air Force Surgeon General. General Lewis retired from the USAF on August 1, 2009.

== Education ==
- 1977 Bachelor of Arts degree in social sciences, University of the Philippines Manila
- 1979 Master of Arts degree in education administration, University of the Philippines Manila
- 1987 Squadron Officer School, by correspondence
- 1993 Air Command and Staff College, by correspondence
- 1996 Air War College, by correspondence

== Assignments ==
- Enlisted Finance technician.
- 1. July 1979 – October 1979, student, Health Services Administrator Course, Sheppard AFB, Texas
- 2. October 1979 – April 1982, Director, Medical Resource Management, and Director, Medical Logistics, Wurtsmith AFB, Mich.
- 3. May 1982 – January 1986, Director, Medical Resource Management, and Administrator, Hospital Services, Carswell AFB, Texas
- 4. February 1986 – February 1987, health financial management staff officer, Office of the Air Force Surgeon General, Bolling AFB, D.C.
- 5. March 1987 – July 1990, senior health systems analyst and division chief, Joint Manpower Office, Office of the Secretary of Defense for Health Affairs, the Pentagon, Washington, D.C.
- 6. August 1990 – June 1995, Chief, Programs and Evaluations, Office of the Command Surgeon, Headquarters Air Force Materiel Command, Wright-Patterson AFB, Ohio
- 7. June 1995 – June 1996, Chief, Personnel, Training and Medical Programs, Headquarters U.S. Air Force, Washington, D.C.
- 8. July 1996 – February 1999, executive officer for the Air Force Surgeon General, Bolling AFB, D.C.
- 9. February 1999 – August 2000, Commander, 1st Medical Support Squadron, Langley AFB, Va.
- 10. September 2000 – September 2001, Commander, 366th Medical Group, Mountain Home AFB, Idaho
- 11. October 2001 – March 2003, Director of Medical Operations, Headquarters Air Force Inspection Agency, Kirtland AFB, N.M.
- 12. April 2003 – April 2004, Commander, Air Force Medical Support Agency, Bolling AFB, D.C.
- 13. May 2004 – August 2009, Assistant Surgeon General, Medical Plans and Programs, and Chief of the Medical Service Corps, Office of the Surgeon General, Bolling AFB, D.C.

== Badges ==
- Chief Medical Service Corps Badge

== Other Achievements ==
1994 Commitment to Self Award

== Effective dates of promotion ==
- Airman Basic: 1977
- Second Lieutenant: June 8, 1979
- First Lieutenant: June 8, 1981
- Captain: June 8, 1983
- Major: January 1, 1990
- Lieutenant Colonel: February 1, 1995
- Colonel: October 1, 1998
- Brigadier General: October 1, 2005
