= Frederic Dahl Evans =

United States Army general (1866–1853)

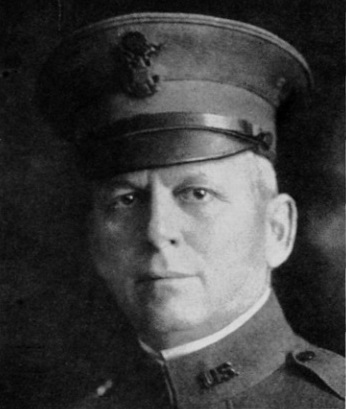
- From the January 1954 edition of Assembly magazine
- Born: June 29, 1866; Ottawa, Illinois, US
- Died: May 1, 1953 (aged 86); Walter Reed Army Medical Center, Washington, D.C., US
- Burial place: Arlington National Cemetery
- Spouse(s): Winona Anderson (m. 1893–1925, her death); Sarah Page (m. 1927–1953, his death)
- Children: 1
- Relatives: Lynden Evans (brother)
- Military career
- Allegiance: United States
- Branch: United States Army
- Service years: 1887–1924
- Rank: Brigadier general
- Service number: 0-202
- Unit: U.S. Army Infantry Branch
- Commands: 152nd Infantry Brigade, 76th Division; 156th Infantry Brigade, 78th Division; 55th Infantry Brigade, 28th Division
- Conflicts: Spanish–American War • Battle of Manila (1898); Philippine–American War; World War I

Frederic Dahl Evans (June 29, 1866 – May 1, 1953) was a United States Army officer in the late 19th and early 20th centuries. He served in the Spanish–American War, Philippine–American War, and World War I.

== Biography ==
Evans was born on June 29, 1866, in Ottawa, Illinois. His siblings included Lynden Evans. He graduated 56th in a class of 64 from the United States Military Academy in 1887 and was commissioned into the 22nd Infantry Regiment. Among his classmates included several men who would later rise to the rank of brigadier general or higher in their military careers. They included: Charles B. Wheeler, Edward C. Young, Richmond P. Davis, Edgar Russel, George O. Squier, Ernest Hinds, George W. Gatchell, Charles H. Martin, P. D. Lochridge, Nathaniel F. McClure, William C. Rivers, William Weigel, Thomas G. Hanson, Herman Hall, Marcus D. Cronin, Alexander L. Dade, Charles S. Farnsworth, Charles Gerhardt, James T. Dean, Ulysses G. McAlexander, Edmund Wittenmyer, Michael J. Lenihan, Mark L. Hersey and Frank H. Albright.

Between 1887 and 1889, Evans did frontier duty. In addition to the 22nd, Evans served on the 20th, 18th, 17th, and the 4th Infantry Regiment, and until 1892, he commanded Seminole scouts. He served at Fort Bliss from 1893 to 1898. That year, Evans and his regiment went to the Philippines due to the Spanish–American War, and later the Philippine–American War. Among other battles, he participated in the Battle of Manila, and he served as an adjutant on one expedition. Evans returned to the Philippines again between 1903 and 1905. Evans graduated from the United States Army War College in 1906, and he served at Fort Leavenworth as a member of the Infantry Examining Board between 1906 and 1907.

After Evans's promotion to the rank of brigadier general on August 5, 1917, he became the commander of 152nd Infantry Brigade, 76th Division at Fort Devens. He traveled to France due to World War I and commanded 156th Infantry Brigade, 78th Division. In October he was assigned to command 55th Infantry Brigade, 28th Division. Evans reverted to his permanent rank of colonel on November 27, 1918, and he retired from the army in 1924. Congress restored his brigadier general rank in June 1930.

Evans died at Walter Reed Army Medical Center on May 1, 1953. He is buried at Arlington National Cemetery.

== Family ==
In 1893, Evans married Winona Anderson, who died in 1925. In 1927 he married Sarah Page. With his second wife, Evans was the father of a daughter, Eleanor.

== Bibliography ==
- Davis, Henry Blaine Jr. (1998). Generals in Khaki. Raleigh, NC: Pentland Press. ISBN 1571970886. OCLC 40298151.
- Marquis Who's Who (1975). Who Was Who In American History – The Military. Chicago, Illinois: Marquis Who's Who. ISBN 0837932017.
