= Charles Gerhardt =

Charles Gerhardt may refer to:

- Charles Frédéric Gerhardt (1816–1856), French chemist
- Charles H. Gerhardt (1895–1976), American general
- Charles Gerhardt (conductor) (1927–1999), American conductor
- Charles Gerhardt (United States Army officer) (1863–1957), United States Army officer
