= Mark L. Hersey =

U.S. Army general, commanded 4th Division in World War I

Mark Leslie Hersey
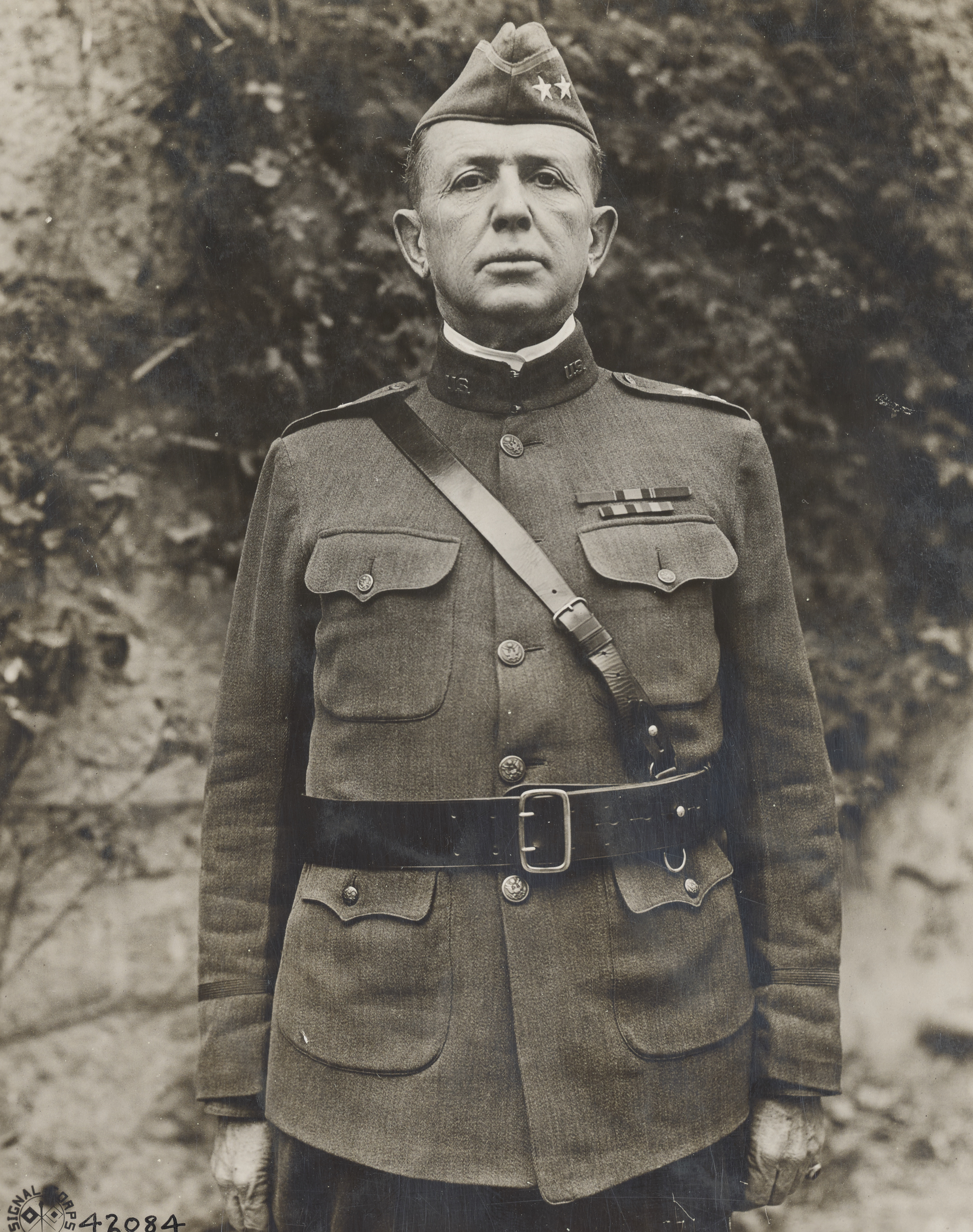
- Major General Mark L. Hersey
- Born: December 1, 1863; Stetson, Maine
- Died: January 22, 1934 (aged 70); Tampa, Florida
- Burial place: Arlington National Cemetery
- Military career
- Allegiance: United States
- Branch: United States Army
- Service years: 1887–1924
- Rank: Major General
- Service number: 0-224
- Unit: Infantry Branch
- Commands: Philippine Constabulary; 4th Division
- Conflicts: Spanish–American War: Santiago Campaign; Philippine–American War; Boxer Rebellion; World War I
- Awards: Army Distinguished Service Medal; Légion d'honneur (France); Croix de guerre (France)

Mark Leslie Hersey (December 1, 1863 – January 22, 1934) was a major general in the United States Army who commanded the 4th Division during World War I.

== Early life and education ==
Hersey was born in Maine on December 1, 1863, the son of George L. Hersey, and attended the United States Military Academy at West Point from 1883 to 1887. Prior to attending West Point, he received a Bachelor of Arts degree from Bates College. He graduated 59th of 64 from West Point on June 12, 1887, and was commissioned as a second lieutenant the same day. Among his classmates included several general officers of the future, including Charles B. Wheeler, Edward C. Young, Richmond P. Davis, Edgar Russel, George O. Squier, Ernest Hinds, George W. Gatchell, Charles H. Martin, P. D. Lochridge, Nathaniel F. McClure, William C. Rivers, William Weigel, Thomas G. Hanson, Herman Hall, Marcus D. Cronin, Alexander L. Dade, Charles S. Farnsworth, Charles Gerhardt, James T. Dean, Ulysses G. McAlexander, Edmund Wittenmyer, Frederic D. Evans, Michael J. Lenihan and Frank H. Albright.

He was promoted to first lieutenant in 1894.

== Wars and conflicts ==
He was a veteran of the Spanish–American War and served as a quartermaster for the 12th Infantry in the Fifth Army Corps in the Santiago Campaign.

Hersey was promoted to captain in 1899 and served as part of the China Relief Expedition during the Boxer Rebellion. In 1902, he received a Master of Arts degree from Bates College. Following the Philippine Insurrection, Hersey served as a colonel with the Philippine Constabulary for ten years.

Hersey was promoted to major in 1911 and to lieutenant colonel in 1916. He served under General John J. Pershing during the punitive expedition in Mexico in 1916.

== First World War ==
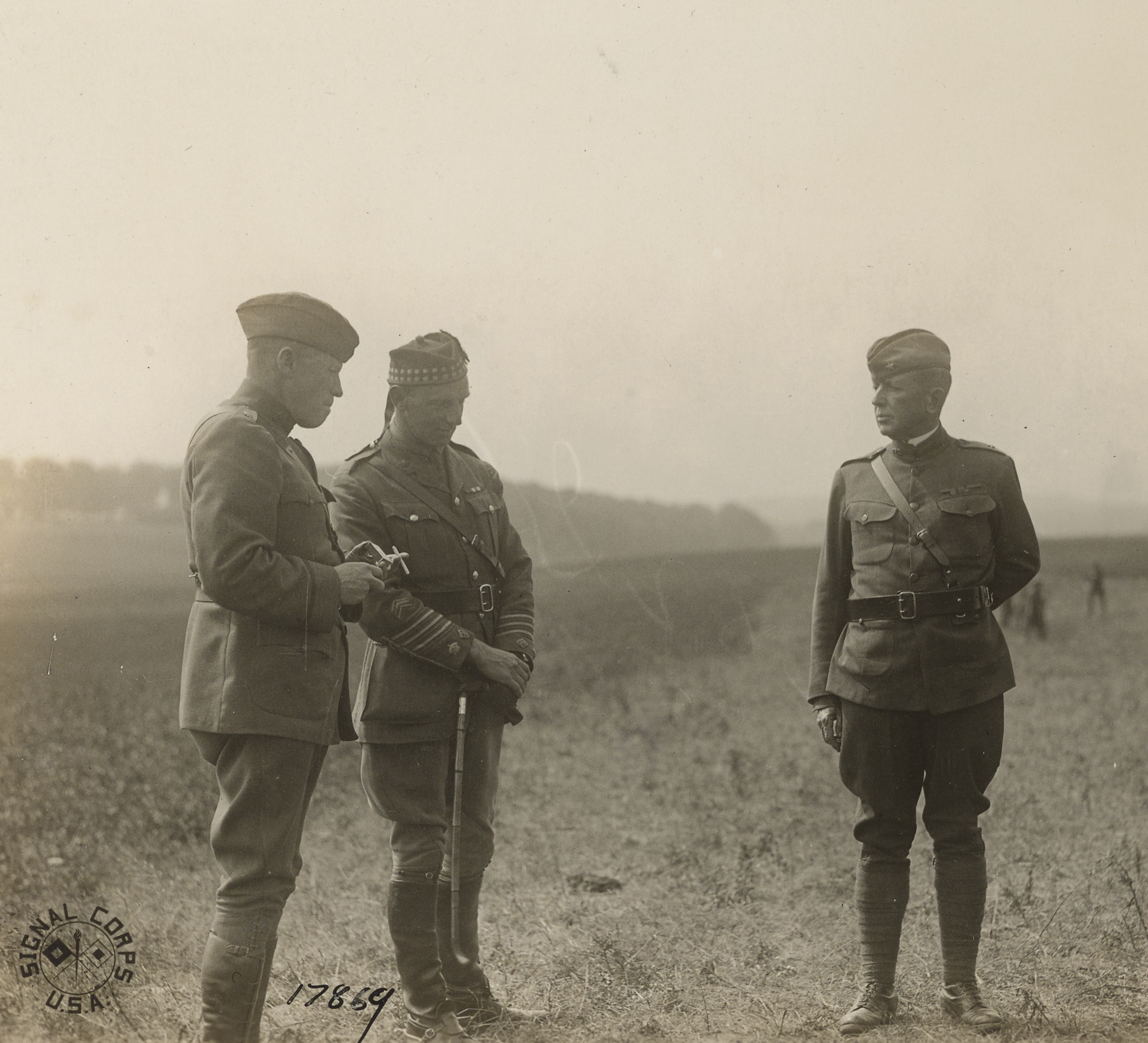
Officers at 78th Division, with Brigadier General Mark L. Hersey stood third from the left, France, July 1918.

Hersey was promoted to colonel in May 1917, shortly after the American entry into World War I, which occurred the month before. He was promoted to brigadier general in the National Army (i.e. a temporary promotion) in August and assigned as the commander of the 155th Infantry Brigade, part of the recently created 78th Division. The division was deployed to France in May and June 1918, where it became part of the American Expeditionary Forces (AEF). He commanded the 155th Infantry Brigade during the later stages of the Meuse–Argonne offensive and led it in a successful assault on German positions in the Bois des Loges near Tracy-le-Mont.

Hersey was promoted to major general (NA) in October and assumed command of the 4th Division in France on the last day of the same month—shortly before the Armistice which ended hostilities on November 11. He commanded the 4th Division during the Allied occupation of the Rhineland before it returned to the United States in the spring of 1919.

Hersey was awarded the Army Distinguished Service Medal for his leadership of both the 155th Brigade and the 4th Division during the war. The medal's citation reads:

The President of the United States of America, authorized by Act of Congress, July 9, 1918, takes pleasure in presenting the Army Distinguished Service Medal to Major General Mark Leslie Hersey, United States Army, for exceptionally meritorious and distinguished services to the Government of the United States, in a duty of great responsibility during World War I. As a Brigade Commander during the latter part of the Meuse-Argonne operation, General Hersey exhibited qualities of excellent leadership and sound judgment. His Brigade attacked and penetrated the strong enemy position of Bois-des Loges and wrested this strong point from the enemy. The success of his Brigade in this engagement was in a large measure due to his able leadership. Later he commanded with distinction the 4th Division during its operations in occupied territory.

== Post-war career ==
After returning from France, Hersey received honorary Doctor of Laws degrees (LL.D.) from Bates College and the University of Maine.

Hersey reverted to his permanent rank of colonel in August 1919, graduated from the Army War College in 1920 and was promoted to brigadier general in July of the same year. He was assigned as commander of the First Corps Area from December 1, 1922 – January 1, 1922. He was promoted to major general shortly before his retirement from the Army, at his own request, in November 1924.

== Death and burial ==
General Hersey died on January 22, 1934, and was buried in Arlington National Cemetery.

== Memberships ==
He was a member of the Pennsylvania Commandery of the Military Order of Foreign Wars. He was also a member of the Military Order of the World War and served as its national commander in 1926.

== Family ==
Hersey married Elizabeth Noyes on September 16, 1887. Together, they had three children: Mark Leslie, Dorothy, and Alice Elizabeth. She died on April 5, 1932, and is buried beside him at Arlington National Cemetery.

His son, Mark L. Hersey Jr. (1888–1974), was an officer in the United States Navy. He received the Navy Cross for distinguished service while commanding the destroyer USS Sampson (DD-63) during the First World War. He was the commanding officer of Naval Station Guantanamo Bay from May 1936 to June 1938. He rose to the rank of commodore during the Second World War. He and his wife are buried near his parents.

== Legacy ==
The USS General M. L. Hersey (AP-148), launched April 1944, was named in his honor.

== Awards ==
- Distinguished Service Medal
- Indian Campaign Medal
- Spanish Campaign Medal
- China Relief Expedition Medal
- Philippine Campaign Medal
- Mexican Service Medal
- Victory Medal with four campaign stars
- Army of Occupation of Germany Medal
- Commander, Legion of Honor (France)
- Croix de Guerre with palm (France)

== Dates of rank ==
- Second lieutenant – 12 June 1887
- First lieutenant – 16 December 1894
- Captain – 2 March 1899
- Major – 3 March 1911
- Lieutenant colonel – 1 July 1916
- Colonel – 15 May 1917
- Brigadier general, National Army – 5 August 1917 (accepted 28 August 1917)
- Major general, National Army – 1 October 1918 (accepted 14 October 1918)
- Discharged from National Army – 31 August 1919
- Brigadier general – 3 July 1920 (accepted 17 July 1920)
- Major general – 20 September 1924
- Retired – 2 November 1924
