= Michael Joseph Lenihan =

United States Army general (1865–1958)

Michael J. Lenihan
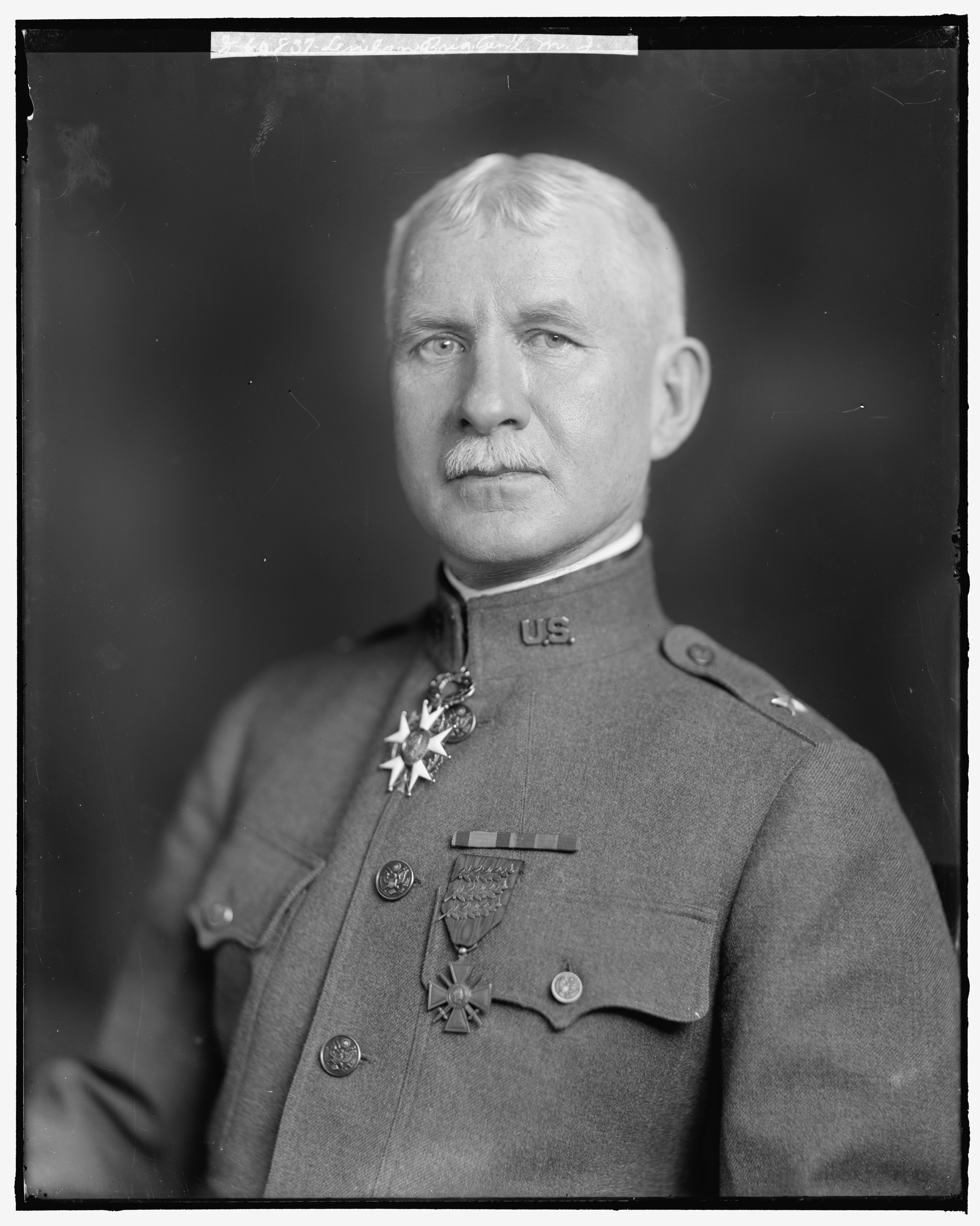
- Michael Lenihan commander of the 153rd Brigade in Raucourt, sometime in 1918.
- Born: February 5, 1865; Hopkinton, Massachusetts, United States
- Died: August 13, 1958 (aged 93); Philadelphia, Pennsylvania, United States
- Burial place: Mount Olivet Cemetery, Washington, D.C., United States
- Relatives: Douglass T. Greene (son-in-law); Lawrence V. Greene (grandson); Michael J. L. Greene (grandson); Paul J. Halloran (son-in-law)
- Military career
- Allegiance: United States
- Branch: United States Army
- Service years: 1887–1929
- Rank: Brigadier General
- Service number: 0-201
- Unit: Infantry Branch
- Commands: 83rd Brigade; 153rd Brigade; 3rd Division
- Conflicts: World War I
- Awards: Legion of Honor; Croix de Guerre

Michael Joseph Lenihan (May 2, 1865 – August 13, 1958) was a senior officer of the United States Army. He was involved in conflicts in the American Western Frontier, the Philippines, and World War I, where he commanded the 83rd Infantry Brigade, 42nd Division, during the Meuse–Argonne offensive while serving on the Western Front.

== Military career ==
Born the son of James Lenihan and Catherine Grainger, Michael Lenihan entered and later graduated 57th in a class of 64 from the United States Military Academy in June 1887. Among his classmates included several men who would later rise to the rank of brigadier general or higher in their military careers. They included: Charles B. Wheeler, Edward C. Young, Richmond P. Davis, Edgar Russel, George O. Squier, Ernest Hinds, George W. Gatchell, Charles H. Martin, P. D. Lochridge, Nathaniel F. McClure, William C. Rivers, William Weigel, Thomas G. Hanson, Herman Hall, Marcus D. Cronin, Alexander L. Dade, Charles S. Farnsworth, Charles Gerhardt, James T. Dean, Ulysses G. McAlexander, Edmund Wittenmyer, Frederic D. Evans, Mark L. Hersey and Frank H. Albright.

He was appointed first lieutenant in 1894. He was made captain in 1899 and major in 1911. While stationed on the Hawaiian Islands, he was promoted to Lieutenant‑Colonel.

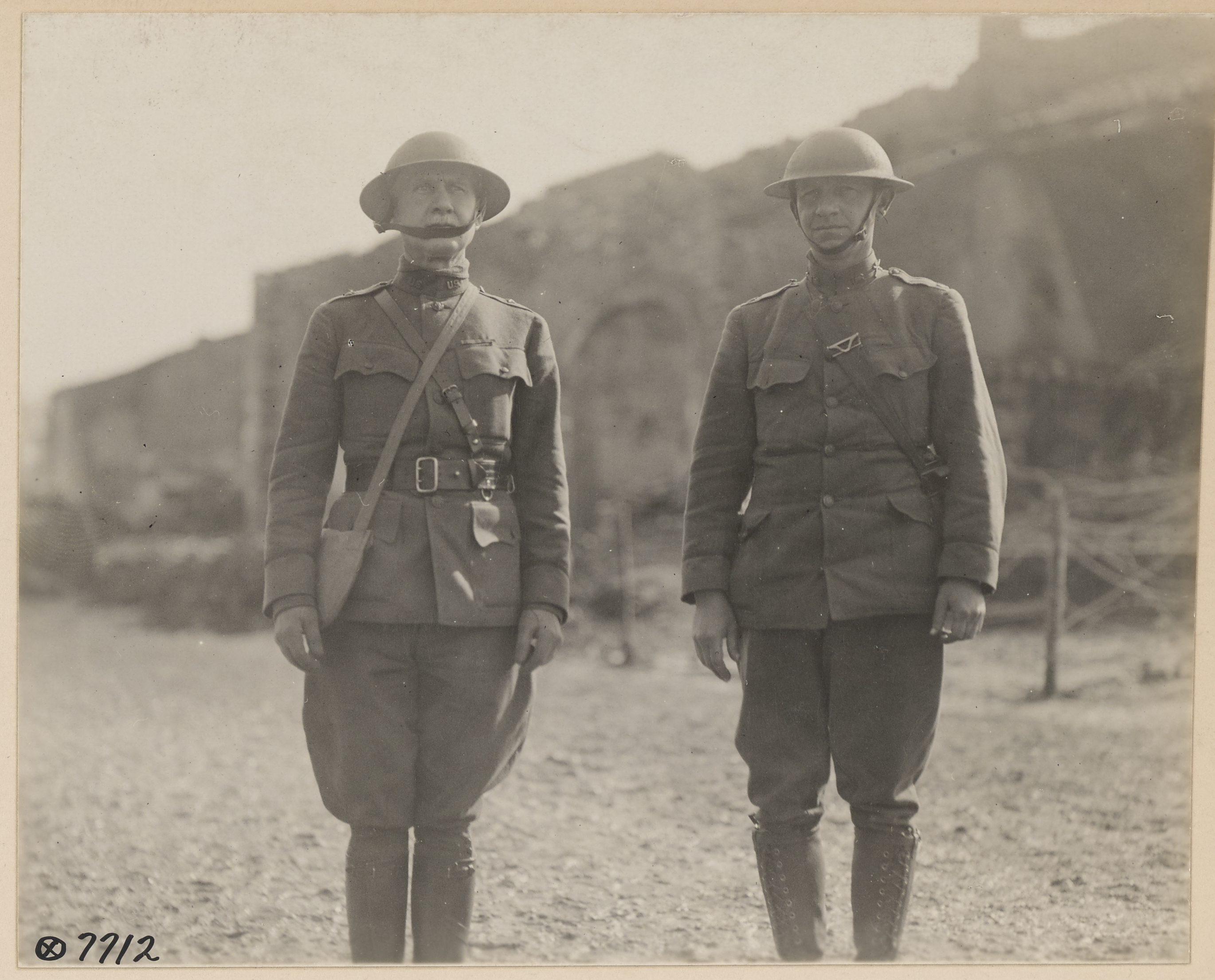
Brigadier General Michael J. Lenihan and Major Henderson, commanding the 2nd Battalion, 166th Regiment, before making a tour of inspection, France, March 7, 1918.

After the American entry into World War I, in April 1917, Lenihan received a temporary promotion to brigadier general (August 1917) and assumed command of the 83rd Infantry Brigade, which, together with the 84th Infantry Brigade and various other supporting units, formed part of the 42nd "Rainbow" Division. The division was a recently activated National Guard formation and was commanded at the time by Major General William Abram Mann. The division began to depart for service overseas on the Western Front in October, arriving in France in early November. Lenihan was to command his brigade throughout 1918 in most of the battles it found itself engaged in, such as the Second Battle of the Marne in July and the Battle of Saint-Mihiel in September.

During the Meuse–Argonne offensive, when Lenihan's 83rd Brigade and Brigadier General Douglas MacArthur’s neighboring 84th Brigade failed to make progress against heavy German defences, Major General Charles P. Summerall, commanding V Corps (under whose command the 42nd Division was serving), threatened to relieve both generals. Major General William M. Wright, commanding the nearby 89th Division, describes in his diary that MacArthur's troops could approach Hill 288 and Châtillon-sous-les-Côtes using the forest as cover and took the objective, while Lenihan's brigade was stopped by enemy resistance before they could take the objectives in the Landres-et-Saint-Georges area, sustaining heavy casualties. Summerall ordered Major General Charles T. Menoher, the 42nd's commander since the previous December, to relieve Lenihan, which he did on 17 October 1918, being replaced by a much younger man, Colonel Henry J. Reilly. Lenihan protested and insisted on a hearing. The appointed inspector found no wrongdoing of Lenihan and Lieutenant General Hunter Liggett, commanding the U.S. First Army and Summerall's superior, overrode the corps commander's decision and made Lenihan commander of the 153rd Brigade of the 77th Division. Lenihan would remain in command of the brigade for the rest of the war and until it was deactivated in May 1919.

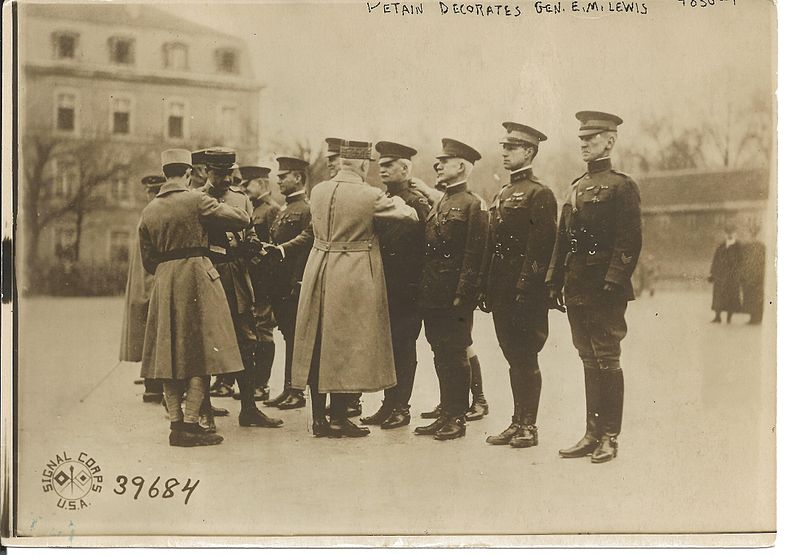
Michael Lenihan (3rd from the right) between generals Lewis and Mitchell at the award ceremony for the Commander, Legion of Honor in January 1919.

Lenihan returned to the rank of colonel after World War 1 in 1919. He was an instructor at the Naval War College, before he became Chief of Staff of the XII Army Corps in 1924. Lenihan was again promoted to brigadier general in 1925. He was awarded an LL.D. title by the College of the Holy Cross in 1925. In the last year of his active army service, he commanded the 3rd Infantry Division from March 1928 to March 1929.

Michael Lenihan died on August 13, 1958, at the age of 93 in Philadelphia. He was interred at Mount Olivet Cemetery in Washington, D.C.

Military offices
Preceded by Joseph D. Leitch	Commanding General 3rd Division; 1928−1929	Succeeded by Joseph C. Castner
