= Edmund Wittenmyer =

United States Army general

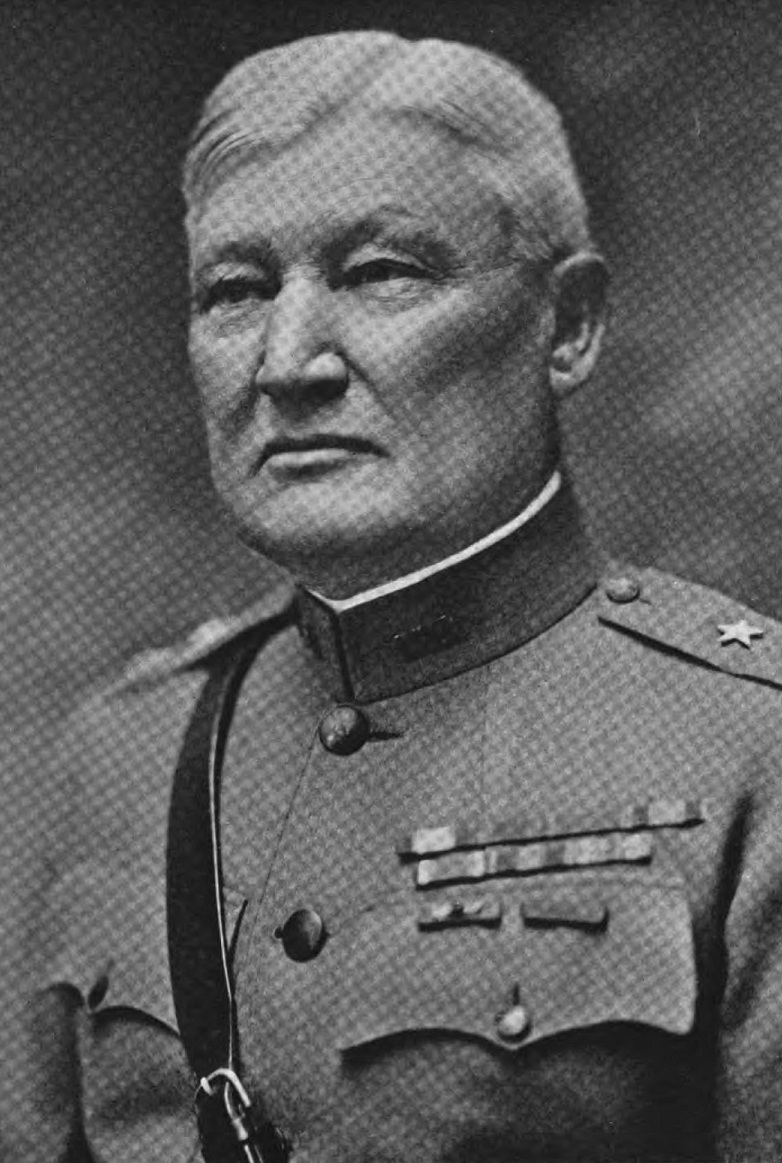
- From 1927's History of the Seventh Division, United States Army, 1917-1919
- Born: April 25, 1862; Buford, Ohio, US
- Died: July 5, 1937 (aged 75); Washington, D.C., US
- Burial place: Arlington National Cemetery
- Military career
- Allegiance: United States
- Branch: United States Army
- Service years: 1887–1923
- Rank: Major General
- Service number: 0-200
- Unit: U.S. Army Infantry Branch
- Commands: Company D, 15th Infantry; 153rd Infantry Brigade, 77th Division; 7th Division; Fort D. A. Russell
- Conflicts: Spanish–American War; China Relief Expedition; Philippine–American War; Second Occupation of Cuba; Mexican Border War; World War I
- Awards: Army Distinguished Service Medal; Legion of Honor (Commander) (France); Croix de Guerre with Palm (France)
- Other work: Teacher; Farmer

Edmund Wittenmyer (April 25, 1862 − July 5, 1937) was a career officer in the United States Army. A veteran of the Spanish–American War and World War I, in addition to several other conflicts, he attained the rank of major general and was most notable for his service as commander of 153rd Infantry Brigade, 77th Division and the 7th Division during World War I.

== Early life ==
Edmund Wittenmyer was born in Buford, Ohio on April 25, 1862, a son of Daniel G. Wittenmyer and Rebecca Ann (Murphy) Wittenmyer. He was educated in the schools of Highland County, Ohio and at age 15 he began teaching school in West Union, Ohio. In 1883 he was accepted to the United States Military Academy. He graduated in 1887, ranked 55th in a class of 64. Among his classmates included several men who would later rise to the rank of brigadier general or higher in their military careers. They included: Charles B. Wheeler, Edward C. Young, Richmond P. Davis, Edgar Russel, George O. Squier, Ernest Hinds, George W. Gatchell, Charles H. Martin, P. D. Lochridge, Nathaniel F. McClure, William C. Rivers, William Weigel, Thomas G. Hanson, Herman Hall, Marcus D. Cronin, Alexander L. Dade, Charles S. Farnsworth, Charles Gerhardt, James T. Dean, Ulysses G. McAlexander, Frederic D. Evans, Michael J. Lenihan, Mark L. Hersey and Frank H. Albright.

== Start of career ==
Witenmyer was commissioned a second lieutenant of Infantry and assigned to the 9th Infantry Regiment. He was posted to San Diego Barracks, California, where he remained until 1891. In 1892, he was posted to Fort Wingate, New Mexico. In 1893, he was on duty at the World's Columbian Exposition in Chicago.

Wittenmyer was a student at the Infantry and Cavalry School from 1893 to 1895, and was promoted to first lieutenant in 1894. He then served with the 15th Infantry at Fort Sheridan, Illinois and Fort Bayard, New Mexico. While at Fort Bayard he served first as regimental quartermaster, and then as regimental adjutant.

During the Spanish–American War, he was first posted to Fort Huachuca, Arizona, where his regiment conducted security patrols on the Mexico–United States border. In November 1898, he was in Huntsville, Alabama with his regiment awaiting transport to Cuba. In January 1899, he was assigned to duty in Puerto Principe. In March, 1899 he was promoted to captain.

In July 1899, Wittenmyer returned to the United States with the 15th Infantry. Again assigned as regimental adjutant, Wittenmyer was with the 15th Infantry in the autumn of 1899, when it participated in the China Relief Expedition. When the Army organized forces in China into brigades, Wittenmyer was appointed adjutant of the Second Brigade. He was then appointed to command of Company D, 15th Infantry, which was assigned to Legaspi, Cagdianao during the Philippine–American War. He participated in several expeditions against Filipino insurgents until February 1902, when he was assigned to temporary paymaster duty in Manila. He returned to the United States in April 1903 and performed paymaster duties in the Washington, D.C. office of the Paymaster General.

== Continued career ==
In March 1906, Wittenmyer was assigned to the 5th Infantry at Plattsburgh Barracks, New York. In October 1906, his regiment deployed as part of the Army of Cuban Pacification during the Second Occupation of Cuba, and he served there until 1908. Upon returning to the United States, Wittenmyer was assigned as the 5th Infantry's adjutant, a post he held until January 1910.

Wittenmyer served on the Army General Staff from January 1910 to March 1911. In February 1911, he was promoted to major. In April 1911, he was a member of an Army board that considered locations for Army and National Guard training sites. After serving on the War College staff, Wittenmyer was assigned to the 27th Infantry at Fort Sheridan, Illinois. In February 1913, he was with the 27th Infantry when it was posted to Texas City, Texas for border security during the Mexican Revolution.

In July 1913, Wittenmyer was assigned as U.S. military attaché in Havana, Cuba and military advisor to the president of Cuba. He remained in this post until the summer of 1917, and was promoted to lieutenant colonel in July 1916 and colonel in May 1917, a month after the American entry into World War I.

== World War I ==
In August 1917, Wittenmyer was promoted to temporary brigadier general for World War I and assigned to command of the 153rd Infantry Brigade, a unit of the 77th Division. The brigade served in France beginning in April 1918, including completing its training in the Calais Sector before relieving the 42nd Division on the front lines of the Baccarat Sector in June 1918.

On August 3, 1918, Wittenmyer's brigade transferred to the Vesle Sector with the 77th Division, where it remained until August 13, when it took part in offensive operations to cross the Vesle River and advance to the Aisne River. The 77th Division then marched to the Argonne Sector, where it occupied defensive positions until September 25, when it took part in the Meuse–Argonne offensive.

Wittenmyer was promoted to major general with an effective date of October 1, 1918. The 153rd Brigade remained on the offensive until October 15, including the capture of Saint-Juvin from the Germans. On October 24, Wittenmyer assumed command of the 7th Division, which took part in the final offensive of the war as part of Second United States Army. After the armistice ended the war, Wittenmyer remained in command of the 7th Division as it occupied positions near Toul, France.

For his World War I service, Wittenmyer received the Army Distinguished Service Medal. In addition, he was awarded France's Legion of Honor (Commander) and Croix de Guerre with Palm.

=== Army Distinguished Service Medal citation ===
The President of the United States of America, authorized by Act of Congress, July 9, 1918, takes pleasure in presenting the Army Distinguished Service Medal to Major General Edmund Wittenmyer, United States Army, for exceptionally meritorious and distinguished services to the Government of the United States, in a duty of great responsibility during World War I. General Wittenmyer served with marked distinction as Brigade Commander in the Meuse-Argonne offensive, and as Division Commander in the final operations in the Toul sector, and in both capacities, by his untiring efforts and breadth of vision, proved himself to be an able leader. Service: Army Rank: Major General GENERAL ORDERS: War Department, General Orders No. 12 (1919)

== Post-World War I ==
Wittenmyer took part in the post-war occupation of Germany. He remained in command of the 7th Division, except for brief periods of leave, until it returned to the United States. The 7th Division was demobilized on June 20, 1919.

After the war, Wittenmyer was reduced to his permanent rank of colonel and assigned as chief of staff for the Ninth Corps Area. In 1922, he was promoted to the permanent rank of brigadier general and assigned as commander of Fort D. A. Russell, Wyoming. He remained in command until he retired in August 1923.

== Retirement and death ==
Wittenmyer never married, and had no children. In retirement, he lived with a sister in law and her family near Peebles, Ohio and operated a farm in nearby Lawshe, Meigs Township. In 1930, Congress enacted legislation allowing World War I general officers to retire at the highest rank they had held, and Wittenmyer was promoted to major general on the retired list.

In 1936, Wittenmyer became ill after an automobile accident, and sought treatment at the military hospital in Hot Springs, Arkansas. He was diagnosed with cancer, and his left arm was amputated in an effort to halt the cancer's spread. Despite this, Wittenmyer's health did not improve, and he died at Walter Reed Hospital on July 5, 1937, at the age of seventy-five. He was buried at Arlington National Cemetery.

== Photos ==
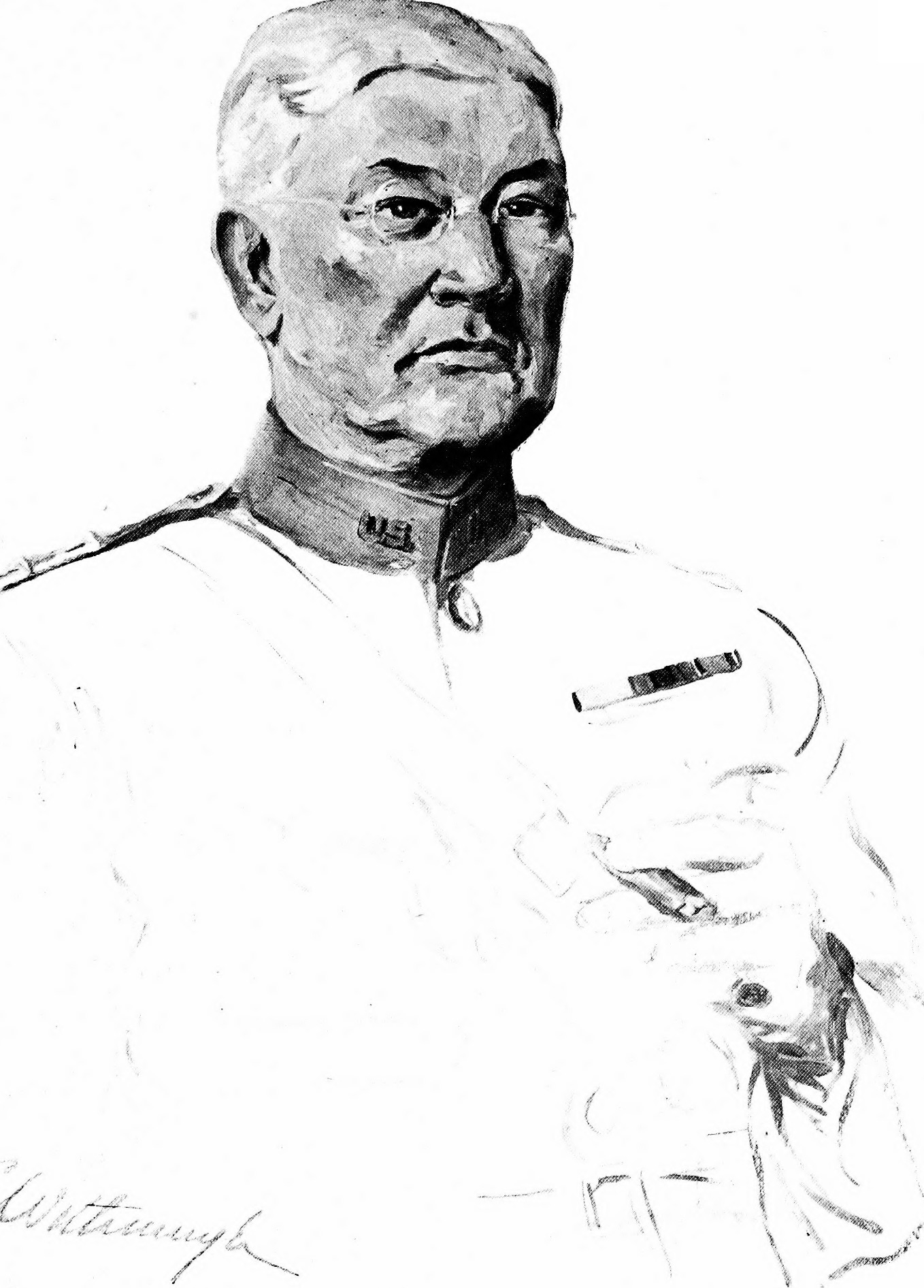
From 1920's Soldiers All; Portraits and Sketches of the Men of the A. E. F.

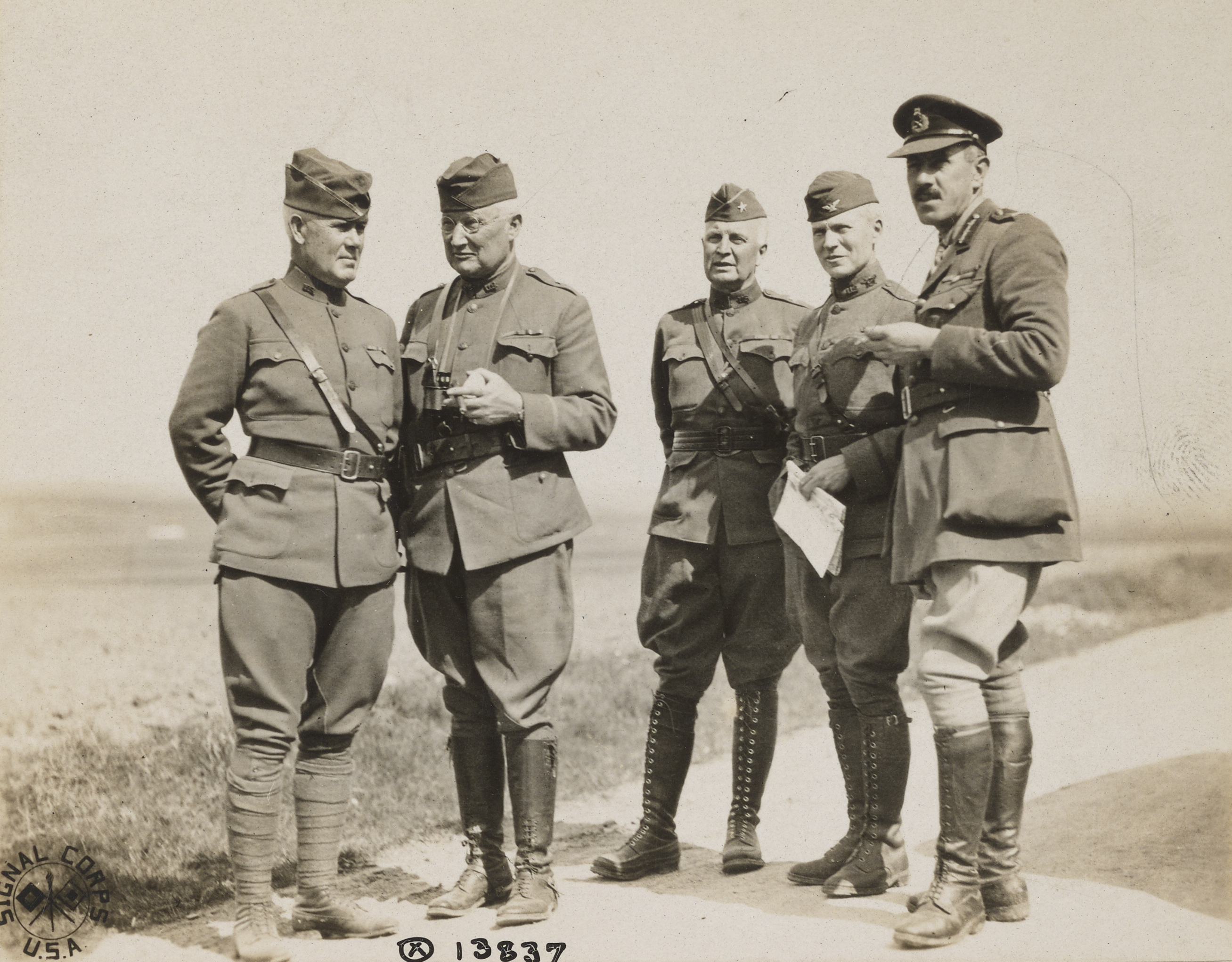
National Archives photo of 77th Division commander and brigade commanders, 1918

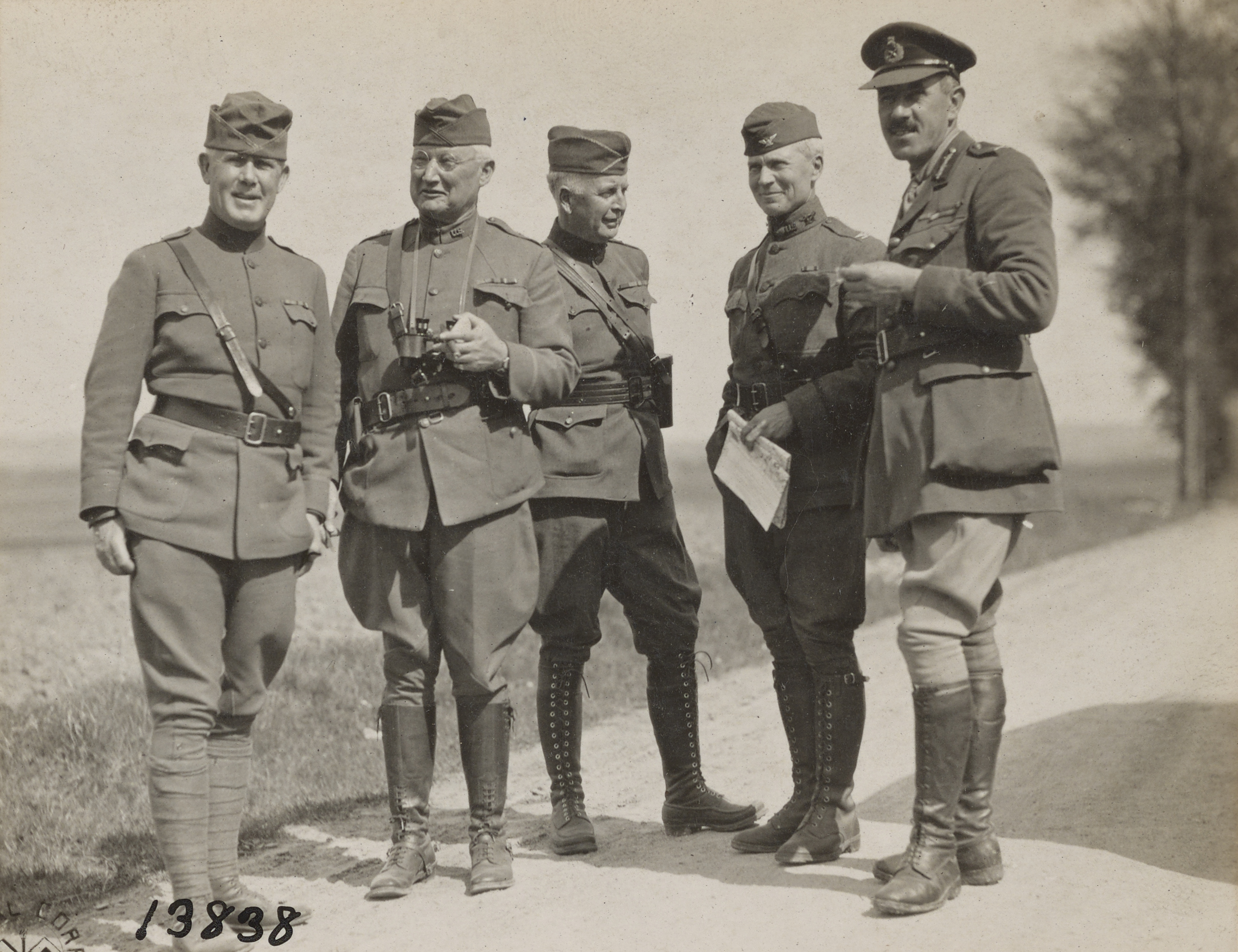
77th Division commander and brigade commanders conversing in France, 1918. National Archives and Records Administration.

== Sources ==
=== Books ===
- Association of Graduates of the United States Military Academy (June 11, 1937). Sixty-Eighth Annual Report. Newburgh, NY: The Moore Printing Company – via United States Military Academy Library.
- Center of Military History, United States Army (1988). Order of Battle of the United States Land Forces in the World War. Vol. 2. Washington, DC: US Government Printing Office – via Google Books.
- Cullum, George W.; Holden, Edward S. (1901). Biographical Register of the Officers and Graduates of the U.S. Military Academy. Vol. Supplement, Volume IV. Cambridge, MA: Riverside Press – via Google Books.
- Cullum, George W.; Robinson, Wirt (1920). Biographical Register of the Officers and Graduates of the United States Military Academy at West Point. Vol. Supplement, Volume VI-A. Saginaw, MI: Seemann & Peters – via Google Books.
- Davis, Henry Blaine Jr. (1998). Generals in Khaki. Raleigh, NC: Pentland Press. ISBN 978-1-5719-7088-6 – via Google Books.
- Roush, Lester Le Roy, ed. (1942). History of the Roush Family in America. Vol. II. Parkersburg, WV: Banner Printing Co. – via HathiTrust.

=== Internet ===
- "Army Distinguished Service Medal Citation, Edmund Wittenmyer". Hall of Valor. Tysons, VA: Sightline Media Group.
