= Nathaniel Fish McClure =

United States Army general

Nathaniel McClure
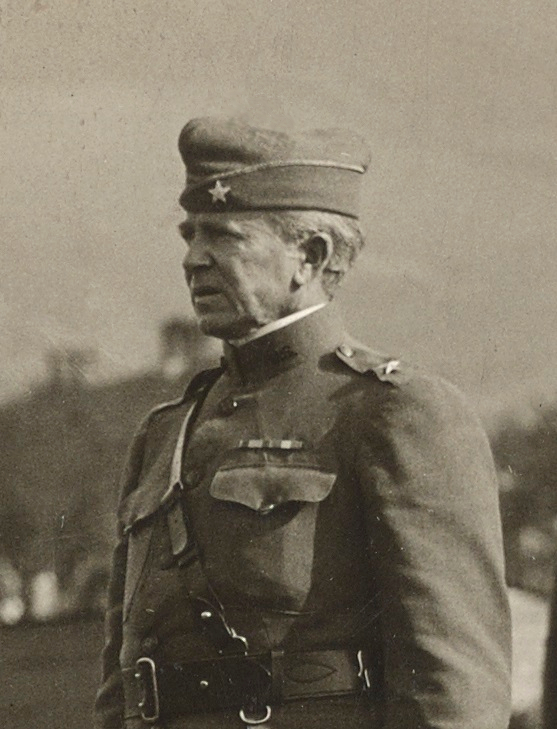
- Brig. Gen. Nathaniel McClure in July 1918
- Born: July 21, 1865; Crittenden, Kentucky, United States
- Died: June 26, 1942 (aged 76); Washington, D.C., United States
- Spouse: Mamie Chapin
- Military career
- Allegiance: United States
- Branch: United States Army
- Service years: 1887–1929
- Rank: Brigadier general
- Service number: 0-167
- Conflicts: Spanish–American War; Philippine–American War; Pancho Villa Expedition; World War I

Nathaniel Fish McClure (July 21, 1865 – June 26, 1942) was a United States Army officer in the early 20th century who became a brigadier general. He served in several conflicts, including World War I.

== Early life and education ==
Nathaniel Fish McClure was born July 21, 1865, in Crittenden, Kentucky, to Ezra R. McClure and Nannie McClure. He attended the United States Military Academy and graduated in 1887 as number twenty-three of sixty-four in his class. Among his classmates included several men who would later rise to the rank of brigadier general or higher in their military careers. They included: Charles B. Wheeler, Edward C. Young, Richmond P. Davis, Edgar Russel, George O. Squier, Ernest Hinds, George W. Gatchell, Charles H. Martin, P. D. Lochridge, William C. Rivers, William Weigel, Thomas G. Hanson, Herman Hall, Marcus D. Cronin, Alexander L. Dade, Charles S. Farnsworth, Charles Gerhardt, James T. Dean, Ulysses G. McAlexander, Edmund Wittenmyer, Frederic D. Evans, Michael J. Lenihan, Mark L. Hersey and Frank H. Albright.

== Military career ==
In 1887, McClure was commissioned for cavalry and performed frontier duty until 1901. As part of this frontier duty, McClure, then a lieutenant in the Fifth Cavalry, was on duty with Troop C, Fourth Cavalry, when he prepared a map of Yosemite National Park. Though a remote posting, McClure expressed his appreciation for the locale thus:

"It is the cavalryman's paradise. Food and drink for his horse everywhere. Though the cold of spring and autumn may be biting, though the life may be lonely, though the work may be difficult – still, happy is the soldier whose lines fall amid these scenes of grandeur and sublimity, where nature has put forth her mightiest efforts"

After the frontier, McClure was in Puerto Rico from 1899 to 1900, then he served in the Philippines from 1901 to 1903. McClure became a distinguished graduate of the School of the Line in 1909, and he graduated from the Army Staff College in 1910. He became an instructor at the Army Service School from 1913 to 1916. During the spring of 1916, he participated in the Pancho Villa Expedition. In 1917, McClure graduated from the United States Army War College and was promoted to brigadier general on December 17 of that year. He was the commander of Base Camp Number One in San Nazaire, France, until 1918. McClure then became commander of the 69th Infantry Brigade for two months, and then commanded the 38th Infantry Division for five weeks. McClure spent three months in combat with both the 69th and the 38th Divisions. McClure worked on duty in the Chief of Staff's office in Washington from late 1918 to early 1919. From 1920 to 1922, he served as the assistant commandant of the Disciplinary Barracks at Fort Leavenworth, Kansas and from 1923 to 1926 he worked with the Signal Corps. McClure retired as a colonel July 21, 1929, and his bigadier general rank was restored June 1930.

== Personal life ==
During his lifetime, McClure belonged to a number of groups and organizations including:

- Military Order of the Carabao
- Association of Graduates
- U.S. Cavalry Association
- American Legion
- Veterans of Foreign Wars
- Military Order of Foreign Wars

On July 14, 1890, McClure married Mamie Chapin. McClure retired in Wardman Park in Washington, D.C. In 1939, McClure had his book published, "Class of 1887, United States Military Academy". He was a known Democrat and at the age of seventy-six, McClure died in Wardman Park on June 26, 1942.
