= Thomas Grafton Hanson =

United States Army general

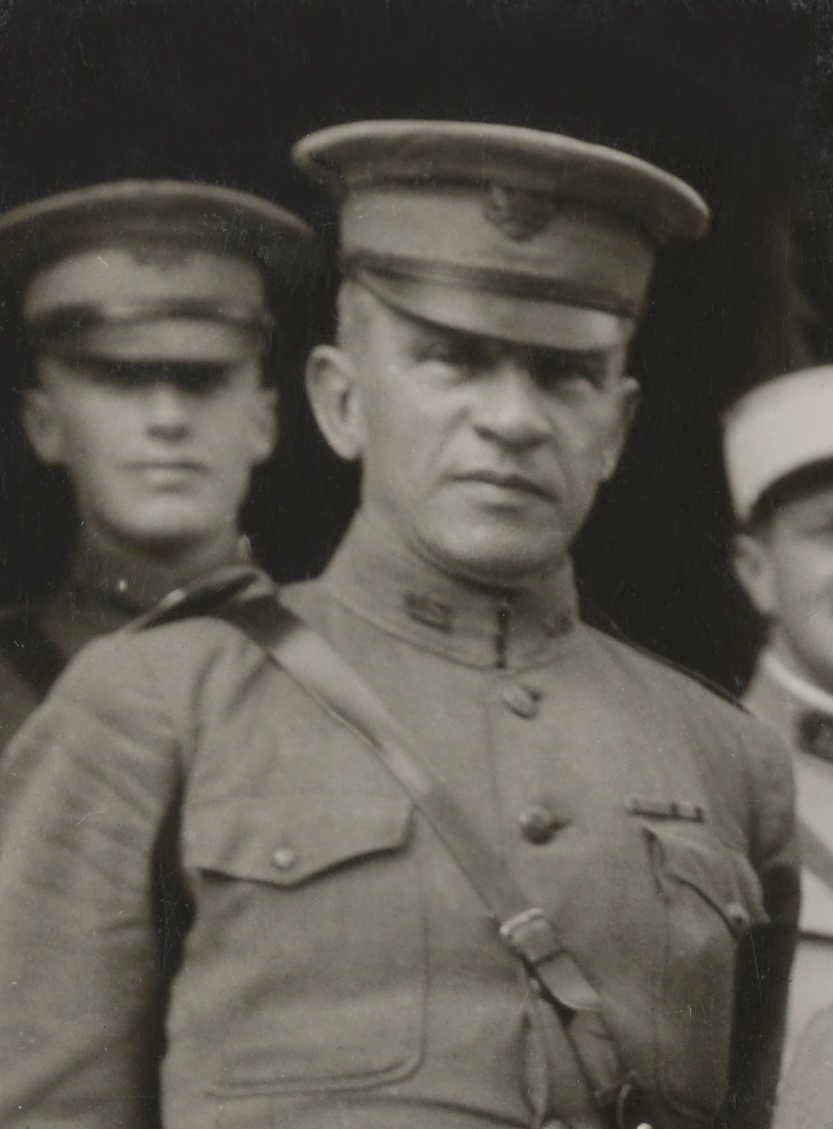
- Brigadier General Thomas Grafton Hanson in France, August 1918
- Born: May 1, 1865; San Rafael, California, United States
- Died: May 23, 1945 (aged 80); Oakland, California, United States
- Spouse: Pauline DeForest
- Children: 2
- Military career
- Allegiance: United States
- Branch: United States Army
- Service years: 1887–1919
- Rank: Brigadier General
- Service number: 0-13357
- Unit: Infantry Branch
- Commands: 178th Brigade
- Conflicts: Spanish–American War; Philippine–American War; World War I • Battle of Saint-Mihiel • Meuse-Argonne Offensive

Brigadier General Thomas Grafton Hanson (May 1, 1865 – May 23, 1945) was a United States Army officer in the late 19th and early 20th centuries. He served in several conflicts, including World War I, during which he commanded the 89th Infantry Division.

== Military career ==
Hanson was born on May 1, 1865, in San Rafael, California. He graduated thirty-fourth in a class of sixty-four from the United States Military Academy (USMA) at West Point, New York, in June 1887. Among his classmates included several men who would later rise to the rank of brigadier general or higher in their military careers. They included: Charles B. Wheeler, Edward C. Young, Richmond P. Davis, Edgar Russel, George O. Squier, Ernest Hinds, George W. Gatchell, Charles H. Martin, P. D. Lochridge, Nathaniel F. McClure, William C. Rivers, William Weigel, Herman Hall, Marcus D. Cronin, Alexander L. Dade, Charles S. Farnsworth, Charles Gerhardt, James T. Dean, Ulysses G. McAlexander, Edmund Wittenmyer, Frederic D. Evans, Michael J. Lenihan, Mark L. Hersey and Frank H. Albright.

Hanson was commissioned into the 19th Infantry Regiment, and he did frontier duty from 1887 to 1890. He graduated from the Infantry and Cavalry School in 1891. During the Spanish–American War, Hanson served in Cuba and Puerto Rico, and he went to the Philippines shortly thereafter. Hanson taught at the USMA from 1901 to 1905 as an assistant professor of modern languages. He then graduated from the Army School of the Line and the Army Staff College between 1910 and 1912.

Hanson was promoted to the rank of brigadier general on August 5, 1917, after the American entry into World War I. He assumed command of the 178th Infantry Brigade, part of the 89th Infantry Division, first at Camp Funston and later in France, where he led it in numerous battles, including the Battle of Saint-Mihiel and the Meuse-Argonne Offensive. Hanson briefly commanded the entire 89th Division from December 24 to 27, 1917.

Hanson retired on January 4, 1919, at his permanent rank of colonel. He lived in San Francisco and died in Oakland, California, on May 23, 1945, shortly after the end of World War II in Europe.

== Personal life ==
Hanson married Pauline DeForest on September 1, 1893. Together, they had two children. Hanson's great great uncle was John Hanson, the 9th president of the Continental Congress who served until 1782.

== Bibliography ==
- Davis, Henry Blaine Jr. (1998). Generals in Khaki. Raleigh, North Carolina: Pentland Press. ISBN 1571970886. OCLC 40298151.
- Marquis Who's Who (1975). Who Was Who In American History – The Military. Chicago, Illinois: Marquis Who's Who. ISBN 0837932017.
