= Charles Brewster Wheeler =

U.S. Army brigadier general

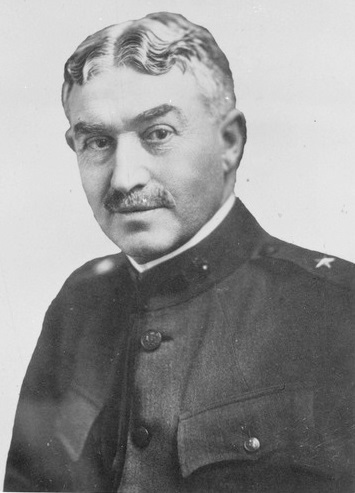
- National Archives photo of Wheeler as a brigadier general, c. 1917
- Born: May 3, 1865; Matteson, Illinois, US
- Died: April 11, 1946 (aged 80); Wayland, Massachusetts, US
- Burial place: Pittsfield Cemetery, Pittsfield, Massachusetts, US
- Education: United States Military Academy
- Spouse(s): Zella Lentilhon (m. 1893–1916) Ruth (Whitmore) Parker (m. 1921–1928)
- Children: 2
- Military career
- Service: United States Army
- Service years: 1887–1919
- Rank: Brigadier General
- Nickname: "Sam"
- Service number: O13386
- Unit: United States Army Ordnance Corps
- Commands: U.S. Military Commission for Czechoslovakia; Chief Ordnance Officer, U.S. Forces in Great Britain; Base Section Number 3, Services of Supply; Chief Ordnance Officer, American Expeditionary Forces; Chief of Ordnance of the United States Army; Supply Division, United States Army Ordnance Corps; Chief Ordnance Officer, Philippine Division; Manila Ordnance Depot
- Wars: Spanish–American War; Philippine–American War; World War I
- Awards: Army Distinguished Service Medal; Legion of Honour (Commander) (France); Order of the Bath (Companion) (Great Britain) (Honorary)
- Other work: Vice President, Eaton, Crane and Pike Company

Charles Brewster Wheeler (May 3, 1865 – April 11, 1946) was a United States Army officer who served in the Spanish–American War, Philippine–American War, and World War I, and rose to the rank of brigadier general. Wheeler's awards and decorations included the Army Distinguished Service Medal, French Legion of Honour (Commander), and honorary Order of the Bath (Companion) from the United Kingdom.

A native of Matteson, Illinois, Wheeler was raised and educated in Matteson and Hyde Park, Illinois, and briefly resided in Fergus Falls, Minnesota. He was appointed to the United States Military Academy (West Point) in 1883, graduated in 1887, and received his commission as a second lieutenant of Field Artillery. He soon transferred to Ordnance, specializing in the design and production of artillery weapons and equipment. During the Spanish–American War and Philippine–American War he was responsible for the procurement and fielding of Field Artillery and Coast Artillery material used in Cuba, the Philippines, and other areas of combat. After these two conflicts, he served in the Philippines and spent several years as commander of the Watertown Arsenal in Massachusetts.

During World War I, Wheeler was promoted to brigadier general, and he served successively as: head of the Supply Division, United States Army Ordnance Corps; Chief of Ordnance of the United States Army; Chief Ordnance Officer, American Expeditionary Forces; commander, Base Section Number 3, Services of Supply; Chief Ordnance Officer, U.S. Forces in Great Britain; and chairman of the U.S. Military Commission for Czechoslovakia.

Wheeler retired in 1919 and settled in Pittsfield, Massachusetts, where he served as vice president for manufacturing at the Eaton, Crane and Pike Company, a paper manufacturer. He retired in 1933, and in 1943 he moved to Wayland, Massachusetts to live with his daughter and son-in-law. He died in Wayland on April 11, 1946, and was buried at Pittsfield Cemetery in Pittsfield.

== Early life ==
Charles B. Wheeler was born in Matteson, Illinois on May 3, 1865, the son of Christopher O. Wheeler and Mary J. Safford Wheeler. He graduated from high school in Hyde Park, Illinois, then moved to Fergus Falls, Minnesota. In 1883, he was appointed to the United States Military Academy (West Point) by U.S. representative Knute Nelson. At West Point, Wheeler was nicknamed "Sam" after a classmate misheard his last name as "Weller", and associated it with Sam Weller, a character in The Pickwick Papers by Charles Dickens.

Wheeler graduated from West Point in 1887 ranked fourth of 64 and received his commission as a second lieutenant of Field Artillery. Among his classmates included several men who would later rise to the rank of brigadier general or higher in their military careers. They included: Edward C. Young, Richmond P. Davis, Edgar Russel, George O. Squier, Ernest Hinds, George W. Gatchell, Charles H. Martin, P. D. Lochridge, Nathaniel F. McClure, William C. Rivers, William Weigel, Thomas G. Hanson, Herman Hall, Marcus D. Cronin, Alexander L. Dade, Charles S. Farnsworth, Charles Gerhardt, James T. Dean, Ulysses G. McAlexander, Edmund Wittenmyer, Frederic D. Evans, Michael J. Lenihan, Mark L. Hersey and Frank H. Albright.

== Start of career ==
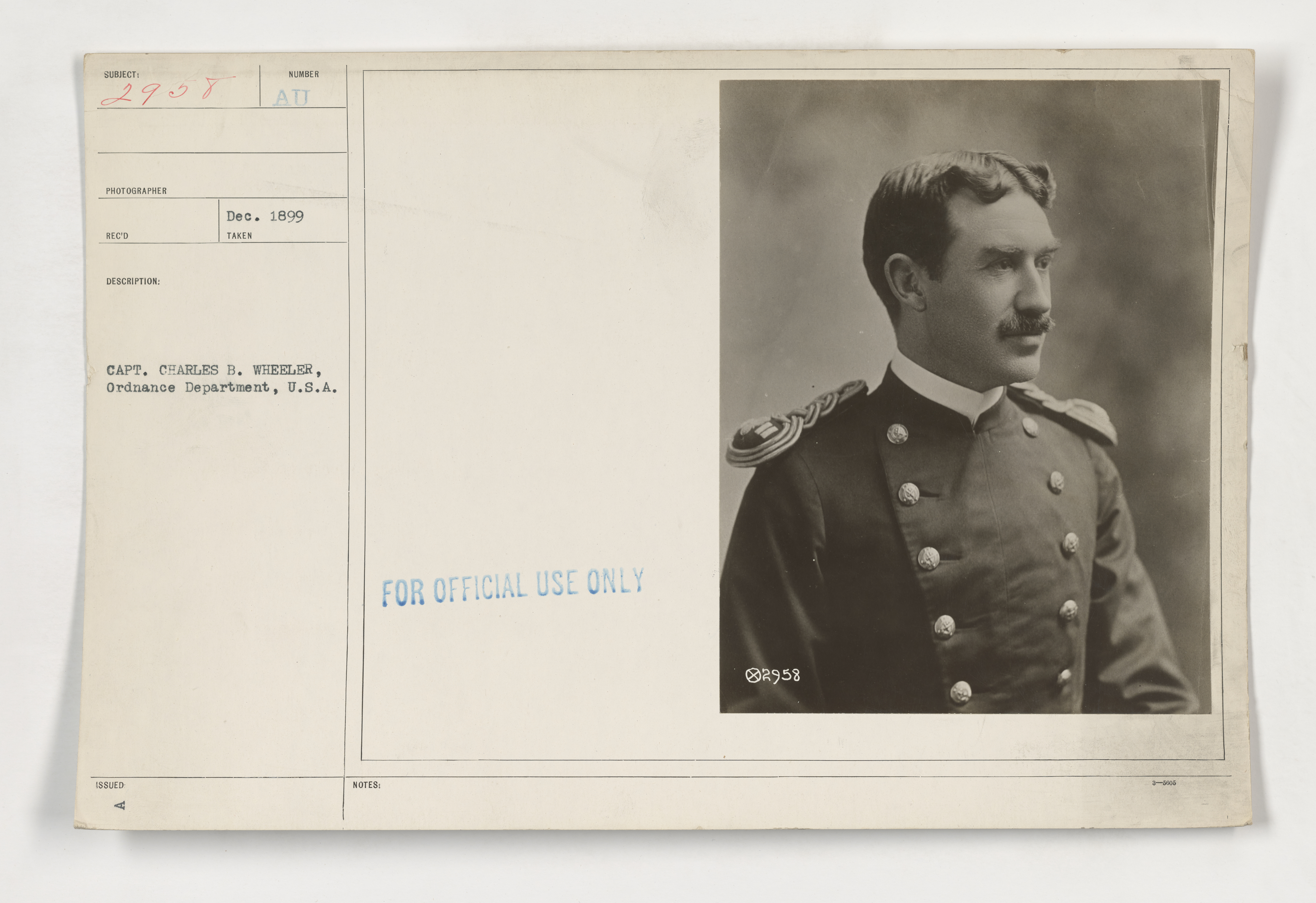
Wheeler as a captain in 1899

Wheeler's initial assignment was with Battery M, 5th Artillery Regiment at Fort Schuyler, New York. In September 1890, he began the officer's course at the Fort Monroe, Virginia Artillery School. After graduation in December 1890, he was promoted to first lieutenant and transferred to the Ordnance Department. Assigned to experimentation with and development of Field Artillery and Coast Artillery equipment at Sandy Hook Proving Ground, New Jersey. During 1893, he performed several months of temporary duty at the World's Columbian Exposition in Chicago.

In December 1895, Wheeler was assigned to the Watertown Arsenal in Massachusetts, and in 1896, he was posted to the Office of the Chief of Ordnance in Washington, D.C. During his service with the Chief of Ordnance, Wheeler was in charge of design, manufacture and maintenance of material used in Coast Artillery fortifications during the Spanish–American War and Philippine–American War, and he was promoted to captain on July 7, 1898. On June 25, 1906, Wheeler was promoted to major, and from November 1906 to December 1907 he served as chief ordnance officer of the Philippine Division and commander of the Manila Ordnance Depot.

== Continued career ==
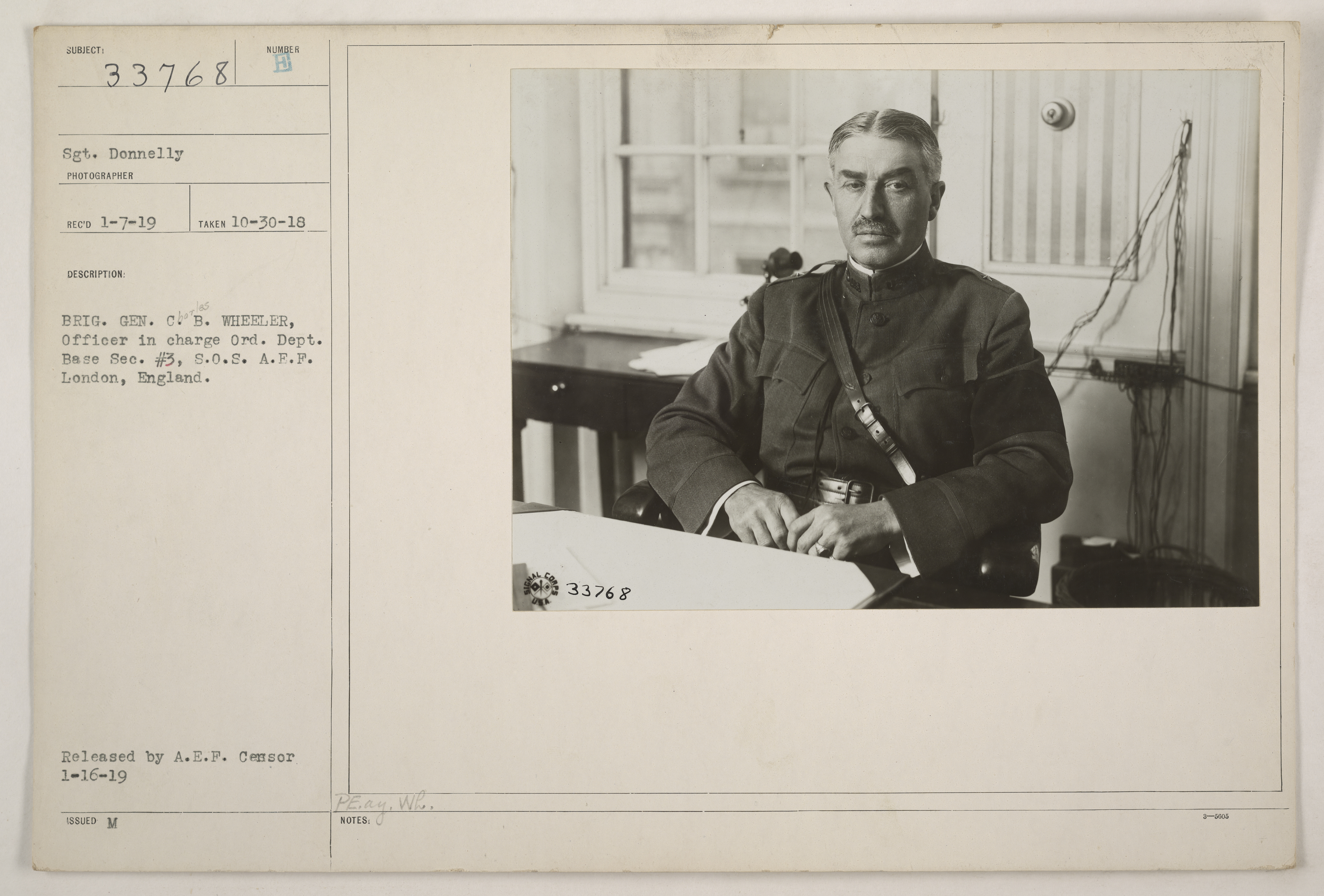
Wheeler as a brigadier general in 1919

From January 1908 to March 1917, Wheeler commanded the Watertown Arsenal, and he was promoted to lieutenant colonel on June 13, 1909. On November 3, 1914, he was promoted to colonel. While in command at Watertown, he created the Taylor System of Scientific Management, which was intended to bring efficiency to the process of artillery weapons and equipment design, testing, procurement, and fielding.

In March 1917, Wheeler rejoined the office of the Chief of Ordnance with orders to establish a nitrogen manufacturing plant. Following American entry into World War I in April 1917, he was assigned to command of the Ordnance Department's Supply Division. On August 5, 1917, he was promoted to brigadier general in the National Army. In December 1917, Wheeler was appointed acting Chief of Ordnance while incumbent William Crozier performed temporary wartime duty outside Washington, D.C. In March 1918, Wheeler was assigned as chief ordnance officer of the American Expeditionary Forces and he served in France until October 1918, when he was appointed chief ordnance officer for U.S. forces in Great Britain and commander of Base Section Number 3, Services of Supply. While assigned to London, he was responsible for settling accounts for war materiel the U.S. had purchased from Great Britain. In May 1919, he was appointed head of the U.S. Military Commission for Czechoslovakia.

In July 1919, Wheeler returned to the United States and returned to his permanent rank of colonel. He served again in the Office of the Chief of Ordnance until he retired as a colonel on September 3, 1919. In June 1930, the U.S. Congress passed legislation enabling the general officers of World War I to retire at their highest rank, and Wheeler was promoted to brigadier general on the army's retired list.

== Awards ==
Wheeler received the Army Distinguished Service Medal for his First World War service. In addition, he received the Legion of Honour (Commander) from France and the honorary Order of the Bath (Companion) from the United Kingdom.

=== Army Distinguished Service Medal citation ===
The President of the United States of America, authorized by Act of Congress, July 9, 1918, presents the Army Distinguished Service Medal to Brigadier General Charles Brewster Wheeler, United States Army, for meritorious and distinguished services to the Government of the United States, in a duty of responsibility during World War I. General Wheeler initiated, organized, and developed the plans for the operation of the Supply Division in the Office of the Chief of Ordnance, which division received, transported, warehoused, issued, and maintained all items of ordnance stores and equipment manufactured and purchase for issue to the Army during the war. With business acumen and with the full conception of the magnitude and intricacy of the complex problems involved, he brought a working organization. By his vision and comprehension of conditions and the needs of the service and by his energy to insure constant supply of ordnance materials, he rendered service of signal worth to the Government in a position of responsibility.

Service: Army Rank: Brigadier General Division: Office of the Chief of Ordnance General Orders: War Department, General Orders No. 56 (1922)

== Later life ==
After leaving the army, Wheeler resided in Pittsfield, Massachusetts, where he was vice president of manufacturing for the Eaton, Crane and Pike Company, a paper manufacturer, from 1919 until retiring in 1933. While living in Pittsfield, he was president of the city's Community Fund Association from 1925 to 1927. In 1930, he was nominated by the governor to serve as chairman of the Massachusetts War Memorial Investigating Committee. He was a member of the Sons of the American Revolution as a result of his descent from David Safford, a militia soldier from Vermont. He was a member of the Army and Navy Club and Metropolitan Club in Washington, D.C., Boston's St. Botolph Club, and the University Club of New York.

In 1943, Wheeler left Pittsfield to live with his daughter and son-in-law in Wayland, Massachusetts. He died in Wayland on April 11, 1946. Wheeler was buried at Pittsfield Cemetery in Pittsfield.

== Family ==
On April 3, 1893, Wheeler married Zella Lentilhon of New York City (1867–1916). On March 24, 1921, he married Mrs. Ruth Whitmore Parker of Hartford, Connecticut (1879–1928). With his first wife, he was the father of two children, son Lentilhon Wheeler and daughter Zella. Lentilhon Wheeler (1898–1926) was a West Point graduate and World War I veteran who died at age 28 after contracting tuberculosis. Zella Trelawney Safford Wheeler (1907–2004) was a graduate of Wellesley College and the wife of architect G. Seth Nichols. In addition, Wheeler was the stepfather of his second wife's sons Whitmore, William, and Robert Parker.
