= George Washington Gatchell =

United States Army general

- Born: February 22, 1865; Rhode Island, United States
- Died: February 4, 1939 (aged 73); San Diego, California, United States
- Spouse: Eva Wade Carpenter (m. 1888–1939)
- Children: 2
- Military career
- Allegiance: United States
- Branch: United States Army
- Service years: 1887–1919
- Rank: Brigadier General
- Service number: 0-13406
- Units: Field Artillery Branch; Coast Artillery Corps
- Commands: 31st Heavy Artillery Brigade; 75th Coast Artillery Regiment
- Wars: Sioux Wars; Spanish–American War; World War I • Second Battle of the Marne • Third Battle of the Aisne • Meuse-Argonne Offensive

Brigadier General George Washington Gatchell (February 22, 1865 – February 4, 1939) was a United States Army officer in the late 19th and early 20th centuries. He served in several conflicts, including the Sioux Wars, Spanish–American War, and World War I.

== Military career ==
Gatchell was born in Rhode Island on February 22, 1865. He graduated, 13th in a class of 64, from the United States Military Academy in June 1887 and was commissioned into the United States Army Field Artillery Branch. Among his classmates included several men who would later rise to the rank of brigadier general or higher in their military careers. They included: Charles B. Wheeler, Edward C. Young, Richmond P. Davis, Edgar Russel, George O. Squier, Ernest Hinds, Charles H. Martin, P. D. Lochridge, Nathaniel F. McClure, William C. Rivers, William Weigel, Thomas G. Hanson, Herman Hall, Marcus D. Cronin, Alexander L. Dade, Charles S. Farnsworth, Charles Gerhardt, James T. Dean, Ulysses G. McAlexander, Edmund Wittenmyer, Frederic D. Evans, Michael J. Lenihan, Mark L. Hersey and Frank H. Albright.

After serving in the 5th Field Artillery Regiment, Gatchell transferred to the Coast Artillery. He participated in the Sioux Wars between 1890 and 1891 and he taught at Vermont Academy from 1981 to 1895 as a professor of Military Science. Gatchell served with the Siege Artillery in Ybor City in 1898, during the Spanish–American War. He oversaw mortar-firing tests in Portland, Maine, between 1901 and 1902, and in the latter year, he went to Cuba. In the winter of 1905 and 1906, Gatchell, participated in a march from Fort Riley to Fort Sam Houston. He commanded Fort Rosecrans and the San Diego District in 1907 and Fort Strong in 1910. After serving with the Rhode Island National Guard from 1911 to 1915 as an instructor and inspector, Gatchell commanded Fort Williams in Maine, along with Portland's defenses, between 1915 and January 1918.

Gatchell was promoted to the rank of brigadier general on August 17, 1917, over four months after the American entry into World War I. He participated in World War I in France as part of the American Expeditionary Forces (AEF), commanding the 31st Heavy Artillery Brigade from March 1918. In August, he became the Chief of Artillery of the Third Corps. During his time in France, he participated in the Second Battle of the Marne, the Third Battle of the Aisne, and the Meuse-Argonne Offensive, the largest battle in the history of the United States Army.

After the war, due to the downsizing of the army, Gatchell reverted to his permanent rank of colonel. After commanding the embarkation camp in Pauillac, he went to the Washington, D.C., area and commanded Fort Howard and Baltimore's harbor defenses. Gatchell retired on December 6, 1919.

Congress restored Gatchell's brigadier general rank in June 1930, and he died in San Diego on February 4, 1939.

== Awards ==
- Indian Campaign Medal
- Spanish War Service Medal
- Victory Medal with three campaign stars

== Bibliography ==
- Davis, Henry Blaine Jr. (1998). Generals in Khaki. Raleigh, North Carolina: Pentland Press. ISBN 1571970886. OCLC 40298151.
- Marquis Who's Who (1975). Who Was Who In American History – The Military. Chicago, Illinois: Marquis Who's Who. ISBN 0837932017.
