= Alexander Lucian Dade =

United States Army general

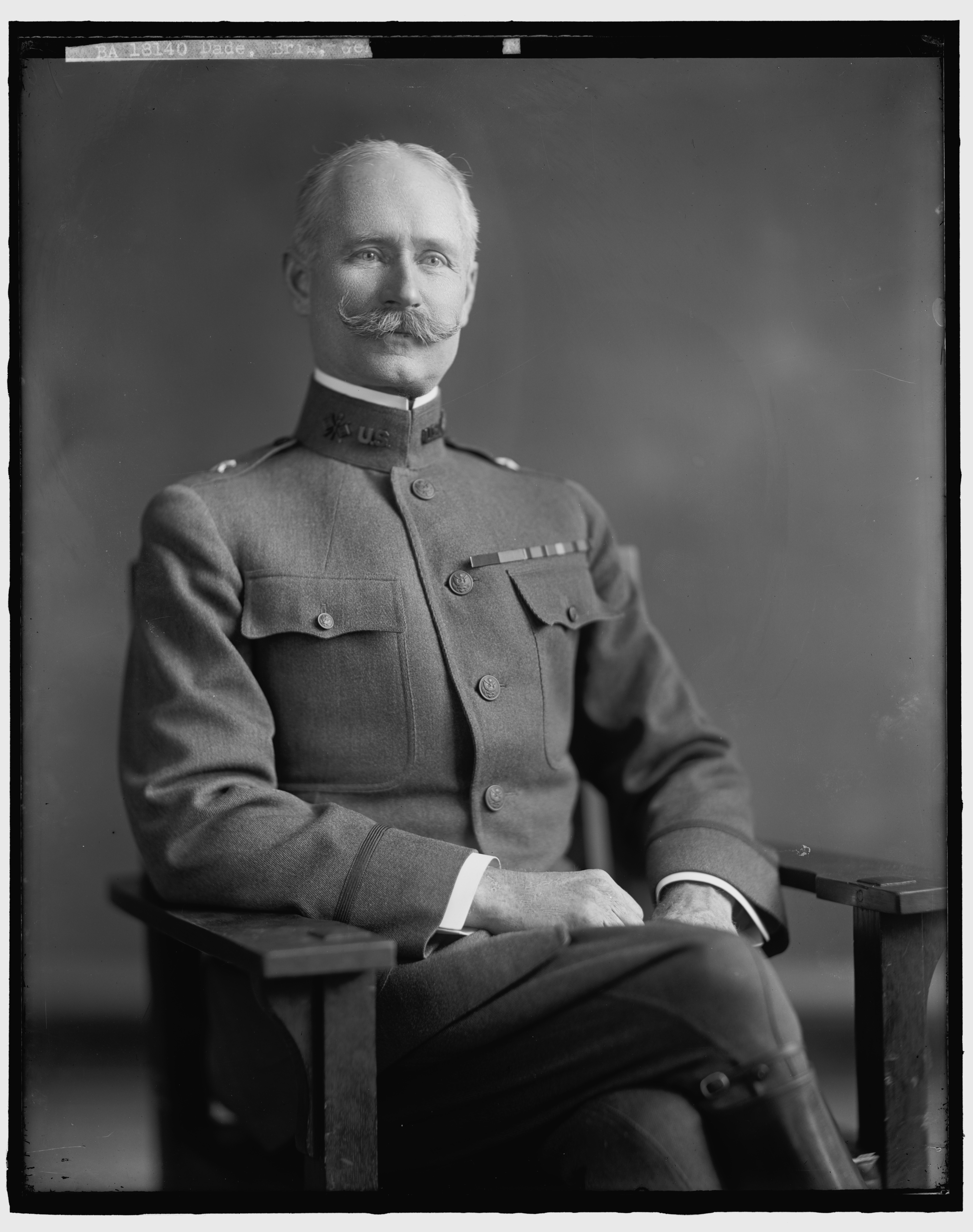
- Born: 18 July 1863; Hopkinsville, Kentucky
- Died: 8 January 1927 (aged 63); Hopkinsville, Kentucky
- Military career
- Allegiance: United States of America
- Branch: United States Army
- Service years: 1887–1920
- Rank: Brigadier General
- Service number: 0-13451
- Conflicts: Apache Wars; Spanish–American War; Philippine–American War; Mexican Punitive Expedition

Alexander Lucian Dade (18 July 1863 – 8 January 1927) was a United States military officer. He took part in a number of U.S. military conflicts, including the Spanish–American War and Philippine–American War.

== Early life and education ==
Dade was born in Hopkinsville, Kentucky on 18 July 1863. He graduated, 46th in a class of 64, from the United States Military Academy at West Point in 1887. Among his classmates who became general officers were Frank Herman Albright, Marcus Daniel Cronin, James Theodore Dean, Charles S. Farnsworth, George Washington Gatchell, Charles Gerhardt, Herman Hall, Thomas Grafton Hanson, Mark L. Hersey, Ernest Hinds, Michael Joseph Lenihan, Ulysses G. McAlexander, Nathaniel Fish McClure, William C. Rivers, George Owen Squier, Charles Brewster Wheeler, and Edmund Wittenmyer.

Dade graduated from the Infantry and Cavalry School in 1893 and the Army War College in 1910.

== Military career ==
After graduating from West Point in 1887, Dade was commissioned second lieutenant of the 13th Infantry. In 1888, Dade was transferred to the 10th Cavalry where he participated in the later stage of the Apache Wars. In 1895 he was promoted to first lieutenant of the 2nd Cavalry before being transferred to the 3rd Cavalry. As part of the 3rd Cavalry, Dade served in Cuba during the Spanish–American War, taking part in the Santiago Campaign (1898). On 9 September 1899 Dade became major in the 47th Volunteer Infantry and took part in the subsequent Philippine–American War, joining the 38th Volunteer Infantry. While in the Philippines, Dade served on the staff of General Samuel Baldwin Marks Young as an inspector during expeditions in the Northern Luzon region. In 1901, Dade was promoted to captain and in 1902 became an inspector in the Philippine Constabulary; Dade served in this capacity until 1905, when he returned to the United States and was assigned to the 9th Cavalry. In 1913, Dade was the base port inspector at Galveston, Texas and then inspector of the 2nd Division during the Vera Cruz Expedition (1914). Dade took part in the Mexican Punitive Expedition (1916–1917) during which he was promoted to colonel and served with the 7th Cavalry. Following the United States' entry into World War I, Dade was assigned to organize and head the Aviation Section of the Signal Corps on 11 April 1917. The following year he was director of aviation training at the Central Department Headquarters in Chicago and promoted to brigadier general. On 3 May 1918, Dade was honorably discharged and subsequently served in the Office of Inspector General in Chicago and department inspector in the Central Department until he retired due to disabilities in 1920.

== Personal life and death ==
Dade married Josephine Worth Sprague, daughter of General John T. Sprague and Mary (Worth) Sprague, and granddaughter of William J. Worth. They were the parents of two children: daughter Margaret and son Alexander Lucian Jr. Josephine Worth Sprague's sister Sarah was the wife of Brigadier General Henry W. Hubbell. Her sister Maggie was the wife of Brigadier General James M. J. Sanno.

Dade died on 8 January 1927 in his hometown of Hopkinsville, Kentucky. Dade was interred at Arlington National Cemetery.
