= Herman Hall =

United States Army general

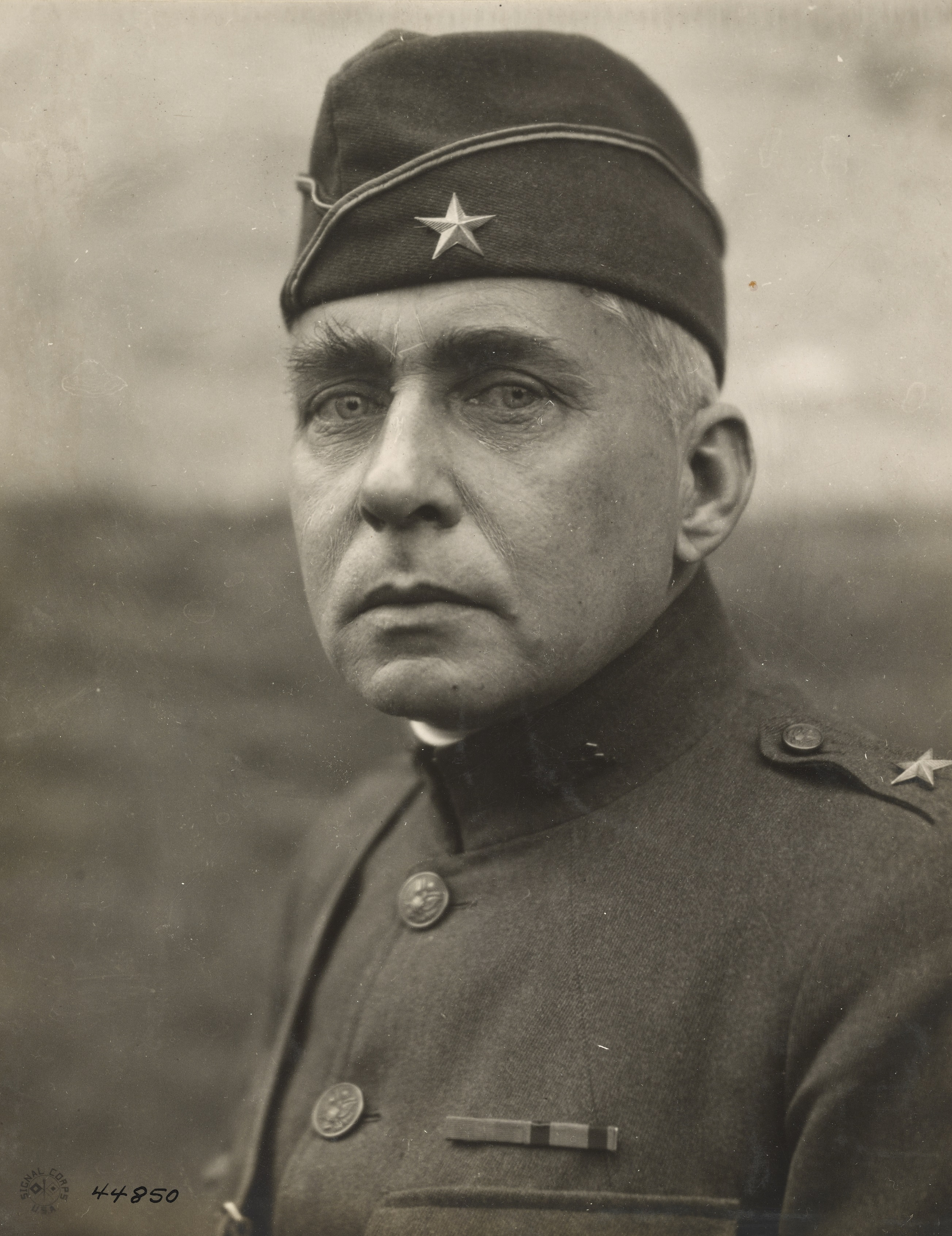
- Herman Hall as commander of the 177th infantry brigade in January 1919
- Born: June 6, 1864; Carthage, Illinois
- Died: September 6, 1928 (aged 64); Santa Barbara, California
- Spouse: Anna Grace Jack
- Military career
- Allegiance: United States
- Branch: United States Army
- Service years: 1887–1923
- Rank: Brigadier general
- Service number: 0-195
- Conflicts: Spanish–American War; Philippine–American War; World War I
- Awards: Silver Star

Herman Hall (June 6, 1864 – September 6, 1928) was a United States Army officer in the late 19th and early 20th centuries. He served in several conflicts, including World War I.

== Biography ==
Hall was born on June 6, 1864, in Carthage, Illinois. He entered the United States Military Academy (USMA) at West Point, New York in July 1883 and graduated, 42 in a class of 64, in June 1887. Among his classmates who also became general officers were Frank Herman Albright, Marcus Daniel Cronin, Alexander Lucian Dade, James Theodore Dean, Charles S. Farnsworth, George Washington Gatchell, Charles Gerhardt, Thomas Grafton Hanson, Mark L. Hersey, Ernest Hinds, Michael Joseph Lenihan, Ulysses G. McAlexander, Nathaniel Fish McClure, George Owen Squier, William C. Rivers, Charles Brewster Wheeler, and Edmund Wittenmyer.

Hall was commissioned into the 4th Infantry Regiment. After doing frontier duty, he went to Cuba because of the Spanish–American War, serving in the Sanitary Corps. Afterward, Hall went to the Philippines because of the Philippine–American War, and he received a Silver Star while there. He served as the chief of the Philippine Constabulary from 1915 to 1917.

Hall was promoted to the rank of brigadier general on August 5, 1917. He served as the temporary commander of the 80th Division from August 27 to September 9, 1917, and he commanded several infantry brigades in France. He also served in Germany. From 1919 to 1920, he commanded the 19th Infantry Regiment.

Hall retired on October 23, 1923, at his permanent rank of colonel. Living in Santa Barbara, California, Hall died on September 6, 1928. Congress restored his brigadier general rank in June 1930.

== Personal life ==
Hall married Anna Grace Jack on October 18, 1893.
