= James Theodore Dean =

United States Army general

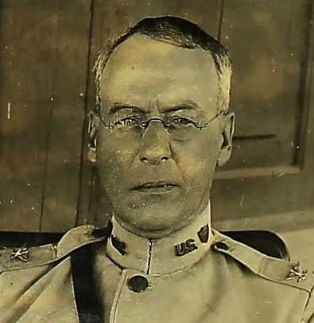
- Photo from Dean's 1922 U.S. passport application
- Born: May 12, 1865; Ironton, Ohio, U.S.
- Died: June 15, 1939 (aged 74); Gracefield, Quebec, Canada
- Burial place: Woodland Cemetery, Ironton, Ohio
- Military career
- Allegiance: United States
- Branch: United States Army
- Service years: 1887–1928
- Rank: Brigadier general
- Service number: 0-198
- Conflicts: Spanish–American War; World War I • Battle of Saint-Mihiel • Meuse-Argonne Offensive

James Theodore Dean (May 12, 1865 – June 15, 1939) was a United States Army officer in the late 19th and early 20th centuries.

== Biography ==
Dean was born on May 12, 1865, in Ironton, Ohio. He graduated 52nd in a class of 64 from the United States Military Academy in 1887. Among his classmates who also became general officers were Frank Herman Albright, Marcus Daniel Cronin, Alexander Lucian Dade, Charles S. Farnsworth, George Washington Gatchell, Charles Gerhardt, Herman Hall, Thomas Grafton Hanson, Mark L. Hersey, Ernest Hinds, Michael Joseph Lenihan, Ulysses G. McAlexander, Nathaniel Fish McClure, William C. Rivers, George Owen Squier, Charles Brewster Wheeler, and Edmund Wittenmyer.

Commissioned in the 3rd Infantry Division, Dean frequently worked in the area of ordnance. Dean served as an aide to Major General John R. Brooke between 1893 and 1895 and again from 1899 to 1902. During the Spanish–American War, he served as the Chief Ordnance Officer in Cuba and Puerto Rico. After returning to the U.S., he served in the District of Alaska from 1906 to 1908. Graduating from the United States Army War College in 1911, Dean served in the Philippines from 1912 to 1915.

Dean was temporarily promoted to the rank of brigadier general on August 5, 1917, and assumed command over the 156th Infantry Brigade which he went with on a tour of duty in France. he commanded the 78th Infantry Division between March 16 and April 20, 1918, and he participated in the Battle of Saint-Mihiel as well as the Meuse-Argonne Offensive.

Reverting to the rank of colonel after the war, Dean commanded the 20th Infantry Regiment before moving to the Adjutant General's Department. After serving two years as an adjutant of the Philippine Department in Manila, Dean commanded the 11th Infantry Regiment for another two years. On April 23, 1924, he began overseeing military recruitment in the New York area, and after this, he served as the Chief of Staff of the 77th Infantry Division. Dean retired on September 3, 1928, with his retirement rank being reinstated as brigadier general on June 21, 1930. He died on June 15, 1939, at his summer home in Gracefield, Quebec, Canada.

== Personal life ==
Dean remained single his entire life.

== Bibliography ==
- Davis, Henry Blaine Jr. (1998). Generals in Khaki. Raleigh, North Carolina: Pentland Press. ISBN 1571970886. OCLC 40298151.
- Marquis Who's Who (1975). Who Was Who In American History – The Military. Chicago, Illinois: Marquis Who's Who. ISBN 0837932017.
