= Charles Gerhardt (United States Army officer) =

United States Army general

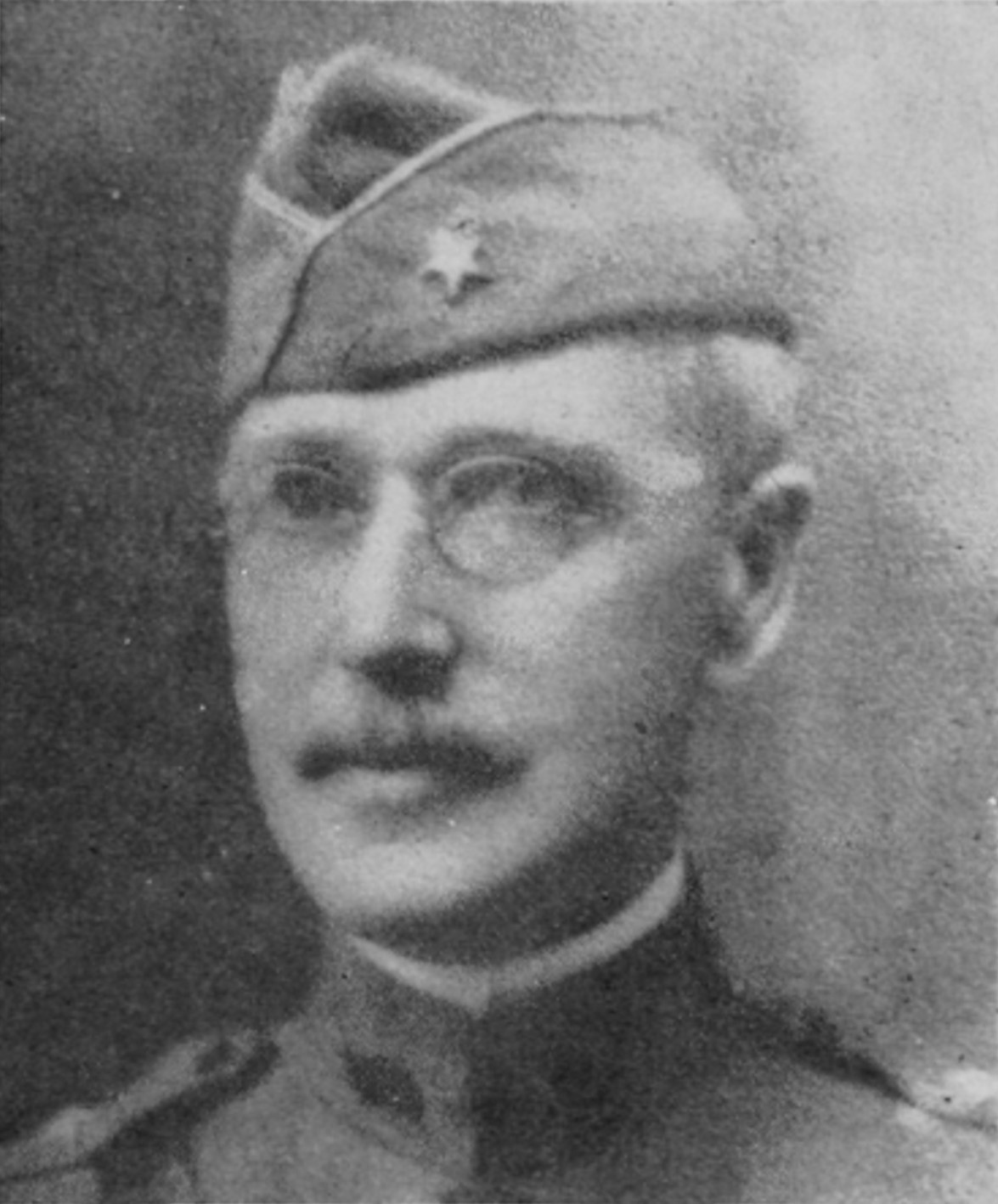
- Born: March 19, 1863; Baltimore, Maryland, United States
- Died: June 5, 1957 (aged 94); Mendham Borough, New Jersey, United States
- Burial place: Arlington National Cemetery, Virginia, United States
- Spouse: Kate Watkins
- Children: Two, including Charles H. Gerhardt
- Military career
- Allegiance: United States
- Branch: United States Army
- Service years: 1887–1927
- Rank: Brigadier General
- Service number: 0-197
- Unit: Infantry Branch
- Commands: 4th Infantry Regiment; 183rd Brigade; 161st Depot Brigade; 49th Infantry Regiment; 36th Infantry Regiment; 16th Infantry Regiment
- Conflicts: Sioux Wars; World War I

Brigadier General Charles Gerhardt (March 19, 1863 – June 5, 1957) was a United States Army officer in the late 19th and early 20th centuries. He served in several conflicts, including the Sioux Wars and World War I. He is the father of Charles H. Gerhardt, who also served as an army general.

== Military career ==
Gerhardt was born in Baltimore on March 19, 1863, to a family that had immigrated from Hesse in the early 1800s. He graduated 48th in a class of 64 from the United States Military Academy (USMA) at West Point, New York, in June 1887. Among his classmates included several men who would later rise to the rank of brigadier general or higher in their military careers. They included: Charles B. Wheeler, Edward C. Young, Richmond P. Davis, Edgar Russel, George O. Squier, Ernest Hinds, George W. Gatchell, Charles H. Martin, P. D. Lochridge, Nathaniel F. McClure, William C. Rivers, William Weigel, Thomas G. Hanson, Herman Hall, Marcus D. Cronin, Alexander L. Dade, Charles S. Farnsworth, James T. Dean, Ulysses G. McAlexander, Edmund Wittenmyer, Frederic D. Evans, Michael J. Lenihan, Mark L. Hersey and Frank H. Albright.

After graduation, Gerhardt was commissioned as a second lieutenant of Infantry, and was assigned to the 20th Infantry Regiment in Montana. After participating in the Sioux Wars from 1890 to 1891, Gerhardt worked as a professor of military science and tactics at Cumberland University from 1894 to 1897. During this time, he served as a secretary of the civilian organization U.S. Military Wheelmen. After serving in Cuba from 1899 to 1900, Gerhardt went to Minnesota and Montana. He went to Fort Gibbon in 1902, serving there for two years, and after staying in Baltimore, he was stationed in Columbus, Ohio. Gerhardt then served in the Philippines from 1906 to 1908, holding a command at Iloilo for a year.

In August 1908, Gerhardt reported to the Army Service Schools at Fort Leavenworth, Kansas. He was a distinguished graduate of the Army School of the Line in 1909 and also graduated from the Army Staff College in June 1910.

Gerhardt graduated from the United States Army War College in June 1913. That same year, he served as an instructor at the student camp at Gettysburg. After serving at the Panama Canal Zone for 18 months, Gerhardt worked at the Militia Bureau in Washington, D.C.. He led the 4th Infantry Regiment from Camp Greene to Fort Stuart in Virginia before taking it to France because of World War I. In France, he commanded the Intermediate Section, Services of Supply of the American Expeditionary Forces (AEF), and Base Section Number Seven. After his promotion to the rank of brigadier general on April 12, 1918, Gerhardt served on the front lines with the 35th Infantry Division, and he then commanded the 183rd Brigade of the 92nd Division. The 183rd Brigade's adjutant was Albert E. Brown, later a major general during World War II. Gerhardt was made an officer of the Legion of Honour by France.

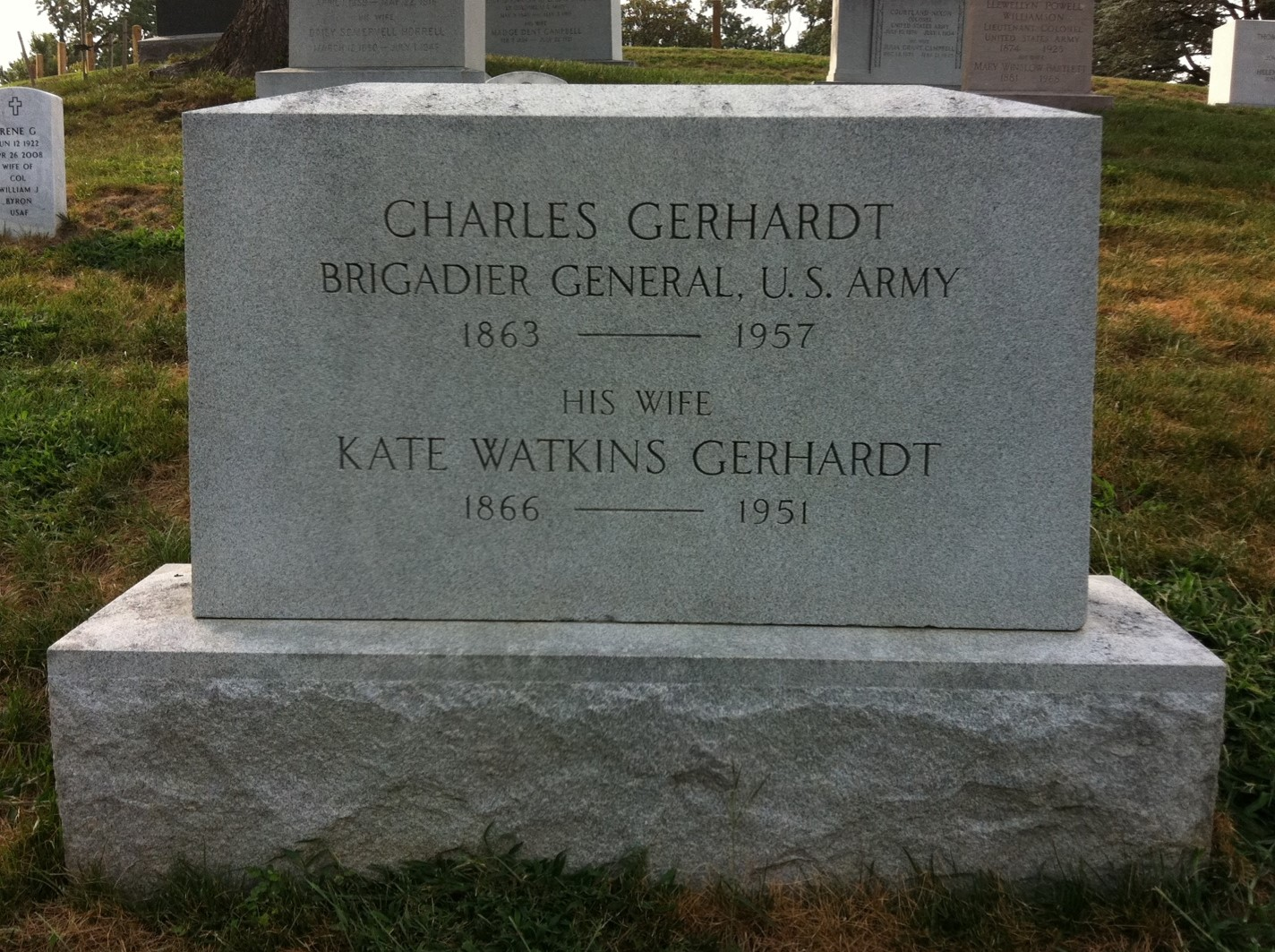
The grave of Brigadier General Charles Gerhardt at Arlington National Cemetery.

After returning to the U.S., Gerhardt commanded the 161st Depot Brigade at Camp Grant, Illinois and did demobilization work until the end of April 1919, when he was returned to his permanent rank of colonel. He commanded the 49th Infantry Regiment from May 1919 to October 1920 and the 36th Infantry Regiment from November 1920 to August 1921. Gerhardt then returned to the Army War College for a second course, graduating in June 1922. He later commanded the 16th Infantry Regiment from September 1922 until September 1924. Although he had retired as a colonel in 1927, Congress restored his brigadier general's rank in June 1930.

He died at the age of 94 in Mendham Borough, New Jersey, on June 5, 1957. He is buried at Arlington National Cemetery.

== Personal life ==
Gerhardt married Kate Watkins on November 19, 1890, and they had two children together, including Charles H. Gerhardt. He was known as "a very prolific writer who wrote about a great variety of subjects." The younger Charles Gerhardt graduated from West Point in 1917 and attaining the rank of major general as commander of the 29th Infantry Division during the Normandy landings of World War II.

== Bibliography ==
- Davis, Henry Blaine Jr. (1998). Generals in Khaki. Raleigh, North Carolina: Pentland Press. ISBN 1571970886. OCLC 40298151.
