= Charles H. Gerhardt =

United States Army general (1895–1976)

Charles Hunter Gerhardt
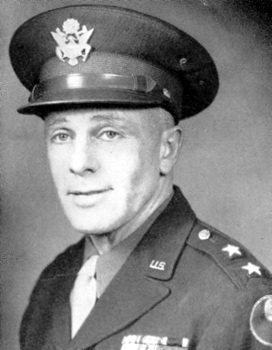
- Born: June 6, 1895; Lebanon, Tennessee, United States
- Died: October 9, 1976 (aged 81); Winter Park, Florida
- Burial place: Arlington National Cemetery, Virginia, United States
- Relatives: Charles Gerhardt (father)
- Military career
- Allegiance: United States
- Branch: United States Army
- Service years: 1917–1952
- Rank: Major General
- Nickname: "Uncle Charlie"
- Service number: 0-5259
- Unit: Cavalry Branch
- Commands: 56th Cavalry Brigade; 91st Infantry Division; 29th Infantry Division
- Conflicts: World War I World War II
- Awards: Army Distinguished Service Medal; Silver Star; Legion of Merit; Bronze Star

Charles Hunter Gerhardt (June 6, 1895 – October 9, 1976) was a major general in the United States Army who commanded the 29th Infantry Division from 1943 until the end of the war and during part of the occupation of Germany. The division's most famous combat operations were the Omaha Beach landings of June 6, 1944 (his 49th birthday), otherwise known as D-Day, the taking of the French crossroads town of Saint-Lô in July 1944, and later the capture of Brest, Jülich, and München-Gladbach.

== Early life and military career ==
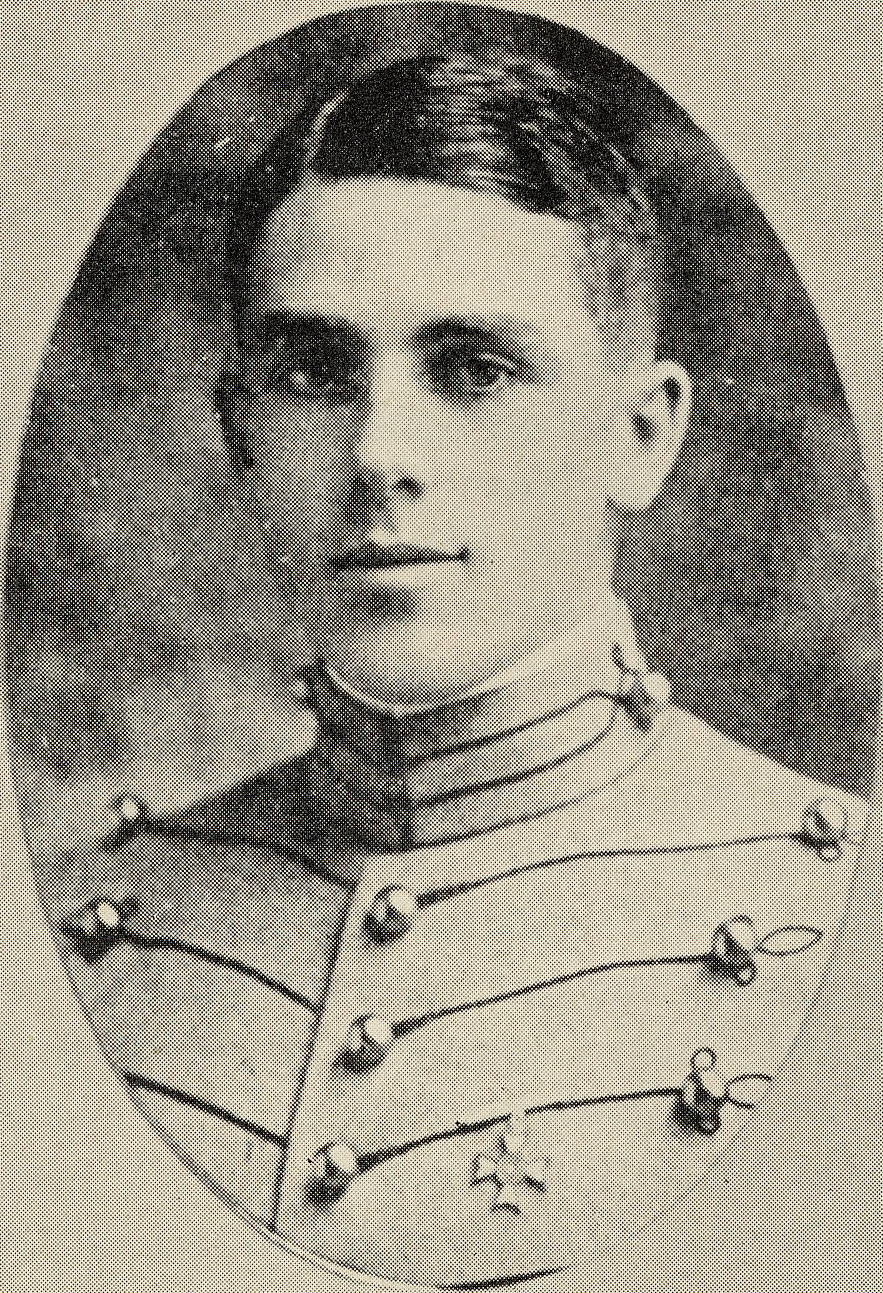
Gerhardt as a West Point cadet c. 1917

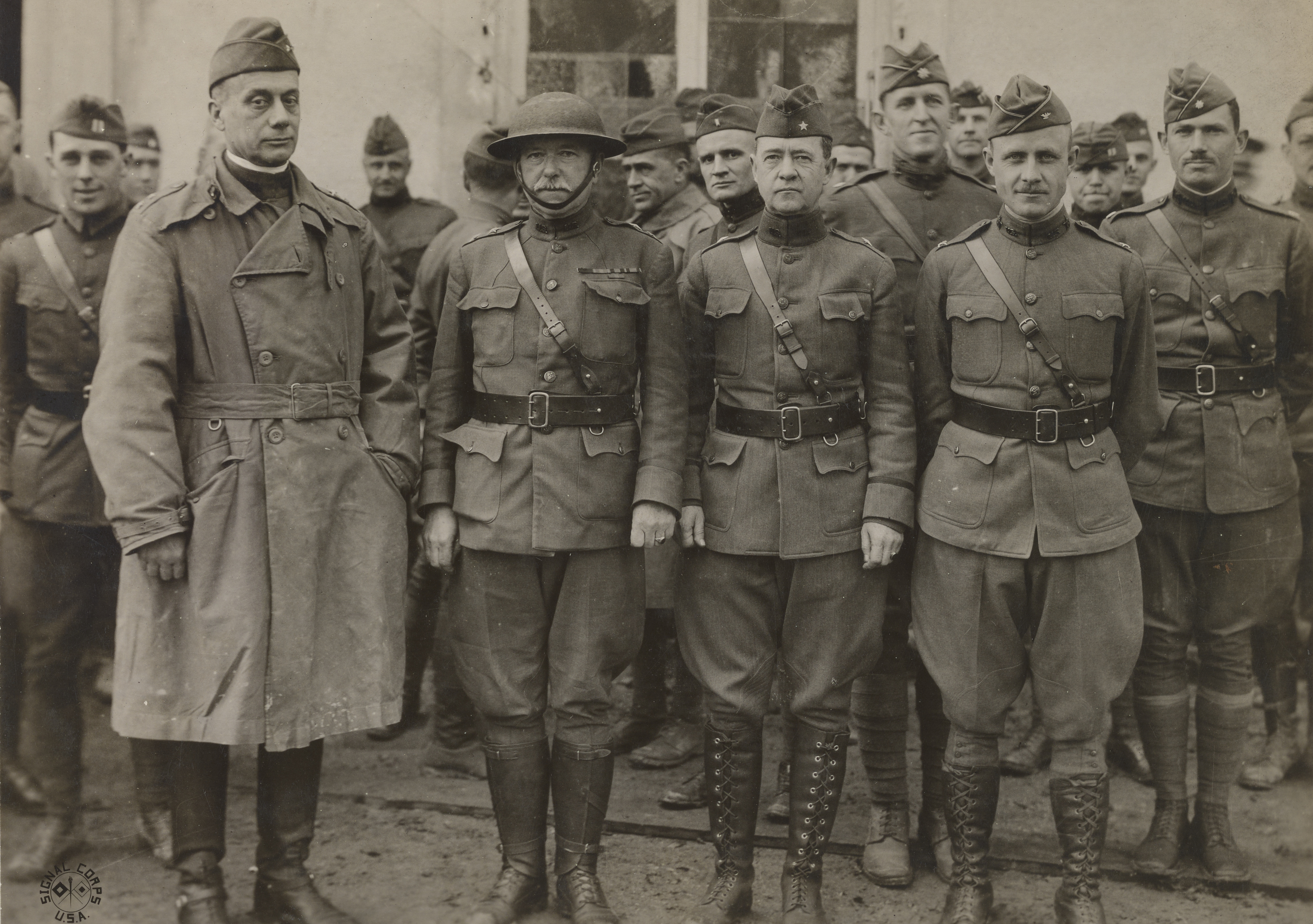
From left to right: Major General William M. Wright, commanding the 89th Division, Major General Frank L. Winn, to succeed Wright in command of the 89th, and Brigadier General Henry D. Todd Jr., commanding the 58th Field Artillery Brigade, Stenay, Meuse, France, November 12, 1918. Standing behind Wright is his aide-de-camp, Captain Charles H. Gerhardt.

Gerhardt grew up in the army as the son of Charles Gerhardt, a career officer who retired as a brigadier general. The younger Gerhardt attended the United States Military Academy (USMA) at West Point, New York, in 1913, where he earned a reputation as a skilled football, baseball and polo player. In 1916, Gerhardt quarterbacked for West Point to a 30–10 upset win over Notre Dame, which was led by the famed freshman George Gipp. It was Notre Dame's only loss that year.

Gerhardt's West Point class graduated on April 6, 1917, the day America officially declared war. Graduation was six weeks earlier than intended because of the U.S. entry into the war. Gerhardt graduated 50th in a class of 139 and was commissioned as a second lieutenant in the Cavalry Branch.

Promoted to first lieutenant on May 15, his first posting upon his graduation was with a cavalry unit in Texas. However, he later served as a staff officer with the headquarters of the 89th Division on the Western Front as part of the American Expeditionary Forces (AEF). He ended the war as aide-de-camp to Major General William M. Wright, commander of the 89th Division.

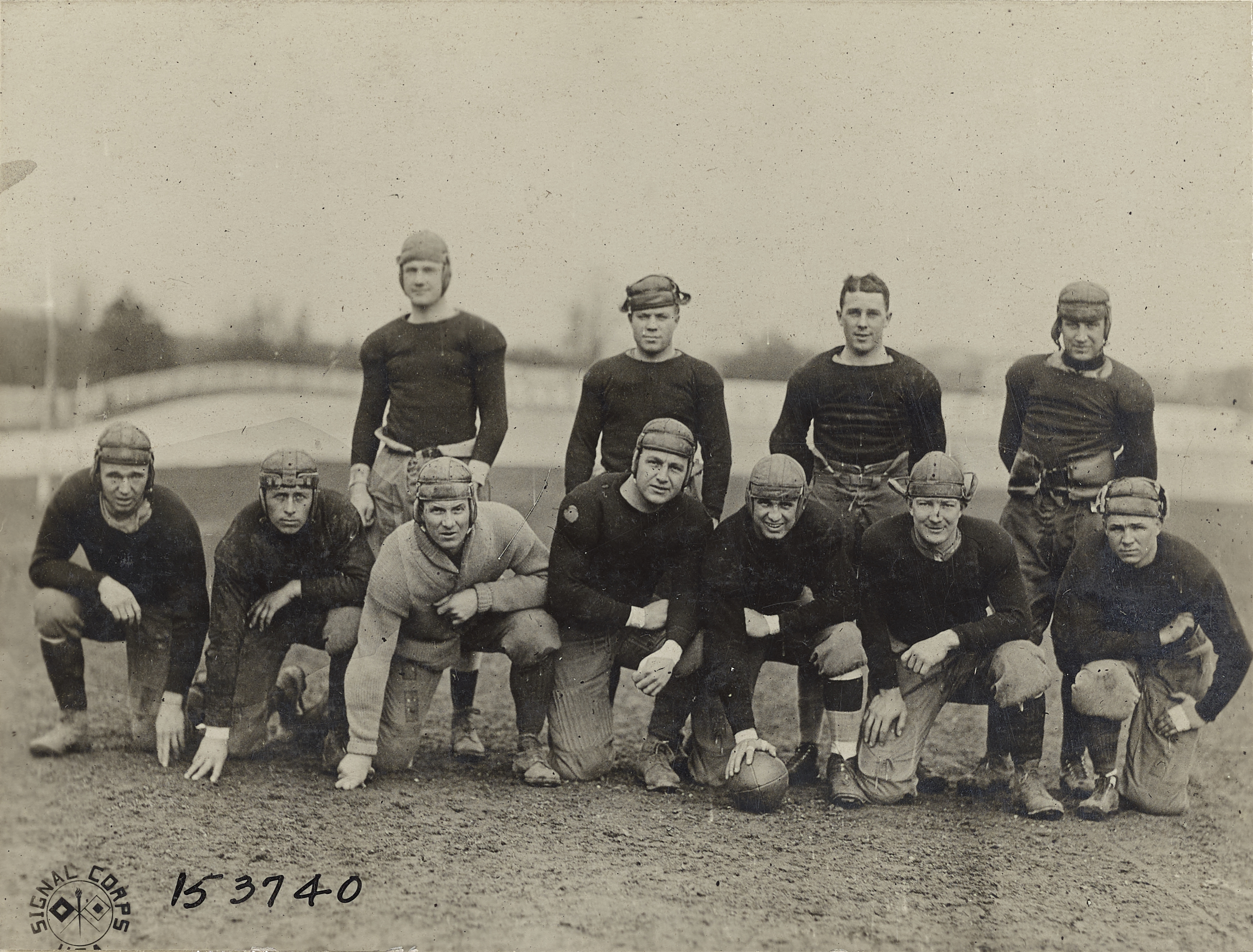
89th Division team, Gerhardt standing second from right in back row and Withington in lighter color jersey at front, Higgins bottom left, Lindsey top left and Clark top right

As part of the occupation force after the Armistice, Gerhardt played quarterback for the 89th Division squad that won the AEF football championship in March 1919. Paul Withington of the Army Medical Corps was the right guard, team captain and coach. Future head football coaches Bob Higgins, Adrian Lindsey and George Clark were also members of the squad.

== Between the wars ==
Remaining in the army during the interwar period, Gerhardt taught tactics back at the Military Academy from February 1926 to August 1931. In 1932, he was selected as a judge in the equestrian events for the 1932 Olympic Games held in Los Angeles. Gerhardt then attended the Command and General Staff School at Fort Leavenworth, Kansas, graduating in May 1933. On July 1, 1940, he was promoted to lieutenant colonel.

== World War II ==
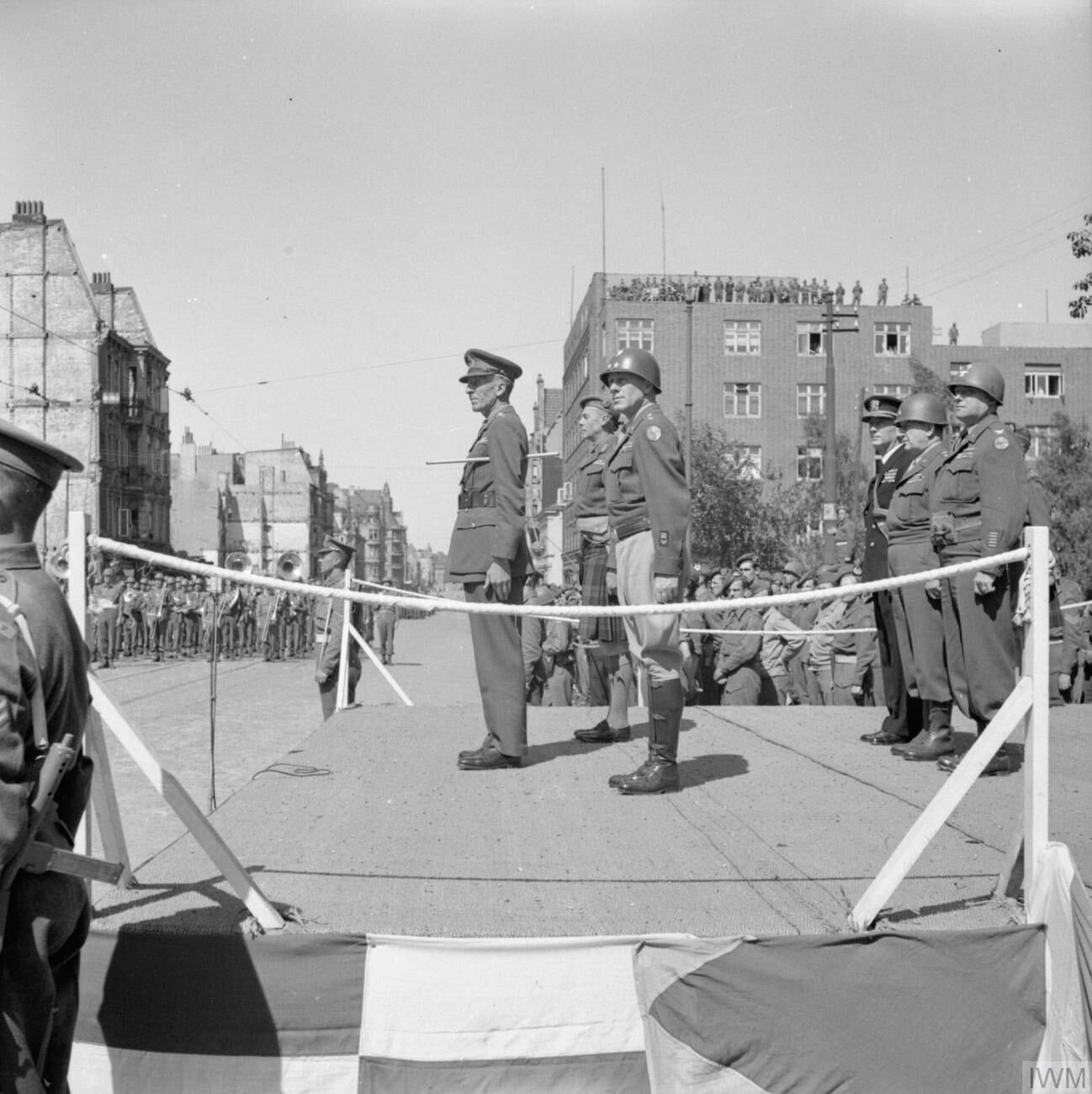
British Lieutenant General Brian Horrocks, Major General Gordon MacMillan and Major General Charles H. Gerhardt on the saluting base during the ceremony to mark the handover of Bremerhaven by British to American forces, May 1945.

By the time of the Japanese attack on Pearl Harbor and the subsequent American entry into World War II, Gerhardt was in command of the 56th Cavalry Brigade, having been in command since September 13 after receiving a promotion to the temporary rank of brigadier general on July 10, 1941.

He was again promoted, now to the two-star rank of major general, on June 26, 1942, eight months after Pearl Harbor, he was the first Commanding General (CG) of the 91st Infantry Division, an all draftee division, at Camp White, Oregon.

In July 1943, taking over from Major General Leonard T. Gerow, he assumed command of the 29th Infantry Division, a National Guard formation which was then stationed in South West England in preparation for the Allied invasion of Normandy and had been there since October 1942. In preparation for the invasion, scheduled for the spring of 1944, the division trained extensively in amphibious operations.

Major General Gerhardt was a hard taskmaster, strict disciplinarian, and considered by many of his men to be a martinet who often became upset at small things such as a soldier not having the chinstrap of his helmet buckled. One famous story has him admonishing a soldier on the day after D-Day for dropping peels from the orange he was eating on the ground. He was intolerant of any dirt or mud being on the trucks, and would make soldiers stop and clean a truck under almost any circumstance. Gerhardt was, however, a superb and driven trainer of soldiers and expected the same from his subordinates. He led the 29th Infantry Division throughout the fighting in Western Europe, from D-Day (June 6, 1944) until the end of World War II in Europe on Victory in Europe Day (May 8, 1945).

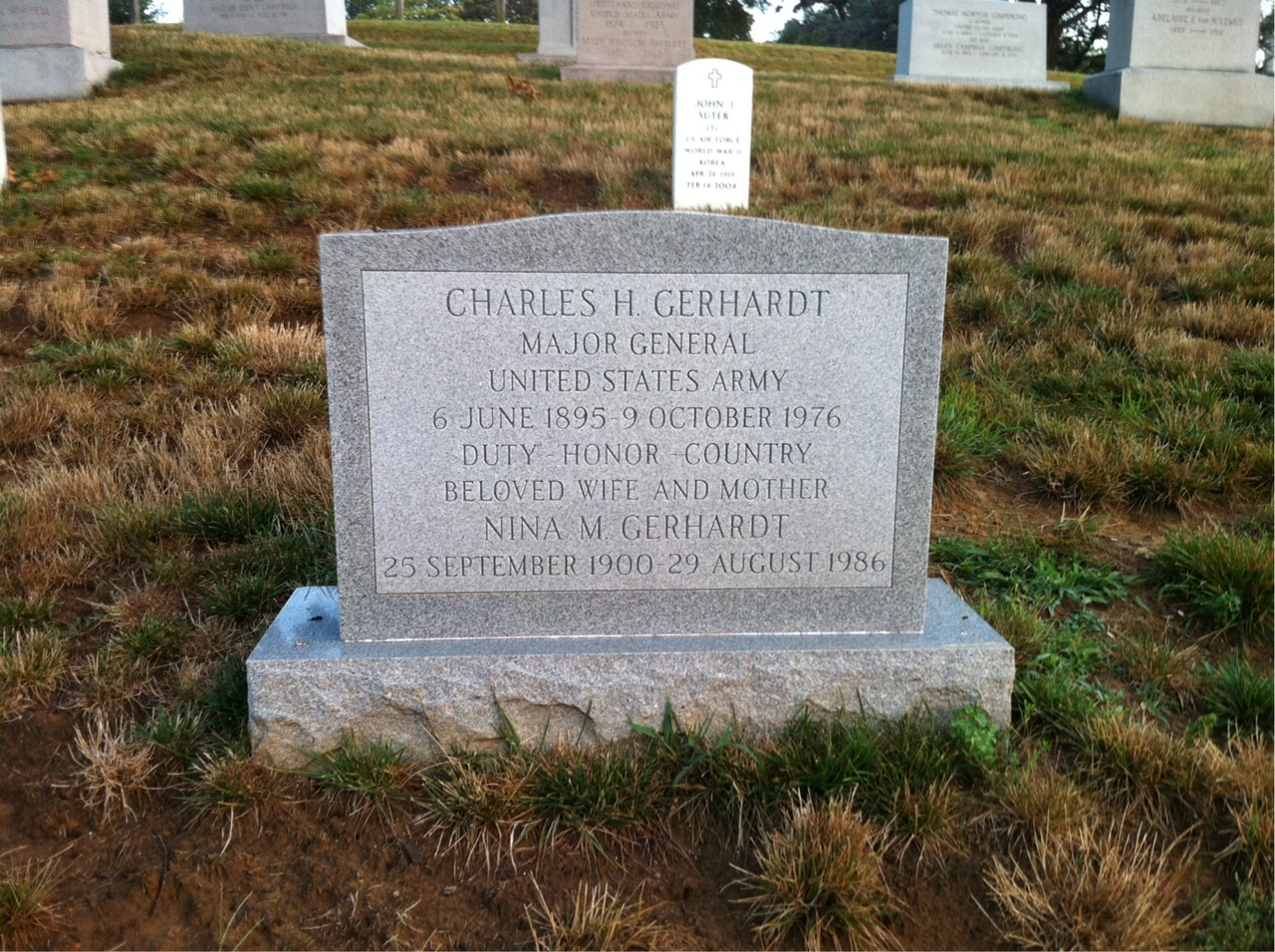
The grave of Major General Charles H. Gerhardt and his wife, Nina M. Gerhardt, at Arlington National Cemetery.

Gerhardt was one of the European Theater's more controversial commanders, usually walking the line between approval and disapproval with his superior officers. His critics held that he was lacking as a military tactician and careless with the lives of his men, often pointing to the astonishingly high casualty rate of his division, which suffered over 20,600 men killed, wounded or missing from June 6, 1944 to May 8, 1945. It was said that Gerhardt actually commanded three divisions: one on the field of battle, one in the hospital, and one in the cemetery. He was also considered somewhat loose morally, as evidenced by a house of prostitution he established for his men near Rennes, France, which U.S. 12th Army Group commander Lieutenant General Omar Bradley did not approve of and ordered closed after only being open for five hours. Gerhardt personally approved the sign posted outside, which read, "Blue and Gray Corral; Riding Lessons 100 Francs." "Blue and Gray" was the nickname of the 29th Infantry Division, which consisted of men from both sides of the Mason–Dixon line, the informal cultural boundary between Northern free states and Southern slave-holding states during the American Civil War era. After World War II, he was demoted to colonel for reasons thought to be a combination of the 29th Infantry Division's high casualty rate and his perceived moral lapses.

== Postwar ==
Following the war, Gerhardt served as the United States Defense Attaché to Brazil and in a post at Fort Meade, Maryland. He was able to retire at his highest-held rank of major general in 1952.

He died on October 9, 1976, in Winter Park, Florida, at the age of 81 and is buried at Arlington National Cemetery.

== Dates of rank ==
Insignia	Rank	Component	Date
No insignia	Cadet	United States Military Academy	June 14, 1913
	Second lieutenant	Regular Army	April 20, 1917
	First lieutenant	Regular Army	May 15, 1917
	Captain (temporary)	National Army	August 5, 1917
	Captain	Regular Army	March 30, 1920
	Major	Regular Army	September 1, 1932
	Lieutenant colonel	Regular Army	July 1, 1940
	Brigadier general (temporary)	Army of the United States	July 10, 1941
	Major general (temporary)	Army of the United States	July 19, 1942 (terminated April 30, 1946)
	Colonel (temporary)	Army of the United States	December 28, 1945
	Major general	Regular Army, retired	1952

== Awards ==
His awards include:

- Army Distinguished Service Medal
- Silver Star
- Legion of Merit
- Bronze Star

His foreign awards include:

- Croix de Guerre (Belgium)
- Order of the Crown (Belgium)
- Order of Military Merit (Brazil)
- Croix de Guerre with palm (France)
- Legion of Honour (France)
- Order of Orange-Nassau (the Netherlands)
- Order of the Patriotic War First Class (Union of Soviet Socialist Republics)

== See also ==
- The Major of St. Lo

== Bibliography ==
- Balkoski, Joseph (2005). Beyond the Beachhead: The 29th Infantry Division in Normandy. Stackpole Books. ISBN 978-0811738446.
- 29 Let's Go! A History of the 29th Infantry Division in World War II, by Joseph Ewing

Military offices
Preceded by Newly activated organization	Commanding General 91st Infantry Division; 1942–1943	Succeeded by William G. Livesay
Preceded by Leonard T. Gerow	Commanding General 29th Infantry Division; 1943–1946	Succeeded by Post deactivated
