= Marcus Daniel Cronin =

United States Army general

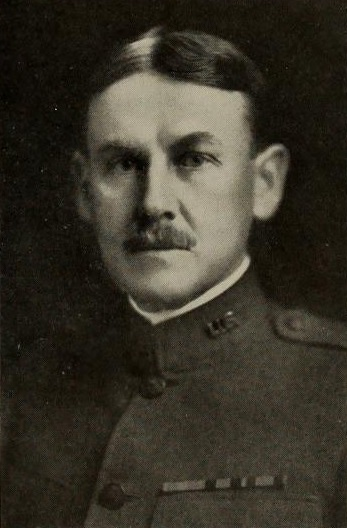
- From 1920's Holy Cross College Service Record, War of 1917
- Born: 9 January 1865; Worcester, Massachusetts, U.S.
- Died: 12 August 1936 (aged 71); Governors Island, New York, U.S.
- Burial place: San Francisco National Cemetery
- Education: College of the Holy Cross; United States Military Academy
- Military career
- Allegiance: United States of America
- Branch: United States Army
- Service years: 1887–1926
- Rank: Brigadier General
- Service number: 0-196
- Conflicts: Spanish–American War; Philippine–American War; World War I

Marcus Daniel Cronin (9 January 1865 – 12 August 1936) was a United States military officer. He served in a number of conflicts, including the Spanish–American War, Philippine–American War and World War I.

== Early life and education ==
Cronin was born in Worcester, Massachusetts on 9 January 1865. He attended the College of the Holy Cross, then attended the United States Military Academy, from which he graduated, 45th in a class of 64, in 1887. Many of Rivers's classmates became general officers during the First World War, including Frank Herman Albright, Alexander Lucian Dade, James Theodore Dean, Charles S. Farnsworth, George Washington Gatchell, Charles Gerhardt, Herman Hall, Thomas Grafton Hanson, Mark L. Hersey, Ernest Hinds, Michael Joseph Lenihan, Ulysses G. McAlexander, Nathaniel Fish McClure, William C. Rivers, George Owen Squier, Charles Brewster Wheeler, and Edmund Wittenmyer.

== Military career ==
On 12 January 1887, Cronin was commissioned as a second lieutenant of the infantry and served on the United States frontier from 1887 to 1893. After his frontier duty, Cronin became an instructor at West Point from 1893 to 1897. With the outbreak of the Spanish–American War, Cronin became regimental adjutant of the 25th Infantry and served in the Santiago Campaign of 1898; during his time in Cuba, Cronin was also a member of the Sanitary Corps. Later, Cronin attended the Army War College and graduated in 1911. In the subsequent Philippine–American War, Cronin served as colonel of the United States Volunteers and later became assistant chief of the Philippine Constabulary from 1915 to 1917. Following the United States' entry into World War I, Cronin was promoted to brigadier general of the National Army on 5 August 1917. He became commander of the 163rd Infantry Brigade at Camp Gordon, serving in France as part of the American Expeditionary Force. Cronin later retired in 1925.

== Personal life and death ==
Cronin married Helen Hannay on 2 August 1893. He lived in La Jolla, California, and later died in Governors Island, New York, on 12 August 1936. He was buried at San Francisco National Cemetery.
