= Frank Herman Albright =

U.S. Army brigadier general

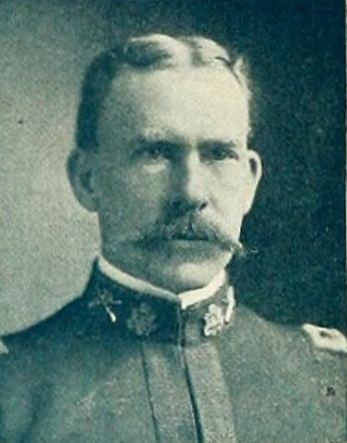
- Albright as a captain in 1904. From The Debris, the Purdue University yearbook
- Born: August 2, 1865; Ottawa, Ohio, U.S.
- Died: July 21, 1940 (aged 74); San Diego, California, U.S.
- Burial place: Mount Hope Cemetery, San Diego, California
- Spouse: Minnie L. Scott (m. 1891–1940, his death)
- Relatives: Winfield Scott (chaplain) (father in law)
- Military career
- Allegiance: United States
- Branch: United States Army
- Service years: 1887–1919
- Rank: Brigadier General
- Service number: 0-13384
- Unit: U.S. Army Infantry Branch
- Commands: Company E, 25th Infantry Regiment; 1st Battalion, 14th Infantry Regiment; 3rd Battalion, 25th Infantry Regiment; 54th Infantry Regiment; 151st Infantry Brigade; 56th Infantry Brigade; Haute-Garonne Leave Area; 21st Infantry Regiment
- Conflicts: Spanish–American War; Philippine–American War; World War I

Frank Herman Albright (August 2, 1865 – July 21, 1940) was a career officer in the United States Army. A veteran of the Spanish–American War, Philippine–American War, World War I, he attained the rank of brigadier general, and was most notable for his First World War command of the 151st Infantry Brigade and the 56th Infantry Brigade.

== Early life ==
Albright was born in Ottawa, Ohio on August 2, 1865, the son of William I. Albright and Mary (Shierlow) Albright. He entered the United States Military Academy and graduated 64th of 64 in the class of 1887. After graduating, he was commissioned as a second lieutenant of Infantry and assigned to the 12th Infantry Regiment at Fort Sully, Dakota Territory, and soon afterwards he was reassigned to Company G, 9th Infantry at Fort Bowie, Arizona.

Many of Rivers's classmates became general officers during the First World War, including Marcus Daniel Cronin, Alexander Lucian Dade, James Theodore Dean, Charles S. Farnsworth, George Washington Gatchell, Charles Gerhardt, Herman Hall, Thomas Grafton Hanson, Mark L. Hersey, Ernest Hinds, Michael Joseph Lenihan, Ulysses G. McAlexander, Nathaniel Fish McClure, William C. Rivers, George Owen Squier, Charles Brewster Wheeler, and Edmund Wittenmyer.

== Start of career ==
In 1888, Albright's regiment was posted to Fort Huachuca, Arizona. In 1891, the 9th Infantry was reassigned to Madison Barracks, New York. In 1895, Albright was promoted to first lieutenant and transferred to the 25th Infantry at Fort Buford, North Dakota. His subsequent assignments included Fort Assiniboine, Montana and professor of Military Science and Tactics at the University of North Dakota.

== Spanish–American War ==
At the start of the Spanish–American War in 1898, Albright inducted eight companies of the North Dakota National Guard and two South Dakota cavalry troops raised by Melvin Grigsby into the United States Volunteers. He led a company of North Dakota soldiers in Puerto Rico during the summer of 1898, then performed duty with the 11th Infantry Regiment. In September, he was assigned to duty at Fort Grant, Arizona. In March 1899, Albright was promoted to captain in the 25th Infantry.

== Philippine–American War ==
In August 1899, the 25th Infantry was posted to the Philippines for duty during the Philippine–American War. As commander of the regiment's Company E, Albright served in the province of Zambales, including duty in the towns of Santa Cruz and Masinloc. In August 1902, Albright led his company back to the United States and its new posting at Fort Reno, Oklahoma. He remained in command until January 1903.

== Continued career ==
From January 1903 to September 1905, Albright was assigned as professor of Military Science and Tactics at Purdue University. Following this posting, he returned to company command at Fort Reno, where he remained until January 1906. He continued in company command at Fort Bliss, Texas from January to July 1906. From July 1906 to June 1907, he was the commissary officer for the 25th Infantry, and he continued in this assignment after the regiment was posted to the Presidio of San Francisco.

From September 1907 to June 1909, Albright served as regimental commissary during the 25th Infantry's service in the Philippines, first at Parang, Maguindanao del Norte, and then at Zamboanga City. After returning to the United States with his regiment, Albright was assigned to Fort Lawton, Washington. From September 1910 to March 1911, Albright again commanded a company of the 25th Infantry. In March 1911, he was promoted to major.

From March 1911 to August 1914, Albright commanded 1st Battalion, 14th Infantry, first at Fort Abraham Lincoln, North Dakota, then at Fort George Wright, Washington. In August 1914, he began attendance at the United States Army War College. After graduating in June 1915, he was assigned to Schofield Barracks, Hawaii where he commanded 3rd Battalion, 25th Infantry. In July 1916, he received promotion to lieutenant colonel.

== World War I ==
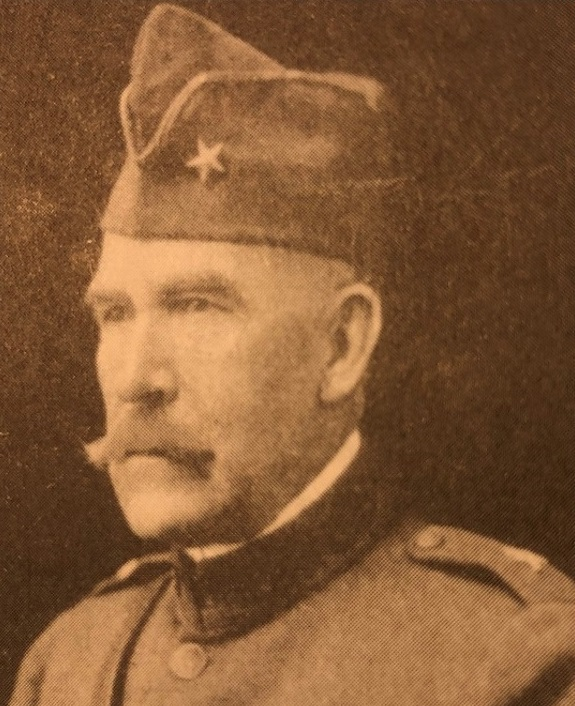
Albright as a brigadier general in 1918

In May 1917, Albright was promoted to colonel and assigned to command of the 54th Infantry Regiment. On August 5, 1917 he was promoted to temporary brigadier general. He commanded the 151st Infantry Brigade, a unit of the 76th Division, at Camp Devens, Massachusetts. He led the brigade during service in France, and later commanded the 56th Infantry Brigade, part of the 28th Infantry Division.

After the war, Albright commanded the Haute-Garonne Leave Area. On November 27, 1918, he was reduced to his permanent rank of colonel. Upon returning to the United States, he commanded the 21st Infantry Regiment at Fort George Wright.

== Retirement and death ==
In July 1919, Albright retired from the Army with the rank of colonel. In June 1930, Congress passed legislation allowing the general officers of World War I to retire at the highest rank they had held, and he was promoted to brigadier general on the retired list. After leaving the Army, Albright resided in San Diego. He was active in several veterans, civic, and fraternal organizations, including the Army and Navy Club of San Diego, Veterans of Foreign Wars, United Spanish War Veterans, the San Diego Club, the San Diego High Hatters Club, and the Military Order of the Carabao.

Albright died in San Diego on July 21, 1940. He was buried at Mount Hope Cemetery in San Diego.

== Family ==
In 1891, Albright married Minnie L. Scott (1865-1963). Her father Winfield Scott (chaplain) served in the Union Army during the American Civil War and was later chief chaplain of the Grand Army of the Republic. They were married until his death, and had no children.
