= Gillem =

Gillem is a surname. Notable people with the surname include:

- Alvan Cullem Gillem (1830–1875), Union Army officer
- Alvan Cullem Gillem II (1917–2009), United States Air Force general
- Alvan Cullom Gillem Jr. (1888–1973), United States Army general
- Gladys Gillem (1920–2009), American professional wrestler
- Jenks Gillem (c. 1890 – 1951), American football player and coach

== See also ==
- Fort Gillem, a former United States Army post in Forest Park, Georgia
