= Alvan Cullem Gillem II =

United States Air Force general

Alvan C. Gillem II
- Born: April 20, 1917; Nogales, Arizona, United States
- Died: September 3, 2009 (aged 92)
- Burial place: Arlington National Cemetery
- Relatives: Lieutenant General Alvan Cullom Gillem Jr.
- Military career
- Allegiance: United States
- Branch: United States Army Air Corps; United States Army Air Forces; United States Air Force
- Service years: 1940–1973
- Rank: Lieutenant General
- Commands: Air University; Eighth Air Force; 3d Air Division; 823d Air Division; 57th Air Division; 820th Air Division; 380th Bombardment Wing; 108th Fighter-Bomber Wing
- Conflicts: World War II; Vietnam War
- Awards: Air Force Distinguished Service Medal (3); Legion of Merit; Distinguished Flying Cross (2); Air Medal (16)

Alvan Cullem Gillem II (April 20, 1917 – September 3, 2009) was a United States Air Force officer who reached the rank of lieutenant general.

== Family ==
Gillem was the first son of Lieutenant General Alvan Cullom Gillem Jr. (1888–1973) and Virginia (Harrison) Gillem (December 18, 1895 – October 25, 1964). He had two siblings, Richard D. Gillem (who became a lieutenant colonel in the United States Army) and Mary.

== Military career ==
Gillem enlisted in the United States Army at Fort Monroe, Virginia, in 1935. He received a congressional appointment to the United States Military Academy for the fall of 1936, from which he graduated with the rank of second lieutenant in the spring of 1940.

Gillem immediately entered pilot training in the fall of 1940 and graduated in March 1941 as a first lieutenant. He then served in Texas as a pilot-instructor from March 1941 to March 1943; he was promoted to major in 1943. In April 1943 he went overseas as a staff officer at headquarters of the Mediterranean Allied Air Forces in North Africa. Later he was transferred to the 31st Fighter Group in Italy where he learned to fly Spitfires and P-51 Mustangs, and was credited with shooting down three enemy planes in air-to-air combat. He was promoted to lieutenant colonel in May 1944. In June he returned to the United States to serve in the Plans Division of the Headquarters, Army Air Forces in Washington, D.C.

In March 1946 Gillem was a member of the original cadre that set up the Strategic Air Command's headquarters at Andrews Air Force Base, Maryland. Gillem graduated from Air Command and Staff School in 1948. He was then seconded to the CIA from 1948 to 1950.

In July 1950 Gillem was promoted to colonel. He was then assigned to Turner Air Force Base, Georgia, as deputy commander of the 31st Fighter Wing. In March 1951 he was assigned as Commander, 108th Fighter-Bomber Wing at Turner AFB. In December 1951 Gillem went to England as Commander, RAF Upper Heyford, a part of Strategic Air Command's 7th Air Division.

In 1953 Gillem attended the Air War College. In 1954 he was then assigned to be the deputy commandant, Command and Staff School, Air Command and Staff College.

In 1956 he became commandant of the Command and Staff School from 1956 to 1957. He then became commander of the 380th Bombardment Wing at Plattsburgh Air Force Base, New York.

In 1961 he was promoted to brigadier general and was given command of SAC's 820th Air Division at Plattsburgh AFB. In September 1961 was assigned to Westover Air Force Base, Massachusetts, as commander of the 57th Air Division.

In July 1963 he was transferred to Homestead Air Force Base, Florida, where he became commander of the 823d Air Division. In August 1963 he was promoted to major general.

Lieutenant General Alvan C. Gillem II (1968–1970)

In May 1964 Gillem was transferred to SAC headquarters at Offutt Air Force Base, Nebraska, as deputy director of Operations. In July 1965 he was named Director of Operations (later redesignated as Deputy Chief of Staff, Operations) in July 1965.

In June 1968, upon promotion to lieutenant general, he took over the 3d Air Division at Andersen Air Force Base, Guam, where for the following 26 months he commanded SAC's B-52 and KC-135 forces operating in the Western Pacific and Southeast Asia. In April 1970 the 3d Air Division was redesignated the Eighth Air Force.

Gillem became the 12th commander of Air University on August 1, 1970, retiring on November 1, 1973, after serving there for three years.

== Death ==
Gillem died in 2009. He is buried in Arlington National Cemetery.
