= John H. Hinds =

United States Army general (1898–1993)

- Born: 9 February 1898; Fort Monroe, Virginia, U.S.
- Died: 18 January 1993 (aged 94); Clermont, Florida, U. S.
- Burial place: Fort Sam Houston National Cemetery, Texas, U.S.
- Spouses: Florence Barker (1919–1952); Elizabeth H. Burkhart (1954–1993)
- Children: 1 son
- Relatives: Ernest Hinds (father)
- Military career
- Allegiance: United States
- Branch: United States Army
- Service years: 1918–1956
- Rank: Major general
- Service number: 0-12106
- Unit: Field Artillery Branch
- Conflicts: World War II; Tunisian campaign; Normandy campaign; Siegfried Line campaign; Battle of the Bulge; Central Europe campaign; Korean War
- Awards: Legion of Merit; Army Distinguished Service Medal; Silver Star (2); Bronze Star (2); Air Medal; Purple Heart; Commendation Ribbon

John Hamilton Hinds (9 February 1898 – 18 January 1993) was a United States Army major general who commanded the artillery of the 2nd Infantry Division in World War II and that of the 1st Cavalry Division in the Korean War. He was one of the two Army members of the Atomic Energy Commission's Military Liaison Committee from 1946 to 1949.

== Early life ==
John Hamilton Hinds was born in Fort Monroe, Virginia, on 9 February 1898, the son of Lieutenant Ernest Hinds, a career Army officer who later reached the rank of major general, and his wife Minerva Hatton née Miller.

== World War I ==
On 15 June 1916, Hinds entered the United States Military Academy at West Point, New York, following in the footsteps of his father, a graduate of the class of 1887. Due to the United States entry into World War I, his class graduated early on 1 November 1918, and he was commissioned as a second lieutenant in the Field Artillery Branch. He was ranked 75th in his class.

Hinds was a student officer at the United States Army Field Artillery School at Fort Sill, Oklahoma, from 1 December 1918 to 21 February 1919. He was then a student officer at the Field Artillery Basic School at Camp Zachary Taylor, Kentucky, until June 1919, when he embarked for France on a tour of the World War I battlefields there. He was promoted to first lieutenant on 1 September, and returned to Camp Zachary Taylor, on 21 October.

== Between the wars ==
On 5 August 1920, Hinds returned to Fort Sill as a battery commander and the aide-de-camp to the commanding general there (his father). He was a student officer at the Field Artillery School there again from 10 September 1921 until he graduated on 15 June 1922. He was a student officer at the Massachusetts Institute of Technology from 24 August 1922 to 24 August 1923, when he graduated with a Bachelor of Science in mathematics, and returned to West Point as an instructor in mathematics until 20 August 1927. He was stationed at Fort Sam Houston, Texas, as his father's aide from September 1927 to March 1928.

Between May 1928 and November 1929, Hinds was based at Fort Stotsenburg in the Philippines, where he was in charge of a water project worth $65,000, a $10,000 road construction project, and a $200,000 works construction program. He returned to Fort Sam Houston as a battery commander in the 12th Field Artillery Regiment on 30 March 1931. He remained there until 29 March 1934, when he became aide-de-camp to Major General Halstead Dorey, the commanding general of the Hawaiian Division and the Hawaiian Department, at Schofield Barracks in the Territory of Hawaii until 23 July 1935. He was promoted to captain on 1 November 1934, and commanded Battery D, 11th Field Artillery Regiment until 28 May 1936.

Hinds returned to the United States where he was a student officer at the United States Army Command and General Staff College at Fort Leavenworth, Kansas, from 1 September 1936 to 20 June 1937. He commanded Battery D, 18th Field Artillery Regiment at Fort Sill from 23 August 1937 to 8 August 1938, and was a student officer at the United States Army War College from 10 September 1938 to 20 June 1939.

== World War II ==
Hinds joined the War Department General Staff in Washington, D.C., where he was promoted to major on 1 July 40 and lieutenant colonel on 15 September 1941. In January 1942, he became the Assistant Artillery Officer of VI Corps. He saw service in the Tunisian campaign on attachment to the 9th Infantry Division, for which he was awarded the Bronze Star Medal. He returned to the United States in June 1943 to become the division artillery commander of the 71st Infantry Division until October 1943, with the rank of brigadier general from 19 September. He then served as the corps artillery commander of the XIII and XXI Corps at Fort Polk, Louisiana. For this service he was awarded the Commendation Ribbon.

In April 1944, Hinds went to the European Theater of Operations as the artillery commander of the First United States Army Group and its successor, the Twelfth United States Army Group. In November he became the artillery commander of the 2nd Infantry Division. He earned the Army Distinguished Service Medal, the Silver Star for gallantry at Wahlerscheid in Germany and the Bronze Star Medal at Wirtzfeld in Belgium. During the Battle of the Bulge he coordinated the fire of 348 artillery pieces. He received the Air Medal and the Purple Heart, and multiple foreign decorations.

== Korean War ==
After the war ended, Hinds reverted to his substantive rank of lieutenant colonel on 30 April 1946. He was promoted top colonel again on 11 March 1948. He served as one of the two Army members of the Atomic Energy Commission's Military Liaison Committee from August 1946 to December 1949. He served on the staff of the Far East Command in Tokyo, with the rank of brigadier general from 29 January 1950, then became the Deputy Military Governor of the Ryukyus in February 1950.

As the commander of the division artillery of the 1st Cavalry Division, he was awarded an oak leaf cluster to his Silver Star for gallantry at Yangdogwan-ni. After the war he served as the Army Secretary of the Research & Development Board in the Office of the Director of Supply Management Agencies in the Department of Defense. His final assignment was as chief of the development and test section of the Continental Army Command. He retired in as a major general in 1956.

== Later life ==
Hinds soon tired of retirement and took a position at North American Aviation in 1958. He remained there until he retired, this time for good, in 1962. He moved to Bleak Hill in Virginia, and restored its colonial appearance. He moved to Clermont, Florida, in 1977, and remained there for the rest of his life. He died there on 18 January 1993. His remains were interred at Fort Sam Houston National Cemetery in San Antonio, Texas.

== Personal life ==
Hinds married Florence Baker in 1919. They had a son, Ernest Hinds II, who followed his father and grandfather to West Point, graduating 329th in the class of 1943. The couple divorced in 1952. In 1954 he married Elizabeth H. Burkart. Through her he acquired a stepson, Edward Burhart.

== Decorations ==
Here is Major General Hinds' ribbon bar:

1st Row	Army Distinguished Service Medal	Silver Star with one bronze oak leaf cluster	Legion of Merit	Bronze Star Medal with one bronze oak leaf cluster	Fourragère
2nd Row	Purple Heart	Army Commendation Medal	World War I Victory Medal	American Defense Service Medal	Fourragère
3rd Row	American Campaign Medal	European-African-Middle Eastern Campaign Medal with five 3/16 campaign stars	World War II Victory Medal	Army of Occupation Medal	Fourragère
4th Row	National Defense Service Medal	Korean Service Medal with three 3/16 campaign stars	Order of Leopold II, degree of Officer (Belgium)	Order of Orange-Nassau, degree of Commander (Netherlands)	Fourragère
5th Row	Legion of Honor, degree of Officer (France)	French Croix de guerre 1939–1945 with palm	Order of the British Empire, Honorary Commander (United Kingdom)	Belgian Croix de guerre 1939–1945 with palm	Fourragère
6th Row	Order of the White Lion, Second Class (Czechoslovakia)	Czechoslovak War Cross 1939–1945	Order of the Patriotic War Second Class (Union of Soviet Socialist Republics)	United Nations Korea Medal	Fourragère
7th Row	Republic of Korea Presidential Unit Citation				Fourragère

== Dates of rank ==
Insignia	Rank	Component	Date	Reference
	Second Lieutenant	Field Artillery	1 November 1918	
	First Lieutenant	Field Artillery	1 September 1919	
	Captain	Field Artillery	1 November 1934	
	Major	Field Artillery	1 July 1940	
	Lieutenant Colonel	Army of the United States	15 September 1941	
	Colonel	Army of the United States	2 July 1942	
	Lieutenant Colonel	Field Artillery	11 December 1942	
	Brigadier General	Army of the United States	19 September 1943	
	Lieutenant Colonel (reverted)	Field Artillery	30 April 1946	
	Colonel	Field Artillery	11 March 1948	
	Brigadier General	Army of the United States	29 January 1950	
