= 556th Strategic Missile Squadron =

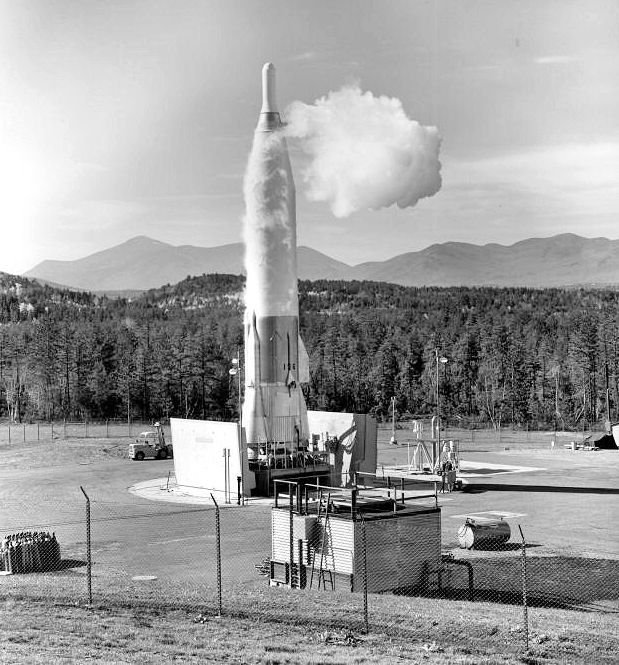
- Squadron Convair SM-65F Atlas No. 100 at Site 6 Au Sable Forks NY
- Active: 1942–1945; 1957–1959; 1961–1965
- Country: United States
- Branch: United States Air Force
- Role: Intercontinental ballistic missile
- Mottos: In Utumque Paratus (Latin for 'Ready for Anything') (1962-1965) (Note: The literal translation is "ready in either event." Maurer, Combat Squadrons, p. 658.)
- Engagements: European Theater of Operations
- Decorations: Distinguished Unit Citation

Insignia
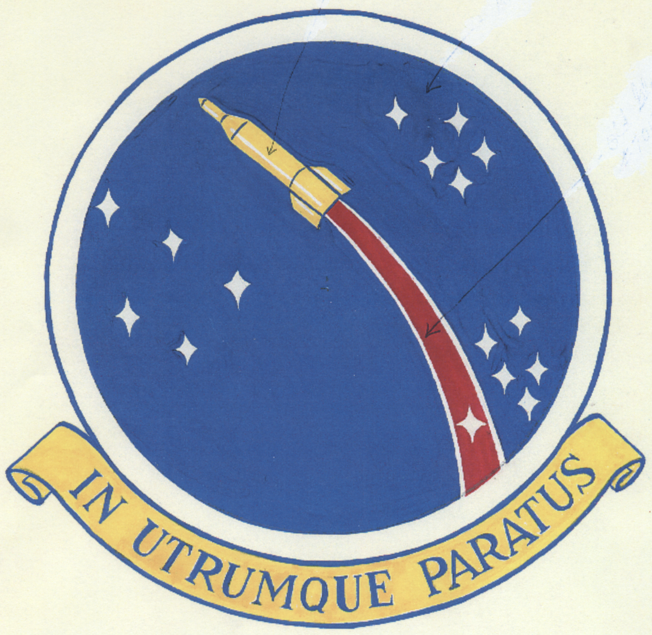
- 556th Strategic Missile Squadron emblem (Note: Approved 25 April 1962. Description: On an Air Force blue disc within a wide white border, fimbriated Air Force blue, an Air Force golden yellow missile in upward flight leaving a red trail arched to sinister base, fimbriated white; all between three groups of white lozenge-shaped stars, five in dexter, five in sinister chief, and six in sinister base (one of these last appearing in the misssile's trail).)

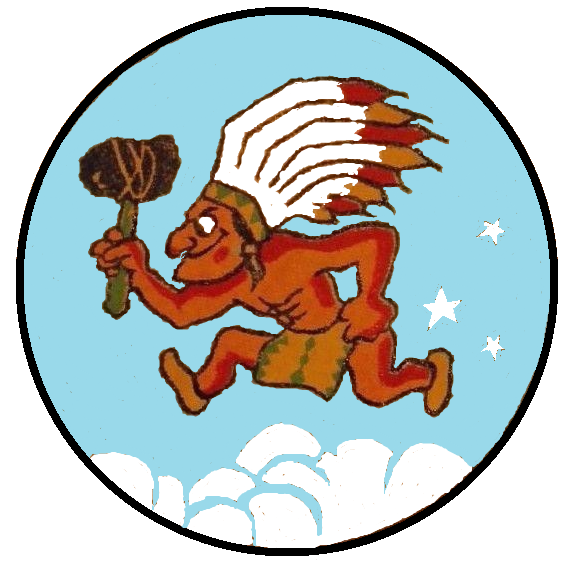
- 556th Bombardment Squadron emblem
- World War II fuselage code: FW

The 556th Strategic Missile Squadron is an inactive United States Air Force unit. It was last assigned to the 820th Strategic Aerospace Division at Plattsburgh Air Force Base, New York, where it was inactivated in 1965 with the withdrawal of the Atlas missile from operations.

The squadron was first activated during World War II as the 556th Bombardment Squadron, a Martin B-26 Marauder unit. After training in the southeastern United States, it deployed to the European Theater of Operations, where it conducted operations until April 1945, earning a Distinguished Unit Citation during the Battle of the Bulge. Following V-E Day the squadron remained in Europe until the fall of 1945, returning to the United States for inactivation in November.

The squadron became a missile unit in 1957, when it conducted tests with the SM-62 Snark in Florida. Later moving to Maine as an operational unit, it was inactivated in 1959 when Strategic Air Command reorganized its Snark missile wing. The squadron was activated again and equipped with the SM-65F Atlas Intercontinental ballistic missile, with a mission of nuclear deterrence. It was the only ICBM squadron east of the Mississippi River. The squadron was inactivated as part of the phaseout of the Atlas ICBM on 25 June 1965.

== History ==
=== World War II ===
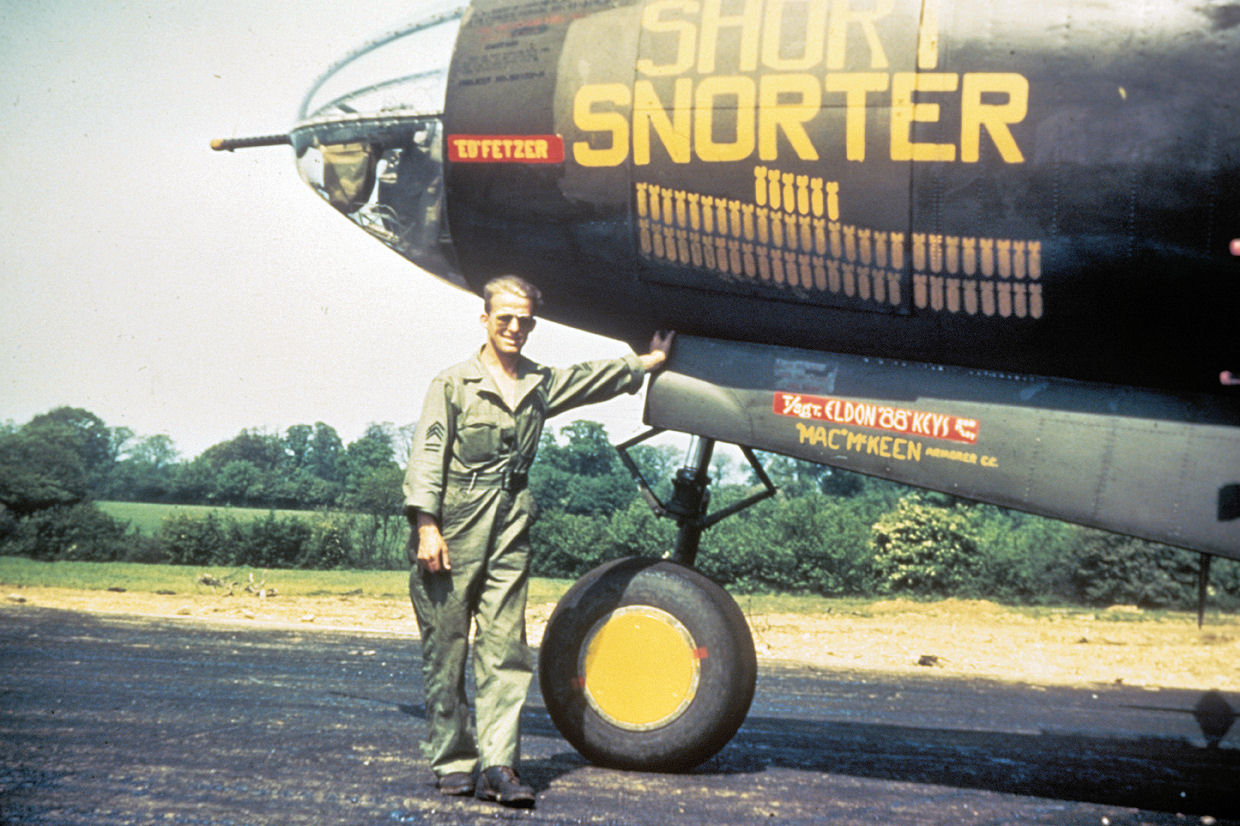
Squadron B-26 "Short Snorter", showing mission markings (Note: Aircraft is Martin B-26B-30-MA Marauder, serial 41-31900, Short Snorter, fuselage code FW-T. This plane was lost on a mission on 17 November 1944.Baugher, Joe (1 April 2023). "1941 USAF Serial Numbers". Joe Baugher.)

The 556th Bombardment Squadron was activated at MacDill Field, Florida on 1 December 1942 as one of the four squadrons of the 387th Bombardment Group and trained at bases in the southeastern United States with Martin B-26 Marauder medium bombers until June 1943, when it deployed to the European Theater of Operations. The squadron's ground echelon departed for the port of embarkation on 10 June and sailed on the RMS Queen Mary on 23 June, while the air echelon ferried its Marauders to England via the northern ferrying route.

The squadron established itself at its first base in Europe, RAF Chipping Ongar at the beginning of July 1943. Although the squadron initially trained for low level attacks, VIII Air Support Command, in consultation with the Royal Air Force, decided to employ its B-26 units in attacks at medium altitude, mirroring a decision made earlier in the Mediterranean Theater of Operations. The squadron flew its first combat mission on 15 August, with initial operations focusing on German airfields near the coast of France, in an effort to force the Luftwaffe to withdraw its interceptors from the coastal belt, reducing their effectiveness against heavy bombers passing through on their way to strike targets deeper in occupied Europe. By early September, the squadron adopted a tactic first employed by the 386th Bombardment Group, where all bombers in a formation dropped their bombs based on the lead aircraft, rather than individually, to achieve a greater concentration of bombs on the intended target. September 1943 would prove the busiest while the squadron was part of Eighth Air Force as B-26s made heavy attacks on airfields and communications sites near Boulogne as part of Operation Starkey, an attempt to make the Germans believe an invasion of France was imminent. On 9 October 1943, the squadron flew what would prove to be the last B-26 mission flown by Eighth Air Force.

In October, Ninth Air Force moved to England to take over tactical operations operating from England, building on the core of B-26 units already there. During the winter of 1943-1944, the squadron made numerous attacks on V-1 flying bomb and V-2 rocket sites. During Big Week, the squadron attacked Leeuwarden and Venlo Airfields. In the spring of 1944, the squadron attacked coastal defenses and bridges prior to Operation Overlord, the invasion of Normandy. On D-Day, it attacked targets along the coast, and supported ground forces during June 1944 by attacking line of communication targets and fuel dumps. In late July, the squadron supported Operation Cobra, the breakout at Saint Lo. During August, it attacked German forces at Brest, France.

The squadron moved to France in September, when it began operations from Maupertuis Airfield. For the rest of the war, it operated from Advanced Landing Grounds in Europe, advancing eastward with Allied ground forces. Its operations from advanced fields permitted its first attacks directly on targets in Germany by the fall of 1944. During the Battle of the Bulge, it attacked strongly defended communications and transportation targets at Mayen and Pruem, for which it was awarded a Distinguished Unit Citation. It continued to support the Allied advance into Germany, flying its last combat mission in April 1945.

After V-E Day the squadron moved to Rosieres-en-Santerre Airfield, France, where it remained until returning to the United States for inactivation in November 1945.

=== Missile operations ===
==== Snark missiles ====
The squadron was redesignated the 556th Strategic Missile Squadron and activated at Patrick Air Force Base, Florida in December 1957 and was assigned directly to Strategic Air Command (SAC). Air Research and Development Command (ARDC) had been test launching the Snark at Patrick since November 1952, although the first full range test of an operationally configured Snark did not occur until October 1957. The squadron was not only SAC's first Snark squadron, it was SAC's first missile squadron. The squadron was responsible for training Snark crews and cooperating with ARDC in conducting test launches of the Snark.

In 1959, SAC activated the 702d Strategic Missile Wing at Presque Isle Air Force Base, Maine to be the operational headquarters for its Snark missiles. The squadron was assigned to the 702d Wing in April and began moving to Presque Isle on 9 July. However, SAC decided to assign Snark missile and maintenance functions directly to the wing, and the squadron was inactivated a week later before it could complete its move to Maine.

==== Atlas missiles ====
The squadron was organized at Plattsburgh Air Force Base, New York in October 1961. The squadron was the last SM-65F Atlas squadron to be activated and with its activation all Atlas squadrons were organized. The squadron was assigned twelve missiles, based in twelve independent launch sites. The 556th was the only Atlas ICBM squadron east of the Mississippi River. The Atlas F was the final and most advanced version of the Atlas ICBM and was stored in a vertical position inside underground concrete and steel silos. When stored, the Atlas F sat atop an elevator. If a missile was placed on alert, it was fueled with RP-1 (kerosene) liquid fuel, which could be stored inside the missile for extended periods. If a decision was made to launch the missile, the liquid oxygen tank was filled and ít was raised to the surface. The launch would occur shortly after completion of this process. The exposure on the surface that this procedure entailed was the great weakness of the Atlas F. It was exposed and vulnerable during this time. Titan II and Minuteman missiles could be launched from within their silos, thereby eliminating this vulnerability. Also, since the Titan did not use a cryogenic fuel or oxidizer, and the Minuteman was a solid fuel rocket, they could be stored fully fueled and ready to launch within a few minutes.

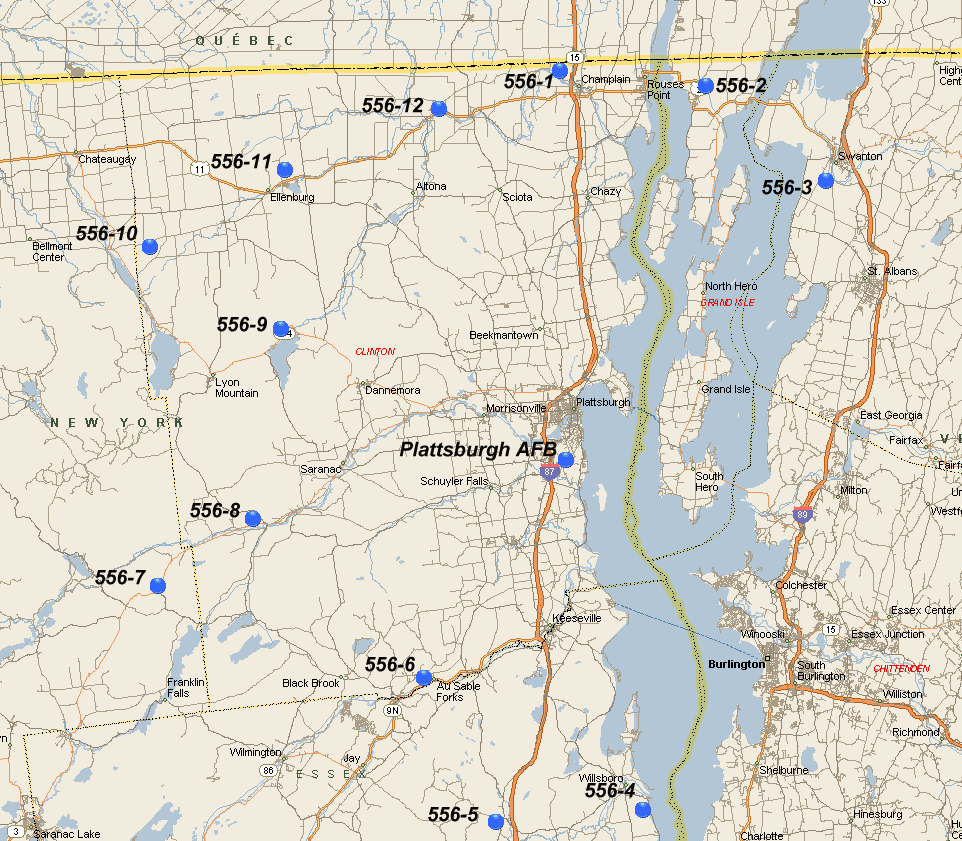
SM-65F Atlas Missile Sites

The squadron operated twelve missile sites with one missile at each site.

556–1 5.2 mi W of Rouses Point, NY 45°00′04″N 073°28′18″W
556–2 1.0 mi E of Alburg, VT 44°59′14″N 073°17′18″W
556–3 1.3 mi SSW of Swanton, VT 44°54′08″N 073°08′17″W
556–4 6.4 mi S of Willsboro Point, NY 44°20′33″N 073°22′11″W
556–5 8.2 mi NNE of Elizabethtown, NY 44°19′55″N 073°33′13″W
556–6 2.1 mi NE of Au Sable Forks, NY 44°27′36″N 073°38′33″W
556–7 4.1 mi E of Loon Lake, NY 44°32′48″N 073°58′33″W
556–8 6.6 mi WSW of Saranac, NY 44°36′04″N 073°51′24″W
556–9 5.9 mi NW of Dannemora, NY 44°46′15″N 073°49′20″W
556–10 7.3 mi SE of Chateaugay, NY 44°50′36″N 073°59′17″W
556–11 14.0 mi WNW of Ellenburg, NY 44°54′44″N 073°49′04″W
556–12 10.7 mi WNW of Mooers, NY 44°58′05″N 073°38′01″W

The first missile arrived in April 1962. During the Cuban Missile Crisis, on 20 October 1962, SAC directed that the squadron's missiles that had been received but were not yet on alert be placed on alert status "as covertly as possible." Training was suspended and missiles being used for operational training were to be placed on alert as soon as liquid oxygen became available. (Note: For safety reasons, training missiles used liquid nitrogen, rather than liquid oxygen in their propellant tanks. Kipp, et al., pp. 62-63) The squadron's training for the increased alert was greatly accelerated, but it became clear that the alert status of the unit would be degraded without additional crews. Only two squadron missiles were on alert at the beginning of the crisis, which soon increased to seven, with more missiles being brought on line and turned over to SAC. Four crews from the 577th Strategic Missile Squadron at Altus Air Force Base, Oklahoma and four from the 551st Strategic Missile Squadron at Lincoln Air Force Base, Nebraska were deployed to augment the squadron, along with an instructor crew from the 576th Strategic Missile Squadron at Vandenberg to fully train the 556th's crews and assist with maintaining its missiles.

From 3 November the number of alert missiles was reduced until on 29 November the number was the same as before the crisis. As tensions eased, on 15 November normal training resumed. On 20 December, the squadron was declared operational, completing SAC's deployment of the Atlas F missile.

Secretary of Defense Robert MacNamara had earlier directed that early model Atlas missiles be removed from the nuclear deterrent force. In November 1964, he announced that the Atlas F would also be phased out by the end of June 1965 in Project Added Effort. As the phase out progressed, the squadron became nonoperational on 1 May and was inactivated on 25 June 1965.

== Lineage ==
- Constituted as the 556 Bombardment Squadron (Medium) on 25 November 1942

Activated on 1 December 1942
Redesignated 556 Bombardment Squadron, Medium on 9 October 1944
Inactivated on 12 November 1945

- Redesignated 556th Strategic Missile Squadron on 22 November 1957

Activated on 15 December 1957

- Redesignated 556th Strategic Missile Squadron (ICM-Snark) on 1 April 1958

Inactivated on 16 July 1959

- Redesignated 556th Strategic Missile Squadron (ICBM-Atlas) and activated on 26 April 1961 (not organized)

Organized on 1 October 1961
Inactivated on 25 June 1965

=== Assignments ===
- 387th Bombardment Group, 1 December 1942 – 12 November 1945
- Strategic Air Command, 15 December 1957
- 702d Strategic Missile Wing, 1 April–16 July 1959
- Strategic Air Command, 26 April 1961 (not organized)
- 820th Air Division (later 820th Strategic Aerospace Division), 1 October 1961
- 380th Strategic Aerospace Wing, 15 September 1964 – 25 June 1965

=== Stations ===
- MacDill Field, Florida, 1 December 1942
- Drane Field, Florida, 12 April 1943
- Godman Field, Kentucky, 12 May-10 Jun 1943
- RAF Chipping Ongar (AAF-162), England, 1 July 1943
- RAF Stoney Cross (AAF-452), England, c. 21 July 1944
- Maupertuis Airfield (A-15), France, c. 1 September 1944
- Chateaudun Airfield (A-39), France, c. 18 September 1944
- Clastres Airfield (A-71), France, c. 4 November 1944
- Maastricht Airfield (Y-44), Netherlands, c. 4 May 1945
- Rosieres-en-Santerre Airfield (B-87), France, 30 May-c. Nov 1945
- Camp Kilmer, New Jersey, 11–12 Nov 1945
- Patrick Air Force Base, Florida, 15 December 1957
- Presque Isle Air Force Base, Maine, 9–16 Jul 1959
- Plattsburgh Air Force Base, New York, 1 October 1961 – 25 June 1965

=== Aircraft and missiles ===
- Martin B-26 Marauder, 1942–1945
- Northrop SM-62 Snark, 1958–1959
- General Dynamics SM-65F (later HGM-16F) Atlas, 1962–1964

=== Awards and campaigns ===
| Award streamer | Award | Dates | Notes |
|---|---|---|---|
| | Presidential Unit Citation | Germany 23 December 1944 | 556th Bombardment Squadron |

| Campaign Streamer | Campaign | Dates | Notes |
|---|---|---|---|
| | Air Offensive, Europe | 1 July 1943 – 5 June 1944 | 556th Bombardment Squadron |
| | Normandy | 6 June 1944 – 24 July 1944 | 556th Bombardment Squadron |
| | Northern France | 25 July 1944 – 14 September 1944 | 556th Bombardment Squadron |
| | Rhineland | 15 September 1944 – 21 March 1945 | 556th Bombardment Squadron |
| | Ardennes-Alsace | 16 December 1944 – 25 January 1945 | 556th Bombardment Squadron |
| | Central Europe | 22 March 1944 – 21 May 1945 | 556th Bombardment Squadron |

== See also ==
- List of United States Air Force missile squadrons
- List of Martin B-26 Marauder operators
