= 820th Strategic Aerospace Division =

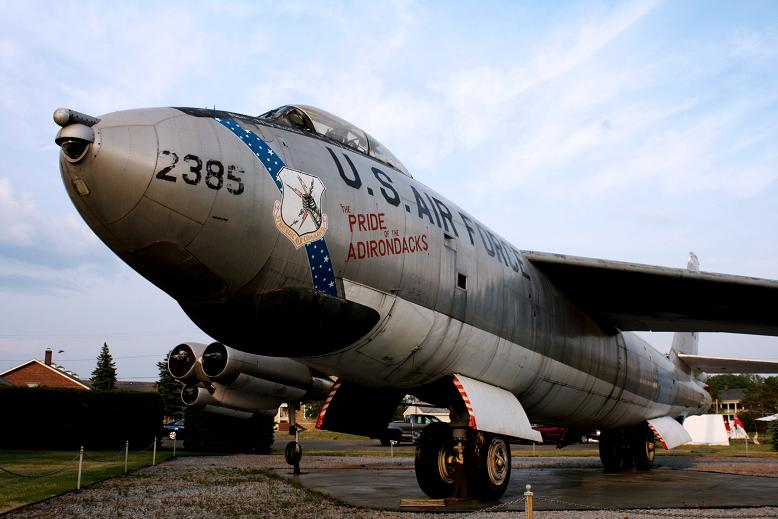
- B-47 Stratojet, on display in Plattsburgh, NY, with markings of the 380th Bombardment Wing
- Active: 1956–1965
- Country: United States
- Branch: United States Air Force
- Role: Command and Control

Commanders
- Notable commanders: Lt Gen Alvan Cullem Gillem II

Insignia
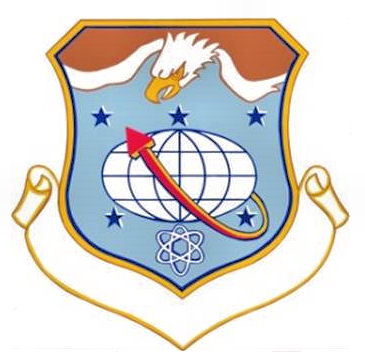
- 820th Strategic Aerospace Division emblem (Note: Approved 14 December 1962. Description: Light blue, in nombril an ellipsoid argent gridlined azure, surmounted by an arrow bendwise in dexter fess trailing a vapor stream orbiting bendwise both gules and or, all between five mullets fesswise three and two of the third [color mentioned], in base an atomic symbol of the second [color mentioned], issuant from chief a demi eagle proper, all within a diminished bordure of the fifth [color mentioned] fimbriated of the third [color mentioned].)

The 820th Strategic Aerospace Division is an inactive United States Air Force organization. Its last assignment was with Strategic Air Command (SAC)'s Eighth Air Force at Plattsburgh Air Force Base, New York, where it was inactivated on 25 June 1965.

The division was activated as the 820th Air Division in 1956 to command the two Boeing B-47 Stratojet wings planned for Plattsburgh. However, the arrival of the second wing was delayed, and in 1959 the 820th was assigned two SAC Boeing B-52 Stratofortress strategic wings and air refueling wings at bases in New York and Maine. Although the second bombardment wing finally arrived at Plattsburgh, it remained a paper unit until it was inactivated.

By 1961, the division had returned to commanding the bombardment and refueling wings at Plattsburgh and managing support units there. It added SM-65 Atlas intercontinental ballistic missiles and EB-47 Stratojets of the Post Attack Command and Control System within the next year. The missiles brought with them a new name for the division, the 820th Strategic Aerospace Division.

However, by 1964 the division was reduced to commanding a single wing at Plattsburgh and an air refueling squadron in Delaware. When the Delaware squadron moved to Oklahoma and was reassigned in June 1965, the division was inactivated.

== History ==
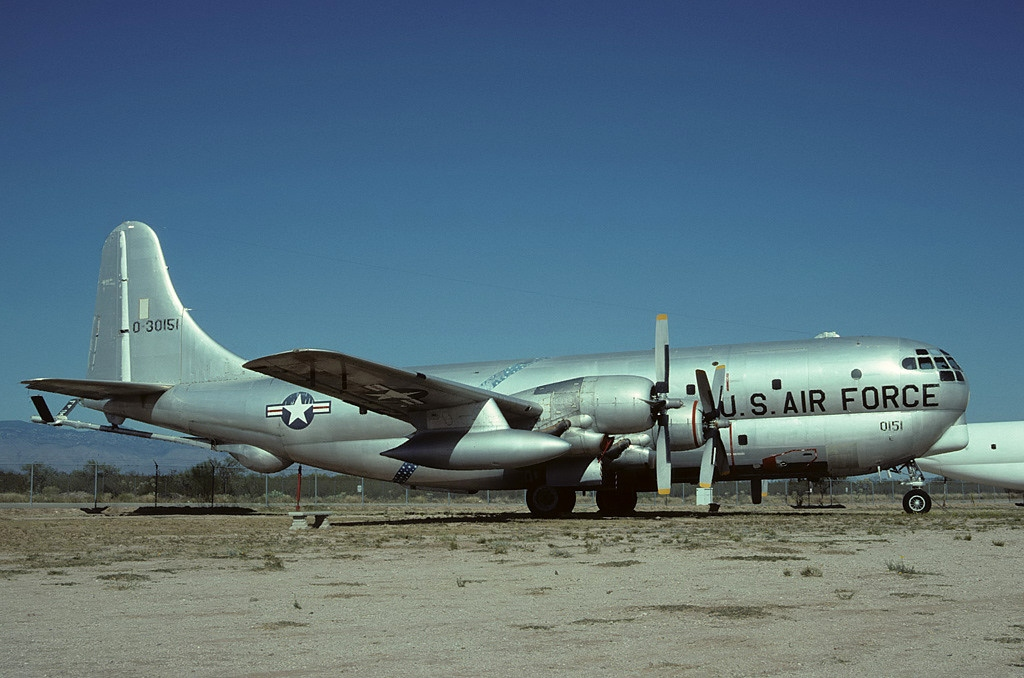
Boeing KC-97G Stratofreighter

The 820th Air Division was activated By Strategic Air Command (SAC) at Plattsburgh Air Force Base, New York in January 1956 as the command headquarters for Plattsburgh in anticipation of the movement of a second Boeing B-47 Stratojet wing to Plattsburgh. In June, its 820th Air Base Group became the host organization for Plattsburgh, taking over from the 380th Air Base Group, which had acted in that capacity since 1955. The 380th Bombardment Wing, which had activated at Plattsburgh in the summer of 1955, was the first combat wing assigned to the division. While awaiting the completion of facilities at Plattsburgh, the 380th Wing had been training with B-47s at Pinecastle Air Force Base, Florida. In late June 1956, the wing's initial training was complete and its operational units returned to Plattsburgh Full B-47 operations began the following month. However, the arrival of the second B-47 wing was delayed, and the 380th remained the division's only wing until 1959. (Note: The 97th Bombardment Wing was to move to Plattsburgh from Biggs Air Force Base, Texas, but its move was cancelled in November 1958 because of inadequate housing in the Plattsburgh area. "Abstract (Unclassified), History 820 Air Division Nov 1958 (Secret)". Air Force History Index..) From October through November 1956, the wing was placed on a higher state of readiness because of the Suez Crisis and the Hungarian revolution.

Although the second wing's arrival was delayed, in August 1957, the 26th Air Refueling Squadron moved to Plattsburgh from Westover Air Force Base, Massachusetts and was assigned to the division, although it was attached to the 380th Wing for operations. In August 1959, the 26th was assigned directly to the 380th Wing.

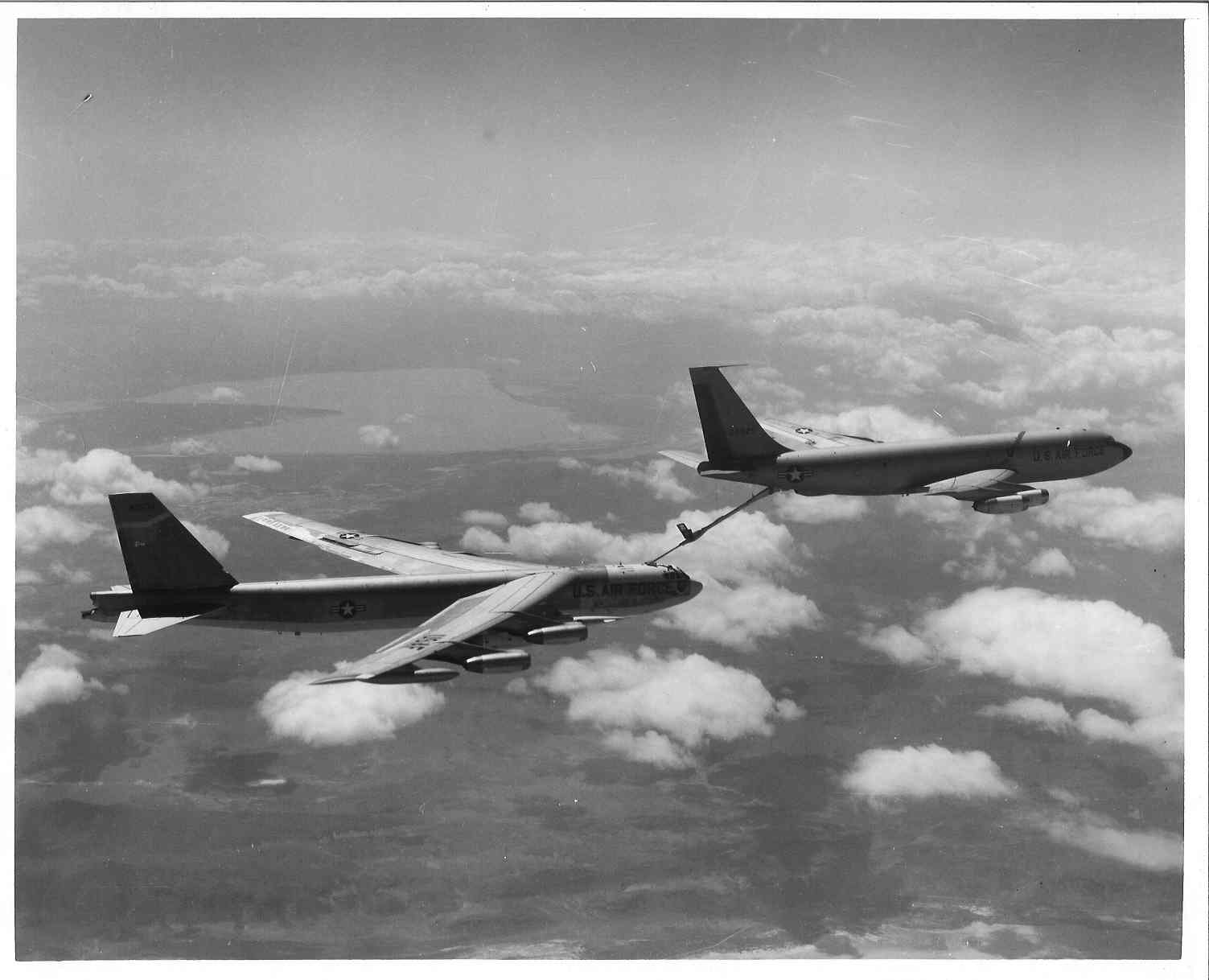
B-52G refueling from a KC-135A

In January 1959, the 820th grew by three wings. It added two Strategic Wings, the 4038th at Dow Air Force Base, Maine and the 4039th at Griffiss Air Force Base, New York. These wings had been established by SAC in a program to disperse its Boeing B-52 Stratofortress bombers over a larger number of bases, thus making it more difficult for the Soviet Union to knock out the entire fleet with a surprise first strike. SAC bases with large concentrations of bombers made attractive targets. SAC's response was to break up its wings and scatter their aircraft over a larger number of bases. The division was also assigned a second wing at Dow, the 4060th Air Refueling Wing. From 1959 until 1961, the division had over 200 combat aircraft assigned to it.

Six months later, in July 1959, the second Plattsburgh wing finally arrived when the 308th Bombardment Wing moved without personnel or equipment from Hunter Air Force Base, Georgia. The 308th remained a paper unit, however, for until June 1960 the 380th Wing tested a "super wing" concept with over 110 operational aircraft assigned, while the 308th Wing remained non-operational until it was finally inactivated in June 1961.

In January 1960, the division became an operational headquarters only, when the 380th Bombardment Wing's 380th Combat Support Group again assumed support duties at Plattsburgh. The number of wings assigned to the division was reduced by one in February, when the 4060th Air Refueling Wing was discontinued and its units assigned to the 4038th Strategic Wing.

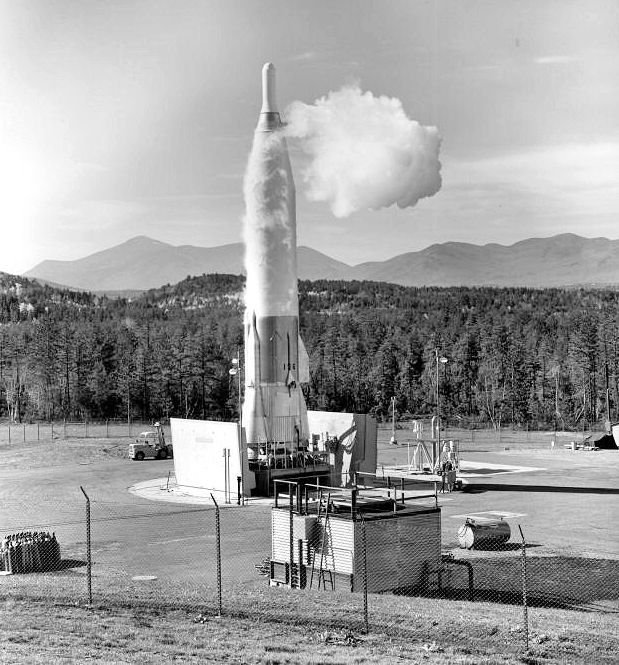
Convair SM-65F Atlas of the 556th Strategic Missile Squadron (Note: Photo taken at Site 6. Au Sable Forks, New York.)

In addition to the inactivation of the 308th Wing, 1961 was a year of other changes to the division's responsibilities. In January, the refueling squadrons at Plattsburgh were organized into the 4108th Air Refueling Wing, which was assigned to the division. In April, the two B-52 strategic wings were reassigned to the 6th Air Division. The division's wings now were located at Plattsburgh, and for the second time the 820th Combat Support Group replaced the 380th as the division resumed responsibility for support duties at the base. In October, the division added another weapons system, the SM-65 Atlas intercontinental ballistic missile, as the 556th Strategic Missile Squadron was activated and assigned to the division.

In the following year, SAC added the term "aerospace" to the names of its divisions that controlled both bomber and missile strike forces and the 820th became the 820th Strategic Aerospace Division. Another name change occurred to one of the division's wings because SAC became concerned that its Major Command Controlled (MAJCON) units, like the 4108th Wing, could not carry a permanent history or lineage. and SAC looked for a way to make its these wings permanent. Later that year, in order to perpetuate the lineage of many currently inactive bombardment units with illustrious World War II records, SAC received authority from USAF to discontinue its MAJCON wings that were equipped with combat aircraft and to activate Air Force controlled (AFCON) units, most of which were inactive at the time which could carry a lineage and history. As a result, the 4108th Wing was replaced by the newly constituted 497th Air Refueling Wing, which assumed its mission, personnel, and equipment on 1 January 1963. (Note: Although the 497th Wing was a new organization, it continued, through temporary bestowal, the history, and honors of the World War II 497th Bombardment Group. It was also entitled to retain the honors (but not the history or lineage) of the 4108th Air Refueling Wing. This temporary bestowal ended in January 1984, when the wing and group were consolidated into a single unit. See Ravenstein, Combat Wings, Appendix V, USAF Bestowed History.)

In July 1962, the 4365 Post Attack Command Control Squadron, flying EB-47 Stratojets of the Post Attack Command and Control System was activated and assigned to the division, although it was attached to the 380th Wing. The squadron operated its communications relay aircraft until September 1964, when it ceased operations and was then inactivated in December. Later that year, beginning on 23 October, in response to the Cuban Missile Crisis, the aircraft and missiles of the division assumed a heightened alert state. A portion of its bombers dispersed to other airfields, returning to Plattsburgh one month later.

On 1 July 1964, 499th Air Refueling Wing at Westover Air Force Base, which had been responsible for Boeing KC-97 Stratofreighter air refueling squadrons at a number of northeastern bases transferred the squadrons not located at Westover to other units. As a result of this transfer, the 11th Air Refueling Squadron at Dover Air Force Base, Delaware became part of the division. Three months later, the 497th Air Refueling Wing at Plattsburgh, whose squadrons had become nonoperational starting in July, was also inactivated, and with a single wing remaining at Plattsburgh, the division terminated its support responsibilities at Plattsburgh.

As the KC-97 force was reduced, operations at Dover ended and the 11th squadron moved on paper to Altus Air Force Base, Oklahoma in June 1965, where it replaced the 96th Air Refueling Squadron, whose mission, personnel and aircraft it assumed. With no units left other than the 380th Wing at Plattsburgh, the division was simultaneously inactivated.

== Lineage ==
- Established as 820 Air Division on 24 January 1956

Activated on 1 February 1956
Redesignated 820 Strategic Aerospace Division on 1 May 1962
Discontinued and inactivated, on 25 June 1965

=== Assignments ===
- Eighth Air Force, 1 February 1956 – 25 June 1965

=== Stations ===
- Plattsburgh Air Force Base, New York, 1 February 1956 – 25 June 1965

=== Components ===
Wings

- 308th Bombardment Wing: 15 July 1959 – 25 June 1961
- 380th Bombardment Wing (later 380 Strategic Aerospace Wing): 1 February 1956 – 25 June 1965 (attached to 7th Air Division, 3 April 1957 – 3 July 1957)
- 497th Air Refueling Wing: 1 January 1963 – 15 September 1964
- 4038th Strategic Wing: 1 January 1959 – 1 April 1961

Dow Air Force Base, Maine

- 4039th Strategic Wing: 5 January 1959 – 1 April 1961

Griffiss Air Force Base, New York

- 4060th Air Refueling Wing: 1 January 1959 – 1 February 1960

Dow Air Force Base, Maine

- 4108th Air Refueling Wing: 1 January 1961 – 1 January 1963

Groups

- 820th Air Base Group (later 820th Combat Support Group): 1 June 1956 – 1 January 1960, 1 April 1961 – 15 September 1964
- 820th Medical Group: 1 May 1959 1 January 1960, 1 April 1961 – 15 September 1964

Squadrons

- 11th Air Refueling Squadron: 1 July 1964 – 25 June 1965
- 26th Air Refueling Squadron: 7 August 1957 – 1 August 1959 (attached to 380th Bombardment Wing)
- 556th Strategic Missile Squadron: 1 October 1961 – 15 September 1964
- 4365th Support Squadron (later 4365 Post Attack Command Control Squadron): 20 July 1962 – 24 December 1964 (attached to 380th Bombardment Wing)

Other

- 4020th USAF Hospital: 1 June 1956 – 1 May 1959

=== Aircraft and Missiles ===
- Boeing B-47 Stratojet, 1956–1965
- Boeing EB-47 Stratojet, 1962–1964
- Boeing KC-97 Stratofreighter, 1956–1965
- Boeing KC-135 Stratotanker, 1969–1961; 1964–1965
- Boeing B-52 Stratofortress, 1960–1961
- Convair SM-65 (later CGM-16) Atlas, 1961–1965

=== Commanders ===
- Brig Gen Kenneth O. Sanborn, 23 Feb 1956
- Brig Gen James W. Wilson, 24 Mar 1958
- Col John B. Paine, 22 Jun 1959 (Interim)
- Brig Gen Perry M. Hoisington II, 27 Jul 1959
- Brig Gen Alvan C. Gillem II, 1 Apr 1961
- Brig Gen Winton R. Close, 15 Sep 1961
- Col Richard R. Stewart, by 31 Oct 1963 – 25 Jun 1965

== See also ==
- List of United States Air Force air divisions
- List of MAJCOM wings of the United States Air Force
- List of USAF Bomb Wings and Wings assigned to Strategic Air Command
- List of USAF Strategic Wings assigned to the Strategic Air Command
- List of B-47 units of the United States Air Force
- List of B-52 Units of the United States Air Force
