= XIII Corps (United States) =

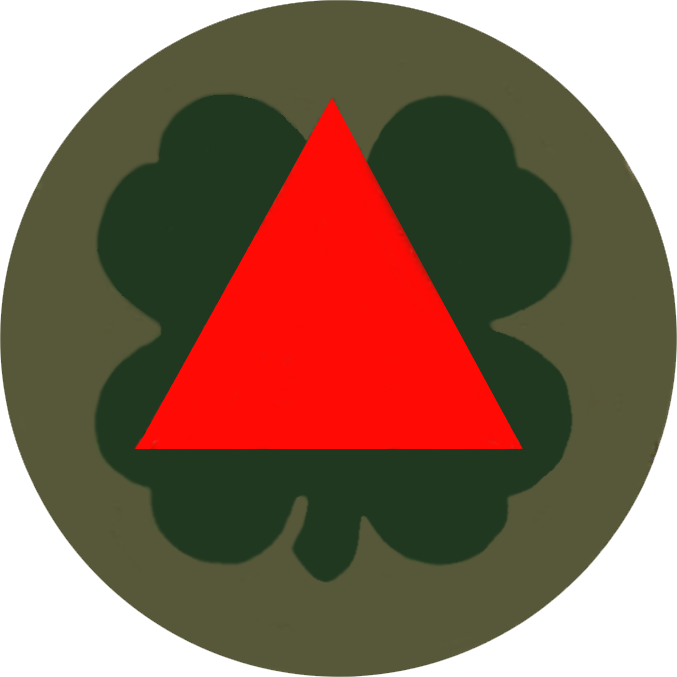
- Shoulder sleeve insignia of XIII Corps
- Active: 29 July 1921–19 July 1929; 1 October 1933–25 September 1945; 16 December 1957–5 June 1970
- Country: United States of America
- Branch: United States Army
- Role: Headquarters
- Size: Corps
- Engagements: World War II; Rhineland; Central Europe

Commanders
- Notable commanders: Emil F. Reinhardt; Alvan Cullom Gillem, Jr. Benjamin F. Evans Jr. Charles S. O'Malley Jr. Kelley B. Lemmon Jr.

Insignia
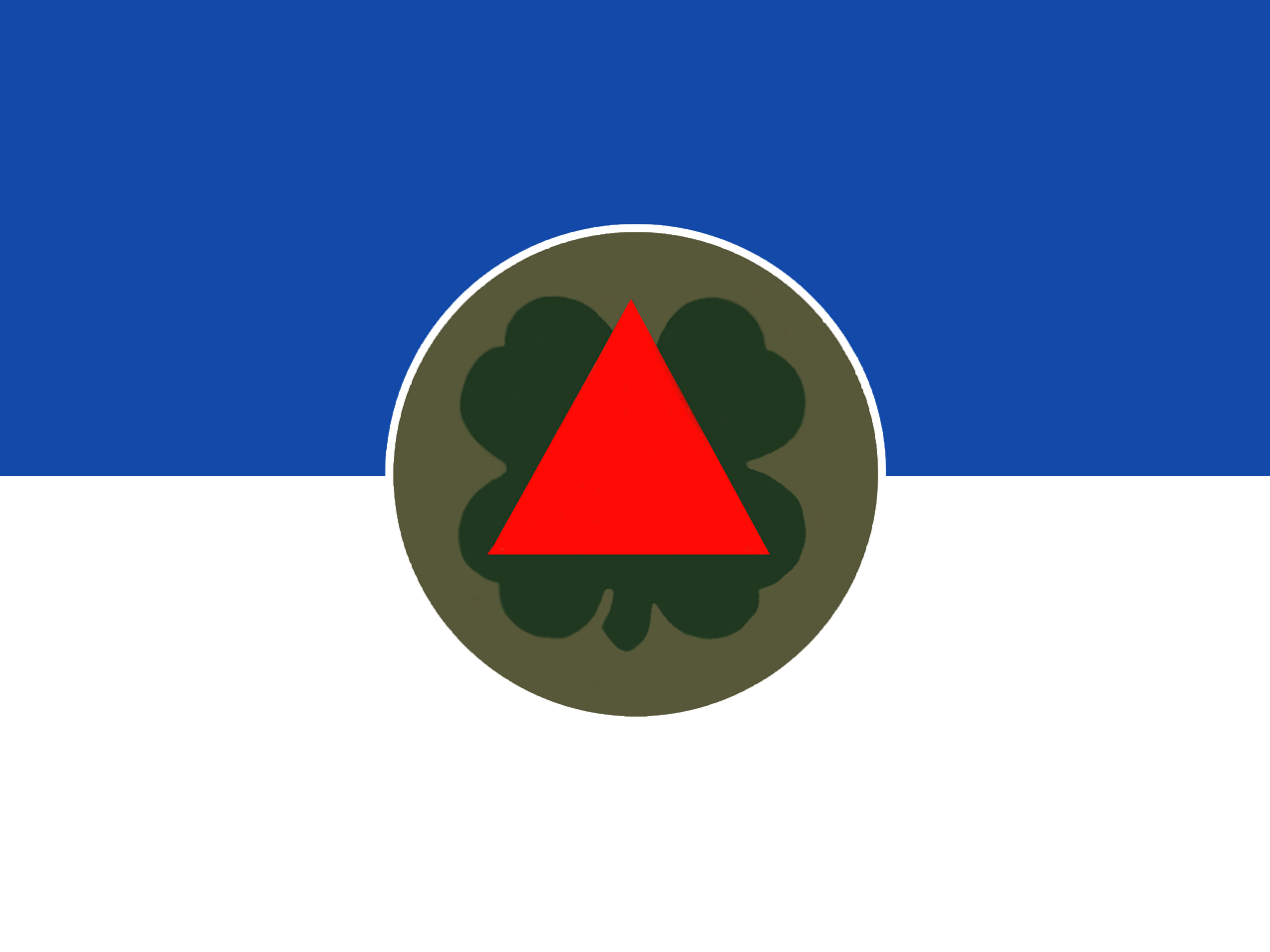
- XIII Corps Flag

== History ==
=== Interwar period ===
==== XIII Corps (I) ====
The XIII Corps was authorized by the National Defense Act of 1920, and was to be composed of units of the Organized Reserve located primarily in the Third Corps Area. The Headquarters and Headquarters Company were constituted on 29 July 1921 in the Regular Army, allotted to the Third Corps Area, and assigned to the Fourth Army. The Headquarters was organized about November 1921 with Reserve personnel at Fort Howard, Maryland. The Headquarters Company was organized with Reserve personnel in February 1923 at York, Pennsylvania. Though there seems to be no definitive information available, the corps headquarters appears to have been inactivated sometime in 1925. The Headquarters Company was inactivated on 19 July 1929 at Fort Howard. The Headquarters was withdrawn from the Regular Army on 1 October 1933 and demobilized.

==== XIII Corps (II) ====
The second iteration of the XIII Corps was constituted in the Organized Reserve on 1 October 1933, allotted to the Third Corps Area, and assigned to the First Army. This new corps’ designated headquarters location for organization purposes was Fort Howard. In the event of mobilization, it was to be organized with Regular Army officers from the Third Corps Area and with Reserve personnel already assigned to the corps headquarters and headquarters company in peacetime. The designated mobilization station was Camp George G. Meade, Maryland, where the corps headquarters would assume command and control of its subordinate corps troops, which would then be mobilizing throughout the Third Corps Area. It was redesignated on 1 January 1941 as Headquarters, XIII Army Corps. The XIII Corps was not initiated nor activated prior to World War II.

=== World War II ===
The XIII Corps was activated on 7 December 1942 at Providence, Rhode Island, the XIII Corps fought for 180 days in the European Theater of Operations, from the Netherlands to the Elbe River. It was first activated under the command of then-Major General Emil F. Reinhardt, but would be commanded in combat by Major General (later Lieutenant General) Alvan C. Gillem, Jr. as a subordinate unit to Ninth U.S. Army, it under the command of the Allied 21st Army Group. In November 1944, the XIII Corps pierced the Siegfried Line and pushed to the Roer River. On 23 February 1945, the corps routed Third Reich forces in the Cologne Plain and made a dash for the Rhine on 31 March of that year. In 180 days of combat, the corps had progressed as far as the Elbe River to the vicinity of Tangermunde, bringing it to approximately 50 miles from Berlin, the closest American forces would come to the enemy capital before V-E Day.

In total, the corps fought across more than 300 miles of enemy territory and captured more than 247,000 prisoners, as well as taking key cities, such as Viersen, Krefeld, Moers, Homburg, Münster, and Hannover. In the month following V-E Day, units from the corps were redeployed. Corps headquarters would eventually find its way to Camp Cooke, California, where on 25 September 1945, XIII Corps was inactivated.

The corps was subsequently active as part of the Regular Army from 1958 until 1970 at Fort Devens, Massachusetts. In 1961 it was controlling all reserve activities in the six New England states, under the command of Maj. Gen. William J. Verbeck. During an extended callup of reservists in December 1961 reservists had a variety of complaints.

==== Order of battle ====
During operations in Europe the corps major units included:

- the 84th, 102nd, 29th and 35th infantry divisions
- the 5th Armored Division
- the 17th Airborne Division
- the 11th Cavalry Group
- the 19th Anti-aircraft Artillery Group.
- Corps Field Artillery Groups included the 196th, the 202nd, the 411th, the 422nd or the 472nd with the 2d, 70th, 83rd armored, 252nd, 280th, 349th, 695th armored, 753rd, 754th, 755th, 774th, 777th, 787th and 808th artillery battalions.

Other units included: the 3rd and 92nd Chemical Mortar Battalions, 226th Searchlight Battalion, the 135th AAA Gun Battalion, the 556th AAA Automatic Weapons Battalion, the 125th Liaison Squadron (flying Cubs and L-5s), 21st Weather Squadron, 40th Mobile Communications Squadron, 669th Engineer Topographical Company (Corps), 3258th Signal Services Company, 232nd Army Postal Unit, 213th Counter-intelligence Corps Detachment, the 167th and 168th Signal Photo Companies, 1st platoon/278th Signal Pigeon Company, the 184th Medical Battalion (with the 446th and 448th Medical Collecting Companies and the 625th Medical Clearing Company), 822nd Military Police Company, the 80th Quartermaster Battalion (663rd and 648th Quartermaster Truck Companies), the 866th Quartermaster Fumigation and Bath Company, the 102nd, 103rd and 104th Interrogation of Prisoners of War teams, the 457th and 458th Military Intelligence Interpreters teams, the 46th Order of Battle team and the 70th and 101st Photo Interpretation teams.

The corps officially met with the Soviet troops in Gartow where General Gillem met with Lieutenant General Oslikowski of the 3rd Cavalry Corps of the Red Army.

== Commanders ==
- Major General Emil F. Reinhardt (7 December 1942 – December 1943)
- Major General Alvan Cullom Gillem, Jr. (2 December 1943 – August 1945)

=== Artillery commanders ===
- Brigadier general Theodore L. Futch (December 1942 – 1944)
- Brigadier general Frank Camm
- Brigadier general John H. Hinds
- Brigadier general Abram F. Kibler
