= Ernest Hinds =

U.S. Army major general

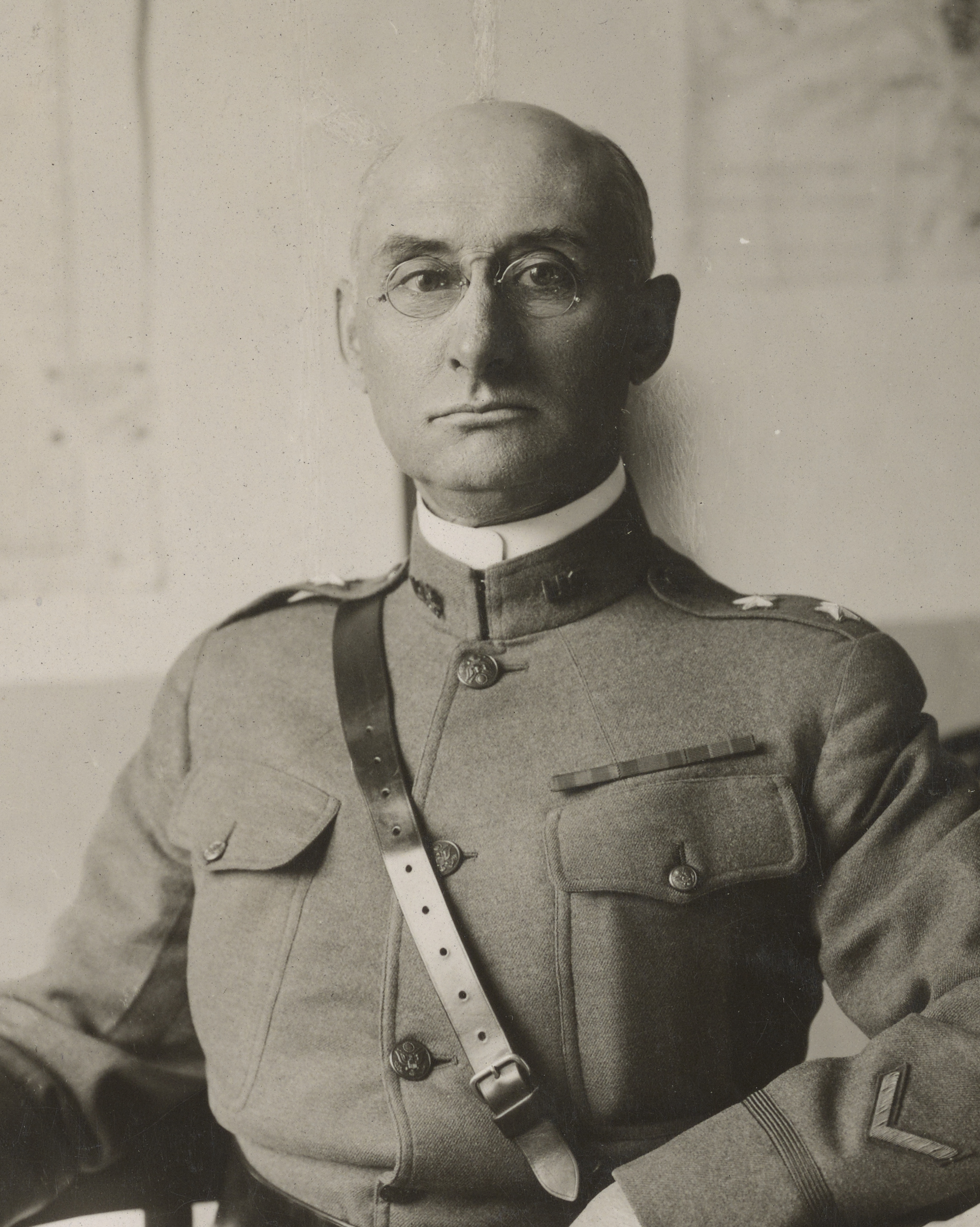
- National Archives photo of Hinds as a major general in 1918
- Born: August 18, 1864; Red Hill, Alabama, C.S.
- Died: June 17, 1941 (aged 76); San Antonio, Texas, U.S.
- Burial place: Fort Sam Houston National Cemetery
- Spouse: Minerva "Minnie" Hatton Miller (m. 1889–1941, his death)
- Children: 2
- Relatives: Alfred Walton Hinds (brother)
- Military career
- Allegiance: United States
- Branch: United States Army
- Service years: 1887–1928
- Rank: Major General
- Unit: U.S. Army Field Artillery Branch
- Commands: Light Battery F, 2nd Field Artillery Regiment; Battery L, 2nd Field Artillery; 2nd Field Artillery Battery; American Expeditionary Forces Artillery School; I Corps Artillery; Chief of Artillery, American Expeditionary Forces; United States Army Field Artillery School; 2nd Division; Eighth Corps Area
- Conflicts: Spanish–American War; Philippine–American War; World War I
- Awards: Army Distinguished Service Medal; Order of Leopold II (Commander) (Belgium); Legion of Honor (Commander) (France); Croix de Guerre with Palm (France); Order of Saints Maurice and Lazarus (Commander) (Italy)
- Other work: Secretary-treasurer and general manager, United Services Automobile Association (USAA)

Ernest Hinds (August 18, 1864 – June 17, 1941) was a career officer in the United States Army. A veteran of the Spanish–American War, Philippine–American War, and World War I, he attained the rank of major general and was notable for his service as Chief of Artillery for the American Expeditionary Forces during the First World War and his post war command of the 2nd Division and United States Army Field Artillery School.

== Early life ==
Ernest Hinds was born in Red Hill, Alabama on August 18, 1864, the son of Margaret Rebecca (Pickett) Hinds and Byram Wilborn Hinds, a physician and Confederate States Army veteran of the American Civil War. Among his siblings was Alfred Walton Hinds, a United States Navy officer who served as Naval Governor of Guam. Hinds attended the local schools of Marshall County until his father moved the family to New Hope, Alabama in Madison County. After completing high school, in 1883 Hinds competed for a Congressional appointment to the United States Military Academy. He attained the highest score on the qualifying exam and received the appointment from Joseph Wheeler.

Hinds attended West Point from 1883 to 1887. He graduated in June 1887 ranked 8th of 64. Hinds received his commission as a second lieutenant of Field Artillery and was assigned to the 2nd Field Artillery Regiment.

Among Hind's classmates who also became general officers were Frank Herman Albright, Marcus Daniel Cronin, Alexander Lucian Dade, James Theodore Dean, Charles S. Farnsworth, George Washington Gatchell, Charles Gerhardt, Herman Hall, Thomas Grafton Hanson, Mark L. Hersey, Michael Joseph Lenihan, Ulysses G. McAlexander, Nathaniel Fish McClure, William C. Rivers, George Owen Squier, Charles Brewster Wheeler, and Edmund Wittenmyer.

== Start of career ==
After receiving his commission, Hinds served with his regiment at Little Rock Barracks, Arkansas until December 1888. He was then posted to Jackson Barracks, Louisiana, where he remained until May 1889. Hinds was assigned to Fort Preble, Maine until March 1892. He served with the 2nd Field Artillery's Light Battery A at Fort Riley, Kansas from March 1892 to October 1895. He received his promotion to first lieutenant in July 1893.

From October 1895 to August 1896, Hinds served with Light Battery A at Fort Schuyler, New York. From September 1896 to April 1898, he was a student in the Artillery Officers' Course at the Fort Monroe, Virginia Artillery School. He completed the course as an Honor Graduate.

== Spanish–American War ==
During the Spanish–American War, Hinds commanded Light Battery F, 2nd Field Artillery. He participated in the Santiago campaign from July to November 1898. He continued in command during the post-war occupation, and in August and September 1899 he commanded Battery L, 2nd Field Artillery, which performed duty at Reina Battery, Havana.

In September 1899, Hinds was promoted to temporary major in the 49th U. S. Volunteer Infantry, a temporary unit created for duty during the Philippine–American War. He served with this regiment in the Philippines from January 1900 until June 1901. In February 1901, Hinds was promoted to permanent captain.

== Continued career ==
After returning from the Philippines, Hinds reverted to his permanent captain's rank. From August 1901 to December 1903 he commanded the 2nd Field Artillery Battery at Fort Sam Houston, Texas. From December 1903 to December 1905 he served on the Field Artillery Drill Regulations Board at the War Department in Washington, D.C. From January 1906 to March 1907, he commanded the 2nd Battery at Fort Riley, Kansas. He was promoted to major in January 1907.

In April 1907, Hinds was assigned as adjutant of the Department of Colorado, based in Denver. When the Army separated the Artillery branch into Field Artillery and Coast Artillery in May 1907, Hinds was assigned to the Field Artillery.

Hinds was acting adjutant of the Department of Texas in San Antonio from June to September 1907. From September 1907 to June 1909 he was adjutant of the post at Fort Riley. In August and September 1908 he served as adjutant of the Camp of Instruction and Maneuver which took place at Fort Riley. In August 1909 Hinds was assigned as assistant adjutant of the Philippine Division with duty in Manila, and he remained at this post until April 1911.

Upon his return to the United States, Hinds was assigned to the 6th Field Artillery and he served with this regiment until November 1911. In November he began attendance at the Fort Sill, Oklahoma School of Fire for Field Artillery, and he completed the Field Officers' Course on December 15. On December 1 he was promoted to lieutenant colonel in the 5th Field Artillery. Hinds served with the 5th Field Artillery at Fort Sill from December 1911 to September 1914.

While assigned to the 5th Field Artillery, Hinds also carried out several temporary assignments. From April to May 1912 he attended the Field Officer's Course at the Fort Riley Mounted Service School. In August 1912, he commanded the field artillery of the Red Division during the Army's Connecticut Maneuvers. From September to November 1913, he was president of the Board on Competitive Tests of Automatic Machine Guns. From January to March 1914, he attended the Field Officers' Course at the Fort Leavenworth, Kansas Army Service Schools. From December 1914 to July 1917, Hinds was assigned as chief of staff of the Philippines Department. He was promoted to colonel on July 1, 1916. As chief of staff, Hinds was a member of several boards and commissions, including the Board of Defense of the Philippine Islands and the Army and Navy Board on Plans for Cooperation in Defense of the Philippines.

== World War I ==
In August 1917, some four months after the American entry into World War I, Hinds was promoted to temporary brigadier general and assigned to command the American Expeditionary Forces (AEF) Artillery School in Saumur, France. He served as commandant from December 1917 to January 1918. From January to March 1918, Hinds commanded I Corps Artillery. In April 1918, he was promoted to temporary major general and assigned as the AEF's Chief of Artillery. He served until the end of the war in November 1918, then remained in Germany as part of the post-war occupation until June 1919.

Hinds was commended for his organization and training of the AEF's field artillery, and his accomplishments were recognized with several awards, including: the Army Distinguished Service Medal; Belgium's Order of Leopold II (Commander); France's Legion of Honor (Commander); the French Croix de Guerre with Palm; and Italy's Order of Saints Maurice and Lazarus (Commander). The citation for his Army DSM reads:

The President of the United States of America, authorized by Act of Congress, July 9, 1918, takes pleasure in presenting the Army Distinguished Service Medal to Major General Ernest Hinds, United States Army, for exceptionally meritorious and distinguished services to the Government of the United States, in a duty of great responsibility during World War I. As Chief of Artillery, 1st Army Corps, commanding General, Army Artillery of the 1st American Army, and as Chief of Artillery, American Expeditionary Forces, General Hinds perfected and successfully directed the organization and training of the Artillery of the American Army in France.

== Post-World War I ==
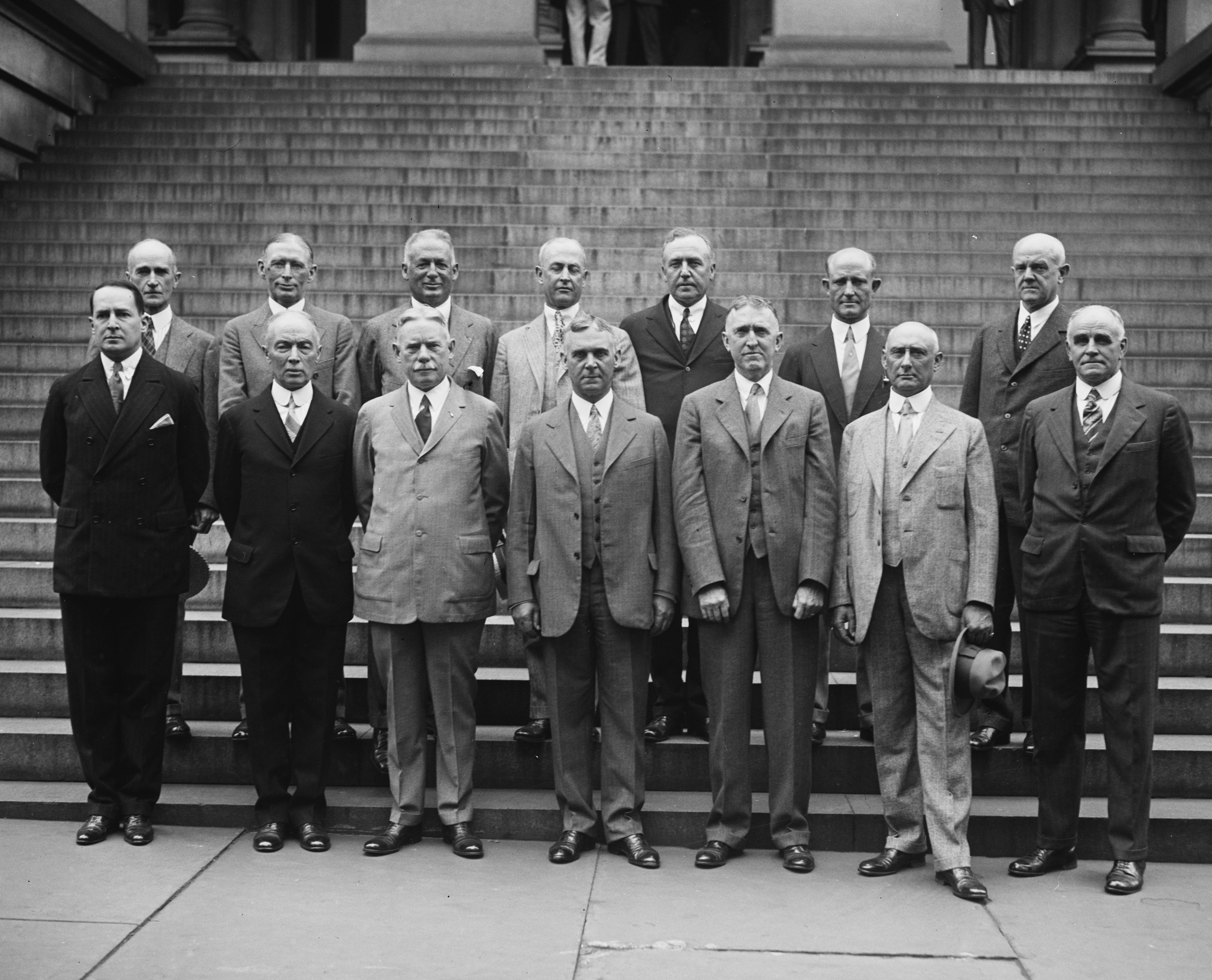
Corps area commanders and division commanders meet with the army chief of staff, Major General Charles Pelot Summerall, at the War Department, May 1927. Stood in the front row, second from the right, is Major General Ernest Hinds, commanding the Eighth Corps Area.

Following the First World War, Hinds returned to the United States and performed special duty at the War Department from July to October 1919. From October 1919 to July 1923, he served as commandant of the Field Artillery School at Fort Sill. He returned to his permanent rank of colonel in March 1920, and received promotion to permanent brigadier general the following July. While serving as commandant, Hinds also served from June to July 1922 as a member of the Board of General Officers for the Reduction of the Commissioned Strength of the Army. He was promoted to permanent major general in December 1922.

Hinds commanded the 2nd Division at Fort Sam Houston from July 1923 to January 1925. He acted as commander of the Eighth Corps Area at Fort Sam Houston from April to October 1924. From January 1925 to January 1928, Hinds was assigned as permanent commander of the Eighth Corps Area. Hinds was on leave pending retirement from January to April 1928, and he retired at his own request on April 3, a few months before reaching the mandatory retirement age of 64.

== Retirement and death ==
After retiring from the military, Hinds remained in San Antonio. He served as secretary-treasurer and general manager of the United Services Automobile Association (USAA). In 1934, he was appointed to the board of directors of the South Texas National Bank.

Hinds died in San Antonio on June 17, 1941. He was buried at Fort Sam Houston National Cemetery.

== Family ==
In 1889, Hinds married Minerva "Minnie" Hatton Miller (1869–1960) in Little Rock, Arkansas. They were the parents of two children, Marjorie Hamilton (1891–1986) and John Hamilton (1898–1993). Marjorie Hinds was the wife of Colonel Fred Taylor Cruse, the son of Brigadier General Thomas Cruse. John Hinds graduated from West Point in 1918, was a veteran of World War I, World War II, and the Korean War, and retired as a major general.

== Legacy ==
A World War II-era U.S. Army medical ship, USAT Ernest Hinds, was named in Hinds' honor.

Military offices
| Preceded by Edward Terence Donnelly | Commandant of the United States Army Field Artillery School; 1919–1923 | Succeeded by George LeRoy Irwin |
