= Alvan Cullom Gillem Jr. =

United States Army general (1888–1973)

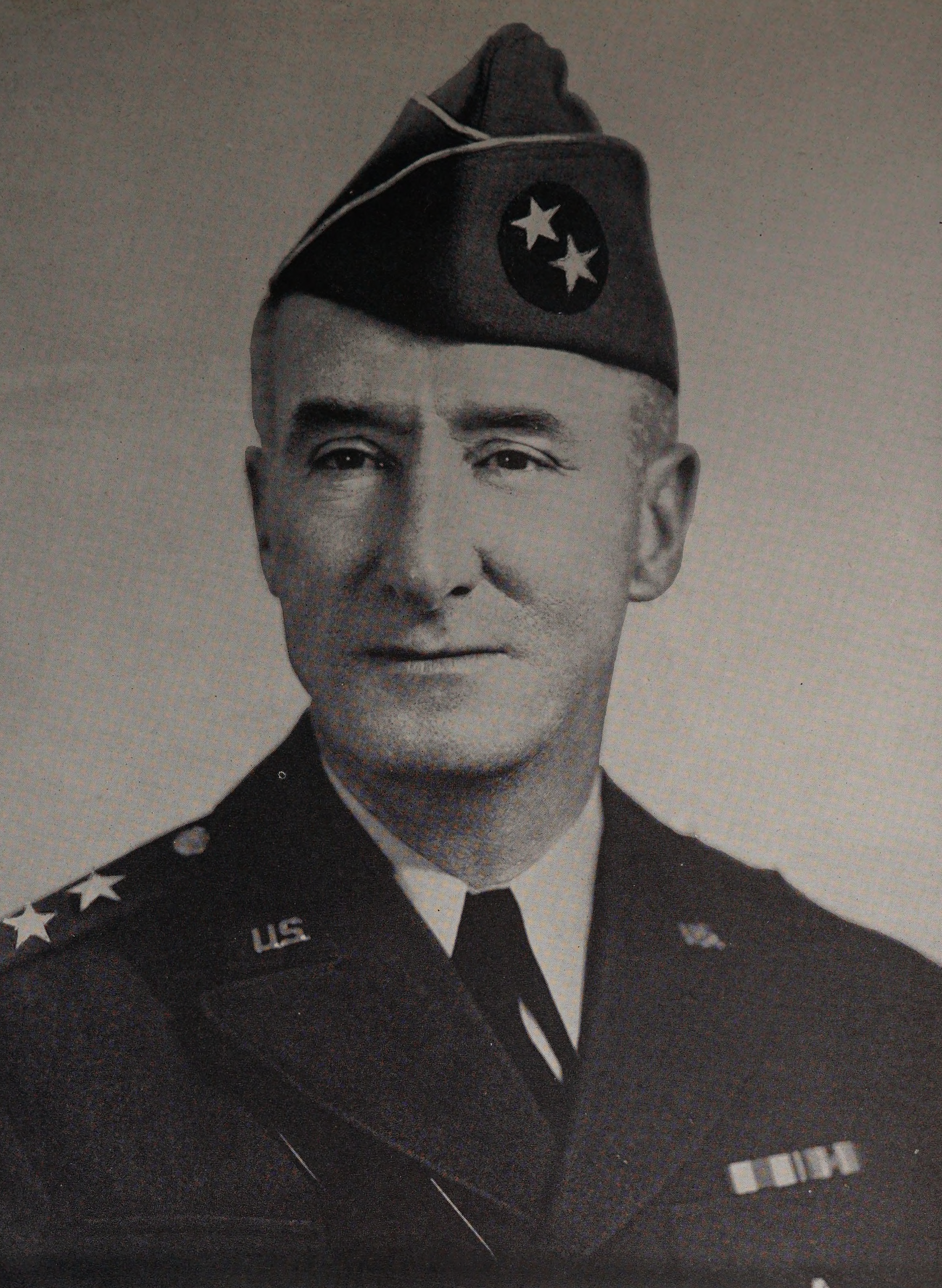
- Gillem Jr. as 3rd Armored Division commander c. 1941
- Born: August 8, 1888; Nashville, Tennessee, US
- Died: February 13, 1973 (aged 84); Atlanta, Georgia, US
- Burial place: Arlington National Cemetery, Virginia, US
- Relatives: Lieutenant General Alvan Cullem Gillem II (son)
- Military career
- Allegiance: United States
- Branch: United States Army
- Service years: 1910–1950
- Rank: Lieutenant General
- Service number: 0-3030
- Unit: Infantry Branch
- Commands: Third Army; XIII Corps; 3rd Armored Division; 2nd Armored Brigade; 66th Infantry Regiment (Light Tanks)
- Conflicts: Mexican Border Campaign; World War I Russian Civil War; World War II
- Awards: Distinguished Service Medal (2); Legion of Merit; Bronze Star

Lieutenant General Alvan Cullom Gillem Jr. (August 8, 1888 – February 13, 1973) was a United States Army officer who came from a family with a long military tradition and served in World War I, the Russian Civil War, and World War II. Gillem commanded the XIII Corps (United States), Ninth United States Army in the European Theater of Operations from September 1944 to September 1945.

== Early career ==
After attending the University of Arizona in 1908 and The University of the South at Sewanee, Gillem enlisted in the Regular Army in 1910 and served both as a private and a corporal with the 17th Infantry at Fort McPherson. On February 11, 1911, while still at Fort McPherson, he was appointed a second lieutenant of Infantry. He served in the Philippines and later served under Brigadier General John J. Pershing on the Mexican Border in 1916. During World War I, Gillem served with the American Expeditionary Forces in Siberia for eight months from 1918 to 1919.

In 1923, Captain Gillem attended the United States Army Command and General Staff College, followed by the United States Army War College two years later. He taught military science and tactics at the University of Maryland from 1930 to 1935. Then, Gillem taught at the United States Army Infantry School, despite never having graduated there. Following this, he was promoted to major. Gillem was promoted to lieutenant colonel and commanded an infantry battalion for two years. Then he commanded the 66th Infantry Regiment (Light Tanks) for 10 months, the only armored regiment in the United States Army at the time. He was promoted to brigadier general in January 1941 and then given command of the 2nd Armored Brigade. He became the first commanding general of the 3rd Armored Division from April 1941 to January 1942, dubbing it the "Spearhead" division. He received promotion to major general in December 1941.

== World War II ==
Early during World War II, Gillem was mostly stationed stateside. He was given command of the II Armored Corps (later redesignated XVIII Corps) and later the Armored Command at Fort Knox, Kentucky. Gillem commanded the XIII Corps, Ninth United States Army in the European Theater of Operations from September 1944 to September 1945. In June 1945 he was promoted to the rank of lieutenant general. His corps came within 50 miles of Berlin, the closest of all United States troops. He was selected to command the Armored Task Force that was scheduled to invade Japan, but Japan surrendered before the invasion plan was carried out.

== Postwar positions ==
=== Board for Utilization of Negro Manpower (1945–1946) ===
From October 1945 to April 1946, Gillem chaired the "Board for Utilization of Negro Manpower" (or Gillem Board). Its report, "Utilization of Negro Manpower in the Postwar Army Policy", was presented in April 1946. It is noted for its recommendations to retain segregation, as that was a policy external to the military, but introduce equal opportunity, as that would be the best use of military manpower.

Recommendations by the Board

- The number of black enlisted men should meet a quota of at least 10% of the Army's size. This would be proportional to the national population.
- Black troops would serve in all-black platoons or companies that would be integrated into all-white battalions. This would be done to share experience and knowledge, which would improve unit quality.
- Black enlisted men who were qualified should attend specialty and technical schools.
- Black commissioned officers would be promoted by the same standards as their white counterparts.

On March 17, 1949, Gillem and John J. McCloy (former Assistant Secretary of War during World War II) testified before the President's Committee on Equality of Treatment and Opportunity in the Armed Services. Gillem served on it from 1949 to 1950.

=== Command of the Third Army (1947–1950) ===
Gillem assumed command of the United States Third Army in June 1947. When the Third Army headquarters was moved from Atlanta, Georgia, to Fort McPherson in 1947, Gillem also assumed command of the post. In 1947 Gillem served as an assistant to General George C. Marshall on his presidential mission to China. He then served as special assistant to the commander of the United States forces in Nanking, commander of the China Service Command in Shanghai, and later American Commissioner in Peking.

Gillem retired from the army in August 1950 with the rank of lieutenant general.

=== Later life ===
Upon the end of his military career, Gillen served for four years as executive director of the National Foundation for the March of Dimes in the 1960s.

Gillem died on February 13, 1973, in an Atlanta Hospital at the age of 85. Both he and his wife Virginia (Harrison) Gillem are buried at Arlington National Cemetery, in Arlington, Virginia.

== Family ==
Gillem's grandfather, Alvan Cullem Gillem graduated from West Point in 1851. He served in the Civil War with the Union Army, finishing the war as a brevet major general of United States Volunteers. Gillem's parents were Colonel Alvan Cullom Gillem Sr., a cavalry officer in the United States Army, and Bessie Coykendall. Both were buried at Arlington National Cemetery.

On June 21, 1916, Gillem married Virginia Harrison (December 18, 1895 – October 25, 1964) in Nogales, Arizona.

Gillem had three children: Alvan, Richard, and Mary. The elder son, Alvan Cullem Gillem II, was born in Nogales in 1917 and became a lieutenant general in the United States Air Force. Gillem's second son, Richard D. Gillem, became a lieutenant colonel in the Army.

== Military awards ==
- Army Distinguished Service Medal with bronze oak leaf cluster
- Legion of Merit
- Bronze Star Medal
- Mexican Border Service Medal
- World War I Victory Medal
- American Defense Service Medal
- American Campaign Medal
- Asiatic-Pacific Campaign Medal
- World War II Victory Medal
- Army of Occupation Medal
- National Defense Service Medal
- Order of the Red Banner - Three Awards (Union of Soviet Socialist Republics)
- Dutch Grand Officer in the Order of Oranje Nassau (ON.2)

== Bibliography ==
- Taaffe, Stephen R. (2013). Marshall and His Generals: U.S. Army Commanders in World War II. Lawrence, Kansas: University Press of Kansas. ISBN 978-0-7006-1942-9. OCLC 840162019.

Military offices
Preceded by None	Commanding General 3rd Armored Division; 1941–1942	Succeeded by Walton Walker
Preceded by Jacob L. Devers	Commanding General, Armored Force; May 1943 – 1945	Succeeded by ?
Preceded by Emil F. Reinhardt	Commanding General of the XIII Corps; September 1944 – September 1945	Succeeded by Disbanded
Preceded by Edward H. Brooks	Commanding General of the Third United States Army; June 1947 – August 1950	Succeeded by John R. Hodge
