= 380th Air Expeditionary Wing =

380th Air Expeditionary Wing

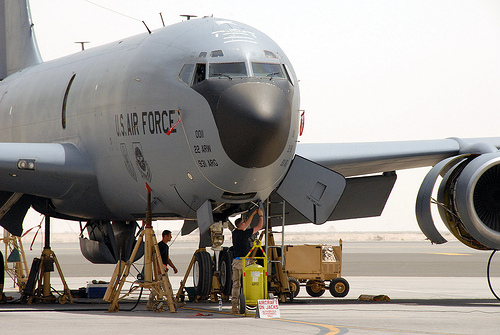
- A mechanic of the 380th Expeditionary Aircraft Maintenance Squadron working on one of the wing's KC-135 Stratotankers
- Active: 1942–1946; 1947–1951; 1955–1995; 2002–present
- Country: United States
- Branch: United States Air Force
- Role: Expeditionary air operations
- Part of: Air Combat Command: Ninth Air Force (Air Forces Central)
- Garrison/HQ: Al Dhafra Air Base, United Arab Emirates
- Nicknames: "The Flying Circus" and "King of the Heavies"
- Mottos: "Strength and Confidence"
- Engagements: World War II; Southwest Pacific, Australia (1943–1944), Philippines (1944): Southwest Asia Service (1990–1991); Global War on Terrorism; Afghanistan campaign (2001–2021)

Commanders
- Current commander: Colonel Benjamin Couchman

Insignia
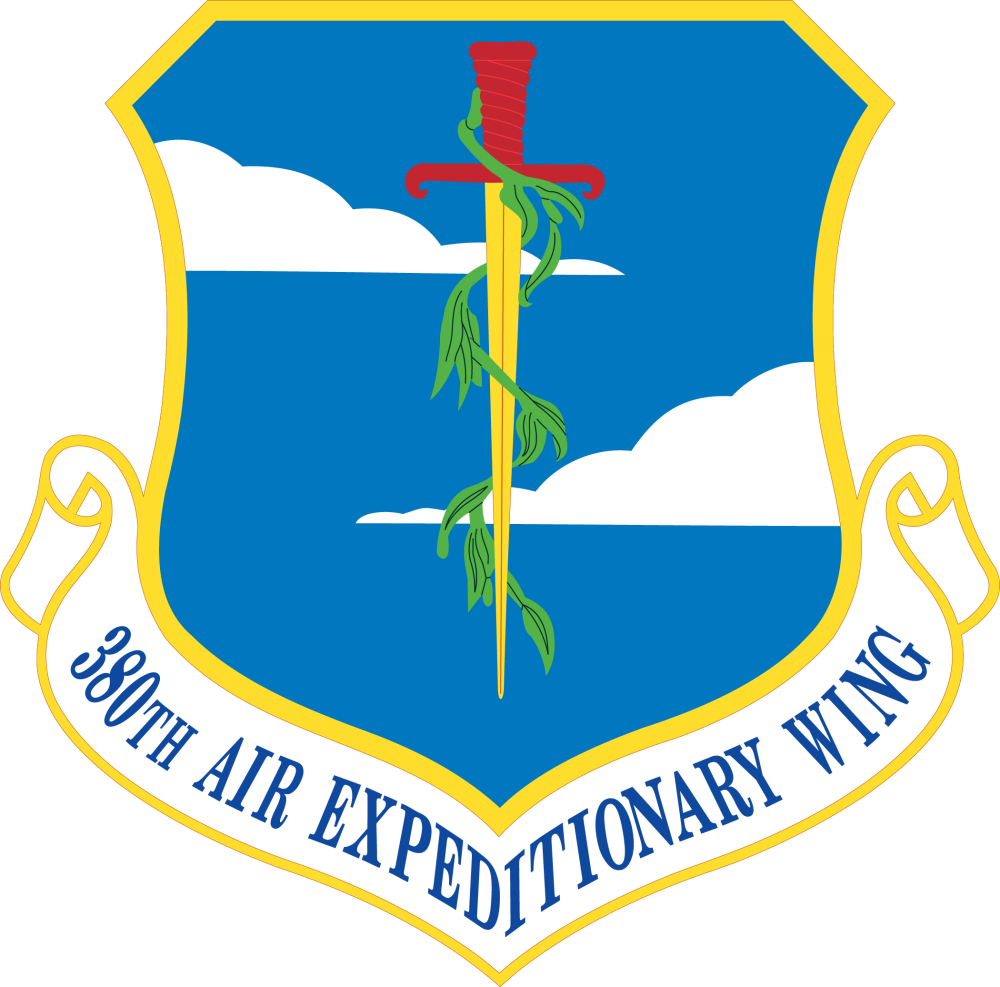
- 380th Air Expeditionary Wing emblem

The 380th Air Expeditionary Wing is a provisional unit of the United States Air Force Air Combat Command. It is attached to the United States Air Forces Central Command and is stationed at Al Dhafra Air Base, United Arab Emirates. Its mission is aerial refueling and reconnaissance.

The Wing's origins date to 1942 when the 380th Bombardment Group was established. It operated primarily in the Southwest Pacific Theater as a Consolidated B-24 Liberator heavy bomber unit assigned to Fifth Air Force.

Active for over 40 years, the 380th Bombardment Wing was a component organization of Strategic Air Command's deterrent force during the Cold War, as a strategic bombardment wing.

About 1,200 active duty military members, Reserve, and Air National Guard personnel make up the wing. The wing's aircraft include McDonnell Douglas KC-10 Extenders, Lockheed U-2 Dragon Ladies, Boeing E-3 Sentry airborne early warning aircraft, and Northrop Grumman RQ-4 Global Hawk reconnaissance drones.

== History ==
=== World War II ===
B-24s after an attack on Nauru in the Pacific

The history of the 380th dates back to 28 October 1942 when the 380th Bombardment Group (Heavy) was established. It was activated on 3 November 1942 at Davis–Monthan Field, Arizona. The 380th Group consisted of four squadrons, the 528th, 529th, 530th, and 531st Bombardment Squadrons. Shortly after being activated, the group moved to Biggs Field, Texas, where it underwent extensive combat training. After completing training, the 380th moved to Lowry Field, Colorado, to undergo final combat training. The 380th was part of Fifth Air Force, and was known as the Flying Circus and as the King of the Heavies (Note: Note the lion in the insigne.)

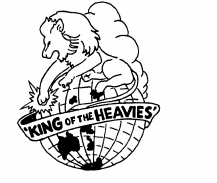
King of the Heavies insignia

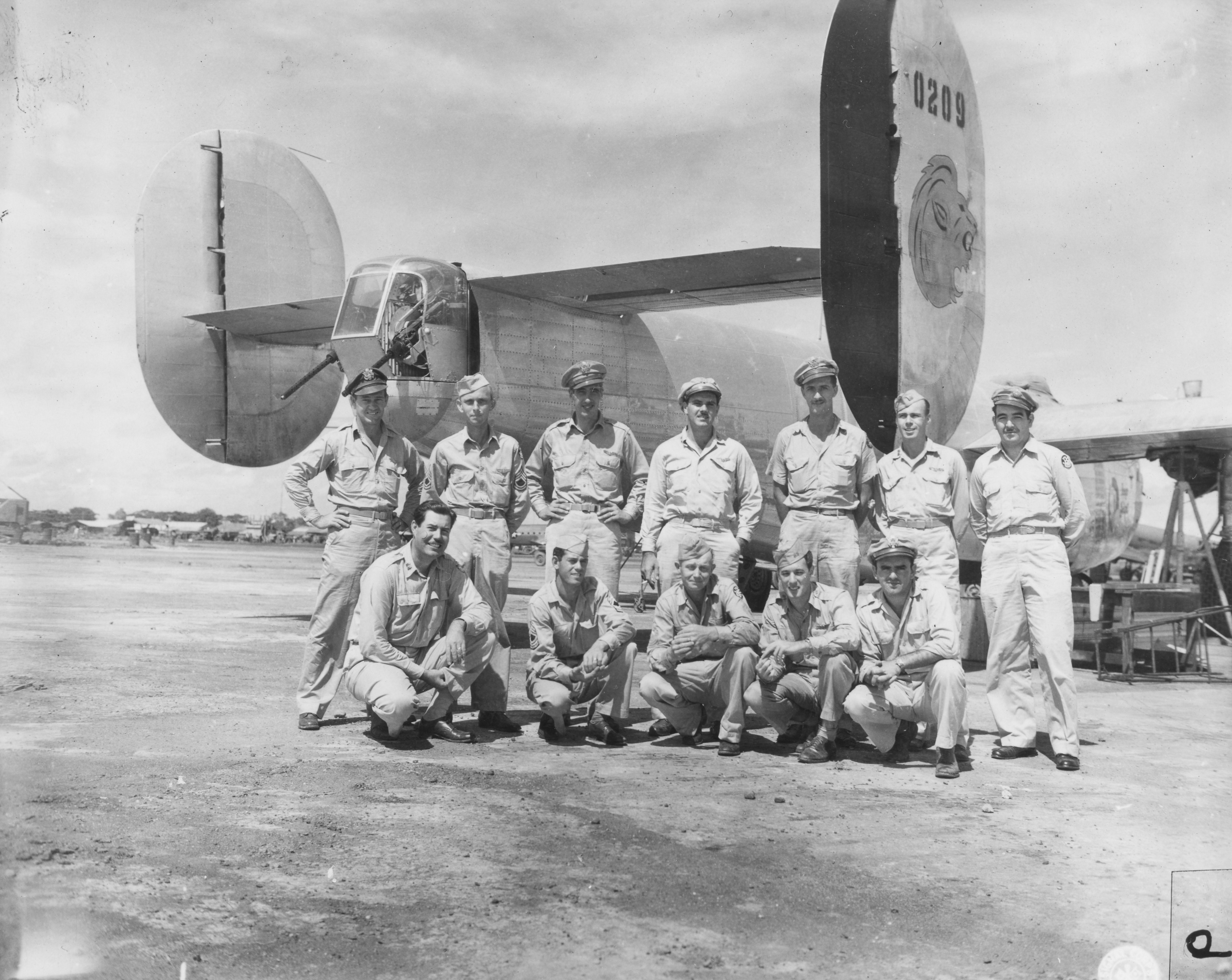
A homeward-bound B-24 Liberator of the 5th Air Force's 380th Bomb Group, 1945

The 380th went overseas in April 1943 to become the second Consolidated B-24 Liberator unit in the Fifth Air Force at that time after the 90th Bomb Group. The other heavy bomber unit, the 43d Bombardment Group, flew Boeing B-17 Flying Fortresses. The group arrived at Fenton Airfield, Australia, and also encompassed a part of Western Australia at Corunna Downs Airfield, a top secret airfield in the Pilbara, north of Perth, Western Australia in the Royal Australian Air Force's North-Western Area Command area of responsibility.

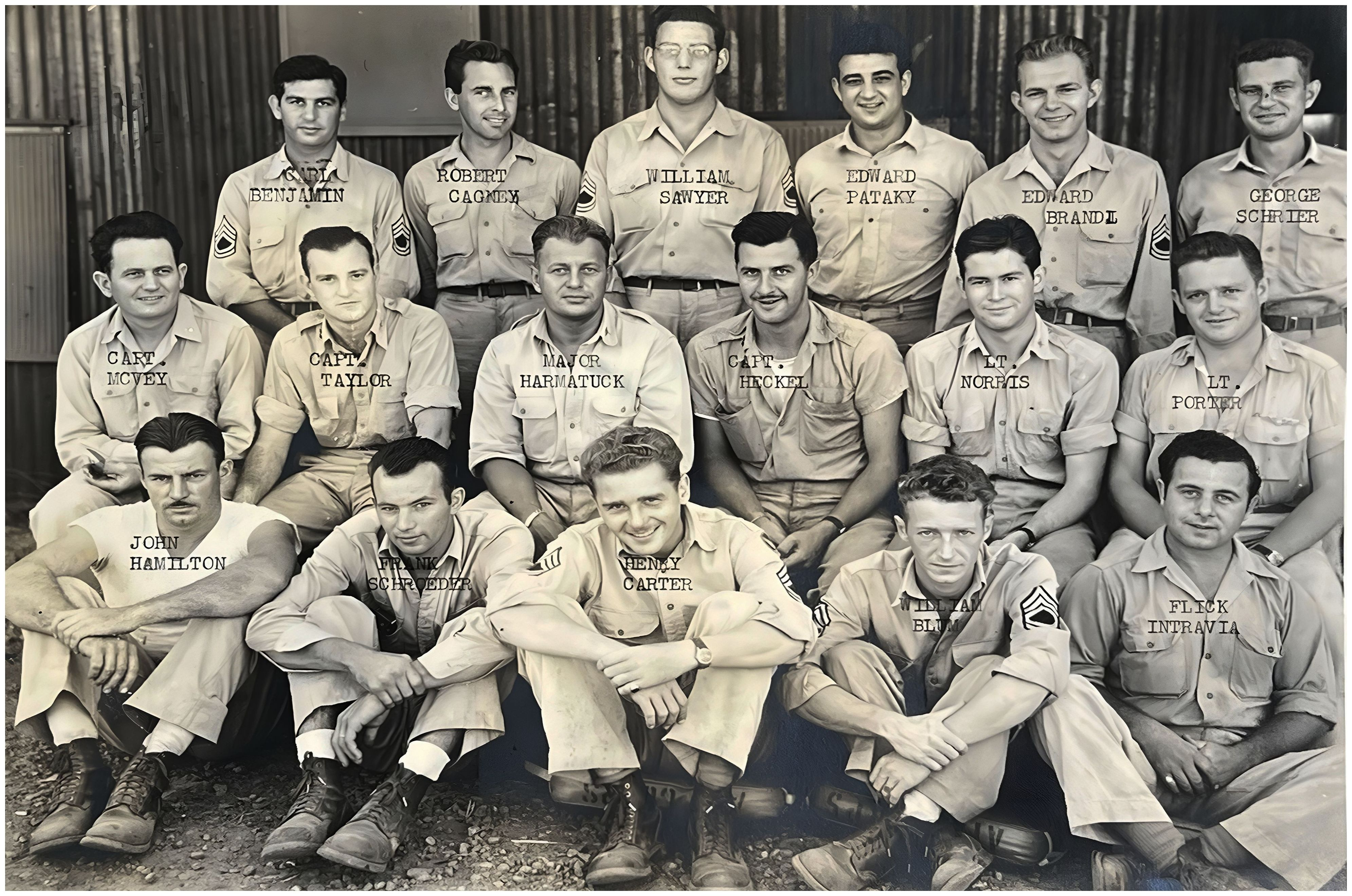

The Command's purpose was to engage in destroying Japanese strongholds in the Pacific. The group later moved to RAAF Base Darwin. Here it was placed under the Australian Northwest Area Command operating out of Darwin, Northern Territory. It was the only B-24 Liberator unit attached to the RAAF. The group was assigned to train RAAF personnel on the B-24 and to secure Australia's safety against a threatened Japanese invasion along its northern coast.

Upon its arrival in Australia, the group immediately began combat operations. It was the only heavy bomber unit available to cover the whole of the Dutch East Indies (1,000,000 square miles) from July 1943 until late in 1944. At that time the successes in the New Guinea campaign had brought the other Fifth Air Force units close enough to the East Indies to join the 380th in that task.

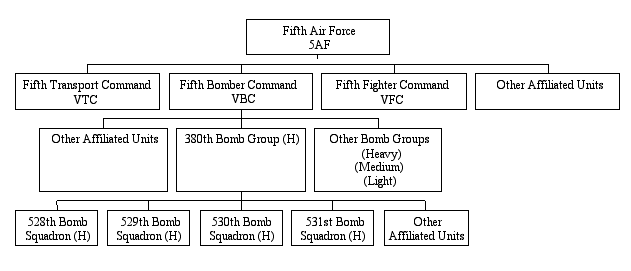
The 380th Air Expeditionary Wing, within the structure of the 5th Airforce

In April and May 1944, the 380th engaged in the most intensive and sustained operations since arrival in the southwest Pacific, neutralizing the rear bases through which the Japanese might reinforce their air force in the Wakde-Hollandia area of the Netherlands East Indies. From the end of May 1944 until it moved to Murtha Field, San Jose, Mindoro, Philippines in February 1945, the 380th concentrated on neutralizing enemy bases, installations and industrial compounds in the southern and central East Indies.

In April 1945, Far East Air Forces relieved the 380th of its ground support commitments in the Philippines. During the month, the Group flew the first heavy bomber strikes against targets in China and French Indochina. In June 1945, the 380th was placed under the operational control of the 13th Air Force for pre-invasion attacks against Labuan and on the oil refineries at Balikpapan in Borneo. For nearly two weeks, the Group's Liberators kept these targets under a state of aerial siege. After the Borneo raids, the 380th flew its last combat missions to Taiwan.

After the cessation of hostilities, the 380th moved to Okinawa and flew reconnaissance patrols over the Japanese islands. The group ferried released prisoners of war to Manila. On 18 October 1945, the unit was transferred to Seventh Air Force in the Philippines, where it moved to Clark Field on Luzon, and participated in the Sunset Project, the return of B-24s and their crews to the United States. Although some aircraft and crews were flown back to the United States, most of the aircraft from inactivating units were simply scrapped at Clark and personnel were returned via Navy ships from Manila.

In its service with the Australians, the 380th served longer under the operational control of an Allied country than any other Air Force unit, from June 1943 until February 1945. The 380th Group was inactivated on 20 February 1946.

==== B-24 Aircraft ====
The 380th was assigned to the South West Pacific War Area because of the long-range capabilities of the Liberator and the need for its services there at that point in the war, in Spring 1943. A total of 137 planes served in Australia and New Guinea. Of these, 53 served further in The Philippines.

The 380th made the longest bombing missions of WWII, to the oil refineries at Balikpapan, Borneo (200 miles further than the Ploesti mission in Europe) and to those at Surabaja, Java (as long as Ploesti). Both of these missions were accomplished several times during their stay in Australia.

In addition to attacks on the Japanese oil supply, the 380th was heavily engaged in crippling their shipping fleet to reduce the Japanese capability of supplying their far-flung forces. Numerous Japanese airfields were also heavily bombed in the East Indies to reduce the Japanese threat to Australia and New Guinea forces.

As part of its duties in Australia, the 380th carried out the operational training of 52 Australian crews and their associated ground staffs so that the Australians could take over the East Indian campaign activities of the 380th when they were assigned to The Philippines in February 1945.

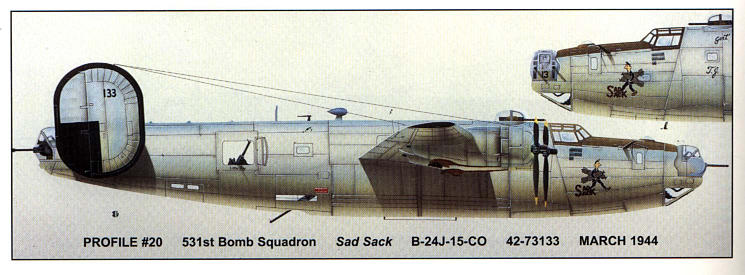
A B-24 with SAD SACK noseart

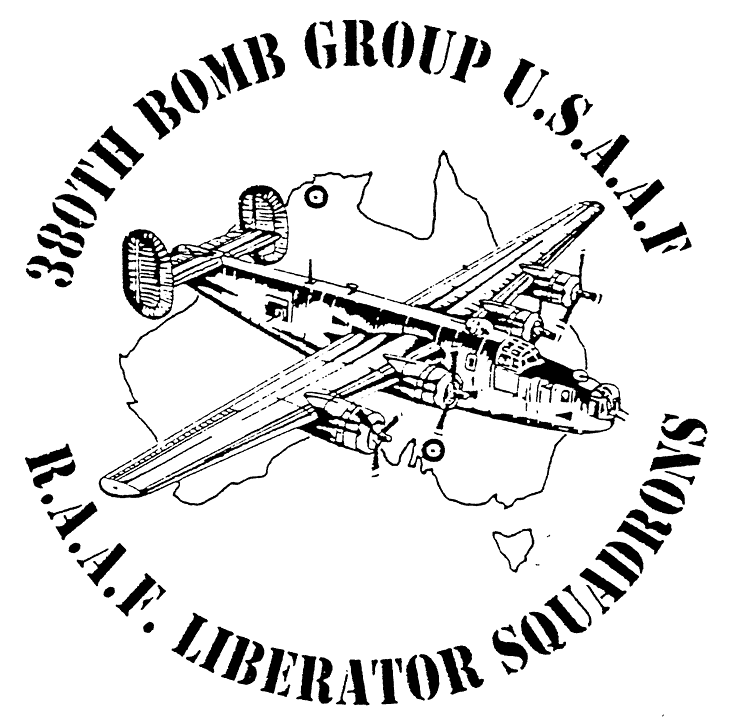
USAAF-380th-RAAF insignia

==== Cold War ====
The 380th Bombardment Group remained inactive from 20 February 1946 until its redesignation from Heavy to Very Heavy on 13 May 1947. On 29 May 1947, the Group was activated at MacDill Field, Florida, as a Boeing B-29 Superfortress reserve unit under the 49th Bombardment Wing. The group remained an inactive reserve unit until being called to active duty on 1 May 1951 during the Korean War. Fifteen days later on 16 May 1951, after the personnel had been processed for active duty and transferred to other units, the Group was inactivated.

=== Cold War ===
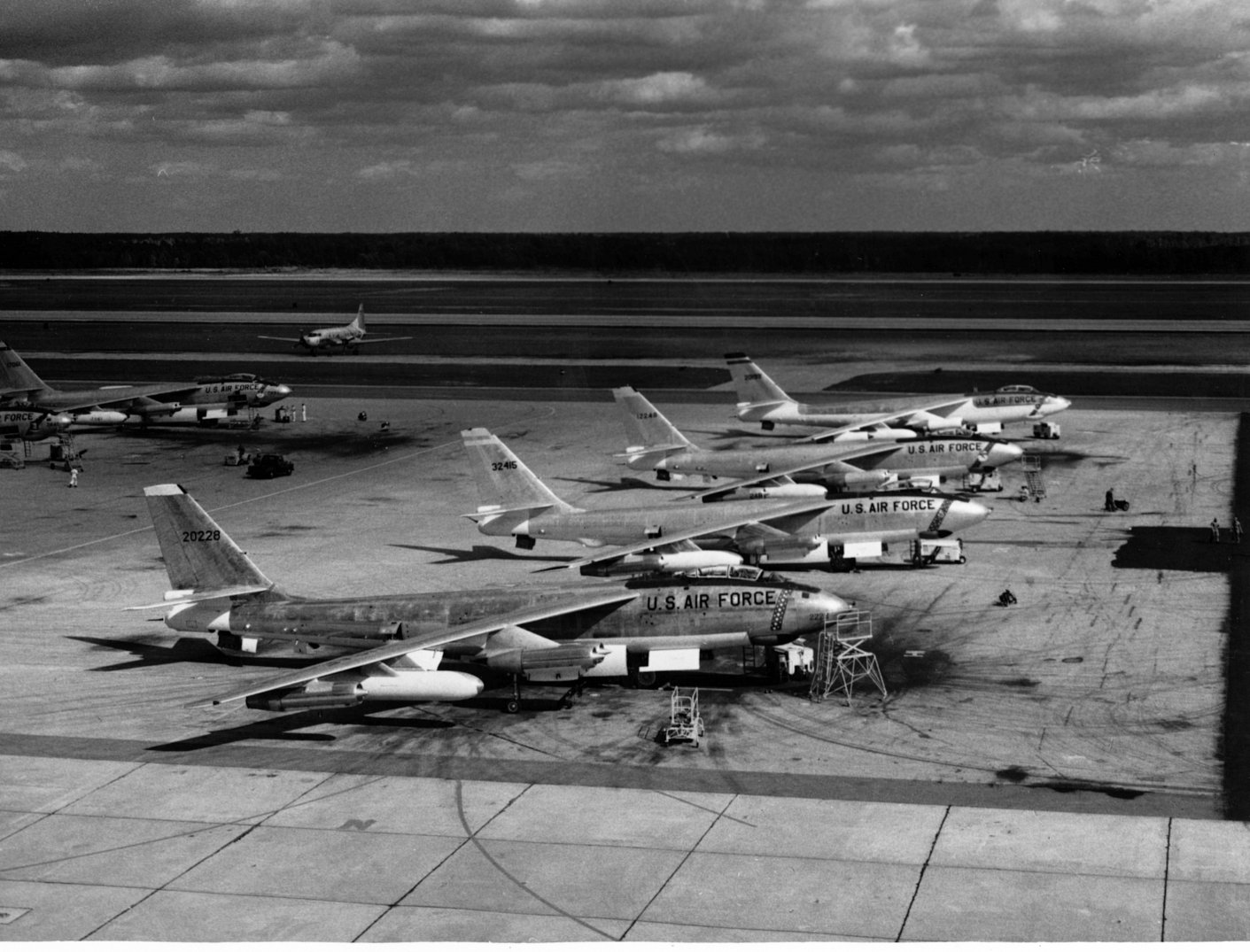
B-47Es on the flightline

The 380th Bombardment Wing, Medium was established at Plattsburgh Air Force Base, New York, on 11 July 1955 and assigned to Strategic Air Command (SAC) Eighth Air Force. For the next 40 years, the 380th was a front line SAC wing during the Cold War.

Along with the wing's activation, the 528th, 529th and 530th Bombardment Squadrons were also activated. In July and August, the personnel assigned to the Wing arrived at Plattsburgh. In December 1955, the first Boeing B-47 Stratojet medium bomber was assigned to the Wing but instead of being flown to Plattsburgh, was delivered to Pinecastle Air Force Base, Florida, as Detachment 1of the wing because of the delays in completing the base facilities at Plattsburgh.

Major Harold L. Neal piloted the first flight of a B-47 by a 380th's crew on 27 January 1956 at Pinecastle. For the next several months, training continued while additional B-47s were assigned to the Wing. By the end of January 1956, 16 B-47s were assigned to the wing and increased to 30 by the end of April. The first B-47E arrived on 21 March 1956 piloted by Brigadier General Kenneth O. Sanborn, first commander of the 820th Air Division, also headquartered at Plattsburgh AFB, but temporarily assigned to Pinecastle. The aircraft was christened "City of Plattsburgh" the next day.

By June 1956, the runway and essential facilities were completed at Plattsburgh and the wing and Air Division moved its aircraft and headquarters to the newly constructed base from Florida. In September 1956, the 380th Air Refueling Squadron, flying the Boeing KC-97 Stratofreighter, was transferred to Plattsburgh from Sheppard Air Force Base, Texas. The wing was declared combat ready on 1 October 1956.

In April 1957, the 380th deployed to RAF Brize Norton, England for a three-month period as part of an Operation Reflex deployment. During this deployment, Wing's B-47 inaugurated the "Three Capitals" air race. The occasion was the Paris Air Show held at Paris–Le Bourget Airport in Paris. On 28 May 1957, three B-47s from the 380th BW took off from Brize Norton and flew over Le Bourget to start the race. The objective of the race was to fly from Paris to Madrid to Rome and back to Paris.

The prize was the General Electric Trophy. A B-47E from the 529th Squadron won the 2,346 statute miles (3,776 km) race in 4 hours 12 minutes and 7 seconds, with an average speed of 558 miles per hour (898 km/h). The aircraft, commanded by Capt. Robert E. Sheridan was piloted by 1stLt. J.L. Mombrea with Capt. Frank R. Beadle as Observer.

On 18 July 1957, the Wing suffered its first peacetime major accident. A KC-97G from the 380th Air Refueling Squadron with a crew of eight exploded and crashed into Lake Champlain when 2 of the 4 engines failed 3 minutes after take-off from Plattsburgh at 9:28 p.m. During February 1959, the wing gained both the 820th Air Base Group and the 4020th USAF Hospital. Both of these units had previously been assigned to the 820th Air Division, located at Plattsburgh. The 531st Bombardment Squadron was activated and assigned to the 380th in May 1959. Later that year, on 7 August, another unit was attached to the Wing from the 820th Air Division, the 26th Air Refueling Squadron. The 531st was inactivated on 1 January 1962.

Between 20 July 1962 and 24 December 1964, the 380th also flew EB-47 assigned to the 4365th Post Attack Command and Control Squadron. On 15 January 1962, the Wing suffered its second aircraft lost when a B-47E assigned to the 529th Squadron on a routine training flight making bomb runs over Fort Drum crashed on the southeast slope of Wright's Peak, a mountain top 60 miles (97 km) south of Plattsburgh. The wreckage was discovered on the 21st by a group of US Army pilots from Fort Devens, Massachusetts.

In October 1962, the Wing responded to the Cuban Missile Crisis by deploying eight of its B-47s to a dispersal base. These aircraft and personnel stayed at the dispersal base until 25 November 1962, with the remaining aircraft and personnel on alert at Plattsburgh.

On 15 September 1964, the wing was redesignated the 380th Strategic Aerospace Wing and was composed of added the 556th Strategic Missile Squadron. On 18 September, the Wing received its first Boeing KC-135A Stratotanker, flown by Col. Harold J. Whiteman, the wing commander and a four-man crew composed of Maj. Creston Fowler (commander), Capt. Robert J. Svoboda (co-pilot), Capt. Robert D. Smith (navigator) and TSgt. Roy W. Rebstock (boomer). The aircraft was christened the same day, "Spirit of the North Country" by Mrs Gladys Ellison. Mrs Ellison's husband was SMSgt. Guin B. Ellison, Maintenance Supervisor of the Year for the 380th.

September 1965 saw one of the Wing's B-47s, "Pride of the Adirondacks" departing Plattsburgh for SAC's 14th Bombing and Navigation Competition at Fairchild Air Force Base, Washington. Six days later, that same aircraft returned to Plattsburgh being hailed as the "World's Best B-47" after having won top honors among all SAC B-47 units in 3 of 4 competition areas for the B-47s. "Pride of the Adirondacks" was commanded by Maj. Charles W. Patrick with Capt. John V. Wilcox for co-pilot, Maj. Robert A. Wickland as navigator and S/Sgt. John F. Navroth as Crew Chief.

The crew won 'Best B-47 Crew, Bombing', 'Best B-47 Crew, Combined' and 'Best B-47 Unit'. Within three weeks of that triumph, the first B-47 departed for storage at Davis–Monthan Air Force Base, Arizona, as part of an accelerated phase-out of the type. On 14 December, a ceremony was held as the final three B-47s departed Plattsburgh for the Arizona's storage facility. "Pride of the Adirondacks" was preserved and put on display at the entrance of the base on 8 February 1966.

==== Atlas missiles ====
In 1961 and 1962, construction began on 12 SM-65 Atlas missile sites. The sites were built within a 50 miles (80 km) radius of the base and were completed in 1963. The squadron was equipped with 13 missiles, allowing each silo to have an Atlas missile, with one left for spare. When one missile in a silo was scheduled for maintenance, the spare missile was sent to replace it. This allowed the 380th to maintain 12 ready to launch missiles seven days a week.

All sites were in New York state, except for two located on the other side of Lake Champlain in Vermont. The 556th Strategic Missile Squadron became completely operational on 15 September 1964. This was the last Atlas squadron to be accepted and the only Intercontinental ballistic missile base east of the Mississippi River. The 556th's last operational day was 30 April 1965 with the squadron's inactivation on 25 June 1965.

==== B-52 era ====
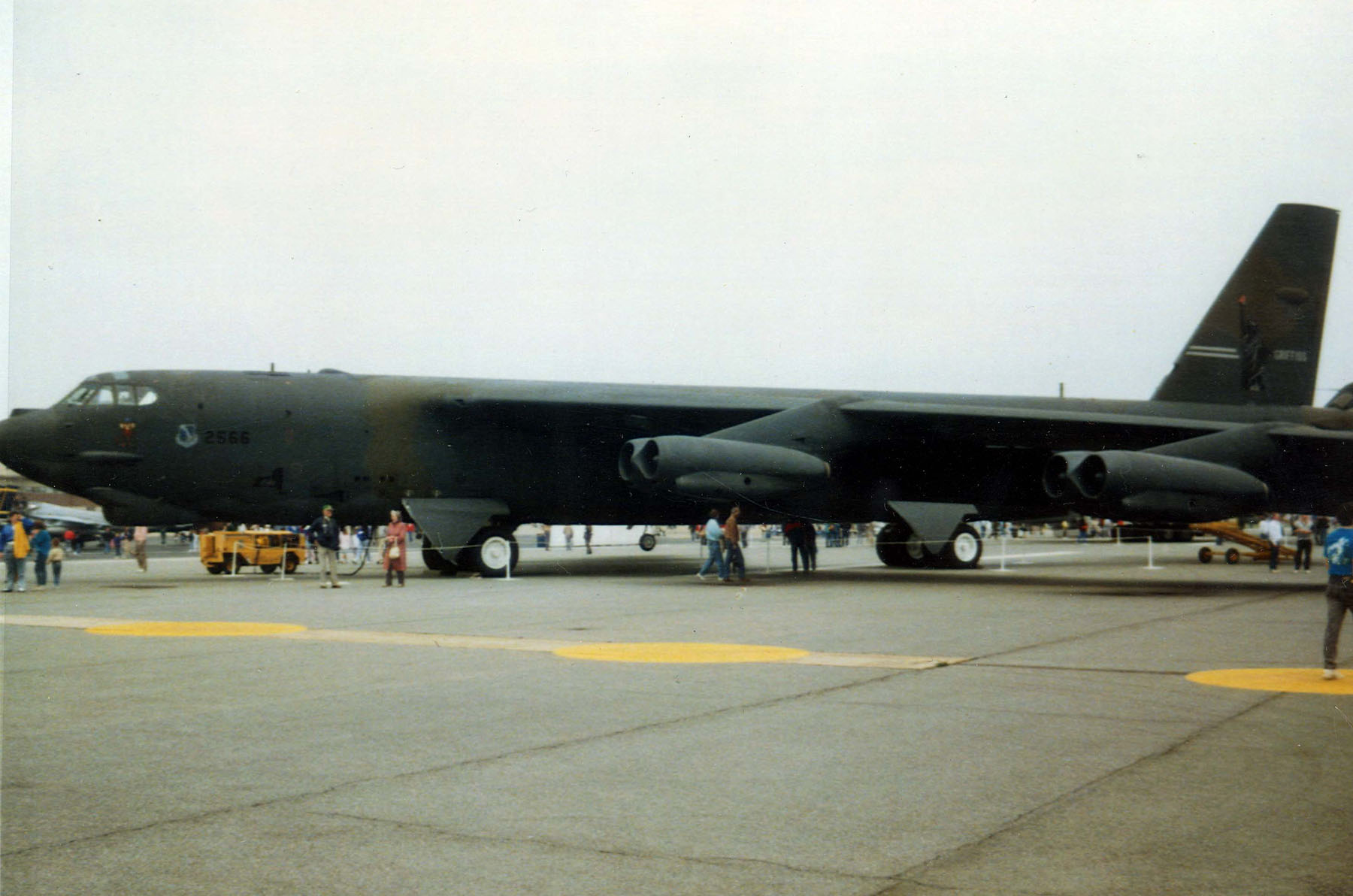
A B-52G on the flightline

To replace the B-47s, the Wing was assigned the Boeing B-52G Stratofortress bomber. It received its first aircraft, christened "Champlain Lady" on 19 June 1966. After the arrival of the new type, another new unit was assigned to the Wing on 25 January 1967, the 310th Air Refueling Squadron.

On 21 January 1968, tragedy struck the wing again when B-52G, serial 58-0188, crashed near Thule Air Base in Greenland while on a Chrome Dome mission. The aircraft was flown by a crew from the 528th Squadron and was carrying four hydrogen bombs when it crashed into an ice covered bay at the western tip of Greenland. The crew of seven was composed of Capt. John Baug (commander), Capt. Leonard Svitenko (co-pilot), Maj. Frank Hopkins (radar navigator), Capt. Curtis Criss (navigator), Capt. Richard Marx (electronic warfare), SSgt. Calvin Snapp (gunner) and Maj. Alfred J. D'amario (safety officer from Wing HQ). Capt. Svitenko was killed during the crash.

The Wing's involvement in the Vietnam War was one of temporary duty assignments. Tanker and bomber crews of the 380th were temporarily assigned to the Pacific theater in support of B-52 Operation Arc Light missions and KC-135 Operation Young Tiger. The KC-135 crews and aircraft supported Southeast Asia operations from October 1966 until 1973. The B-52 crews served from 1968 until 1970.

==== FB-111 era ====
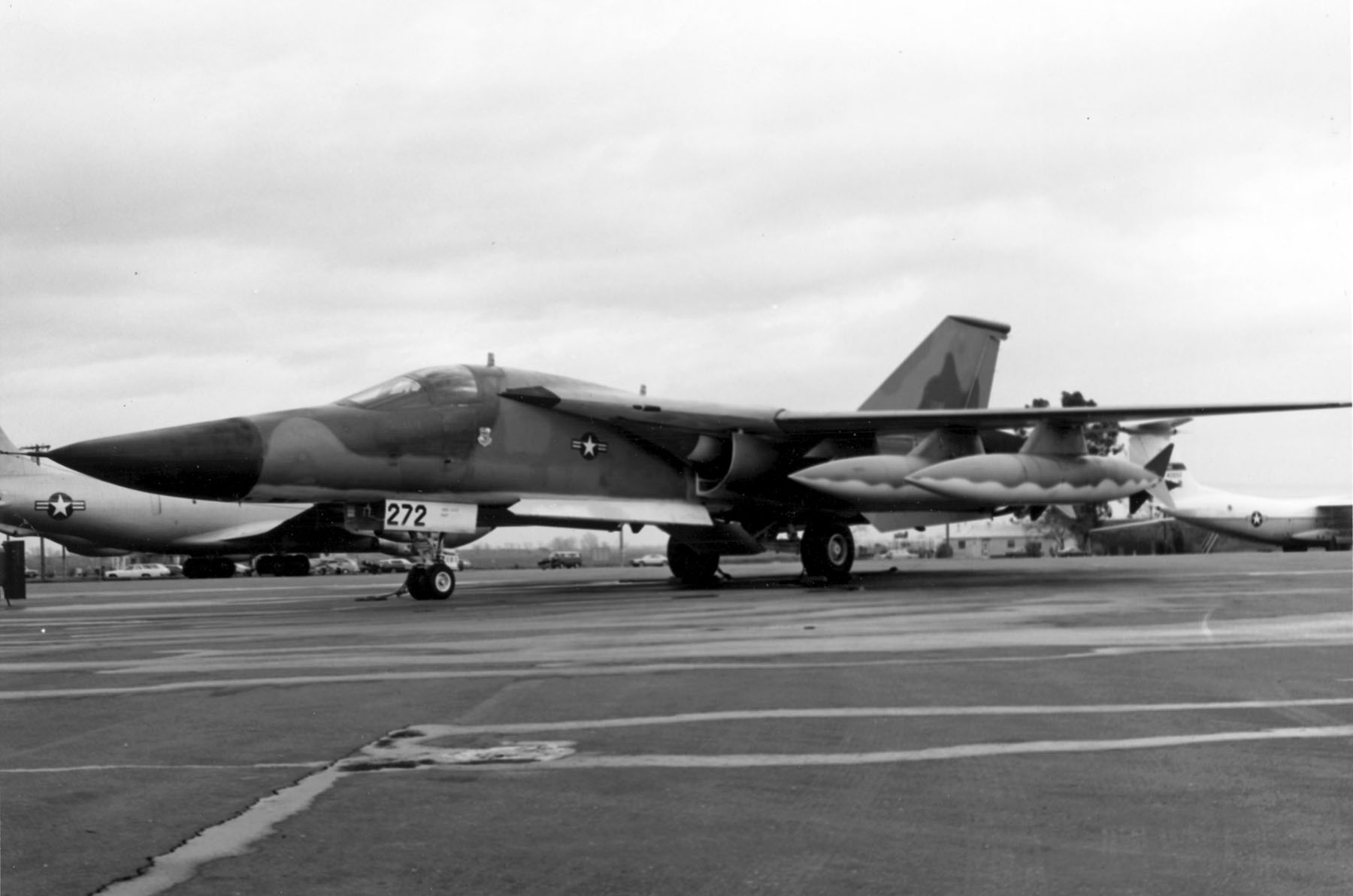
A General Dynamics FB-111A (AF Ser. No. 68–0272) of the 380th SAW, February 1973

In 1968, plans were initiated to bring the Air Force's newest strategic aircraft, the General Dynamics FB-111 Aardvark to Plattsburgh. The FB-111A was the all-weather strategic bombing version of the F-111, intended as an interim successor to the B-52 and Convair B-58 Hustler of Strategic Air Command.

In October 1969, the FB-111A entered service with the 4007th Combat Crew Training Squadron of the 340th Bomb Group at Carswell Air Force Base, Texas. Even though the FB-111A was officially declared operational, it had yet to reach the combat forces. After reaching operational capability, the 4007th relocated to Plattsburg and became part of the wing.

By the end of 1970, B-52s were transferred to Fairchild Air Force Base, Washington. The last B-52G left Plattsburgh on 5 January 1971. Construction requirements for the new FB-111A were completed in 1969. Col. G.R. Abendhoff, 380th commander, piloted the first FB-111A to the base during Open house ceremonies on 17 July 1971.

On 1 July 1972, the 380th Wing was redesignated the 380th Bombardment Wing, Medium. During the 1974 SAC bombing and navigation competition, the FB-111 and KC-135 crews from the 380th combined their effort with the support personnel to prove to be "The best of the best". The 380th was the first Wing equipped with the FB-111A to win the competition and would dominate again in the years to come.

1980 began with a new challenge for the Wing after being named the official military support installation for the 1980 Winter Olympics at Lake Placid, New York. The 380th coordinated helicopter rescue mission conducted by the 38th Aerospace Rescue and Recovery Squadron.

The 380th Group was consolidated with the 380th Wing on 31 January 1984.

In 1984, the 380th once again proved itself worthy of its motto, "Best of the Best", as it achieved an unprecedented fifth Fairchild Trophy at the annual SAC Bombing and Navigation Competition. In addition to winning the Fairchild, which established a record of five trophies for one unit, the Wing captured its second Saunders Trophy for the best air refueling unit and the "Best FB-111 Crew Award". In 1985, the 380th BW received the pinnacle award for SAC Wings. The Omaha Trophy for the best overall SAC wing for the 1984 calendar year was awarded to the Wing in July.

During the summer of 1988, a full complement of the 380th Wing deployed for the first time since World War II. Over 300 men and women deployed to a forward operating base in support of "Mighty Warrior 88", an SAC wide exercise held to better enable the various SAC wings to carry out their respective missions under austere conditions.

As the Rockwell B-1B Lancer came into service, the FB-111A became redundant to SAC needs. In 1988, most FB-111As began a conversion into a ground attack configuration, the F-111G – less their nuclear delivery capability. As the aircraft were converted, they were reassigned to Tactical Air Command training units, operating out of Cannon Air Force Base, New Mexico.

=== Post Cold War ===
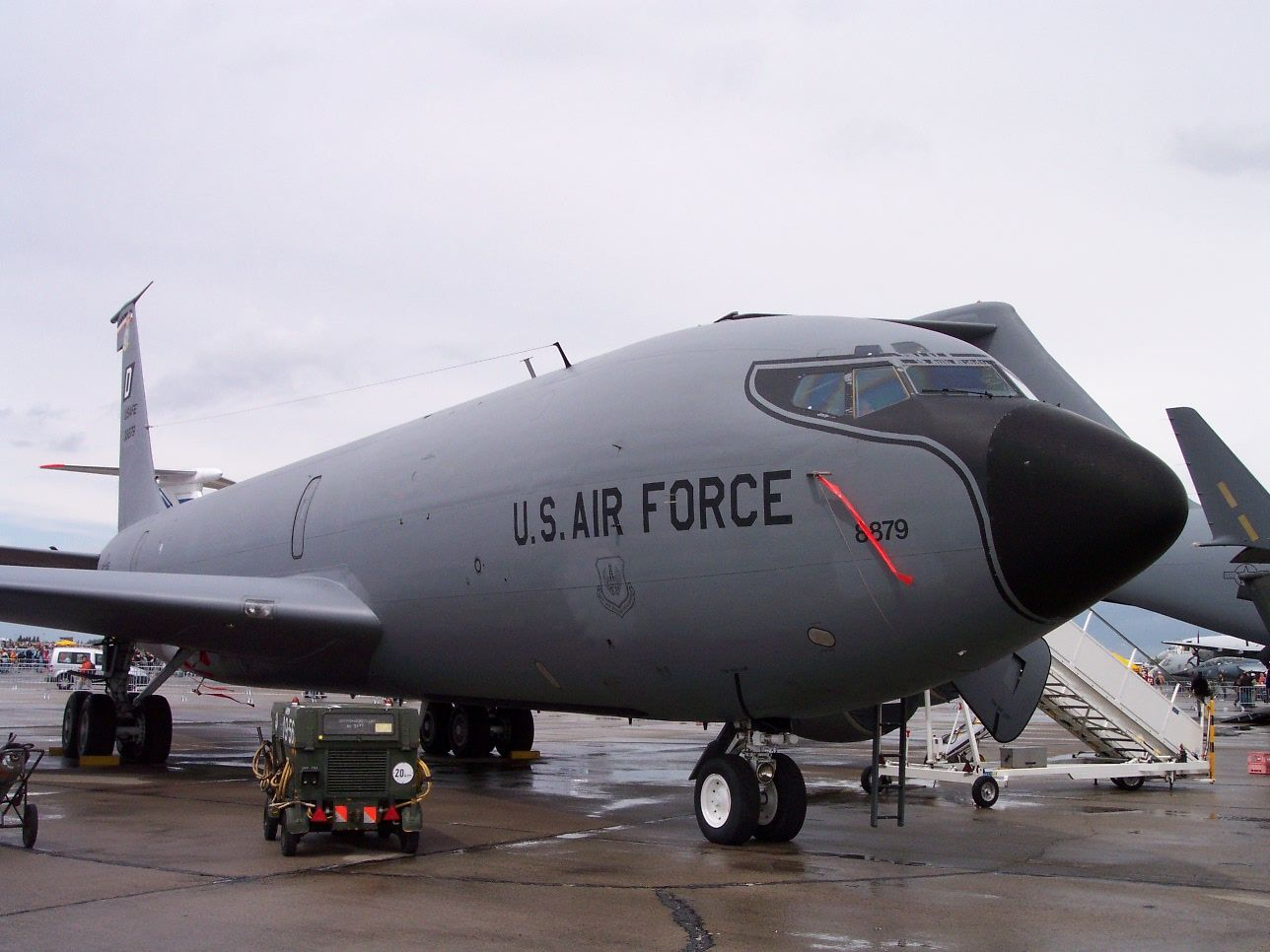
A Boeing KC-135 from the 100th Air Refueling Wing at RAF Mildenhall, UK

In September 1990, crews from both air refueling squadrons combined with personnel from other units to form the 1703rd Air Refueling Wing (Provisional) in Saudi Arabia, supporting Operations Desert Shield and Desert Storm.

On 10 July 1991, Strategic Air Command and the 380th Wing said goodbye to the FB-111A when the last 4 operational aircraft left Plattsburgh for their final flight to preservation in museums. The 380th Wing was redesignated the 380th Air Refueling Wing a few days earlier on 1 July 1991. The mission of the wing was to provide worldwide air refueling with its KC-135A/Q Stratotankers and served as host to the Tanker Task Force operation. The 380th Tanker Task Force was responsible for supporting most of the transoceanic operations on the East Coast.

The wing was absorbed by Fifteenth Air Force, Air Mobility Command, in June 1992 with the inactivation of SAC. As a result of the 1993 Base Realignment and Closure Commission, Plattsburgh was closed in September 1995 and the 380th Wing was inactivated.

=== Twenty-first century ===
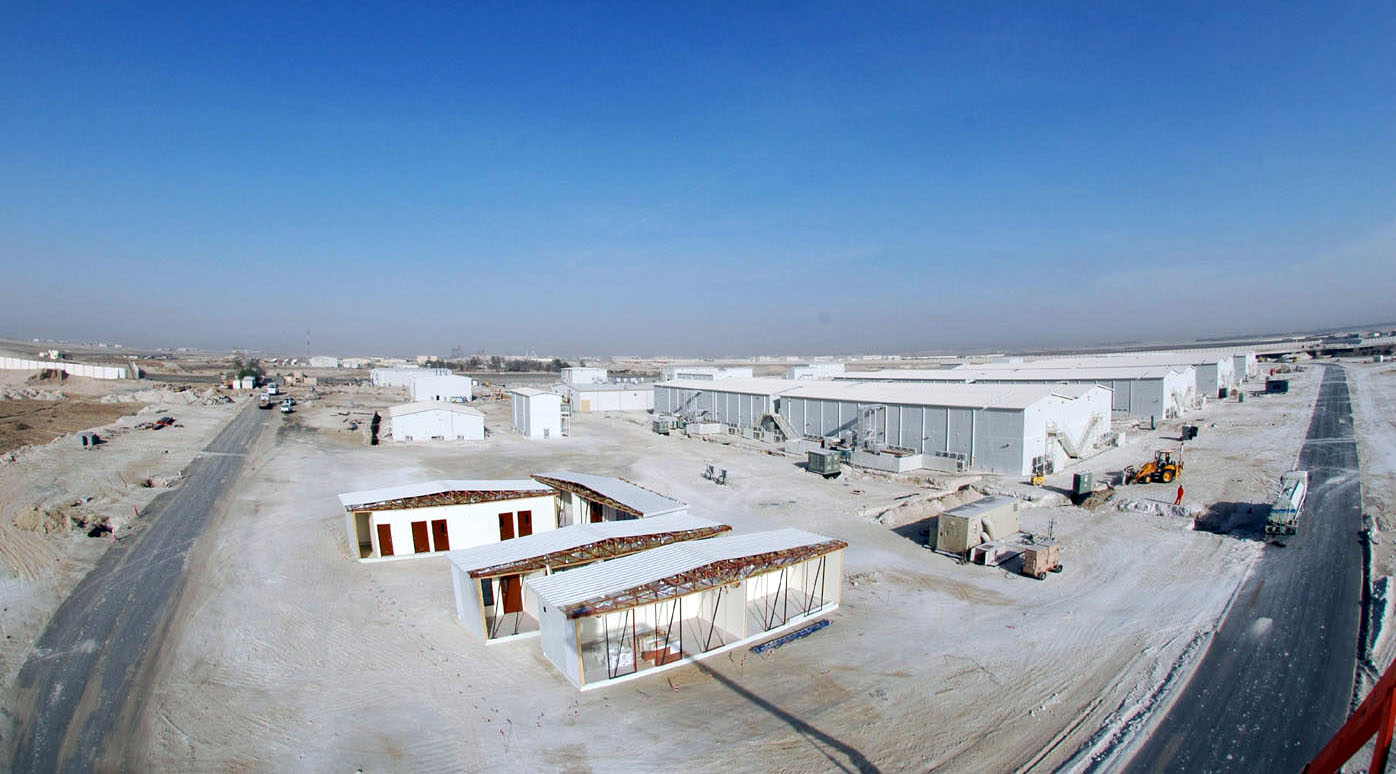
New facilities being constructed, February 2006

The 380th Air Expeditionary Wing was reactivated at Al Dhafra Air Base in the United Arab Emirates in January 2002 to support the War in Afghanistan. The wing fought in the Afghan War, in the Iraq War (2003–2010), and in Operation Inherent Resolve against ISIS/Daesh.

Units in 2019 included:

- 380th Expeditionary Operations Group
- 380th Expeditionary Maintenance Group

380th Expeditionary Aircraft Maintenance Squadron
380th Expeditionary Maintenance Squadron

- 380th Expeditionary Mission Support Group

380th Expeditionary Contracting Squadron
380th Expeditionary Communications Squadron
380th Expeditionary Civil Engineer Squadron
380th Expeditionary Logistics Readiness Squadron
380th Expeditionary Security Forces Squadron
380th Expeditionary Force Support Squadron

- 380th Expeditionary Medical Group

== Lineage ==
380th Bombardment Group

- Constituted as the 380th Bombardment Group (Heavy) on 28 October 1942

Activated on 3 November 1942
Redesignated 380th Bombardment Group, Heavy on 26 August 1944
Inactivated on 20 February 1946
Redesignated 380th Bombardment Group, Very Heavy
Activated in the reserve on 16 June 1947
Redesignated 380th Bombardment Group, Medium on 26 June 1949
Ordered to active duty on 1 May 1951
Inactivated on 16 May 1951
Consolidated with the 380th Bombardment Wing as the 380th Bombardment Wing on 31 January 1984

380th Air Expeditionary Wing

- Established as the 380th Bombardment Wing, Medium on 23 March 1953

Activated on 11 July 1955
Redesignated 380th Strategic Aerospace Wing on 15 September 1964
Redesignated 380th Bombardment Wing, Medium on 1 July 1972
Consolidated with the 380th Bombardment Group on 31 January 1984
Redesignated 380th Air Refueling Wing on 1 July 1991
Inactivated on 30 September 1995
Redesignated 380th Air Expeditionary Wing and converted to provisional status on 4 December 2001.
Activated in January 2002

=== Assignments ===
- 16th Bombardment Wing (later 16th Bombardment Operational Training Wing), 3 November 1942
- V Bomber Command, c. 28 April 1943 (attached to Northwest Area Command, Royal Australian Air Force), 1 June 1943 – January 1945
- 310th Bombardment Wing, 24 March – 9 August 1945
- V Bomber Command, c. 9 August 1945
- VII Bomber Command, 9 October 1945
- Far East Air Forces, c. 28 Nov 1945 – 20 Feb 1946
- 49th Bombardment Wing (later 49 Air Division), 16 June 1947
- Fifteenth Air Force (attached to 307th Bombardment Group), 26 Jun 1949
- Second Air Force, 1 April 1950 – 16 May 1951
- Eighth Air Force, 11 July 1955
- 820th Air Division (later 820th Strategic Aerospace Division), 1 February 1956 (attached to 7th Air Division, 3 April – 3 July 1957)
- 817th Air Division, 25 June 1965
- 45th Air Division, 1 July 1968
- 817th Air Division, 2 July 1969
- 45th Air Division, 30 June 1971
- Eighth Air Force, 29 March 1989
- Fifteenth Air Force, 1 September 1991
- Twenty-First Air Force, 1 July 1993 – 30 September 1995
- Air Combat Command to activate or inactivate as needed. 4 December 2001

attached to United States Air Forces Central Command (later Ninth Air Force (Air Forces Central), c. January 2002 – present

=== Components ===
Operational Groups

- 380th Operations Group: 1 September 1991 – 1 October 1994
- 458th Operations Group: 1 July 1993 – 1 April 1994

Operational Squadrons

- No. 24 Squadron, Royal Australian Air Force: attached May–December 1944
- 26th Air Refueling Squadron: attached 7 August 1957 – 31 July 1959, assigned 1 August 1959 – 1 April 1961
- 310th Air Refueling Squadron: 25 January 1967 – 1 September 1991
- 380th Air Refueling Squadron: 16 August 1956 – 1 April 1961; 15 September 1964 – 1 September 1991
- 528th Bombardment Squadron: 3 November 1942 – 20 February 1946; 16 June 1947 – 16 May 1951; 11 July 1955 – 1 July 1991
- 529th Bombardment Squadron: 3 November 1942 – 20 February 1946; 17 July 1947 – 27 June 1949; 11 July 1955 – 25 June 1966 and 6 January 1971 – 1 September 1991
- 530th Bombardment Squadron (later 530th Strategic Bombardment Training Squadron, 530th Combat Crew Training Squadron): 3 November 1942 – 20 February 1946; 17 July 1947 – 27 June 1949; 11 July 1955 – 25 June 1966, 1 July 1986 – 1 July 1991
- 531st Bombardment Squadron: 3 November 1942 – 20 February 1946; 16 June 1947 – 27 June 1949; 1 May 1959 – 1 January 1962
- 556th Strategic Missile Squadron: 15 September 1964 – 25 June 1965

=== Stations ===
- Davis–Monthan Field, Arizona, 3 November 1942
- Biggs Field, Texas, 2 December 1942
- Lowry Field, Colorado, 4 March – 17 April 1943
- Fenton Airfield, Australia, May 1943 (Note: Air echelon only. The ground echelon arrived 24 June 1943.)
- RAAF Base Darwin, Australia, 9 August 1944
- McGuire Field, Mindoro, Philippines, 20 February 1945
- Motobu Airfield, Okinawa, 9 August 1945
- Fort William McKinley, Luzon, Philippines, 28 November 1945 – 20 February 1946
- MacDill Field (later MacDill Air Force Base), Florida, 16 June 1947 – 16 May 1951
- Plattsburgh Air Force Base, New York, 11 July 1955 – 30 September 1995
- Al Dhafra Air Base, United Arab Emirates, c. January 2002 – present

=== Aircraft and missiles ===
- Consolidated B-24 Liberator (1942–1945)
- Boeing B-47 Stratojet (1955–1965)
- Boeing KC-97 Stratofreighter (1956–1961)
- Boeing EB-47E Stratojet (1963–1964)
- SM-65 Atlas (1964–1965)
- Boeing KC-135 Stratotanker (1964–1994; Since January 2002)
- Boeing B-52G Stratofortress (1966–1971)
- General Dynamics FB-111A Aardvark (1971–1991)
- McDonnell Douglas KC-10A Extender (1993–1994)
- Boeing E-3B/C Sentry (Since January 2002)
- Northrop Grumman RQ-4 Global Hawk (Since January 2002)
- Lockheed Martin F-22 Raptor (Present)

== See also ==
- List of B-47 units of the United States Air Force
- List of B-52 Units of the United States Air Force
