= 2010 Cincinnati Bengals season =

NFL team season

- Owner: Mike Brown
- Head coach: Marvin Lewis
- Home stadium: Paul Brown Stadium

Results
- Record: 4–12
- Division place: 4th AFC North
- Playoffs: Did not qualify
- Pro Bowlers: None

Uniform
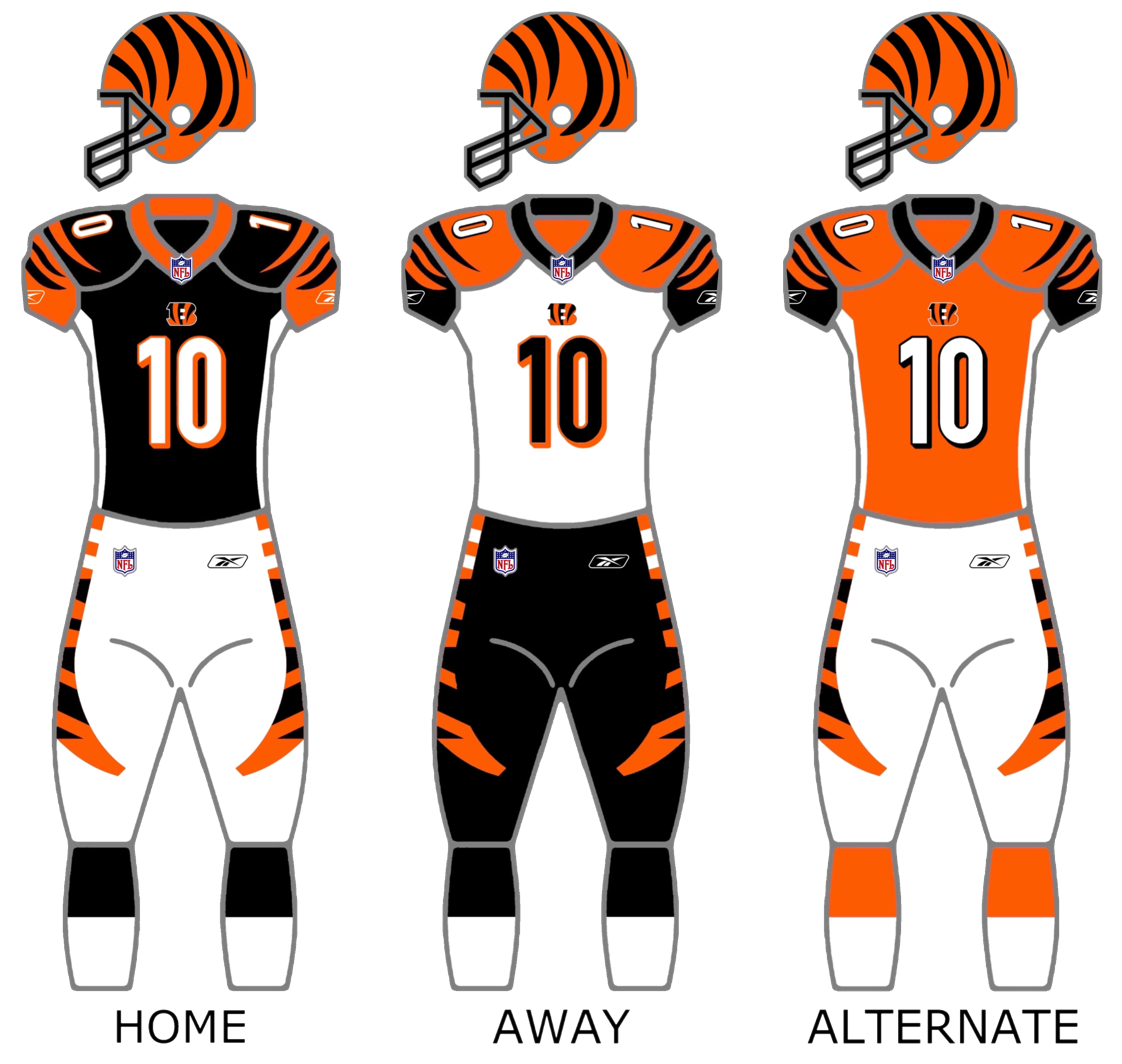

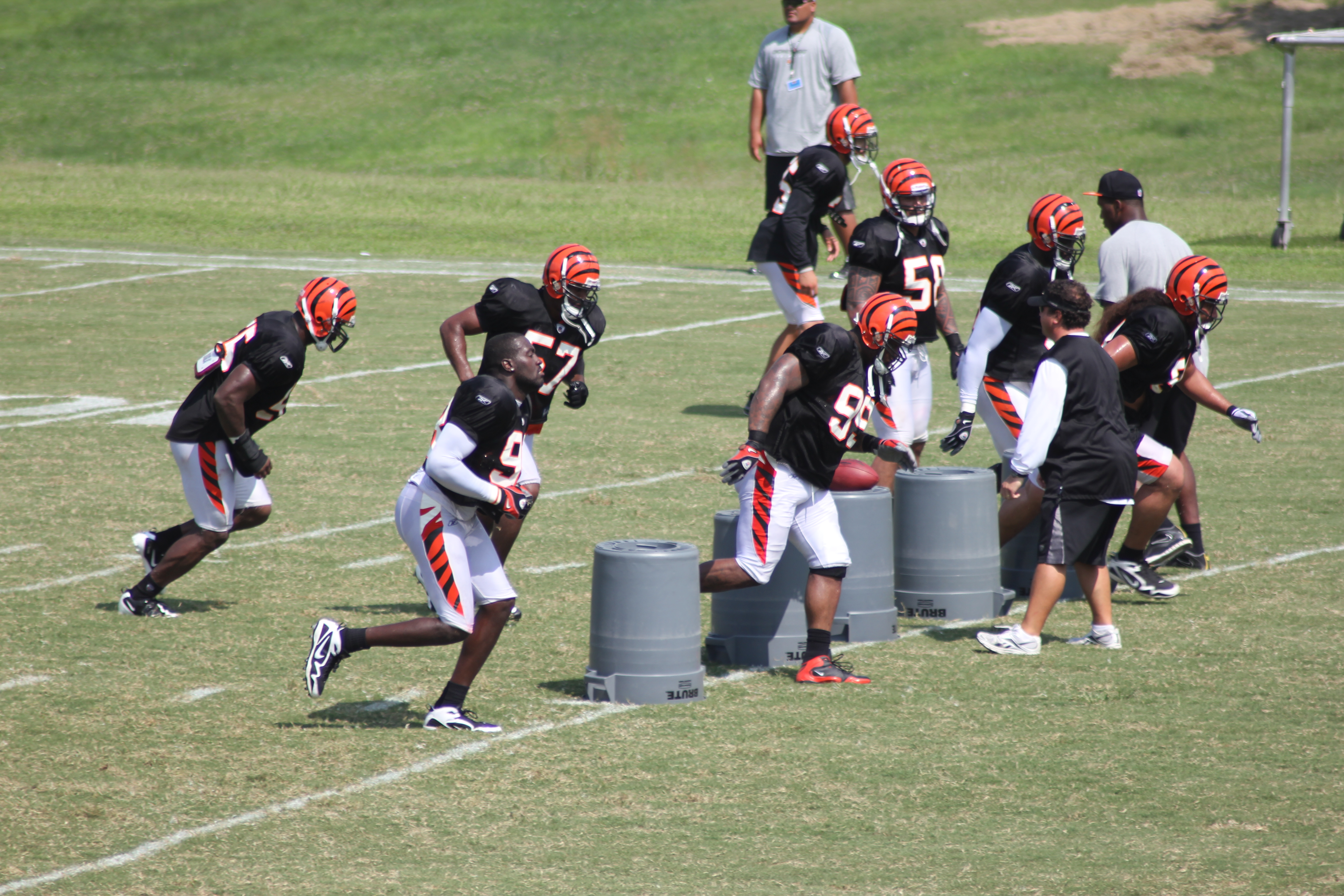
The Bengals defense during training camp in August 2010

The 2010 season was the Cincinnati Bengals' 41st in the National Football League (NFL) and their 43rd overall. The Bengals finished in last place in the AFC North with a 4–12 record and missed the playoffs, a marked regression from their 10–6 record in 2009, when they swept the division for the first time in team history and made the playoffs as division champions. This was the Bengals' first last place finish in the division since 2002. This would be the only time the Bengals played on Thanksgiving until 2025.

== Offseason ==
=== 2010 Draft ===
2010 Cincinnati Bengals draft
Round	Pick	Player	Position	College	Notes
1	21	Jermaine Gresham *	TE	Oklahoma	
2	54	Carlos Dunlap *	DE	Florida	
3	84	Jordan Shipley	WR	Texas	
3	96	Brandon Ghee	DB	Wake Forest	
4	120	Geno Atkins *	DT	Georgia	
4	131	Roddrick Muckelroy	LB	Texas	
5	152	Otis Hudson	T	Eastern Illinois	
6	191	Dezmon Briscoe	WR	Kansas	
7	228	Reggie Stephens	C	Iowa State	
Made roster * Made at least one Pro Bowl during career

== Staff ==
Cincinnati Bengals 2010 staff
Front office: Principal owner/president/general manager – Mike Brown; Executive vice president – Katie Blackburn; Senior vice president of player personnel – Pete Brown; Vice president of player personnel – Paul H. Brown; Director of football operations – Jim Lippincott; Director of player personnel – Duke Tobin; Head coaches: Head coach – Marvin Lewis; Assistant head coach/offensive line – Paul Alexander; Offensive coaches: Offensive coordinator – Bob Bratkowski; Quarterbacks – Ken Zampese; Running backs – Jim Anderson; Wide receivers – Mike Sheppard; Tight ends – Jonathan Hayes; Offensive quality control – Kyle Caskey	Defensive coaches: Defensive coordinator – Mike Zimmer; Defensive line – Jay Hayes; Linebackers – Jeff FitzGerald; Defensive backs – Kevin Coyle; Assistant defensive backs – Louie Cioffi; Special teams coaches: Special teams – Darrin Simmons; Assistant special teams/assistant linebackers – Paul Guenther; Strength and conditioning: Strength and conditioning – Chip Morton; Assistant strength and conditioning – Jeff Friday; Coaching assistants: Brayden Coombs; David Lippincott

== Roster ==
2010 Cincinnati Bengals roster
Quarterbacks (QB): 8 Dan LeFevour; 9 Carson Palmer; 5 Jordan Palmer; Running backs (RB): 32 Cedric Benson; 30 Cedric Peerman; 36 Chris Pressley FB; 28 Bernard Scott KR; Wide receivers (WR): 87 Andre Caldwell; 12 Quan Cosby PR; 17 Shay Hodge; 85 Chad Ochocinco; 11 Jordan Shipley; 89 Jerome Simpson; Tight ends (TE): 80 Chase Coffman; 84 Jermaine Gresham; 82 Reggie Kelly; 86 Garrett Mills	Offensive linemen (OL): 72 Kirk Chambers T; 73 Anthony Collins T; 64 Kyle Cook C; 62 Nate Livings G; 66 Evan Mathis G; 74 Dennis Roland T; 61 Reggie Stephens C; 77 Andrew Whitworth T; 63 Bobbie Williams G; Defensive linemen (DL): 95 Victor Adeyanju DE; 97 Geno Atkins DT; 96 Carlos Dunlap DE; 91 Robert Geathers DE; 93 Michael Johnson DE; 69 Clinton McDonald DT/DE; 94 Domata Peko DT; 90 Pat Sims DT	Linebackers (LB): 59 Brandon Johnson OLB; 57 Dhani Jones MLB; 58 Rey Maualuga OLB; 56 Roddrick Muckelroy MLB; 53 Vincent Rey OLB; 55 Keith Rivers OLB; 51 Dan Skuta OLB; Defensive backs (DB): 23 Fred Bennett CB; 29 Leon Hall CB; 22 Johnathan Joseph CB; 45 Jeromy Miles SS; 20 Reggie Nelson S; 34 Keiwan Ratliff CB; 26 Jonathan Wade CB; 47 Marvin White FS; 31 Roy Williams SS; Special teams (ST): 46 Clark Harris LS; 10 Kevin Huber P; 3 Clint Stitser K	Practice squad: 35 James Develin FB; 75 Andrew Gardner T; 33 Cary Harris S; 60 Otis Hudson G; 52 Tim Knicky LB; 67 James Ruffin DE; Reserve: 42 Chris Crocker FS (IR); 68 Jonathan Fanene DE (IR); 21 Brandon Ghee CB (IR); 99 Tank Johnson DT (IR); 24 Adam Jones CB (IR); 40 Brian Leonard (IR); 76 Andrew Mitchell T (IR); 44 Rico Murray CB (IR); 41 Chinedum Ndukwe S (IR); 43 Tom Nelson FS (NF-Inj.); 2 Mike Nugent K (IR); 98 Antwan Odom DE (IR); 81 Terrell Owens WR (IR); 39 David Pender CB (Exempt); 92 Frostee Rucker DE (IR); 70 Jason Shirley G (NF-Inj.); 71 Andre Smith T (IR); 25 Morgan Trent CB (IR); 37 Fui Vakapuna FB (IR); 27 Gibril Wilson SS (IR); Rookies in italics 53 active, 20 reserve, 6 practice squad

== Schedule ==
=== Preseason ===
On February 24, 2010, the NFL announced that the Bengals will face the Dallas Cowboys in the Pro Football Hall of Fame Game at Fawcett Stadium in Canton, Ohio. The game occurred on Sunday, August 8, 2010, and was aired by NBC. The Bengals were the designated home team.

The Bengals' preseason opponents were announced on March 31, 2010. The finalized dates and times were announced on April 9, 2010.

Week	Date	Opponent	Result	Record	Venue	Recap
HOF	August 8	vs. Dallas Cowboys	**L** 7–16	0–1	Fawcett Stadium (Canton)	Recap
1	August 15	Denver Broncos	**W** 33–24	1–1	Paul Brown Stadium	Recap
2	August 20	Philadelphia Eagles	**W** 22–9	2–1	Paul Brown Stadium	Recap
3	August 28	at Buffalo Bills	**L** 20–35	2–2	Ralph Wilson Stadium	Recap
4	September 2	at Indianapolis Colts	**W** 30–28	3–2	Lucas Oil Stadium	Recap

=== Regular season ===
Week	Date	Opponent	Result	Record	Venue	Recap
1	September 12	at New England Patriots	**L** 24–38	0–1	Gillette Stadium	Recap
2	September 19	**Baltimore Ravens**	**W** 15–10	1–1	Paul Brown Stadium	Recap
3	September 26	at Carolina Panthers	**W** 20–7	2–1	Bank of America Stadium	Recap
4	October 3	at **Cleveland Browns**	**L** 20–23	2–2	Cleveland Browns Stadium	Recap
5	October 10	Tampa Bay Buccaneers	**L** 21–24	2–3	Paul Brown Stadium	Recap
6	Bye					
7	October 24	at Atlanta Falcons	**L** 32–39	2–4	Georgia Dome	Recap
8	October 31	Miami Dolphins	**L** 14–22	2–5	Paul Brown Stadium	Recap
9	November 8	**Pittsburgh Steelers**	**L** 21–27	2–6	Paul Brown Stadium	Recap
10	November 14	at Indianapolis Colts	**L** 17–23	2–7	Lucas Oil Stadium	Recap
11	November 21	Buffalo Bills	**L** 31–49	2–8	Paul Brown Stadium	Recap
12	November 25	at New York Jets	**L** 10–26	2–9	New Meadowlands Stadium	Recap
13	December 5	New Orleans Saints	**L** 30–34	2–10	Paul Brown Stadium	Recap
14	December 12	at **Pittsburgh Steelers**	**L** 7–23	2–11	Heinz Field	Recap
15	December 19	**Cleveland Browns**	**W** 19–17	3–11	Paul Brown Stadium	Recap
16	December 26	San Diego Chargers	**W** 34–20	4–11	Paul Brown Stadium	Recap
17	January 2	at **Baltimore Ravens**	**L** 7–13	4–12	M&T Bank Stadium	Recap

Note: Intra-division opponents are in bold text.

== Standings ==
AFC North
	W	L	T	PCT	DIV	CONF	PF	PA	STK
^{(2)} Pittsburgh Steelers	12	4	0	.750	5–1	9–3	375	232	W2
^{(5)} Baltimore Ravens	12	4	0	.750	4–2	9–3	357	270	W4
Cleveland Browns	5	11	0	.313	1–5	3–9	271	332	L4
Cincinnati Bengals	4	12	0	.250	2–4	3–9	322	395	L1

== Preseason results ==
Pro Football Hall of Fame Game – vs Dallas Cowboys

Quarter	1	2	3	4	Total
Cowboys	3	3	3	7	16
Bengals	0	0	0	7	7

at Fawcett Stadium, Canton, Ohio

- Date: August 8
- Game weather: 80 °F (27 °C), sunny
- Game attendance: 22,364
- TV: NBC
- Recap

Game information

First Quarter-

- Dal- D. Buehler 20-yard field goal (14 plays, 63 yards; 5:35)

Second Quarter-

- Dal- D.Buehler 34 yd. Field Goal (8 plays, 39 yards; 4:23)

Third Quarter-

- Dal- D.Buehler 23 yd. Field Goal (4 plays, 3 yards; 0:47)

Fourth Quarter-

- Dal- B. Sharpe 6 yd. interception return (D.Buehler kick)
- Cin- D. Hill 1-yard pass from J. Palmer (D. Rayner kick) (2 plays, 2 yards; 0:43)

Game leaders

- Passing: J. Palmer (CIN)- 10/20 102 yards, 1 TD, 2 INT
- Rushing: B. Scott (CIN)- 7 ATT 19 yards, 0 TD
- Receiving: M. Jones (CIN)- 3 REC 42 yards, 0 TD

Preseason Week 1 – vs Denver Broncos

Quarter	1	2	3	4	Total
Broncos	14	3	0	7	24
Bengals	0	17	6	10	33

at Paul Brown Stadium, Cincinnati, Ohio

- Date: August 15
- Game weather: 78 °F (26 °C), partly cloudy
- Game attendance: 51,278
- Recap

Preseason Week 2 – vs Philadelphia Eagles

Quarter	1	2	3	4	Total
Eagles	0	6	3	0	9
Bengals	0	7	0	15	22

at Paul Brown Stadium, Cincinnati, Ohio

- Date: August 20
- Game weather: 83 °F (28 °C), fair
- Game attendance: 55,702
- Recap

== Regular season results ==
=== Week 1: at New England Patriots ===
Week 1: Cincinnati Bengals at New England Patriots – Game summary

Quarter	1	2	3	4	Total
Bengals	0	3	14	7	24
Patriots	10	14	7	7	38

at Gillette Stadium, Foxborough, Massachusetts

- Date: September 12
- Game time: 1:00 p.m. EDT
- Game weather: 62 °F (17 °C) (Cloudy)
- Game attendance: 68,756
- Referee: Carl Cheffers
- TV announcers (CBS): Jim Nantz and Phil Simms
- http://www.nfl.com/gamecenter/2010091202/2010/REG1/bengals@patriots

Game information

First quarter

- NE – Wes Welker 9-yard pass from Tom Brady (Stephen Gostkowski kick), Patriots 7–0, Drive: 5 plays, 72 yards, 2:51.
- NE – Stephen Gostkowski 32-yard field goal, Patriots 10–0, Drive: 11 plays, 56 yards, 5:30.

Second quarter

- NE – Wes Welker 4-yard pass from Tom Brady, (Stephen Gostkowski kick), Patriots 17–0, Drive: 10 plays, 80 yards, 4:01.
- NE – Gary Guyton 59-yard interception return (Stephen Gostkowski kick), Patriots 24–0.
- CIN – Mike Nugent 54-yard field goal, Patriots 24–3, Drive: 12 plays, 37 yards, 4:24.

Third quarter

- NE – Brandon Tate 97-yard kickoff return (Stephen Gostkowski kick), Patriots 31–3, Drive: 0 plays, 0 yards, 0:12.
- CIN – Jermaine Gresham 1-yard pass from Carson Palmer (Mike Nugent kick), Patriots 31–10, Drive: 12 plays, 80 yards, 6:54.
- CIN – Chad Ochocinco 28-yard pass from Carson Palmer (Mike Nugent kick), Patriots 31–17, Drive: 12 plays, 73 yards, 4:51.

Fourth quarter

- NE – Rob Gronkowski 1-yard pass from Tom Brady (Stephen Gostkowski kick), Patriots 38–17, Drive: 14 plays, 81 yards, 7:41.
- CIN – Cedric Benson 1-yard run (Mike Nugent kick), Patriots 38–24, Drive: 14 plays, 76 yards, 3:44.

Top passers

- CIN – Carson Palmer – 34/50, 345 yards, 2 touchdowns, 1 interception
- NE – Tom Brady – 25/35, 258 yards, 3 touchdowns

Top rushers

- CIN – Cedric Benson – 15 rushes, 43 yards, 1 touchdown
- NE – Fred Taylor – 14 rushes, 71 yards

Top receivers

- CIN – Chad Ochocinco – 12 receptions, 159 yards, 1 touchdown
- NE – Wes Welker – 8 receptions, 64 yards, 2 touchdowns

Top tacklers

- CIN – Keith Rivers – 7 tackles, 3 assists
- NE – Pat Chung – 12 tackles, 4 assists

The Cincinnati Bengals began their season at Gillette Stadium for an AFC duel with the New England Patriots. In the first quarter, the Bengals trailed early when Patriots quarterback Tom Brady got a 9-yard TD pass to wide receiver Wes Welker, followed by kicker Stephen Gostkowski hitting a 32-yard field goal. In the second quarter, the Bengals struggled further when Brady made a 4-yard TD pass to Wes Welker, followed by linebacker Gary Guyton returning an interception 59 yards for a touchdown. Then, the Bengals made their first score of the half when kicker Mike Nugent nailed a 54-yard field goal.

In the third quarter, the Patriots increased their lead when wide receiver Brandon Tate returned the second half's opening kickoff 97 yards for a touchdown. After that, the Bengals replied with quarterback Carson Palmer making a 1-yard TD pass to tight end Jermaine Gresham, followed by Palmer's 28-yard touchdown pass to wide receiver Chad Ochocinco. In the fourth quarter, the Patriots scored again with Brady making a 1-yard TD pass to tight end Rob Gronkowski. The Bengals replied with running back Cedric Benson making a 1-yard TD run, but Cincinnati couldn't get any closer to New England's lead.

With the loss, the Bengals began their season at 0–1.

=== Week 2: vs. Baltimore Ravens ===
Week 2: Baltimore Ravens at Cincinnati Bengals – Game summary

Quarter	1	2	3	4	Total
Ravens	0	0	7	3	10
Bengals	0	6	3	6	15

at Paul Brown Stadium, Cincinnati, Ohio

- Date: September 19
- Game time: 1:00 pm. EDT
- Game weather: 78 °F (26 °C) (Cloudy)
- Game attendance: 64,071
- Referee: Gene Steratore
- TV announcers (CBS): Bill Macatee and Rich Gannon
- Recap, Gamebook

Game information

First quarter

Second quarter

- CIN – Mike Nugent 36-yard field goal, Bengals 3–0, Drive: 13 plays, 54 yards, 6:14.
- CIN – Mike Nugent 30-yard field goal, Bengals 6–0, Drive: 6 plays, 23 yards, 3:35.

Third quarter

- BAL – Derrick Mason 31-yard pass from Joe Flacco (Billy Cundiff kick), Ravens 7–6, Drive: 7 plays, 80 yards, 3:14.
- CIN – Mike Nugent 46-yard field goal, Bengals 9–7, Drive: 13 plays, 34 yards, 5:09.

Fourth quarter

- BAL – Billy Cundiff 38-yard field goal, Ravens 10–9, Drive: 8 plays, 52 yards, 3:49.
- CIN – Mike Nugent 38-yard field goal, Bengals 12–10, Drive: 4 plays, 21 yards, 1:12.
- CIN – Mike Nugent 25-yard field goal, Bengals 15–10, Drive: 4 plays, 4 yards, 1:31.

Top passers

- BAL – Joe Flacco – 17/39, 154 yards, 1 touchdown, 4 interceptions
- CIN – Carson Palmer – 16/35, 167 yards

Top rushers

- BAL – Ray Rice – 16 rushes, 87 yards
- CIN – Cedric Benson – 23 rushes, 78 yards

Top receivers

- BAL – Anquan Boldin – 5 receptions, 35 yards
- CIN – Terrell Owens – 3 receptions, 57 yards

Top tacklers

- BAL – Chris Carr – 6 tackles – 1 assist
- CIN – Chris Crocker – 4 tackles – 3 assist

Hoping to rebound from their loss to the Patriots the Bengals played on home ground for an AFC North rivalry match against the Ravens. In the 2nd quarter Cincinnati took the early lead as kicker Mike Nugent hit a 36 and a 30-yard field goal. In the third quarter the Ravens replied and took the lead with QB Joe Flacco completing a 31-yard TD pass to WR Derrick Mason. The Bengals replied when Nugent hit a 46-yard field goal. The Bengals fell behind again in the fourth quarter when kicker Billy Cundiff made a 38-yard field goal, but they got the win with Nugent making 38 and a 25-yard field goals.

With the win, the Bengals improved to 1–1 and picked up their 8th straight division victory.

=== Week 3: at Carolina Panthers ===
Week 3: Cincinnati Bengals at Carolina Panthers – Game summary

Quarter	1	2	3	4	Total
Bengals	7	3	0	10	20
Panthers	0	0	7	0	7

at Bank of America Stadium, Charlotte, North Carolina

- Date: September 26
- Game time: 1:00 pm. EDT
- Game weather: 67 °F (19 °C) (Showers)
- Game attendance: 72,887
- Referee: Pete Morelli
- TV announcers (CBS): Bill Macatee and Rich Gannon
- Recap

Game information

First quarter

- CIN – Cedric Benson 1-yard run (Mike Nugent kick), Bengals 7–0, Drive: 8 plays, 53 yards, 4:33.

Second quarter

- CIN – Mike Nugent 33-yard field goal, Bengals 10–0, Drive: 9 plays, 27 yards, 4:13.

Third quarter

- CAR – Jonathan Stewart 1-yard run (John Kasay kick), Bengals 10–7, Drive: 8 plays, 75 yards, 3:23.

Fourth quarter

- CIN – Mike Nugent 50-yard field goal, Bengals 13–7, Drive: 7 plays, 18 yards, 2:51.
- CIN – Cedric Benson 7-yard pass from Carson Palmer, Bengals 20–7, Drive: 3 plays, 37 yards, 0:53.

Top passers

- CIN – Carson Palmer – 19/37, 195 yards, 1 touchdown, 2 interceptions
- CAR – Jimmy Clausen – 16/33, 188 yards, 1 interception

Top rushers

- CIN – Cedric Benson – 27 rushes, 81 yards, 1 touchdown
- CAR – DeAngelo Williams – 10 rushes, 64 yards

Top receivers

- CIN – Jermaine Gresham – 4 receptions, 59 yards
- CAR – Mike Goodson – 4 receptions, 47 yards

Top tacklers

- CIN – Rey Maualuga – 4 tackles, 2 assists
- CAR – Charles Godfrey – 9 tackles, 2 assists, 1 interception

Coming off their divisional home win over the Ravens, the Bengals flew to Bank of America Stadium for a Week 3 interconference duel with the Carolina Panthers. Cincinnati would strike first in the opening half as running back Cedric Benson got a 1-yard touchdown run in the first quarter, while kicker Mike Nugent got a 33-yard field goal. The Panthers would answer in the third quarter as running back Jonathan Stewart got a 1-yard touchdown run, yet the Bengals would close out the game in the fourth quarter as Nugent nailed a 50-yard field goal, followed by quarterback Carson Palmer finding Benson on a 7-yard touchdown pass.

With the win, Cincinnati improved to 2–1.

=== Week 4: at Cleveland Browns ===
Week 4: Cincinnati Bengals at Cleveland Browns – Game summary

Quarter	1	2	3	4	Total
Bengals	0	10	3	7	20
Browns	3	10	10	0	23

at Cleveland Browns Stadium, Cleveland, Ohio

- Date: October 3
- Game time: 1:00 pm. EDT
- Game weather: 50 °F (10 °C) (Cloudy)
- Game attendance: 66,731
- Referee: Jerome Boger
- TV announcers (CBS): Bill Macatee and Rich Gannon
- Recap

Game information

First quarter

- CLE – Phil Dawson 30-yard field goal, Browns 3–0, Drive: 9 plays, 39 yards, 3:20.

Second quarter

- CLE – Evan Moore 24-yard pass from Seneca Wallace (Phil Dawson kick), Browns 10–0, Drive: 8 plays, 87 yards, 4:45.
- CIN – Mike Nugent 24-yard field goal, Browns 10–3, Drive: 8 plays,61 yards, 3:48.
- CIN – Terrell Owens 78-yard pass from Carson Palmer (Mike Nugent kick), Tied 10–10, Drive: 2 plays, 75 yards, 0:59.
- CLE – Phil Dawson 31-yard field goal, Browns 13–10, Drive: 8 plays, 53 yards, 1:31.

Third quarter

- CLE – Peyton Hillis 1-yard run (Phil Dawson kick), Browns 20–10, Drive: 11 plays, 64 yards, 6:06.
- CLE – Phil Dawson 22-yard field goal, Browns 23–10, Drive: 4 plays, 8 yards, 1:32.
- CIN – Mike Nugent 25-yard field goal, Browns 23–13, Drive: 10 plays, 76 yards, 5:18.

Fourth quarter

- CIN – Brian Leonard 3-yard pass from Carson Palmer (Mike Nugent kick), Browns 23–20, Drive: 9 plays, 80 yards, 4:05.

Top passers

- CIN – Carson Palmer – 25/36, 371 yards, 2 touchdowns
- CLE – Seneca Wallace – 18/30, 184 yards, 1 touchdown, 1 interception

Top rushers

- CIN – Cedric Benson – 15 rushes, 60 yards
- CLE – Peyton Hillis – 27 rushes, 102 yards, 1 touchdown

Top receivers

- CIN – Terrell Owens – 10 receptions, 222 yards, 1 touchdown
- CLE – Benjamin Watson – 6 receptions, 60 yards

Top tacklers

- CIN – Keith Rivers – 8 tackles, 1 assist, 1 sack
- CLE – T. J. Ward – 5 tackles, 3 assists

Coming off their road win over the Panthers, the Bengals flew to Cleveland Browns Stadium for their Week 4 AFC North duel with the Cleveland Browns in Round 1 of 2010's Battle of Ohio. Cincinnati would trail early in the first quarter as Browns kicker Phil Dawson made a 30-yard field goal. Cleveland would add onto their lead in the second quarter as quarterback Seneca Wallace completed a 24-yard touchdown pass to tight end Evan Moore. Afterwards, the Bengals tied the game as kicker Mike Nugent got a 24-yard field goal, followed by quarterback Carson Palmer completing a 78-yard touchdown pass to wide receiver Terrell Owens. The Browns would close out the half with Dawson getting a 31-yard field goal.

In the third quarter, Cleveland responded with running back Peyton Hillis' 1-yard touchdown run, followed by Dawson nailing a 22-yard field goal. Afterwards, Cincinnati came right back with Nugent's 25-yard field goal. The Bengals tried to rally in the fourth quarter as Palmer found running back Brian Leonard on a 3-yard touchdown pass, but the Browns' defense would prevent any further progress.

With the loss, not only did Cincinnati fall to 2–2. The Browns also improve to 1–3 and prevented the Bengals from a 9th straight division rival win.

=== Week 5: vs. Tampa Bay Buccaneers ===
Week 5: Tampa Bay Buccaneers at Cincinnati Bengals – Game summary

Quarter	1	2	3	4	Total
Buccaneers	0	7	7	10	24
Bengals	7	3	3	8	21

at Paul Brown Stadium, Cincinnati, Ohio

- Date: October 10
- Game time: 1:00 pm. EDT
- Game weather: 81 °F (27 °C) (Sunny)
- Game attendance: 63,888
- Referee: Scott Green
- TV announcers (Fox): Thom Brennaman, Brian Billick and Charissa Thompson
- Recap

Game information

First quarter

- CIN – Terrell Owens 43-yard pass from Carson Palmer (Mike Nugent kick), Bengals 7–0, Drive: 3 plays, 55 yards, 1:02.

Second quarter

- TB – Cody Grimm 11-yard interception return (Connor Barth kick), Tied 7–7.
- CIN – Mike Nugent 31-yard field goal, Bengals 10–7, Drive: 10 plays, 69 yards, 2:19.

Third quarter

- TB – Earnest Graham 1-yard run (Connor Barth kick), Buccaneers 14–10, Drive: 9 plays, 80 yards, 5:10.
- CIN – Mike Nugent 35-yard field goal, Buccaneers 14–13, Drive: 9 plays, 55 yards, 3:59.

Fourth quarter

- CIN – Jermaine Gresham 1-yard pass from Carson Palmer (Cedric Benson run), Bengals 21–14, Drive: 7 plays, 29 yards, 4:12.
- TB – Mike Williams 20-yard pass from Josh Freeman (Connor Barth kick), Tied 21–21, Drive: 5 plays, 50 yards, 0:52.
- TB – Connor Barth 31-yard field goal, Buccaneers 24–21, Drive: 2 plays, 21 yards, 0:13.

Top passers

- TB – Josh Freeman – 20/33, 280 yards, 1 touchdown, 1 interception
- CIN – Carson Palmer – 21/36, 209 yards, 2 touchdowns, 3 interceptions

Top rushers

- TB – Earnest Graham – 3 rushes, 65 yards, 1 touchdown
- CIN – Cedric Benson – 23 rushes, 144 yards

Top receivers

- TB – Mike Williams – 7 receptions, 99 yards, 1 touchdown
- CIN – Terrell Owens – 7 receptions, 102 yards, 1 touchdown

Top tacklers

- TB – Sabby Piscitelli – 7 tackles, 1 interception
- CIN – Chris Crocker – 8 tackles, 1 assist, 2 sacks, 1 forced fumble

The Bengals' 5th game was an Interconference duel with the Buccaneers at home. In the 1st quarter Cincinnati took the early lead as QB Carson Palmer made a 43-yard TD pass to WR Terrell Owens. The Buccaneers replied in the 2nd quarter with FS Cody Grimm returning an interception 11 yards for a touchdown. Then kicker Mike Nugent made a 31-yard field goal to put the Bengals up 10–7. In the 3rd quarter the Bengals fell behind as FB Earnest Graham made a 1-yard TD run; but they replied with Nugent making a 35-yard field goal. The Bengals took the lead with Palmer finding TE Jermaine Gresham on a 1-yard TD pass (With a successful 2-point conversion as RB Cedric Benson ran to the endzone), but the lead didn't last very long as QB Josh Freeman completed a 20-yard TD pass to WR Mike Williams. The decision was made when kicker Connor Barth made a 31-yard field goal to give the Bengals another loss.

With the loss, the Bengals went into their bye week at 2–3.

=== Week 7: at Atlanta Falcons ===
Week 7: Cincinnati Bengals at Atlanta Falcons – Game summary

Quarter	1	2	3	4	Total
Bengals	3	0	22	7	32
Falcons	7	17	0	15	39

at Georgia Dome, Atlanta, Georgia

- Date: October 24
- Game time: 1:00 pm. EDT
- Game weather: None (dome stadium)
- Game attendance: 67,665
- Referee: Alberto Riveron
- TV announcers (CBS): Gus Johnson and Steve Tasker
- Recap

Game information

First quarter

- ATL – Brian Finneran 3-yard pass from Matt Ryan (Matt Bryant kick), Falcons 7–0, Drive: 8 plays, 83 yards, 4:50.
- CIN – Mike Nugent 20-yard field goal, Falcons 7–3, Drive: 9 plays, 58 yards, 4:24.

Second quarter

- ATL – Matt Bryant 45-yard field goal, Falcons 10–3, Drive: 7 plays, 54 yards, 1:52.
- ATL – Roddy White 11-yard pass from Matt Ryan (Matt Bryant kick), Falcons 17–3, Drive: 5 plays, 79 yards, 1:52.
- ATL – Michael Turner 2-yard run (Matt Bryant kick) Falcons 24–3, Drive: 11 plays, 83 yards, 5:31.

Third quarter

- CIN – Mike Nugent 33-yard field goal, Falcons 24–6, Drive: 11 plays, 59 yards, 5:26.
- CIN – Terrell Owens 19-yard pass from Carson Palmer (Mike Nugent kick), Falcons 24–13, Drive: 6 plays, 88 yards, 3:18.
- CIN – Jordan Shipley 64-yard pass from Carson Palmer (pass failed), Falcons 24–19, Drive: 3 plays, 62 yards, 1:19.
- CIN – Adam Jones 59 fumble return (pass failed), Bengals 25–24.

Fourth quarter

- ATL – Roddy White 11-yard pass from Matt Ryan (Matt Ryan – Roddy White pass), Falcons 32–25, Drive: 8 plays, 74 yards, 3:14.
- ATL – Michael Turner 3-yard run (Matt Bryant kick), Falcons 39–25, Drive: 10 plays, 48 yards, 5:04.
- CIN – Chad Ochocinco 8-yard pass from Carson Palmer (Mike Nugent kick), Falcons 39–32, Drive: 11 plays, 86 yards, 3:00.

Top passers

- CIN – Carson Palmer – 36/50, 412 yards, 3 touchdowns
- ATL – Matt Ryan – 24/33, 299 yards, 3 touchdowns, 1 interceptions

Top rushers

- CIN – Cedric Benson – 20 rushes, 70 yards
- ATL – Michael Turner – 23 rushes, 121 yards, 2 touchdowns

Top receivers

- CIN – Jordan Shipley – 6 receptions, 131 yards, 1 touchdowns
- ATL – Roddy White – 11 receptions, 201 yards, 2 touchdowns

Top tacklers

- CIN – Dhani Jones – 7 tackles, 1 assist
- ATL – Chris Owens – 10 tackles, 1 assist

Coming off their bye week the Bengals played at Georgia Dome for an interconference duel with the Falcons. In the first quarter the Bengals trailed early as QB Matt Ryan made a 3-yard TD pass to WR Brian Finneran. But they replied with kicker Mike Nugent making a 20-yard field goal. The Bengals struggled in the second quarter with kicker Matt Bryant hitting a 45-yard field goal. Then Ryan found WR Roddy White on a 43-yard TD pass, followed by RB Michael Turner getting a 2-yard TD run. The Bengals took control in the third quarter with Nugent nailing a 33-yard field goal, followed by QB Carson Palmer completing a 19-yard TD pass to WR Terrell Owens. Then Palmer found WR Jordan Shipley on a 64-yard TD pass. Then DB Adam Jones returned a fumble 59 yards to the endzone for a touchdown (With a failed two-point conversion). The Falcons pulled away in the fourth quarter with Ryan making an 11-yard TD pass to White. (With the 2-point conversion successful as Ryan passed to White) This was followed by Turner getting a 3-yard TD run. The Bengals tried to tie the game, but only came away with one touchdown after Palmer found WR Chad Ochocinco on an 8-yard TD pass.

With the loss, the Bengals fell to 2–4.

=== Week 8: vs. Miami Dolphins ===
Week 8: Miami Dolphins at Cincinnati Bengals – Game summary

Quarter	1	2	3	4	Total
Dolphins	3	9	3	7	22
Bengals	7	7	0	0	14

at Paul Brown Stadium, Cincinnati, Ohio

- Date: October 31
- Game time: 1:00 pm. EDT
- Game weather: 54 °F (12 °C) (Sunny)
- Game attendance: 63,179
- Referee: Terry McAulay
- TV announcers (CBS): Kevin Harlan and Solomon Wilcots
- Recap

Game information

First quarter

- CIN – Terrell Owens 7-yard pass from Carson Palmer (Mike Nugent kick), Bengals 7–0, Drive: 15 plays, 86 yards, 7:40.
- MIA – Dan Carpenter 38-yard field goal, Bengals 7–3, Drive: 11 plays, 50 yards, 5:04.

Second quarter

- MIA – Dan Carpenter 42-yard field goal, Bengals 7–6, Drive: 10 plays, 55 yards, 5:17.
- CIN – Terrell Owens 37-yard pass from Carson Palmer (Mike Nugent kick), Bengals 14–6, Drive: 1 plays, 37 yards, 0:07.
- MIA – Dan Carpenter 24-yard field goal, Bengals 14–9, Drive: 7 plays, 39 yards, 1:51.
- MIA – Dan Carpenter 54-yard field goal, Bengals 14–12, Drive: 4 plays, 13 yards, 0:21.

Third quarter

- MIA – Dan Carpenter 31-yard field goal, Dolphins 15–14, Drive: 15 plays, 81 yards, 7:29.

Fourth quarter

- MIA – Ricky Williams 1-yard run (Dan Carpenter kick), Dolphins 22–14, Drive: 6 plays, 96 yards, 2:49.

Top passers

- MIA – Chad Henne – 24/37, 217 yards, 1 interception
- CIN – Carson Palmer – 17/38, 156 yards, 2 touchdowns, 1 interception

Top rushers

- MIA – Ronnie Brown – 16 rushes, 61 yards
- CIN – Cedric Benson – 20 rushes, 69 yards

Top receivers

- MIA – Brandon Marshall – 5 receptions, 64 yards
- CIN – Terrell Owens – 5 receptions, 65 yards, 2 touchdowns

Top tacklers

- MIA – Yeremiah Bell – 6 tackles, 3 assists
- CIN – Morgan Trent – 9 tackles, 2 assists, 1 interception

Hoping to break their current losing streak the Bengals played on home ground for an AFC duel with the Dolphins. In the first quarter the Bengals took the lead as QB Carson Palmer got a 7-yard TD pass to WR Terrell Owens. The Dolphins replied with kicker Dan Carpenter hitting a 38 and a 42-yard field goal. The Bengals increased their lead with Palmer finding Owens again on a 37-yard TD pass. The Dolphins caught up and eventually took the lead with Carpenter hitting a 24, 54, and a 31-yard field goal in the third quarter to put the Dolphins up 15–14. The Bengals fell further behind with RB Ricky Williams making a 1-yard TD run.

With the loss, the Bengals fell to 2–5.

=== Week 9: vs. Pittsburgh Steelers ===
Week 9: Pittsburgh Steelers at Cincinnati Bengals – Game summary

Quarter	1	2	3	4	Total
Steelers	10	10	0	7	27
Bengals	0	7	0	14	21

at Paul Brown Stadium, Cincinnati, Ohio

- Date: November 8
- Game time: 8:30 pm. EST
- Game weather: 44 °F (7 °C) (Clear)
- Game attendance: 65,626
- Referee: Ron Winter
- TV announcers (ESPN): Mike Tirico, Ron Jaworski, Jon Gruden and Suzy Kolber
- Recap

Game information

First quarter

- PIT – Rashard Mendenhall 1-yard run (Jeff Reed kick), Steelers 7–0, Drive: 4 plays, 25 yards, 1:55.
- PIT – Jeff Reed 25-yard field goal, Steelers 10–0, Drive: 6 plays, 23 yards, 2:17.

Second quarter

- CIN – Terrell Owens 19-yard pass from Carson Palmer (Mike Nugent kick), Steelers 10–7, Drive: 4 plays, 38 yards, 2:05.
- PIT – Hines Ward 8-yard pass from Ben Roethlisberger (Jeff Reed kick), Steelers 17–7, Drive: 6 plays, 52 yards, 3:03.
- PIT – Jeff Reed 53-yard field goal, Steelers 20–7, Drive: 5 plays, 24 yards, 0:40.

Third quarter

Fourth quarter

- PIT – Mike Wallace 39-yard pass from Antwaan Randle El (Jeff Reed kick), Steelers 27–7, Drive: 5 plays, 56 yards, 2:40.
- CIN – Terrell Owens 27-yard pass from Carson Palmer (Mike Nugent kick), Steelers 27–14, Drive: 5 plays, 66 yards, 1:38.
- CIN – Cedric Benson 1-yard run (Mike Nugent kick), Steelers 27–21, Drive: 2 plays, 36 yards, 1:01.

Top passers

- PIT – Ben Roethlisberger – 17/27, 163 yards, 1 touchdown, 1 interception
- CIN – Carson Palmer – 22/36, 248 yards, 2 touchdowns, 1 interception

Top rushers

- PIT – Rashard Mendenhall – 22 rushes, 99 yards, 1 touchdown
- CIN – Cedric Benson – 18 rushes, 54 yards, 1 touchdown

Top receivers

- PIT – Mike Wallace – 5 receptions, 110 yards, 1 touchdown
- CIN – Terrell Owens – 10 receptions, 141 yards, 2 touchdowns

Top tacklers

- PIT – James Farrior – 9 tackles, 1 assist, 1 sack
- CIN – Dhani Jones – 6 tackles, 3 assists

Trying to snap a four-game losing streak, the Bengals stayed at home for a Week 9 AFC North duel with the Pittsburgh Steelers on Monday night. Cincinnati trailed early as Steelers running back Rashard Mendenhall got a 1-yard touchdown run, followed by kicker Jeff Reed getting a 25-yard field goal. The Bengals answered in the second quarter as quarterback Carson Palmer found wide receiver Terrell Owens on a 19-yard touchdown pass, but Pittsburgh responded with quarterback Ben Roethlisberger completing an 8-yard touchdown pass to wide receiver Hines Ward, followed by a 53-yard field goal from Reed. After a scoreless third quarter, Cincinnati's deficit increased as wide receiver Antwaan Randle El completed a 39-yard touchdown pass to wide receiver Mike Wallace. The Bengals tried to rally as Palmer hooked up with Owens again on a 27-yard touchdown pass, followed by a 1-yard touchdown run from running back Cedric Benson. However, the Steelers' defense held on to preserve the win.

With the loss, Cincinnati fell to 2–6 and matched their 2009 loss total.

=== Week 10: at Indianapolis Colts ===
Week 10: Cincinnati Bengals at Indianapolis Colts – Game summary

Quarter	1	2	3	4	Total
Bengals	0	10	0	7	17
Colts	10	10	0	3	23

at Lucas Oil Stadium, Indianapolis, Indiana

- Date: November 14
- Game time: 1:00 pm. EST
- Game weather: 46 °F (8 °C) (Sunny – retractable roof closed on turf)
- Game attendance: 67,404
- Referee: Walt Anderson
- TV announcers (CBS): Greg Gumbel and Dan Dierdorf
- Recap

Game information

First quarter

- IND – Adam Vinatieri 28-yard field goal, Colts 3–0, Drive: 14 plays, 82 yards, 6:25.
- IND – Kelvin Hayden 31-yard interception return (Adam Vinatieri kick), Colts 10–0.

Second quarter

- IND – Javarris James 3-yard run (Adam Vinatieri kick), Colts 17–0, Drive: 7 plays, 25 yards, 2:55.
- CIN – Mike Nugent 27-yard field goal, Colts 17–3, Drive: 8 plays, 55 yards, 4:28.
- CIN – Chad Ochocinco 5-yard pass from Carson Palmer (Mike Nugent kick), Colts 17–10, Drive: 9 plays, 85 yards, 5:00.
- IND – Adam Vinatieri 47-yard field goal, Colts 20–10, Drive: 10 plays, 54 yards, 1:06.

Third quarter

Fourth quarter

- IND – Adam Vinatieri 23-yard field goal, Colts 23–10, Drive: 4 plays, 5 yards, 1:12.
- CIN – Jermaine Gresham 19-yard pass from Carson Palmer (Mike Nugent kick), Colts 23–17, Drive: 8 plays, 73 yards, 2:10.

Top passers

- CIN – Carson Palmer – 31/42, 292 yards, 2 touchdowns, 3 interceptions
- IND – Peyton Manning – 20/36, 185 yards

Top rushers

- CIN – Brian Leonard – 1 rush, 42 yards
- IND – Donald Brown – 12 rushes, 50 yards

Top receivers

- CIN – Chad Ochocinco – 7 receptions, 86 yards, 1 touchdown
- IND – Jacob Tamme – 7 receptions, 73 yards

Top tacklers

- CIN – Dhani Jones – 12 tackles, 1 assist
- IND – Kelvin Hayden – 5 tackles, 4 assists, 1 interception

Trying to break a five-game losing streak the Bengals flew to Lucas Oil Stadium for an AFC duel with the Colts. In the first quarter the Bengals had problems when kicker Adam Vinatieri got a 28-yard field goal, followed by QB Carson Palmer's pass being intercepted by CB Kelvin Hayden and returned 31 yards for a touchdown. This was followed in the second quarter by RB Javarris James getting a 3-yard TD run. They eventually scored with kicker Mike Nugent nailing a 27-yard field goal, followed by Palmer finding WR Chad Ochocinco on a 5-yard TD pass. The Bengals fell further behind when Vinatieri made a 47-yard field goal, followed in the fourth quarter by his 23-yard field goal. The Bengals only came back with 1 touchdown when Palmer connected to TE Jermaine Gresham on a 19-yard TD pass.

With the loss, Cincinnati fell to 2–7 and surpassed their 2009 loss total.

=== Week 11: vs. Buffalo Bills ===
Week 11: Buffalo Bills at Cincinnati Bengals – Game summary

Quarter	1	2	3	4	Total
Bills	7	7	14	21	49
Bengals	7	24	0	0	31

at Paul Brown Stadium, Cincinnati, Ohio

- Date: November 21
- Game time: 1:00 pm. EST
- Game weather: 65 °F (18 °C)
- Game attendance: 55,654
- Referee: Ed Hochuli
- TV announcers (CBS): Gus Johnson and Steve Tasker (blacked out locally)
- Recap

Game information

First quarter

- CIN – Chad Ochocinco 2-yard pass from Carson Palmer (Aaron Pettrey kick), Bengals 7–0, Drive: 13 plays, 62 yards, 6:53.
- BUF – Fred Jackson 7-yard run (Rian Lindell kick), Tied 7–7, Drive: 12 plays, 89 yards, 6:03.

Second quarter

- CIN – Terrell Owens 4-yard pass from Carson Palmer (Aaron Pettrey kick), Bengals 14–7, Drive: 6 plays, 78 yards, 2:54.
- CIN – Cedric Benson 1-yard run (Aaron Pettrey kick), Bengals 21–7, Drive: 4 plays, 34 yards, 2:18.
- CIN – Johnathan Joseph 21-yard interception return (Aaron Pettrey kick), Bengals 28–7,
- BUF – Donald Jones 28-yard pass from Ryan Fitzpatrick (Rian Lindell kick), Bengals 28–14, Drive: 4 plays, 56 yards, 1:21.
- CIN – Aaron Pettrey 19-yard field goal, Bengals 31–14, Drive: 6 plays, 59 yards, 1:17.

Third quarter

- BUF – Stevie Johnson 28-yard pass from Ryan Fitzpatrick (Rian Lindell kick), Bengals 31–21, Drive: 9 plays, 68 yards, 4:17.
- BUF – Drayton Florence 27-yard fumble return (Rian Lindell kick), Bengals 31–28,

Fourth quarter

- BUF – Steve Johnson 11-yard pass from Ryan Fitzpatrick (Rian Lindell kick), Bills 35–31, Drive: 8 plays, 49 yards, 3:47.
- BUF – Steve Johnson 32-yard pass from Ryan Fitzpatrick (Rian Lindell kick), Bills 42–31, Drive: 3 plays, 49 yards, 1:29.
- BUF – Fred Jackson 30-yard run (Rian Lindell kick), Bills 49–31, Drive: 2 plays, 36 yards, 0:38.

Top passers

- BUF – Ryan Fitzpatrick – 21/34, 316 yards, 4 touchdowns, 2 interceptions
- CIN – Carson Palmer – 19/34, 230 yards, 2 touchdowns, 2 interceptions

Top rushers

- BUF – Fred Jackson – 21 rushes, 116 yards, 2 touchdowns
- CIN – Cedric Benson – 25 rushes, 124 yards, 1 touchdown

Top receivers

- BUF – Stevie Johnson – 8 receptions, 137 yards, 3 touchdowns
- CIN – Jordan Shipley – 5 receptions, 71 yards

Top tacklers

- BUF – Paul Posluszny – 6 tackles, 4 assists
- CIN – Dhani Jones – 6 tackles, 2 assists

The Bengals' tenth game was an AFC duel with the Bills. In the first quarter the Bengals took the lead when QB Carson Palmer completed a 2-yard TD pass to WR Chad Ochocinco. The Bills replied with RB Fred Jackson getting a 7-yard TD run. The Bengals pulled ahead with Palmer completing a 4-yard TD pass to WR Terrell Owens, and with RB Cedric Benson getting a 1-yard TD run, followed by CB Johnathan Joseph returning an interception 21 yards for a touchdown. The lead was narrowed when Fitzpatrick made a 28-yard TD pass to WR Donald Jones, but the Bengals increased their lead with kicker Aaron Pettrey nailing a 19-yard field goal. The lead was narrowed again in the third quarter with Fitzpatrick completing a 28-yard TD pass to WR Stevie Johnson, and with CB Drayton Florence recovering a fumble and returning the ball 27 yards for a touchdown. In the fourth quarter the Bengals fell behind with Fitzpatrick finding Johnson again on an 11 and a 32-yard TD pass. This was followed by Jackson getting a 30-yard TD run.

With the loss, the Bengals fell to 2–8.

=== Week 12: at New York Jets (Thanksgiving Classic) ===
Week 12: Cincinnati Bengals at New York Jets – Game summary

Quarter	1	2	3	4	Total
Bengals	0	7	0	3	10
Jets	0	3	14	9	26

at New Meadowlands Stadium, East Rutherford, New Jersey

- Date: November 25
- Game time: 8:20 pm. EST
- Game weather: 39 °F (4 °C) (Cloudy)
- Game attendance: 78,903
- Referee: Mike Carey
- TV announcers (NFLN): Bob Papa, Matt Millen, & Joe Theismann
- Recap

Game information

First quarter

Second quarter

- NYJ – Nick Folk 27-yard field goal, Jets 3–0, Drive: 9 plays, 69 yards, 4:05.
- CIN – Jordan Shipley 5-yard pass from Carson Palmer (Aaron Pettrey kick), Bengals 7–3, Drive: 10 plays, 63 yards, 2:11.

Third quarter

- NYJ – Brad Smith 53-yard run (Nick Folk kick), Jets 10–7, Drive: 2 plays, 69 yards, 0:47.
- NYJ – Santonio Holmes 13-yard pass from Mark Sanchez (Nick Folk kick), Jets 17–7, Drive: 2 plays, 14 yards, 0:48.

Fourth quarter

- CIN – Aaron Pettrey 28-yard field goal, Jets 17–10, Drive: 6 plays, 15 yards, 2:17.
- NYJ – Brad Smith 89-yard kickoff return (Nick Folk kick), Jets 24–10, Drive: 0 plays, 0 yards, 0:15.
- NYJ – Carson Palmer sacked in end zone by Trevor Pryce for a Safety, Jets 26–10.

Top passers

- CIN – Carson Palmer – 17/38, 135 yards, 1 touchdown, 2 interceptions
- NYJ – Mark Sanchez – 16/28, 166 yards, 1 touchdown, 1 interception

Top rushers

- CIN – Cedric Benson – 18 rushes, 41 yards
- NYJ – Shonn Greene – 18 rushes, 70 yards

Top receivers

- CIN – Chad Ochocinco – 4 receptions, 41 yards
- NYJ – Dustin Keller – 4 receptions, 49 yards

Top tacklers

- CIN – Dhani Jones – 10 tackles, 1 assist
- NYJ – Eric Smith – 8 tackles

Trying to snap a seven-game losing streak, the Bengals flew to New Meadowlands Stadium for a Week 12 Thanksgiving duel with the New York Jets. After a scoreless first quarter, Cincinnati trailed in the second quarter as Jets kicker Nick Folk got a 27-yard field goal. The Bengals would take the lead as quarterback Carson Palmer found wide receiver Jordan Shipley on a 5-yard touchdown pass.

New York regained the lead in the third quarter with wide receiver/quarterback Brad Smith getting a 53-yard touchdown run, followed by quarterback Mark Sanchez completing a 13-yard touchdown pass to wide receiver Santonio Holmes. Cincinnati tried to rally in the fourth quarter with a 28-yard field goal from rookie kicker Aaron Pettrey, but the Jets came right back with Smith's 89-yard kickoff return for a touchdown, followed by defensive end Trevor Pryce sacking Palmer in the endzone for safety.

With the loss, the Bengals fell to 2–9, and were officially eliminated from postseason contention with other results in Week 12.

This would be the only time Cincinnati played on Thanksgiving until 2025.

=== Week 13: vs. New Orleans Saints ===
Week 13: New Orleans Saints at Cincinnati Bengals – Game summary

Quarter	1	2	3	4	Total
Saints	3	10	7	14	34
Bengals	0	6	6	18	30

at Paul Brown Stadium, Cincinnati, Ohio

- Date: December 5
- Game time: 1:00 pm. EST
- Game weather: 32 °F (0 °C) (Cloudy)
- Game attendance: 59,963
- Referee: Jeff Triplette
- TV announcers (Fox): Ron Pitts, John Lynch and Nischelle Turner (blacked out locally)
- Recap

Game information

First quarter

- NO – Garrett Hartley 48-yard field goal, Saints 3–0, Drive: 8 plays, 65 yards, 4:21.

Second quarter

- CIN – Clint Stitser 29-yard field goal, Tied 3–3, Drive: 13 plays, 42 yards, 7:08.
- NO – Chris Ivory 55-yard run (Garrett Hartley kick), Saints 10–3, Drive: 3 plays, 68 yards, 1:01.
- CIN – Clint Stitser 23-yard field goal, Saints 10–6, Drive: 4 plays, 50 yards, 2:21.
- NO – Garrett Hartley 24-yard field goal, Saints 13–6, Drive: 11 plays, 88 yards, 3:15.

Third quarter

- NO – Chris Ivory 1-yard run (Garrett Hartley kick), Saints 20–6, Drive: 11 plays, 66 yards, 5:54.
- CIN – Terrell Owens 5-yard pass from Carson Palmer (kick failed, wr), Saints 20–12, Drive: 9 plays, 60 yards, 5:12.

Fourth quarter

- CIN – Cedric Benson 1-yard run (Clint Stitser kick), Saints 20–19, Drive: 7 plays, 46 yards, 3:36.
- NO – Robert Meachem 52-yard pass from Drew Brees (Garrett Hartley kick), Saints 27–19, Drive: 3 plays, 69 yards, 1:25.
- CIN – Cedric Benson 4-yard run (Carson Palmer – Jermaine Gresham pass), Tied 27–27, Drive: 8 plays, 59 yards, 4:05.
- CIN – Clint Stitser 47-yard field goal, Bengals 30–27, Drive: 5 plays, 15 yards, 1:38.
- NO – Marques Colston 3-yard pass from Drew Brees (Garret Hartley kick), Saints 34–30, Drive: 7 plays, 68 yards, 3:54.

Top passers

- NO – Drew Brees – 24/29, 313 yards, 2 touchdowns, 1 interception
- CIN – Carson Palmer – 23/33, 249 yards, 1 touchdown

Top rushers

- NO – Chris Ivory – 15 rushes, 117 yards, 2 touchdowns
- CIN – Cedric Benson – 19 rushes, 49 yards, 2 touchdowns

Top receivers

- NO – Robert Meachem – 3 receptions, 106 yards, 1 touchdown
- CIN – Chad Ochocinco – 5 receptions, 96 yards

Top tacklers

- NO – Roman Harper – 5 tackles, 4 assists, 1 sack
- CIN – Johnathan Joseph – 6 tackles

Trying to break an eight-game losing streak the Bengals played on home ground for an interconference duel with the Saints. In the first quarter, the Bengals trailed early as kicker Garrett Hartley nailed a 48-yard field goal. They replied with kicker Clint Stitser hitting a 29-yard field goal, but the Saints scored again with RB Chris Ivory getting a 55-yard TD run, with the Bengals responding as Stitser made a 23-yard field goal. They struggled further as Hartley made a 24-yard field goal, followed by Ivory getting a 1-yard TD run. The Bengals narrowed the lead as QB Carson Palmer made a 5-yard TD pass to WR Terrell Owens (With a failed PAT as the kick went wide right), followed by RB Cedric Benson getting a 1-yard TD run. The Saints responded as QB Drew Brees completed a 52-yard TD pass to WR Robert Meachem, but the Bengals fought back to take the lead for the first time with Benson gettingt a 4-yard TD run (With a successful 2-point conversion as Palmer passed to TE Jermaine Gresham), followed by Stitser making a 47-yard field goal. They failed to maintain this lead after Brees threw a 3-yard TD pass to WR Marques Colston.

With the loss, the Bengals fell to 2–10.

=== Week 14: at Pittsburgh Steelers ===
Week 14: Cincinnati Bengals at Pittsburgh Steelers – Game summary

Quarter	1	2	3	4	Total
Bengals	7	0	0	0	7
Steelers	0	10	3	10	23

at Heinz Field, Pittsburgh, Pennsylvania

- Date: December 12
- Game time: 1:00 pm. EST
- Game weather: 37 °F (3 °C) (Light Rain)
- Game attendance: 57,501
- Referee: Walt Coleman
- TV announcers (CBS): Greg Gumbel and Dan Dierdorf
- Recap

Game information

First quarter

- CIN – Andrew Whitworth 1-yard pass from Carson Palmer (Clint Stitser kick), Bengals 7–0, Drive: 8 plays, 69 yards, 5:02.

Second quarter

- PIT – Troy Polamalu 45-yard interception return (Shaun Suisham kick), Tied 7–7.
- PIT – Shaun Suisham 23-yard field goal, Steelers 10–7, Drive: 13 plays, 75 yards, 2:00.

Third quarter

- PIT – Shaun Suisham 35-yard field goal, Steelers 13–7, Drive: 10 plays, 54 yards, 6:26.

Fourth quarter

- PIT – LaMarr Woodley 14-yard interception return (Shaun Suisham kick), Steelers 20–7.
- PIT – Shaun Suisham 41-yard field goal, Steelers 23–7, Drive: 7 plays, 45 yards, 4:16.

Top passers

- CIN – Carson Palmer – 20/32, 178 yards, 1 touchdown, 3 interceptions
- PIT – Ben Roethlisberger – 21/33, 258 yards

Top rushers

- CIN – Cedric Benson – 8 rushes, 19 yards
- PIT – Rashard Mendenhall – 18 rushes, 66 yards

Top receivers

- CIN – Chad Ochocinco – 6 receptions, 71 yards
- PIT – Hines Ward – 8 receptions, 115 yards

Top tacklers

- CIN – Roy L. Williams – 8 tackles, 3 assists
- PIT – James Farrior – 6 tackles, 4 assists

Trying to snap a nine-game losing streak, the Bengals flew to Heinz Field for a Week 14 AFC North rematch with the Pittsburgh Steelers. In the first quarter, Cincinnati delivered the game's opening strike in the first quarter as quarterback Carson Palmer found offensive tackle Andrew Whitworth on a 1-yard touchdown pass. In the second quarter, the Steelers answered with safety Troy Polamalu returning an interception 45 yards for a touchdown; followed by kicker Shaun Suisham nailing a 23-yard field goal.

In the third quarter, Pittsburgh added onto their lead with Suisham getting a 35-yard field goal. In the fourth quarter, the Steelers pulled away with linebacker LaMarr Woodley returning an interception 14 yards for a touchdown, followed by Suisham making a 41-yard field goal.

With the loss, the Bengals fell to 2–11.

=== Week 15: vs. Cleveland Browns ===
Week 15: Cleveland Browns at Cincinnati Bengals – Game summary

Quarter	1	2	3	4	Total
Browns	7	0	0	10	17
Bengals	0	10	6	3	19

at Paul Brown Stadium, Cincinnati, Ohio

- Date: December 19
- Game time: 1:00 pm. EST
- Game weather: 28 °F (−2 °C) (Partly Cloudy)
- Game attendance: 56,342
- Referee: Jerome Boger
- TV announcers (CBS): Don Criqui and Steve Beuerlein (blacked out locally)
- Recap

Game information

First quarter

- CLE – Robert Royal 20-yard pass from Colt McCoy (Phil Dawson kick), Browns 7–0, Drive: 6 plays, 75 yards, 2:52.

Second quarter

- CIN – Cedric Benson 18-yard run (Clint Stitser kick), Tied 7–7, Drive: 10 plays, 91 yards, 6:15.
- CIN – Clint Stitser 25-yard field goal, Bengals 10–7, Drive: 13 plays, 68 yards, 7:27.

Third quarter

- CIN – Clint Stitser 39-yard field goal, Bengals 13–7, Drive: 8 plays, 39 yards, 3:49.
- CIN – Clint Stitser 34-yard field goal, Bengals 16–7, Drive: 10 plays, 37 yards, 5:26.

Fourth quarter

- CLE – Phil Dawson 23-yard field goal, Bengals 16–10, Drive: 9 plays, 61 yards, 4:27.
- CIN – Clint Stitser 20-yard field goal, Bengals 19–10, Drive: 9 plays, 77 yards, 4:08.
- CLE – Brian Robiskie 46-yard pass from Colt McCoy (Phil Dawson kick), Bengals 19–17, Drive: 5 plays, 88 yards, 1:53.

Top passers

- CLE – Colt McCoy – 19/25, 243 yards, 2 touchdowns
- CIN – Carson Palmer – 14/23, 209 yards

Top rushers

- CLE – Peyton Hillis – 14 rushes, 59 yards
- CIN – Cedric Benson – 31 rushes, 150 yards, 1 touchdown

Top receivers

- CLE – Benjamin Watson – 7 receptions, 92 yards
- CIN – Andre Caldwell – 4 receptions, 89 yards

Top tacklers

- CIN – T. J. Ward – 6 tackles, 2 assists
- CLE – Rey Maualuga, Roy L. Williams – 4 tackles, 4 assists

Hoping to break a 10-game losing streak the Bengals played on home ground for an AFC North rivalry rematch against the Browns. In the first quarter the Bengals trailed early as QB Colt McCoy threw a 20-yard TD pass to TE Robert Royal; but they rallied to get the lead back with RB Cedric Benson getting an 18-yard TD run, followed by kicker Clint Stitser nailing a 25, 39 and a 34-yard field goal. The lead was narrowed with kicker Phil Dawson making a 23-yard field goal, but the Bengals rebuilt their 9-point lead with Stitser making a 20-yard field goal. The lead was narrowed again with McCoy completing a 46-yard TD pass to WR Brian Robiskie, but the Bengals defense was solid enough to hold them on for the win.

With the close win, Cincinnati improved to 3–11.

=== Week 16: vs. San Diego Chargers ===
Week 16: San Diego Chargers at Cincinnati Bengals – Game summary

Quarter	1	2	3	4	Total
Chargers	0	3	7	10	20
Bengals	7	6	0	21	34

at Paul Brown Stadium, Cincinnati, Ohio

- Date: December 26
- Game time: 4:05 pm. EST
- Game weather: 25 °F (−4 °C) (Cloudy with flurries)
- Game attendance: 54,194
- Referee: Gene Steratore
- TV announcers (CBS): Gus Johnson and Steve Tasker (blacked out locally)
- Recap

Game information

First quarter

- CIN – Jermaine Gresham 3-yard pass from Carson Palmer (Clint Stitser kick), Bengals 7–0, Drive: 5 plays, 32 yards, 2:40.

Second quarter

- CIN – Jerome Simpson 10-yard pass from Carson Palmer (kick failed, wl), Bengals 13–0, Drive: 8 plays, 59 yards, 4:47.
- SD – Nate Kaeding 20-yard field goal, Bengals 13–3, Drive: 12 plays, 73 yards, 6:19.

Third quarter

- SD – Ryan Mathews 23-yard run (Nate Kaeding kick), Bengals 13–10, Drive: 8 plays, 86 yards, 4:47.

Fourth quarter

- CIN – Jordan Shipley 3-yard pass from Carson Palmer (Clint Stitser kick), Bengals 20–10, Drive: 4 plays, 21 yards, 2:00.
- SD – Nate Kaeding 28-yard field goal, Bengals 20–13, Drive: 12 plays, 47 yards, 5:42.
- CIN – Jerome Simpson 59-yard pass from Carson Palmer (Clint Stitser kick), Bengals 27–13, Drive: 3 plays, 62 yards, 0:53.
- CIN – Bernard Scott 10-yard run (Clint Stitser kick), Bengals 34–13, Drive: 3 plays, 26 yards, 1:33.
- SD – Kelley Washington 5-yard pass from Philip Rivers (Nate Kaeding kick), Bengals 34–20, Drive: 9 plays, 72 yards, 2:27.

Top passers

- SD – Philip Rivers – 27/40, 256 yards, 1 touchdown, 1 interception
- CIN – Carson Palmer – 16/21, 269 yards, 4 touchdowns

Top rushers

- SD – Ryan Mathews – 12 rushes, 55 yards, 1 touchdown
- CIN – Cedric Benson – 24 rushes, 52 yards

Top receivers

- SD – Legedu Naanee – 4 receptions, 59 yards
- CIN – Jerome Simpson – 6 receptions, 124 yards, 2 touchdowns

Top tacklers

- SD – Eric Weddle – 11 tackles, 5 assists
- CIN – Dhani Jones – 5 tackles, 3 assists

Coming off their win over the Browns the Bengals played on home ground for an AFC duel with the Chargers who were coming off two blowout wins and were still alive for a playoff berth at 8–6. In the first quarter the Bengals took the lead with QB Carson Palmer throwing a 3-yard TD pass to TE Jermaine Gresham. Then Palmer found WR Jerome Simpson on a 10-yard TD pass (PAT failed, wide left). The Chargers got on the board with kicker Nate Kaeding hitting a 20-yard field goal, followed by RB Ryan Mathews getting a 23-yard TD run, but the Bengals put more points up with Palmer getting a 3-yard TD pass to WR Jordan Shipley. The lead was narrowed with Kaeding making a 28-yard field goal, but the Bengals increased their lead after Palmer connected to Simpson on a 59-yard TD pass, followed by RB Bernard Scott getting a 10-yard TD run. The Chargers tried to come back after QB Philip Rivers made a 5-yard TD pass to WR Kelley Washington, but the Bengals defense prevented any more scoring chances, giving themselves the win.

With the win, the Bengals improved to 4–11 and effectively ended the Chargers playoff hopes.

=== Week 17: at Baltimore Ravens ===
Week 17: Cincinnati Bengals at Baltimore Ravens – Game summary

Quarter	1	2	3	4	Total
Bengals	0	0	0	7	7
Ravens	3	3	7	0	13

at M&T Bank Stadium, Baltimore, Maryland

- Date: January 2
- Game time: 1:00 pm. EST
- Game weather: 51 °F (11 °C) (Cloudy)
- Game attendance: 71,088
- Referee: Peter Morelli
- TV announcers (CBS): Kevin Harlan and Solomon Wilcots

Game information

First quarter

Second quarter

Third quarter

Fourth quarter

Top passers

- CIN –
- BAL –

Top rushers

- CIN –
- BAL –

Top receivers

- CIN –
- BAL –

Top tacklers

- CIN –
- BAL –

The Bengals' final game was a division rivalry rematch against the Ravens. The Bengals trailed throughout the game as kicker Billy Cundiff hit a 25 and a 47-yard field goal. This was followed by Ray Rice getting a 7-yard TD run. The lead was only narrowed with QB Carson Palmer throwing an 11-yard TD pass to WR Jerome Simpson, but the Bengals couldn't do any more, snapping their two-game winning streak and thus ending the season on a 4–12 record which would be the team's worst record under Marvin Lewis.
