= EScholar =

Education software

eScholar
- Industry: Computer software
- Founded: 1997
- Key people: Shawn Bay (CEO)
- Website: https://www.escholar.com

eScholar is a software company that provides software and services used by educators for student record management and career planning. eScholar manages data on more than 20 million students across the United States with its software.

== History ==
eScholar was founded in 1997 by Shawn Bay. Prior to eScholar, Bay was a marketing analyst at Procter & Gamble. eScholar is based in White Plains, New York.

In 2000, Plainfield Public School District in New Jersey, U.S. began using a data warehouse and analysis solution provided by eScholar. Between 2000 and 2002, eScholar grew from 10 to more than 600 school districts as clients.

In 2004, the Johns Hopkins University Center for Research on the Education of Students Placed At Risk (CRESPAR) published a report considering the implications of the collection and use of student data. This report explored the use of eScholar's data warehouse tool and other student data tooling.

In 2006, the Illinois State Board of Education selected eScholar as a subcontractor to author a feasibility study and functional requirements analysis for a data warehouse. As of this same year, the company had built data warehouses in at least 20 states.

In 2014, eScholar received media attention related to its data privacy practices.

Investors in eScholar include Education Growth Partners.
