= Dan Davis (defensive lineman) =

American football player (born 1986)

Profile
- Position: Defensive tackle

Personal information
- Born: January 7, 1986 (age 40); Newark, New Jersey, U.S.
- Listed height: 6 ft 2 in (1.88 m)
- Listed weight: 275 lb (125 kg)

Career information
- High school: Plainfield (NJ)
- College: Connecticut
- NFL draft: 2008: undrafted

Career history
- Indianapolis Colts (2008)*; New York Sentinels (2009)
- * Offseason or practice squad member only

Awards and highlights
- Rivals.com Second-team All-Big East (2007)

Dan Davis (born January 7, 1986) is an American former professional football defensive lineman. He was signed by the Indianapolis Colts as an undrafted free agent in 2008 and played for the New York Sentinels of the United Football League.

Davis was born in Newark, New Jersey, grew up in Plainfield, New Jersey and played high school football at Plainfield High School, where he was on the same team as Eugene Monroe. He played college football at UConn.
