= General Horn =

General Horn may refer to:

- Arvid Horn (1664–1742), Swedish general
- Gustav Evertsson Horn (1614–1666), Swedish general
- Henrik Horn (1618–1693), Swedish lieutenant general
- Tiemann Newell Horn (1868–1923), U.S. Army brigadier general

== See also ==
- Carl von Horn (1847–1923), Bavarian colonel general
- Carl von Horn (1903–1989), Swedish Army major general
- Henry Horne, 1st Baron Horne (1861–1929), British Army general
