= Tyrone Johnson (basketball) =

American basketball player

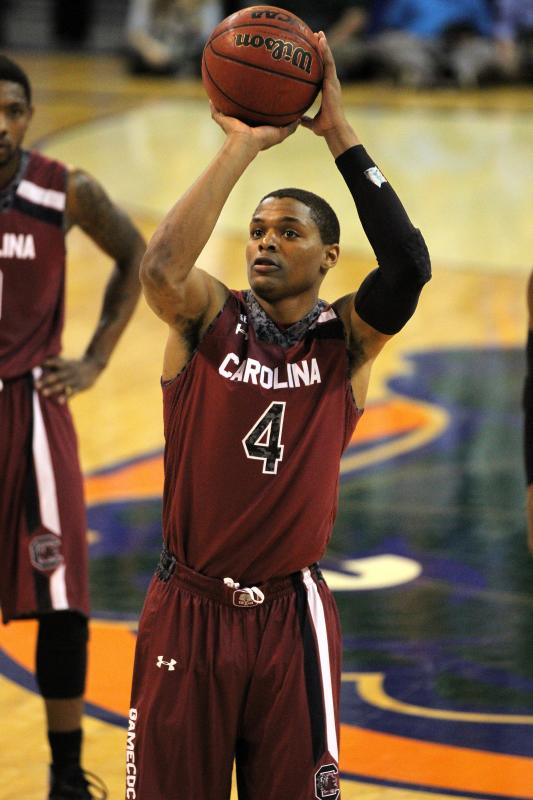
- Johnson playing for South Carolina

Personal information
- Born: July 28, 1992 (age 34) Plainfield, New Jersey, U.S.
- Listed height: 6 ft 3 in (1.91 m)
- Listed weight: 195 lb (88 kg)

Career information
- High school: Plainfield Plainfield, New Jersey; Montrose Christian School (Rockville, Maryland)
- College: Villanova (2011–2013); South Carolina (2013–2015)
- NBA draft: 2015: undrafted
- Playing career: 2015–2018
- Position: Point guard

Career history
- 2015–2016: Rio Grande Valley Vipers
- 2016: Grand Rapids Cyclones
- 2017: Al Shamal
- 2017–2018: KK Borac Čačak

Tyrone Johnson (born July 28, 1992) is an American professional basketball player.

Born and raised in Plainfield, New Jersey, Johnson played at Plainfield High School before transferring to Montrose Christian School for his senior year in an effort to position himself better for collegiate basketball.

== College career ==
Prior to his freshman year at Villanova, Johnson broke his left foot. Johnson averaged 3.3 points and 2.0 assists per game his first season with the Wildcats. He transferred to South Carolina during his sophomore year. Johnson was forced to miss an entire year of eligibility due to playing in an exhibition game with Villanova. He broke his right foot in a game against Texas A&M and played only 16 games as a junior for the Gamecocks. He was averaging 11.9 points per game up until that point. As a senior, he averaged 9.5 points, 3.5 assists and 2.7 rebounds per game for South Carolina.

== Professional career ==
After graduating from South Carolina, in 2015, he signed with the Rio Grande Valley Vipers of the NBA D-League. He was the only player to make the team by tryout. Johnson averaged 3.5 points, 1.4 rebounds and 1.0 assists per game in 23 games for the Vipers. The following season, he played with the Grand Rapids Cyclones of the Premier Basketball League.

On January 1, 2017, he signed with Al Shamal from Qatar. Johnson posted 18.3 points, 4.3 rebounds, 3.7 assists and 2.0 steals per game with Al Shamal. In September 2017, he signed with Serbian club KK Borac Čačak.
