= Plainfield School District =

Plainfield School District may refer to:

- Plainfield Community Consolidated School District 202, Illinois
- Plainfield Public School District, New Jersey

== See also ==
- Plainfield Public Schools of Plainfield, Connecticut
