= Plainfield Academy for the Arts and Advanced Studies =

Magnet school in Union County, New Jersey, US

Location
- 1700 West Front Street; Plainfield, Union County, New Jersey 07063; United States
- 40.597802°N 74.454097°W

Information
- Type: Magnet public high school
- Established: 2009
- School district: Plainfield Public School District
- NCES School ID: 341314003041
- Principal: Gregory Sneed
- Faculty: 41.0 FTEs
- Grades: 7-12
- Enrollment: 345 (as of 2023–24)
- Student to teacher ratio: 8.4:1
- Website: paaas.plainfieldnjk12.org

Plainfield Academy for the Arts and Advanced Studies (PAAAS) is a magnet six-year public middle school / high school specializing in visual and performing arts that serves students in seventh through twelfth grades from Plainfield, in Union County, in the U.S. state of New Jersey. The school is part of the Plainfield Public School District, one of New Jersey's 31 former Abbott districts. Opened in September 2009, the school requires that students are residents of the city who have been enrolled in the district for a minimum of a year.

As of the 2023–24 school year, the school had an enrollment of 345 students and 41.0 classroom teachers (on an FTE basis), for a student–teacher ratio of 8.4:1. There were 204 students (59.1% of enrollment) eligible for free lunch and 55 (15.9% of students) eligible for reduced-cost lunch.

== Awards and recognition ==
Plainfield Academy for the Arts and Advanced Studies (PAAAS) was ranked by U.S. News & World Report at 137th among New Jersey's 551 secondary schools and ranked within the top 40% in the nation.

== Administration ==
The school's principal is Gregory Sneed.
