= Otis Hudson =

American football player (born 1986)

No. 60
- Position: Guard

Personal information
- Born: July 19, 1986 (age 40); Chicago, Illinois, U.S.
- Listed height: 6 ft 5 in (1.96 m)
- Listed weight: 330 lb (150 kg)

Career information
- High school: Barrington (IL)
- College: Eastern Illinois
- NFL draft: 2010: 5th round, 152nd overall pick

Career history
- Cincinnati Bengals (2010−2013); Kansas City Chiefs (2014)*
- * Offseason or practice squad member only
- Stats at Pro Football Reference

Otis Hudson (born July 19, 1986) is an American former professional football guard. He was selected by the Cincinnati Bengals in the fifth round of the 2010 NFL draft. He played college football at Eastern Illinois.

== Early life ==
Otis was born and raised in the Village of Barrington. He used sports as a way to stay out of trouble. He liked playing basketball, football, and baseball. When Hudson was in middle school, he became part of AAU basketball, which was coached by Douglas Keys. He started playing football in 8th grade and realized he had great athletic ability in football. He played on both the varsity offensive line and defensive line, when he was a freshman at John Marshall High School. He also played on the varsity basketball team as the center. When he was a sophomore in high school, he told his parents he wanted to move to the suburbs, because he knew he would have a better opportunity of playing NCAA football. Otis and his family moved to Barrington, IL. He played varsity football and basketball at Barrington High School and graduated in 2005.

He graduated from Eastern Illinois University and helped his team earn All Conference and All Area recognitions. After graduation, he traveled to California to train with Travelle Gaines of Performance Gaines. Gaines always spoke highly of Hudson. "For the 2010 NFL draft, I have been training 24 top prospects, including Otis, and Otis is just as good as everyone I've seen. He has a work ethic that outclasses most and is very cooperative and coachable, which are intangibles you can't teach."

== Professional career ==
=== Cincinnati Bengals ===
On July 7, 2010, Hudson agreed to terms on his rookie contract with the Cincinnati Bengals. He was penciled in as the backup right guard. On September 4, 2010, he was waived by the Bengals. He cleared waivers and was re-signed to the Bengals' practice squad.

During the 2011 season, Hudson spent part of the season on the active roster and on the practice squad. Coach Paul Alexander said he was one of the most improved players during summer camp in 2011.

Hudson spent the entire 2012 season on the Bengals' practice squad. On August 10, 2013, after an ankle injury caused Bengals rookie Tanner Hawkinson to be sidelined indefinitely, the Bengals re-signed Hudson. Hudson was later released during final roster cuts.

=== Kansas City Chiefs ===
Hudson signed with the Kansas City Chiefs on May 1, 2014. He was released August 25 after suffering an Achilles injury

== Personal life ==
As of 2021, Otis works at Merrill Lynch as a financial advisor.
