= Henry Soles Jr. =

American journalist

- Born: Henry Soles Jr. August 17, 1935; Anniston, Alabama, U.S.
- Died: January 18, 2018 (aged 82); Naperville, Illinois, U.S.
- Education: Manhattan Bible Institute, Rutgers University
- Occupation: Minister

Henry Soles Jr. (August 17, 1935 – January 18, 2018) was a minister based out of Wheaton, Illinois, who served as the Senior chaplain for the Chicago Bulls for more than 30 years. His groundbreaking work in DuPage County helped establish more affordable housing options.

== Early life ==
Soles was born in Anniston, Alabama, but was raised in Plainfield, New Jersey. There he attended Plainfield High School, and later received degrees from Manhattan Bible Institute and Rutgers University. He spent the early part of his adult life as a minister and journalist in New Jersey. There he married his wife, Effie, who is also an ordained minister.

== Ministry ==
=== Professional sports ===
The Soles family moved to Wheaton, Illinois, in 1969 after he accepted a job at Urban Ministries Inc. in Calumet City. His ministry in professional sports began in 1973 when he was asked to lead chapel services for the Chicago Bears. Later in the decade he began to work with the Chicago White Sox, and eventually left the Bears to focus on his new role.

His experience with both teams led to him creating an organization in 1979 designed specifically to serve the spiritual needs of professional athletes, Intersports Associates Inc. That is also the year that he got the idea to lead chapel services as a volunteer for the Bulls.

He approached former Bulls forward Dwight Jones with the idea. The Bulls approved of Soles as chaplain, and he then led those services, which were open to visiting teams as well, for the next three decades.

=== Ministry in the community ===
Soles' ministry was not confined to Chicago Stadium, and later the United Center. He led a Bible study in downtown Chicago, a ministry for ex-convicts, and another ministry titled Gospel Outreach, to serve young people in a Chicago housing project.

As a resident of Wheaton, the DuPage County seat, he was heavily involved in the community where he resided. The Soles family was part of the ministerial staff at DuPage AME Church in Lisle, IL, and he also made a huge impact in DuPage County government.

Soles helped found the Community Housing Association of DuPage. Through that organization hundreds of affordable housing units were built in the affluent county. He also served for 10 years as the chairman of the DuPage Housing Authority.

His work around the Chicago metropolitan area has earned him in several honors, including Wheaton's 2001 Adult Good Citizen award, and the Serenity House in Arlington Heights, IL giving him their Man of the Year award.

=== Books ===
Soles edited two books which were published by Tyndale House, The Soul Food New Testament and the Children of Color Bible.

=== Death and Illness ===
Soles battled Alzheimer's disease late in his life. He died on January 18, 2018, in Naperville, Illinois, of aspiration pneumonia.
