= William C. Rivers =

United States Army general (1866–1943)

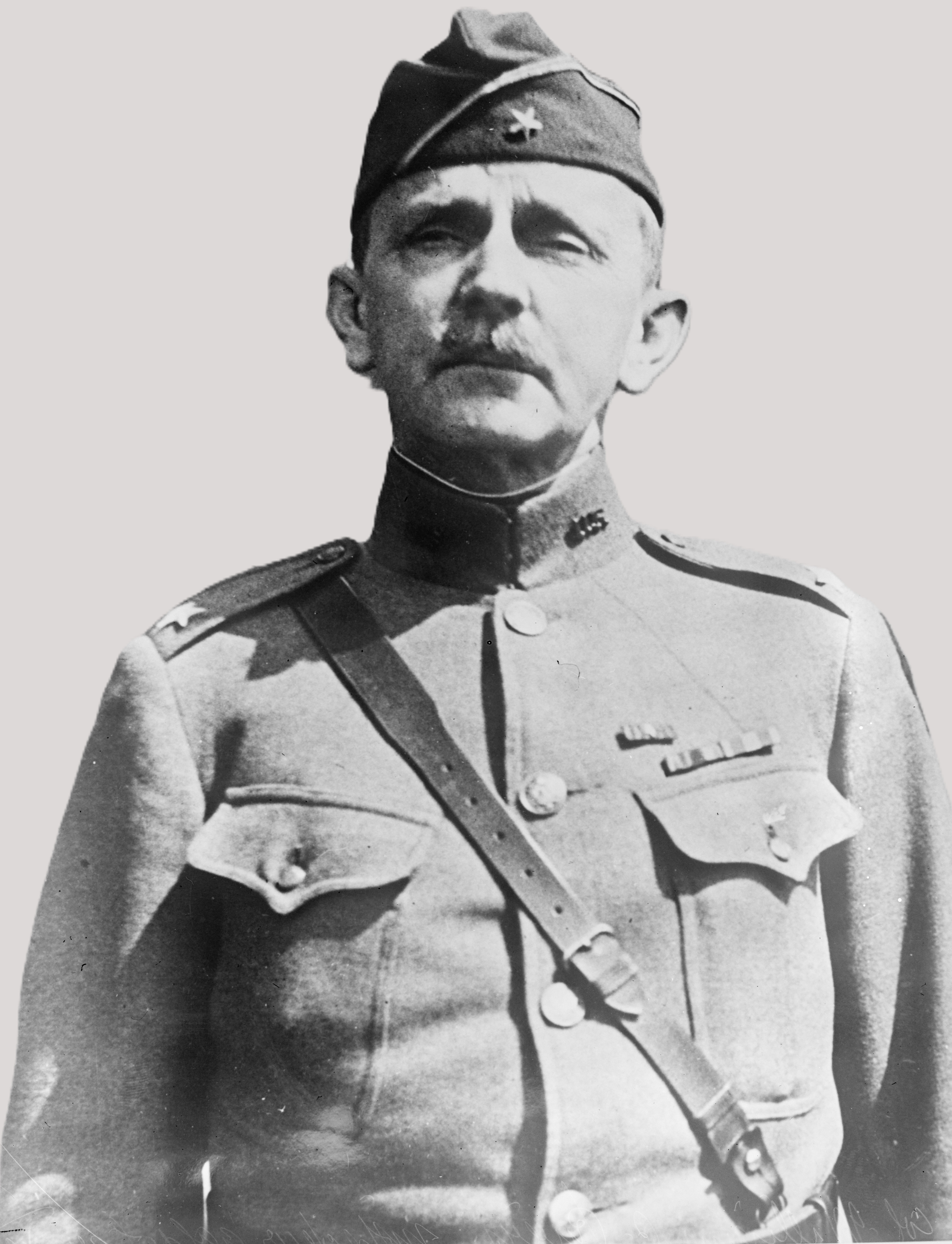
- National Archives photo of Rivers in October 1927.
- Born: January 11, 1866; Pulaski, Tennessee, US
- Died: July 10, 1943 (aged 77); Fletcher, North Carolina, US
- Burial place: Arlington National Cemetery
- Spouse: Mary Dancey Battle (m. 1897–1943)
- Children: 2
- Relatives: Tiemann Newell Horn (brother-in-law)
- Military career
- Service: United States Army
- Service years: 1887–1930
- Rank: Major General
- Service number: 0–168
- Units: U.S. Army Cavalry Branch; U.S. Army Inspector General Department
- Commands: Philippine Constabulary; 18th Cavalry Regiment; 76th Field Artillery Regiment; 5th Field Artillery Brigade; 12th Cavalry Regiment; Sub-District of New Mexico; 3rd Cavalry Regiment; Inspector General of the United States Army
- Wars: Spanish–American War; Philippine–American War; World War I
- Awards: Army Distinguished Service Medal; Croix de Guerre (France)

William Cannon Rivers (11 January 1866 – 10 July 1943) was a career officer in the United States Army. An 1887 graduate of the United States Military Academy at West Point, he was a veteran of the American Indian Wars, the Spanish–American War, the Philippine–American War, and World War I. Rivers served until 1930 and attained the rank of major general. He served as Inspector General of the United States Army from 1927 until his retirement and was a recipient of the Army Distinguished Service Medal and French Croix de Guerre.

A native of Pulaski, Tennessee, Rivers graduated from the United States Military Academy (West Point) in 1887 and began his career in the Cavalry. Rivers served in the western United States during the American Indian Wars, and in Cuba during the Spanish–American War. During the Philippine–American War, he served for several years with the Philippine Constabulary, which he commanded from 1912 to 1914. During World War I, he commanded a Field Artillery regiment, and later a brigade. After the war, he served as Inspector General of the United States Army.

Rivers retired in 1927. He died in Fletcher, North Carolina on 10 July 1943. Rivers was buried at Arlington National Cemetery.

== Early life ==
Rivers was born in Pulaski, Tennessee on 11 January 1866, a son of William Rivers and Julia (Flournoy) Rivers. Among his siblings was Tyree Rodes Rivers (1862–1923), a career army officer who attained the rank of brigadier general. In addition, his sister Myra was the first wife of Brigadier General Tiemann Newell Horn. Rivers was raised and educated in Pulaski, and in 1883 he competed for an appointment to the United States Military Academy. He finished first of 10 applicants and received the appointment from U.S. Representative John Goff Ballentine. He graduated in 1887 ranked 24th of 64 and received his commission as a second lieutenant of Cavalry.

Many of Rivers's classmates became general officers during the First World War, including Frank Herman Albright, Marcus Daniel Cronin, Alexander Lucian Dade, James Theodore Dean, Charles S. Farnsworth, George Washington Gatchell, Charles Gerhardt, Herman Hall, Thomas Grafton Hanson, Mark L. Hersey, Ernest Hinds, Michael Joseph Lenihan, Ulysses G. McAlexander, Nathaniel Fish McClure, George Owen Squier, Charles Brewster Wheeler, and Edmund Wittenmyer.

== Early career ==
After receiving his commission, Rivers was assigned to the 1st Cavalry Regiment, which was serving at Camp Sheridan, Wyoming. In June 1889, the regiment was posted to Fort Custer, Montana. During his service in Montana, Rivers took part in the Ghost Dance War of 1890–1891.

In October 1891, Rivers was assigned to West Point as assistant quartermaster. In December 1893, he rejoined his regiment in Arizona. In August 1894, he was promoted to first lieutenant in the 3rd Cavalry Regiment. From 1895 to 1897, he was in charge of operations at Fort Apache Indian Reservation, and in November 1897 he was transferred back to the 1st Cavalry. During the April to August 1898 Spanish–American War, Rivers served with the 1st Cavalry in Cuba until he became ill at the end of June. After convalescing in Tampa, Florida for six weeks, he rejoined the 1st Cavalry during its mid-August demobilization at Camp Wikoff, New York. From September 1898 to January 1899, he performed temporary detached duty in New York City, after which he rejoined the 1st Cavalry at Fort Robinson, Nebraska.

=== Family ===
In 1897, Rivers married Mary Dancey Battle. They were the parents of two sons, James B. Rivers and William F. Rivers.

== Continued career ==
From 1899 to 1903, Rivers was assigned as West Point's adjutant, and he was promoted to captain in February 1901. In July 1903, Rivers was assigned to Philippine–American War duty in Manila, where he served in the office of the Military Information Division. In April 1904, he was assigned as adjutant of the Philippine Constabulary, and in September he was appointed as the constabulary's inspector general. In October 1906, Rivers was appointed assistant chief of the Philippine Constabulary with the temporary rank of colonel, and he served in this post until 1913. He was transferred to the 12th Cavalry Regiment in November 1909. In June 1910, he was assigned to the 1st Cavalry, and he was promoted to permanent major in March 1911. In May 1912, he was promoted to chief of the constabulary as a temporary brigadier general, and he served until March 1914.

Upon returning to the United States, Rivers was assigned to the Presidio of Monterey, California as a major in the 1st Cavalry, and in August he was transferred to the 2nd Cavalry at Fort Ethan Allen. On 1 July 1916, Rivers was promoted to lieutenant colonel and colonel. With the army expanding for US entry into World War I, in May 1917 he was assigned to command the newly-organized 18th Cavalry Regiment. Rivers led his regiment during organization at Fort Ethan Allen, then during subsequent training at Camp Shelby, Mississippi and Camp Merritt, New Jersey. When the army determined that Cavalry regiments would not be needed in France, existing Cavalry units were reorganized as Field Artillery; the 18th Cavalry became the 76th Field Artillery Regiment, which Rivers continued to command.

== Later career ==
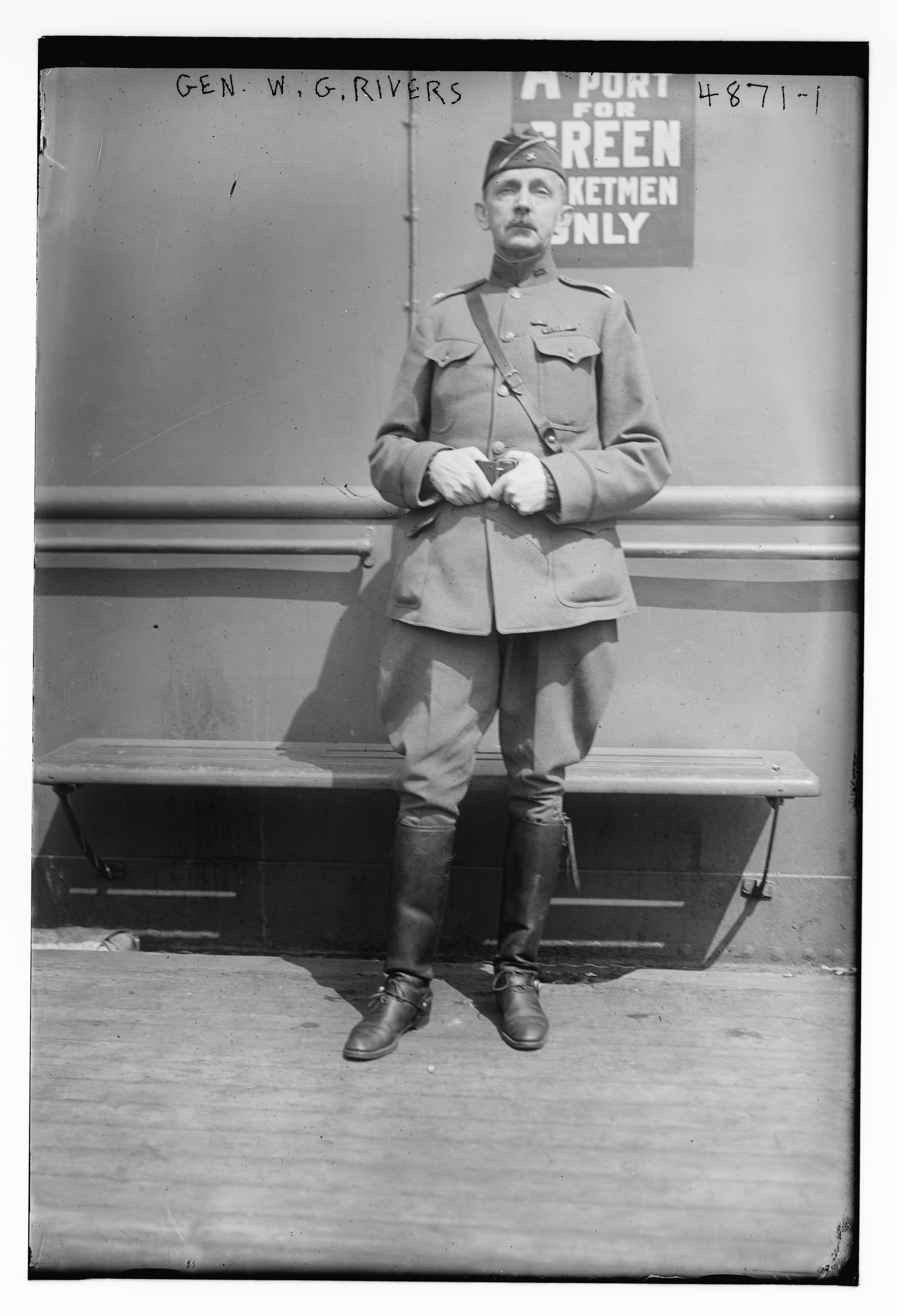
Rivers, probably during or just after World War I

Rivers led the 76th Field Artillery to France, and they arrived in May 1918. He commanded the regiment until October, when he was promoted to temporary brigadier general and assigned to command the 5th Field Artillery Brigade, a unit of the 5th Division. He remained in command of the brigade until the Armistice of November 11, 1918 ended the war. After the end of hostilities, Rivers remained in command at the start of the Occupation of the Rhineland. He returned to the United States in April 1919, and in August he returned to the permanent rank of colonel. For his wartime service, Rivers was awarded the Army Distinguished Service Medal and French Croix de Guerre.

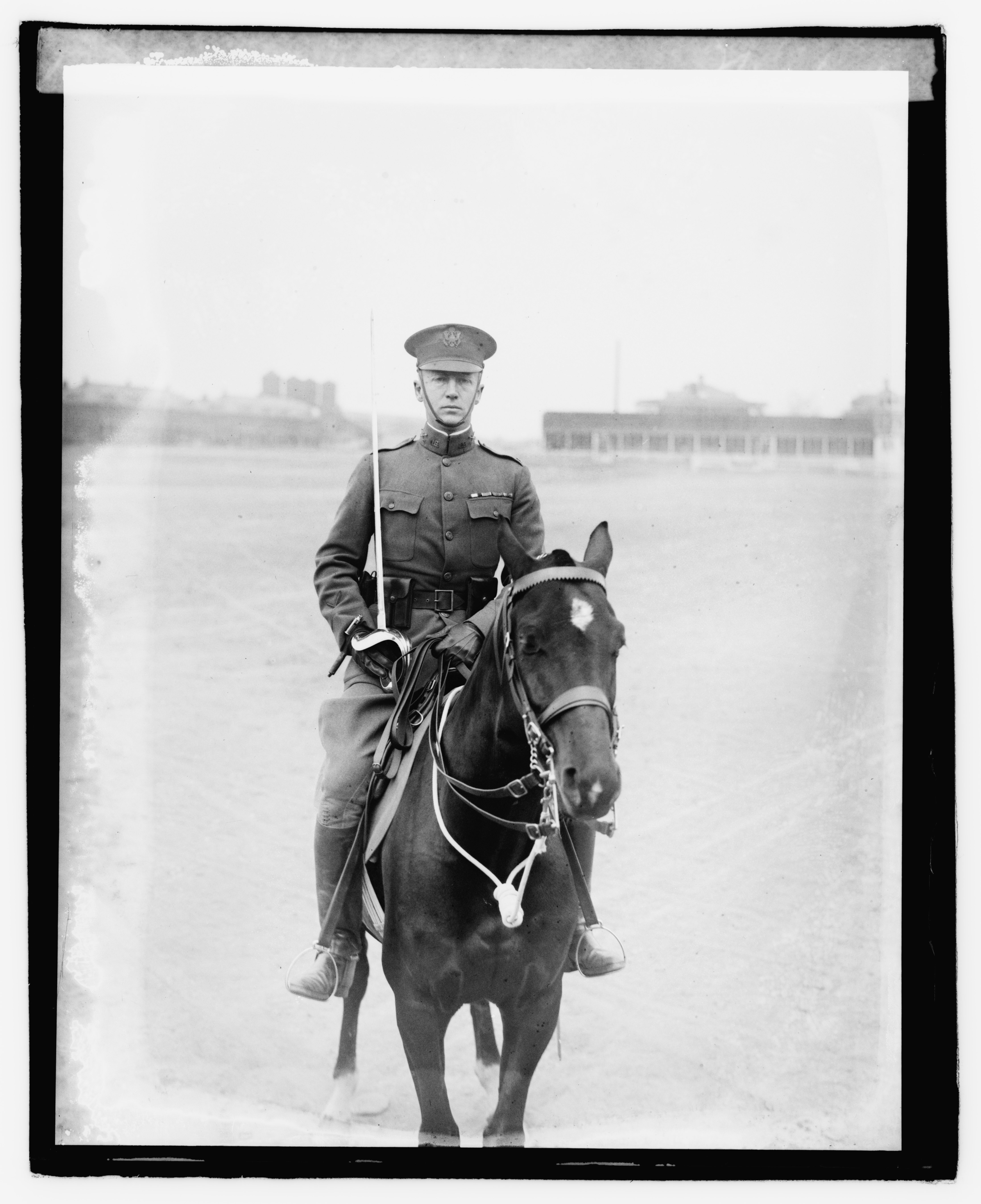
Rivers while serving as commander of the 3rd Cavalry Regiment in 1921

Distinguished Service Medal citation:

The President of the United States of America, authorized by Act of Congress, July 9, 1918, takes pleasure in presenting the Army Distinguished Service Medal to Brigadier General William Cannon Rivers, United States Army, for exceptionally meritorious and distinguished services to the Government of the United States, in a duty of great responsibility during World War I. As Commander of the 76th Field Artillery, 3d Division, Colonel Rivers was a material factor in stemming the tide of the enemy’s advance during the second Battle of the Marne. Subsequently, upon being promoted to the grade of Brigadier General, he displayed marked leadership and high military attainments in command of the 5th Field Artillery Brigade, 5th Division, in the Meuse-Argonne offensive.

Service: United States Army Rank: Brigadier General Unit: 5th Field Artillery Brigade Division: 5th Division, American Expeditionary Forces Action Date: World War I Orders: War Department, General Orders No. 89 (1919)

After his return to the United States, Rivers was assigned to command the 12th Cavalry Regiment and the sub-district of New Mexico. In March 1920, Rivers was assigned to command the 3rd Cavalry at Fort Myer, Virginia. In April 1923, Rivers was detailed to duty with the U.S. Army Inspector General Department and assigned as inspector general of the Second Corps Area, which was based at Fort Jay on Governors Island, New York. In September 1927, Rivers was appointed Inspector General of the United States Army and promoted to major general. He served in this post until reaching the mandatory retirement age of 64 in January 1930.

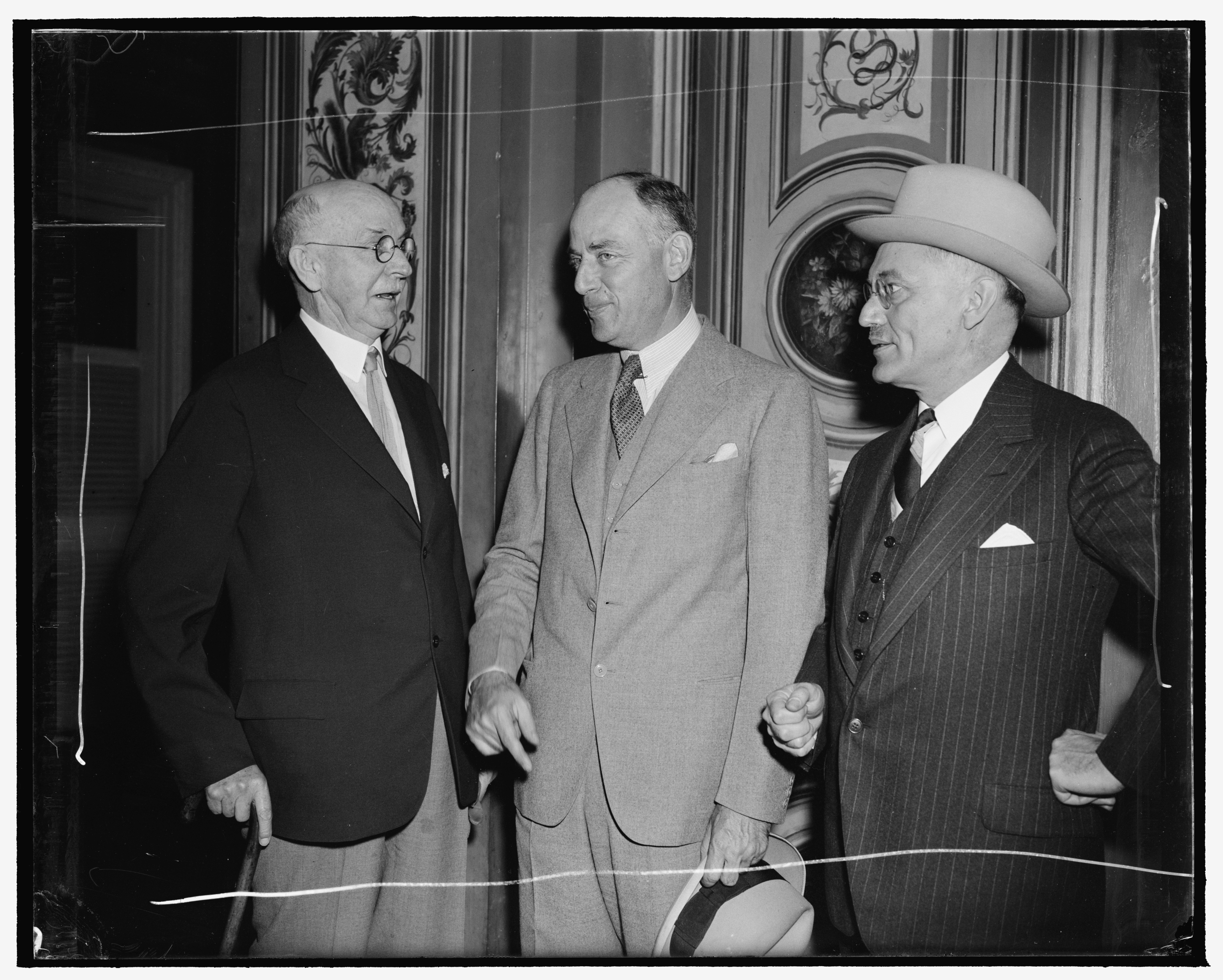
Rivers (left) with other supporters of the Ludlow Amendment in 1939

In retirement, Rivers resided in New York City and spent winters in Florida. In 1933, he wrote a New York Herald Tribune article in which he opposed a federal anti-lynching law. The article was widely republished, and included Rivers's use of examples from his North Carolina childhood to oppose lynching, but defend local control and states' rights. In 1937, he became head of a national committee that supported passage of the Ludlow Amendment, which would have required a national referendum to ratify a congressional declaration of war. In the years leading up to World War II, Rivers opposed U.S. military preparations, arguing that American possessions in the Pacific, including the Philippines and Guam, were too far away from the U.S. mainland to be effectively defended.

Rivers later moved to Warrenton, North Carolina, and his civic and professional memberships included the Sons of the Revolution, Huguenot Society of America, Society of the Army of Santiago de Cuba, and American Academy of Political and Social Science. He died in Fletcher, North Carolina on 10 July 1943, after experiencing a heart attack while traveling in western North Carolina. Rivers was buried at Arlington National Cemetery.
