= Plainfield High School (New Jersey) =

High school in Union County, New Jersey, US

- Postcard of building, c. 1930-45

Location
- 950 Park Avenue; Plainfield, Union County, New Jersey 07060; United States; 40.611948°N 74.412515°W

Information
- Type: Public high school
- Established: 1857
- School district: Plainfield Public School District
- NCES School ID: 341314005604
- Principal: Shadin Belal
- Faculty: 129.0 FTEs
- Grades: 9-12
- Enrollment: 2,145 (as of 2023–24)
- Student to teacher ratio: 16.6:1
- Colors: Scarlet and royal blue
- Athletics conference: Union County Interscholastic Athletic Conference (general); Big Central Football Conference (football)
- Team name: Cardinals
- Rival: Westfield High School
- Website: phs.plainfieldnjk12.org

Plainfield High School is a comprehensive community four-year public high school that serves students in ninth through twelfth grades from Plainfield, in Union County, in the U.S. state of New Jersey. The school is part of the Plainfield Public School District, one of New Jersey's 31 former Abbott districts. Plainfield High School was established in 1857, making it the second-oldest high school in New Jersey.

As of the 2023–24 school year, the school had an enrollment of 2,145 students and 129.0 classroom teachers (on an FTE basis), for a student–teacher ratio of 16.6:1. There were 1,473 students (68.7% of enrollment) eligible for free lunch and 190 (8.9% of students) eligible for reduced-cost lunch.

== History ==
For a period of time before the opening of Dunellen High School, students from Dunellen had attended the school as part of a sending/receiving relationship.

== Awards, recognition and rankings ==
The school was the 318th-ranked public high school in New Jersey out of 339 schools statewide in New Jersey Monthly magazine's September 2014 cover story on the state's "Top Public High Schools", using a new ranking methodology. The school had been ranked 280th in the state of 328 schools in 2012, after being ranked 307th in 2010 out of 322 schools listed. The magazine ranked the school 293rd in 2008 out of 316 schools. The school was ranked 307th in the magazine's September 2006 issue, which surveyed 316 schools across the state.

== Athletics ==
The Plainfield High School Cardinals compete in the Union County Interscholastic Athletic Conference, which is comprised of public and private high schools in Union County and was established following a reorganization of sports leagues in Northern New Jersey by the New Jersey State Interscholastic Athletic Association (NJSIAA). Before the 2010 realignment, the school had competed in the Watchung Conference, a high school sports association that included public high schools in Essex, Hudson and Union counties. With 1,553 students in grades 10-12, the school was classified by the NJSIAA for the 2019–20 school year as Group IV for most athletic competition purposes, which included schools with an enrollment of 1,060 to 5,049 students in that grade range. The football team competes in Division 5A of the Big Central Football Conference, which includes 60 public and private high schools in Hunterdon, Middlesex, Somerset, Union and Warren counties, which are broken down into 10 divisions by size and location. The school was classified by the NJSIAA as Group V North for football for 2024–2026, which included schools with 1,317 to 5,409 students.

Plainfield's football rivalry with Westfield High School dates back to 1900, making it one of the oldest active public high school football rivalry in the state. The rivalry with Westfield was listed at 17th on NJ.com's 2017 list "Ranking the 31 fiercest rivalries in N.J. HS football". Westfield leads the rivalry with a 60-45-7 record as of 2017.

The boys track team won the Group IV spring / outdoor track state championship in 1947, 1950, 1951, 1959-1961, 1980 and 2009. The 11 group titles won by the program are tied for fifth-most in the state.

The boys track team won the indoor track all-group state championship in 1953, and won the Group IV title in 1960, 1962-1964, 1975 (as co-champion), 1980-1982 and 2009; the boys program's nine group titles are tied for sixth in the state. The girls team won the Group IV title in 1982, 1985, 1992, 1993 (as co-champion), 1999; the five group titles won by the girl's program is tied for seventh-most among New Jersey schools.

The boys cross country running team won the Group IV state championship in 1957 and 1959.

The boys track team won the winter track Meet of Champions in 1975, 1980 and 1981.

The boys' basketball team won the Group IV state championship in 1976 (defeating Neptune High School in the tournament final), 1983 (vs. Trenton Central High School), 2011 (vs. Burlington Township High School) and 2012 (vs. Neptune). Down by nine points early in the fourth quarter of the championship game, the 1972 team came back to tie Neptune in regulation and win the Group IV title 75-72 in overtime. The team won the 2004 North II, Group IV state sectional championship, defeating Elizabeth High School 47–42 in the final. The 2012 team came back from a five-point deficit at the half to win the Group III title with a 58–48 defeat of Neptune in the championship game played at the Pine Belt Arena. The squad advanced to the NJISAA Tournament of Champions final in 2011 and 2012, both times losing to national private school powerhouse St. Anthony High School. Hall of Fame coach Bob Hurley called Plainfield, "the best basketball community in New Jersey."

The boys' track team won the Group IV state indoor relay championship in 1980 and 1981 (as co-champion with Trenton Central High School). The girls' track team won the title in 1981, 1985, 1986 and 1991; the four titles won by the girls track team is tied for tenth-most statewide.

The girls' outdoor track and field team won the Group IV state championship in 1982, 1985, 1986, 1991 and 1993.

== Administration ==
The school's principal is Shadin Belal. The core administration team includes five vice principals.

== Notable alumni ==
- Ernest Robinson Ackerman (1863-1931), represented New Jersey's 5th congressional district in the United States House of Representatives from 1919 to 1931.
- Charlie Bicknell (1928-2013), pitcher who played in MLB for the Philadelphia Phillies.
- Joe Black (1924-2002), first African American pitcher to win a World Series game, in 1952.
- Jon Bramnick (born 1953), politician, who is a member of the New Jersey General Assembly and has served as Minority Leader of the Assembly since 2012.
- Jack E. Bronston (born 1922), lawyer and politician who served in the New York Senate from 1959 to 1978.
- Margaret Bourke-White (1906-1971), photographer.
- Milt Campbell (1933-2012), gold medalist in the decathlon at the 1956 Summer Olympics in Melbourne.
- W. Sterling Cary (1927–2021), president of the National Council of Churches from 1972 to 1975.
- Manny Collins (born 1984) cornerback who played in the NFL for the New York Jets.
- Dan Davis (born 1986), defensive lineman who played for the New York Sentinels of the United Football League.
- Jonathan Draper (born 1952), Anglican priest
- Tiemann Newell Horn (1868–1923, class of 1886), career officer in the United States Army who attained the rank of brigadier general.
- Tyrone Johnson (born 1992), professional basketball player.
- Donald Jones (born 1987), former NFL wide receiver who played for the Buffalo Bills.
- Pete Liske (born 1942, class of 1959), former professional football quarterback, who played in the NFL, AFL and CFL.
- Queena Mario (1896-1951), soprano opera singer, newspaper columnist, voice teacher and fiction writer.
- John Marshall (born 1963, class of 1981), former middle-distance track athlete who specialized in the 800 meters and competed at the 1984 Summer Olympics.
- Jack Martin (1887-1980), slick-fielding, weak-hitting infielder in Major League Baseball, playing mainly at shortstop for three different teams between the 1912 and 1914 seasons.
- Donald Martino (1931–2005), Pulitzer Prize-winning composer.
- Peter McDonough (1925-1998), member of the New Jersey Senate.
- Eugene Monroe (born 1987), professional football player with the NFL's Jacksonville Jaguars and collegiate star at the University of Virginia.
- Zelda Popkin (1898-1983), novelist.
- Justin Sears (born 1994), professional basketball player for MHP Riesen Ludwigsburg.
- Henry Soles Jr. (1935-2018), minister who served as the senior chaplain for the Chicago Bulls for more than 30 years.
- Helen Walulik (1929-2012, class of 1947), pitcher and an outfield/infield utility who played for three seasons in the All-American Girls Professional Baseball League.
- Adella Wotherspoon (1903-2004, class of 1921), youngest and longest-living survivor of the 1904 fire on the General Slocum. After graduating from the school, she taught business administration here from 1925 to 1961.
