= Tiemann Newell Horn =

United States Army general

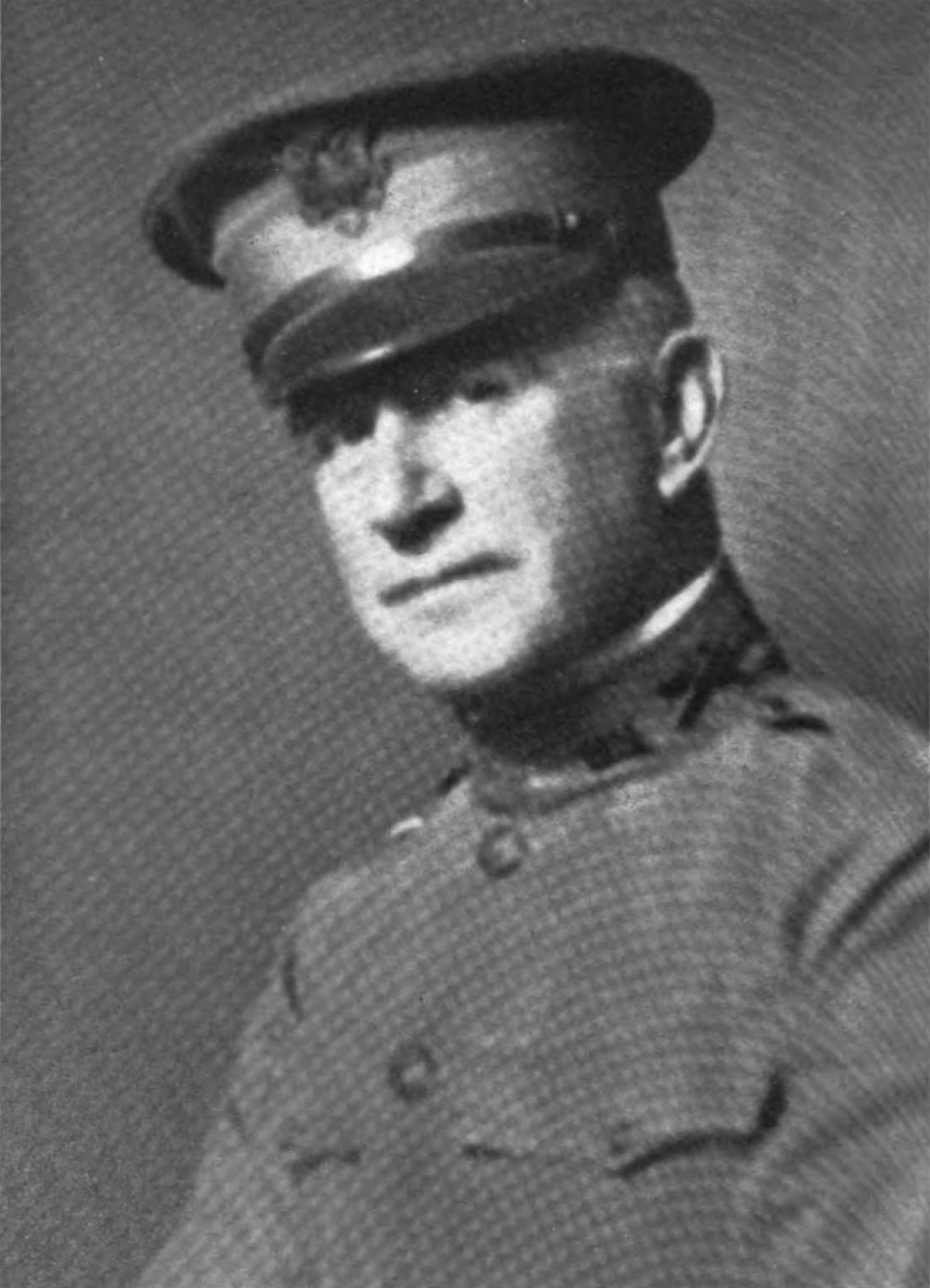
- Born: January 18, 1868; Brooklyn, New York, US
- Died: May 5, 1923 (aged 55); Honolulu, Hawaii Territory
- Burial place: Arlington National Cemetery, Arlington, Virginia
- Spouse(s): Myra Rivers (m. 1894); Mabel Tillou Young Davis (m. 1904); Isabel Howell (m. 1917)
- Children: 3
- Military career
- Allegiance: United States
- Service: United States Army
- Service years: 1891–1923
- Rank: Brigadier General
- Nicknames: "Tin" "TNT"
- Service number: 0-225
- Commands: 13th Field Artillery Regiment; 7th Field Artillery Brigade; 7th Infantry Division
- Wars: World War I

Tiemann Newell Horn (January 18, 1868 – May 5, 1923) was a career officer in the United States Army. A veteran of World War I, he attained the rank of brigadier general.

== Early life ==
Tiemann Newell Horn was born to Daniel Tiemann Horn and Frances (Carpron) Horn in Brooklyn, New York on January 18, 1868. He attended the schools of Plainfield, New Jersey, and was an 1886 graduate of Plainfield High School. Horn attended the United States Military Academy and graduated number nine of 65 in the Class of 1891.

== Military career ==
Horn was commissioned to the 3rd Cavalry and transferred to the 2nd Artillery. From 1903 to 1906, Horn was the ordnance officer and artillery engineer for the Southern Artillery District in New York. Horn also participated in the Jamestown Exposition in 1907. From 1911 to 1912, Horn graduated from both the Army School of the Line and the Army Staff College at Fort Leavenworth, Kansas (now the United States Army Command and General Staff College).

From 1915 to 1918, Horn was stationed in the Philippines and Hawaii. Horn was promoted to brigadier general on February 6, 1918.

During World War I, Horn commanded the 7th Field Artillery Brigade and the 7th Infantry Division. He was returned to his permanent rank of colonel on July 15, 1919.

== Later life ==
In 1920, Horn graduated from the United States Army War College in Washington, D.C. He was commander of the 13th Field Artillery Regiment at Schofield Barracks, Hawaii when he died of a heart attack on May 5, 1923, while playing golf at the Oahu Country Club with Colonel Otho W. B. Farr. Horn was buried at Arlington National Cemetery. In 1930, the U.S. Congress enacted legislation allowing the general officers of World War I to retire at the highest rank they held, and his rank of brigadier general was posthumously restored.

== Personal life ==
On November 28, 1894, Horn married Myra Rivers, the sister of generals Tyree Rodes Rivers and William Cannon Rivers. Mrs. Horn and their seven-year-old daughter Frances died in an accidental drowning in 1902. In 1904, Horn married Mabel Tillou Young Prettyman Davis. They later divorced, and in 1917, he married Isabel Howell Clinton.

With his first wife, Horn was the father of a son, Tyree Rodes Horn, a career U.S. Army officer who attained the rank of colonel. With his third wife, he was the father of a daughter, Adah Howell Horn.

Tiemann was an Episcopalian and Mason. He was also a member of the National Geographic Society, Naval and Military Order of the Spanish War, Military Order of Foreign Wars, Sons of the American Revolution, and General Society of the War of 1812.
