= Grand Rapids Cyclones =

American basketball team

The Grand Rapids Cyclones are a semi-pro basketball team from Grand Rapids, Michigan who compete in the Premier Basketball League. They joined the league in 2014. Home venue is the Deltaplex in Grand Rapids, Michigan owned by Joel Langlios.

The team was founded by Adam Chrisco and later took on Vincent J Woodhall ( Alarm Secure Inc ) as a partner.

The team was previously announced as joining ABA in 2012. The team would play about 25 games in the PBL in 2013 and 2014. Adam Chrisco hired Jeremiah Hamlet to coach the team and he also stepped in to replace him as Coach several times. Chrisco now coaches the Owensboro Thoroughbreds of the TBL.

In 2015 the NBA G League franchise purchased the rights to the Grand Rapids market and moved the Grand Rapids Drive into the Deltaplex.
