= Travelle Gaines =

American sports trainer (born 1981)

Travelle Ernest Gaines (born 9 March 1981 in Arabi, Louisiana) currently now runs his own performance facility, Athletic Gaines, after several years at Athletes’ Performance, an athletic training company based in Phoenix, Arizona. Since starting Performance Gaines in 2007, Travelle has worked with over 200 professional athletes, including both professional football and basketball players. His work has been featured on ESPN, NFL Network, and Fox Sports. High-profile professional players include National Football League players Reggie Bush, Chris Johnson, Jon Beason, and Ryan Mathews, and National Basketball Association player Brandon Roy.

== Background ==
Gaines played football at De La Salle High School in Concord, California and Vanden High School in Fairfield, California. In 1997-98, while at Vanden High School, Gaines was named the Northern California Offensive Player of the Year. Gaines also played baseball and was drafted by the Montreal Expos in the 11th round of the Major League Baseball Draft in 1998. During his collegiate career Gaines did not have the same success he had in high school: he committed to play football under University of Southern California Head Coach John Robinson, but after Robinson was fired in the fall of 1997 he elected not to play and sat out the 1998 season. In 1999, Gaines joined the scout squad at Utah State University. Gaines played one season for the football team at San Jose State in 2001, where he graduated in 2003.

== Career ==
In 2003, Gaines became defensive coordinator and special teams coach at James Lick High School in San Jose, California, where he inherited a program that had not won a game in three years. After one season James Lick finished with a 7-3 record in the San Jose’s Blossom Valley Athletic League. Between 2004 and 2006 Gaines worked three years as a Division 1 strength and condition coach at both the University of Louisiana-Monroe and Louisiana State University, learning the craft of weight lifting under Olympic weight lifting coach Gayle Hatch.

In 2007, Gaines founded Performance Gaines in Seattle, Washington and began to train players on his own. Starting with six players including Marcus Trufant and Erik Coleman, within a few months the program grew to include 30 players, the biggest NFL off-season training program in the country. Marketing was primarily by word of mouth. Gaines has also worked with star athletes such as Reggie Bush, Chris Johnson, Brandon Roy and Bob Sanders.
