= Eugene Monroe =

American football player (born 1987)

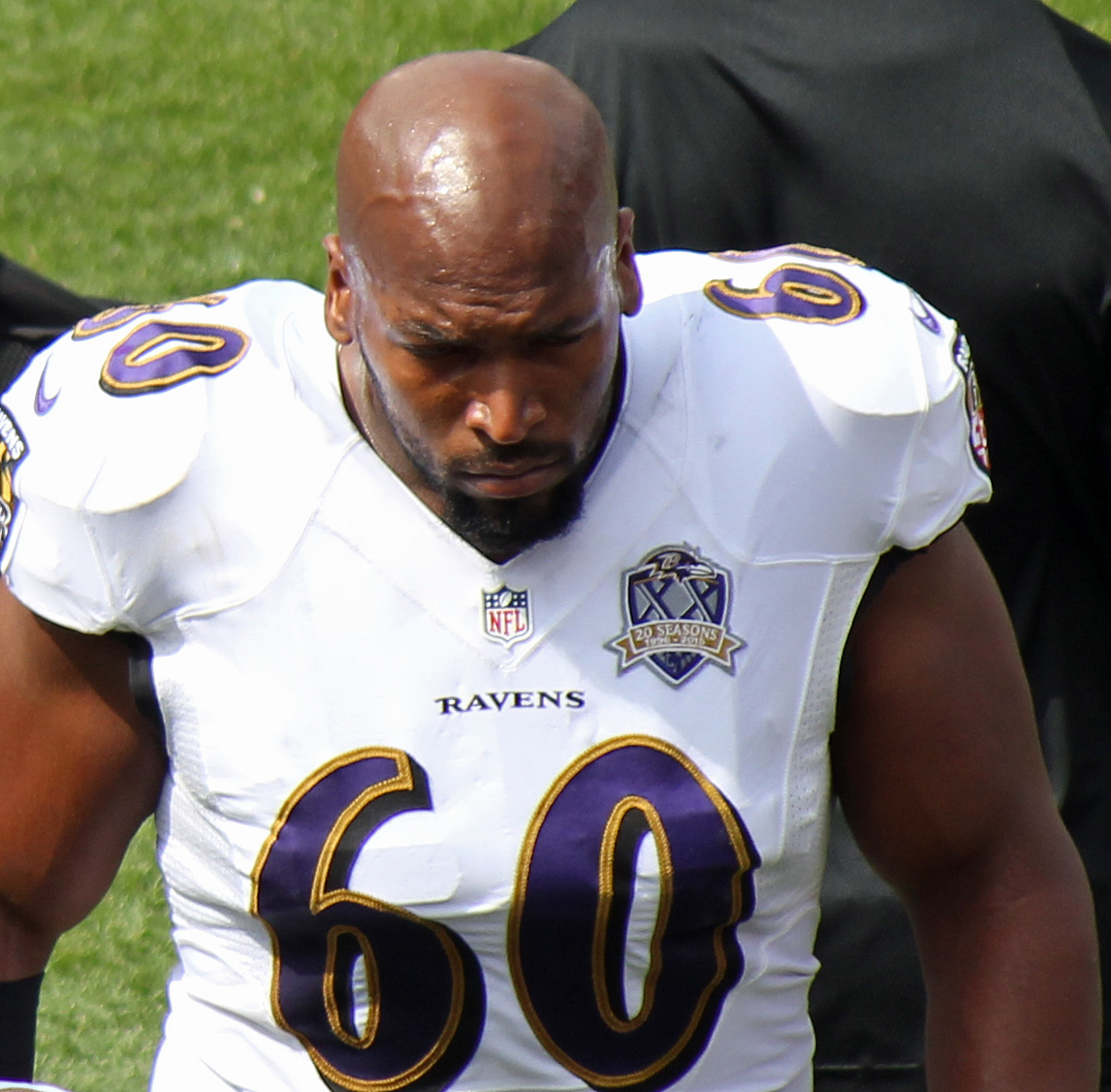
- Monroe with the Baltimore Ravens in 2015

No. 60, 75
- Position: Offensive tackle

Personal information
- Born: April 18, 1987 (age 39); Plainfield, New Jersey, U.S.
- Listed height: 6 ft 5 in (1.96 m)
- Listed weight: 300 lb (136 kg)

Career information
- High school: Plainfield (NJ)
- College: Virginia (2005–2008)
- NFL draft: 2009: 1st round, 8th overall pick

Career history
- Jacksonville Jaguars (2009–2013); Baltimore Ravens (2013–2015)

Awards and highlights
- Jacobs Blocking Trophy (2008); Second-team All-American (2008); First-team All-ACC (2008)

Career NFL statistics
- Games played: 93
- Games started: 90
- Stats at Pro Football Reference

Eugene Christopher Monroe (born April 18, 1987) is an American former professional football player who was an offensive tackle for seven seasons in the National Football League (NFL). Selected eighth overall in the 2009 NFL draft, he spent the early years of his pro career with the Jacksonville Jaguars until a trade sent him to the Baltimore Ravens during the 2013 regular season. Released by the Ravens in June 2016, Monroe announced his retirement from football one month later at the age of 29, citing concerns over head trauma sustained during his career. Monroe played college football for the Virginia Cavaliers.

Monroe is an outspoken advocate for the medical use of cannabis, and is noted for being the first active NFL player to publicly challenge league policy on the issue.

== Early life ==
Monroe played at Plainfield High School in Plainfield, New Jersey, where he was teammates with Donald Jones. A two-time first-team All-State lineman, Monroe did not allow a quarterback sack in the last three seasons of his high school career. After his senior season, Monroe participated in the U.S. Army All-American Bowl, and was recognized with Super Prep All-American, Parade All-American, and USA Today All-USA honors.

Regarded as a five-star recruit by Rivals.com, Monroe was ranked the top offensive line prospect in 2005 and third overall among all positions. "[Monroe] has everything: great footwork, balance, excels as both a run and pass blocker and is able to dominate in both the run and pass game. The perfect left tackle for some lucky college," said Tom Lemming, ESPN recruiting analyst. He chose Virginia over offers from Florida State, Miami (FL), Nebraska, and Oklahoma, among others.

== College career ==
Monroe played four seasons of college football at the University of Virginia. As a true freshman in 2005 he appeared in all 12 games, serving as a backup to D'Brickashaw Ferguson at left tackle while also spending time at right guard.

In 2006, Monroe suffered a dislocated left kneecap during April camp which required surgery. He recovered to play in all 12 games with 7 starts on the year, allowing just four quarterback pressures and no sacks.

Monroe started 11 games at left tackle in 2007, missing two games due to a sprained knee. He allowed zero sacks and only one QB pressure while leading the conference with 15 touchdown-resulting blocks, earning him an All-ACC mention from the league's coaches.

Monroe started all 12 games at left tackle in 2008, setting school records with 105 knockdowns/key blocks and 16 blocks that resulted in a touchdown. He was the recipient of the Jacobs Blocking Trophy and a unanimous All-ACC selection.

== Professional career ==
=== Pre-draft ===
Monroe was widely believed to be one of the top two offensive tackles available in the Draft (alongside Jason Smith). Particularly praised for his pass blocking ability, Monroe drew comparisons to Walter Jones. He was selected eighth overall by the Jacksonville Jaguars, a pick that was declared a "steal" by Sports Illustrated's Tony Pauline. Monroe was the third offensive lineman from Virginia selected in the top 15 of an NFL draft in four years, following D'Brickashaw Ferguson and Branden Albert.

Pre-draft measurables
| Height | Weight | Arm length | Hand span | 40-yard dash | 10-yard split | 20-yard split | 20-yard shuttle | Three-cone drill | Vertical jump | Broad jump | Bench press | Wonderlic |
|---|---|---|---|---|---|---|---|---|---|---|---|---|
| 6 ft 5 1/4 in (1.96 m) | 309 lb (140 kg) | 33 7/8 in (0.86 m) | 11 1/8 in (0.28 m) | 5.31 s | 1.89 s | 3.10 s | 4.78 s | 7.86 s | 28.5 in (0.72 m) | 9 ft 2 in (2.79 m) | 23 reps | 24 |
All values from NFL Combine

=== Jacksonville Jaguars ===
In an effort to rebuild their offensive line, the Jacksonville Jaguars selected Monroe and Eben Britton with their first two picks in the 2009 NFL draft. The pair became the first two rookie tackles to start together on opening day since the 1982 season of the St. Louis Cardinals. Monroe signed a five-year deal with the Jaguars on August 14, 2009.

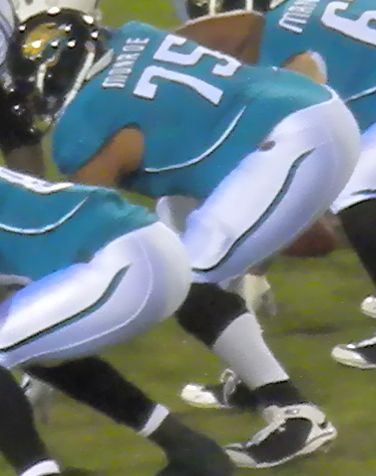
Monroe with the Jaguars in 2009

During his time in Jacksonville, Monroe established himself as a cornerstone of the Jaguars offense, starting 62 of 65 games played and missing only 3 of 68 due to injury. In 2012, he started all 16 games and was one of only two Jaguars to play every snap. Monroe was considered to be one of Jacksonville's best players when he was traded to the Baltimore Ravens four games into the 2013 season.

=== Baltimore Ravens ===
Monroe was traded from the Jacksonville Jaguars to the Baltimore Ravens on October 3, 2013, in exchange for Baltimore's fourth- and fifth-round selections in the 2014 NFL draft. Upon arriving in Baltimore, Monroe switched his uniform number to 60 due to Jonathan Ogden's #75 being unofficially retired by the Ravens. Monroe finished out the final year of his contract in 2013, then signed a new 5-year, $37.5 million deal with the Ravens on March 11, 2014.

Over the next two seasons Monroe struggled to remain healthy. He underwent arthroscopic knee surgery in September 2014 which caused him to miss four straight games. He also missed the final regular season game of 2014 and both postseason games due to an ankle injury. In 2015, Monroe played in only six games, of which he finished three. He suffered a concussion on the first offensive drive of the season and missed the next three games. A shoulder injury also caused him to miss week 8 and the last six games of the season. Monroe was place on injured reserve on December 12 and had surgery to repair his left shoulder shortly afterwards.

Monroe was released by the Ravens on June 16, 2016. He had the highest base salary on the team and had been plagued by injury problems that caused him to miss 17 of 34 regular season and postseason games the previous two years. Some have speculated, including Monroe himself, that the release may have been motivated by Monroe's vocal campaigning on the subject of league cannabis policy. Coach John Harbaugh denied this was a factor, however.

=== Retirement ===
Following his release from the Ravens, Monroe fielded interest from several NFL teams before announcing his retirement on July 21, 2016. Explaining his decision in an essay submitted to The Players' Tribune, Monroe cited the physical toll that football takes on the human body and in particular its effect on the brain, noting that signs of CTE (chronic traumatic encephalopathy) have been detected in 90% of former NFL players examined. Monroe also disclosed that he had recently noticed signs of memory loss and planned to undergo a battery of tests to evaluate his current health status. Monroe's decision followed the recent retirements of NFL players Chris Borland (March 2015), Husain Abdullah (March 2016), and A.J. Tarpley (April 2016), all of whom walked away from the game early due to neurological health concerns.

== Cannabis advocacy ==
Monroe has been an outspoken advocate for removing cannabis from the list of banned substances in the NFL. Monroe has pointed to the heavy use of addictive opioid drugs in the league and says players should not be punished for choosing a safer alternative that could help them better manage their pain. Monroe has also cited the neuroprotective properties of cannabis that could help treat and prevent the serious brain injuries and diseases that are well-documented among NFL players. Monroe has contributed funding to medical cannabis research and started a website to promote his views. He has also penned a personal essay on the subject.

Monroe has been joined by a number of retired NFL players who have attested to the medicinal benefits of cannabis and called on the league to change its stance, including Jim McMahon, Jake Plummer, Kyle Turley, Nate Jackson, Eben Britton, Leonard Marshall, and Marvin Washington. Among active players Monroe is the first to have spoken out, raising the issue for the first time in March 2016. He was later joined by Derrick Morgan of the Tennessee Titans when the two appeared together in a June 2016 interview with Katie Couric.

In June 2016, it was reported that two of the NFL's top medical personnel had requested a conference call with researchers conducting medical cannabis studies funded by Monroe. The call was also attended by Monroe himself and Jake Plummer.

In November 2016, the NFL Player's Association announced the formation of a committee to study issues of pain management among players, including the use of cannabis as treatment. Monroe was named as a founding member of the committee.

Also in November 2016, Monroe was among the signatories of an open letter addressed to the NFL, urging a change in the league's policy towards cannabis. The letter was penned by Doctors for Cannabis Regulation and signed by several other NFL players. Monroe has also served as Athletics Ambassador for DFCR and co-chair of its NFL steering committee.

Monroe was named chairman of the "Yes on 4" campaign in Maryland that was formed to support the passage of Question 4 in 2022 to legalize cannabis for recreational use. He also authored an op-ed in The Washington Post titled "The case for legalizing marijuana in Maryland".

== Personal life ==
Monroe is the youngest of 16 children in his family. He has 10 brothers and 5 sisters.

Monroe graduated with a degree in sociology from the University of Virginia in 2009. He is married to Nureya Monroe (formerly Anthony) whom he met while attending UVA.
