= Donald Jones (wide receiver) =

American football player (born 1987)

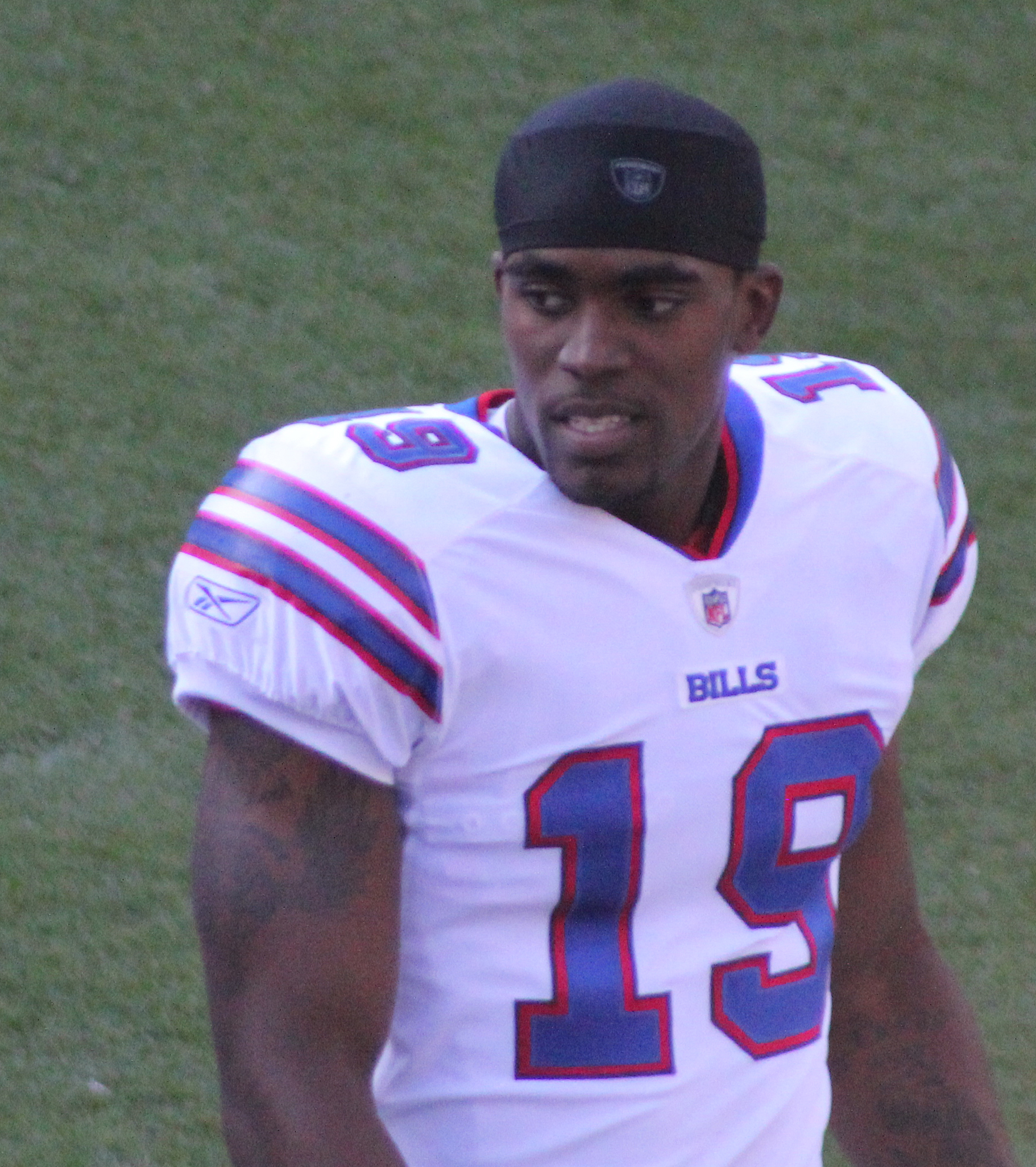
- Jones with the Bills in 2011

No. 19
- Position: Wide receiver

Personal information
- Born: December 17, 1987 (age 38); Plainfield, New Jersey, U.S.
- Listed height: 6 ft 0 in (1.83 m)
- Listed weight: 214 lb (97 kg)

Career information
- High school: Plainfield
- College: Youngstown State
- NFL draft: 2010: undrafted

Career history
- Buffalo Bills (2010−2012); New England Patriots (2013)*
- * Offseason or practice squad member only

Career NFL statistics
- Receptions: 82
- Receiving yards: 887
- Receiving average: 10.8
- Receiving touchdowns: 6
- Stats at Pro Football Reference

Donald Jones (born December 17, 1987) is an American former professional football player who was a wide receiver in the National Football League. He played college football for the Youngstown State Penguins and was signed by the Buffalo Bills as an undrafted free agent in 2010. He was also a member of the New England Patriots.

== Early life ==
Jones grew up in Plainfield, New Jersey, and attended Plainfield High School, where he was teammates with Eugene Monroe. He attended Lackawanna College prior to transferring to Youngstown State University, where he majored in broadcasting.

== Professional career ==
=== Buffalo Bills ===
Jones was signed by the Buffalo Bills as an undrafted free agent following the 2010 NFL draft. He scored his first career touchdown in week 10 of the 2010 season against the Cincinnati Bengals. Jones' time with the Bills came to an end as new coach Doug Marrone and GM Buddy Nix did not tender him a contract for the 2013-2014 season.

=== New England Patriots ===
Jones signed a three-year deal with the New England Patriots on March 15, 2013.

Jones was released by the team on July 19, 2013.

== Retirement ==
On August 7, 2013, Jones announced on his Twitter page that due to advancements in his kidney disease he would retire from the NFL.

Jones briefly played for the Somerset Patriots of the Atlantic League of Professional Baseball.

On December 17th, 2024, Donald (class of 2006) was named head football coach at his former high school in Plainfield NJ (Plainfield HS)

=== Broadcasting career ===
In 2016, Jones signed on to be co-host of The John Murphy Show, a daily talk show on WGR radio and MSG Western New York. The show is sponsored by the Buffalo Bills. He left MSG and WGR in April 2018, hoping to find work closer to his home in New Jersey, from which he had commuted throughout his two-year tenure.
