= Plainfield Public School District =

School district in Union County, New Jersey, US

Address
- 1200 Myrtle Avenue Plainfield, Union County, New Jersey, 07063; United States
- Coordinates: 40.614499°N 74.421309°W

District information
- Grades: K-12
- Established: 1847
- Superintendent: Rashon K. Hasan
- Business administrator: Cameron E. Cox
- Schools: 14
- Affiliation: Former Abbott district

Students and staff
- Enrollment: 10,097 (as of 2022–23)
- Faculty: 628.7 FTEs
- Student–teacher ratio: 16.1:1

Other information
- District Factor Group: B
- Website: www.plainfieldnjk12.org
Ind.	Per pupil	District spending	Rank (*)	K-12 average	%± vs. average
1A	Total Spending	$20,426	76	$18,891	8.1%
1	Budgetary Cost	16,539	85	14,783	11.9%
2	Classroom Instruction	9,103	69	8,763	3.9%
6	Support Services	2,911	85	2,392	21.7%
8	Administrative Cost	1,779	95	1,485	19.8%
10	Operations & Maintenance	2,501	94	1,783	40.3%
13	Extracurricular Activities	168	19	268	−37.3%
16	Median Teacher Salary	63,422	42	64,043
Data from NJDoE 2014 Taxpayers' Guide to Education Spending. *Of K-12 districts with more than 3,500 students. Lowest spending=1; Highest=103

The Plainfield Public School District is a comprehensive community public school district that serves students in kindergarten through twelfth grade from Plainfield, in Union County, in the U.S. state of New Jersey. The district is one of 31 former Abbott districts statewide that were established pursuant to the decision by the New Jersey Supreme Court in Abbott v. Burke which are now referred to as "SDA Districts" based on the requirement for the state to cover all costs for school building and renovation projects in these districts under the supervision of the New Jersey Schools Development Authority.

As of the 2022–23 school year, the district, comprised of 14 schools, had an enrollment of 10,097 students and 628.7 classroom teachers (on an FTE basis), for a student–teacher ratio of 16.1:1.

The district is classified by the New Jersey Department of Education as being in District Factor Group "B", the second lowest of eight groupings. District Factor Groups organize districts statewide to allow comparison by common socioeconomic characteristics of the local districts. From lowest socioeconomic status to highest, the categories are A, B, CD, DE, FG, GH, I and J.

== History ==
In August 2017, the district received approval from the New Jersey Schools Development Authority to construct a new elementary school that will replace the Cook and Woodland Avenue schools, which will both be demolished when the new school is completed. The new facility, which would accommodate 750 students in grades K-5, is expected to be completed in 2022 at a cost of $57 million.

In July 2023, ceremonies were held for the new Charles and Anna Booker Elementary School, a 120,000-square-foot (11,000 m^{2}) facility constructed with the assistance of the Schools Development Authority at a cost of $59.4 million.

== Schools ==
Schools in the district (with 2022–23 enrollment data from the National Center for Education Statistics) are:

Elementary schools

- DeWitt D. Barlow Elementary School (417 students; in grades K–5)
  - Wilson Aponte, principal
- Charles and Anna Booker Elementary School (NA; PreK–5)
  - Juanpablo Jimenez, principal
- Cedarbrook K-8 Center (623; K–8)
  - Tenisha L. Fort, principal
- Clinton Elementary School (413; K–5)
  - Aurora J. Hill, principal
- Frederic W. Cook Elementary School (389; K–5)
  - Caryn Cooper, principal
- Emerson Community School (509; K–5)
  - Dion A. Roach, principal
- Evergreen Elementary School (602; K–5)
  - Johan Manuel Rojas, principal
- Jefferson Elementary School (441; K–5)
  - Telaya L. Parham, principal
- Charles H. Stillman Elementary School (354; K–5)
  - Brenda Noble, principal
- Washington Community School (649; K–5)
  - Natasha M. De Jesus-Boston, principal

Middle schools

- Frank J. Hubbard Middle School (775; 6–8)
  - Olivia Rodríguez-Calderon, principal
- Maxson Middle School (818; 6–8)
  - April Morgan, principal

High schools / academies

- Pinnacle Academy High School (90; 9–12)
- Plainfield Academy for the Arts and Advanced Studies (356; 7–12)
  - Gregory K. Sneed, principal
- Plainfield High School (1,925; 9–12)
  - Shadin Belal, principal

== Administration ==
Core members of the district's administration are:

- Rashon K. Hasan, Superintendent of Schools
- Cameron E. Cox, Business Administrator and Board Secretary

== Board of education ==
The district's board of education, comprised of nine members, sets policy and oversees the fiscal and educational operation of the district through its administration. As a Type II school district, the board's trustees are elected directly by voters to serve three-year terms of office on a staggered basis, with three seats up for election each year held (since 2017) as part of the November general election. The board appoints a superintendent to oversee the district's day-to-day operations and a business administrator to supervise the business functions of the district.
