= Fenner =

Fenner may refer to:

== Surname ==
- Arthur Fenner (1745–1805), Rhode Island governor
- Charles Fenner (1884–1955), Australian geologist and educator
- Charles Erasmus Fenner (1834–1911), a justice of the Louisiana Supreme Court, in whose home Confederate President Jefferson Davis died in 1889
- Charles Erasmus Fenner Jr. (1876–1963), founding partner of New Orleans' Fenner & Beane, a brokerage firm which merged in 1941 to become Merrill Lynch, Pierce, Fenner & Beane
- Clarence Norman Fenner (1870–1949), American petrologist
- David Fenner, Scottish footballer
- Dudley Fenner (c. 1558–1587), Puritan minister
- Erasmus Darwin Fenner (1807–1866), American physician
- Francis Fenner (1811–1896), English cricketer and founder of Cambridge University's cricket ground
- Frank Fenner (1914–2010), Australian scientist
- James Fenner (1771–1846), Rhode Island governor, son of Arthur
- Mary Galentine Fenner (1839–1903), American poet and litterateur
- Maurice Fenner (1929–2015), English cricketer
- Peggy Fenner (1922–2014), British Conservative Party politician
- Shelby Fenner, actress appearing in the films Wolf Girl (2001), Local Boys (2002) and The Guardian (2006)
- Wilhelm Fenner (1891–after 1946), German cryptanalyst who worked as a Director of Cipher Department of the High Command of the Wehrmacht

== Given name ==
- Fenner Brockway (1888–1988), British politician
- Fenner Kimball, American politician

== Places ==
- Fenner Hall, a hall of residence at The Australian National University in Canberra, ACT.
- Division of Fenner, electoral division for Australian federal parliament
- Fenner, California
- Fenner, New York

== Companies ==
- Fenner (company), a British-based manufacturer of industrial belting
