= Charles E. Fenner =

American businessperson

Charles Erasmus Fenner
- Born: September 4, 1876; Guatemala City, Guatemala
- Died: November 14, 1963 (aged 87); Slidell, Louisiana, U.S.
- Other name: Charles E. Fenner II
- Education: Tulane University
- Occupation: Businessperson
- Known for: Founding Fenner & Beane, a predecessor to Merrill Lynch
- Spouse: Virginia Schriever

Charles Erasmus Fenner (1876–1963) was a businessperson in New Orleans, Louisiana, who founded Fenner & Beane, a brokerage firm which later became part of Merrill, Lynch, Pierce, Fenner, & Smith. He was a civic leader in New Orleans.

== Early life and education ==
Fenner was born to parents Darwin Ponton Fenner and Mary Amanda Fenner (née Logan) on September 4, 1876, in Guatemala City, Guatemala. (Note: The New York Times obituary, apparently incorrectly, states that he was born in New Orleans.) His father Darwin Ponton Fenner was serving as United States consul to Guatemala when Fenner was born. His father died while serving abroad, and following his father's death Fenner relocated to New Orleans, being 12 years old at the time.

Fenner attended college at Tulane University, graduating in 1896, and subsequently earned a law degree (LLB) from the University of Virginia in 1898. He then returned to New Orleans where he practiced law until 1901. At that time, Fenner began employment with various brokerage firms in New Orleans, rising to the rank of partner.

Fenner was a cousin of Louisiana Supreme Court Justice Charles Erasmus Fenner, who was notable for his role in the Plessy v. Ferguson landmark court case, among other matters.

Fenner married Virginia Schriever of New Orleans, with whom he had two daughters and one son. The son Darwin Schriever Fenner became notable in his own right for his accomplishments as a financier, civic leader and philanthropist.

== Career in business and as a civic leader ==
Fenner & Beane logo

Fenner tomb at Metairie Cemetery

With Alpheus C. Beane, Fenner co-founded the brokerage firm Fenner & Beane, which was a member of the New York Stock Exchange as of 1922. This firm went through a series of mergers, although it retained the same name. In 1941, Fenner & Beane merged with Merrill Lynch, E.A. Pierce & Cassatt Company to become Merrill Lynch, Pierce, Fenner & Beane, ultimately becoming the largest brokerage firm in the United States. Fenner remained an officer of the firm until 1950 and a major stockholder in the firm until his death. At the time of the merger, these were the two largest brokerage houses in the United States, and the merger provided Merrill Lynch with access to the commodities markets in the southeastern United States.

In civic activities, Fenner was a founding member of the International House in New Orleans, which was a predecessor to the World Trade Centers Association. He was president of the New Orleans Cotton Exchange from 1935 to 1937. He served as the first president of the Southern Eye Bank, then one of three eye banks in the United States. Fenner was president of the Eye, Ear, Nose and Throat Hospital of New Orleans and vice-president of the Audubon Park Commission.

Fenner died at his country home in Slidell, Louisiana. He is interred at Metairie Cemetery in New Orleans.

== Awards and recognition ==
External images
- Portrait of Charles E. Fenner
- “Portrait of Fenner", as published in Fenner's New York Times obituary

In 1939, Fenner was king of the New Orleans Mardi Gras. In 1948, Fenner was awarded the Loving Cup by the New Orleans Times-Picayune newspaper for his service to the local community. Also, in 1948, Fenner was named by the American Hospital Association as one of the 50 laypeople who most contributed to the health of the American people. In 1952, Fenner received a 40-year service award from the Eye, Ear, Nose and Throat Hospital of New Orleans.
