= Fenrich =

House of Fenrich
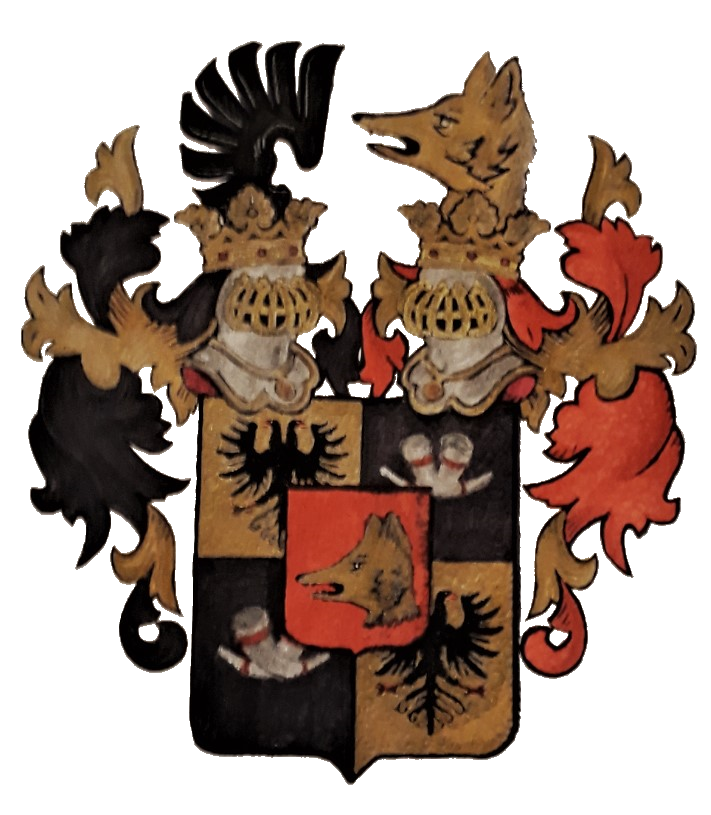
- Place of origin: Principality of Brunswick-Wolfenbüttel
- Founded: 18th century
- Founder: Achaz Eduard of Grona (1704–1758)
- Current head: Josef von Fenrich-Gjurgjenovac (b. 1940)

The Fenrich family (IPA [fεn'rɪç], alternative spellings: Fendrich, Fenrick, sometimes with preposition von) was an Austrian lower nobility family of German origin, a branch of the House of Fenner (Venner, Venour). The family flourished in the late 18th century in Meseritz in South Prussia (today Międzyrzecz, Poland) and moved to Austria-Hungary in the 19th century.

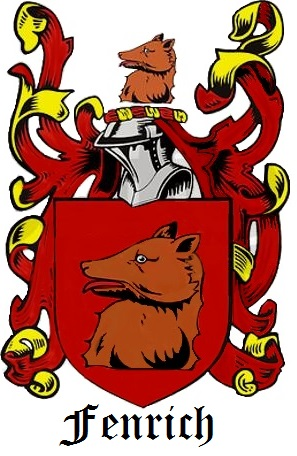
Fenrich coat of arms, issued in Wappen bürglerlicher Geschlechter Deutschlands, 1857.

== History and ancestral house(s) ==
The use of family name Fenrich was firstly attested at the beginning of the 16th century, replacing an older Middle High German form Fenner and the Alemannic form Venner. The name Fenner, however, can be traced back to a Celtic tribe Fen, originally from Austria, that began to spread throughout Europe giving rise to Fenrichs' ancestral houses Fenner and Venner (in French also Venour). Sir William Fenner and Baron La Venour are recorded in the Domesday Book, which was a record of all the landowners in England, as ordered by king William in 1086.

Throughout the 18th and 19th century, Fenrichs became closely related to the House of Ochsenreither von Jockgrim by means of multiple intermarriages.

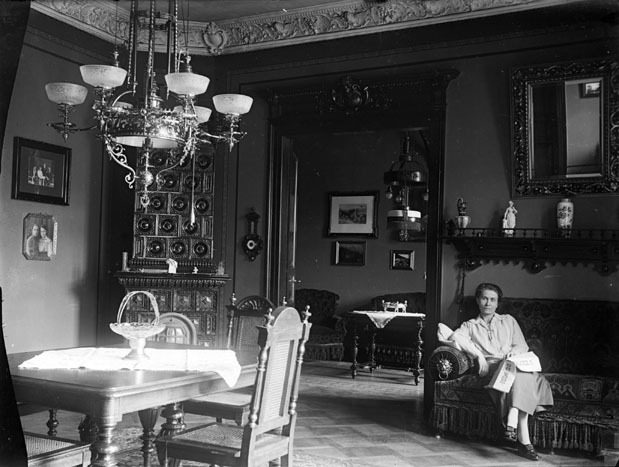
Dining hall of the Fenrich palace in Bingen am Rhein, Germany.

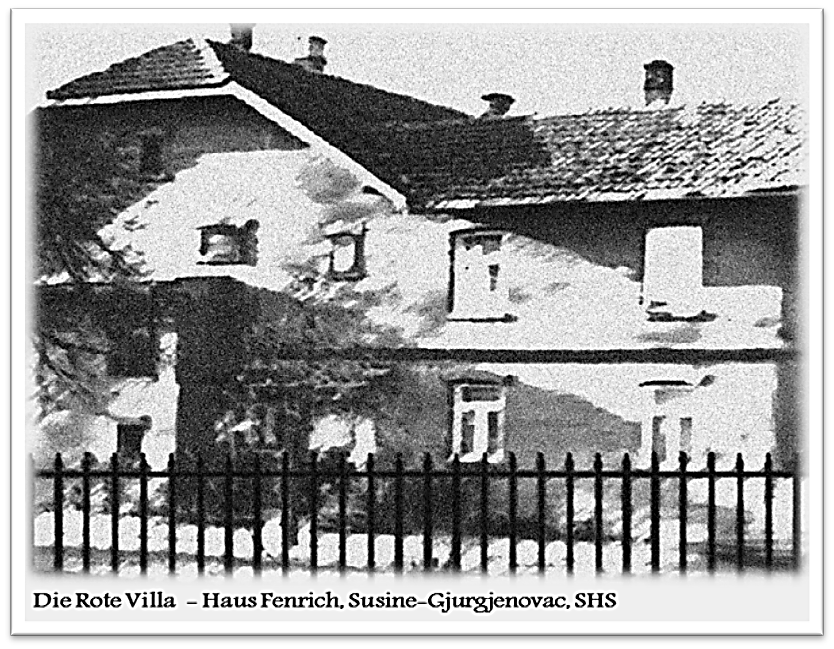
Manor house in Susine-Gjurgjenovac, (present-day Croatia), was a residence of the Austrian branch of the family until 1945.

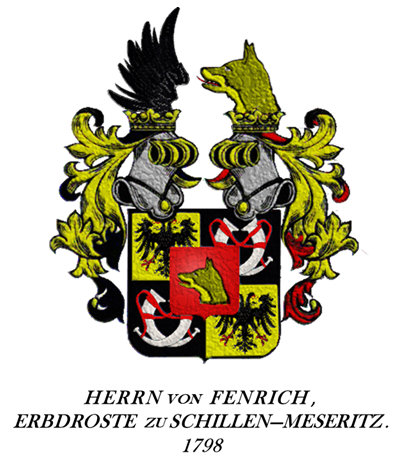
Augmented coat of arms featuring the original red shield with a golden fox head as an inescutcheon.

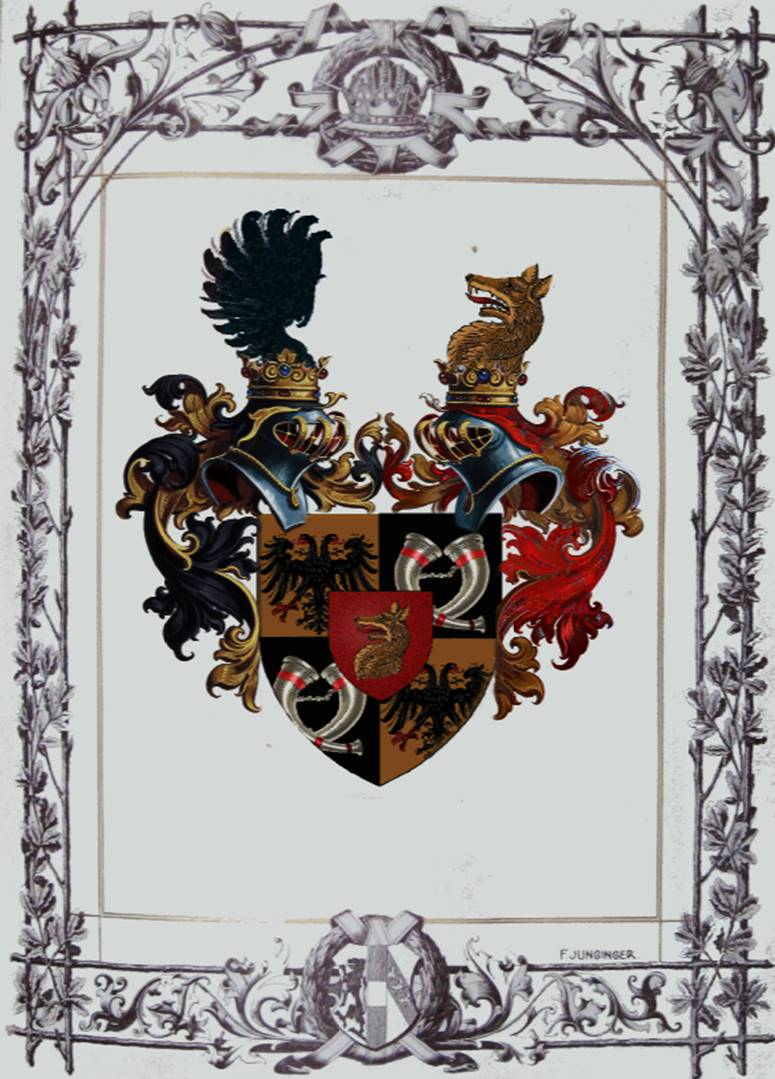
Coat of arms from the confirmation of nobility granted to Joseph von Fenrich in 1913 by Francis Joseph I of Austria.

The founder of the family was Achatius Eduardus de Chrona (in German Achaz Eduard von Grone), born in 1704 in Kirchbrak, Lower Saxony, a son of Heinrich Albrecht von Grone (1663–1726) and Anna Lucia von Mengersen (1670–1721). In 1724 Achaz was appointed Fähndrich (bannerman, ensign) in the Margraviate of Hessen-Caserlisch, and later served as a high-princely Drost of Lüneburg-Wolfenbüttel. The title of Drost denotes an overseer or custodian, a legal officer to whom some degree of authority or jurisdiction is given by the local ruler (i.e. Hochfürst – High Prince). In 1730 Achaz married Maria Elisabetha Fenner von Fenneberg (1699–1756), the only child from the marriage of Peter Anton Fenner von Fenneberg (1661–1730) and Ursula Rütter von Maliss (1671–1699). The offspring of Achaz and Maria adopted the name Fenrich/Fennerich. Ostrognay claimed that this surname was derived from Achaz's byname, based upon his military rank ‘Fendrich’ (modern standard German spelling is Fähnrich).

In 1730s the family members became land owners (Junkers) in Schillen-Meseritz, and as ethnically Germans, they were in favor of newly established Prussian government over the Meseritz County. In the 1790s, many German settlers came to the county, replacing the Polish farmers that used to live and work there before the annexation. In 1798 king Frederick William III of Prussia, appointed Christian Eduard von Fenrich and his brother Johann Leopold as Schulze (managers, overseers) of the Meseritz County.

Fenrichs were considered Junkers, but until the 1798 they most likely didn't possess the formal patents or grants issued by the king. As early as 1770s, Heinrich Michael von Fenrich started bearing a completely new coat of arms that didn't resemble those of his ancestors. There are no records that could confirm that this coat of arms was actually granted by the ruler, so the tendency is to believe the arms were self-assumed. This early form of coat of arms consisted of a red shield with a golden fox head. In 1801 the king and his Court issued a patent of confirmation of noble status (Anerkennung des früher verliehenen Adelsstandes) with a new, augmented coat of arms, incorporating the old one featuring the fox. In addition to that, the brothers Christian Eduard and Johann Leopold were granted titles of Erbschultheiss (Erbdroste). This is basically the same as Schulze, but the latter title is hereditary.

In 1807 the Meseritz County was briefly returned to Poland following the founding of Duchy of Warsaw by Napoleon. The latter was an issue since the title of Erbschultheiss was not recognized by the new government, and in the following eight years Fenrichs had right to manage only their family estate in Schillen, whereas the county land was managed by the Duchy of Warsaw directly. In 1871, following the unification of German lands into the German Empire, the title of Erbschultheiss became largely symbolic. A branch of the family emigrated in the late 19th century to the Kingdom of Hungary where they briefly owned Susine-Gjurgjenovac estate in Slavonia (present-day Croatia).

== Prominent members ==
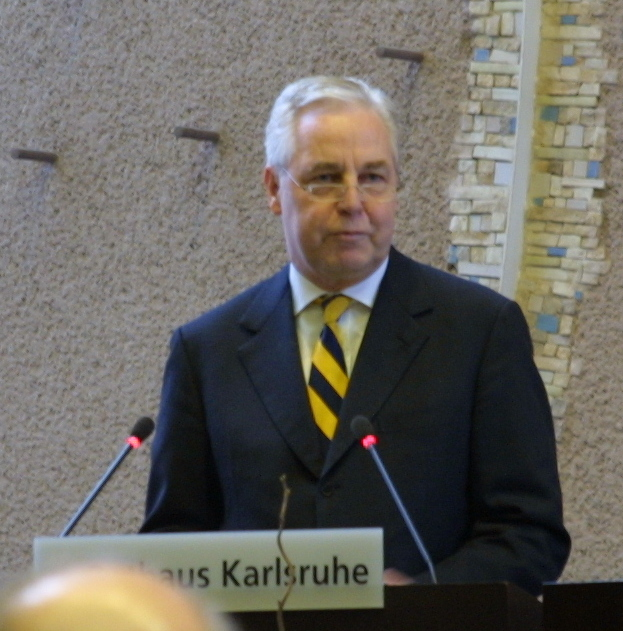
Heinz Fenrich, the Lord mayor of Karlsruhe, Germany (1998–2013)

- Heinrichus Fenrich von Baden-Durlach
- Heinz Fenrich, German politician (CDU)
- Andrew Fenrich, US politician (Democratic Party)
- Mari Fenrich-Hulman, US philanthropist
- Anna Eller (born Fenrich de Gjurgjenovac), pianist
- Ellen Fenrich, German politician (AfD)
- Andrea Fenrich de Gjurgjenovac, Croatian model
- Robert Fenrich de Gjurgjenovac, Croatian contemporary artist
- Melanie Fenrich, German book author
