= Richmond P. Davis =

US Army major general (1866–1837)

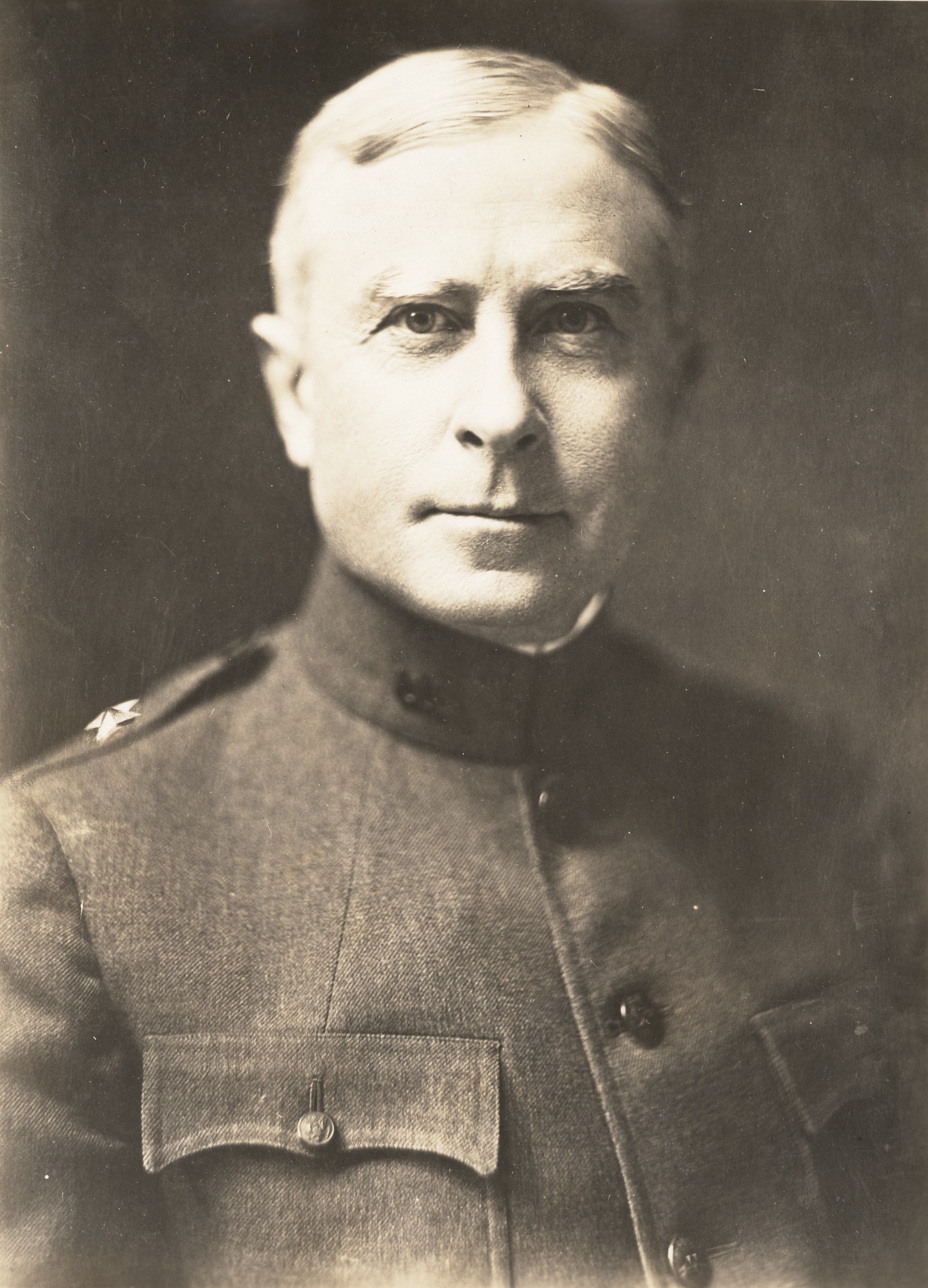
- Davis in 1918
- Born: 23 June 1866; Statesville, North Carolina, US
- Died: 15 September 1937 (aged 71); Washington, DC, US
- Burial place: Arlington National Cemetery
- Education: United States Military Academy
- Spouse: Bertha Marie Bouvier (m. 1889–1937)
- Relatives: Richmond Mumford Pearson (grandfather); Richmond Pearson (uncle)
- Military career
- Service: United States Army
- Service years: 1887–1929
- Rank: Major General
- Service number: 0-111
- Units: US Army Field Artillery Branch; US Army Coast Artillery Corps
- Commands: 54th Coast Artillery Company; US Army Coast Artillery School; Fort H. G. Wright; Artillery District of New London; Fort Winfield Scott; Coast Artillery Defenses of San Francisco; 162nd Field Artillery Brigade; 151st Field Artillery Brigade; IX Corps Artillery; Coast Artillery Defenses of Manila; Coast Artillery Training Center; Coast Artillery Defenses of Chesapeake Bay; 22nd Infantry Brigade; Hawaiian Separate Coast Artillery Brigade; Coast Artillery District of Hawaii; Ninth Corps Area Artillery; Fourth Corps Area
- Conflicts: Spanish–American War; World War I Occupation of the Rhineland
- Awards: Army Distinguished Service Medal
- Other work: Vice president, Fenner & Beane; President, Harriman & Keech

Richmond Pearson Davis (23 June 1866 – 15 September 1937) was a career officer in the United States Army. An 1887 graduate of the United States Military Academy, Davis served until 1929 and attained the rank of major general. A veteran of the Spanish–American War, World War I, and Occupation of the Rhineland, he was a recipient of the Army Distinguished Service Medal. After his military retirement, Davis was a financial services company executive and served as vice president of Fenner & Beane and president of Harriman & Keech.

A native of Statesville, North Carolina, Davis was educated at the city's academy and attended the Bingham School. An 1887 graduate of the United States Military Academy (West Pont), after receiving his commission he embarked on a long career, first with the Field Artillery, and later with the Coast Artillery. A longtime faculty member at West Point both before and after the Spanish–American War, during the war he performed recruiting duty in Charlotte, North Carolina, then served with the coastal defense garrison at Fort Caswell, North Carolina.

Davis continued to advance through the ranks in positions of increased responsibility, and he commanded several Coast Artillery forts and districts. During World War I and the post-war Occupation of the Rhineland, he successively commanded the 162nd Field Artillery Brigade, 151st Field Artillery Brigade, and IX Corps Artillery. In 1922, his wartime service was recognized with award of the Army Distinguished Service Medal.

Davis continued to command Coast Artillery districts and brigades after the war, and rose to the rank of major general. He commanded the Fourth Corps Area before retiring in 1929. After leaving the army, Davis pursued a career in financial services as vice president of Fenner & Beane, and later president of Harriman & Keech. He died in Washington, DC and was buried at Arlington National Cemetery.

== Early life ==
Richmond P. Davis was born in Statesville, North Carolina on 23 June 1866, a son of Mary Williams (Pearson) Davis and Confederate veteran Elnathan Hayne Davis, who was known as Hayne. US Representative Richmond Pearson was his uncle, and Richmond Mumford Pearson, who served as chief justice of the North Carolina Supreme Court, was his grandfather. Davis's aunt Ellen Brent (Pearson) Fowle, who died in 1862, was the first wife of Daniel Gould Fowle, who served as North Carolina's governor from 1889 to 1891. Davis was educated at Statesville Male Academy and was a graduate of the Bingham School. In 1883, he received an appointment to the United States Military Academy at West Point from Congressman Tyre York. He graduated in 1887 ranked six of 64 and received his commission as a second lieutenant of Field Artillery.

Among Davis's classmates who also became general officers and served with him during the First World War were: Charles B. Wheeler; George O. Squier; Ernest Hinds; Charles H. Martin; Nathaniel F. McClure; William C. Rivers; William Weigel; Thomas G. Hanson; Herman Hall; Marcus D. Cronin; Alexander L. Dade; Charles S. Farnsworth; Charles Gerhardt; James T. Dean; Ulysses G. McAlexander; Edmund Wittenmyer; Frederic D. Evans; Michael J. Lenihan; Mark L. Hersey; Frank H. Albright; George W. Gatchell; Edward C. Young; Edgar Russel; and P. D. Lochridge. Among his notable classmates who did not attain general officer rank were Wirt Robinson, who retired as a colonel and became a college professor, and John Hanks Alexander, one of the first black West Point graduates, who died in 1894 while serving as a second lieutenant.

== Start of career ==
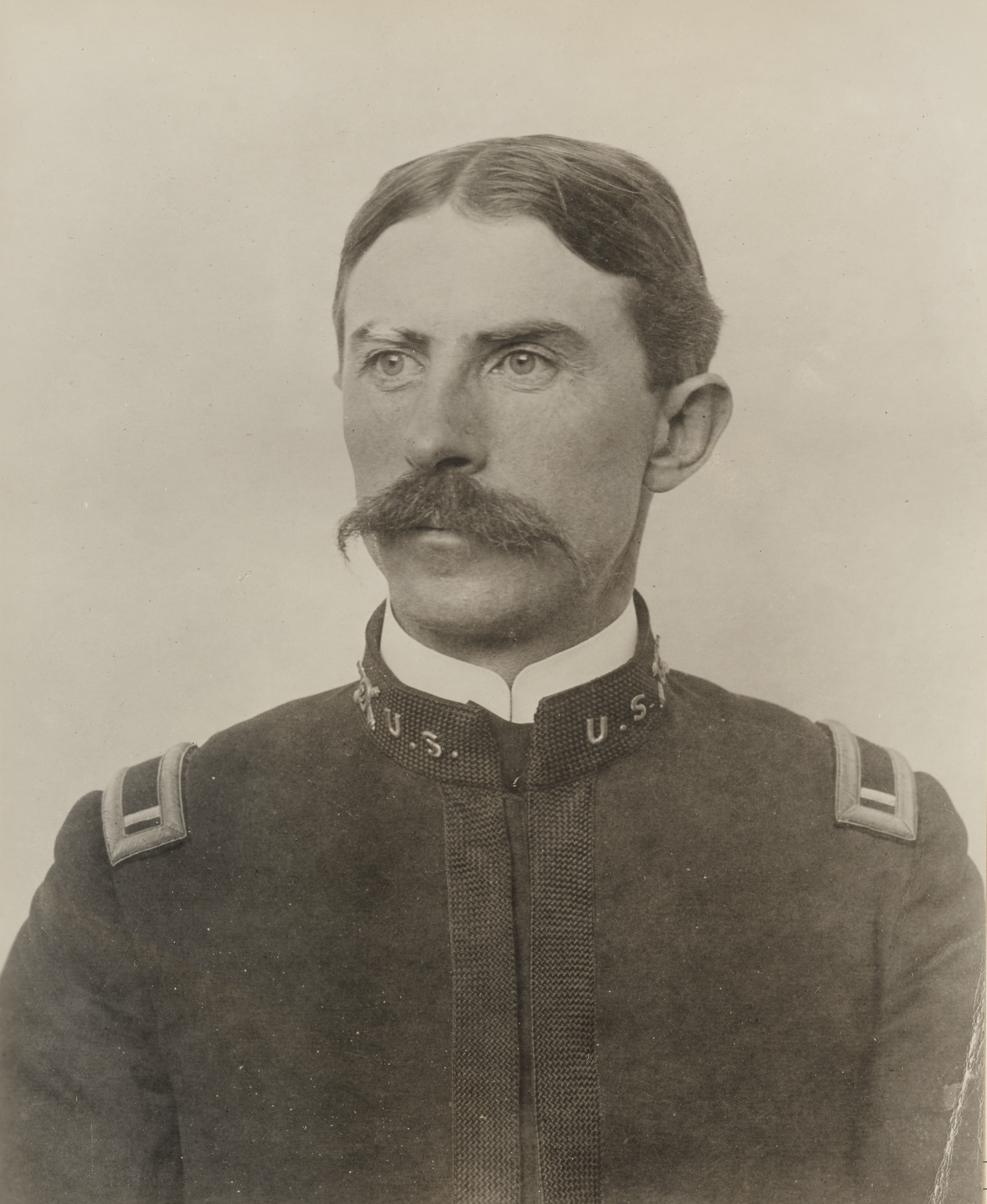
Davis c. 1893

After receiving his commission, David was assigned to the 2nd Artillery Regiment at Jackson Barracks, Louisiana. In September 1888 he was posted to Fort Wadsworth, New York. From November 1888 to June 1889, he attended the School of Submarine Defense at Fort Totten, New York. ("Torpedoes" were underwater mines used for harbor defense.) After graduating, he returned to the garrison at Fort Wadsworth, where he remained until May 1890. In June 1889, he married Bertha Marie Bouvier; they were married until his death and had no children. Her sister Laura was the wife of Brigadier General William Hemple Arthur. He was next assigned to the garrison at Fort Schuyler, New York, where he served until August 1891. Davis was next posted to West Point, where he served on the faculty as an instructor in Chemistry, Mineralogy, and Geology. He was promoted to first lieutenant in the 2nd Artillery in March 1893 and continued to serve on the West Point faculty, where was an assistant professor of Chemistry, Mineralogy, and Geology from August 1894 to August 20, 1897.

After his faculty assignment at West Point, Davis served with the garrison at Fort Monroe, Virginia until March 1898. Following the start of the Spanish–American War, he was assigned to special recruiting duty in Charlotte, North Carolina, where he served until April 1898. From August to April 1898, he served on coastal defense duty with the garrison at Fort Caswell, North Carolina. After the war's end, Davis returned his position on the West Point faculty, where he remained until January 1904. In February 1901, he was promoted to captain of Coast Artillery. From January 1904 to August 1906, he served at Fort Totten as an instructor at the School Submarine Defense and a member of the army's Torpedo Board, which tested, evaluated, and made procurement recommendations for undersea mines. At the same time, he served as district artillery engineer and commander of the 54th Coast Artillery Company.

== Continued career ==
From August 1906 to July 1907, Davis served another tour on the West Point faculty as assistant professor of Chemistry, Mineralogy, and Geology and he was promoted to major in January 1907. From July 1907 to March 1911 he served at Fort Monroe as director of the Coast Artillery School and president of the Artillery Board that made recommendations for improving the army's coastal defense facilities and weapons. Davis was promoted to lieutenant colonel in March 1911. He served in Galveston, Texas with the 2nd Provisional Coast Artillery Regiment from March to July 1911. He was then assigned as an instructor at the Coast Artillery School, where he served in July and August 1911. In September 1911, he began attendance at the United States Army War College, from which he graduated in December.

After completing the course at the war college, Davis served on the staff of the Chief of Staff of the United States Army until May 1912. He was then posted to Fort H. G. Wright, New York, where he served as commander of the post and the Artillery District of New London from May 1912 to October 1913. From October 1913 to July 1914, he was assigned to command of the post at Fort Winfield Scott, California and the Coast Artillery Defenses of San Francisco. He was promoted to colonel in January 1914. From July 1914 to October 1916, Davis served as assistant to the army's Chief of Coast Artillery. He then returned to command of Fort Winfield Scott and San Francisco's coastal defenses, where he remained until August 1917.

== Later career ==
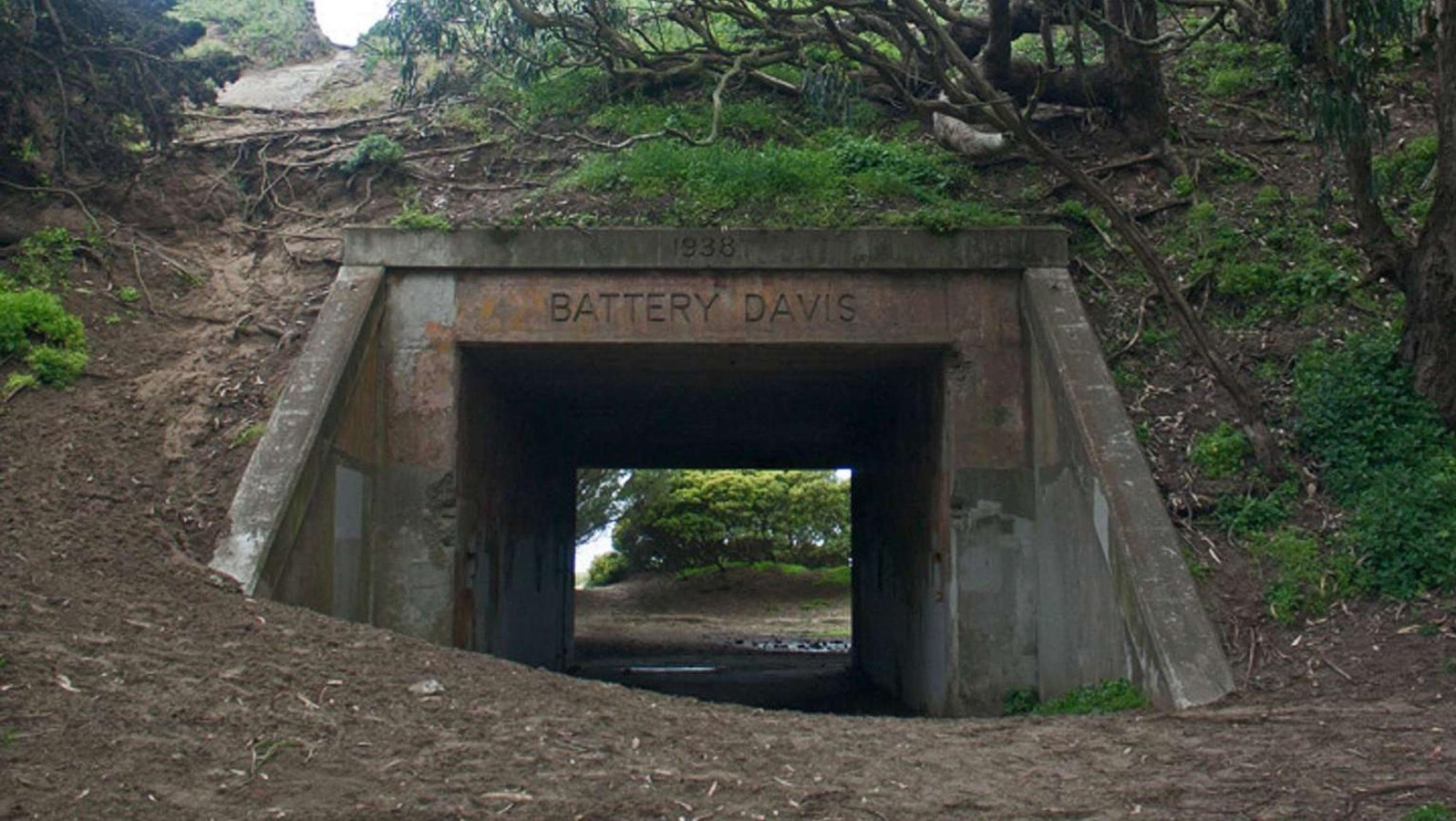
Battery Davis, California, 1938

With the army expanding after American entry into World War I in April 1917, Davis was promoted to temporary brigadier general in August. He served at Camp Pike, Arkansas as commander of the 162nd Field Artillery Brigade from September 1917 to June 1918. Davis remained in command when the brigade was reassigned to Fort Dix, New Jersey for additional training. The 162nd Field Artillery Brigade arrived in France in August 1918, and Davis remained in command until September, when he was transferred to command of the 151st Field Artillery Brigade. He continued in command of the 151st through the Armistice of November 11, 1918 that ended the war, including participation in the Battle of Saint-Mihiel. Davis then commanded the IX Corps Artillery, which was still undergoing organization and training when Germany surrendered; he remained in Europe during the post-war Occupation of the Rhineland and returned to the United States in January 1919.

Davis was on a leave of absence from January to April 1919. He was then assigned to command the Coast Artillery Defenses of Manila, Philippines, where he served from May 1919 to April 1921. In March 1920, he reverted to his permanent rank of colonel. Upon returning from the Philippines, he was assigned to Fort Monroe as commander of the Coast Artillery Training Center and the Coast Artillery Defenses of Chesapeake Bay. In November and December 1921, Davis completed a course for senior officers at Fort Benning, Georgia's US Army Infantry School, and he was promoted to permanent brigadier general while he was a student. From December 1922 to March 1926, he served at Schofield Barracks, Hawaii Territory as commander of the Coast Artillery District of Hawaii, the 22nd Infantry Brigade, and the Hawaiian Separate Coast Artillery Brigade. From March 1926 to July 1927, Davis served at the Presidio of San Francisco, California, where he commanded the Ninth Corps Area Artillery. He was promoted to major general in October 1927, and from October 1927 to August 1929, he commanded the Fourth Corps Area in Atlanta, Georgia. From August to December 1929, Davis served on the War Department staff in Washington, D.C. He then requested retirement, which was approved on 22 December 1929, about six months before he would have reached the mandatory retirement age of 64.

In San Francisco, Davis was a member of the Bohemian Club and Burlingame Country Club. In Washington, Davis belonged to the Army and Navy Club, Metropolitan Club, and Chevy Chase Club. He was also a member of the Saint Nicholas Society of the City of New York. After retiring from the army, Davis resided in Washington, D.C. and started a second career in financial services. He was vice president of Fenner & Beane from 1930 to 1936. From 1936 until his death, he was president of Harriman & Keech Investments. Davis died in Washington on 15 September 1937. He was buried at Arlington National Cemetery.

== Awards ==
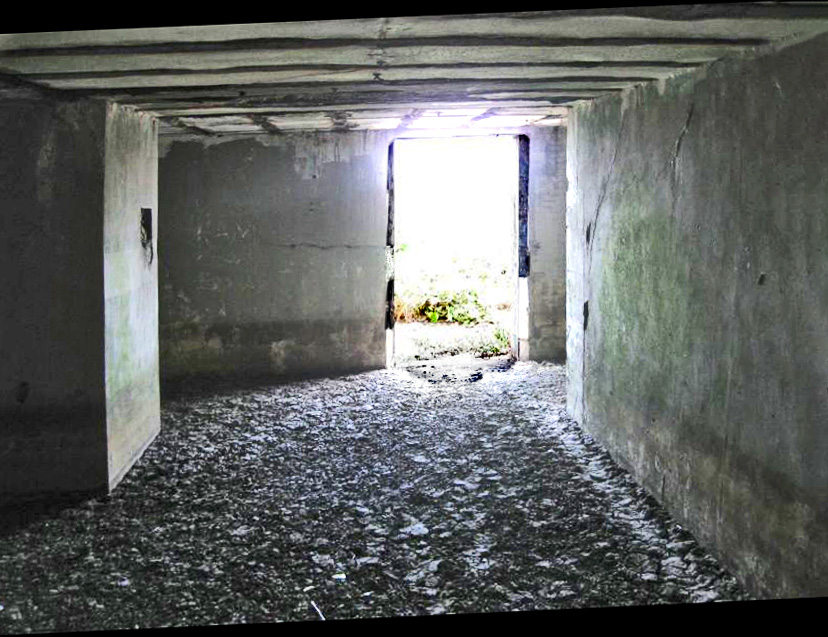
Interior of the remains of Battery Davis, Texas

Davis received the Army Distinguished Service Medal for his service during the First World War. The citation read:

The President of the United States of America, authorized by Act of Congress, July 9, 1918, takes pleasure in presenting the Army Distinguished Service Medal to Brigadier General Richmond Pearson Davis, United States Army, for exceptionally meritorious and distinguished services to the Government of the United States, in a duty of great responsibility during World War I, as Acting Chief of the 9th Corps Artillery, in which position his direction of Artillery employment and his intelligent comment on its employment by subordinate commanders was conspicuous.

Service: United States Army Rank: Brigadier General Division: 9th Corps Artillery, American Expeditionary Forces Action Date: World War I Orders: War Department, General Orders No. 19 (1922)

=== Legacy ===
Davis was a recognized expert in the technical development of coastal defenses using fixed artillery batteries. In addition, he was credited with originating a system of underwater mines for use against submarines in harbor defenses. Camp Davis, a World War II training site for anti-aircraft artillery, was named for Davis. Battery Davis, a Coast Artillery site at Fort Funston, California, was named in Davis's honor, as was Battery Richmond P. Davis at Fort Travis, Texas.

== Dates of rank ==
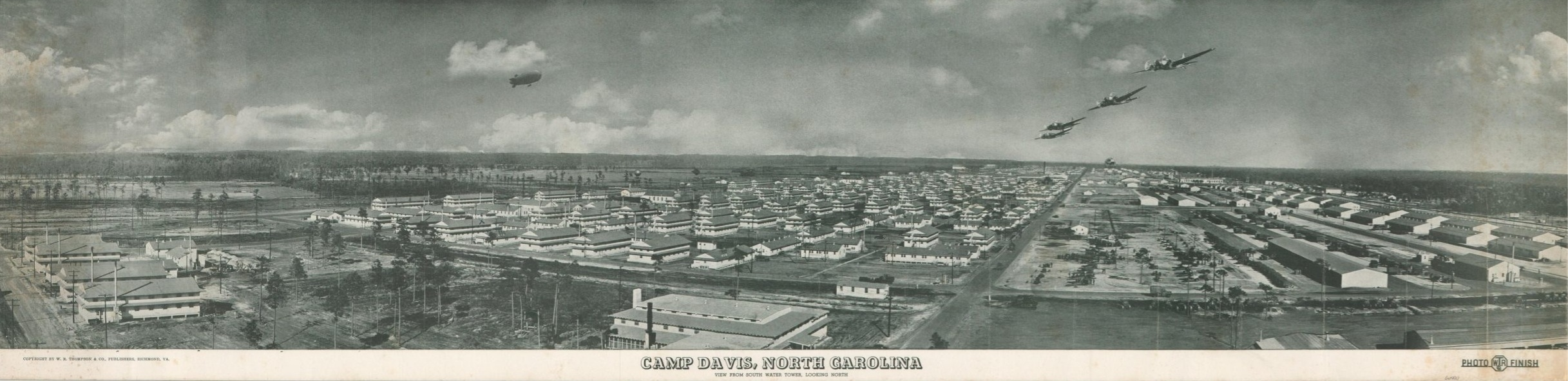
Camp Davis, North Carolina. Portion of camp, c. 1943.

Davis's effective dates of rank were:

- Major General, 4 October 4, 1927
- Brigadier General, 1 December 1922
- Colonel, 16 March 1920
- Brigadier General (Temporary), 5 August 1917
- Colonel, 24 January 1914
- Lieutenant Colonel, 13 March 1911
- Major, 25 January 1907
- Captain, 2 February 1901
- First Lieutenant, 23 March 1893
- Second Lieutenant, 12 June 1887
