= Winvian =

Coordinates: 41°41′49″N 73°12′07″W

Winvian Farm is a 113-acre (0.46 km^{2}) private, luxury resort located in Morris, Connecticut.

== History ==
Winthrop H. Smith, a founding partner of Merrill Lynch, and his wife, Vivian, purchased a 113-acre Connecticut farm in 1948, naming it "Winvian", after their combined names. Their son, Winthrop H. Smith Jr. inherited the property and, with his wife, Maggie, commissioned the building of 18 individual architectural cottages on the property, completed in 2006. Winvian became wholly owned by Maggie Smith, who operates it as a boutique hotel with Smith grandchildren, daughter Heather Smith, as managing director, and son Win Smith III, as director of sales and marketing.

== Property ==
Winvian Farm, located in the Litchfield Hills of Connecticut contains eighteen individualized cottages and one master suite, is a private Relais & Chateaux, AAA 5-Diamond Hotel & Restaurant which utilized no fewer than fifteen architects on the project. Each cottage has its own unique design based on each architect's vision to serve as a homage to Connecticut. For example, the Helicopter Cottage houses a 17,000 pounds (7,700 kg) U.S. Coast Guard Sikorsky Sea King Pelican HH3F rescue helicopter in a guest bedroom equipped with all the amenities. Others include a Masonic-style temple, a lighthouse, a treehouse, a cave.

== Media coverage ==
Winvian has been featured on the Travel Channel's feature, Extreme Mind Blowing Hotels. The show profiled some of the most unusual hotels in the United States. Each of the ten hotels featured had unique themes that set them apart.
