= Sikorsky S-61R =

Helicopter used in transport or search and rescue

S-61R/CH-3C/E HH-3E Jolly Green Giant HH-3F "Pelican"
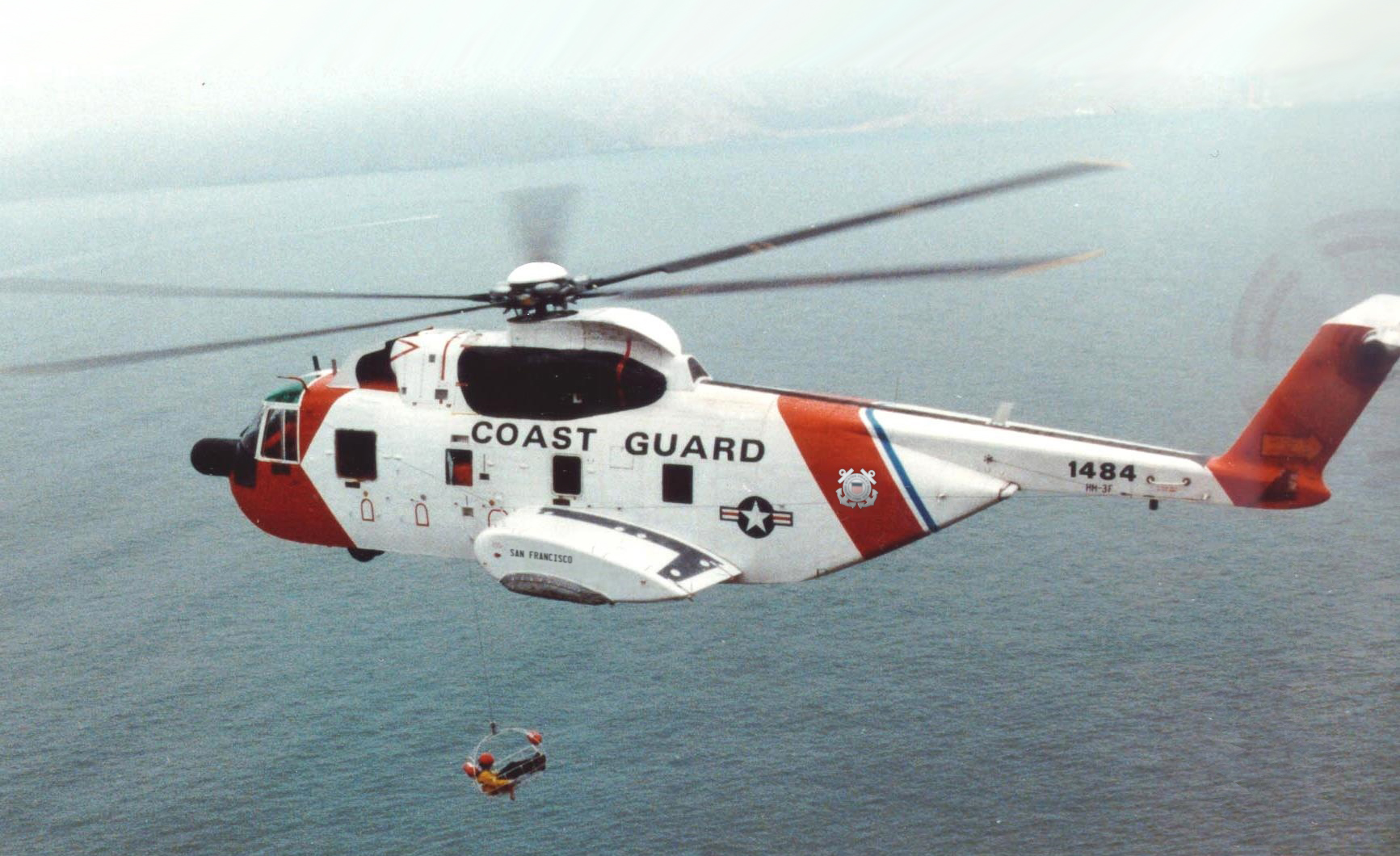
- US Coast Guard HH-3F "Pelican" from Coast Guard Air Station San Francisco

General information
- Type: Medium-lift transport/Search and Rescue (SAR) helicopter
- Manufacturer: Sikorsky; Agusta
- Status: In service
- Primary users: United States Air Force (Historical) United States Coast Guard (Historical); Italian Air Force (Historical); Tunisian Air Force

History
- Manufactured: 1963–1970s
- Introduction date: 1965
- First flight: 1963
- Developed from: Sikorsky SH-3 Sea King

The Sikorsky S-61R is a twin-engine helicopter used in transport or search and rescue roles. A developed version of the S-61 (the SH-3 Sea King), the S-61R was also built under license by Agusta as the AS-61R. The S-61R served in the United States Air Force as the CH-3C/E Sea King and the HH-3E Jolly Green Giant, and with the United States Coast Guard as the HH-3F, nicknamed "Pelican". This article covers several different variants of this type in different roles, one major difference of the S-61R compared to the S-61 was a rear ramp.

The S-61R is recognized for its Search and Rescue and cargo hauling abilities.

== Development ==
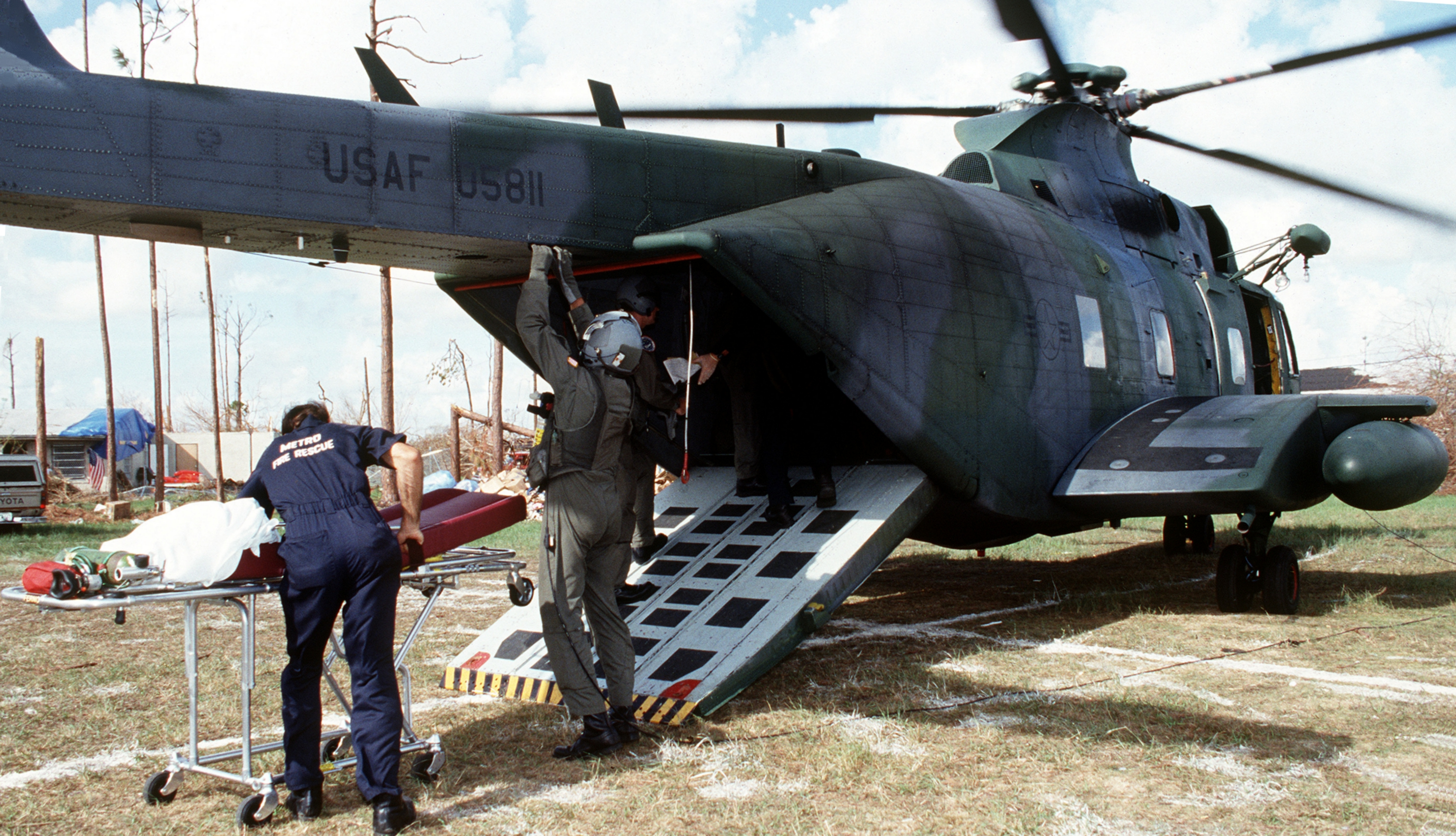
The S-61R type, in this case an HH-3E has a rear ramp, shown here open to load a patient (1992)

The Sikorsky S-61R was developed as a derivative of their S-61/SH-3 Sea King model. It features a substantially revised fuselage with a rear loading ramp, a conventional, though watertight, hull instead of the S-61's boat-hull, and retractable tricycle landing gear. The fuselage layout was used by Sikorsky for the larger CH-53 variants, and by the much later (though similarly sized) S-92.

In 1957, Sikorsky engineers were working on a new model for the United States Navy to replace the HUS-1s, used for anti-submarine warfare. Designated the HSS-2 (Helicopter, anti-Submarine, Sikorsky) under the old designation system, this helicopter would enter service as the SH-3 Sea King under the new tri-service designation system. On 9 January 1958, General Randolph M. Pate, Commandant of the Marine Corps, wrote to the Chief of Naval Operations (CNO) requesting procurement of modified HSS-2s to replace the Marines' HUS-1 helicopters. General Pate recommended that the transport version be designated the HR3S (Helicopter, Transport-3-Sikorsky). Funds for aircraft procurement were short in 1958 and progress on the design of the HR3S was slow. Detailed specifications for the new helicopter were published by CNO on 7 March 1960. Four items were specified:

- a rear loading ramp
- fuselage capable of landing in water
- ready for operational evaluation by 1963
- a modification of a helicopter that had already been developed

While the design of the assault transport version was in final review, the HSS-2 was being tested. Problems were encountered with its stability and the main transmission was limited to 2,000 horsepower, even though at peak power the engines could produce more. In July 1959, before the selection of the HR3S, Vertol Aircraft Corporation had given presentations to the Marines of their new model, the 107A, and in late March 1960, with Sikorsky engineers still wrestling with problems in the HSS-2 and designing a ramp for the HR3S, Vertol dispatched a YHC-1A (an early prototype of the 107) to the Landing Force Development Center at Marine Corps Base Quantico, for assessment by six Marine pilots. The Marine assessment endorsed the acquisition of the Vertol 107M. On 20 February 1962, the Marines selected the Vertol 107M as the winner of the HRX competition, and it entered Marine service as the CH-46 Sea Knight.

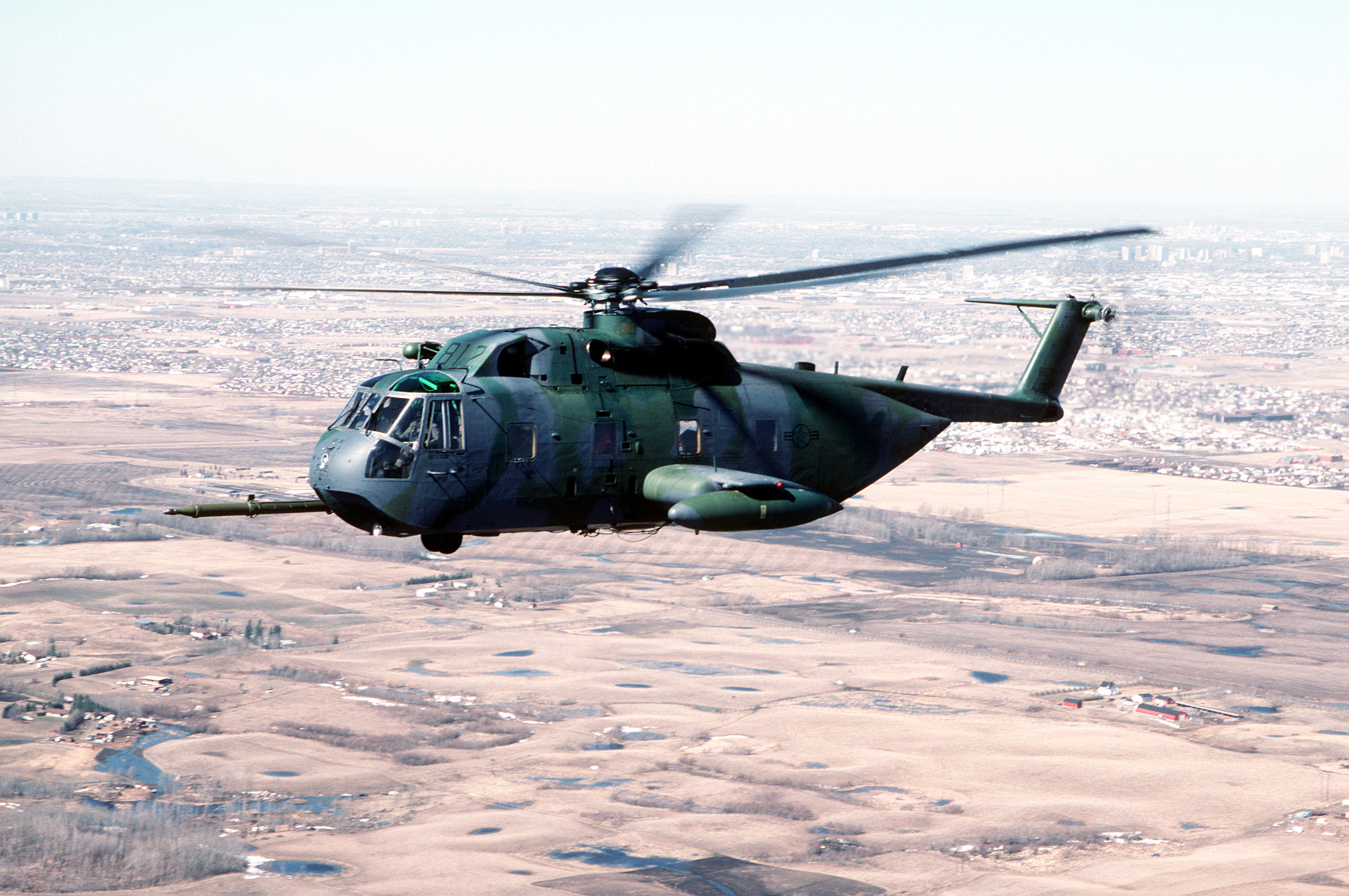
A USAF HH-3E Jolly Green Giant helicopter flies over Canada.

Notwithstanding the loss of the HRX competition, Sikorsky built an S-61R prototype as a private venture, with its first flight in 1963. During its development, the US Air Force placed an order for the aircraft, which was designated CH-3C using the new system. The Air Force used the CH-3C to recover downed pilots. The CH-3E variant with more powerful engines would follow in 1965.

The improved HH-3E variant would follow later, with eight built, and with all 50 CH-3Es converted to this standard. Known as the Jolly Green Giant (because of its size and olive green color scheme; alluding to the Jolly Green Giant company mascot), the HH-3E featured protective armor, self-sealing tanks, a retractable inflight refueling probe, jettisonable external tanks, a high-speed hoist, and other specialized equipment.

In 1965, the U.S. Coast Guard ordered a version designated HH-3F Sea King (more commonly known by its nickname "Pelican") for all-weather air-sea rescue. The Pelican featured search radar with a nose antenna radome offset to port, and water landing capability.

Italian Agusta built a S-61R variant under license, named AS-61R. Agusta produced 22 helicopters for the Italian Air Force. The company claimed it could re-open the production line in 36 months to build additional AS-61 helicopters.

== Operational service ==
=== United States ===
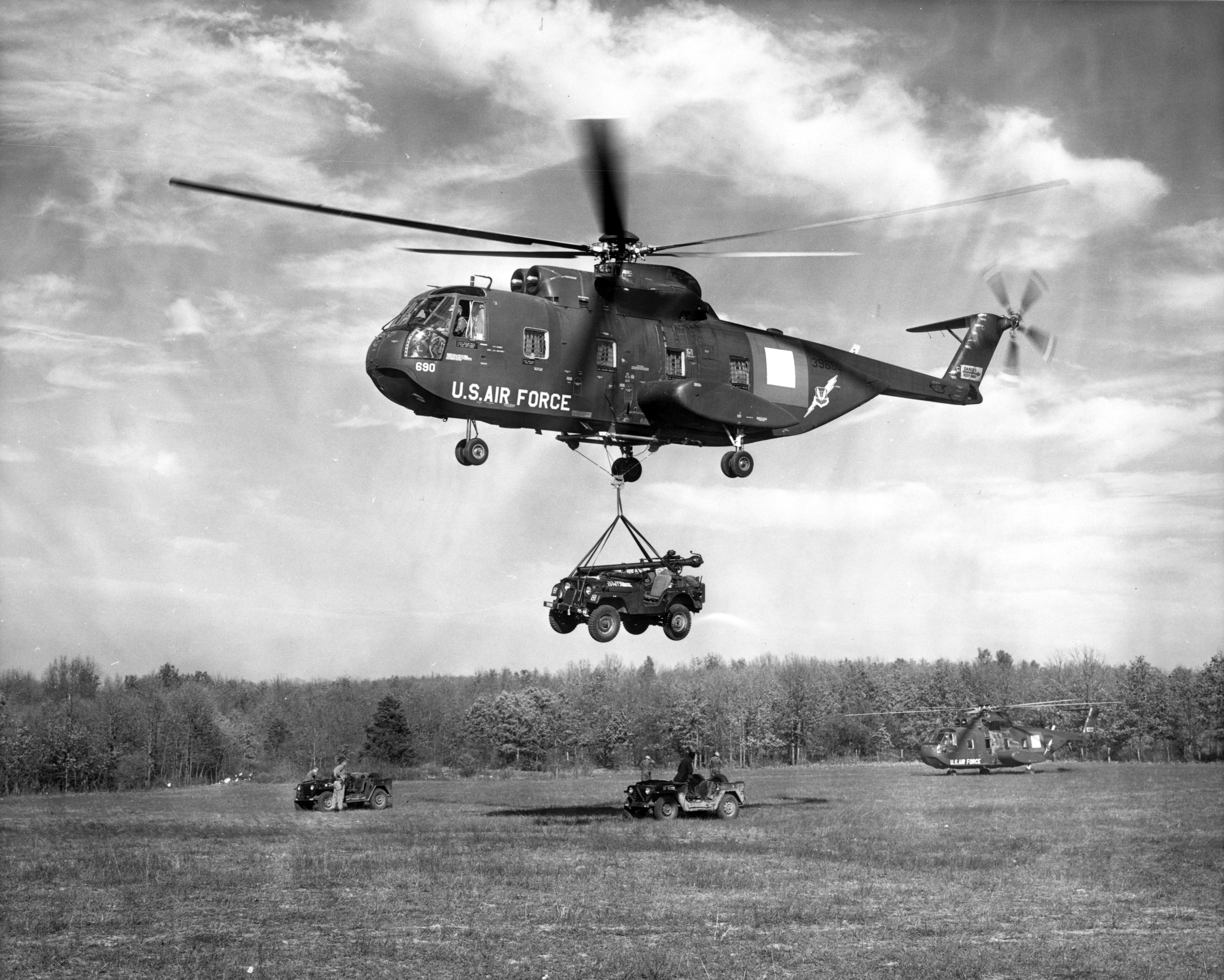
A CH-3C during the 1960s.

USAF variants served in numerous air rescue squadrons and aerospace rescue and recovery squadrons of the Military Airlift Command (MAC), rescue squadrons of the Air Combat Command (ACC) and other USAF major commands worldwide. The aircraft was also used by a number of Air Force Reserve Command and Air National Guard rescue squadrons. All USAF HH-3Es, to include Air Force Reserve and Air National Guard, were retired in the 1990s and replaced by the current HH-60G Pavehawk.

The HH-3F Pelican was a dependable workhorse for the US Coast Guard from the late 1960s until it was phased out in the late 1990s. All USCG HH-3Fs were replaced by the HH-60J Jayhawk and those aircraft have since been upgraded to the MH-60T Jayhawk version.

==== Transatlantic flight ====
Between 31 May and 1 June 1967, two HH-3Es of the United States Air Force made the first nonstop flight across the Atlantic Ocean by helicopter. Departing from New York in the early hours, the two helicopters arrived at the 1967 Paris Air Show at Le Bourget after a 30 hr 46 min flight. The operation needed nine in-flight refuelings. Both helicopters were later lost in combat operations in Southeast Asia in 1969 and 1970.

=== Italy ===
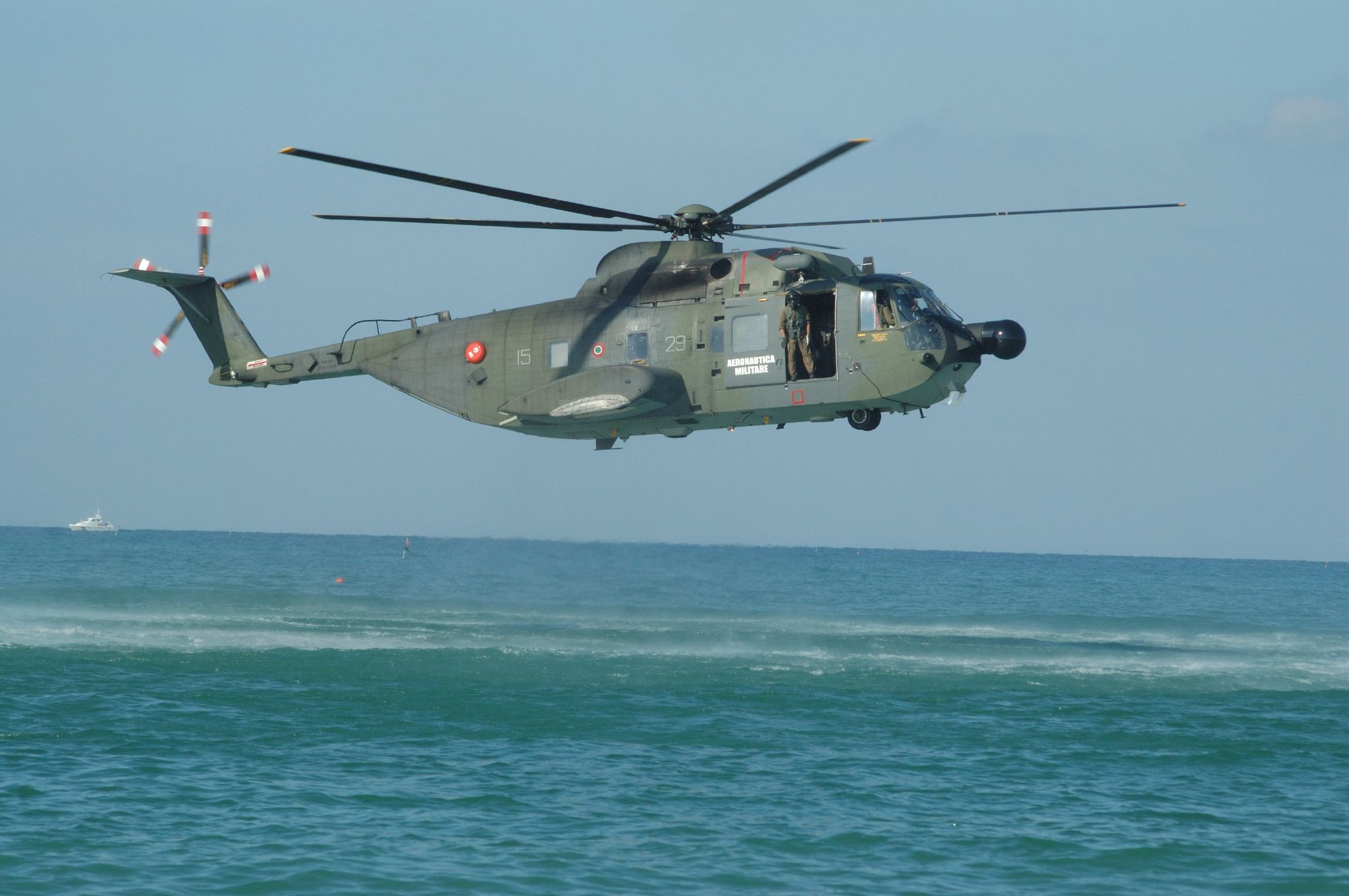
HH-3F of the Italian Air Force

Agusta began production in 1974 and delivered 22 helicopters as replacements for the Grumman HU-16 Albatross used for SAR (Search and Rescue) missions at sea. Italian Air Force AS-61R helicopters performed SAR missions under designation HH-3F in time of peace and C/SAR (Combat SAR) in time of crisis or during military assignment. All helicopters were operated by the five flights of the 15° Stormo Stefano Cagna and deployed in four bases across Italy.

In Italian Service the HH-3F replaced HU-16 seaplanes.

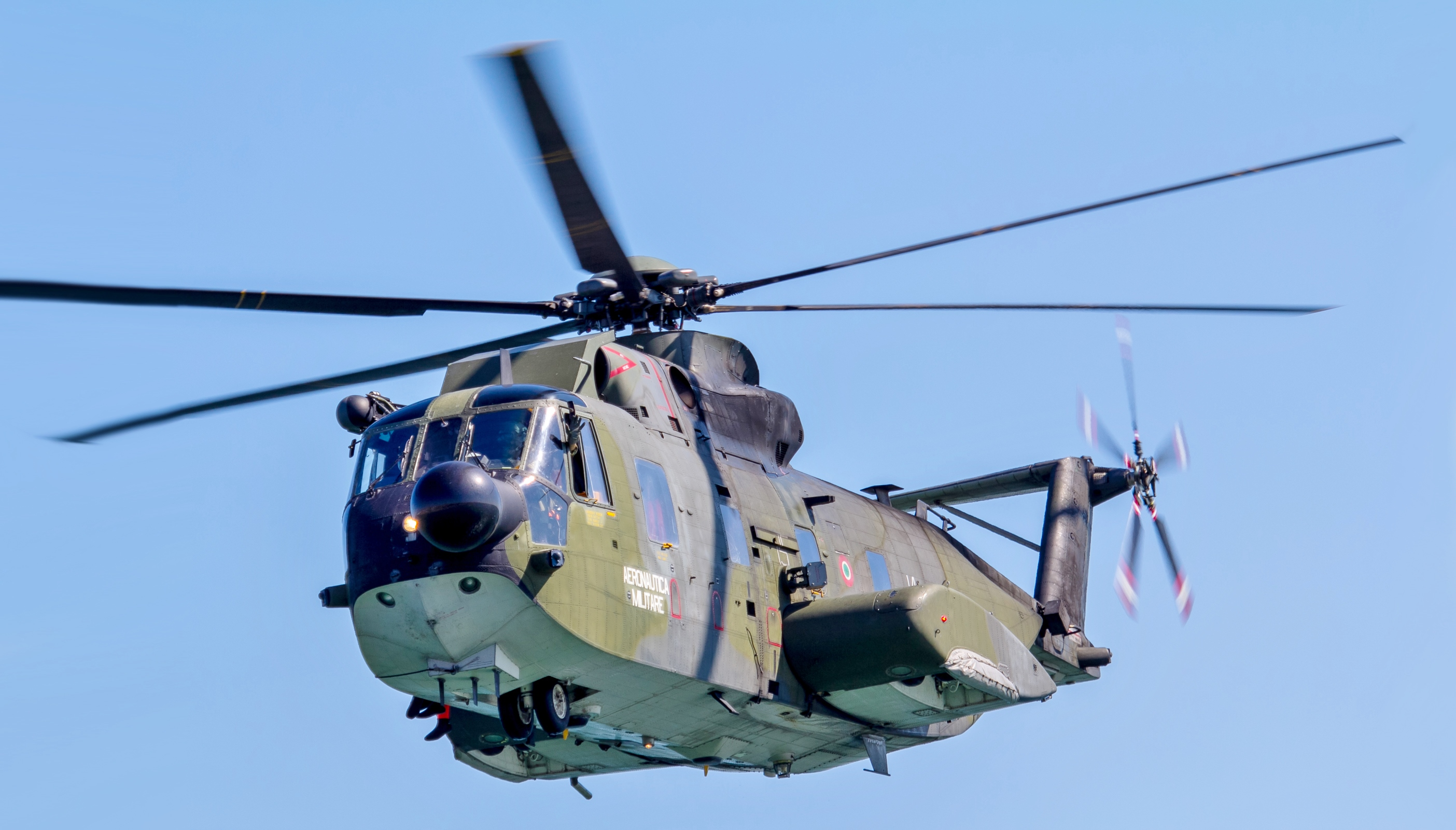
An Italian S-6R, 2014

From 1993 15° Stormo performed support missions to evacuate civilians during natural catastrophes and disasters in Italy. 15º Stormo was also engaged with SAR missions in the hostile zones of the several operations abroad where Italian Armed Forces were deployed - Somalia, Albania, Bosnia, Kosovo, Iraq and Afghanistan.

The Italian Air Force phased out the HH-3F on 26 September 2014, replacing them with the AgustaWestland AW139 in the SAR role.

In November 2024, Clayton International purchased 26 retired Italian S-61R helicopters.

=== Commercial service ===
In 2016 a S-61R crashed in Palm Bay Florida, about 15 minutes after taking off.

== Variants ==
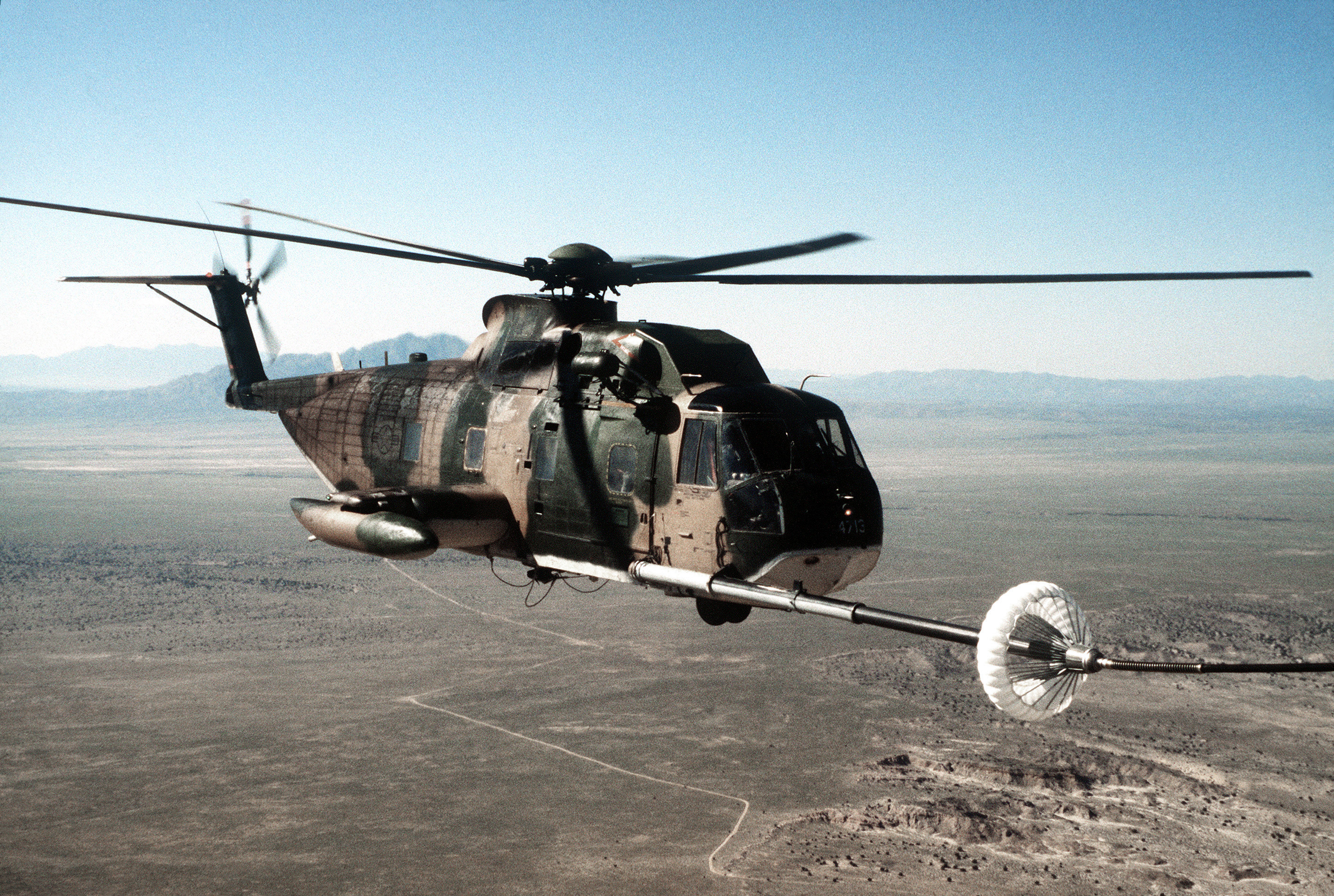
HH-3E refuels in 1980

S-61R
Military transport helicopter, Sikorsky model number.
HR3S-1
Proposed transport helicopter for U.S. Marine Corps, cancelled
S-61R-10
Prototype operated by Sikorsky and first flown 17 June 1963.
S-61R-12

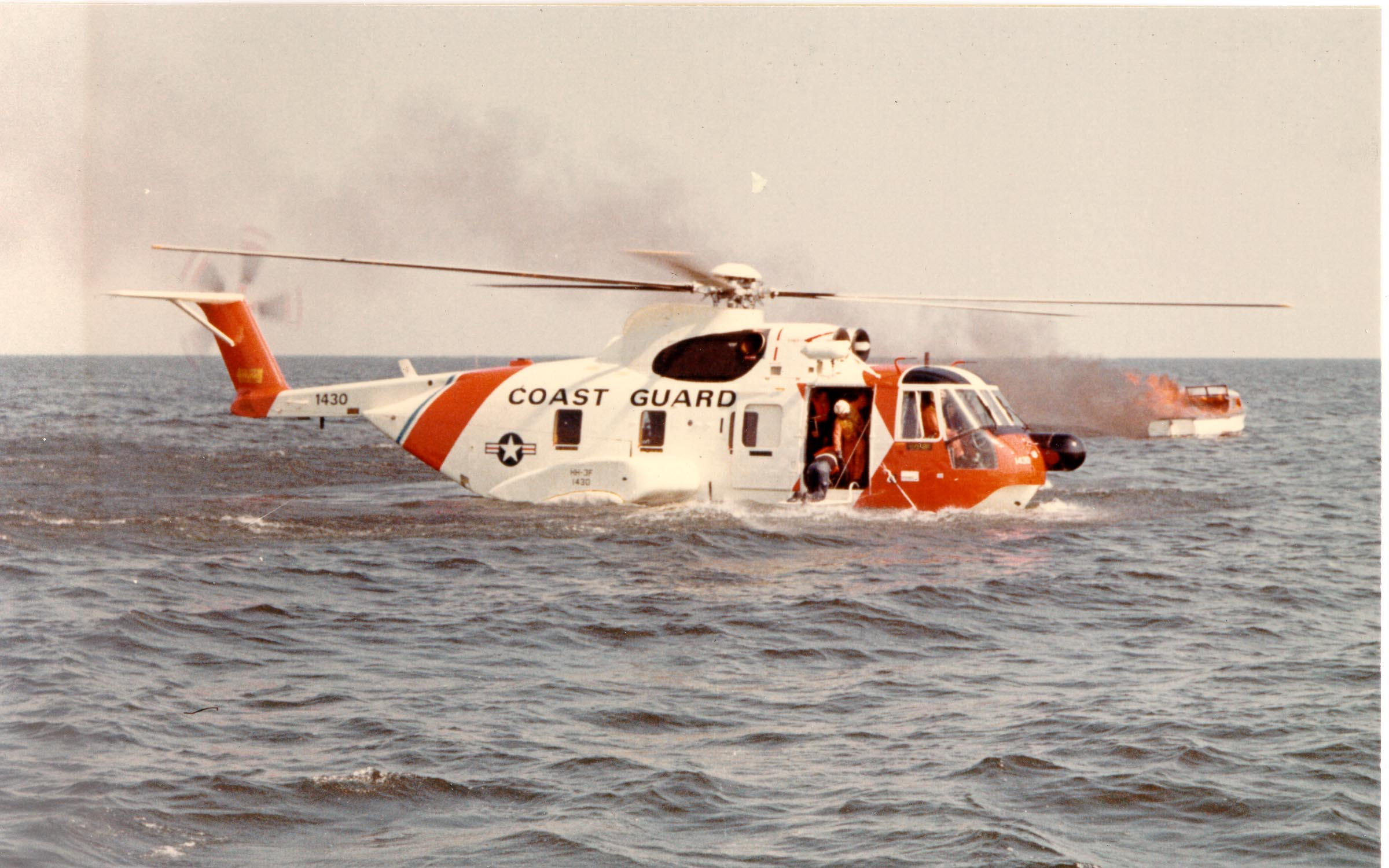
USCG HH-3F Pelican on the water, demonstrating its amphibious capability. This was also the first HH-3F delivered to the Coast Guard.

One aircraft for the Argentine Air Force to HH-3F standards.
CH-3C
Initial military transport helicopter for the US Air Force, powered by two 1050 shp GE T58-GE-1 engines. 44 built; six additional airframes, ordered as CH-3C's were completed on the production line to HH-3E standards (see below).
JCH-3C
Five CH-3C's temporarily assigned to development and test duties; one of them was re-engined as a JCH-3E.
HH-3C
Initial designation of the initial six rescue-configured CH-3C's. They were redesignated HH-3E on 01.03.1966.
CH-3E
Definitive military transport helicopter for the US Air Force, powered by two 1500 shp GE T58-GE-5 engines. 32 were built and another 33 converted from surviving CH-3C's. Another three HH-3E's assigned to Alaskan Air Command were temporarily converted to CH-3E standards.
JCH-3E
One JCH-3C upgraded with T58-GE-5 engines; temporarily assigned to development and test duties.
HH-3E Jolly Green Giant
Long-range, air refuellable search and rescue helicopter for the US Air Force, powered by T58-GE-5 engines. 57 were built as such, of which the initial six were diverted from CH-3C production. Another twelve were converted from CH-3E standards
JHH-3E
One HH-3E temporarily assigned to development and test duties.
MH-3E
Unofficial designation of the HH-3E's assigned to the USAF Reserve 71st Special Operations Squadron at Davis-Monthan AFB.
VH-3E
Unofficial designation of the CH-3E's assigned to the USAF Headquarters Command 1st Helicopter Squadron at Andrews AFB for VIP transport duties.
HH-3F "Pelican"
Long-range search and rescue helicopter for the US Coast Guard, 40 built. Another 35 were built under license in two batches (20+15) by Agusta SpA for the Italian Air Force.

== Operators ==
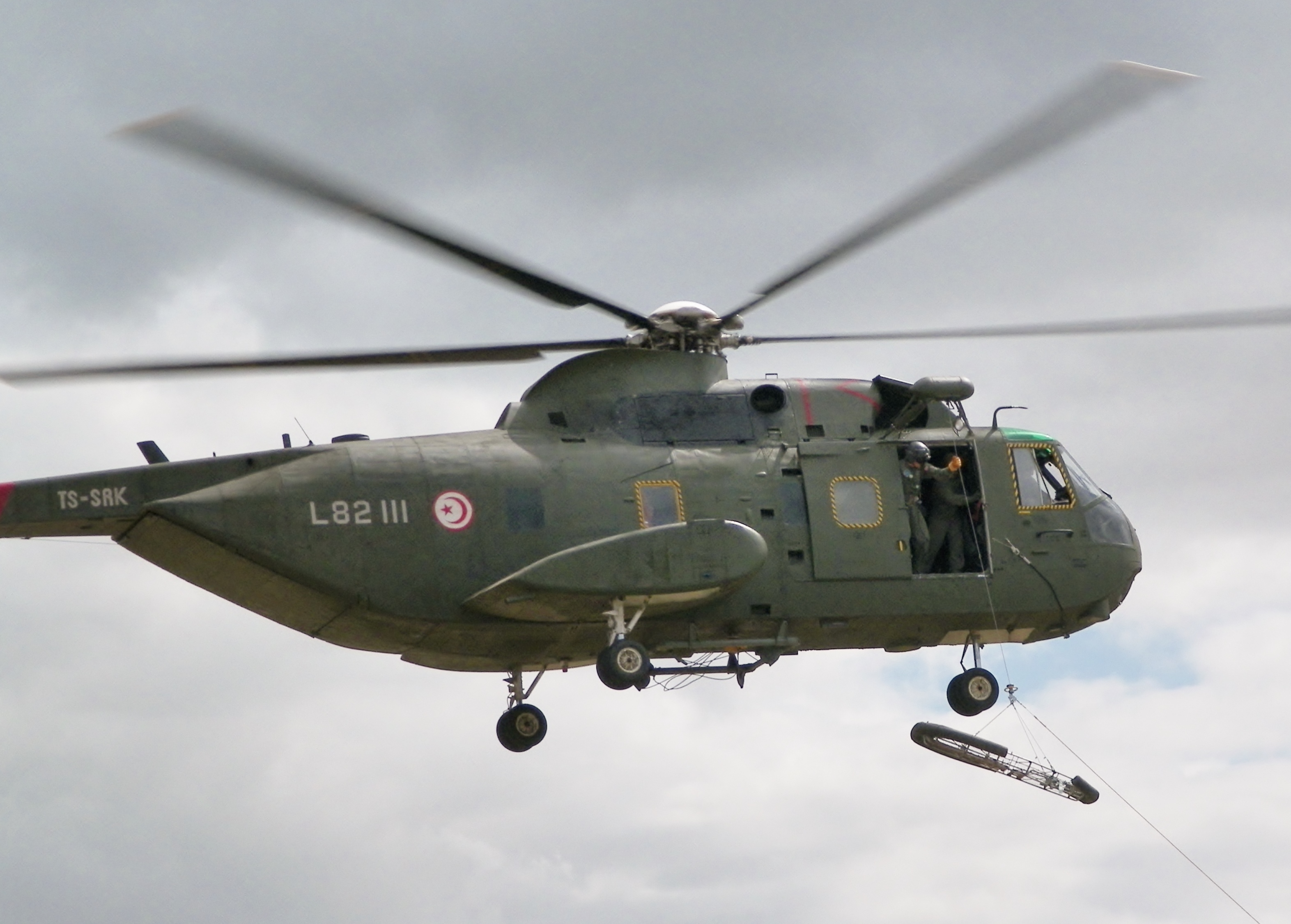
Tunisian HH-3 in 2012 on training exercise

=== Civil ===
United States

- Croman Helicopters
- Erickson

=== Military ===
Tunisia

- Tunisian Air Force

=== Former ===
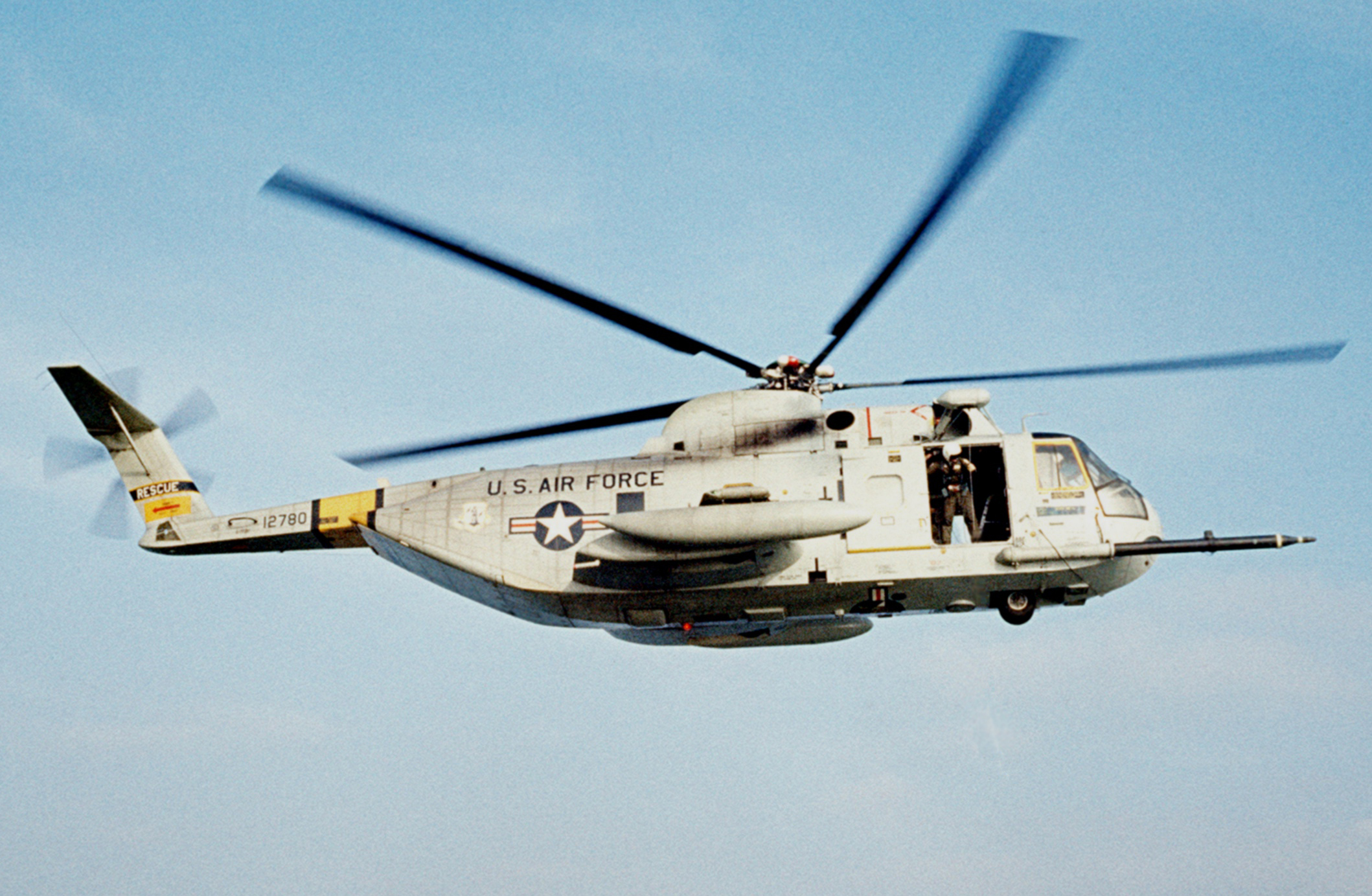
A HH-3E from the 129th ARRG over California

Argentina

- Argentine Air Force

Italy

- Italian Air Force

United States

- San Bernardino County Sheriff
- United States Air Force
- United States Coast Guard

== Aircraft on display ==
=== Argentina ===
- H-02 – S-61R on static display at the Museo Nacional de Aeronáutica in Morón, Buenos Aires. It was formerly used as a presidential helicopter.

=== United States ===
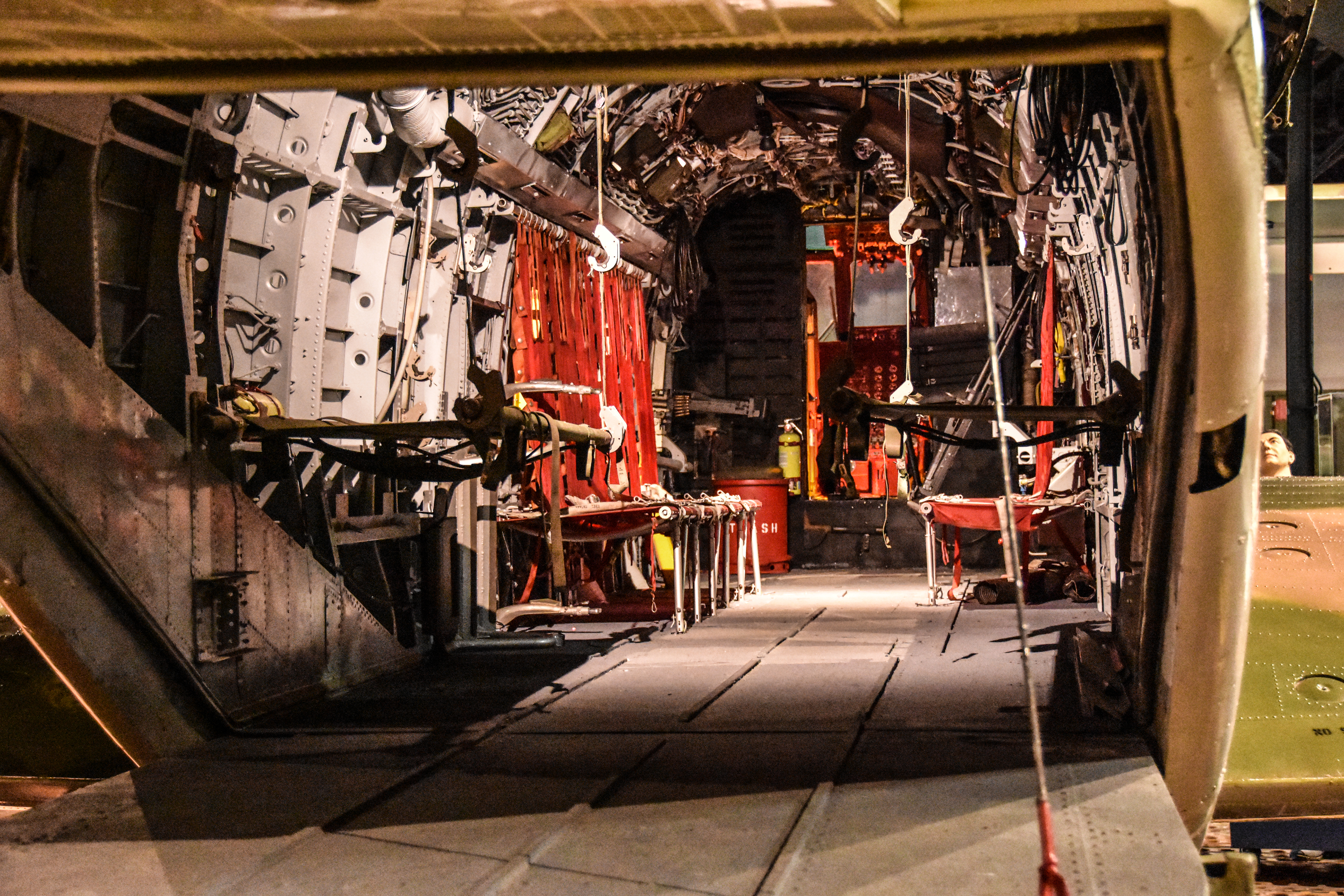
Interior of a HH-3E Jolly Green Giant in a museum

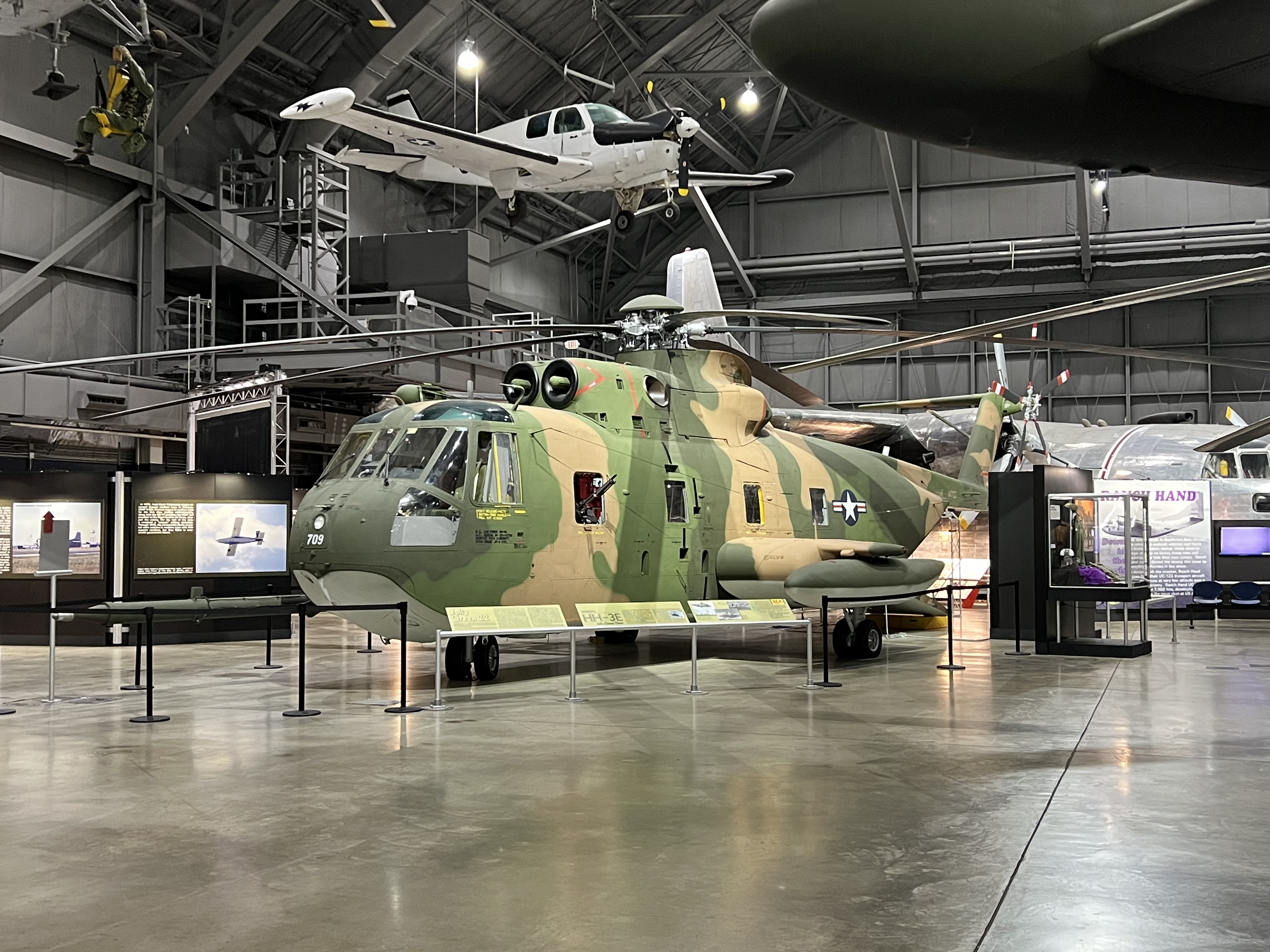
HH-3E Jolly Green Giant at the National Museum of the United States Air Force

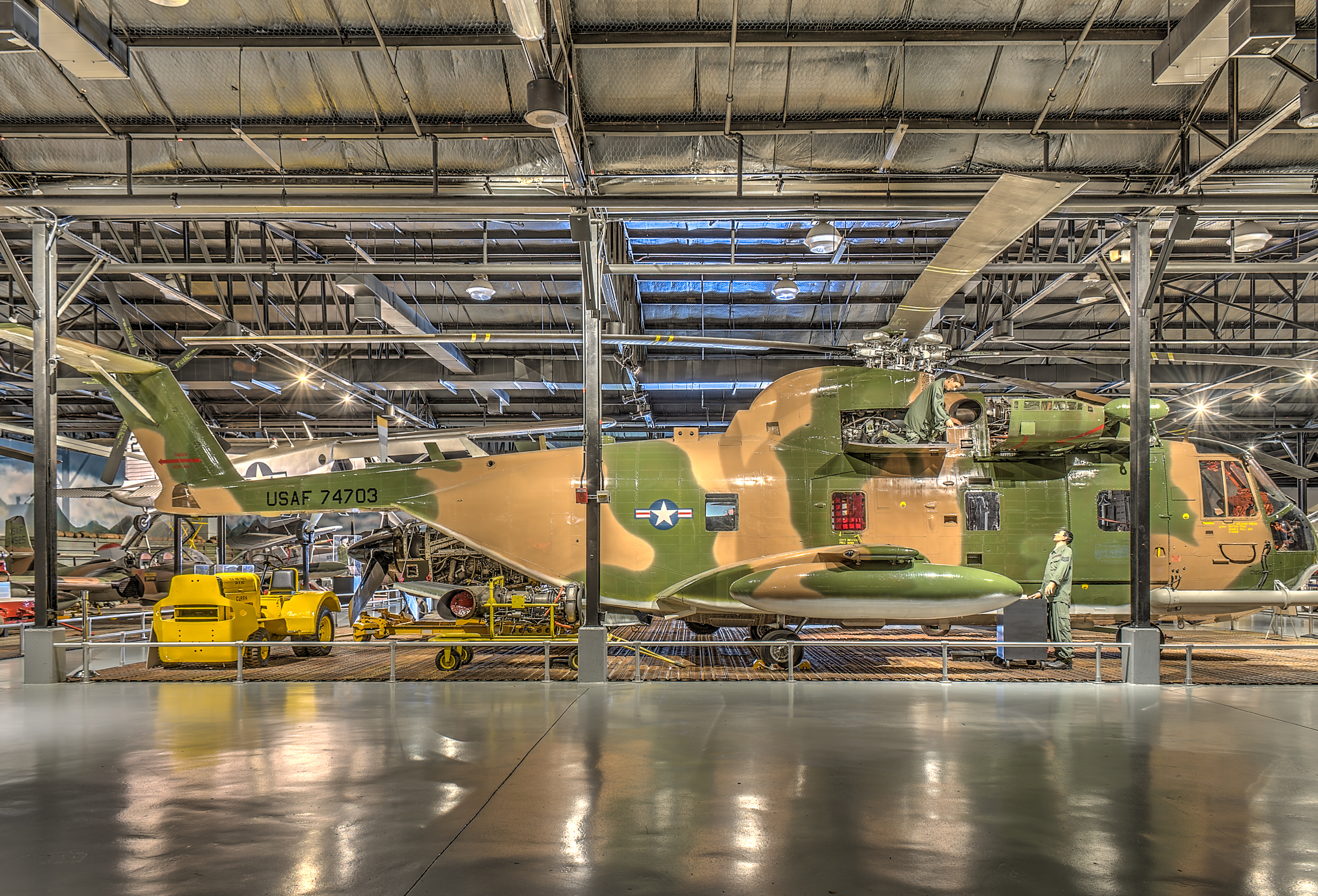
HH-3E at the Museum of Aviation

- 44010 – CH-3C in storage at Yanks Air Museum in Chino, California.
- 62-12581 – CH-3C on static display at the Air Force Flight Test Center Museum at Edwards Air Force Base near Rosamond, California.
- 63-9676 – CH-3E in storage at the National Museum of the United States Air Force at Wright-Patterson Air Force Base in Dayton, Ohio.
- 64-14230 - HH-3E on static display at the United States Air Force Academy at Colorado Springs, Colorado.
- 65-5690 – CH-3E on static display at the Aerospace Museum of California at Sacramento McClellan Airport (former McClellan AFB) in Sacramento, California.
- 64-14232 – H-3E on static display at Kirtland Air Force Base in Albuquerque, New Mexico.
- 65-12784 – HH-3E on static display at the Air Park at Hurlburt Field in Mary Esther, Florida.
- 65-12797 – CH-3E on static display at the Carolinas Aviation Museum in Charlotte, North Carolina.
- 66-13290 – HH-3E on static display at Francis S. Gabreski Air National Guard Base in Westhampton, New York. It is the aircraft in which Leland T. Kennedy earned the first of his two Air Force Crosses.
- 67-14703 – HH-3E on static display at the Museum of Aviation at Robins Air Force Base in Warner Robins, Georgia.
- 67-14709 – HH-3E on static display at the National Museum of the United States Air Force at Wright-Patterson Air Force Base in Dayton, Ohio.
- USCG 1476 – HH-3F on static display at the Pima Air and Space Museum adjacent to Davis-Monthan Air Force Base in Tucson, Arizona.
- USCG 1484 – HH-3F on static display at Winvian Farm in Morris, Connecticut. It is incorporated into a guest bedroom.
- USCG 1486 – HH-3F on static display at the National Naval Aviation Museum at Naval Air Station Pensacola in Pensacola, Florida.

== Specifications (HH-3E) ==
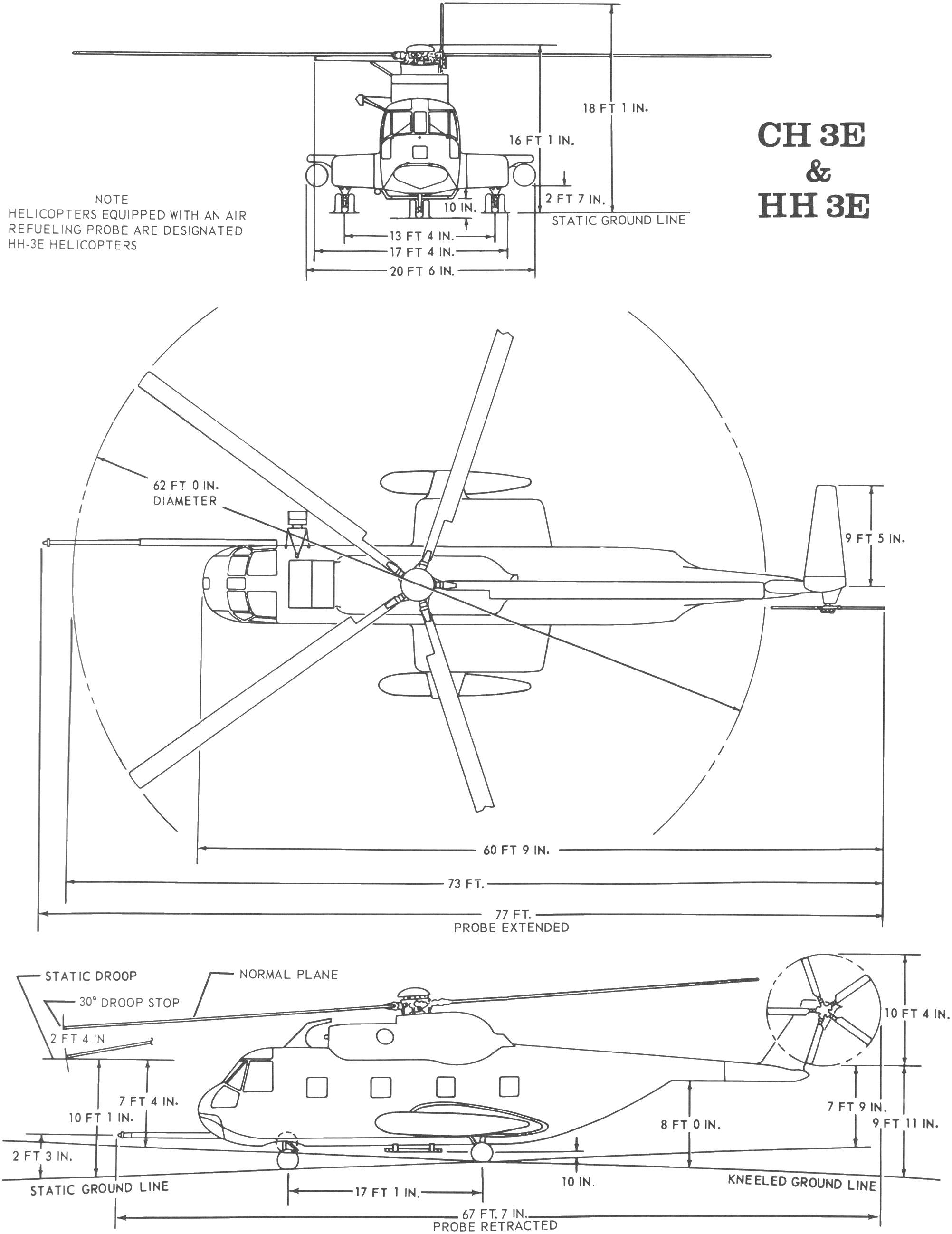
3-view drawing of the Sikorsky CH-3E

Data from Evergreen, Globalsecurity

General characteristics

- Crew: 3
- Capacity: 28 pax / 6,500 lb (2,948 kg) payload
- Length: 73 ft (22 m)
- Height: 18 ft 1 in (5.51 m)
- Empty weight: 13,341 lb (6,051 kg)
- Max takeoff weight: 22,050 lb (10,002 kg)
- Fuel capacity: 683 US gal (569 imp gal; 2,590 L)
- Powerplant: 2 × General Electric T58-GE-10 turboshaft engines, 1,400 shp (1,000 kW) each
- Main rotor diameter: 62 ft (19 m)
- Main rotor area: 3,019 sq ft (280.5 m^{2}) 5-bladed main rotor; blade section NACA 0012

Performance

- Maximum speed: 143 kn (165 mph, 265 km/h)
- Range: 779 nmi (896 mi, 1,443 km)
- Service ceiling: 21,000 ft (6,400 m) IGE

17,500 ft (5,334 m) OGE

- Rate of climb: 2,220 ft/min (11.3 m/s) IGE

1,300 ft/min (396 m/min) OGE

- Disk loading: 7.3 lb/sq ft (36 kg/m^{2})

Armament

- Guns: Door guns on some variants (For information on American equipment, see U.S. Helicopter Armament Subsystems, S-61R)

== See also ==
- HH-60W Jolly Green II
- Coast Guard Air Station Cape Cod § Crash of Helo CG-1432

Related development

- SH-3 Sea King
- Sikorsky HH-52 Seaguard
- CH-53 Sea Stallion
- HH-53 "Super Jolly Green Giant"/MH-53 Pave Low
