= Winthrop H. Smith =

American businessman and investment banker

- Born: 1893; South Hadley, Massachusetts
- Died: January 10, 1961 (aged 67–68); Litchfield, Connecticut
- Other name: Win
- Education: Amherst College (1916); Phillips Academy (1912)
- Occupation: Brokerage
- Employer: Merrill Lynch, Pierce, Fenner & Smith

Winthrop Hiram "Win" Smith (June 30, 1893 – January 10, 1961) was an American businessman and investment banker. He was notable as a name partner of Merrill Lynch, Pierce, Fenner & Smith.

== Biography ==
He was born on June 30, 1893, in South Hadley, Massachusetts, then educated at Phillips Academy. He graduated from Amherst College in 1916.

Upon graduation from Amherst, Smith joined Merrill Lynch in 1916, just two years after the firm's predecessor Charles E. Merrill & Co. was founded. Smith, who began as a junior runner and clerk at Merrill, was groomed by founder and Amherst alumnus Charles E. Merrill.

Smith's career would span more than four decades, and he would ultimately serve as directing partner of the firm. In 1940 and 1941, Smith was an architect of Merill's transformative mergers including E.A. Pierce & Co. and Cassatt & Co. in 1940, followed by the acquisition of Fenner & Beane in 1941. Smith is often credited, along with the innovative advertising manager he had hired, Louis Engel, Jr. (1909 - 1982), for helping to realize Charles E. Merrill's aim of bringing Wall Street to Main Street, and received both respect and affection from his colleagues in the industry and at his firm.

In 1958, Smith handed over day-to-day control of the firm, at the time known as Merrill Lynch, Pierce, Fenner & Beane. In recognition of his role in building Merrill into a leading national brokerage, Smith's name was added to that of the firm becoming Merrill Lynch, Pierce, Fenner & Smith. Smith's name replaced that of Alpheus Beane, whose firm Fenner & Beane had merged with Merrill in 1941.

He died on January 10, 1961, in Litchfield, Connecticut.

== Personal life ==
Smith was married twice. He and his first wife, Gertrude Ingram Behana, had one son, Bardwell L. Smith (1925‐2022). He was a respected professor of religion and Dean of the College at Carleton College in Northfield, Minnesota. His second wife, Vivian G. Brown, was a fashion model for the Powers Agency. She had one son by a former marriage, Gordon F. Linke, who was a branch manager at Merrill Lynch, and together they had one son, Winthrop H. Smith Jr., a former Merrill Lynch executive and the author of Catching Lightning in a Bottle: How Merrill Lynch Revolutionized the Financial World.

In 1948, Smith and his wife purchased a 113-acre farm property in Litchfield, Connecticut, naming it Winvian, after their combined names. Their son, Win Smith Jr., inherited the property and, with his wife, Maggie, later expanded it into a boutique hotel of which Maggie became full owner, operating the property with her daughter, Heather S. Winkelmann, Smith's granddaughter.
