= New Orleans School of Medicine =

Defunct 19th-century medical school in Louisiana, United States

- Type: Private
- Active: 1856–1870
- Location: New Orleans, Louisiana, United States

The New Orleans School of Medicine was a mid-19th-century private medical college based in New Orleans, Louisiana. Founded in 1856, the school closed temporarily in 1862 due to the American Civil War, after which it reopened until 1870. It served as a progressive rival to the Medical Department of the University of Louisiana and was regarded as one of the most innovative institutions in the antebellum United States, particularly for its pioneering use of clinical clerkships at Charity Hospital.

== History ==
The school was formally established on November 1, 1856, largely through the efforts of Dr. Erasmus Darwin Fenner, who served both as professor and dean. At its height, it had about two dozen faculty members. Its founding coincided with a surge of interest in reforming medical education in the South, and it quickly established itself as part of the "Young Medicine" movement, which emphasized modern, student-centered approaches to learning. This philosophy was articulated in its affiliated publication, The New Orleans Medical News and Hospital Gazette, which contrasted the school's progressive values with what it described as the "conservative attitude" of its rival, the University of Louisiana.

After the execution of abolitionist John Brown, one of the professors, Dr. W. C. Hicks, offered, in a letter to Governor Henry A. Wise, to pay Virginia $500 (equivalent to $17,917 in 2025) for Brown's remains, to be used for dissection by medical students. He also pledged that once the skeleton was "properly dried and arranged", he would exhibit it throughout New England, not for money, but to "frighten every Scoundrel Abolitionist out of the country".

The school distinguished itself nationally by initially instituting what historian Robert G. Slawson described as one of the earliest examples of a true clinical clerkship in American medical education. In contrast to the limited clinical exposure common to most U.S. medical schools of the time, New Orleans School of Medicine students were required to engage directly in patient care by examining, diagnosing, and presenting patients to attending physicians, as well as proposing treatments and following the cases through to discharge. This was conducted at Charity Hospital, and though highly unusual for the period, it prefigured the clerkship model later adopted by American medical schools in the late 19th century. By 1861, the school had been deemed the seventh-ranked medical school in the country. At the outset of the Civil War, "[t]he faculty of the New Orleans School of Medicine agreed to accept any seceding students on payment only of a five-dollar matriculation fee and the customary twenty-five-dollar graduation fee".

The school closed due to the war in 1862, and was reopened by Fenner's efforts in 1866, just before his sudden death on May 4, 1866, thereafter remaining open until 1870. Though short-lived, the institution's early adoption of clinical clerkships prefigured reforms that would become widespread decades later, and the competition it fostered with the University of Louisiana helped lay the groundwork for the growth of Tulane University School of Medicine and the institutionalization of clinical education in the South.
