= Bennet Dowler =

American physician (1797–1879)

Bennet Dowler (1797-1879) was a medical doctor and physiologist of the United States.

== Biography ==
Dowler was born in Moundsville, Virginia, and received an M.D. from the medical school of the University of Maryland. He settled in Clarksburg, Virginia, where he was postmaster for four years.

In 1836, he settled in New Orleans, where he founded the Academy of Sciences, and for some years edited The New Orleans Medical and Surgical Journal. His many experiments upon the condition of the human body immediately after death resulted in valuable discoveries in contractibility, calorification, and capillary circulation.

His researches on animal heat, in health, in disease, and after death, which have been published in various medical journals, disclosed the fact that post-mortem calorification after death from fever, cholera, sunstroke, etc., rises in some cases much higher than its antecedent maximum during the progress of the trouble.

In 1845 Dowler began a series of experiments in comparative physiology on the alligator of Louisiana, which led him to conclude that, after decapitation, the head and, especially, the trunk afford evidences of possessing the faculties of sensation and motion for hours, and that the headless trunk, deprived of all the senses but that of feeling, still retains the powers of perception and volition, and may act with intelligence in avoiding an irritant. As the result of those discoveries, he held that the functions and structure of the nervous system constitute a unity inconsistent with the assumption of four distinct and separate sets of nerves, and a corresponding four-fold set of functions.

In 1860, Dowler is recorded as having enslaved three people: two females, aged 10 and 35, and a male aged 27.

He was a fellow and founder of the Royal Society of Northern Antiquities, Copenhagen, a permanent member of the American Medical Association, and was one of the founders of the New Orleans Academy of Sciences.

== Selected works ==
Dowler wrote articles and treatises on a variety of topics, some controversial. Several of his works have been digitized by the National Library of Medicine:

Contributions to experimental physiology: showing that the ligation of the trachea, the divisions of the spinal cord in the cervical and dorsal regions, the removal of the viscera ... do not prevent intelligence, sensation, and motions (1852)

Experimental rescearches [sic] on the post-mortem contractility of the muscles, with observations on the reflex theory (1846)

A response to a professor and a speculation on the sensorium (1850)

Researches on the natural history of death (1850)

Tableau of the yellow fever of 1853: with topographical, chronological, and historical sketches of the epidemics of New Orleans since their origin in 1796, illustrative of the quarantine question (1854)
