= The New Orleans Medical and Surgical Journal =

The New Orleans Medical and Surgical Journal was a bimonthly medical journal published between 1844 and 1952, and the predecessor of the contemporary Journal of the Louisiana State Medical Society. It published Samuel Cartwright's pseudoscientific theories of race and disease, including the first treatment of the conjectural disease drapetomania. The journal was involved in debates on neuroscience and circulation in the 19th century.

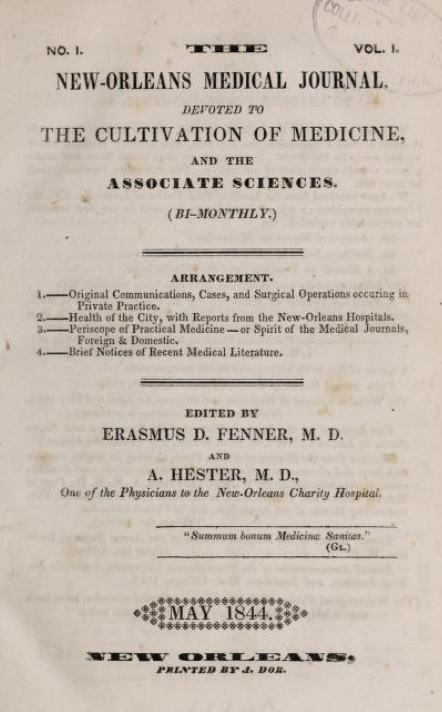
The cover page of the first publication of the New Orleans Medical and Surgical Journal.

== Background ==
The treatment of slaves constituted a considerable portion of medical work in the South as plantations sought to protect their expenditures, leading Southern physicians to offer discounted rates for the treatment of slaves.

Physicians of the Antebellum South widely argued that racial disparities between Africans and Caucasians required medical treatments unique to African-Americans. This belief may have originated in the lack of protein and essential nutrients in slaves' diets, their lack of adequate clothing, and exposure to the elements incurred in field work. Africans also possessed partial immunity to yellow fever, smallpox, and malaria while being more vulnerable to pneumonia and respiratory illnesses. Yaws also manifested in slaves as a tropical disease, yet never became significant to Southern medical practice. Regardless, the uniqueness of the disease may have contributed to a perceived sense of disparity. Samuel Cartwright argued that these disparities were great enough that treatments given to Caucasians might kill or maim African-Americans. While moderate Southerners remained skeptical of extreme constructions of disease and race, most generally believed in the need for the specialized treatment of African slaves.

Physicians similarly argued that differing climates between the Northern and Southern United States required specialized knowledge of climate and disease, especially given that yellow fever was the most prevalent epidemic of the South, yet nearly nonexistent in the North. Similarly, malaria severely threatened Southern communities, yet had only been observed in New England prior to the American Revolution, while typhus became especially prevalent in Northern immigrant communities despite being eradicated in the South. Consequently, southerners tended to believe in the superiority of Southern medical institutions in educating Southern physicians. This sentiment led Southerners studying in Northern medical schools to collectively withdraw to attend Southern institutions, which occasionally offered reduced fees to the returning students. Two such actions occurred in 1859-60 from University of Pennsylvania and Jefferson College. However, the return was not unanimously popular with Southern professors, many of whom had been educated in the North, yet many Southerners welcomed the transition as an economic advantage and improvement in medical care.

== History ==
The journal began publication in May 1844 under the editorship of Erasmus Darwin Fenner and A. Hester, with an introductory address on yellow fever by J. F. Beugnot. The first manuscript also reproduced a report on dislocations read by Samuel Cartwright before the Natchez Medical Society.

During the 1853 New Orleans yellow fever outbreak, Louisiana-based medical publications were reluctant to acknowledge the presence of the disease, fearing the repercussions of a quarantine on trade.

In 1854, physiologist Bennet Dowler assumed a position as editor of the journal after having been chairman of the Committee on Medical Science of the American Medical Association. Dowler reserved substantial portions of the journal for his own work, leading to an unpopular reputation among the journal's community. During this period, Dowler's work concerned post-mortem and statistical studies of human corpses. Dowler, who found New Orleans’ population receptive of his experimentation, utilized cholera and yellow fever epidemics to supply the necessary cadavers. Dowler extensively studied circulation in these investigations to support his position that animal heat did not result from respiration, contrary to the position of most physicians at the time. Dowler also violated the consensus of the medical community by advocating his own theory of “diffused sensorium” that opposed centralized models of the nervous system developed by Charles Bell and Marshall Hall. Dowler advanced interest in his work by demonstrating vivisections on alligators and other vertebrates in his private residence.
