= Winthrop H. Smith Jr. =

Winthrop Hiram Smith Jr.
- Born: 1949 (age 76–77); Litchfield, Connecticut
- Other name: Win
- Education: Wharton School (MBA, 1974); Amherst College (BA, 1971); Deerfield Academy (1967)
- Occupations: Investment banking, Venture capital
- Employer(s): Summit Ventures (owner of Sugarbush Resort); Merrill Lynch (prior)

Winthrop Hiram "Win" Smith Jr. (born 1949 in New York, New York) is the former executive vice president of Merrill Lynch & Co. and Chairman of Merrill Lynch International, Inc. He spent 27 years at Merrill Lynch, beginning in 1974, after receiving an MBA from Wharton, retiring in January 2002. He is a 1971 graduate of Amherst College. He began as an investment banking associate and, for the last ten years of his career, was responsible for Merrill Lynch's growth outside of the United States.

== Biography ==
He was born in 1949 in New York, New York to Winthrop H. Smith and Vivian G. Brown.

He married Margaret "Maggie" Dunn Smith, daughter of Webster Bank founder Harold Webster Smith on August 7, 1971. Their families were not related.

Smith is now an entrepreneur, private investor, and chairman and CEO of Summit Ventures NE, LLC, which owned and operated Sugarbush Resort in Warren, Vermont from October 2001 until it was sold to Colorado-based Alterra Mountain Company in January 2020. Smith is credited with restoring Sugarbush to the status it originally had when founded by Damon and Sara Gadd in 1958. He also served as a director of Eaton Vance Corporation until it was acquired by Morgan Stanley in March 2021 and serves on the Board of The Nature Conservancy Vermont which he chaired from 2020-2023. He chaired The National Ski Areas Association and was also a member of the Board of the Vermont Ski Areas Association. Previously, he served on the Boards of AGF Management in Canada where he was the Lead Independent Director, the Richardson Financial Group, and Richardson-GMP in Canada. He was also Chairman of The Vermont Business Roundtable and the Lake Champlain Regional Chamber of Commerce. He is also an Honorary Commander of the Vermont Air National Guard. The National Ski Areas Association awarded him their Lifetime Achievement Award in 2022. His former philanthropic duties included serving on the Boards of Deerfield Academy, the Cancer Research Institute, The Winthrop H. Smith Memorial Foundation, the New York City Ballet, The Economic Club of New York, Outward Bound USA, The Japan Society, The United Nations Association of the United States and The Americas Society. He was a former member of the Council on Foreign Relations.

Smith authored Catching Lightning in a Bottle: How Merrill Lynch Revolutionized the Financial World, about the history of Merrill Lynch, which became available on December 5, 2013, the fifth anniversary of the final Merrill Lynch shareholder meeting.

He married twice. His first marriage was to Maggie Smith, and they have four children and nine grandchildren. His eldest child, Heather Smith Winkelmann, is managing director of Winvian Farm, in Litchfield, Connecticut. This property was purchased by Smith's parents, Win and Vivian, in 1948, and named Winvian, after their combined names; then later expanded into a boutique hotel by Smith and his former wife, Maggie, who is full owner. He was married to Lili Ruane, the daughter of investment professional William J. Ruane and the sister of Boston music impresario Billy Ruane, both deceased. She has four daughters of her own and four grandchildren. Lili died from pancreatic cancer in February 2024.

His stepfather was Charles B. McVay, the Captain of the Indianapolis. A recent book entitled The Indianapolis: The True Story of the Worst Sea Disaster in the U.S. Naval History and the Fifty-Year Fight to Exonerate an Innocent Man, by Lynn Vincent and Sara Vladic, recounts the tragic story of The Indianapolis and the disgraceful treatment of Captain McVay by the U.S. Navy in 1945.
