= Clarence Norman Fenner =

American geologist

Clarence Norman Fenner (19 July 1870 – 24 December 1949) was an American geologist who specialized in petrology, particularly the transformations of silica minerals. One of his innovations in geology was the use of modified variation diagrams based on those introduced by Alfred Harker which are sometimes referred to as "Fenner-type variation diagrams".

Fenner was born in Paterson, New Jersey where his father, William Griff was the son of a clergyman who had moved from England and had worked at the New York business Field, Chapman, and Fenner. Fenner's mother was Elmina Jane, daughter of country physician Dr Carpenter. Fenner was educated at private schools and travelled to Europe with his tutor McChesney in 1888. He joined the School of Mines at Columbia University, graduating in 1892. He went to work for mining companies in Canada, Mexico and other places before joining Columbia University again for a master's degree (1909) and a doctoral (1910). His PhD was on the paragenesis of zeolites and other minerals in basalt. He then worked as a petrologist at the Carnegie Institution, Washington. His main interest was in petrology, and took a special interest in the silicate minerals using laboratory techniques to examine their transitions under different temperatures. During World War I, the lab was involved in the production of glass for optical instruments and Fenner was put in charge of the Spencer Lens Company. In 1919 he led an expedition to Mt Katmai in Alaska. He also investigated the geology of Yellowstone from 1928 to 1934.
