= Charles Erasmus Fenner =

American judge (1834–1911)

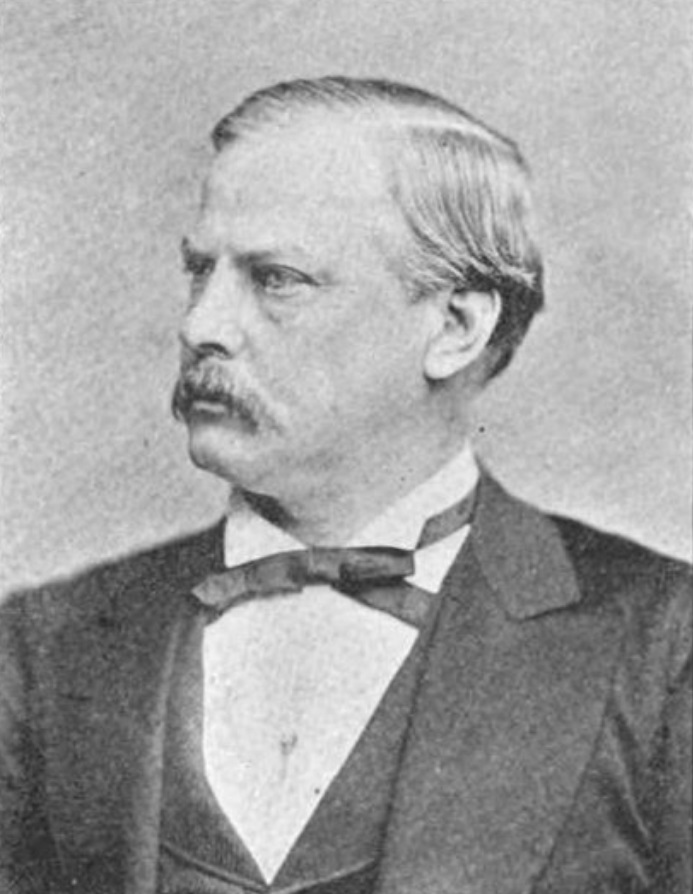
- Justice Charles E. Fenner.

Justice of the Louisiana Supreme Court
- In office April 5, 1880 – September 1, 1893

Personal details
- Born: February 14, 1834 Jackson, Tennessee, U.S.
- Died: October 24, 1911 (aged 77) New Orleans, Louisiana, U.S.
- Spouse: Carrie B. Payne (m. 1866)
- Children: 4, including Charles P. Fenner and Erasmus D. Fenner
- Education: University of Virginia, University of Louisiana (Law)
- Occupation: Lawyer, Judge
- Known for: Plessy v. Ferguson (Louisiana Supreme Court decision)

Military service
- Rank: Captain
- Unit: Fenner's Louisiana Battery
- Battles/wars: Vicksburg Campaign, Atlanta campaign, Battle of Nashville

Charles Erasmus Fenner (February 14, 1834 – October 24, 1911) was a Louisiana lawyer who captained a battery in the American Civil War, and later served as a justice of the Louisiana Supreme Court from April 5, 1880, to September 1, 1893. During his service on the court, he hosted a dying Jefferson Davis in his home, and wrote the infamous decision in Plessy v. Ferguson holding that "separate but equal" accommodations could be provided for whites and non-whites, which was upheld by the United States Supreme Court.

== Early life, education, and military service ==
Born in Jackson, Tennessee, Fenner was the only child of Dr. Erasmus Darwin Fenner, who moved to New Orleans in the early 1840s after the death of his wife in 1841, and soon became an editor of The New Orleans Medical and Surgical Journal. Fenner received instruction from his father, who hoped that Fenner would follow him into the medical profession. Fenner also received a common school education in New Orleans, and then attended the Western Military Institute in Kentucky, graduating as valedictorian at the age of seventeen. He studied at the University of Virginia for two years. He graduated from the Law Department of the University of Louisiana in 1855, and immediately entered into private practice, where "[h]e soon secured a large clientele, especially in the department of mercantile law", until the outbreak of the American Civil War.

Fenner supported John C. Breckinridge and Joseph Lane in the election of 1860, and when Abraham Lincoln was elected and war broke out, Fenner joined in the Confederate States Army. He initially enlisted as a first lieutenant, assisting in forming the military battalion of the Louisiana Guards, and later becoming captain of one of the companies. The battalion's term of service expiring before the conscript law went into effect, and New Orleans having fallen to Union forces, Fenner organized a battery under his name in April 1862, in Jackson, Mississippi. The company, which was called "Fenner's Louisiana Battery", participated in the campaigns of Vicksburg, Atlanta, and Nashville. Fenner "never accepted promotion, preferring to preserve his connection with the organization bearing his name".

== Political and judicial career ==
In 1866 Fenner was elected a member of the first Louisiana State Legislature under the reconstruction policy of Andrew Johnson. This was the only political office he ever held, as he otherwise "declined all solicitations to become a candidate for public office". In 1877, he authored resolutions adopted by the people of New Orleans in a mass meeting following the contested gubernatorial election between Democrat Francis T. Nicholls and Republican Stephen B. Packard, in which both candidates claimed victory, with the resolutions declaring that the people refused to submit to the Packard government. President Rutherford B. Hayes ultimately accepted Nicholls as the winner of the election. Fenner also served as President of the R. E. Lee Monumental Association, for the erection of a monument to Robert E. Lee.

In 1880, Governor Louis A. Wiltz appointed Fenner to the newly reorganized state supreme court for a four-year term, and in 1884, he was also appointed professor of civil law at Tulane University, the position having been vacated by the appointment of predecessor James B. Eustis to the United States Senate, but Fenner was forced to resign from this position when it was discovered that a statute barred him from holding the office while also serving as a member of the Tulane Board of Administration. In 1884 Governor Samuel D. McEnery reappointed him for a twelve-year term. In November 1889, former Confederate States President Jefferson Davis fell ill while visiting Louisiana, and was taken to Fenner's Garden District home. Fenner's father-in-law, J. M. Payne, was an old friend of Davis, who remained bedridden but stable in Fenner's home for two weeks, but took a turn for the worse in early December. According to Fenner, just when Davis again appeared to be improving, he lost consciousness on the evening of December 5 and died at 12:45 a.m. on Friday, December 6, 1889, holding the hand of his wife, Varina, and in the presence of several friends.

In 1892, Fenner wrote the decision of the Supreme Court of Louisiana in the state's portion of the case of Plessy v. Ferguson, holding that "separate but equal" accommodations could be provided for whites and non-whites. In speaking for the court's decision that Ferguson's judgment did not violate the Fourteenth Amendment to the United States Constitution, Fenner cited a number of precedents, including two key cases from Northern states. The Massachusetts Supreme Court had ruled in 1849—before the 14th amendment—that segregated schools were constitutional. In answering the charge that segregation perpetuated racial prejudice, the Massachusetts court famously stated: "This prejudice, if it exists, is not created by law, and probably cannot be changed by law." At the expiration of his second term in 1894, he returned to private practice.

In 1892, Fenner became president of the Tulane Board of Administrators. He was also president of the Boston Club for twelve years, and a member of the Board of Trustees of the Peabody Educational Fund. He was noted as an orator.

== Personal life and death ==
On October 6, 1866, Fenner married Carrie B. Payne of New Orleans, with whom he had three sons and one daughter. His oldest son, Charles P. Fenner, became a professor of law at Tulane Law School. His second son, Erasmus D. Fenner, became a professor of orthopedic surgery at Tulane Medical School.

Fenner died in New Orleans at the age of 78, following a bout of pneumonia.

Political offices
Preceded by Newly reconstituted court.	Justice of the Louisiana Supreme Court; 1880–1893	Succeeded by Charles Parlange
