= David Fenner =

Scottish footballer

Personal information
- Full name: David Hendry Fenner
- Date of birth: 1914
- Place of birth: Scotland
- Date of death: 25 February 1945 (aged 31)
- Place of death: near Eethen, German-occupied Netherlands
- Position: Outside left

Senior career*
Years	Team	Apps	(Gls)
–1938	Kilsyth Rangers		
1938–1939	Airdrieonians	21	(14)
1939–1945	Stenhousemuir	1	(0)
	→ Manchester United (guest)	6	
- * Club domestic league appearances and goals

David Hendry Fenner (1914 – 25 February 1945) was a Scottish footballer who played in the Scottish League for Airdrieonians as an outside left.

== Personal life ==
Fenner was married. He served as a flying officer with No. 98 Squadron RAF during the Second World War. Fenner was killed in the crash of his B-25 Mitchell bomber at Eethen, German-occupied Netherlands on 25 February 1945 and was buried in Jonkerbos War Cemetery.

== Career statistics ==
Appearances and goals by club, season and competition
Club	Season	League			Scottish Cup		Total	
Club	Season	Division	Apps	Goals	Apps	Goals	Apps	Goals
Airdrieonians	1937–38	Scottish Second Division	10	7	—		10	7
Airdrieonians	1938–39	Scottish Second Division	11	7	2	0	13	7
Career total			21	14	2	0	23	7
