= Erasmus Darwin Fenner =

American physician (1807–1866)

Erasmus Darwin Fenner (1807 – May 4, 1866) was an American medical doctor who helped to establish several medical journals, and was one of the founders of the New Orleans School of Medicine. He was the father of judge Charles Erasmus Fenner.

== Early life, education, and career ==
Born in Franklin, North Carolina, the ninth of eleven children of physician Richard Fenner, he pursued his early studies at the academy at Raleigh, North Carolina, under the Rev. Dr. McPheeters. After his father moved to Tennessee, under the guidance of a competent tutor, he acquired an education in the sciences, and in the Greek and Latin languages. He began the study of medicine in 1827, under his elder brother, Dr. Robert Fenner; attended his first course of lectures in 1829, and graduated in 1830 at the University of Transylvania in Kentucky. In 1830, he entered the practice of medicine in Jackson, Tennessee, and in 1832 he married Ann Collier, a young lady from the State of Georgia, who was said to have been possessed of great attraction of person and manners. In 1833, Fenner moved to Clinton, Mississippi, where he soon enjoyed a large practice, and his son Charles was born.

== Career in Louisiana ==
In 1837 Fenner lost much of his income, and his wife died, leaving him to raise his son alone. He moved to New Orleans in the spring of 1840. He came to New Orleans with little money, and with few friends and acquaintances; he lived on the most economical scale, and devoted himself to the education of his son. Dr. D. Warren Brickell, in a biographical sketch of Fenner, wrote:

When we first made Dr. Fenner's acquaintance, in 1848, he was still devoted to the instruction of his son, and his evenings were spent in cultivating his mind. During the first year of his residence here he realized a few hundred dollars from his practice; the next a little more; the next a little more; and so on, until, at the time of our acquaintance with him (the eighth of his residence here), he had a very genteel practice, had purchased a home in the centre of the city, and was working hard to pay for it. Often have we been deeply interested in the tale of his economical life in New Orleans, during at least five years. It was in the midst of this probationary struggle that Dr. Fenner found a kindred spirit in poverty and just aspirations, and the result was the beginning of that more public career which brought him to the favorable notice of our brethren at home and abroad, and fixed for him a reputation both enviable and enduring.

In the spring of 1844, Fenner co-founded the New Orleans Medical Journal, in conjunction with Dr. A. Hester, who had come to this city at the same time as Fenner, and who was also struggling financially. Fenner helped establish several medical journals in New Orleans, and was instrumental in establishing the New Orleans School of Medicine, described by John Harley Warner as home to the "most aggressive body of proselytizers for a plan of education built around a recognition of the South's medical distinctiveness", a phrase used in support of the theory that the blacks and whites were so different as to require different medical approaches. Fenner left no doubt of his position in the matter; echoing Louis Agassiz, he declared: "If this be sectional medicine I cannot help it. It was not made so by me, but by Nature".

Fenner was a prolific medical writer and editor. His work included editorials, reviews, and detailed reports on epidemics, particularly yellow fever outbreaks in New Orleans. Among his notable publications were Southern Medical Reports (1849–1850), which compiled data on medical topography, meteorology, and disease patterns across Southern states, and an 1854 pamphlet on the yellow fever epidemic of 1853. He was also involved in early efforts that led to the formation of the American Medical Association, attending one of its initial meetings in 1846 as a representative of Southern medical societies.

== Founding of the New Orleans School of Medicine ==
In 1856, Fenner helped establish the New Orleans School of Medicine. He served as professor of principles and practice of medicine and as dean of the faculty.

The institution was located near the Charity Hospital of New Orleans, whose wards were opened for clinical instruction. The school quickly expanded, enrolling 76 students in its first session and growing to more than 200 students within five years. Through legislative support and private funding, the school developed facilities, including a medical museum, and became a major center for medical education in the South. Fenner remained deeply involved in teaching and continued contributing to medical journals, including the New Orleans Medical News and Hospital Gazette, during this period.

== Civil War and later years ==
Fenner opposed secession at its outset, viewing it as a grave national crisis. However, after Louisiana voted to secede, he aligned himself with his state in accordance with prevailing views of state allegiance.

During the American Civil War, Fenner helped organize medical services, including the establishment of a Louisiana hospital in Richmond, Virginia, and later served in Mobile, Alabama, where he cared for wounded soldiers in hospital wards assigned to him. In 1863, he was expelled from New Orleans after refusing to take an oath of allegiance to the United States. He subsequently worked within Confederate lines until the end of the war.

The strain of wartime service and the broader conditions of the conflict adversely affected his health, and he developed diabetes. After a period of recovery in Mississippi, he returned to New Orleans to find his property disrupted and the medical school under occupation. He succeeded in reopening the school and resumed his professional activities despite declining health. On May 4, 1866, Fenner died at his home in New Orleans. On the same day, the first issue of the Southern Journal of the Medical Sciences, with Fenner as senior editor, was published.

Fenner's son, Charles Erasmus Fenner, would go on to become a justice of the Louisiana Supreme Court.
