= Fenner & Beane =

Former US brokerage firm

- Type: Acquired
- Industry: Financial services
- Predecessor: Fenner, Gatling & Beane
- Founded: 1916
- Founder: Charles Erasmus Fenner; Alpheus Crosby Beane
- Fate: Acquired in 1941 by Merrill Lynch
- Successor: Merrill Lynch, Pierce, Fenner & Beane; Merrill Lynch, Pierce, Fenner & Smith
- Headquarters: New Orleans, Louisiana, United States
- Products: Brokerage, Futures exchange, Commodities

Fenner & Beane was a brokerage firm based in New Orleans, Louisiana. Founded in 1916 as Fenner Gatling & Beane, it was renamed in 1919. The firm was founded by the Beane Brothers, who were New Orleans cotton merchants, to manage their exposure to fluctuations in commodity prices.

== History ==
The firm's predecessor, Beane Brothers was founded in early 1900s by Alpheus Crosby ("Alph") Beane and his brothers Frank E. Beane Jr. and William Sterling Robert Beane. The firm traded primarily in cotton with offices in Columbus, Georgia, and New Orleans. Beane Brothers was dissolved about 1915, and in 1916 Alph Beane entered into a new brokerage firm Fenner, Gatling & Beane.

Beane's partner, Charles E. Fenner, came from a distinguished New Orleans family, as his cousin was a justice of the Louisiana Supreme Court. Confederate president Jefferson Davis died in the Fenner home in New Orleans in 1889.

The firm expanded quickly through the Southern states and Midwestern U.S. through the 1920s, focusing primarily on the trading of commodities, particularly futures contracts for grain and cotton. The firm was a member of the various commodity exchanges in New Orleans, Chicago, and Memphis, Tennessee. By the 1930s, Fenner & Beane had established itself as the second largest brokerage firm in the U.S. However, the firm was suffering from decreased trading volumes caused by the Great Depression. Following the death of Alph Beane in 1937, Charles Fenner and Alpheus Beane's son began discussions with Merrill Lynch about a potential merger. The merger was completed in August 1941 creating Merrill Lynch, Pierce, Fenner & Beane. The length of the name prompted outsiders to label the new firm "We the people" or "The thundering herd".

Alph Beane's son had come to work at Fenner & Beane in 1931 and would spend more than 25 years at the firm and later at Merrill Lynch before founding his own firm, which was later acquired by Reynolds & Company.

== Merger ==
In 1941, Fenner & Beane merged with what was then known as Merrill Lynch, E.A. Pierce and Cassatt to become Merrill Lynch, Pierce, Fenner & Beane. In 1957, Merrill discontinued the use of the name Beane, replacing it with Smith in recognition of Winthrop H. Smith, a longtime chief of the firm.
