= Piva =

Piva may refer to:

== Locations ==
- Piva (Drina), a river in Montenegro and Bosnia and Herzegovina
- Piva, Montenegro, a region in Montenegro and tribe
- Lake Piva, a reservoir in Montenegro
- Piva River, Bougainville, Papua New Guinea
- Piva Trail, Bougainville, Papua New Guinea
  - Battle for Piva Trail, 1943

== Other ==
- Piva language, a member of the Piva-Banoni languages
- Piva (bagpipe), an Italian folk instrument
- Piva (dance), a Renaissance dance
- Primrose International Viola Archive, or PIVA, a collection of viola music at Brigham Young University
