= List of raids =

A military raid is a mission where the main objective is to demoralize, destroy valuable enemy installations, free prisoners, gather intelligence, or capture or kill specific personnel. This contrasts to regular military operations where the end goal is to capture territory and advance. Raids are a quick attack, relying heavily on the element of surprise to achieve their objective. After the success or failure of the mission, the raiding force will attempt to retreat to friendly territory before the enemy is able to co-ordinate a counterattack.

Raids are favored by guerrilla, irregular, or special forces. Due to the disproportional affect that a raid can have on an enemy, relative to the attacker's strength and the duration of the attack, raids are a favored tactic in irregular warfare.

This article contains a list of military raids, not including air raids, sorted by the date at which they started:

Name	Date	Attackers	Defenders	Outcome
Mongol Raid into Hungary	1241	Mongol Empire	Kingdom of Hungary Kingdom of Croatia Teutonic Knights Knights Templar	Parts of the Kingdom of Hungary controlled by the Mongol Empire
Mongol Raid into Lithuania	1259	Mongol Empire	Grand Duchy of Lithuania	Lithuania left mostly untouched by the Mongol raid
Mongol raid into Poland	1259	Mongol Empire	Polish states and allies	Tactical Mongol victory
Mongol invasion of Byzantine Thrace	1265	Mongol Empire	Thrace	Thrace plundered by the Mongols
Second Mongol invasion of Lithuania	1275	Mongol Empire	Grand Duchy of Lithuania	
Third Mongol invasion of Poland	1287	Golden Horde; Kingdom of Galicia–Volhynia	Kingdom of Poland; Kingdom of Hungary	Polish victory; Mongol invasion repulsed
Chaseabout Raid	26 August 1565	Kingdom of Scotland	Protestant rebels	Victory for Mary, Queen of Scots
Raid of the Redeswire	7 July 1575	Kingdom of Scotland	Kingdom of England	Scottish victory
Raid of Ruthven	27 August 1582	Presbyterian nobles	Kingdom of Scotland	Short-lived Presbyterian victory
Raid on the Medway	6 June 1667	Dutch Republic	Kingdom of England	Decisive Dutch victory
Raid on Deerfield	29 February 1704	New England	French colonists Haudenosaunee; Abenaki; Wyandot; Pocumtuc; Pennacook	French and Native American victory
Raid on Pickawillany	21 June 1752	France: New France; Ojibwa Odawa	Great Britain: British America; Miami People	French allied victory
Meigs Raid	24 May 1777	United States	(Kingdom of Great Britain) Great Britain	American victory
Carleton's Raid	24 October 1778	(Kingdom of Great Britain) Great Britain	United States; Vermont Republic	British victory
Cherry Valley massacre	11 November 1778	(Kingdom of Great Britain) Great Britain; Seneca tribe Mohawk	United States	British victory
Battle of Paulus Hook	19 August 1779	United States	(Kingdom of Great Britain) Great Britain	American Victory
Battle of Musgrove Mill	18 August 1780	United States	(Kingdom of Great Britain) Great Britain	American Victory
Battle of Wahab's Plantation	21 September 1780	United States	(Kingdom of Great Britain) Great Britain	American Victory
Royalton raid	16 October 1780	(Kingdom of Great Britain) Great Britain	Vermont Republic	British victory
Battle of Fort St. George	23 November 1780	United States	(Kingdom of Great Britain) Great Britain	American Victory
Raid on Gananoque	21 September 1812	United States	(United Kingdom) Upper Canada	American victory
Capture of HMS Caledonia and HMS Detroit	9 October 1812	United States	United Kingdom	American victory
Battle of St. Regis	22 October 1812	United States	United Kingdom	American victory
Battle of Frenchman's Creek	28 November 1812	United States	United Kingdom	American victory
Battle of the Mississinewa	17-18 December 1812	United States	United Kingdom	American victory
Raid on Elizabethtown	7 February 1813	United States	United Kingdom	American victory
Battle of York	22 April 1813	United States	United Kingdom	American victory
Raid On Philipsburg	11-12 October 1813	United States	United Kingdom	American victory
Raid on Fort Oswego	6 May 1814	United Kingdom	United States	British victory
Raid on Alexandria	20 August 1814	United Kingdom	United States	British victory
Battle of Longwoods	4 March 1814	United States	United Kingdom	American Tactical victory
Raid on Port Dover	14-16 May 1814	United States	United Kingdom	American victory
McArthur's Raid	6 November 1814	United States	United Kingdom	American victory
Andrews' Raid	12 April 1862	United States (Union)	(Confederate States of America) CSA (Confederacy)	Union victory
Newburgh Raid	18 July 1862	(Confederate States of America) CSA (Confederacy)	United States (Union)	Confederate victory
Raid on Chambersburg	October 1862	(Confederate States of America) CSA (Confederacy)	United States (Union)	Confederate victory
Sinking Creek Raid	26 November 1862	United States (Union)	(Confederate States of America) CSA (Confederacy)	Union victory
West Tennessee Raids	December 1862 – January 1863	(Confederate States of America) CSA (Confederacy)	United States (Union)	Confederate victory
Mosby's Raid on Herndon Station	17 March 1863	(Confederate States of America) CSA (Confederacy)	United States (Union)	Confederate victory
Grierson's Raid	April – May 1863	United States (Union)	(Confederate States of America) CSA (Confederacy)	Union victory
Streight's Raid	April – May 1863	United States (Union)	(Confederate States of America) CSA (Confederacy)	Confederate victory
Stoneman's 1863 raid	April – May 1863	United States (Union)	(Confederate States of America) CSA (Confederacy)	Confederate victory
Jones–Imboden Raid	April – May 1863	(Confederate States of America) CSA (Confederacy)	United States (Union)	Confederate victory
Hines' Raid	June 1863	(Confederate States of America) CSA (Confederacy)	United States (Union)	Union victory
Raid on Combahee Ferry	June 1863	United States (Union)	(Confederate States of America) CSA (Confederacy)	Union victory
Morgan's Raid	June – July 1863	(Confederate States of America) CSA (Confederacy)	United States (Union)	Union victory
Wytheville Raid	18 July 1863	United States (Union)	(Confederate States of America) CSA (Confederacy)	Union victory
Quantrill's Raid	21 August 1863	(Confederate States of America) CSA (Confederacy)	United States (Union)	Confederate victory
Shelby's Raid (1863)	September – October 1863	(Confederate States of America) CSA (Confederacy)	United States (Union)	Confederate victory
Wheeler's October 1863 Raid	October 1863	(Confederate States of America) CSA (Confederacy)	United States (Union)	Inconclusive
Dahlgren Raid	February – March 1864	United States (Union)	(Confederate States of America) CSA (Confederacy)	Confederate victory
Wilson–Kautz Raid	June – July 1864	United States (Union)	(Confederate States of America) CSA (Confederacy)	Inconclusive
Gilmor's Raid	July 1864	(Confederate States of America) CSA (Confederacy)	United States (Union)	Confederate victory
Price's Raid	August – December 1864	(Confederate States of America) CSA (Confederacy)	United States (Union)	Union victory
Beefsteak Raid	September 1864	(Confederate States of America) CSA (Confederacy)	United States (Union)	Confederate victory
St. Albans Raid	19 October 1864	(Confederate States of America) CSA (Confederacy)	United States (Union)	Confederate victory
The Burning Raid	November – December 1864	United States (Union)	(Confederate States of America) CSA (Confederacy)	Union victory
Stoneman's 1864 raid	December 1864	United States (Union)	(Confederate States of America) CSA (Confederacy)	Union victory
Stoneman's 1865 raid	March – April 1865	United States (Union)	(Confederate States of America) CSA (Confederacy)	Union victory
Wilson's Raid	March – April 1865	United States (Union)	(Confederate States of America) CSA (Confederacy)	Union victory
Fenian raids	April 1866	Fenian Brotherhood: Irish Republican Brotherhood; United States(Alleged)	(United Kingdom) British Empire: Canada (1867–71); (United Kingdom) Province of Canada (1866)	Stalemate; Fenian raids cease
Warren Wagon Train raid	18 May 1871	Kiowa	United States	Native American victory
Jesse James Northfield Raid	6 September 1876	Law enforcement	James-Younger Gang	Destruction of the gang
Jameson Raid	29 December 1895	(United Kingdom) Cecil Rhodes (United Kingdom) Leander Starr Jameson (United Kingdom) Reform Committee	South African Republic	South African victory
Bezdany raid	26 September 1908	Polish revolutionaries	Russian Empire	Polish success
Raid on Scarborough, Hartlepool and Whitby	16 December 1914	German Empire	United Kingdom	German victory
Russian raid on Gotland	2 July 1915	Russian Empire United Kingdom	German Empire	Allied victory
Zeebrugge Raid	23 April 1918	United Kingdom	German Empire	Indecisive
Malgaç Raid	16 June 1919	Kuva-yi Milliye	Kingdom of Greece	Turkish victory
Soviet raid on Stołpce	3 August 1924	Soviet Union	Poland	Soviet victory
Chittagong armoury raid	18 April 1930	Indian revolutionaries	Chittagong police force	Revolutionaries fail to complete objective
Christmas Raid	23 December 1939	Irish Republican Army (IRA)	(Republic of Ireland) Irish Army	Initial completion of objectives; equipment recovered shortly after
Operation Ambassador	14 July 1940	United Kingdom	Nazi Germany	Nazi victory
Operation Colossus	10 February 1941	United Kingdom	Italy	British victory
Operation Claymore	4 March 1941	United Kingdom; Norway	Nazi Germany	British victory
Operation Savanna	15 March 1941	United Kingdom; Free France	Nazi Germany	Nazi victory
Bardia raid	19-20 April 1941	United Kingdom; Australia	Nazi Germany (Kingdom of Italy) Italy	Allied victory
Raid on Alexandria (1941)	19 December 1941	(Kingdom of Italy) Italy	United Kingdom	Italian victory
Operation Anklet	26 December 1941	United Kingdom; Norway; Poland	Nazi Germany	Allied victory
Operation Archery	27 December 1941	United Kingdom; Norway	Nazi Germany	Allied victory
Operation Biting	28 February 1942	United Kingdom	Nazi Germany	British victory
St. Nazaire Raid	27 March 1942	United Kingdom	Nazi Germany	British victory (all objectives complete)
Indian Ocean raid	31 March 1942	Empire of Japan	United Kingdom; Australia; Netherlands Netherlands; United States; Canada	Japanese victory
Operation Albumen	7-8 June 1942, 4–5 July 1943	United Kingdom Greece Free French	Nazi Germany	Allied victory
Makin Island raid	17 August 1942	United States	Empire of Japan	American victory
Dieppe Raid	19 August 1942	Canada; United Kingdom; Poland	Nazi Germany	German victory
Tatsinskaya Raid	16 December 1942	Soviet Union	Nazi Germany	Soviet victory
Operation Chestnut	12 July 1943	United Kingdom	(Kingdom of Italy) Italy	British failure
The Gran Sasso Raid	12 September 1943	Nazi Germany	(Kingdom of Italy) Italy	Mussolini successfully rescued
Operation Jaywick	26 September 1943	Z Special Unit (Allies)	Empire of Japan	Allied victory
Operation Begonia	2 October 1943	United Kingdom	(Kingdom of Italy) Italy	50 POWs rescued
Operation Candytuft	27 October 1943	United Kingdom	(Kingdom of Italy) Italy Nazi Germany	British victory
Operation Saxifrage	27 October 1943	United Kingdom	(Kingdom of Italy) Italy	Rail lines successfully cut
Raid on Choiseul	28 October 1943	United States; Australia	Empire of Japan	Indecisive
Raid on Koiari	28-29 November 1943	United States	Empire of Japan	Japanese Victory
Operation Baobab	30 January 1944	United Kingdom	(Kingdom of Italy) Italy	British victory
Brécourt Manor Assault	6 June 1944	United States	Nazi Germany	American Victory
Operation Cooney	7 June 1944	(Free France) Free French Forces	Nazi Germany	Tactically indecisive Strategic Allied victory
Operation Gaff	25 June 1944	United Kingdom	Nazi Germany	Objective not completed
Raid on Symi	13-15 July 1944	United Kingdom; Kingdom of Greece	Nazi Germany; Italian Social Republic	Allied victory
Operation Dunhill	3 August 1944	United Kingdom	Nazi Germany	Objectives completed
Raid at Ožbalt	31 August 1944	Slovene Partisans	Nazi Germany	Slovene victory
Operation Greif	16 December 1944	Nazi Germany	United Kingdom United States	German failure
Raid at Cabanatuan	30 January 1945	United States: Commonwealth of the Philippines	Empire of Japan: Second Philippine Republic	Allied victory; 552 POWs liberated
Operation Cold Comfort	17 February 1945	United Kingdom	Nazi Germany	British failure
Raid at Los Baños	23 February 1945	United States: Commonwealth of the Philippines	Empire of Japan: Second Philippine Republic	Allied victory; 2,147 Allied civilians and military personnel liberated
Granville Raid	8 March 1945	Nazi Germany	United States United Kingdom	German victory
Operation Tombola	23 March 1945	United Kingdom Italian resistance movement	Nazi Germany	Allied victory
Operation Roast	1 April 1945	United Kingdom	Nazi Germany	British victory
Operation Claret	July 1964 - July 1966	United Kingdom	Indonesia	Objective complete; Indonesian forces kept off balance
Operation Danube	20-21 August 1968	Warsaw Pact: Soviet Union; Poland; Hungary; Bulgaria; East Germany	Czechoslovakia	Mission successful: Prague Airport captured; Major military bases, centers and significant government buildings captured
Operation Bulmus 6	19 July 1969	Israel Defense Forces	Egypt; (Palestine) As-Sa'iqa	Mission successful, all Egyptian facilities destroyed; 6 attackers KIA and 11 wounded; 80 defenders KIA; Targeted radar installation determined to be fake
Operation Ivory Coast	21 November 1970	United States	North Vietnam	Mission failure
Operation Green Sea	22 November 1970	(Portugal) Portuguese Military (Guinea) Guinean dissident forces	(Guinea) Guinean People's Militia; PAIGC	Limited Portuguese success; liberation of all 26 POWs and enemy naval and air assets destroyed: Failure to capture or kill Amílcar Cabral and Ahmed Sékou Touré
Operation Entebbe	3 July 1976	Israel	PFLP-EO; Revolutionary Cells; Uganda	Mission successful; 102 of 106 hostages rescued
Operation Eland	9 August 1976	Rhodesia	ZANLA (ZANU) Mozambique	Decisive Rhodesian victory
Operation Dingo	23-25 November 1977	Rhodesia	Zimbabwe African National Liberation Army	Decisive Rhodesian victory
Coup of the Republic of Afghanistan	27-28 April 1978	PDPA: Supported by: Soviet Union; KGB	Republic of Afghanistan	Mission successful; Mohammed Daoud Khan overthrown and assassinated
Operation Storm-333	27 December 1979	Soviet Union	Democratic Republic of Afghanistan	Soviet victory; Hafizullah Amin assassinated
Operation Eagle Claw	24 April 1980	United States	Iran: Muslim Student Followers of the Imam's Line	Mission failure
Operation Nimrod	5 May 1980	United Kingdom	Democratic Revolutionary Front for the Liberation of Arabistan (DRFLA)	Mission successful; 24 of 26 hostages rescued
Raid on Pebble Island	14 May 1982	United Kingdom	Argentina	British victory
Operation Destroy	19 November 1985	Malaysia: PDRM	Pan-Malaysian Islamic Party	Malaysian victory: Ibrahim Mahmud killed
Operation Flavius	6 March 1988	United Kingdom	Provisional Irish Republican Army	3 IRA paramilitaries killed
Operation Acid Gambit	20 December 1989	United States	Panama	Mission successful; hostage rescued
Raid at Renacer Prison	20 December 1989	United States	Panama Defense Force	Mission successful; 64 hostages rescued
Borovo Selo raid	2 May 1991	Croatia	SAO Krajina; White Eagles	SAO Krajina and White Eagles victory
Battle of Mogadishu	3 October 1993	UNOSOM II: United States; Pakistan; Malaysia	Somali National Alliance (SNA); Al-Qaeda	Strategic SNA victory
Operation Chavín de Huántar	22 April 1997	Peru	Túpac Amaru Revolutionary Movement	Peruvian victory: Hostages rescued
Sauk siege	5 July 2000	Malaysia: Malaysian Army; Royal Malaysia Police	Al Ma'unah terrorist group	Malaysian military victory
Operation Barras	10 September 2000	United Kingdom	West Side Boys	Mission successful; 5 hostages and 21 additional civilians rescued
Alkhan-Kala raid	22-28 June 2001	Russian Federation	Chechen Republic of Ichkeria	Russian victory: Arbi Barayev assassinated
Operation Rhino	19-20 October 2001	United States	Islamic Emirate of Afghanistan	American victory
Operation Condor	17 May 2002	United Kingdom	(Afghanistan) Taliban insurgents Al-Qaeda	British victory
2004 Nazran raid	21 June 2004	Caucasian Front; Chechen Republic of Ichkeria	Russian Federation: Ingushetia	Chechen and Ingush separatist victory
2004 Avtury raid	12 July 2004	Chechen Republic of Ichkeria Arab Mujahideen	Chechen Republic; Russian Federation	Rebel victory
2004 Grozny raid	21 August 2004	Chechen Republic; Russian Federation	Chechen Republic of Ichkeria	Russian victory
2005 Dagestan Raids	15 January 2005	Russia; Dagestan	Shariat Jamaat	Russian victory
Lake Tharthar raid	23 March 2005	New Iraqi Army United States	(Iraq) Iraqi insurgents	Iraqi security forces victory
2005 Nalchik raid	13 October 2005	Yarmuk Jamaat	Russian Federation	Russian victory
Dalola raid	1 May 2006	Janjaweed	Chad	Janjaweed victory
2006 Hezbollah cross-border raid	12 July 2006	Hezbollah	Israel Defense Forces	Mission successful
Tyre raid	4 August 2006	Israel Defense Forces	Hezbollah	Mission failure
Karbala provincial headquarters raid	20 January 2007	Asa'ib Ahl al-Haq Supported by: Quds Force; Hezbollah	United States	Mission successful
Raid on Poti	12 August 2008	Russia	Georgia	Russian victory: Georgian torpedo and missile boats destroyed
2009 Baraawe raid	14 September 2009	United States	Al-Qaeda; Al-Shabaab	American victory: Saleh Ali Saleh Nabhan killed
2010 Tsentoroy attack	29 August 2010	Vilayat Nokhchicho	Kadyrovtsy; Pro-Moscow Chechen Law Enforcement	Russian victory: Chechen rebels successfully repelled
Death of Osama bin Laden	2 May 2011	United States	Al-Qaeda	American victory: Osama bin Laden killed
Rescue of Jessica Buchanan and Poul Hagen Thisted	25 January 2012	United States	Somali Pirates	American victory: Both Hostages successfully rescued and all 9 Pirates killed
Kunar Raid	17 February 2012	NATO: United States Air Force	(Afghanistan) Taliban	Mission failure; 6 civilian casualties
Al-Otaiba ambush	26 February 2014	Hezbollah	Al-Nusra Front	Successful ambush: Over a hundred of Al nusra militants killed
Crimean Parliament raid	27 February 2014	Russia	Ukraine	Russian victory: Parliament building captured
Simferopol raid	18 March 2014	Russia	Ukraine	Russian victory: Ukrainian military base captured
Raid of the 95th Brigade	19 July - 10 August 2014	Ukraine	Russia; Russian separatist forces in Ukraine	Ukrainian victory: Ukrainian forces able to safely retreat from ATO zone
May 2015 U.S. special forces raid in Syria	15 May 2015	United States: United Kingdom (surveillance)	Daesh	American victory: Abu Sayyaf killed
2015 Myanmar cross-border raid	9 June 2015	India	NSCN-K; Kanglei Yawol Kanna Lup	Indian victory
2016 Indian Line of Control strike	28-29 September 2016	India	Lashkar-e-Taiba	Indian victory
Mohmand Valley raid	26-27 April 2017	United States	Daesh	American victory • Emir of ISIL-KP killed
Al Hathla Raid	23 May 2017	United States	Al-Qaeda in the Arabian Peninsula	American victory
Barisha raid	26-27 October 2019	United States	Daesh	American victory • Abu Bakr al-Baghdadi killed
2020 Nigeria hostage rescue	31 October 2020	United States	Nigerian Bandits	American victory • Hostage Successfully Rescued
2022 Panjgur and Naushki raids	2 February 2022	Pakistan	Baluch Liberation Front	Mission successful
October 7 attacks	7 October 2023	Hamas	Israel	Successful, Hamas were able to murder unarmed civilians and capture a few soldiers and many civilians to exchange with convicted terrorists and criminal Palestinians.
