= Robert H. Williams (soldier) =

USMC Navy Cross recipient

Robert Hugh Williams
- Born: c. 1908 Arbor Vitae, Wisconsin, U.S.
- Died: February 15, 1983 (aged 75) Wales, Wisconsin, U.S.
- Allegiance: United States of America
- Branch: United States Marine Corps
- Rank: Brigadier General
- Commands: 1st Parachute Battalion; 1st Parachute Regiment; 3rd Marine Regiment; Marine Barracks, Washington, D.C.
- Conflicts: World War II: Battle of Gavutu; Raid on Choiseul; Bougainville campaign; Battle of Iwo Jima
- Awards: Navy Cross; Silver Star; Purple Heart

Robert Hugh Williams (c. 1908 – February 15, 1983) was a highly decorated United States Marine Corps brigadier general. He was one of the first Paramarine officers and was awarded the Navy Cross during the battle of Gavutu.

== Early life and career ==
Robert H. Williams was born circa 1908 in Arbor Vitae, Wisconsin. In 1929, Williams graduated from Ohio State University and was commissioned as a second lieutenant in the Marine Corps. During the 1930s, he was stationed in Shanghai, China with the 4th Marine Regiment.

=== Paramarines ===
When the Paramarines were formed in October 1940, Captain Williams became one of the first officers to graduate from parachute training. On March 22, 1941, he assumed command of the newly formed 2nd Parachute Company in San Diego, California. The 2nd Parachute Company was redesignated as Company A, 2nd Parachute Battalion, before moving to Quantico, Virginia in the summer of 1941.

The 2nd Battalion merged with the 1st Parachute Battalion and Captain Williams assumed command of a second company. Williams had his two companies conduct many conditioning hikes and calisthenic exercises, as he believed the paratroopers were a "new form of infantry." A reporter from Time magazine noted the Paramarines looked tougher than typical Marine infantry units.

Williams also had his Marines conduct several training jumps. One jump in late July showed the effectiveness of the Paramarines, when they landed amid the Army's 44th Infantry Division in Fredericksburg, Virginia. The surprised Army leaders mistook the Marines as an enemy force. The jump also displayed some of the dangers, as high winds blew about 40 Marines off course into a tree grove.

In August, the first large-scale landing exercise was conducted. Captain Williams' company was assigned to secure a vital crossroads behind enemy lines and then attack the rear of the enemy. However, landing operations commenced slowly as there were only two transport planes to embark the Marines. One of Williams' squads was designated as the opposing force and dropped behind the lines of the 1st Marine Division and 1st Infantry Division, causing much havoc for several hours. This demonstrated a greater need for command post security from enemy paratroopers.

The leader of the exercise, General Holland M. Smith, recognized the value of airborne units and recommended for an entire brigade to be formed. However, the Paramarines continued to grow at a slow rate. Williams later assumed command of the 1st Parachute Battalion in October 1941.

== World War II ==
From May to July 1942, the 1st Parachute Battalion deployed to New Zealand. The Paramarines did not stay in New Zealand very long, as they learned they would be assaulting Gavutu in the Solomon Islands in August. On July 18, the entire battalion sailed to Koro Island, Fiji aboard the USS Heywood. Major Williams' battalion conducted two amphibious landing rehearsals by the end of July.

=== Battle of Gavutu ===
At 0800 on August 7, two Marine battalions landed unopposed on the island of Tulagi. The Paramarines assaulted Gavutu at 1200 following a naval bombardment. The bombardment, however, did little to suppress Japanese defenses and destroyed a seaplane ramp the Marines planned to land on, forcing the Higgins boats to be slightly diverted.

While Company A initially landed unopposed, they advanced just 75 yards toward Hill 148 when they came under heavy fire. Companies B and C landed soon after, but several officers were killed early in the battle. Major Williams began leading his Marines up Hill 148 at 1220 when he was shot in his side and incapacitated. The enemy fire was so intense that Marines were unable to drag Williams to cover.

The battalion executive officer, Major Charles A. Miller assumed command and the Paramarines eventually secured Gavutu by 1800. That night, the wounded, to include Major Williams, were evacuated from the island. For his actions during the battle, Williams was awarded the Navy Cross.

=== Later Paramarine operations ===
Lieutenant Colonel Williams returned to his battalion and took command in September 1942, after the Paramarines were moved to Camp Kiser in New Caledonia. At Camp Kiser, Williams had his Marines make several hikes and they performed their first training jump in months that November. They also trained in jungle warfare.

The 2nd Parachute Battalion arrived at Camp Kiser in January 1943, followed by the 3rd Parachute Battalion in March. With all three battalions together, the 1st Marine Parachute Regiment was formed on April 1, with Williams assigned as the first commanding officer of the unit. The regiment's last training jump was conducted at night by the 2nd Battalion in May. It went poorly however, as the planes flew off course into a hilly, wooded area during which one Paramarine was killed.

From October 28 to November 3, the 2nd Battalion performed a diversionary operation at Choiseul, which Williams later remarked was "a brilliant little bit of work." In late November, Williams' regiment arrived at Bougainville to assist in the campaign. The regiment took part in operations there until January 1944, when they sailed back to Guadalcanal and Williams relinquished command.

=== 5th Marine Division ===
The 1st Parachute Regiment was disbanded in February and the Paramarines were reassigned to the newly formed 5th Marine Division. Williams himself was assigned as the executive officer of the 28th Marine Regiment.

On February 19, 1945, the 28th Marines landed at Green Beach during the battle of Iwo Jima. The regiment sustained severe casualties and the advance on Mount Suribachi was delayed. Williams moved to the front line and directed his Marines in the assault, ultimately resulting in the capture of Mount Suribachi by February 23. Williams and the 28th Marines continued fighting until the island was secured on March 26. For his actions throughout the battle, Williams was awarded the Silver Star.

== Later career and life ==
After the war, Williams served as a student and an instructor at several interservice schools. From August 1952 to March 1954, Williams was the commanding officer of the 3rd Marine Regiment, 3rd Marine Division. During his command, the 3rd Marines deployed to Camp Gifu, Japan. Williams final assignment was as the commandant of the Marine Barracks, Washington, D.C. Williams retired from the Marines in 1956 and was advanced to the rank of brigadier general.

Williams later earned a master's degree in political science from the University of Wisconsin. He then became a senior researcher at the Brookings Institution and a military affairs consultant for the Department of Defense. Williams focused on studying counter-insurgency warfare, traveling around the world to countries including Vietnam, Thailand, and Iran, before retiring in 1970.

Robert H. Williams died of cancer on February 15, 1983, at his home near Wales, Wisconsin.

== See also ==
Military offices
Preceded by Marcellus J. Howard	Commanding Officer of the 1st Parachute Battalion; October 2, 1941 – August 7, 1942; First term	Succeeded by Charles A. Miller
Preceded by Harry L. Torgerson	Commanding Officer of the 1st Parachute Battalion; September 27, 1942 – March 31, 1943; Second term	Succeeded by Brooke H. Hatch
Preceded by Unit activated	Commanding Officer of the 1st Parachute Regiment; April 1, 1943 – January 15, 1944	Succeeded by Richard Fagan
Preceded by John G. Bouker	Commanding Officer of the 3rd Marine Regiment; August 2, 1952 – March 27, 1954	Succeeded by Eugene H. Strayhorn
