= Paramarines =

- 1st Marine Parachute Regiment insignia
- Active: October 26, 1940 – February 29, 1944
- Disbanded: 1944
- Country: United States
- Branch: United States Marine Corps
- Type: Airborne forces
- Role: Airfield seizure Amphibious warfare Close-quarters combat Direct action Forward observer Indirect fire Jungle warfare Long-range penetration Mountain warfare Parachuting; Patrolling; Raiding; Reconnaissance; Special reconnaissance Tracking
- Size: Regiment
- Engagements: World War II; Guadalcanal campaign; Battle of Tulagi and Gavutu–Tanambogo; Battle of Edson's Ridge; Solomon Islands campaign; Raid on Choiseul; Bougainville campaign; Raid on Koiari

Commanders
- Notable commanders: Victor H. Krulak; Robert H. Williams

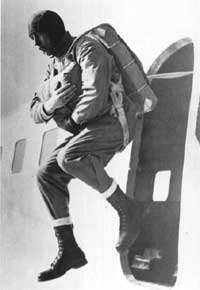
Paramarine in training at NAS Lakehurst in 1942

The Paramarines (also known as Marine paratroopers) was a short-lived specialized combat unit of the United States Marine Corps, trained to be paratroopers dropped from planes by parachute. Marine parachute training which began in New Jersey in October 1940 ended with the parachute units being disbanded at Camp Pendleton, California in February 1944. Paratroopers received a significantly increased salary after completing training, so there was no shortage of volunteers, although all were required to be unmarried. Standards of fitness were high, and 40% failed the training course.

== History ==
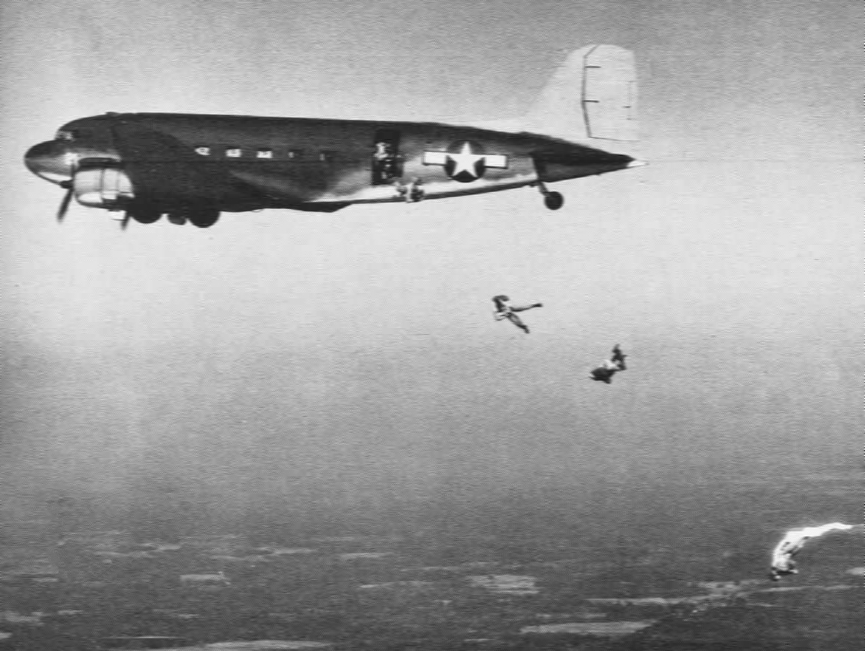
Marines make a high-altitude jump from a Douglas R4D, in late 1943

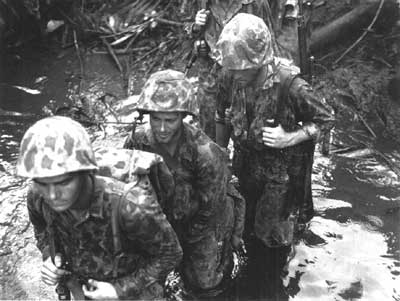
A file of parachutists crosses a stream on Bougainville in November 1943

The first cohort of Marine paratroopers trained at NAS Lakehurst in New Jersey in October 1940, eventually becoming the 1st Marine Parachute Battalion. They were followed by a second group in December 1940, forming the 2nd Marine Parachute Battalion. A third class trained at Camp Kearny in San Diego, California in early 1941, eventually forming the 3rd Marine Parachute Battalion. After the United States entered World War II, the training program was stepped up, and a special training camp and parachute training school was opened temporarily at Camp Elliott in San Diego in May 1942, next to Camp Kearny, moving to purpose-built accommodation nearby at Camp Gillespie in September 1942. A second training camp and parachute training school opened at Hadnot Point on the New River in North Carolina in June 1942, but closed in July 1943.

The Marine parachute battalion was organized into three rifle companies and a headquarters company consisting of the headquarters elements and a demolition platoon. Each rifle company consisted of three rifle platoons with each platoon equipped with rifles, light machine guns, and a 60mm mortar.

The 1st Parachute Battalion was attached to the 1st Marine Division for the invasion of Guadalcanal. The unit departed Norfolk, Virginia on 10 June 1942 aboard the stores ship USS Mizar arriving at Wellington, New Zealand 11 July 1942. On 7 August 1942 the unit conducted an amphibious assault on the small island of Gavutu and later seized the neighboring island of Tanambogo along with other Marine units. The battalion later moved to Guadalcanal, fighting alongside the 1st Marine Raiders in the Tasimboko raid and the Battle of Edson's Ridge. The high casualties suffered by the Marine paratroopers led the battalion to be withdrawn to Camp Kiser in Tontouta, New Caledonia in September.

Prior to the main landing on Bougainville, where both the 1st and 3rd Parachute Battalions would eventually see action, the 2nd Parachute Battalion performed a diversionary raid on Choiseul Island, from October 27 - November 4, 1943.

The three parachute battalions, with approximately 3,000 members, had become the 1st Marine Parachute Regiment of the I Marine Amphibious Corps. Four parachute operations were planned but never executed:

- Capturing Villa airfield on Kolombangara as part of Operation Cartwheel to support the New Georgia campaign in July 1943
- Capturing the Kahili and Kara airfields on Bougainville in September 1943
- Capturing Kavieng in New Britain in April 1944
- Capturing a Japanese seaplane base at Rekata Bay, Santa Isabel Island (but the Japanese evacuated the base in September 1943)

However, the need for and cost of a parachute corps in the Marines was questioned, as were other specialized elite units, such as the Marine Raiders. The Marine Corps also lacked the transport aircraft required for a massed parachute drop. On 30 December 1943, Marine Commandant Thomas Holcomb ordered the 1st Marine Parachute Regiment to be disbanded, and along with the Marine Raider units, it officially ceased to exist on 29 February 1944.

Apart from a small group including Peter Julien Ortiz who were parachuted into France as part of an Office of Strategic Services team to support the French Resistance, the Paramarines never dropped by parachute into combat, but were utilized during beach raids in the Pacific campaign, including at Guadalcanal. Paramarines at San Diego were transferred to the 5th Marine Division which landed on Iwo Jima on February 19, 1945. Former Paramarines, Cpl. Harlon H. Block and Pfc. Ira H. Hayes, assisted in the raising of the American flag on Mount Suribachi on 23 February 1945, depicted in Joe Rosenthal's iconic photograph. A third former Paramarine, Sgt. Henry O. "Hank" Hansen, had participated in the first American flag-raising earlier that day. Four of the 82 Marine Medal of Honor recipients in World War II were former Paramarines who were awarded the medal for their heroic actions on Iwo Jima.

== Modern day ==
The modern-day U.S. Marine Corps does not maintain any exclusively dedicated parachute infantry units, though some elite formations are trained and capable of parachute jumps if needed. Ever since the disbanding of the 1st Parachute Regiment in 1944, Marines and sailors have continued to volunteer for paratrooper training at Fort Benning, Georgia. Once a Marine has completed United States Army Airborne School, they are authorized to wear the coveted "Jump Wings" on their camouflage utility uniforms while in garrison. Marines who are awarded the gold Navy & Marine Corps Parachutist Badge often do so as part of their MOS/billet training, such as MARSOC, Force Reconnaissance, Radio Reconnaissance Platoon, EOD, 3rd, 4th, and 6th ANGLICO, JTAC, Parachute rigger, or as part of a reenlistment incentive.

== United States Marine Corps parachute team ==
The only official U.S. Marine Corps sport parachute team began in January 1965 and retired in July 1965, when the same personnel became the men's US Parachute Team at the Adriatic Cup in Portorož, Yugoslavia.

Team members were Robert Mathews, Dick Myron, Dave Becker, Tom Dougher, Ed Mikelaitis, Andre Smith, John Freitas, and Bob Armstrong. Captain Mathews was team captain, the others were NCOs. Major Wilbur Dinegar was team leader. Sergeant Jim Vance was team rigger. Daryl Henry was team coach, recommended by parachutist Jacques-André Istel.

The team was billeted at El Toro MCAS in California and jumped at Elsinore, Oceanside and El Centro, depending upon weather, having a brace of H-34s and an equipment truck at its disposal. The team represented the U.S. at the CISM games in Rio de Janeiro, Brazil, in April, where they won the overall gold medal.

The team then disbanded, but was resurrected two months later to compete against the U.S. Army Parachute Team to determine who would represent the United States at the 1965 Adriatic Cup. The Marines won, were designated the U.S. Men's Team, and competed at Portorož. They made a respectable showing, although the competition was stiffer than in Rio with the Eastern Bloc teams dominating the meet.

At the end of July, the team officially disbanded and all personnel returned to their duty stations, which in many cases included postings to Vietnam.

== See also ==
- List of United States Marine Corps battalions
- Former United States special operations units
- Rikusentai, the Japanese equivalent of the Paramarines
