= Victor H. Krulak =

United States Marine Corps general

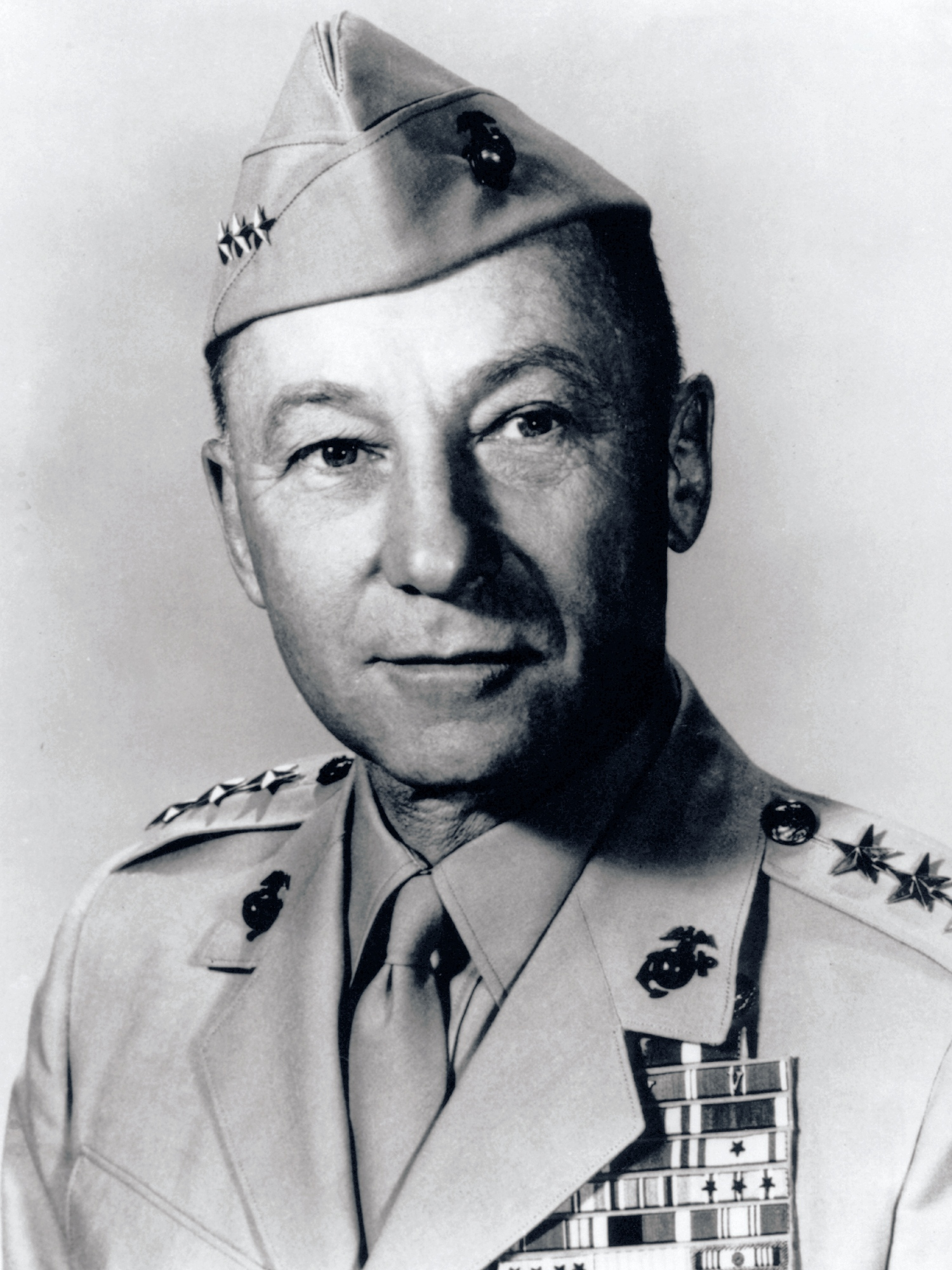
- Born: Victor Harold Krulak; January 7, 1913; Denver, Colorado, U.S.
- Died: December 29, 2008 (aged 95); San Diego, California, U.S.
- Burial place: Fort Rosecrans National Cemetery, San Diego
- Spouse: Amy Chandler (m. 1936; died 2004)
- Children: 3, including Charles
- Military career
- Allegiance: United States
- Branch: United States Marine Corps
- Service years: 1934–1968
- Rank: Lieutenant general
- Nickname: "Brute"
- Service number: 0-4990
- Commands: Fleet Marine Force, Pacific; Marine Corps Recruit Depot San Diego; 5th Marine Regiment; 2nd Parachute Battalion
- Conflicts: World War II; Operation Cartwheel; Battle of Vella Lavella; Raid on Choiseul; Battle of Okinawa; Korean War; Battle of Inchon; Second Battle of Seoul; Battle of Chosin Reservoir; Vietnam War
- Awards: Navy Cross; Navy Distinguished Service Medal; Legion of Merit (3); Bronze Star Medal (with "V"); Purple Heart; Air Medal
- Other work: Newspaper columnist

Victor Harold Krulak (January 7, 1913 – December 29, 2008) was a decorated United States Marine Corps officer who saw action in World War II, Korea and Vietnam. Krulak, considered a visionary by fellow Marines, was the author of First to Fight: An Inside View of the U.S. Marine Corps and the father of the 31st Commandant of the Marine Corps, General Charles C. Krulak.

== Personal life ==
Krulak was born in Denver, Colorado, to Jewish parents, Bessie (Zall) and Morris Krulak. He later denied Jewish ancestry and claimed to have been raised Episcopalian. He was married to Amy Chandler. The couple had three sons: Victor, Jr., an Episcopalian minister and former Navy chaplain; William, a former Marine; and Charles, who became a commandant of the Marine Corps.

== Career ==
Krulak was commissioned a United States Marine Corps second lieutenant upon graduation from the United States Naval Academy on May 31, 1934. Of diminutive stature, to receive his commission, Krulak received an exemption; (Note: Krulak was 5 foot 4 inches tall.) he was nevertheless a keen wrestler while at the Naval Academy, earning the nickname "Brute". In 1936, Lt. Krulak was coxswain in Navy's unsuccessful eight-man boat at the Olympic trials in Princeton, NJ.

His early Marine Corps service included sea duty aboard USS Arizona, an assignment at the United States Naval Academy; duty with the 6th Marines in San Diego and the 4th Marines in China (1937–39); completion of the Junior School, Quantico, Virginia (1940); and an assignment with the 1st Marine Brigade, FMF, later the 1st Marine Division.

While stationed as an observer in Shanghai during the Second Sino-Japanese War in 1937, Krulak took photographs with a telephoto lens of a ramp-bowed landing boat that the Japanese had been using. Recognizing the potential use of such a craft by the U.S. armed forces, Krulak sent details and photographs back to Washington, but discovered years later that they had been filed away as having come from "some nut out in China". (Note: His report, "Japanese Assault Boats; Shanghai, 1937", prompted his assignment to work with Andrew Higgins on design and testing the "Higgins Boat".) Krulak built a model of the Japanese boat design and discussed the retractable ramp approach with boat builder Andrew Higgins who incorporated elements of Krulak's input into the Landing Craft, Vehicle, Personnel (LCVP) or "Higgins boat", which played critical roles in the Normandy Landings and amphibious assaults in the Pacific.

=== World War II ===
At the outbreak of World War II, Krulak was a captain serving as aide to General Holland M. Smith, the commanding general, Amphibious Corps, Atlantic Fleet. He volunteered for parachute training and on completion of training, he was ordered to the Pacific area as commander of the 2nd Parachute Battalion, 1st Marine Amphibious Corps. He went into action at Vella Lavella with the New Zealanders.

As a lieutenant colonel in the fall of 1943, he earned the Navy Cross and the Purple Heart on Choiseul Island, where his battalion staged a week-long diversionary raid to cover the Bougainville invasion. Later, he joined the newly formed 6th Marine Division and took part in the Okinawa campaign and the surrender of Japanese forces in the China area, earning the Legion of Merit with "V" device for valor and the Bronze Star.

Krulak's Navy Cross citation reads:

The President of the United States takes pleasure in presenting the Navy Cross to Victor H. Krulak (0-4990), Lieutenant Colonel, U.S. Marine Corps, for extraordinary heroism and distinguished service as Commanding Officer of the Second Battalion, FIRST Marine Parachute Regiment, during operations on Choiseul Island, Solomon Islands, 28 October 1943 to 3 November 1943. Assigned the task of diverting hostile attention from the movements of our main attack force en route to Empress Augusta Bay, Bougainville Island, Lieutenant Colonel Krulak landed at Choiseul and daringly directed the attack of his battalion against the Japanese, destroying hundreds of tons of supplies and burning camps and landing barges. Although wounded during the assault on 30 October he repeatedly refused to relinquish his command and with dauntless courage and tenacious devotion to duty, continued to lead his battalion against the numerically superior Japanese forces. His brilliant leadership and indomitable fighting spirit assured the success of this vital mission and were in keeping with the highest traditions of the United States Naval Service.

— Secretary of the Navy, signed March 9, 1944

The navy PT boat PT-59, captained by John F. Kennedy, helped evacuate Krulak's force from Choiseul at the end of the operation. In response, Krulak promised Kennedy a bottle of whiskey which he delivered almost 20 years later when Kennedy was serving as President of the United States.

After the war, Krulak returned to the United States and served as assistant director of the Senior School at Marine Corps Base Quantico, and, later, as regimental commander of the 5th Marines at Camp Pendleton.

=== Korean War ===
Krulak was serving as assistant chief of staff, G-3, Fleet Marine Force, Pacific, when the Korean War erupted, and subsequently served in Korea as chief of staff, 1st Marine Division, earning a second Legion of Merit with Combat "V" and Air Medal.

From 1951 to 1955, Krulak served at Headquarters Marine Corps as Secretary of the General Staff, then rejoined Fleet Marine Force, Pacific, as chief of staff.

=== 1956 to 1959 ===
In July 1956, he was promoted to brigadier general and designated assistant commander, 3rd Marine Division on Okinawa. From 1957 to 1959, he served as director, Marine Corps Educational Center, Quantico. He was promoted to major general in November 1959, and the following month assumed command of Marine Corps Recruit Depot San Diego.

=== Vietnam War ===
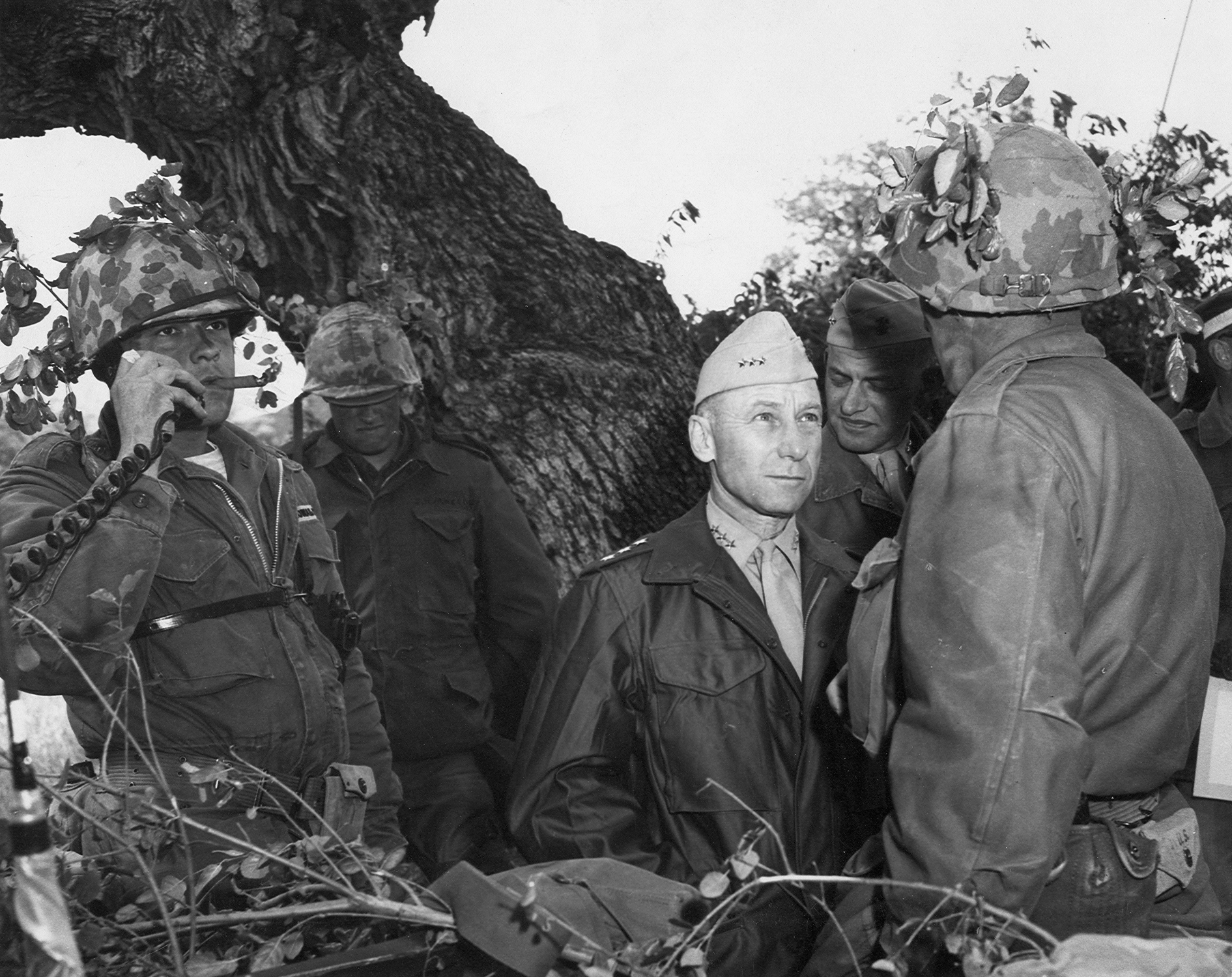
Lt. Gen Krulak in a training exercise at Camp Pendleton, May 7, 1964

From 1962 to 1964, Krulak served as special assistant for counter insurgency activities, Organization of the Joint Chiefs of Staff; for which he was presented a third Legion of Merit for meritorious service by General Maxwell D. Taylor, Chairman of the Joint Chiefs of Staff. During this period, American military advisors were providing assistance to the South Vietnamese in their war against the Viet Cong. In September 1963, then Major General Krulak and Joseph Mendenhall, a senior Foreign Service officer, led the Krulak–Mendenhall mission, a fact-finding mission to learn about the progress of the war. Krulak said that the situation was very good and supported President Ngo Dinh Diem, while Mendenhall claimed the opposite, leading Kennedy to famously ask the pair if they had visited the same country. In late December 1963, the new president, Lyndon B. Johnson, ordered an interdepartmental group to be headed by Krulak with the purpose of studying OPLAN 34A and selecting from it those targets the United States could hit in North Vietnam with the least amount of risk to its people. This was in keeping with the administration's policy of graduated pressure on the North Vietnamese.

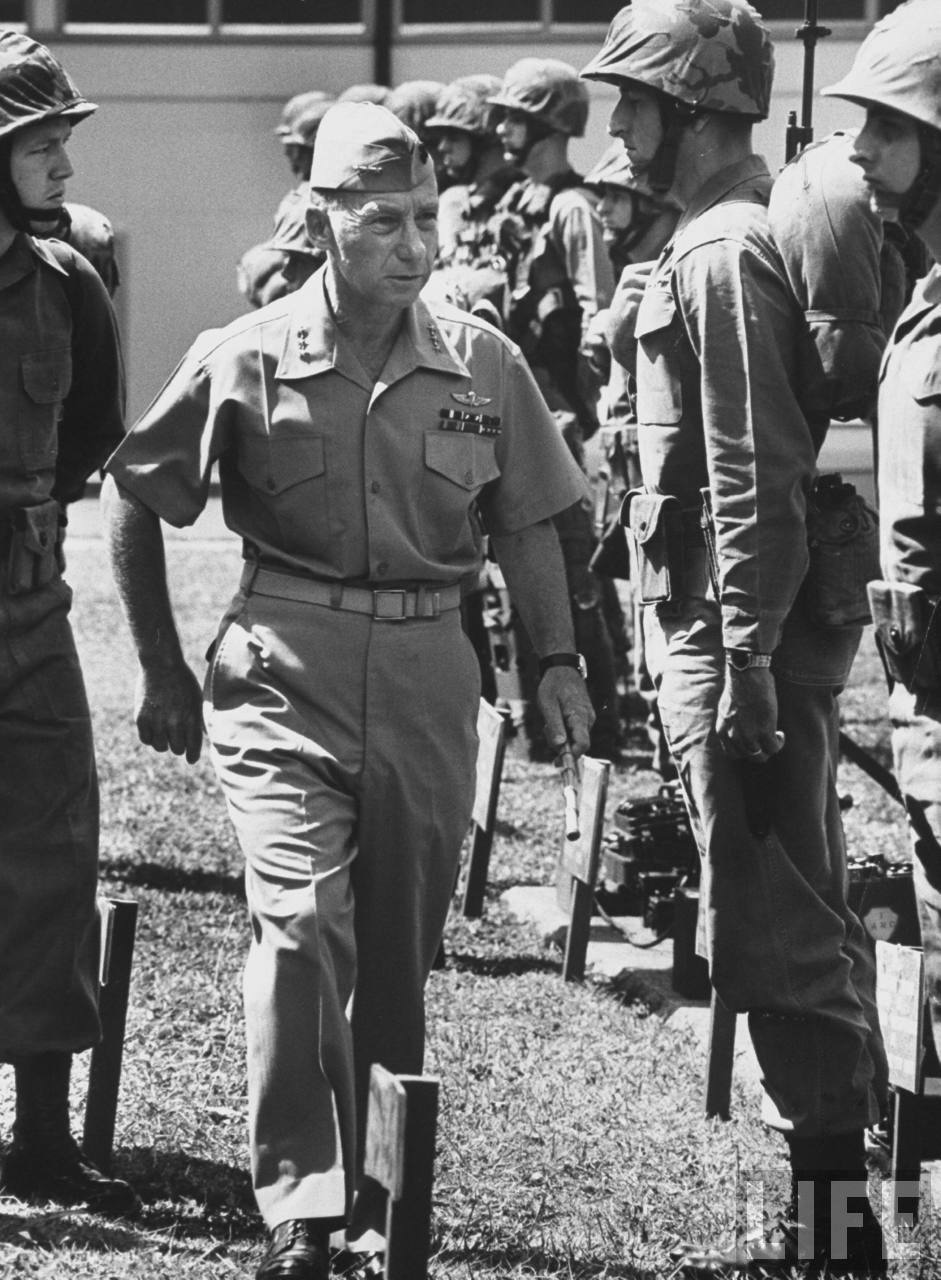
Krulak inspecting Marines from First Air Naval Gunfire Liaison Company in Hawaii, April 1965.

On March 1, 1964, Krulak became the Commanding General, Fleet Marine Force, Pacific, and promoted to lieutenant general. For the next four years, Krulak was responsible for all Fleet Marine Force units in the Pacific, including some 54 trips to the Vietnam theater. Many sources including Coram (2010) report that the Chu Lai base, which commenced in May 1965, was named after Krulak's own Chinese name. (Note: "Krulak named Chu Lai after himself, having been the General who first flew over the area and selected the site. There were no towns nearby, just a wide open area, so he called it Chu Lai, which means Krulak in Mandarin Chinese".)

At the beginning of the war, Krulak put forward the "Spreading Inkblot Theory." This promoted a spreading inkblot of small units actions to pacify South Vietnam village by village. When large enemy units were encountered, then General Westmoreland's overwhelming firepower should be employed. He also called for intensive bombing of North Vietnam and mining of Haiphong Harbor. Krulak's plans were eventually rejected as Westmoreland favored hammering the enemy into submission through superior firepower and the Johnson administration feared relentless bombing of the North would provoke Soviet and Chinese intervention. Krulak opposed the establishment of the Khe Sanh Combat Base.

Krulak hoped to become the next Commandant of the Marine Corps, but in 1967 Lyndon B. Johnson selected Leonard F. Chapman, Jr. As a result, Krulak retired on June 1, 1968, receiving a Navy Distinguished Service Medal for his performance during that period. His biographer Robert Coram states Krulak's comments to President Johnson criticizing the restraints placed on American military operations in Vietnam resulted in Johnson's selection of Chapman over Krulak. General Krulak's son Charles C. Krulak eventually became the 31st Commandant of the Marine Corps, serving from 1995 to 1999.

=== Medals and decorations ===
Krulak's medals and decorations include:

Badge	Navy/Marine Corps Parachutist Insignia			
1st row	Navy Cross		Navy Distinguished Service Medal	
2nd row	Legion of Merit w/ 2 award stars & valor device	Bronze Star Medal with "V" device	Purple Heart	Air Medal
3rd row	Navy Presidential Unit Citation w/ 3 service stars	China Service Medal w/ 1 service star	American Defense Service Medal w/ Base clasp	American Campaign Medal
4th row	Asiatic-Pacific Campaign Medal w/ 3 service stars	World War II Victory Medal	Navy Occupation Service Medal	National Defense Service Medal w/ 1 service star
5th row	Korean Service Medal w/ 4 service stars	Vietnam Service Medal w/ service star	Order of Service Merit, Second Class	National Order of Vietnam, Commander
6th row	Vietnam Gallantry Cross w/ palm	Korean Presidential Unit Citation	United Nations Korea Medal	Vietnam Campaign Medal
Badge	Rifle Expert Marksmanship Badge		Pistol Expert Marksmanship Badge	

=== Strategic vehicle advocacy ===
Krulak was an early advocate of using helicopters for infantry assault. He was also instrumental in the development of Higgins boats, which enabled beach landings of men and material in World War II.

== Personal life ==
After retiring from the Marine Corps, Krulak worked for Copley Newspapers, including serving as president of Copley News Service and vice president of Copley Press. He retired from Copley in 1977, though he continued to contribute to their news service.

Krulak also wrote a number of books, including the iconic Marine Corps history First to Fight.

Krulak was a personal friend of Ronald Reagan. They wrote each other regularly.

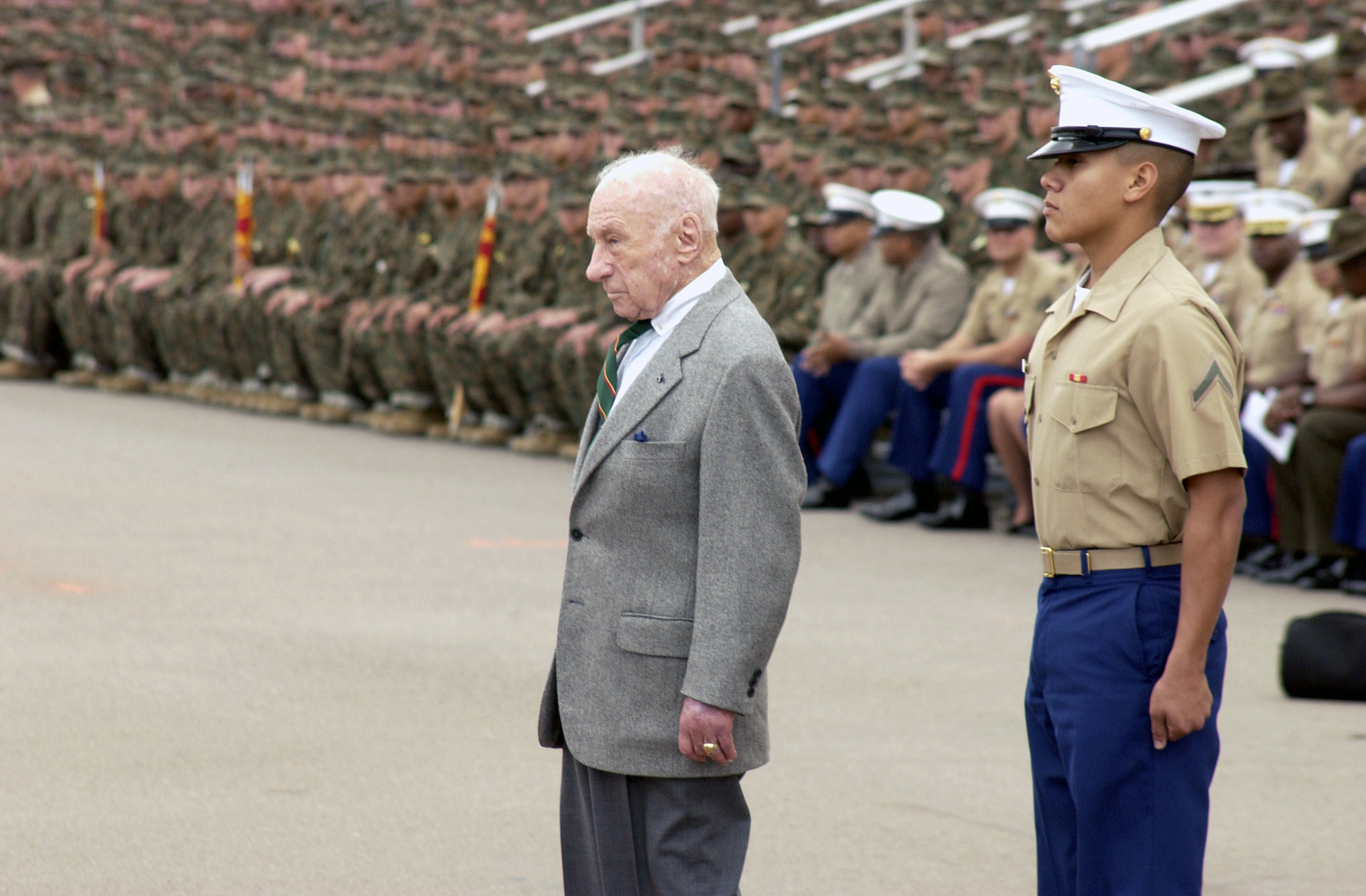
Krulak (age 91) at MCRD San Diego for the Marine Corps Birthday celebration; waiting for the passing of the cake ceremony, from the oldest to the youngest Marine. (2004)

In retirement, Krulak was active in community organizations, as well as participating in Marine Corps activities. He served as president and trustee of the Zoological Society of San Diego. His wife, Amy, died in 2004.

On December 29, 2008, Krulak died at age 95 in San Diego, California. He was survived by his three sons – retired Marine Corps Commandant General Charles Krulak, Reverend Victor Krulak (Commander Navy Chaplain Corps), Reverend William Krulak (Colonel USMCR) – four grandchildren, and 10 great-grandchildren. Krulak's funeral was held on January 8, 2009, in the chapel at MCAS Miramar, with burial at Fort Rosecrans National Cemetery.

== Honors ==
In 2004, Lieutenant General Krulak was the recipient of the U.S. Naval Academy's Distinguished Graduate award, which honors alumni who have "provided a lifetime of service to the nation or armed forces, have made significant and distinguished contributions to the nation via their public service and have demonstrated a strong interest in supporting the Navy or Marine Corps and the United States Naval Academy. These individuals are the embodiment of the Naval Academy's mission to provide graduates who will be ready '…to assume the highest responsibilities of command, citizenship and government.'"

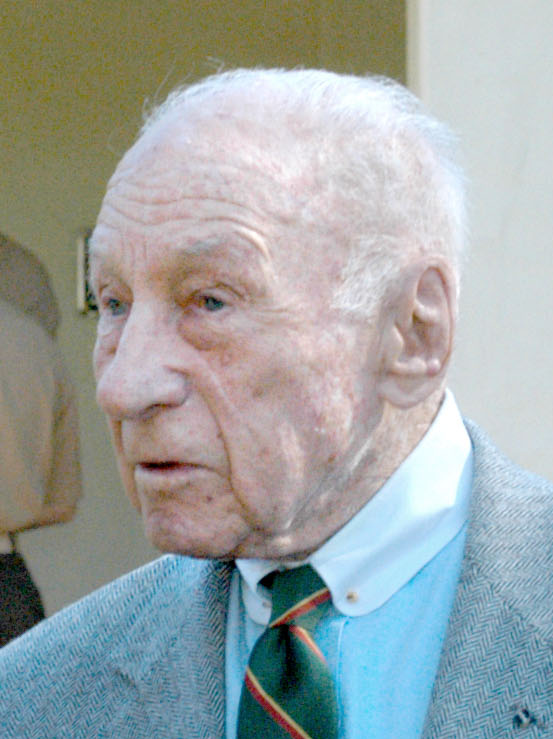
Retired Lt. General Victor Krulak on April 1, 2005

In 2007, at the Marine Corps Association's first annual banquet, Secretary of Defense Robert Gates recounted the story of Krulak's time in China and his career:

Krulak's was, of course, a legendary career: Navy Cross; counterinsurgency advisor to the Joint Staff; commander of the Fleet Marines in the Pacific during the Vietnam War; and, father of a future Marine Commandant, Chuck Krulak.... Victor Krulak's story and accomplishments teach us a good deal:

- About learning from the experiences and setbacks of the past;
- About being open to take ideas and inspiration from wherever they come; and
- About overcoming conventional wisdom and bureaucratic obstacles thrown in one's path.

His book First to Fight won the 1984 Samuel Eliot Morison Award for Naval Literature.

The Brute Krulak Center for Innovation and Creativity (BKCIC) at the Marine Corps University, a research support center that "serves as an incubator of academic innovation and mentation," is named after Victor Krulak.

== Published works ==
- First to Fight: View of the U.S. Marines. Simon & Schuster. 1991. ISBN 0-671-73012-6.
- Panama: An Assessment. U.S. Strategic Institute. 1990. ISBN 0-913187-03-8.
- Organization for National Security: A Study. U.S. Strategic Institute. 1983. ISBN 0-913187-00-3.

== See also ==
- Inkspot strategy - military strategy for subduing a large hostile region with a relatively small military force
- Andrew Higgins - boatbuilder, manufacturer of World War II Higgins boats
- United States Marine Corps Physical Fitness Test - physical fitness requirements of the USMC

== Endnotes ==
Military offices
Preceded by Carson A. Roberts	Commanding General of the Fleet Marine Force Pacific; 1964–1968	Succeeded by Henry W. Buse Jr.
Preceded by Bruno Hochmuth	Commanding General of the MCRD San Diego; 1959–1962	Succeeded by Sidney S. Wade
Preceded by Bankson T. Holcomb Jr.	Commanding Officer of the 5th Marine Regiment; 1949–1950	Succeeded by Raymond L. Murray
