= Piva River (Bougainville) =

River on Bougainville Island, Papua New Guinea

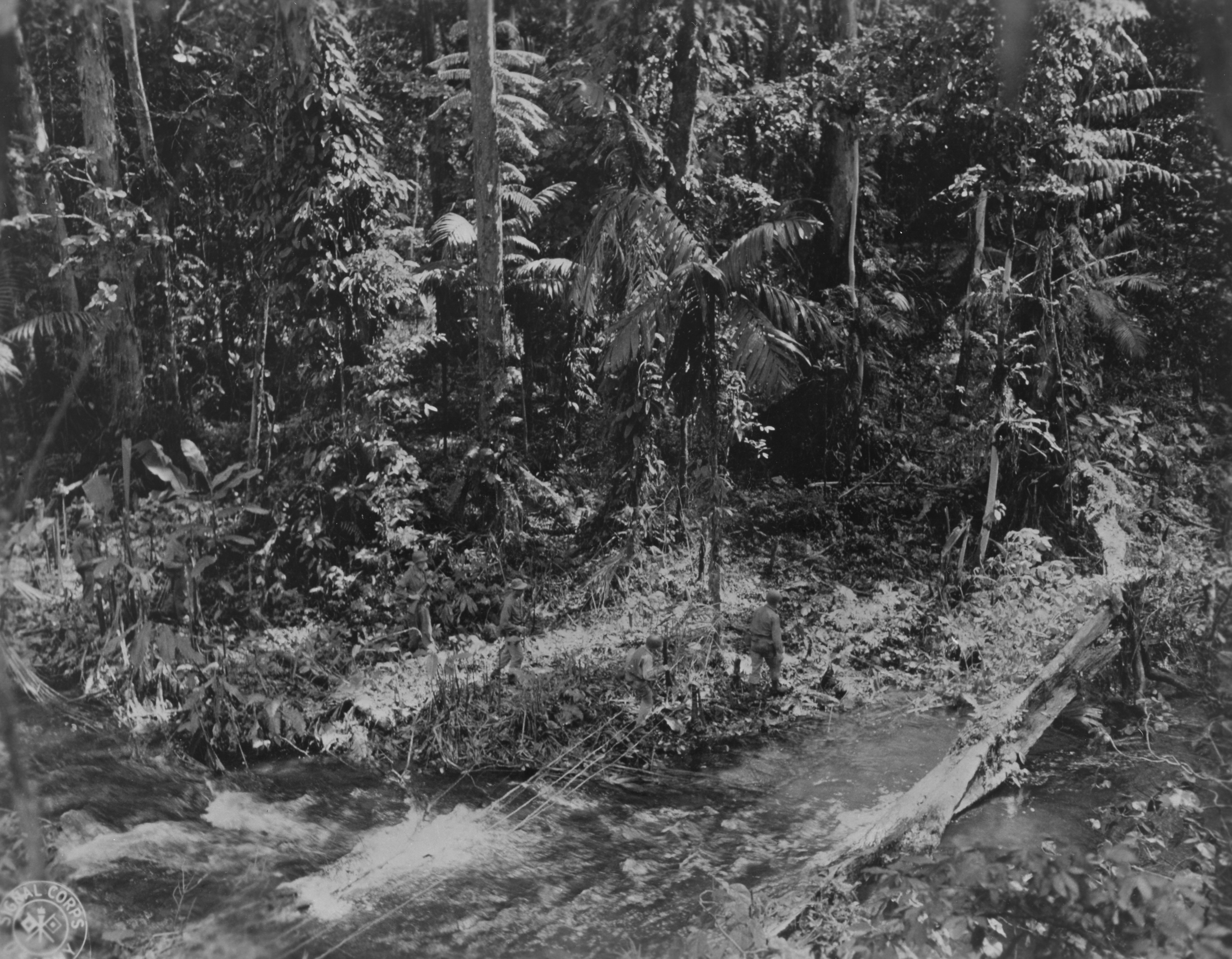
- A patrol of the 129th Infantry, 37th Division, crosses the Piva River on the way back to the front lines on Bougainville, Solomon Islands. 21 January, 1944.

Physical characteristics
- Mouth
  - coordinates: 6°15′S 155°04′E

The Piva River is a river on the south western coast of Bougainville. The Piva Trail ran alongside the river and the area was the scene of fighting during the Bougainville campaign of the Second World War. The Battle for Piva Trail took place between the 8th and 9th of November 1943 to secure control of the junction between the Piva and Numa Numa trails followed a few days later by the Battle of Piva Forks securing key territories around the beach head established during the Landings at Cape Torokina.
