= Raid on Koiari =

World War II Battle

Koiari Raid
- Part of the Bougainville campaign in the Pacific Theater (World War II)
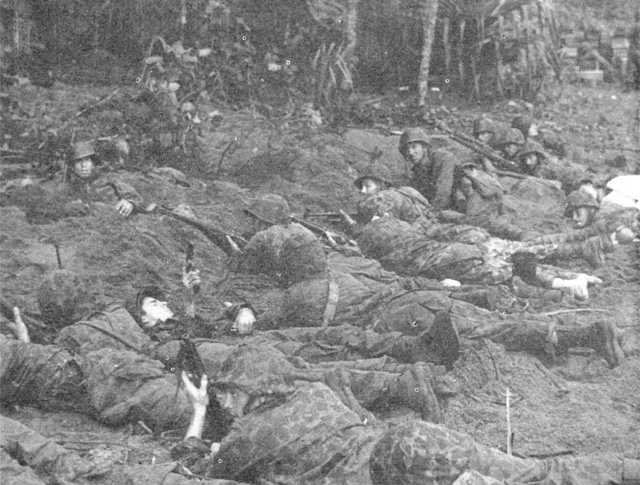
- Marines from the 1st Parachute Battalion on the beach at Koiari 29 November 1943
Date	28–29 November 1943
Location	Bougainville in the South Pacific
Result	Japanese victory

Belligerents
United States	(Empire of Japan) Japan

Commanders and leaders
(United States) Roy Geiger (United States) Richard Fagan	(Empire of Japan) Masatane Kanda (Empire of Japan) Shun Iwasa

Strength
614	Est. 1,200

Casualties and losses
15 dead 99 wounded 7 missing	Est. 145–291 killed

The Raid on Koiari was a battle that occurred between 28 and 29 November 1943 in the Pacific theater of World War II between American and Japanese forces. Part of the Bougainville campaign, the raid involved a landing by a battalion-sized force of United States Marines to harass Imperial Japanese Army troops on Bougainville Island. The raid was a failure for the Americans as they were attacked by a larger-than-expected Japanese force and as a result the Marines were withdrawn from the beachhead without having achieved any of their objectives.

== Background ==
On 1 November 1943, US forces had landed around Cape Torokina as part of the Allied advance north through the Solomon Islands towards the Japanese strong hold around Rabaul on New Britain, as part of Operation Cartwheel. After establishing a perimeter around the beachhead, the US commander, Major General Roy Geiger, decided to expand the perimeter to include a ridge of hills 2,000 yards (1,800 m) away and ordered an eastward advance towards the Torokina River, aimed at establishing a series of defense lines.

Following the Battle of Piva Forks, which had secured defense line "Easy", further plans were formulated. Soldiers from the 37th Infantry Division would advance to defense line "How", while the 3rd Marine Division was to secure inland defense line codenamed "Fox". The Marines' advance was to proceed on 26 November. In order to protect the general advance from any surprise Japanese attack on the right flank, and to cut off Japanese reinforcements, Geiger planned a raid at Koiari ("Napoi" in Japanese sources), 10 miles (16 km) down the coast from Cape Torokina, to detect enemy troop movements, destroy enemy supply dumps and disrupt their line of communications. The raiders were to harass enemy units as far inland as the East–West trail but avoid any decisive engagement with major Japanese forces.

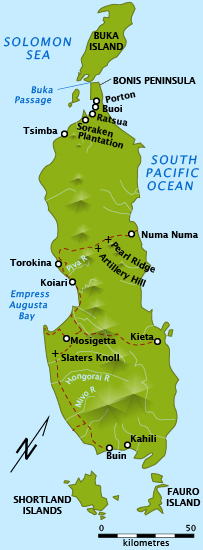
Location of Koiari on Bougainville

The 1st Parachute Battalion, 1st Marine Parachute Regiment, under the command of Major Richard Fagan, which had just arrived from Vella Lavella, was assigned to be the main force, with 'M' Company of the 3rd Marine Raider Battalion and a forward observer team from the 12th Marine Regiment attached. However, the raid was delayed until the 29 November. Covering fire for the landing, which had been planned to be provided by destroyers, was not available. A preliminary reconnaissance landing was undertaken in darkness on 27 November and reported no enemy activity in the area. A boat reconnoitered the beach landing site prior to the landing on 28 November and also reported no enemy activity.

The Japanese troops defending the area were from Lieutenant General Masatane Kanda's 6th Division, with the infantry forming a detachment known as the Iwasa Detachment under the command of Major General Shun Iwasa.

== Raid ==
The 1st Parachute Battalion was transported by United States Navy LCM and LCVP landing craft, landing ashore at Koiari at 04:00 on 29 November. The landing occurred adjacent to a Japanese supply dump. The Marines overran the supply dump and hastily dug in 200 yards (180 m) inland, amidst heavy mortar, machine gun and rifle fire from defending Japanese. Meanwhile, 'M' Company of the 3rd Marine Raider Battalion and HQ Company were landed 0.5 miles (0.80 km) further south. In order to repel the landing, troops from the Japanese 6th Transport Regiment and elements of the 23rd Infantry Regiment launched infantry charges which caused significant casualties amongst the US forces. Close-in support fire was provided by 155 mm guns of the 3rd Defense Battalion firing from their gun lines around Cape Torokina under the control of the forward observation teams. A captured 37 mm field gun was also used against the Japanese.

Experiencing heavier-than-expected resistance, it became clear to the US commanders that the raiders were outnumbered. With an estimated 1,200 Japanese in the immediate vicinity, the US raiding force faced annihilation. The second landing party that had been landed further south met up with the main party at 09:30, having suffered 13 casualties while moving north. Realizing the futility of the situation and believing that he no longer possessed freedom of action having been decisively engaged, Fagan sent a request over the radio for evacuation. Geiger concurred and ordered the Marines to be withdrawn, although a communications failure resulted in this message not getting through to Fagan.

Two attempts were made to extract them by landing craft, although these failed because of heavy Japanese artillery fire. With their backs to the sea and ammunition running low amongst the troops on the beach, an LCI gunboat and the destroyers USS Fullam (DD-474), USS Lansdowne (DD-486), and USS Lardner (DD-487), which had been ordered back from convoy escort duties, closed in to the beach at 18:00, and—in concert with shore based artillery and air support—provided a barrage that allowed rescue craft to remove the raiding group from the beach; the last boat left the area at 20:40 under the cover of darkness.

== Aftermath ==
None of the objectives of the raid were achieved, and the raid was a failure with 15 killed or died of wounds, 99 wounded and 7 missing. It was estimated that the Japanese had lost between 145 and 291 men. Again the lack of preliminary naval and artillery bombardment proved to be important in the outcome of the engagement. In the aftermath of the raid, US plans to expand the perimeter around Torokina went ahead with units of the 3rd Marine Division advancing towards the Torokina River throughout early December, as part of a plan to occupy the high ground west of the river. This advance would see the Marines take part in a series of engagements around Hellzapoppin Ridge and Hill 600A in mid-December.

In December, US Army troops from Major General Oscar Griswold's XIV Corps had arrived to relieve the Marines around the perimeter. After this, there were no major actions around the US perimeter until March 1944, when the Japanese launched a strong counterattack that was turned back with heavy casualties. Following the defeat of the Japanese counterattack, a lull period followed until late 1944 when Australian forces arrived to relieve the American troops who were transferred to the Philippines. The Australians subsequently undertook a series of advances across the island, which saw them clear the central sector and push north towards the Bonis Peninsula and south towards Buin.
