= Piva Trail =

The Piva Trail is a trail on Bougainville, part of the Solomons chain, that runs alongside the Piva River, connecting to the East West Trail and the Numa Numa Trail.

On 8–9 November 1943, as part of the Bougainville campaign during World War II, men of the U.S. Marine Corps and the Imperial Japanese Army fought the Battle for Piva Trail, ending with American control of the vital trail intersection.
