= Lake Tharthar raid =

2005 Iraqi commando raid

- Part of the Post-invasion Iraq
Date	March 23, 2005
Location	Lake Tharthar, Iraq
Result	U.S.-Iraqi victory

Belligerents
Iraq; United States	Secret Army of Islam; Ba'ath Party loyalists Al-Qaeda in Iraq; Other Iraqi insurgents

Strength
(Iraq) 15–20 commandos (United States) 10 troops	~120 insurgents

Casualties and losses
7 killed 6 wounded	84 killed (estimated); 1 captured (unconfirmed)

The Lake Tharthar raid was an Iraqi commando raid on a Secret Army of Islam training camp at Lake Tharthar on March 23, 2005.

== Background ==
The training camp, located in a remote region near Lake Tharthar, next to the Sunni Al Anbar and Salah ad Din provinces, was, according to Iraq officials, the largest guerrilla training camp discovered by that point in the war. The camp was shared by Ba’ath party loyalists and members of Al-Qaeda. The insurgents had planned to attack the city of Samarra, which was located some 55 kilometers (34 mi) east of the lake, with a large number of car bombs. A concurrent operation had pushed the insurgents outside of the city and forced them to camp in a swampy area next to the lake. The remote site contained ramshackle huts and tents, several cars, and boats used by insurgents to cross the lake. The camp was well camouflaged and defended by mortars and machine gun nests. There were an estimated 120 insurgents in the camp at the time of the raid.

== The raid ==
A battalion of Iraqi police commandos as well as 9 American Cavalry Scouts and 1 medic from 3rd Battalion 69th Armor Regiment and one local national interpreter were involved in the raid. The scout team was made up of a select group of soldiers from the battalion. Most were on their second combat tour and had seen extensive combat during the 2003 invasion of Iraq. They had been directed to assist the Iraqi forces as they conducted anti-insurgent operations. As the multi-national force approached the suspected insurgent camp, the Iraqi contingent split in two groups, one to the west, closer to the lakeshore and one to the east. The Americans followed the group to the west. While the group to the west moved south along the lakeshore and encountered little resistance, the group to the east came under intense fire. The commandos to the east dismounted their pickup trucks and attacked across an open field towards the camp. They immediately suffered heavy casualties from machine gun nests and indirect fire. Reacting to the heavy fire and pleas for help, the Americans detached themselves from the western element and rejoined the elements to the east. The Americans engaged the enemy with machine gun fire in order to allow the extraction of the commando wounded. With more than a dozen casualties, limited radio contact with other friendly forces, and his own vehicle shot out from under him, 1LT John Rowold made the decision to split his forces, sending half to establish radio contact and request air support while the other half maintained contact with the enemy. While 1LT Rowold and a handful of Iraqi commandos pressed the attack and attempted to draw fire from the wounded laying in the open field, medic Specialist Ray Michael Fuhrmann II, under constant fire himself, provided aid to the wounded, stopping only long enough to return fire with his sidearm or the rifles of the dead and wounded. After 45 minutes of intense combat the Americans were running low on ammunition when two OH-58D helicopters arrived at the battle, led by 1LT Michael Hultquist. 1LT Hultquist observed the enemy enveloping the battered and outnumbered American and Iraqi forces on the ground. With rocket and machine gun fire, the helicopters were able to break up the attack and force the insurgents to flee the area by boat. It was estimated that some 30 insurgents managed to escape during the fighting by boat across the lake bringing all killed or wounded insurgents with them.

== Aftermath ==
Seven Iraqi commandos were killed in the raid and six were wounded. The Iraqi MoI estimated 84 insurgents were killed and the commandos claimed to have captured one of Algerian nationality. US Forces present however, were not able to confirm that any enemies were captured. After entering the camp, U.S. forces found non-Iraqi passports, training publications, propaganda documents, weapons and ammunition. According to the papers found some of the insurgents were of Moroccan, Algerian, Sudanese, Saudi, Syrian and Egyptian nationalities. U.S. Army Combat Medic Ray Michael Fuhrmann II (killed in action on 18 August 2005 in Samarra, Iraq) was awarded the Silver Star for his actions during the attack. The lead OH-58D pilot, 1LT Michael Hultquist received the Distinguished Flying Cross.

After reviewing footage of the raid, a coalition spokesman said in reference to the number of Insurgents killed that "somewhere between 11 and 80 lies an accurate number...the insurgent forces who fled...were able to recover their casualties and take them with them."
