= Shun Iwasa =

- 岩佐 俊
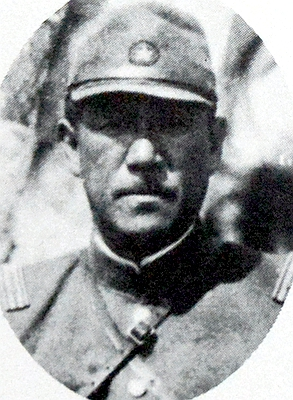
- Born: October 16, 1888; Fukuoka prefecture, Japan
- Died: July 12, 1969 (aged 80)
- Education: Imperial Japanese Army Academy
- Military career
- Allegiance: Empire of Japan
- Branch: Imperial Japanese Army
- Service years: 1910–1945
- Rank: Major General
- Units: IJA 9th Division; Japanese Eighth Area Army
- Commands: IJA 61st Infantry Regiment; IJA 3rd Independent Garrison Unit; IJA 65th Infantry Brigade; IJA 6th Infantry Brigade
- Conflicts: Second Sino-Japanese War; World War II; Bougainville campaign; Koiari Raid

Shun Iwasa (岩佐俊, Iwasa Shun; October 16, 1888 – July 12, 1969) was a general in the Imperial Japanese Army, commanding Japanese ground forces on Bougainville of 1945 in the closing months of the war.

== Biography ==
Iwasa was born in Fukuoka prefecture. He graduated from the 22nd class of the Imperial Japanese Army Academy in May 1910. He was promoted to colonel in June 1937.

During the Second Sino-Japanese War, Iwasa was commander of the IJA 61st Infantry Regiment from July 1938. This regiment was a garrison force based at Liaoyang and Jiamusi in Manchukuo until June 1940, when it was transferred to Hubei in central China. In August 1940, Iwasa was promoted to major general and assigned to the staff of the IJA 9th Division, back in Machukuo.

In April 1942, Iwasa was appointed commander of the IJA 3rd Independent Garrison Unit, but from December 1942, he was reassigned to the staff of the Japanese Eighth Area Army in the Japanese-occupied Solomon Islands and New Guinea. It had its headquarters at Rabaul, New Britain. In June 1943, Iwasa was appointed commander of the IJA 65th Infantry Brigade, responsible for the defenses of Rabaul. However, only a month later, he was transferred to command the IJA 6th Infantry Brigade on Bougainville. During the Bougainville campaign, Iwasa successfully opposed the landings of the United States Marine Corps during the Koiari Raid.
