= Raid (military) =

Type of military tactics and operational warfare

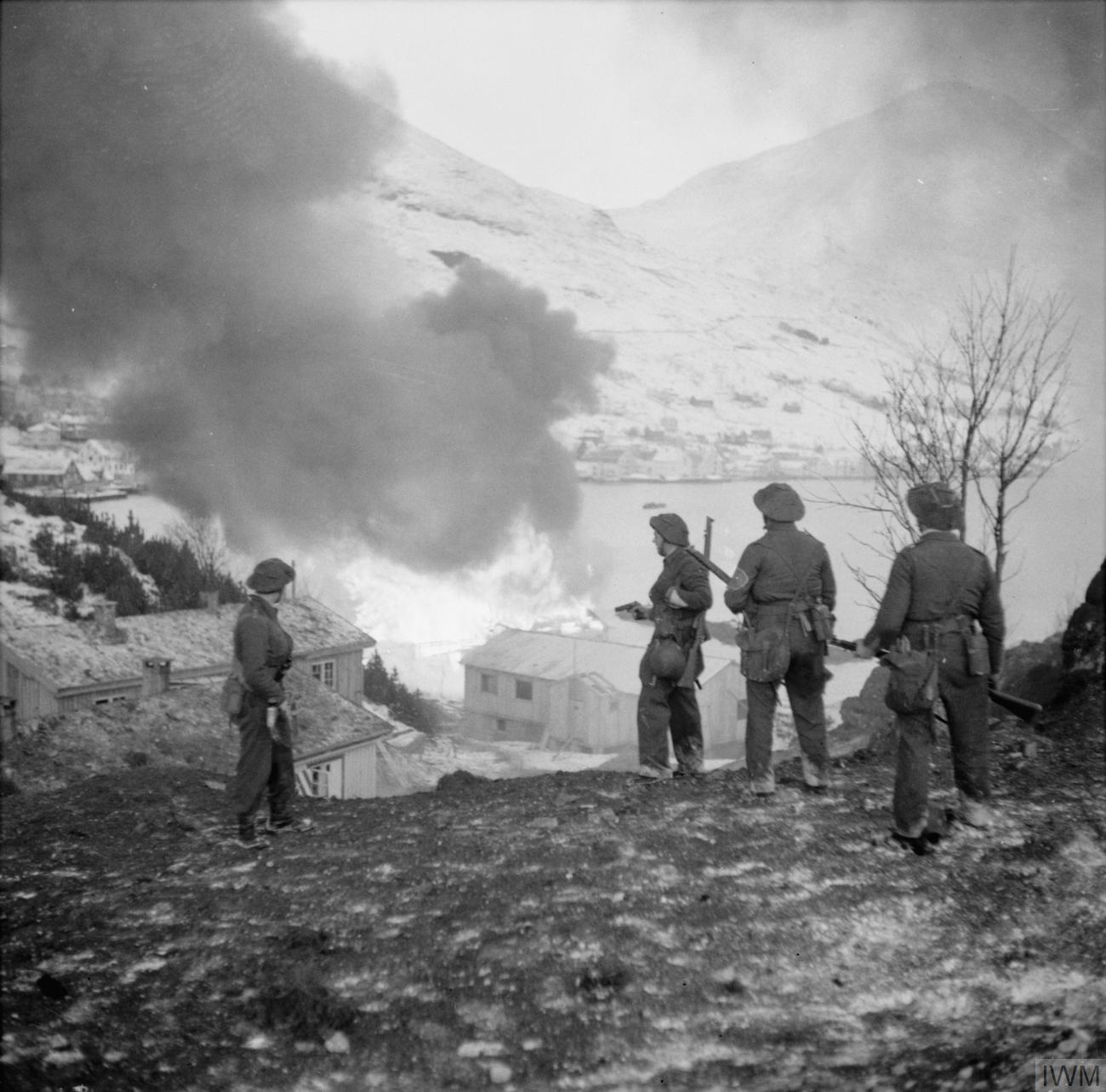
- British commandos watch as an ammunition dump burns during Operation Archery, Vågsøy 27 December 1941.
- Battlespace: Land; Air; Sea
- Strategy: Operational

Raiding, also known as depredation, is a military tactic or operational warfare "smash and grab" mission which has a specific purpose. Raiders do not capture and hold a location, but quickly retreat to a previous defended position before enemy forces can respond in a coordinated manner or formulate a counter-attack. Raiders must travel swiftly and are generally too lightly equipped and supported to be able to hold ground. A raiding group may consist of combatants specially trained in this tactic, such as commandos, or as a special mission assigned to any regular troops. Raids are often a standard tactic in irregular warfare, employed by warriors, guerrilla fighters or other irregular military forces. Some raids are large, for example the Sullivan Expedition.

The purposes of a raid may include:

- to demoralize, confuse, or exhaust the enemy;
- to destroy specific goods or installations of military or economic value;
- to free POWs
- to capture enemy soldiers for interrogation;
- to kill or capture specific key persons;
- to gather intelligence.

== Land ==
=== Arabia during Muhammad's era ===
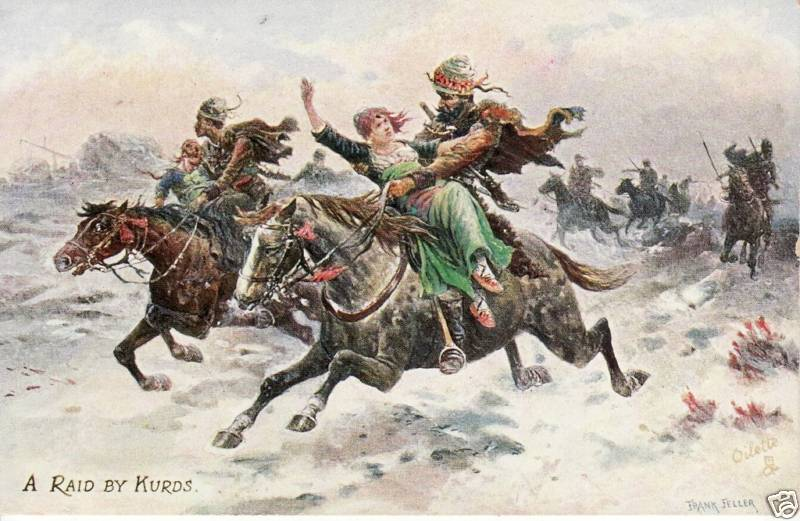
Raid by Kurdish tribal warriors in the 19th century

The Islamic prophet Muhammad made frequent use of raiding tactics. His first use of raids was during the caravan raids, and his first successful raid was the Nakhla raid. In January 624 Muhammad ordered this raid to attack a Quraysh caravan and gather information. During the Invasion of Thi Amr he ordered a raid on the Banu Muharib and Banu Talabah tribes after he received intelligence that they were allegedly going to raid the outskirts of Medina. One person was captured by Muslims during this raid.

In August 627 he ordered the First Raid on Banu Thalabah, a tribe already aware of the impending attack. So they lay in wait for the Muslims, and when Muhammad ibn Maslamah arrived at the site, 100 men of the Banu Thalabah ambushed them, while the Muslims were making preparation to sleep, and after a brief resistance killed all of Muhammad ibn Maslamah's men. Muhammad ibn Maslamah pretended to be dead. A Muslim who happened to pass that way found him and assisted him to return to Medina. The raid was unsuccessful.

=== Medieval Europe ===
Small scale raiding warfare was common in Western European warfare of the Middle Ages. Much of a professional soldiers' time could be spent in "little war", carrying out raids or defending against them. Typical of this style of warfare was the mounted raid or chevauchée, popular during the Hundred Years War. Chevauchées varied in size from a few hundred men to armies of thousands, and could range in scope from attacks on nearby enemy areas to the devastation of whole regions, such as that carried out by the Black Prince in Southern France in 1355. This last is notable not just for its success and scope but the fact that the raiders deliberately captured records in order to carry out a post-operational analysis of the impact of the raid on the enemy economy.

=== Large scale raiding ===
The traditional habit of Bedouin tribes of raiding other tribes, caravans, or settlements is known in Arabic as ghazzu. Wahhabi raids into Iraq in the early 19th century targeted the holy Shia cities of Najaf and Karbala, with the most infamous being the 1802 sack of Karbala. The Ikhwan raids on Transjordan were a series of attacks by the Ikhwan, irregular Arab tribesmen of Najd, on the British-protected Emirate of Transjordan in the 1920s.

The Comanche Wars began in 1706 with raids by Comanche warriors on the Spanish colonies of New Spain and continued until the last bands of Comanche surrendered to the United States Army in 1875. Comanche power peaked in the 1840s when they conducted large-scale raids hundreds of miles into Mexico proper, while also warring against the settlers in Texas. Comanche raids into Mexico usually started in Big Spring, Texas and penetrated by several routes deep into Mexico, as far as the state of Querétaro, located 1,400 kilometres (870 mi) south of Big Spring.

It is documented that large war parties of the Bororo, Kayapo, Munduruku, Guaraní, and Tupi people carried out long-distance raids across the interior of Brazil.

In 1872, the Mapuche leader Calfucurá and his 6,000 warriors attacked several cities in Argentina. These events were a catalyst for the government to mount the Conquest of the Desert.

In the operational level of war, raids were the precursors in the development of the Operational Manoeuvre Groups in the Soviet Army as early as the 1930s.

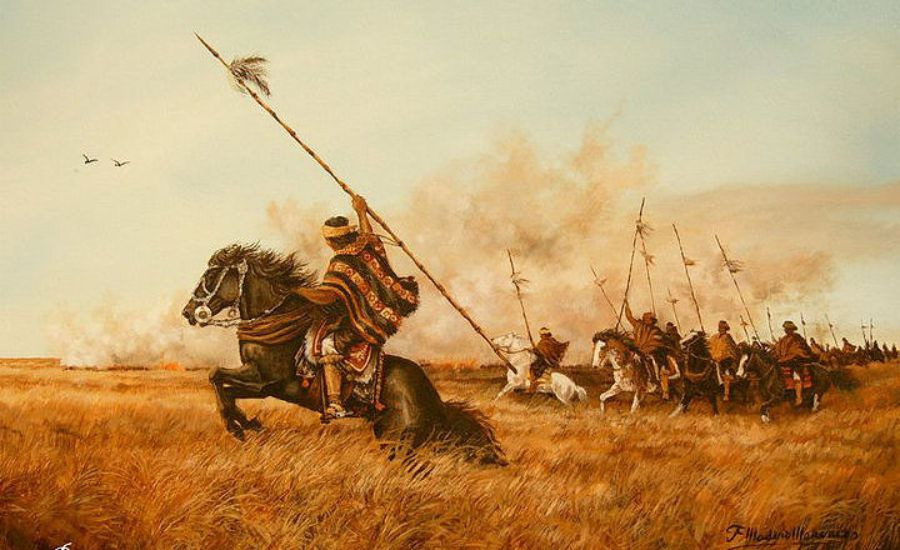
Mapuche raid led by Calfucurá

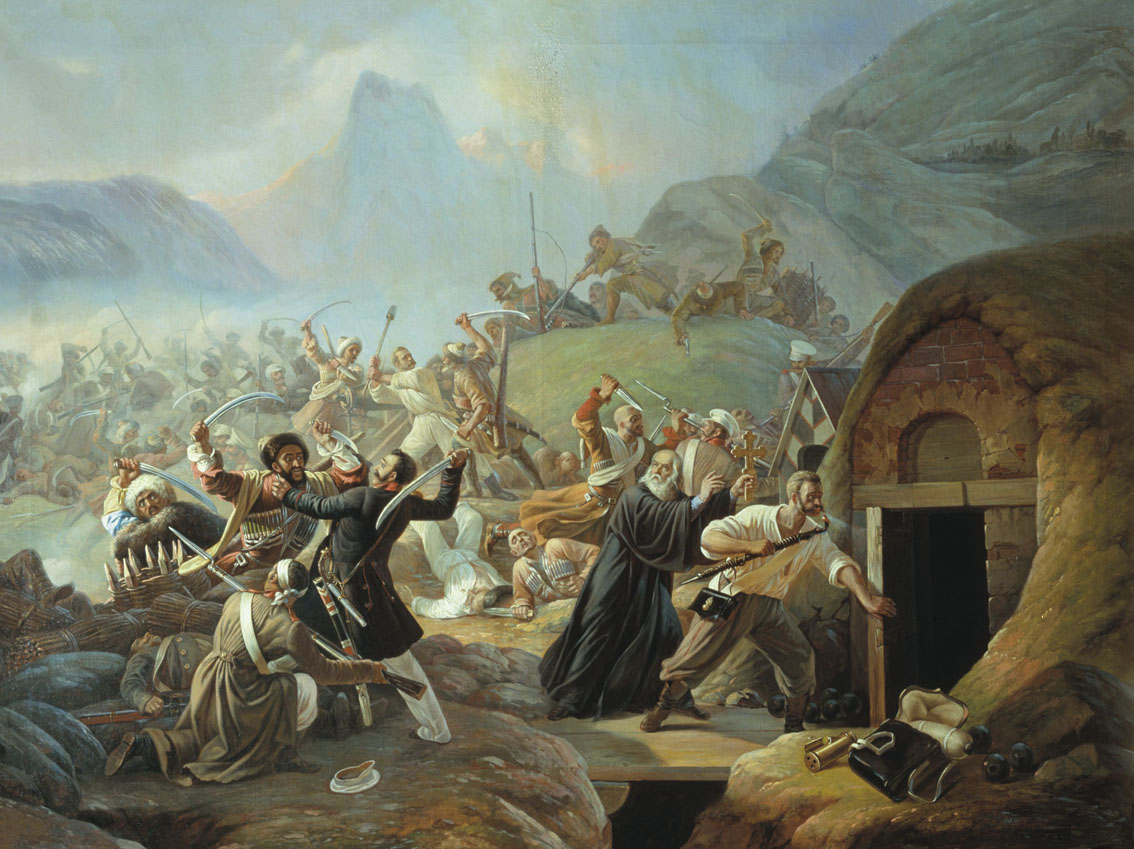
Circassian strike on a Russian military fort in the Caucasus, 1840

== Seaborne ==
Raiding by sea was known at the time of the Pharaohs, when the shipborne forces of the Sea Peoples caused serious disruption to the economies of the eastern Mediterranean.

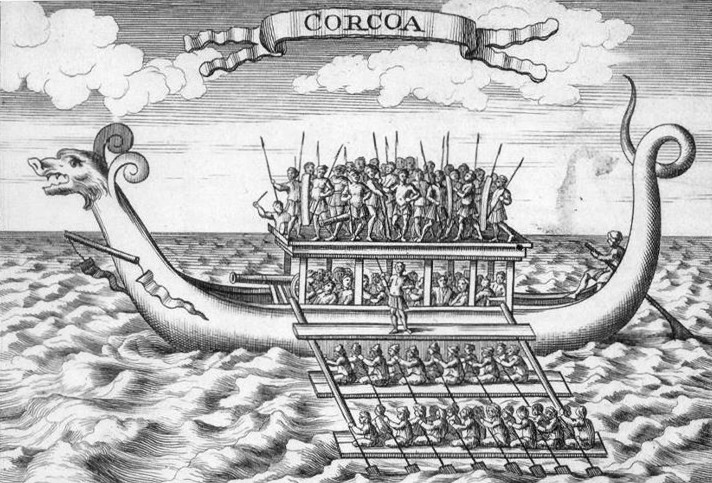
A karakoa, a large pre-colonial Visayan warship used for seaborne raids in the Philippines (c. 1711)

In pre-colonial thalassocracies in the islands of the Philippines, sea raids (mangayaw) and land wars (mangubat), were regular seasonal activities by warring polities, particularly among the Visayans. Participating in or defending against these raids were part of the duties of the noble (maginoo) and warrior castes (like the timawa and maharlika). The main purpose of the raids were to gain prestige in combat, to pillage, and to capture hostages. Participation and prowess in these raids were recorded in the widespread practice of full-body tattooing (batok). Raids were usually seaborne, and coastal communities had sentinels that watch for possible raids. When spotted, it was preferable for the defenders to meet the attackers at sea in ship-to-ship combat (bangga) rather than engage them on land. The raids had strict codes of conduct on the treatment of captives. People who surrendered were spared, to be ransomed or to work under temporary indentured servitude as alipin then set free. Anyone who kills a captive is required to pay their value, or risk becoming an alipin themselves. Higher-ranked captives were treated well and were usually ransomed by relatives.

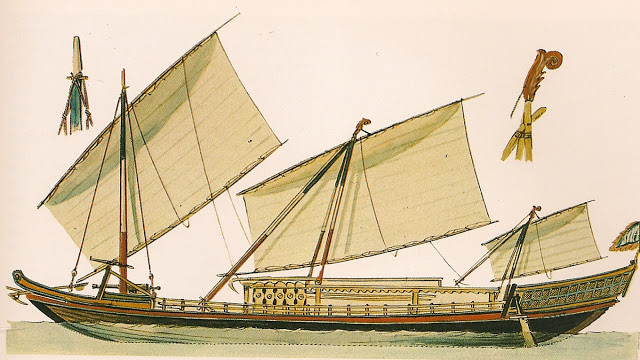
A lanong, an Iranun warship used for piracy and raids in the Sulu Sea, mainly for slaves (c. 1890)

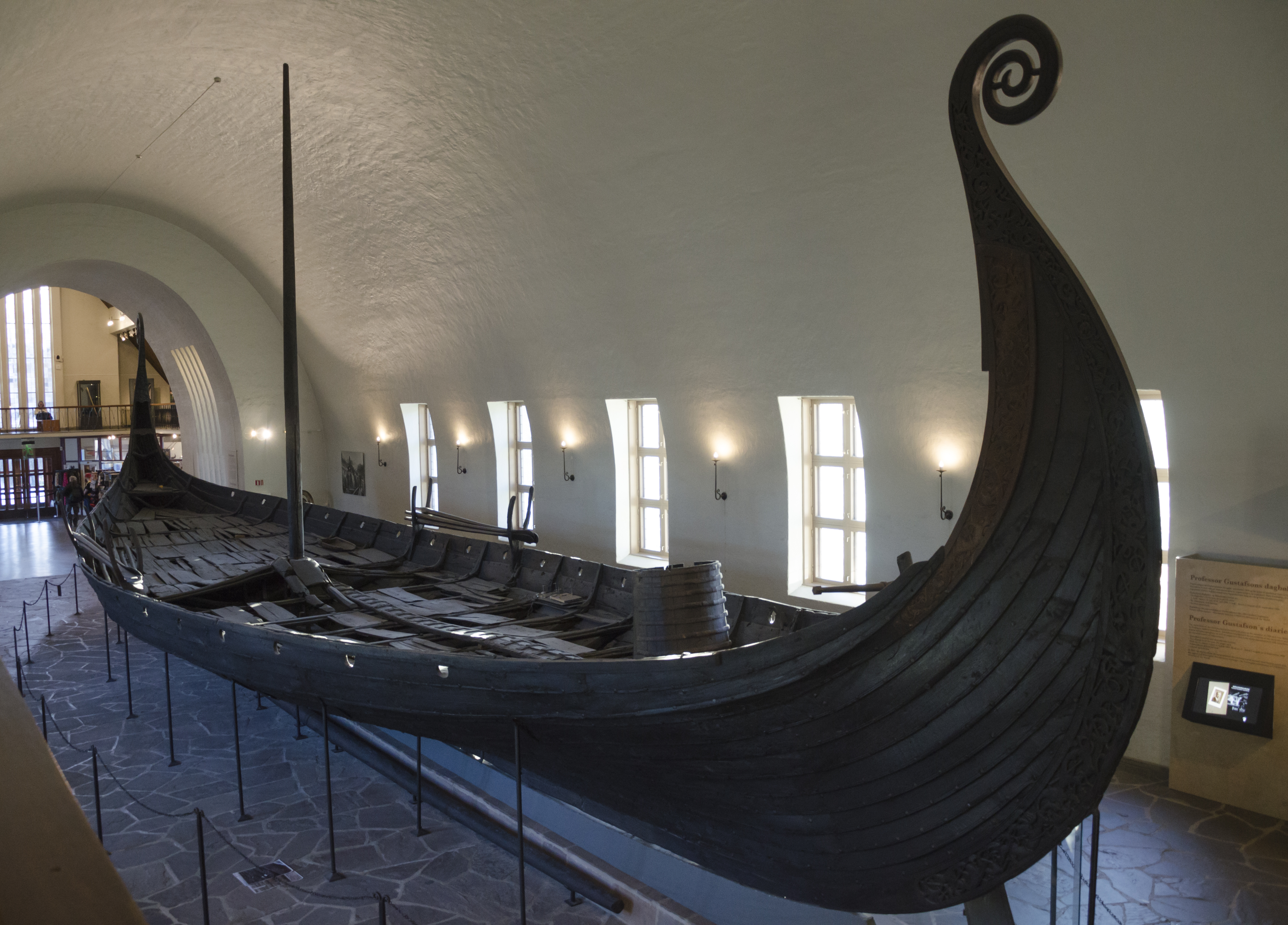
The Oseberg Ship, a Viking karve longship

In the early Middle Ages, Viking raiders from Scandinavia attacked the British Isles, France and Spain, attacking coastal and riverside targets. Much Viking raiding was carried out as a private initiative with a few ships, usually to gain loot, but much larger fleets were also involved, often as intent on extorting protection money (English: Danegeld) as looting and pillaging. Raiding did not cease with the decline of the Viking threat in the 11th century. It remained a common element of the medieval naval warfare. Extensive naval raiding was carried out by all sides during the Hundred Years War, often involving privateers such as John Hawley of Dartmouth or the Castilian Pero Niño. In the Mediterranean, raiding using oared galleys was common throughout the Middle Ages and into the Renaissance and was particularly a feature of the wars between the Christian powers and the Ottoman Empire in the 16th century. Raiding formed a major component of English naval strategy in the Elizabethan era, with attacks on the Spanish possessions in the New World. A major raid on Cádiz to destroy shipping being assembled for the Spanish Armada was carried out by Sir Francis Drake in 1587. Similarly the Dutch executed the Raid on the Medway during the Second Anglo-Dutch War and the Dutch Raid on North America during the Third Anglo-Dutch War.

During the Second World War, the British set up the Combined Operations Headquarters to organise harassing raids against the Germans in Europe. The first operation conducted by a "commando" formation, known as Operation Ambassador, took place in July 1940, but it was a small-scale operation that resulted in negligible success. The next major raid was Operation Claymore, which was launched in March 1941 against the Lofoten Islands. Throughout the war there were many other operations of varied size, ranging from small scale operations like those undertaken by Z Special Unit against the Japanese in the Pacific, such as Project Opossum, to Operation Chariot – a raid on Saint-Nazaire – and the Dieppe Raid, which was a large scale raid employing about 6,000 soldiers, over 200 ships and 74 squadrons of aircraft intended to take and hold Dieppe sufficiently to cause sufficient destruction to the port.

== Air ==
=== Air landed ===
Paratroopers and glider-borne troops have been landed by aircraft on raids, including offensive counter-air missions such as those carried out by the Teishin Shudan and Giretsu Kuteitai commandos. In the modern era, the helicopter, allowing for both insertion and extraction, offers a superior method of raid transportation, although it comes at the cost of noise. During the Second World War, several air-landed raids were undertaken, including the German glider-borne raid on Fort Eben-Emal in Belgium in 1940, and the British Operation Colossus and Operation Biting, which were raids in Italy and France in 1941 and 1942.

=== Aerial bombardment ===
The Royal Air Force first used the term "raid" in the Second World War when referring to an air attack. It included those by one aircraft or many squadrons, against all manner of targets on the ground and the targets defending aircraft. "Raid" was different from "battle", which was used for land, sea, or amphibious conflict. An aircraft "raid" was always planned ahead of time. Aircraft patrols (against U-boats) and defensive launches of carrier aircraft (against recently detected enemy ships) are differentiated from raids.

== See also ==
- Marine Raiders
- Chevauchée
- Direct action (military)
- Hit-and-run tactics
- Infiltration tactics
- Slave raiding
- Trench raiding
- Bride kidnapping
- Tribal warfare
- List of expeditions of Muhammad
- List of raids

== Sources ==
- Black, Robert W. (2004). Cavalry Raids of the Civil War. Mechanicsburg, Pennsylvania: Stackpole Books.
- Chappell, Mike (1996). Army Commandos 1940–45. Elite Series # 64. London: Osprey Publishing. ISBN 1-85532-579-9.
- Crowley, Roger (2008). Empires of the Sea. London: Faber & Faber. ISBN 978-0-571-23231-4.
- Evans, Martin (2000). The Fall of France: Act With Daring. Botley, Oxford: Osprey Publishing. ISBN 1-85532-969-7.
- Gat, Azar (2006). War in Human Civilization. Oxford: Oxford University Press.
- Griffith, Paddy (1995). The Viking Art of War. London: Greenhill Books. ISBN 1-85367-208-4.
- Hanson, Neil (2003). The Confident Hope of a Miracle. London: Corgi. ISBN 0-552-14975-6.
- Longmate, Norman (1990). Defending the Island. London: Grafton. ISBN 0-586-20845-3.
- Rogers, Clifford (2000). War Cruel and Sharp. Woodbridge: Boydell Press. ISBN 0-85115-804-8.
- Rogers, Clifford (2007). Soldiers Lives Through History: The Middle Ages. Westport, Connecticut: Greenwood Press. ISBN 978-0-313-33350-7.
- Simpkin, Richard; Erickson, John (1987). Deep Battle: The Brainchild of Marshal Tukhachevskii. London: Brassey's Defence Publishers.
- Smith, Kevin (2012). "Operation Opossum: The Raiding Party to Rescue the Sultan of Ternate, 1945". Sabretache. 53 (4, Dec): 48–54. ISSN 0048-8933.
- Thompson, Leroy (1989). British Paratroops in Action. Combat Troops Number 9. Carrollton, Texas: Squadron/Signal Publications. ISBN 0-89747-233-0.
