= Raid on Choiseul =

World War II US Marines action in the Solomon Islands campaign

- Part of the Pacific Theater of World War II
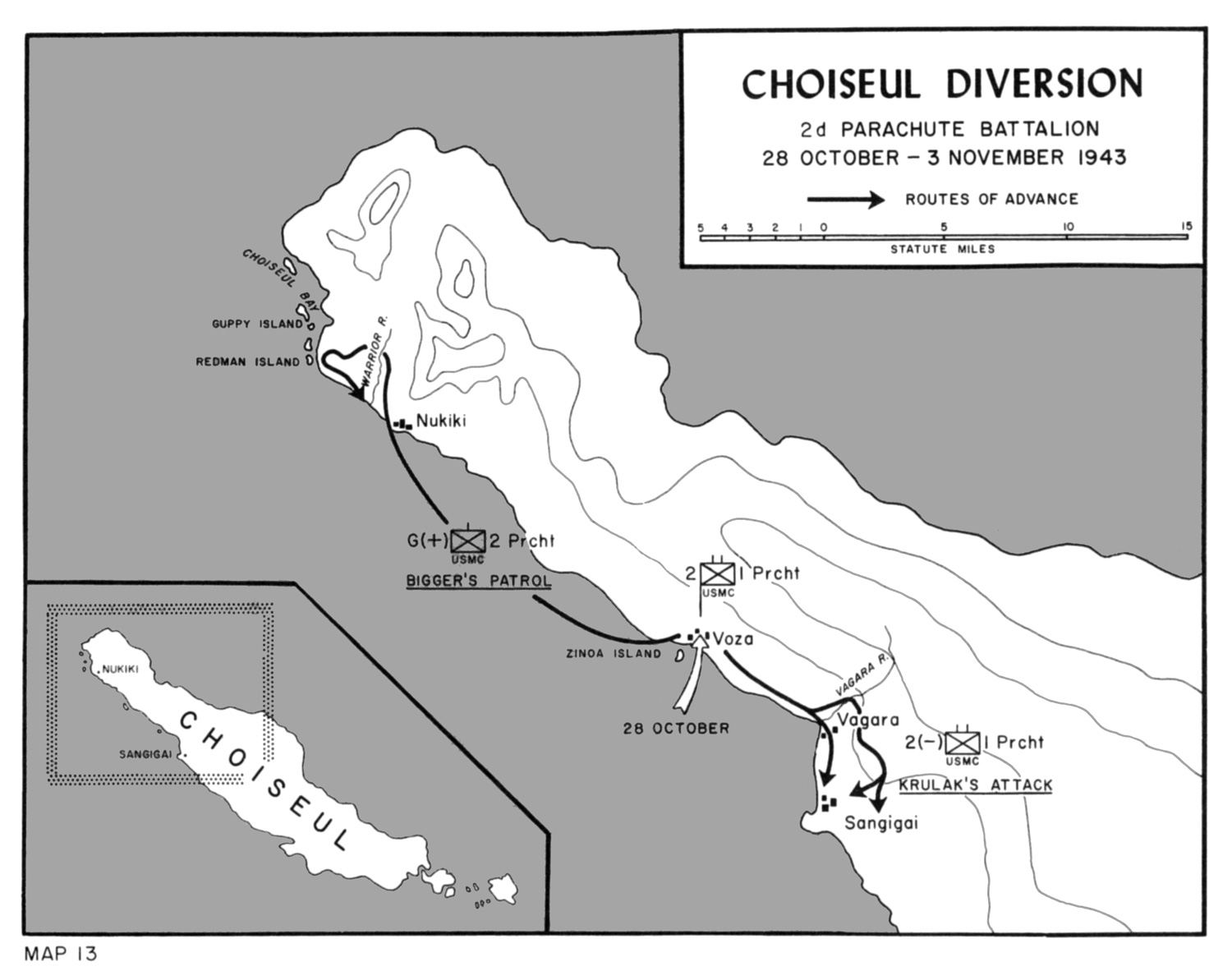
- A map of the raid on Choiseul
Date	October 28 – November 3, 1943
Location	6°53′S 156°37′E Choiseul in the Solomon Islands
Result	Indecisive

Belligerents
United States; Australia	Japan

Commanders and leaders
(United States) Victor H. Krulak	(Empire of Japan) Minoru Sasaki

Strength
656–725	3,000–7,000

Casualties and losses
11–13 killed, 15 wounded	143 killed, two barges sunk

The Raid on Choiseul (Operation Blissful) was a small unit engagement that occurred from 28 October to 3 November 1943, during the Solomon Islands campaign of the Pacific War. The raid was launched to divert the Japanese from the Allied landings at Cape Torokina on Bougainville Island.

United States Marines from the 2nd Parachute Battalion landed on Japanese-occupied Choiseul in the northern Solomon Islands and carried out raids on Japanese army and navy forces over a 25-mile (40 km) area over the course of seven days with the assistance of local Choiseul islanders and an Australian coastwatchers. The force was withdrawn back to Vella Lavella by landing craft following the successful lodgment of US troops on Bougainville.

== Background ==
Choiseul Island is located about 45 miles (72 km) southeast of Bougainville Island and northwest of Santa Isabel. Approximately 75 miles (121 km) in length, the island varies in width, up to 25 miles (40 km) at its broadest point. At the time of the battle the island's local population consisted of around 5,000 Melanesians, who were located mainly along the coast. Prior to the war the island had been administered by the Australian government, and in the early part of the war, the island had been captured by the Japanese. Local support largely favored the Allies, and two coastwatchers—Charles J. Waddell and Sub-Lieutenant Carden Seton—had operated on the island to gather information about Japanese shipping and troop movements in support of the Guadalcanal campaign.

Following the conclusion of the fighting on Guadalcanal and the Allied capture of the New Georgia islands, the Allies began preparations to advance north towards Bougainville. To support this, a series of diversionary actions were planned in the Treasury Islands and on Choiseul.

Allied staff from Lieutenant General Alexander Vandegrift's I Marine Amphibious Corps had initially considered Choiseul for their main attack in the northern Solomons, but eventually this had shifted towards the west coast of Bougainville. After this, operations on Choiseul were recast to divert Japanese attention from the planned landings at Cape Torokina, inside Empress Augusta Bay. The Allies hoped that the raid would cause the Japanese to believe the landings would be on the east side of Bougainville.

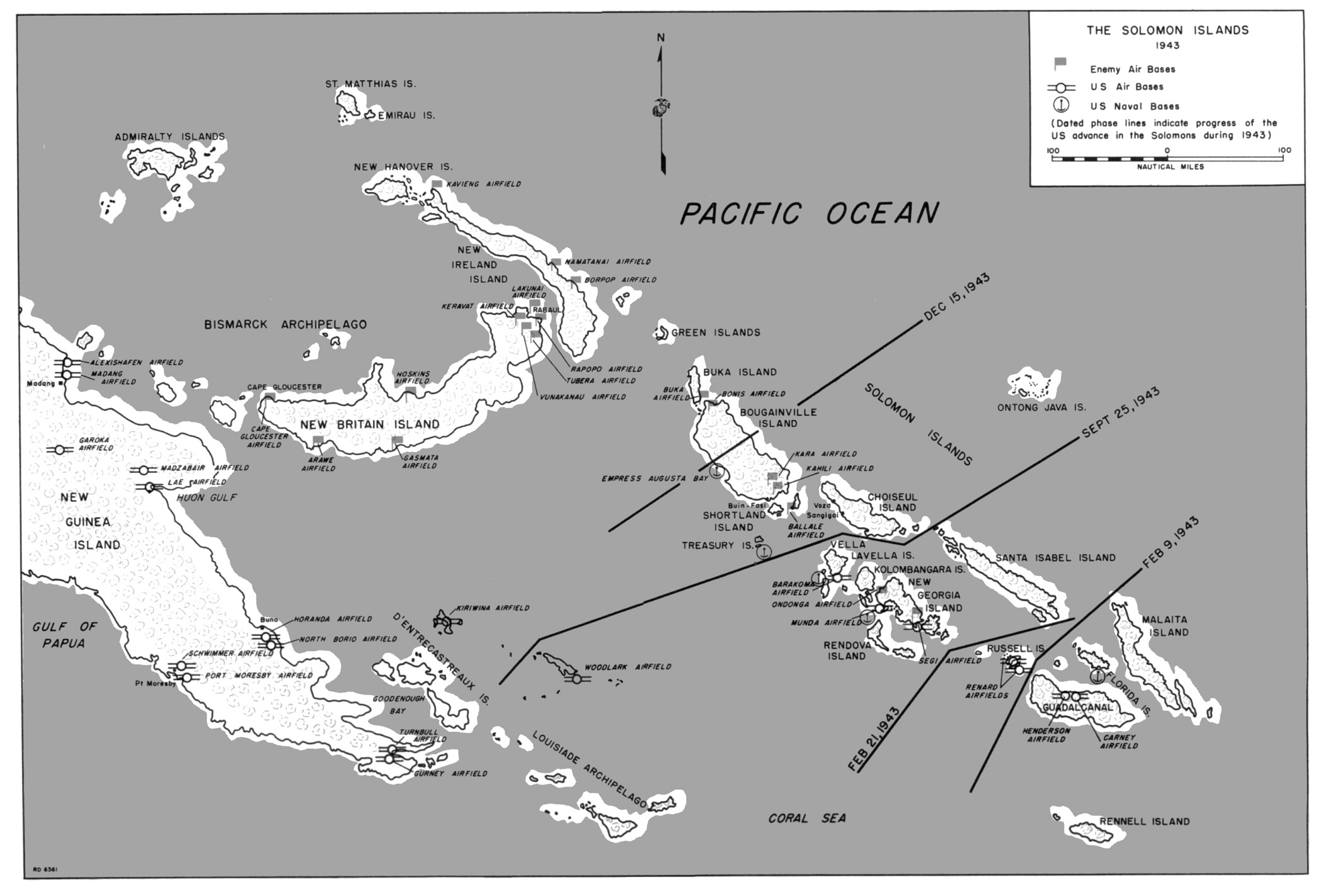
Choiseul within the Solomon Islands campaign

During September 1943, several reconnaissance patrols were sent to Choiseul by the Allies including New Zealanders and US Marines and US Navy personnel. These patrols operated over several days in the southwestern part of the island and in the north to gather intelligence on Japanese dispositions, force concentrations, and patrol activity. They also contacted coastwatchers on the island and sought to locate suitable sites for airfields and beaches capable of supporting landing operations. Reconnaissance confirmed that the terrain was unsuited to dropping troops by air and that instead an amphibious operation was necessary. Coral reefs prevented landing in most locations, with Voza, an abandoned village south of Choiseul Bay and north of Vagara, judged the most suitable. In many areas the beaches were narrow, giving way to thick jungle that was considered impenetrable, while in other locations the coast consisted of cliffs exposed to the sea. Thick jungle and rugged mountainous terrain dominated the interior of the island and made movement across the island difficult; as a result Allied planners chose to limit the size of the raiding force to a single battalion.

Throughout early October, information from Seton confirmed that the Japanese were using Choiseul as a staging base for troops withdrawing from the central Solomons and New Georgia towards Bougainville, estimating that there were around 3,000 Japanese troops in several dispersed locations between Choiseul Bay and Sangigai. They were reported to be demoralized and short on rations. On October 22, Allied planning staff confirmed the operation, assigning it the designation of Operation Blissful; tactical commanders were summoned to Guadalcanal for initial briefing and then returned to Vella Levalla by air to commence planning the raid.

== Raid ==
The raid involved 656–725 men from the US 2nd Parachute Battalion, led by Lieutenant Colonel Victor Krulak. On 27 October at Vella Levalla, the attacking force embarked on eight LCM landing craft before being transferred to four high speed transports—McKean, Crosby, Kilty, and Ward—that had just been released from supporting the landing of New Zealand troops on the Treasury Islands. Japanese troops on the island numbered between 3,000 and 7,000 and were under the command of Major General Minoru Sasaki. The majority of these troops were based around Kakasa and around Choiseul Bay where a small harbor was maintained for several barges. Escorted by the destroyer USS Conway, the convoy carrying the US raiding party proceeded through the night towards Choiseul; en route it was attacked by a single Japanese aircraft, with near miss being scored on one of the transport ships. Just prior to midnight, the convoy reached the assembly area about 2,000 yards (1,800 m) offshore of the chosen landing site at Voza, on the northwest side of the island. An advance reconnaissance party was sent ashore in rubber dinghies, and then Companies F and G led the Marines ashore. They landed unopposed early on 28 October. During the landing, Conway was attacked by a Japanese aircraft with several bombs. These bombs missed, and the destroyer held its fire so that it would not draw attention to the landing operations.

After a beachhead was established, the landing craft began ferrying supplies and equipment ashore, and with the assistance of around 80 local porters organized by Seton who had landed with the Marines, Krulak's battalion established a strong base on a plateau 1,000 yards (910 m) to the west of Voza, with radio communications and early warning outposts established to the north and south. From there Krulak intended to carry out raids across a broad front to simulate a larger force, with actions around Sangigai and in the western part of the island as far as Nukiki and the Warrior River across an area spanning approximately 25 miles (40 km). Shortly after arrival, as part of the deception plan, Krulak sent an uncoded radio message that he had landed a force of 20,000 on the island and was about to commence operations. Within two hours the stores had been unloaded and the APDs and destroyer escort had departed the area for the return journey to Vella Levalla. Four LCVP landing craft and their naval crews were detached at this time, detailed to support the Marines to move up and down the coast. Japanese aircraft attacked the landing beach shortly after the Marines came ashore and then again later in the day and in the evening, including an attack on Zinoa Island, where the Marines had hidden their landing craft. These attacks proved ineffective as the Marines had quickly dispersed their equipment. Efforts were also made to disguise the beachhead, and a dummy site was constructed further north to divert Japanese attention.

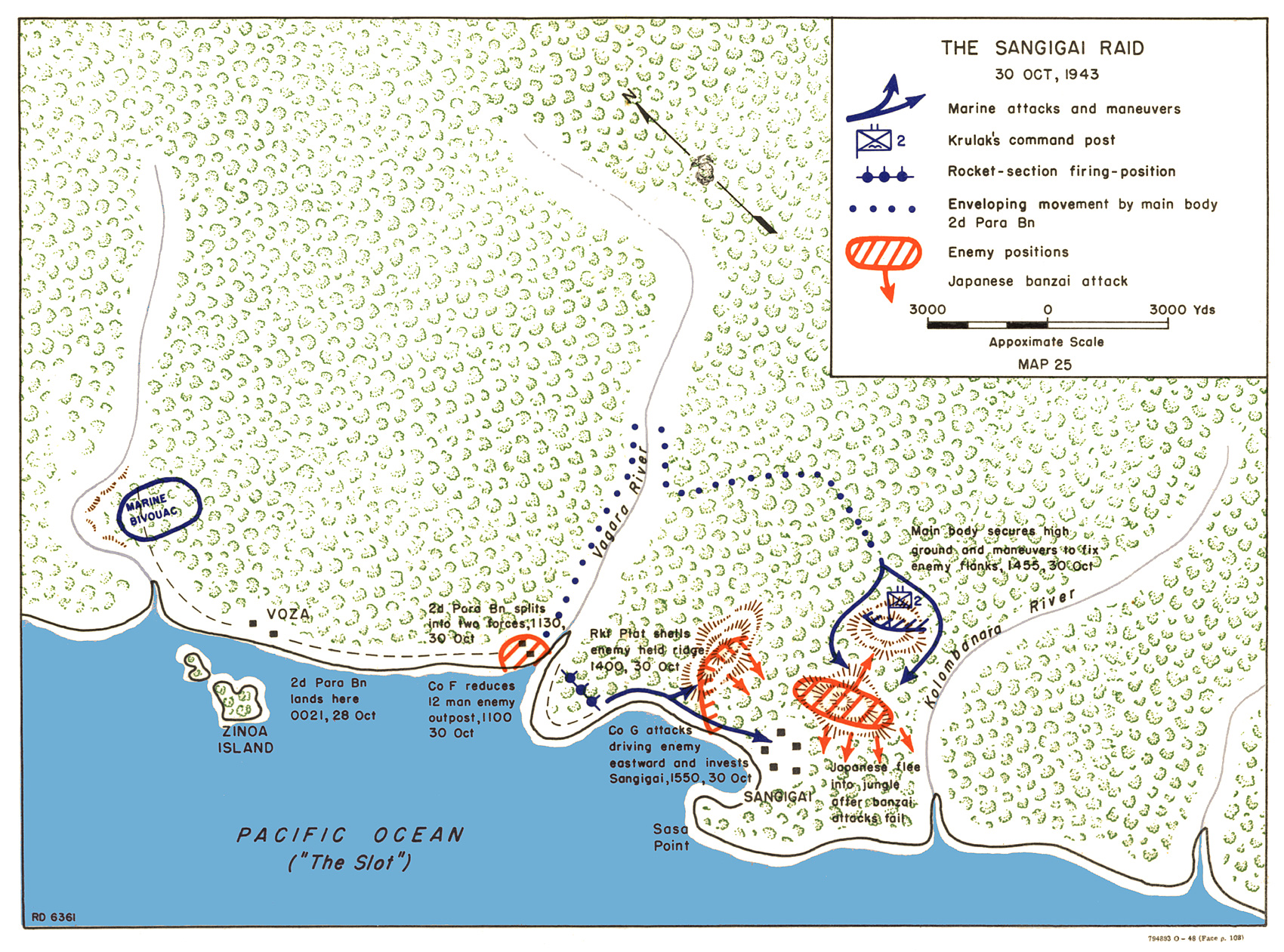
Fighting around Sangigai on October 30, 1943

Throughout the afternoon of 28 October, Krulak sent a patrol to scout a base for PT boats along the western seacoast. Meanwhile, Seton's local intelligence network also sent out patrols to identify the nearest Japanese defensive positions, determining that the main concentration was around Sangigai, with another smaller group 30 miles (48 km) northwest. On 29 October reconnaissance patrols were sent to the north and south to gather information on Japanese dispositions, defenses and avenues of approach and to make field sketches of important locations; other patrols, with attached Army and Navy specialists, reconnoitered Moli Point and various other locations to determine their suitability as PT boat bases or as locations for radar stations. One of the patrols attacked and killed seven Japanese and sunk a barge during a patrol towards the Vagara River near Sangigai. Later, a blocking force was sent to Vagara where it clashed with a platoon of Japanese. In response, Krulak determined that he would launch an attack on the main Japanese position at Sangigai the following day to disrupt any attempt to attack his base around Voza.

On 30 October Companies E and F, led by Krulak and supported by rocket and mortar-equipped support troops and a machine-gun section, attacked the barge base at Sangigai. Setting out at 04:00, they moved towards the landing craft around Zinoa Island with the intent to use them to advance down the coast. A preliminary air attack had been arranged, consisting of 12 Grumman TBF Avenger torpedo bombers, escorted by 26 fighters. These aircraft mistakenly strafed the US landing craft instead, damaging one of them. As a result, Krulak's two assault companies were forced to make their way towards their objective on foot led by Seton and his local guides. Meanwhile, the airstrike hit Sangigai at 06:10. A brisk firefight took place around Vagara around 11:00 as Japanese sentries fired on the advancing Marines, but they were forced to withdraw back to the main Japanese position around Sangigai.

The two Marine companies were split in order to launch the attack from two directions. Thick jungle and rugged terrain slowed the advance of Company F, under Krulak, which was moving inland to adopt a flanking position, and it was still moving into position when firing broke out north of the village around 14:00. At this time, Company E, under Captain Robert E. Manchester, had advanced along the coast was delayed by only a few minutes and brought its mortars and rockets into action, shelling a Japanese held ridge about 500 yards (460 m) north of the village, and then launched its attack. They secured the village a few minutes later. The Japanese defenders had withdrawn from Sangigai, moving inland where they advanced into fire from Company F positioned on the high ground east of the village near the Kolombanara River. From 14:30, further fighting took place during which the Marines attempted to envelop and then flank the Japanese who resorted to several direct attacks. Finally, after about an hour, the 40 Japanese survivors scattered and withdrew into the jungle.

The battle resulted in 72 Japanese being killed, while the Marines lost four killed and 12 wounded; Krulak was among those wounded. In the aftermath, the Marines searched the village for intelligence, and destroyed remaining Japanese equipment and facilities. They then withdrew to Vagara where a night defensive position was established. In the morning, the raiding party embarked on several landing craft and returned to Voza.

Throughout 31 October and 1 November the Marines undertook further patrolling actions around their base in anticipation of a Japanese counterattack; several minor clashes occurred between patrols. The Japanese reoccupied Sangigai, although they did not attack the Marine base around Voza. The wounded Marines were evacuated by a Consolidated PBY Catalina flying boat, and further supplies were flown in, including food for Seton's local guides.

On 1 November a patrol of 87 Marines from Company G—under the battalion's executive officer, Major Warner T. Bigger—was sent north by landing craft towards Nukiki. Landing near the Warrior River, the patrol went ashore with the intention of attacking the Japanese around Choiseul Bay with their 60 mm mortars. The boats were hidden in a cove near Nukiki, and a detachment of 4 men left in a base camp with a radio on the eastern bank of the river, along with the heavy equipment and explosives. The patrol then set off towards Choiseul Bay, but after crossing the river the guides assigned to the patrol became lost, and the Marines were forced to establish a bivouac and remain overnight while a smaller group was detached to reestablish contact with Voza to request another guide be sent.

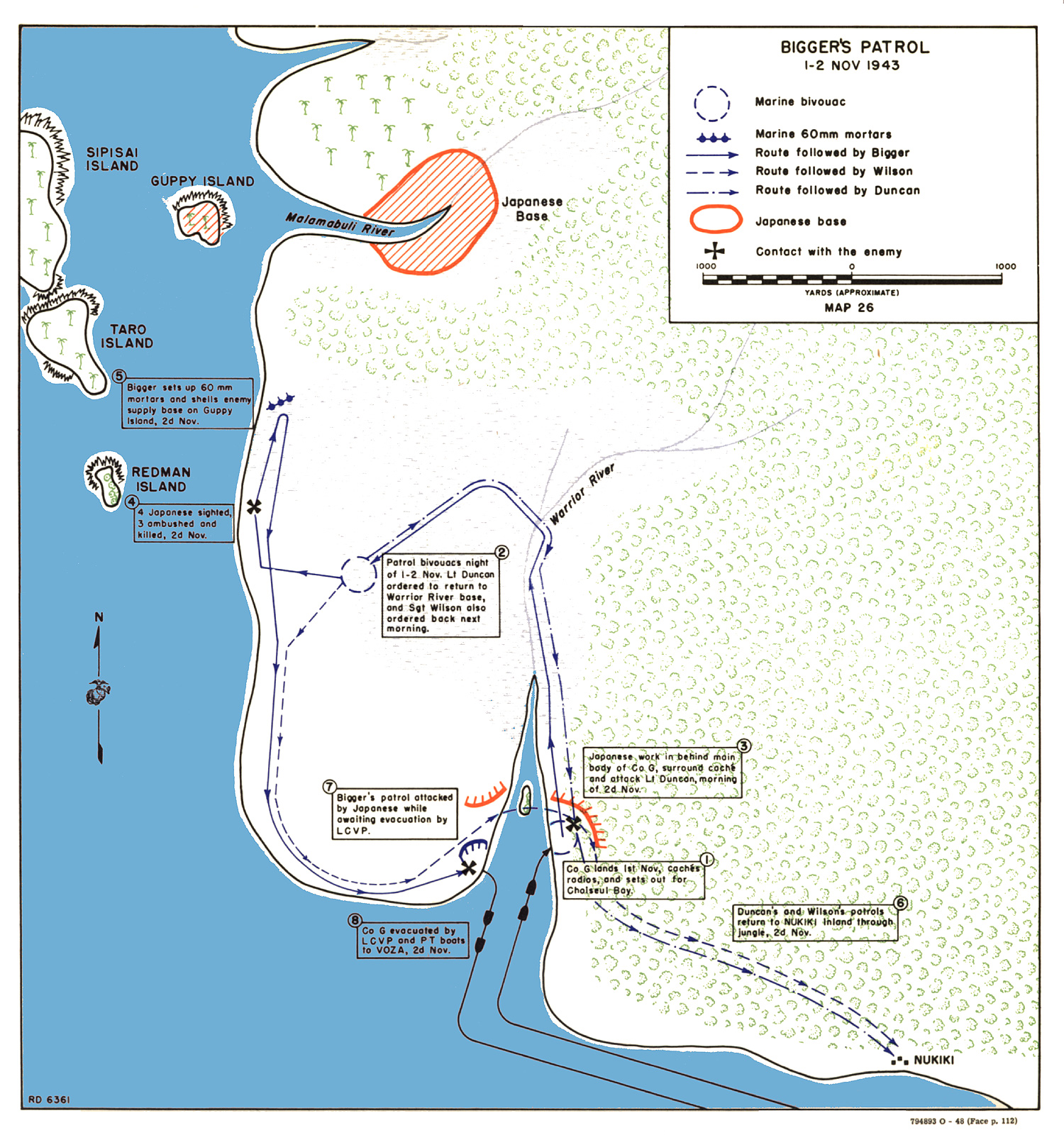
Patrol towards Nukiki and Guppy Island, November 1–2, 1943

Throughout the night, a group of Japanese cut off the two groups. Nevertheless, on 2 November the smaller group was able to re-embark at Nukiki and return to Voza without being detected, while the larger group under Bigger pressed on with its mission after detaching several men to return to the river to request extraction in the afternoon. Coming under fire near Redman Island from a small outpost that was quickly destroyed, Bigger decided to attack his alternate target, the Japanese supply and fuel dump on Guppy Island. From the beach, 143 mortar rounds were fired, setting the base ablaze.

As the Marines began to withdraw, the Japanese landed a force down the coast behind them to attempt to cut off their withdrawal. Fighting off four separate attacks, Bigger's force established a position on the western bank of the Warrior River to await the arrival of the boats to withdraw the force. At this point, the raid was momentarily stalled when a Japanese ambush trapped between 40 and 50 Marines. Three Marines were severely wounded, one of them fatally. Ten of the Marines were picked up and rescued by the motor torpedo boat PT-59, under the command of Lieutenant John F. Kennedy, though fire from the PT-59 allowed the Navy time to rescue many other surviving Marines aboard another PT boat, PT-236, covered by air support from aircraft based on Munda.

Following the extraction of Bigger's force, the US command began considering withdrawing Krulak's Marines from Choiseul. The Japanese, realizing the small size of the force confronting them, had adopted increasingly aggressive patrols towards Vagara, where further patrol clashes had occurred on 1 November. Information gathered by Seton from local inhabitants indicated that the Japanese had amassed 800 – 1,000 men in Sangigai, while other troops were being concentrated to the north of the Marine base at Voza. In consultation with Seton, Krulak made preparations to move across the island if his base was cut off from the beach, but ultimately the US commanders decided to withdraw the Marines before this took place.

The Marines withdrew from the island aboard three LCI landing craft in the morning of 4 November following the successful lodgment of Allied troops at Cape Torokina. To cover their withdrawal, a mine field was laid and other booby traps were set; while the Marines loaded their supplies and equipment, several explosions were heard as Japanese patrols entered the minefield. After embarkation, the Marines returned to Vella Lavella, escorted by five PT boats under the command of Lieutenant Arthur H. Berndston.

== Aftermath ==
Following the withdrawal of the Marine battalion, the Japanese quickly reoccupied Voza in an effort to re-secure the area to support their continued evacuation operations. During the course of the operation, Krulak's battalion killed 143 Japanese troops and sank two Japanese barges, losing between 11 and 13 Marines killed and 15 wounded, in actions later described by Major General Roy Geiger as, "a series of short right jabs designed to throw the enemy off balance and conceal the real power of the left hook to his midriff at Empress Augusta Bay." Historian John Miller states that the ultimate impact of the raid on the Japanese response to the Allied Bougainville landings is unclear based on Japanese sources, although it is unlikely that the "diversion confirmed ...[the] belief that southern Bougainville was the main Allied objective". John Costello, however, points out that following the raid the Japanese moved thousands of reinforcements to Choiseul. Intelligence information captured during the raid also assisted Allied naval commanders to identify minefields around Cape Torokina, and conversely to mine areas that the Japanese believed free from mines. The withdrawal of the Marines confused the local Choiseul Islanders who had worked to assist them; nevertheless, Seton remained on Choiseul after the raid, assisting with locating several targets for Allied dive bombers to attack. He left the island in mid-to-late 1944.
