= Charles S. Farnsworth =

US Army officer and civic leader (1862–1955)

Charles Stewart Farnsworth
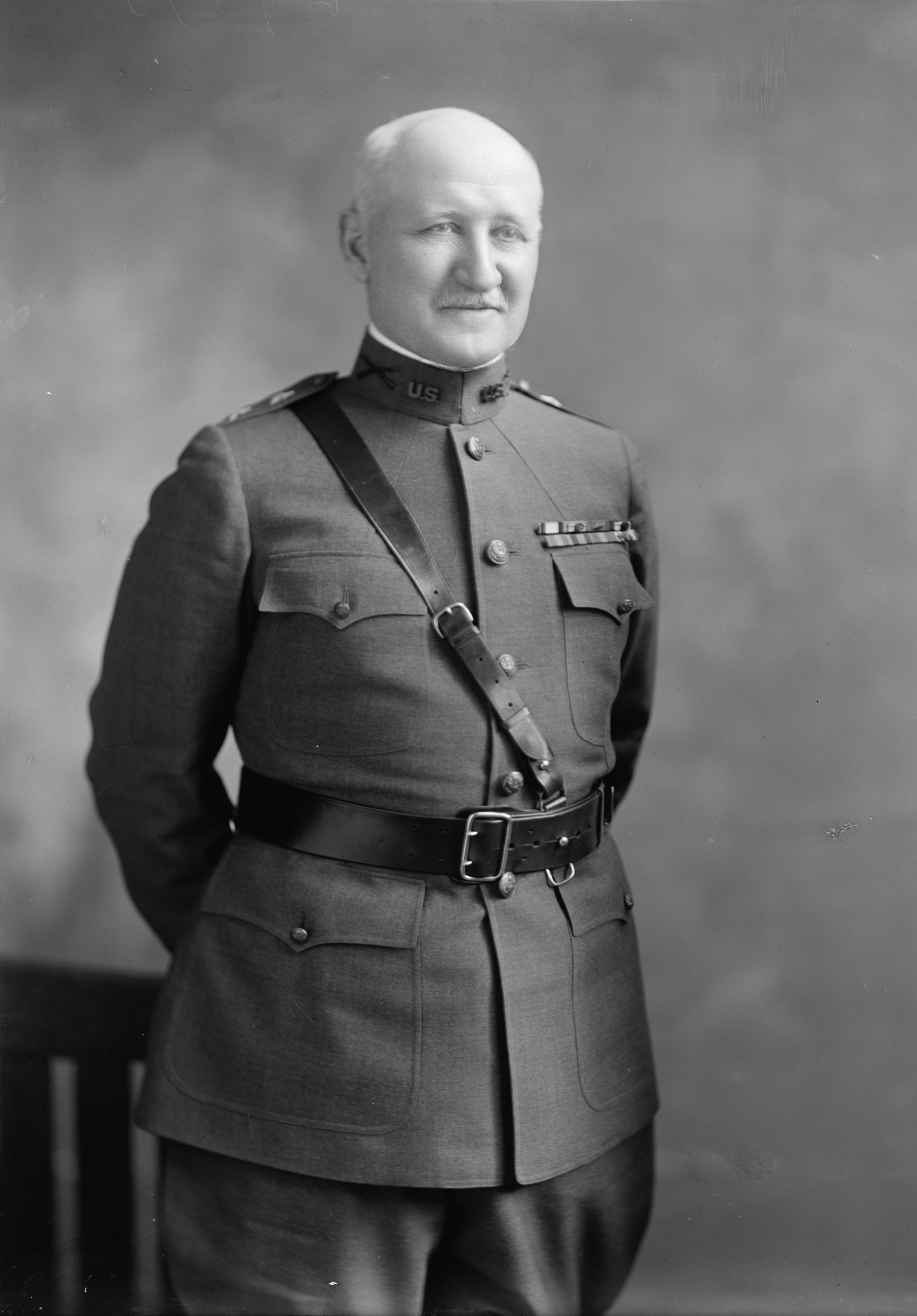
- Born: October 29, 1862; Lycoming County, Pennsylvania, United States
- Died: December 19, 1955 (aged 93) the Naval Hospital in Norco, California, United States
- Military career
- Allegiance: United States
- Branch: United States Army
- Service years: 1887–1925
- Rank: Major General
- Service number: 0-26
- Unit: Infantry Branch
- Commands: 159th Brigade; 37th Division; United States Army Infantry School
- Conflicts: Spanish–American War; World War I
- Awards: Army Distinguished Service Medal; Silver Star; Croix de Guerre with Palm (France); Legion of Honor (France); Order of Léopold (Belgium)

Charles Stewart Farnsworth (October 29, 1862 – December 19, 1955) was a United States Army officer and civic leader.

== Early life ==
Farnsworth was born in Lycoming County, Pennsylvania and attended local public schools. He worked for Western Union and the Bell Telephone company before being appointed to the United States Military Academy (USMA) at West Point, New York in 1883.

== Military career ==
Among his classmates there included several general officers of the future, such as Charles B. Wheeler, Edward C. Young, Richmond P. Davis, Edgar Russel, George O. Squier, Ernest Hinds, George W. Gatchell, Charles H. Martin, P. D. Lochridge, Nathaniel F. McClure, William C. Rivers, William Weigel, Thomas G. Hanson, Herman Hall, Marcus D. Cronin, Alexander L. Dade, Charles Gerhardt, James T. Dean, Ulysses G. McAlexander, Edmund Wittenmyer, Frederic D. Evans, Michael J. Lenihan, Mark L. Hersey and Frank H. Albright.

After graduating, 47th in a class of 64, Farnsworth was sent to various posts in the Great Plains. He was stationed at Fort Sisseton in South Dakota, Fort Shaw in Montana, and Fort Buford in North Dakota. In 1893 he became Professor of Military Science and Tactics at the University of North Dakota. In addition to his teaching job, Farnsworth was also head coach of the school's football team from 1895 to 1896.

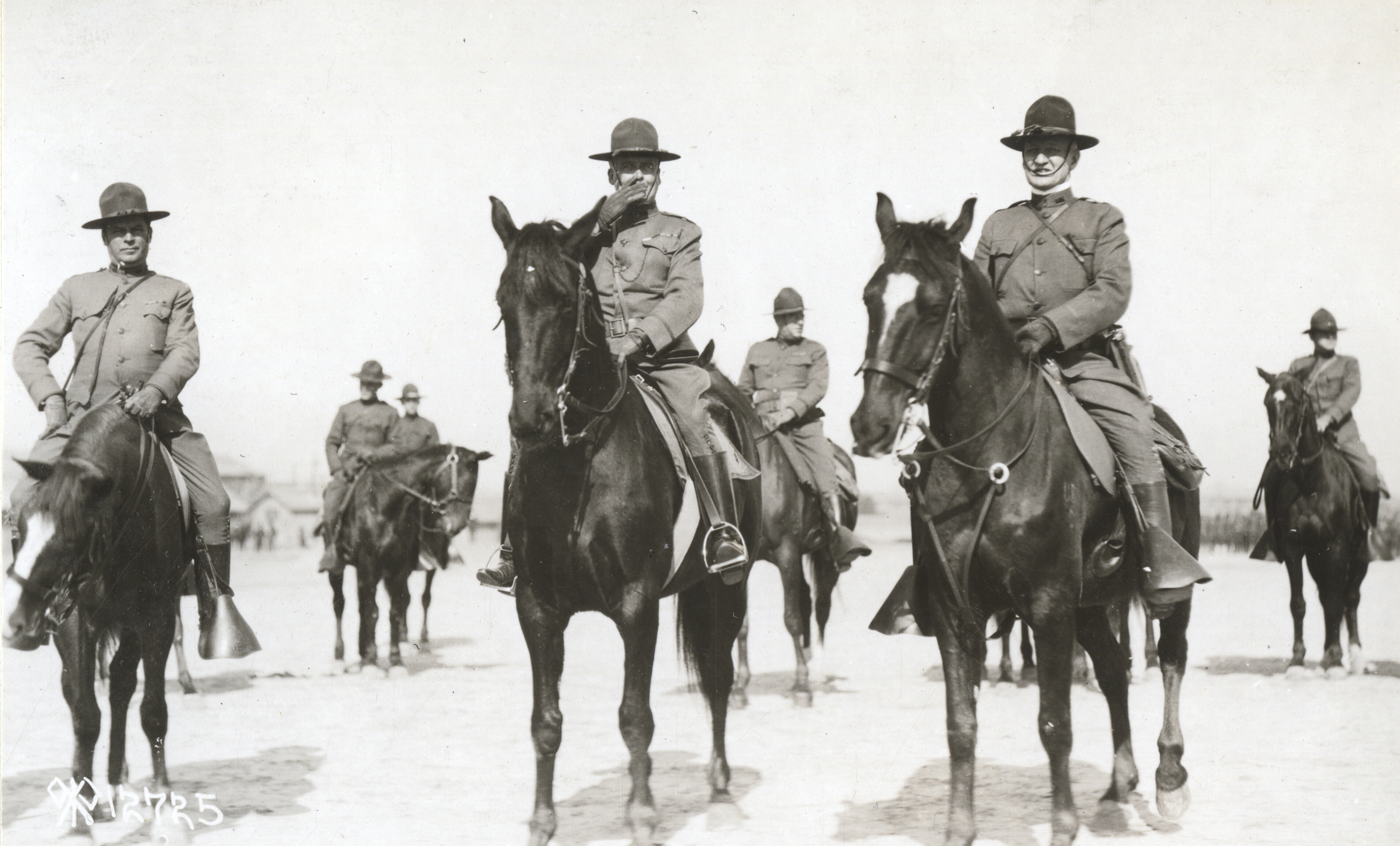
From left to right: Lieutenant Colonel Aloe, Brigadier General Lloyd Milton Brett, commanding the 160th Brigade, and Brigadier General Charles S. Farnsworth, commanding the 159th Brigade, at Camp Lee, Virginia, June 1918.

During the Spanish–American War, Farnsworth served as a quartermaster in Cuba and was an aide to Adna Chaffee.

After the war, Farnsworth was sent to Alaska where he founded and constructed Fort Gibbon. He was then sent to the Philippines where he founded and built Fort William McKinley. He also expanded the cantonments at the Presidio of San Francisco.

In 1909, he attended the U.S. Army Command and General Staff School. He graduated from the U.S. Army War College in 1916.

During the Pancho Villa Expedition into Mexico, Farnsworth served as a battalion commander and supply base commander.

Farnsworth was the commandant of the U.S. Army Infantry Training School at Fort Sill shortly after the American entry into World War I in April 1917. He then commanded the 159th Infantry Brigade, part of the 80th Infantry Division, at Camp Lee, Virginia. In 1918, Farnsworth was promoted to major general and placed in command of the 37th Infantry Division of the Ohio Army National Guard. Dana T. Merrill was the division's chief of staff. He brought the division to the Western Front, where it participated in the Battle of Saint-Mihiel and the Meuse–Argonne offensive.

For his service during World War I, Farnsworth received the Army Distinguished Service Medal and the Silver Star medal. The citation for his Army DSM reads:

The President of the United States of America, authorized by Act of Congress, July 9, 1918, takes pleasure in presenting the Army Distinguished Service Medal to Major General Charles Stewart Farnsworth, United States Army, for exceptionally meritorious and distinguished services to the Government of the United States, in a duty of great responsibility during World War I. In command of the 37th Division, General Farnsworth's efficient leadership and military ability were important factors in the successful operations in the Meuse-Argonne offensive, and later proved their worth when this division served with the French and Belgian forces in Belgium.

While the Silver Star citation reads as follows:

By direction of the President, under the provisions of the act of Congress approved July 9, 1918 (Bul. No. 43, W.D., 1918), Major General Charles Stewart Farnsworth, United States Army, is cited by the Commanding General, American Expeditionary Forces, for gallantry in action and a silver star may be placed upon the ribbon of the Victory Medals awarded him. Major General Farnsworth distinguished himself by gallantry in action while serving as Commanding General, 37th Division, American Expeditionary Forces, in action near Montfaucon, France, 28 September 1918, in coming up to within four hundred yards of the front lines on horseback under an intense artillery bombardment.

He also received the Croix de Guerre with Palm and the Legion of Honor from France. From Belgium, he received the Order of Léopold.

After World War I, he commanded Camp Bowie, Texas before being ordered to Fort Benning, Georgia. There, Farnsworth organized the U.S. Army Infantry School and served as its first commandant. In July 1920, Farnsworth became Chief of Infantry. He served in that position until his retirement in 1925. As Chief of Infantry, Farnsworth traveled around the country inspecting reserve units and R.O.T.C. programs. He also reviewed reports by junior officers George S. Patton and Dwight D. Eisenhower on infantry tactics and the use of armor. Farnsworth dismissed both reports and retired from the army on March 27, 1925.

== Later life and civic leadership ==
Farnsworth and his wife moved to Altadena, California after his retirement and lived on Las Flores Drive, close to his son. They became involved in the community. Gen. Farnsworth was the president of the Altadena Citizens' Association and the Altadena Beautification League. He sat as president of the board of the La Vina Sanitorium. He was also a member of the Los Angeles County Planning Commission and the Criminal Complaints Committee of the Los Angeles County Grand Jury.

In 1931, Farnsworth was Grand Marshal of the Tournament of Roses and was one of a few to ride a horse down the parade route in modern times.

Farnsworth was instrumental in the creation of Altadena Park in 1934. Farnsworth led the fundraising, designed the park, and supervised its grading and landscaping. The park was renamed in his honor in 1939.

His wife died in 1951. He died in 1955 at the Naval Hospital in Norco, California. They are both buried at the cemetery at the Presidio of San Francisco.

The Farnsworth Family Papers (Robert J. Farnsworth and Charles S. Farnsworth) collection is housed in the Rasmuson Library Archives, University of Alaska Fairbanks.

== Personal life ==
While at Fort Shaw, he married Laura Galey. They had one son, Robert. She died in 1890.

In 1894, he married Helen Bosard of Grand Forks, North Dakota. They had no children.

== Head coaching record ==
Year	Team	Overall	Conference	Standing	Bowl/playoffs
North Dakota Flickertails (Independent) (1895–1896)
1895	North Dakota	1–1			
1896	North Dakota	2–0			
North Dakota:		3–1			
Total:		3–1			

Military offices
Preceded by Joseph A. Gaston	Commanding General 37th Division; May–December 1918	Succeeded by William M. Fassett
Preceded by Henry E. Eames	Commandant of the United States Army Infantry School; 1920–1925	Succeeded by Walter H. Gordon
