= USS LST-449 =

1942 United States Navy landing ship

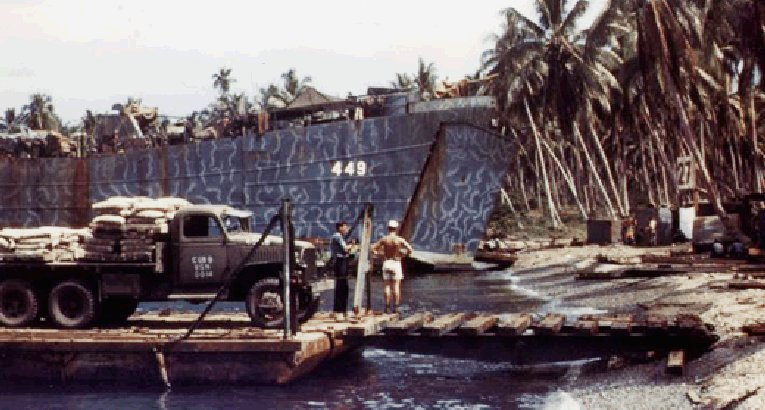
- USS LST-449, loading equipment and supplies from a Guadalcanal beach for her journey north to Bougainville Island, in November 1943, soon after Marines landed there.

History

United States
- Name: LST-449
- Ordered: as a Type S3-M-K2 hull, MCE hull 969
- Builder: Kaiser Shipbuilding Company, Vancouver, Washington
- Yard number: 153
- Laid down: 10 July 1942
- Launched: 30 September 1942
- Commissioned: 31 December 1942
- Decommissioned: 16 March 1946
- Identification: Hull symbol: LST-449; Code letters: NFDG
- Honors and awards: 5 × battle stars
- Fate: Sold, 27 January 1947

General characteristics
- Class & type: LST-1-class tank landing ship
- Displacement: 4,080 long tons (4,145 t) full load; 2,160 long tons (2,190 t) landing
- Length: 328 ft (100 m) oa
- Beam: 50 ft (15 m)
- Draft: Full load: 8 ft 2 in (2.49 m) forward; 14 ft 1 in (4.29 m) aft; Landing at 2,160 t: 3 ft 11 in (1.19 m) forward; 9 ft 10 in (3.00 m) aft
- Installed power: 2 × 900 hp (670 kW) Electro-Motive Diesel 12-567A diesel engines; 1,700 shp (1,300 kW)
- Propulsion: 1 × Falk main reduction gears; 2 × Propellers
- Speed: 12 kn (22 km/h; 14 mph)
- Range: 24,000 nmi (44,000 km; 28,000 mi) at 9 kn (17 km/h; 10 mph) while displacing 3,960 long tons (4,024 t)
- Boats & landing craft carried: 2 or 6 x LCVPs
- Capacity: 2,100 tons oceangoing maximum; 350 tons main deckload
- Troops: 16 officers, 147 enlisted men
- Complement: 13 officers, 104 enlisted men
- Armament: Varied, ultimate armament; 2 × twin 40 mm (1.57 in) Bofors guns; 4 × single 40 mm Bofors guns; 12 × 20 mm (0.79 in) Oerlikon cannons

Service record
- Part of: LST Flotilla 5
- Operations: Consolidation of the southern Solomons (7 April 1943); Occupation and defense of Cape Torokina (11 November, 3–4 and 15 December 1943); Assault and occupation of Guam (21–28 July 1944); Assault and occupation of Iwo Jima (19–25 February 1945); Assault and occupation of Okinawa Gunto (1–15 April 1945)
- Awards: Combat Action Ribbon; Navy Unit Commendation; American Campaign Medal; Asiatic–Pacific Campaign Medal; World War II Victory Medal; Navy Occupation Service Medal w/Asia Clasp

USS LST-449 was a United States Navy LST-1-class tank landing ship used in the Asiatic-Pacific Theater during World War II.

== Construction ==
LST-449 was laid down on 10 July 1942, under Maritime Commission (MARCOM) contract, MC hull 969, by Kaiser Shipyards, Vancouver, Washington; launched on 30 September 1942; and commissioned on 31 December 1942.

== Service history ==
During the war, LST-449 was assigned to the Pacific Theater of Operations. She took part in the consolidation of the southern Solomons in April 1943; the occupation and defense of Cape Torokina November and December 1943; the assault and occupation of Guam July 1944; the assault and occupation of Iwo Jima in February 1945; and the assault and occupation of Okinawa Gunto April 1945.

== Post-war service ==
Following the war, LST-449 performed occupation duty in the Far East until early November 1945. She returned to the United States and was decommissioned on 16 March 1946, and struck from the Navy list on 28 March, that same year. On 27 January 1947, the tank landing ship was sold to a private purchaser for scrapping.

== Honors and awards ==
LST-449 earned five battle stars for her World War II service.

== Notes ==
Citations

== Bibliography ==
Online resources

- "LST-449". Dictionary of American Naval Fighting Ships. Naval History and Heritage Command. This article incorporates text from this source, which is in the public domain.
- "Kaiser Vancouver, Vancouver WA". www.ShipbuildingHistory.com. 27 November 2010.
- "USS LST-449". NavSource. 4 October 2014.
