= Battle of the Lys =

The Battle of the Lys may refer to:

- Battle of the Lys (1918), part of the German Spring Offensive
- Battle of the Lys and the Escaut (1918), part of the Allied Hundred Days Offensive
- Battle of the Lys (1940), a battle during the Second World War near the Belgian city of Kortrijk (Courtrai)
