= 166th Infantry Regiment (United States) =

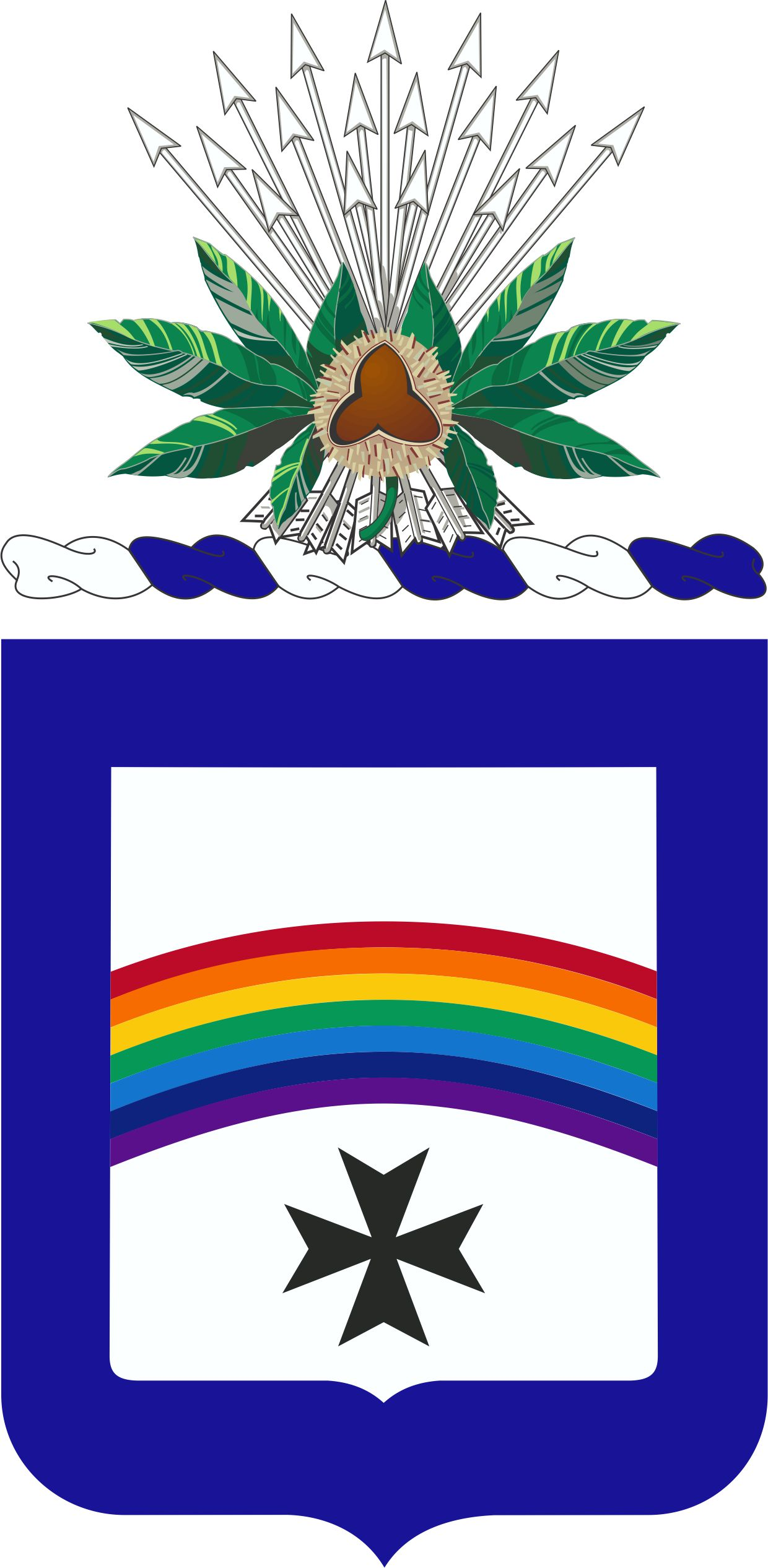
- 166th Infantry Regiment Coat of Arms
- Active: 1877-99; 1899–1919; 1921–45; 1946–92
- Country: United States
- Allegiance: Ohio
- Branch: United States Army
- Type: Infantry
- Size: Regiment
- Motto: "Follow Me"
- Engagements: Spanish–American War: Puerto Rico Campaign; World War I: Meuse-Argonne Offensive

Insignia
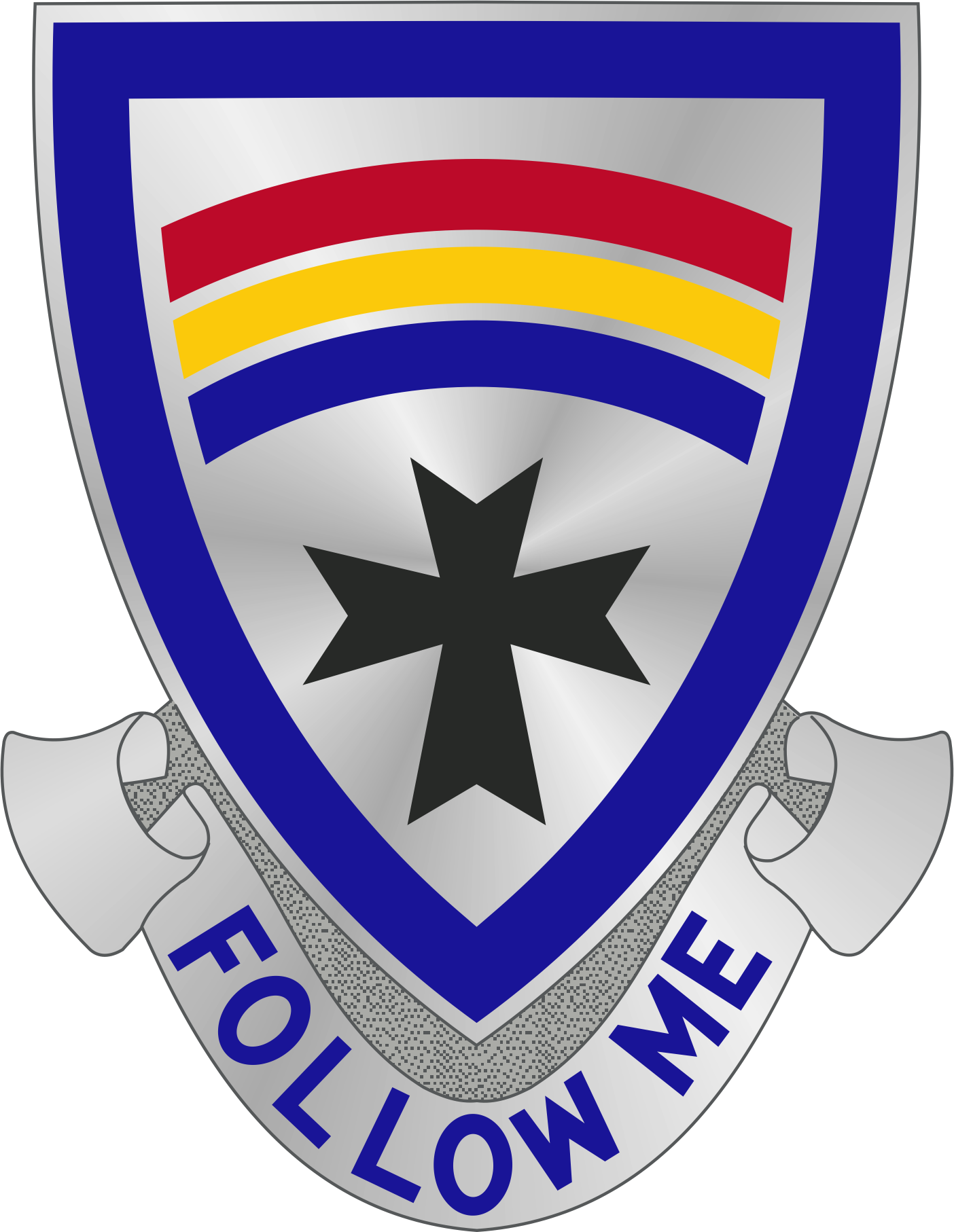
- Distinctive Unit Insignia

The 166th Infantry Regiment was an infantry regiment of the United States Army. It was part of the Ohio National Guard. In 1992, the regiment was consolidated with the 148th Infantry Regiment.

== Mexican–American War and Civil War ==
The 166th Infantry Regiment traces its history back to the Mexican–American War. On 23 June 1846, the 2nd Regiment, Ohio Volunteer Infantry was mustered into federal service at Camp Washington. The regiment was organized from companies in south-central Ohio. It mustered out of federal service a year later in New Orleans. It was reorganized and mustered into federal service again on 1 September 1847 at Camp Wool but mustered out on 26 July 1848 at Cincinnati. Between 1855 and 1861, the regiment was reorganized as independent companies in Ohio. In April 1861, it was reorganized at Camp Jackson as the 3rd and 4th Regiments, Ohio Volunteer Infantry. The 3rd was mustered in on 27 April and the 4th on 2 May for a three-month service period. Three year service term regiments with the same numerical designation were mustered in on 5 June for the 3rd and 12 June for the 4th at Camp Dennison. The 3rd Ohio Infantry was mustered out on 23 June 1864 in Cincinnati but the 4th Ohio Infantry was reorganized as the 4th Battalion, Ohio Volunteer Infantry, in June 1864. The 4th Battalion was mustered out on 12 June 1865 in Jeffersonville.

== Interlude and Spanish–American War ==
Between 1870 and 1877, the regiment was reorganized as independent companies based in south-central Ohio. During 1876 and 1877, the companies were consolidated as a result of labor unrest and became the 5th, 6th and 14th Infantry Regiments of the Ohio National Guard. On 27 July 1878, the 5th Infantry was consolidated into the 6th and 14th; the 6th and 14th were combined on 14 June 1890 to become the 14th Infantry Regiment. As a result of the outbreak of the Spanish–American War, the 14th Infantry was mustered into federal service on 9 May 1898 at Camp Bushnell as the 4th Ohio Volunteer Infantry. They were soon transferred to Camp George R. Thomas in Chickamauga Park, Georgia. The regiment became part of the Army of the Gulf. On 22 July, it embarked for Newport News and was loaded onto the SS Saint Paul. On 3 August, the regiment landed at Arroyo in Puerto Rico and fought in the Puerto Rican Campaign until the end of hostilities on 13 August. On 29 October, the 4th Ohio embarked on the SS Chester for the voyage back to America. After landing at New York City on 3 November, they were reviewed by President McKinley after being moved to Washington, D.C. The regiment was mustered out at Columbus on 20 January 1899. On 14 April, the regiment was disbanded. It was reorganized as the 4th Infantry Regiment of the Ohio National Guard on 14 July 1899.

== World War I ==
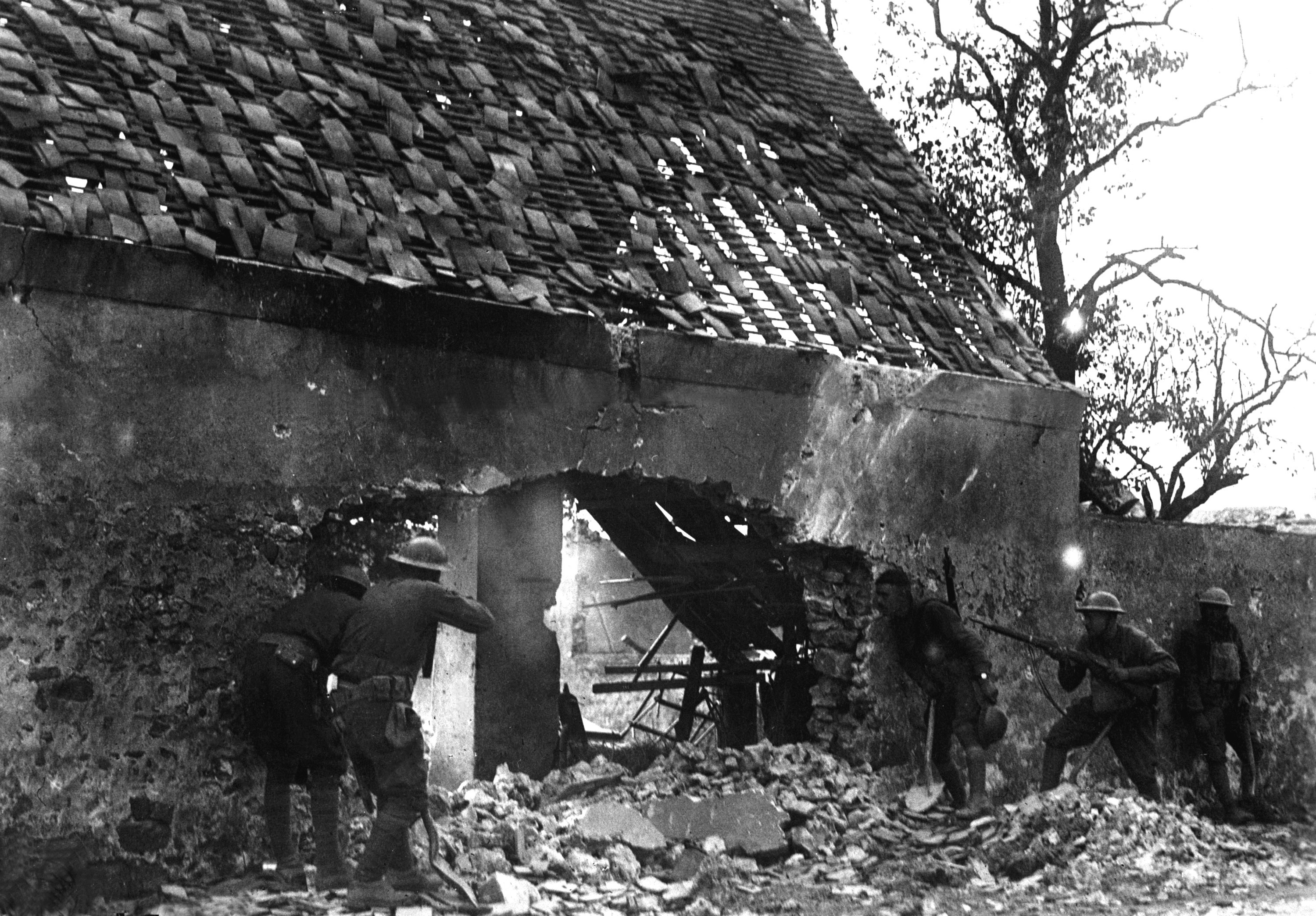
Snipers of the 166th Infantry in a nest firing at Germans on the other side of Villers-sur-Fère, 30 July 1918

The regiment was mustered into federal service on 11 July 1916 in Camp Willis and mustered out on 3 March 1917 at Fort Wayne. On 15 July, the regiment was called into federal service due to the United States entry into World War I. It was drafted into federal service on 5 August. It was reorganized as the 166th Infantry Regiment on 20 August and assigned to the 42nd Infantry Division's 83rd Infantry Brigade. It arrived on the Western Front in February 1918 and fought until the end of the war on 11 November. The regiment participated in the Battle of Saint-Mihiel and the Meuse-Argonne Offensive. The regiment returned stateside and was demobilized on 17 May 1919 at Camp Sherman, Ohio.

== Interwar period ==
The 166th Infantry arrived at the port of New York on 25 April 1919 on the troopship USS Leviathan and was demobilized on 17 May 1919 at Camp Sherman, Ohio. Former elements of the regiment were consolidated with elements of the former 7th Ohio Infantry (which had been broken up and assigned to various elements of the 37th Division during World War I) on 21 May 1920 to become the 4th Infantry Regiment, Ohio National Guard, with headquarters at Columbus. Pursuant to the National Defense Act of 1920, the 166th Infantry was reconstituted in the National Guard and assigned to the 37th Division on 1 July 1921. The regiment, or elements thereof, was called up to perform the following state duties: riot control during a coal miners’ strike at Cadiz and Zanesville, Ohio, 14 July 1922 – 8 August 1922; escort duties at the funeral of President Warren G. Harding in August 1923; tornado relief duties at Lorain and Sandusky, Ohio, 28 June–16 July 1924; guard duties at the crash site of the dirigible USS Shenandoah in September 1925; riot control during a coal miners’ strikes at St. Clairsville and Nelsonville, Ohio, 4 August 1927 – 10 June 1928; riot control during the Ohio State Penitentiary riot and fire, 21 April–3 June 1930; riot control during a coal miners’ strike at Cadiz, 16 April–20 July 1932; flood relief along the Ohio River, January–March 1937; riot control during a workers’ strike at the Mahoning Valley steel plants, 22 June–15 July 1937. Conducted annual summer training most years at Camp Perry, Ohio, from 1921–39.

== World War II ==
On 15 October 1940, the 166th Infantry was inducted into federal service at home stations. Ten days later, it was relocated to Camp Shelby, Mississippi. It was relieved from assignment to the 37th Division on 16 January 1942, becoming a separate unit. The regiment moved to New Orleans, Louisiana on 12 February, and the 1st Battalion was detached as part of Task Force 1291, serving as a garrison unit in Aruba and Curaçao in the Caribbean. The 166th was transferred to Fort Barrancas, Florida on 2 October 1942, without the 1st and 2nd Battalions. On 15 April 1943, it returned to Camp Shelby and became part of the Third Army, where the 2nd Battalion rejoined the regiment. On 18 April 1943, the regiment was assigned to the Southern Defense Command at New Orleans, without the 2nd Battalion which was located at Texas City, Texas. On 20 August 1943, the 166th Infantry Regiment was authorized to be reorganized; the 1st Battalion returned to the regiment without personnel on 1 September 1943, and a new 1st Battalion was formed. On 7 September, the regiment, less the 2nd Battalion (which was assigned to Camp Hood, Texas), was ordered to move to Fort Sill, Oklahoma. On 22 January 1944, the 166th Infantry Regiment, less the 2nd and 3rd Battalion and Company D, was inactivated at Fort Sill. The 3rd Battalion and Company D became part of the Replacement and School Command on 1 February 1944. The 2nd Battalion was inactivated on 22 February at Camp Hood, Company D was inactivated on 17 November 1944, and the 3rd Battalion was inactivated on 12 February 1945.

== Cold War ==
The 166th Infantry Regiment was reorganized on 11 November 1946 as part of the Ohio National Guard. On 1 September 1959, it became a parent regiment under the Combat Arms Regimental System. It consisted of the 1st Battle Group, part of the 37th Infantry Division. It was reorganized on 1 April 1963 to consist of the 1st Battalion, still part of the 37th. It was again reorganized on 15 February 1968 to consist of the 1st Battalion and was transferred to the 38th Infantry Division. It was transferred on 1 March 1977 to the 73rd Infantry Brigade. On 1 May 1989, it was withdrawn from the Combat Arms Regimental System and reorganized under the U.S. Army Regimental System. It was consolidated on 1 September 1992 with the 148th Infantry Regiment. The new unit, designated the 148th Infantry, consisted of the 1st Battalion of that regiment, part of the 73rd Infantry Brigade. Its new headquarters was in Lima, Ohio.
