= Battle of the Lys and the Escaut =

Battle during the First World War

Battle of the Lys and the Escaut, 1918
- Part of the Hundred Days Offensive of the First World War
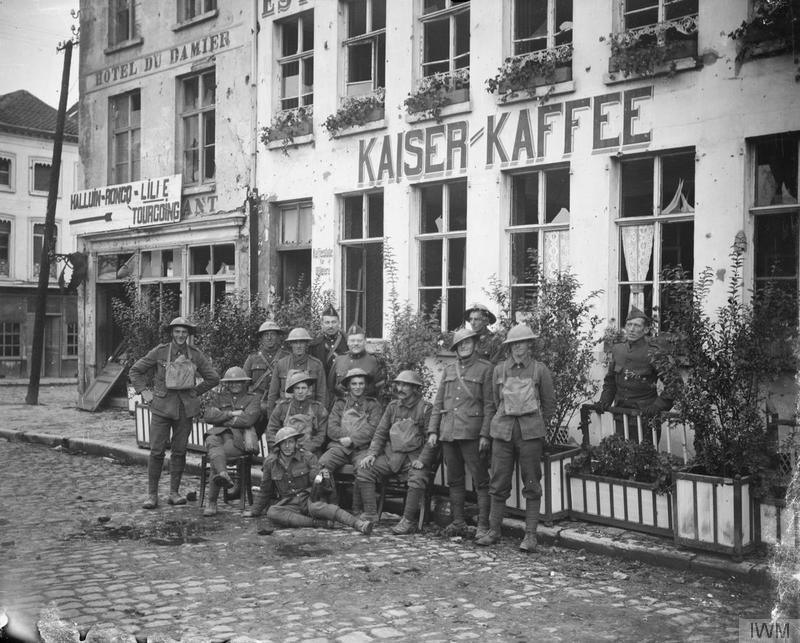
- British and Belgian soldiers outside a German cafeteria called "Kaiser Kaffee" in Menin, October 1918.
Date	20 October – 11 November 1918
Location	East Flanders, Belgium 50°51′N 03°36′E
Result	Allied victory

Belligerents
Belgium; British Empire; France; United States	German Empire

Commanders and leaders
(Belgium) King Albert I (French Third Republic) Jean Degoutte (United Kingdom of Great Britain and Ireland) Herbert Plumer (French Third Republic) Antoine Baucheron de Boissoudy	(German Empire) Erich Ludendorff (German Empire) Crown Prince Rupprecht (German Empire) Friedrich Sixt von Armin (German Empire) Ferdinand von Quast

The Battle of the Lys and the Escaut was the third and last phase of the Second Battle of Belgium (French: 2ème Bataille de Belgique) or the Ypres-Lys Offensive, and took place in Belgium between 20 October and 11 November 1918.

== Background ==
In August 1918, the Allied Command launched an offensive across the Western Front. In Belgium the Groupe d'Armées des Flandres (GAF) was formed under the command of King Albert I of Belgium, with the French General Jean Degoutte as Chief of Staff, comprising twelve Belgian divisions, ten divisions of the British Second Army and six divisions of the French Sixth Army.

In the first phase of the offensive, the German 4th Army was defeated in the Fifth Battle of Ypres (28 September – 2 October) and Passchendale was retaken. Mud and a collapse of the supply-system had stopped the advance in early October but by the middle of the month the GAF launched the second phase of the offensive, the Battle of Courtrai. The French took Roulers, the Belgians Ostend, Bruges and Zeebrugge and the British Courtrai, Lille and Douai.

The advance exhausted the Allied troops and the 37th and 91st divisions of the US Army were sent to Belgium to support the third phase of the offensive, which had as its goal driving the Germans east of the Escaut (Scheldt) River.

== Order of Battle of the Allied Army (North to South) ==
The following forces were assigned to the Allied army: 69

- Belgian Army (King Albert I of Belgium)
  - 12 divisions
- French 6th Army (Antoine Baucheron de Boissoudy)
  - 34th Army Corps (Lt-Gen Alphonse Nudant)
    - 77th French Division
    - 70th French Division
    - 11th French Division
  - 30th Army Corps (Lt-Gen Hippolyte-Alphonse Pénet)
    - 12th French Division
    - 37th US Division
  - 7th Army Corps (Lt-Gen André Massenet)
    - 128th French Division
    - 91st US Division
    - 41st French Division
- British 2nd Army (General Herbert Plumer)
  - 10 divisions

== Battle ==
In the north, the Germans had taken up positions behind the Deinze-Bruges Canal and put up fierce resistance against Belgian attacks between 20 and 31 October. On 2 November, the Germans were forced to fall back on the Ghent–Terneuzen Canal, which they held until the end of the war. By 10 November, the Belgian Army had reached the western outskirts of Ghent.

In the south, the British army advanced steadily. Valenciennes was taken on 2 November, and Mons was reached on 10 November. Here, George Edwin Ellison and George Lawrence Price were killed. They were the last British and British Empire soldiers to be killed during the First World War.

In the center, the 91st US Division suffered heavy losses against strong German resistance in Spitaals Bosschen near Waregem. The French 6th Army and 37th US Division advanced with less difficulty between the Lys and Escaut, but encountered stiff resistance when they reached the Escaut on 1 November. Several attempts to cross the river in the night of 1–2 November failed; only the 37th US Division succeeded in gaining a bridgehead at Oudenaarde. Between 3 November and 8 November, the allies were forced to rest and reorganize their forces. On 8 and 9 November the French launched a new attack, which was repulsed by the Germans, but which nevertheless resulted in a new bridgehead between Oudenaarde and Melden.

== Aftermath ==
A new offensive to cross the Escaut which aimed at reaching Brussels was planned for 10 November, but this was cancelled when it became clear an armistice was imminent.

The German retreat had not been a rout, but was relatively well organized with very mobile "Maschinen Gewehr Kompanien" attacking the advancing Allies and which inflicted many casualties. The Belgian Army, for instance, lost one-fifth of its forces between 4 October and 11 November 1918, one-third of all the losses it sustained throughout the whole war.

The sudden end of the war came as a surprise to many Allied soldiers, as well as German soldiers. This contributed to the Stab-in-the-back myth, which stated that the German Army was not yet defeated on the battlefield, but was instead betrayed by socialist and Jewish politicians on the home front.
