= William M. Fassett =

United States Army general

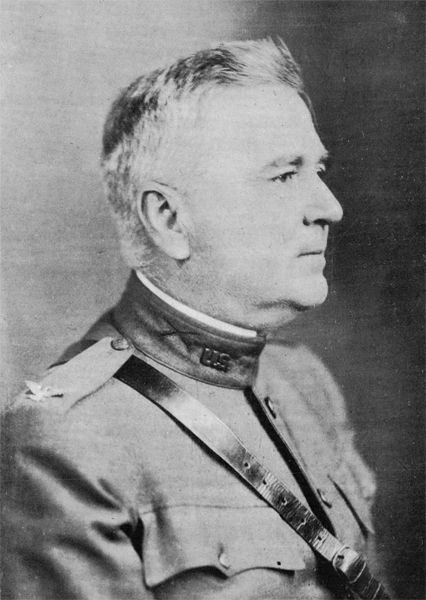
- Born: January 28, 1876; Nashua, New Hampshire, U.S.
- Died: March 23, 1958 (aged 82); Orlando, Florida, U.S.
- Military career
- Allegiance: United States
- Branch: United States Army
- Service years: 1897–1924
- Rank: Brigadier General
- Service number: 0-563
- Unit: Infantry Branch
- Commands: 37th Division
- Conflicts: Spanish–American War; Philippine–American War; World War I
- Awards: Distinguished Service Medal; Silver Star; Legion of Honour; Croix de guerre

William Mason Fassett (January 28, 1876 – March 23, 1958) was a United States Army officer in the late 19th and early 20th centuries. He served in the Spanish–American War, Philippine–American War, and World War I, and he received the Army Distinguished Service Medal among several other awards.

== Biography ==
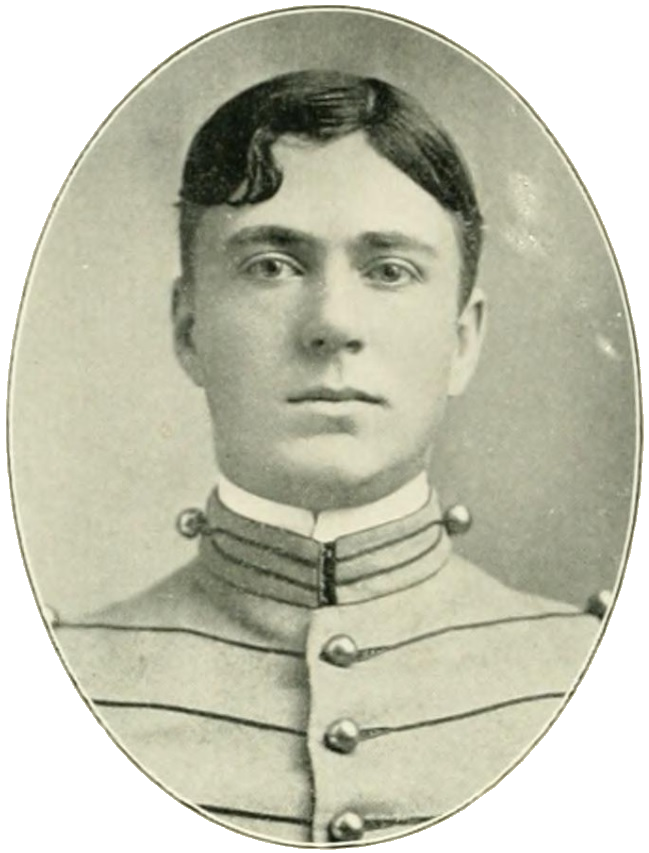
Fassett as a cadet.

Fassett was born on January 28, 1876, in Nashua, New Hampshire. He graduated from the United States Military Academy in 1897 and was commissioned into the infantry.

Fassett served in the Spanish–American War in Santiago de Cuba, and he earned a Silver Star in that conflict. He then participated in the Philippine–American War.

Fassett spent two years as a student officer at Fort Leavenworth, graduating from the Army School of the Line in 1908 and the Army Staff College in 1909.

After serving in various positions in the United States, Fassett became the Chief of Staff of the 31st Infantry Division. After his promotion to the rank of brigadier general on October 1, 1918, Fassett assumed command of the 37th Division of the American Expeditionary Forces (AEF). In addition to receiving the Army Distinguished Service Medal for his performance, Belgium awarded him the Croix de Guerre and France awarded him the Legion of Honour. The citation for his Army DSM reads:

The President of the United States of America, authorized by Act of Congress, July 9, 1918, takes pleasure in presenting the Army Distinguished Service Medal to Brigadier General William Mason Fassett, United States Army, for exceptionally meritorious and distinguished services to the Government of the United States, in a duty of great responsibility during World War I. In the forcing of the crossing of the Escaut River, Belgium, in November 1918, and the establishment of a bridgehead thereat, General Fassett demonstrated his ability as a leader. The successful operation of his brigade in this and in ensuing actions were greatly influenced by his efforts.

After reverting to his permanent rank of colonel, Fassett retired from the military in January 1924. Congress restored his brigadier general rank in June 1930. As a retiree, Fassett raised citrus fruit in Florida, and he died in Orlando on March 23, 1958.

=== Personal life ===
Fassett never married.

== Bibliography ==
- Davis, Henry Blaine Jr. (1998). Generals in Khaki. Raleigh, North Carolina: Pentland Press. ISBN 1571970886. OCLC 40298151.
- Marquis Who's Who (1975). Who Was Who In American History – The Military. Chicago, Illinois: Marquis Who's Who. ISBN 0837932017.
