= 117th Engineer Battalion (United States) =

Engineer Battalion of the United States Army

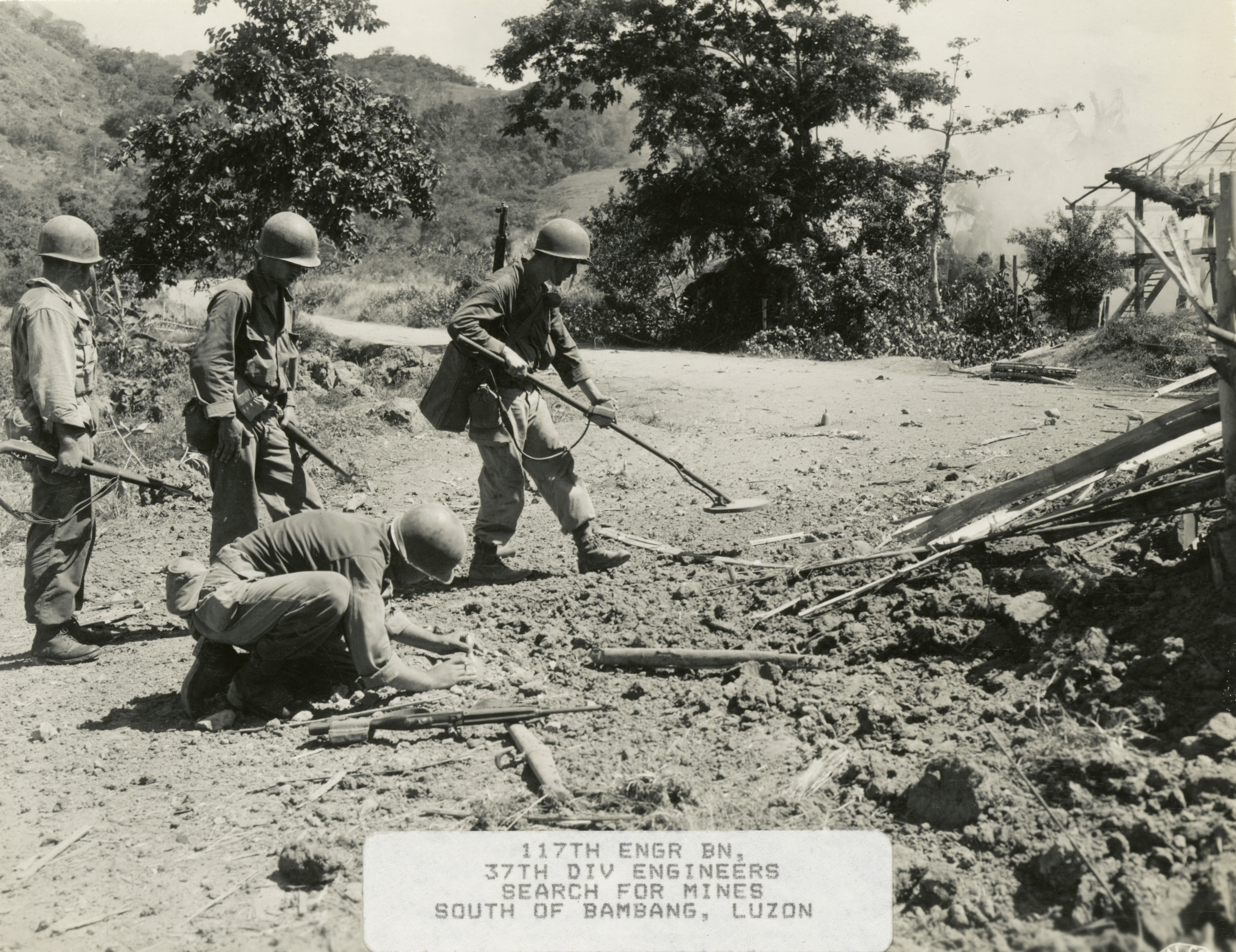
Members of the 117th Engineer Battalion clearing mines in the Philippines, c. 1944

The 117th Engineer Battalion of the United States Army was a part of the 37th Infantry Division. It was involved in the Pacific Theatre of World War II. The battalion received the Presidential Unit Citation in 1945.
