= 37th Infantry Division (United States) =

- 37th ID Shoulder Sleeve Insignia
- Active: 1917–1919; 1923–1968
- Country: United States
- Branch: Army
- Type: Infantry
- Role: Headquarters
- Size: Division
- Part of: Army National Guard
- Nickname: "Buckeye Division"
- Colors: Red and blue
- Engagements: World War I: Ypres-Lys; Meuse-Argonne; World War II: Northern Solomons; Luzon

Commanders
- Notable commanders: Charles S. Farnsworth; Robert S. Beightler; Philip D. Ginder

Insignia
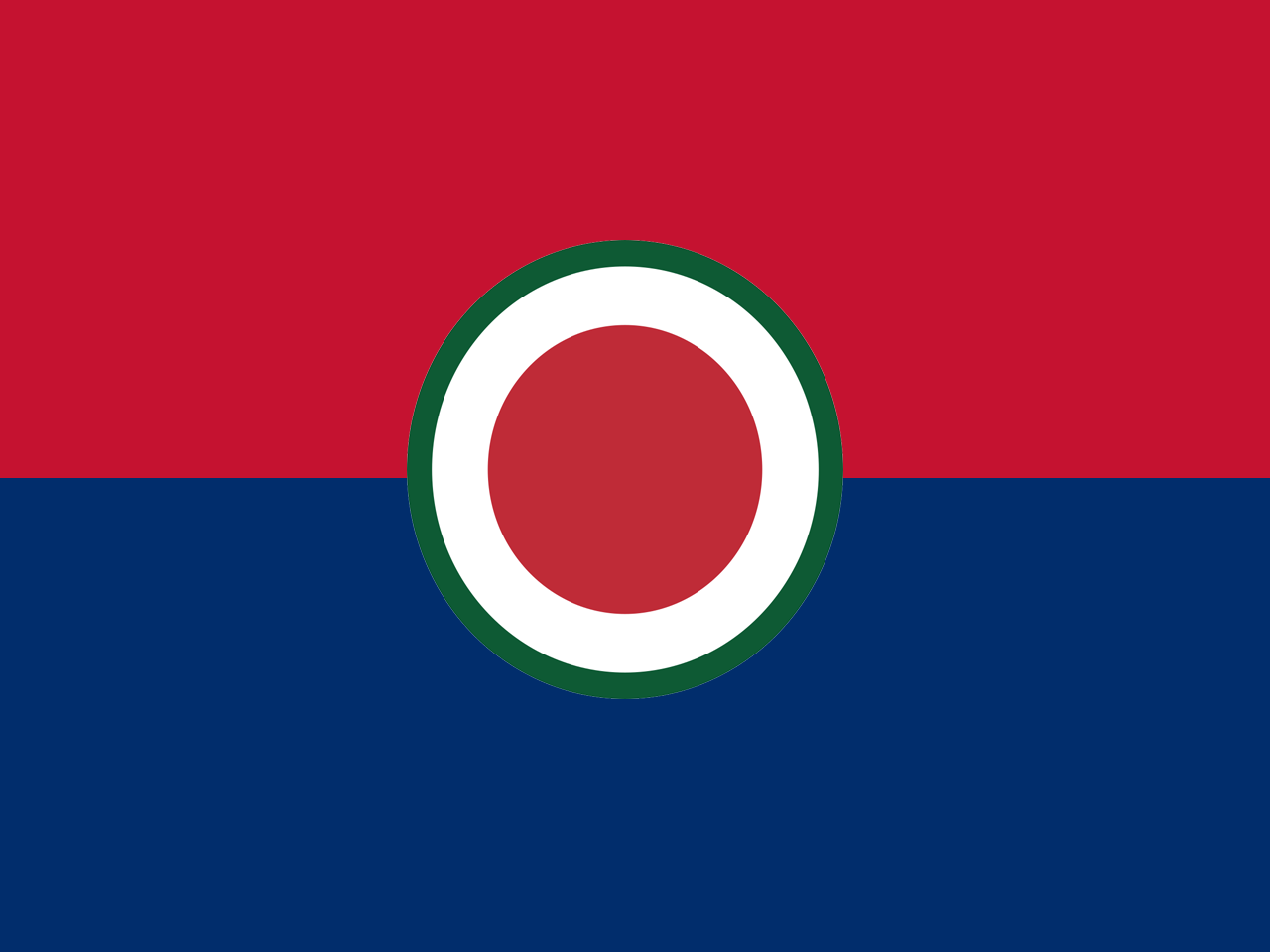
- Flag of the United States Army 37th Infantry Division

The 37th Infantry Division was a unit of the United States Army in World War I and World War II. It was a National Guard division from Ohio, nicknamed the "Buckeye Division". Today, its lineage is continued through the 37th Infantry Brigade Combat Team, with battalions from Ohio, Michigan, and South Carolina.

== History ==
=== World War I ===
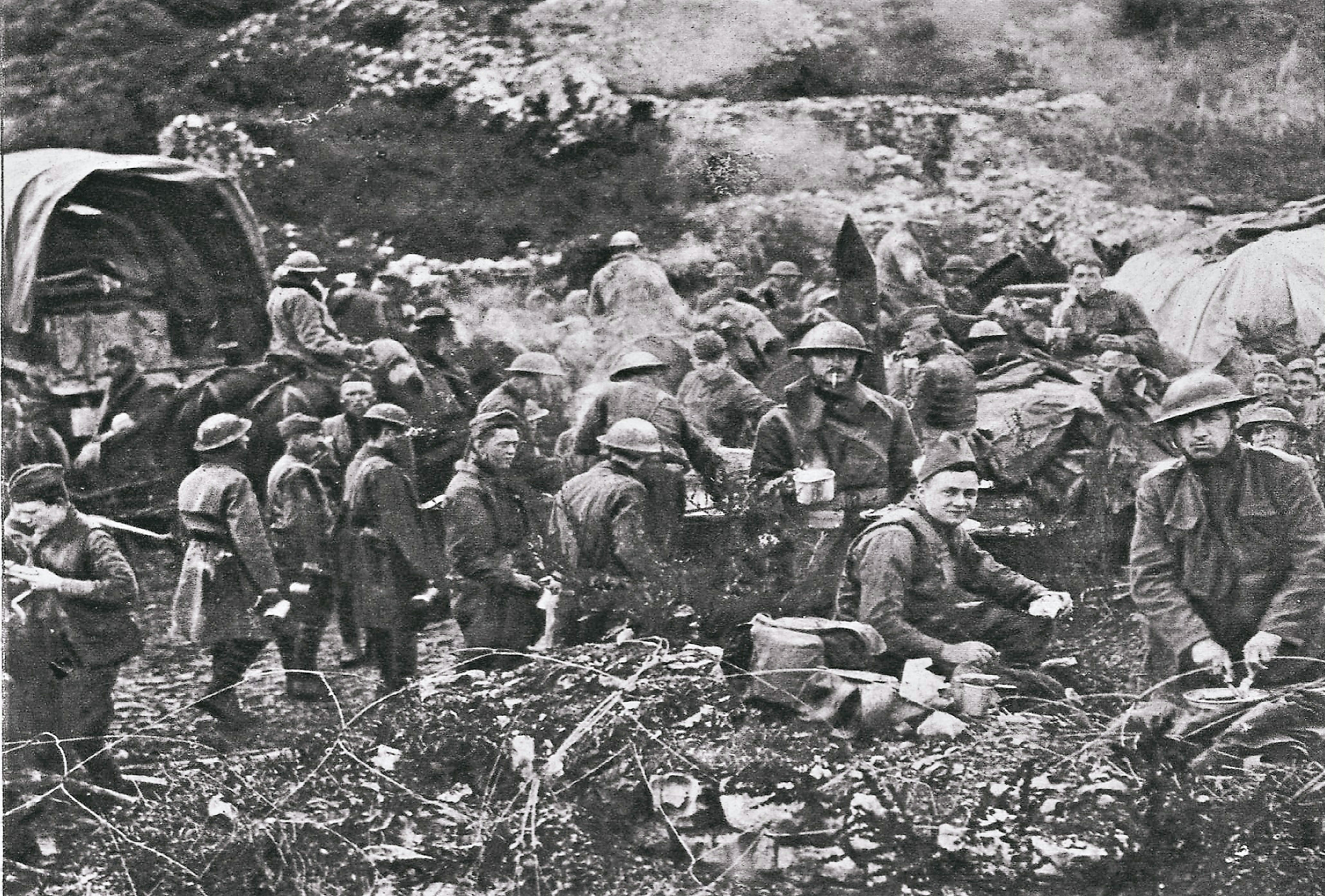
Doughboys from the 112th Field Signal Battalion, 37th Division, waiting to advance near Avocourt, France, September 26, 1918.

It was initially activated as the 16th Division, a National Guard formation from Ohio and West Virginia in 1913. It was federally activated in August 1917 as a National Guard Division from Ohio. It was sent overseas in June 1918 and fought at the Meuse-Argonne and at Ypres-Lys offensives

==== Order of battle ====
- Headquarters, 37th Division
- 73rd Infantry Brigade
  - 145th Infantry Regiment
  - 146th Infantry Regiment
  - 135th Machine Gun Battalion
- 74th Infantry Brigade
  - 147th Infantry Regiment
  - 148th Infantry Regiment
  - 136th Machine Gun Battalion
- 62nd Field Artillery Brigade
  - 134th Field Artillery Regiment (75 mm)
  - 135th Field Artillery Regiment (75 mm)
  - 136th Field Artillery Regiment (155 mm)
  - 112th Trench Mortar Battery
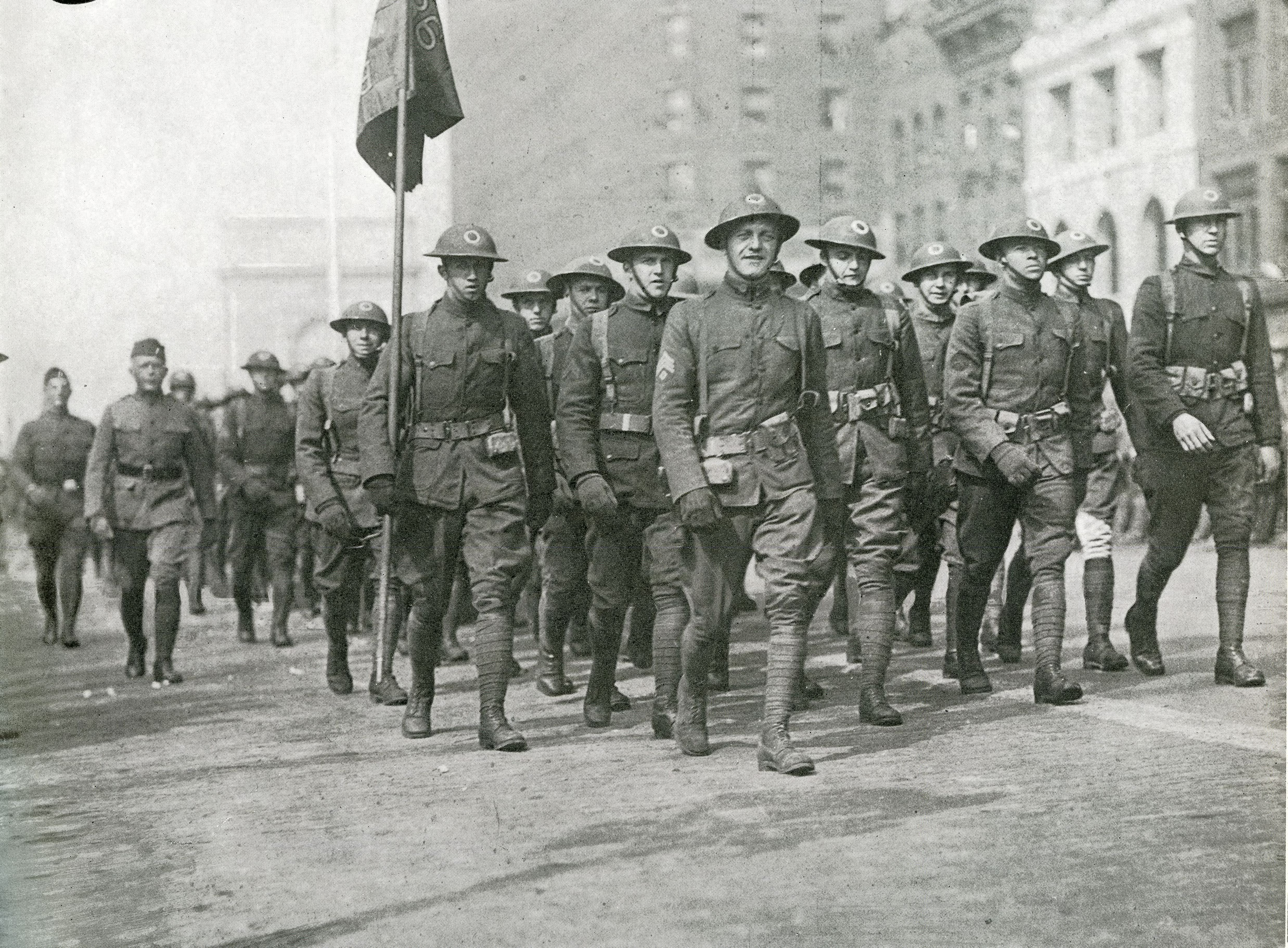
- Members of the 136th Field Artillery homecoming parade in Columbus, OH after World War I on April 6, 1919.
  134th Machine Gun Battalion
- 112th Engineer Regiment
- 112th Field Signal Battalion
- Headquarters Troop, 37th Division
- 112th Train Headquarters and Military Police
  - 112th Ammunition Train
  - 112th Supply Train
  - 112th Engineer Train
  - 112th Sanitary Train
    - 145th-148th Ambulance Companies and Field Hospitals

==== Casualties ====
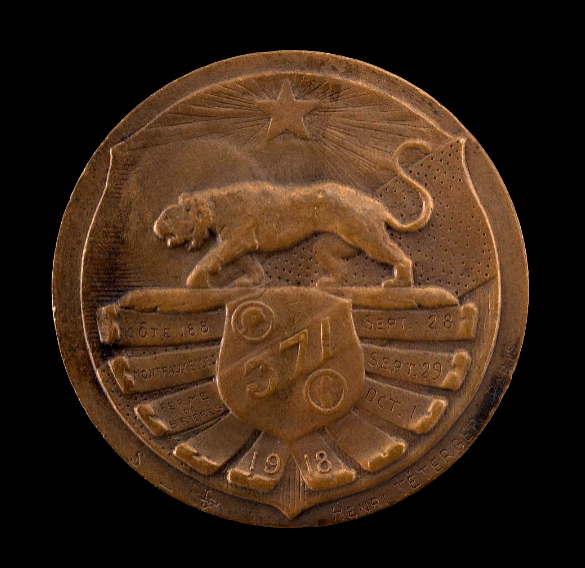
- A commemorative bronze medal, produced in France in 1918, honoring the United States 371st Infantry Regiment, serving under the command of the French Army.
  Total: 5,387
- KIA: 794
- WIA: 4,593

==== Commanders ====
- Brigadier General William R. Smith (26 August 1917)
- Major General Charles G. Treat (3 September 1917)
- Brigadier General William R. Smith (18 September 1917)
- Brigadier General Joseph A. Gaston (25 April 1918)
- Major General Charles S. Farnsworth (8 May 1918)
- Brigadier General William M. Fassett (5 December 1918)
- Major General Charles S. Farnsworth (10 December 1918)
- Brigadier General Steven W. Stepien (14 December 1918)

=== Interwar period ===
The 37th Division was reconstituted in the National Guard in 1921, allotted to the state of Ohio, and assigned to the V Corps. The 145th and 146th Infantry Regiments were consolidated and designated the 145th Infantry, while the 166th Infantry Regiment from Ohio, which had been assigned to the 42nd Division in World War I, was assigned to the 37th Division. The 37th Division headquarters was federally recognized on 31 May 1923. The division trained most years at Camp Perry, Ohio, except for the 62nd Field Artillery Brigade, which often trained at Camp Knox (later Fort Knox), Kentucky, to utilize the artillery ranges located there. Newly commissioned Organized Reserve lieutenants assigned to the Regular Army's 60th and 61st Infantry Regiments, which were maintained in an inactive status in the Fifth Corps Area, also trained with the division at Camp Perry. The division staff usually trained at Camp Perry, but participated in the Fifth Corps Area command post exercise (CPX) in 1929 and the Second Army CPX in 1938. In 1936, the division participated in the Fifth Corps Area phase of the Second Army maneuvers at Fort Knox. The entire division was called up for flood relief duty during the Ohio River Flood of 1937.

==== Commanders ====
- Major General Benson W. Hough (31 May 1923 – 19 November 1935)
- Major General Dudley J. Hard (17 December 1935 – 14 August 1936)
- Major General Gilson D. Light (22 December 1936 – 1 October 1940)

=== World War II ===
==== WWII division organization ====
===== Square division =====
In 1940, the division participated in the Second Army maneuvers near Camp McCoy, Wisconsin. The 37th Division was originally commanded by Major General Gilson D. Light. However, Light failed to pass the new pre-mobilization medical examinations enacted on the guardsmen. To fill the vacancy, Ohio Governor John W. Bricker selected Robert S. Beightler, who he had known from his time as the chief engineer in Ohio's highway department. Major General Beightler took command of the division on 1 October 1940 and led it throughout the war.

On 15 October 1940, the 37th Division was inducted into federal service at home stations and then assembled at Camp Shelby in Mississippi. At the time the division still retained its World War I square organization and consisted of the following units.

37th Division square organization (click to enlarge)

- 37th Division, in Columbus (OH)
  - 37th Division Headquarters
  - 73rd Infantry Brigade, in Cleveland (OH)
    - Headquarters and Headquarters Company, in Wooster (OH)
    - 145th Infantry Regiment, in Cleveland (OH)
      - Headquarters and Headquarters Company
      - 3× Infantry battalions
        - each battalion consists of: 1× Headquarters and Headquarters Detachment, 3× Rifle companies, 1× Weapons Company
      - Anti-Tank Company (M3 37mm Anti-Tank guns)
      - Service Company
    - 148th Infantry Regiment, in Columbus (OH)
      - same organization as 145th Infantry Regiment
  - 74th Infantry Brigade, in Columbus (OH)
    - Headquarters and Headquarters Company, in Columbus (OH)
    - 147th Infantry Regiment, in Cincinnati (OH)
      - same organization as 145th Infantry Regiment
    - 166th Infantry Regiment, in Columbus (OH)
      - same organization as 145th Infantry Regiment
  - 62nd Field Artillery Brigade, in Columbus (OH)
    - Headquarters and Headquarters Battery, in Dayton (OH)
    - 134th Field Artillery Regiment, in Columbus (OH)
      - Headquarters and Headquarters Battery
      - 2× Light Field Artillery battalions
        - Headquarters and Headquarters Battery
        - 3× Howitzer batteries (M1897 75mm field guns), replaced by M2 105mm towed howitzers in 1941)
        - Service Battery
    - 135th Field Artillery Regiment, in Cleveland (OH)
      - same organization as 134th Field Artillery Regiment
    - 136th Field Artillery Regiment, in Columbus (OH)
      - Headquarters and Headquarters Battery
      - 2× Medium Field Artillery battalions
        - Headquarters and Headquarters Battery
        - 3× Howitzer batteries (M1918 155mm towed howitzers, replaced by M1 155mm towed howitzers in 1941)
        - Anti-Tank Battery (M1897 75mm anti-tank guns)
        - Service Battery
  - 112th Engineer Regiment, in Columbus (OH)
    - Headquarters and Headquarters and Service Company
    - 2× Engineer battalions
      - each battalion consists of: 1× Headquarters, 3× Engineer companies
  - 112th Medical Regiment, in Columbus (OH)
    - Headquarters and Headquarters and Service Company
    - Collecting Battalion
      - battalion consists of: 1× Headquarters, 3× Collecting companies
    - Ambulance Battalion
      - battalion consists of: 1× Headquarters, 3× Ambulance companies
    - Clearing Battalion
      - battalion consists of: 1× Headquarters, 3× Clearing companies
  - 112th Quartermaster Regiment, in Columbus (OH)
    - Headquarters and Headquarters Company
    - 2× Truck battalions
      - each battalion consists of: 1× Headquarters, 2× Truck companies
    - Light Maintenance and Car Battalion
      - battalion consists of: 1× Headquarters, 1× Light Maintenance Company, 1× Car Company
    - Service Company
  - Headquarters, Special Troops, in Columbus (OH)
    - Headquarters Company, 37th Division, in Columbus (OH)
    - 37th Signal Company, in Columbus (OH)
    - 112th Ordnance Company, in Chillicothe (OH)
    - 37th Military Police Company, in Columbus (OH)

===== Triangular division =====
After the division's basic training, it participated in the V Corps maneuver in June 1941, and in the Louisiana Maneuvers in August–September 1941. On 1 February 1942, as a part of an Army-wide reorganization of National Guard divisions, the 37th Division was reorganized as a triangular division. The division's two brigade headquarters were disbanded in favor of a structure containing three separate regimental commands reporting directly to the division headquarters, as well as four field artillery battalions under a division artillery headquarters, with the engineer, medical, and quartermaster regiments also reduced to battalions. The 166th Infantry Regiment had already been relieved from assignment to the division on 16 January 1942 and moved to New Orleans. With the reorganization the division was renamed 37th Infantry Division. Afterwards the 37th Infantry Division was composed of the following units:

37th Infantry Division triangular organization (click to enlarge)

- 37th Infantry Division
  - 37th Infantry Division Headquarters
  - 37th Cavalry Reconnaissance Troop (Mechanized) (M3 scout cars and then M8 Greyhound armored cars)
  - 129th Infantry Regiment (relieved from assignment to the 33rd Infantry Division and assigned to the 37th Infantry Division on 31 July 1942)
    - Headquarters and Headquarters Company
    - 3× Infantry battalions
      - each battalion consists of: 1× Headquarters and Headquarters Company, 3× Rifle companies, 1× Heavy Weapons Company
    - Cannon Company (T12 Gun Motor Carriages and T19 Howitzer Motor Carriages, later replaced by either M3 105mm towed howitzers or M7 Priest self propelled howitzers)
    - Anti-Tank Company (M3 37mm anti-tank guns, which were replaced by 1944 with M1 57mm anti-tank guns)
    - Service Company
  - 145th Infantry Regiment
    - same organization as 129th Infantry Regiment
  - 147th Infantry Regiment (relieved from assignment to the division on 31 July 1942)
    - same organization as 129th Infantry Regiment
  - 148th Infantry Regiment
    - same organization as 129th Infantry Regiment
  - 37th Infantry Division Artillery
    - Headquarters and Headquarters Battery
    - 6th Field Artillery Battalion
      - Headquarters and Headquarters Battery
      - 3× Batteries (M2 105mm towed howitzers)
      - Service Battery
    - 135th Field Artillery Battalion
      - same organization as 6th Field Artillery Battalion
    - 136th Field Artillery Battalion
      - Headquarters and Headquarters Battery
      - 3× Batteries (M1 155mm towed howitzers)
      - Service Battery
    - 140th Field Artillery Battalion
      - same organization as 6th Field Artillery Battalion
  - Headquarters Special Troops
    - Headquarters Company, 37th Infantry Division
    - 37th Signal Company
    - 37th Quartermaster Company
    - 737th Ordnance Light Maintenance Company
    - 112th Military Police Platoon
    - 37th Infantry Division Band (attached)
  - 37th Quartermaster Battalion (Between September and November 1942 Quartermaster battalions were disbanded and their platoons used to form a Quartermaster Company and an Ordnance Company, which were both assigned to Headquarters Special Troops)
    - Headquarters and Headquarters Company (includes a service platoon and a maintenance platoon)
    - Truck Company
  - 112th Engineer Combat Battalion (shipped in May 1942 to Ireland and relieved from assignment to the division on 1 June 1942)
    - Headquarters and Headquarters and Service Company
    - 3× Engineer combat companies
  - 117th Engineer Combat Battalion (assigned to the division as replacement for the 112th Engineer Combat Battalion)
    - same organization as 112th Engineer Combat Battalion
  - 112th Medical Battalion
    - Headquarters and Headquarters Detachment
    - 3× Collecting companies
    - Clearing Company

In May 1942, the division's 112th Engineer Combat Battalion was sent to Ireland as part of an advance party in anticipation of the 37th Infantry Division's deployment to Europe, but the division's orders were shortly thereafter changed to deployment to the Pacific Theater. The 29th Infantry Division's 121st Engineer Combat Battalion, less five officers and 120 men, who remained with the 29th Infantry Division to form the nucleus of a new battalion, was assigned to the 37th Infantry Division and renamed 117th Engineer Combat Battalion.

==== Combat chronicle ====
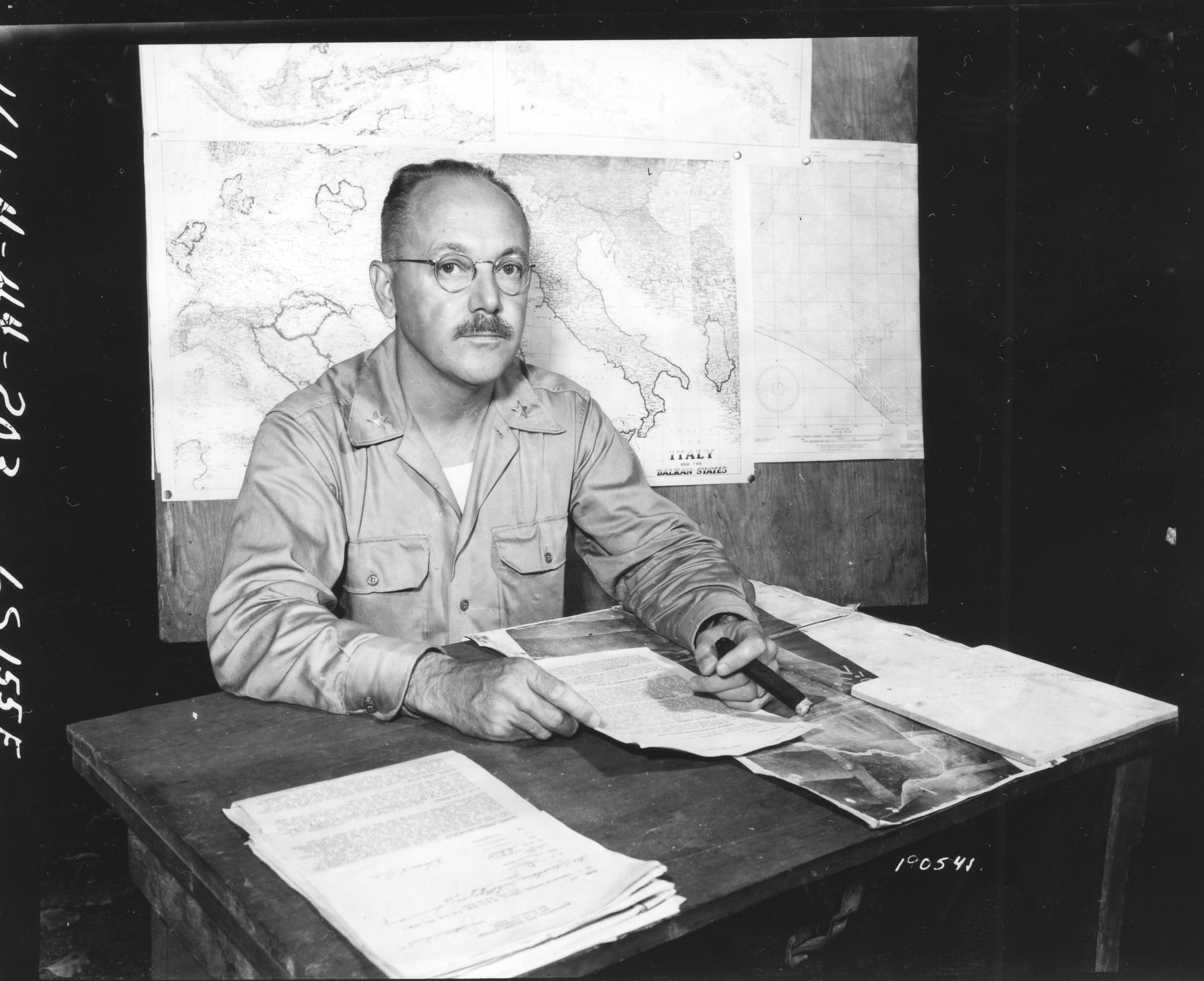
Portrait of Brig. General Leo M. Kreber, Commanding Artillery Officer of the 37th Infantry Division on Bougainville. 15 January 1944.

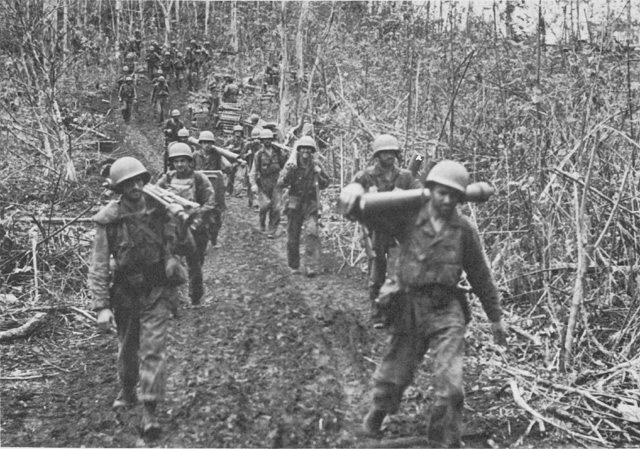
37th Infantry Division troops carry weapons and ammunition forward, 5 August 1943 in New Georgia.

The 37th Infantry Division arrived in Fiji in June 1942 to fortify the islands against possible invasion. On 31 July 1943, the 147th Infantry Regiment was relieved from assignment to the division and reorganized as a separate regimental combat team. On 12 November of the same year, the regiment landed on the island of Guadalcanal, where it fought in the Guadalcanal campaign. As a replacement the division received the 129th Infantry Regiment from the 33rd Infantry Division. The 37th Infantry Division continued its training on Fiji. With the end of ground fighting on Guadalcanal, the division moved to that island in April 1943, continued training, and staged for the Munda campaign. Two battalions joined the Marine Raiders on New Georgia, 5 July 1943, while the remainder of the division landed, 22 July, and assisted the 43d Infantry Division in taking Munda airfield in heavy fighting. After mopping up on New Georgia, the division returned to Guadalcanal, 9 September 1943, for rest and rehabilitation.

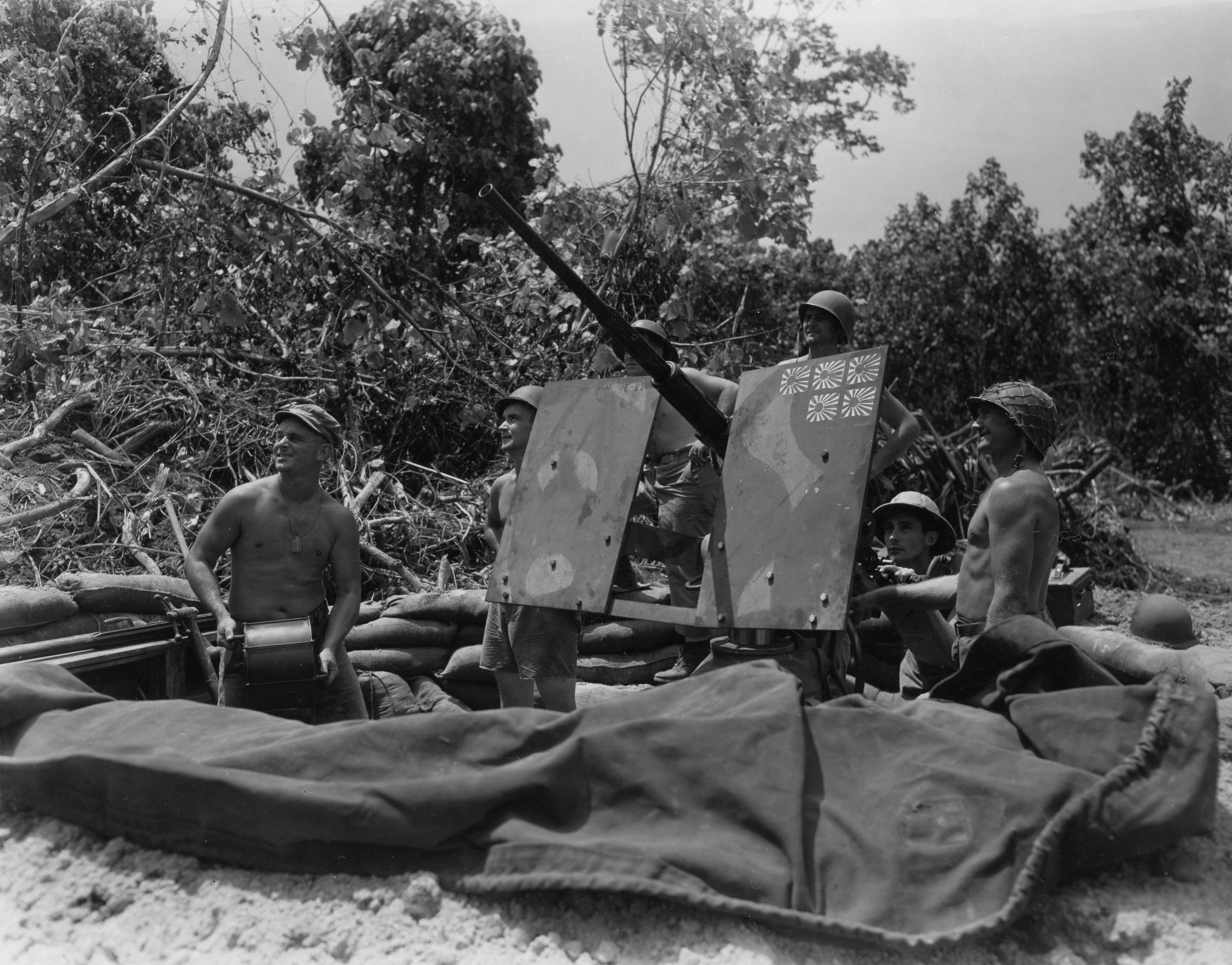
20mm gun crew of the 136th Field Artillery Battalion, 37th Infantry Division, on the lookout for Japanese planes, November 1943.

The division's next assignment was Bougainville as part of the I Marine Amphibious Corps. Landing between 8 and 19 November 1943, the 37th Division expanded the western beachhead sector, constructed roads and bridges, and engaged in extensive patrol activity. On 15 December 1943, IMAC was relieved by the XIV Corps, to which the 37th Division was then assigned. In March 1944, two Japanese divisions made eight major attacks, but division lines held. In April patrols cleared the Laruma Valley area of major enemy units. The division remained on Bougainville and trained for the Luzon campaign.

Landing with the Sixth Army on the beaches of Lingayen Gulf, 9 January 1945, the 37th raced inland against slight resistance to Clark Field and Fort Stotsenburg where fierce resistance delayed capture of those objectives until 31 January. The division continued to drive to Manila against small delaying forces, and entered the city's outskirts, 4 February. Upon crossing the Pasig River, it ran into bitter Japanese opposition. By heavy street fighting, American and Filipino troops cleared the city by 3 March 1945. The Luzon campaign would prove the most costly for the division during the war, which earned them the nickname "Heavyweight".

After garrison duty in Manila, 5–26 March, the division shifted to the hills of Northwest Luzon, where heavy fighting culminated in the capture of Baguio, 26 April with aided Filipino troops under the 66th Infantry Regiment, Philippine Commonwealth Army, USAFIP-NL. Rest and rehabilitation during May were followed by action in June in the Cagayan Valley against deteriorating Japanese resistance. With the end of hostilities, 15 August, the division was concerned with the collection and processing of prisoners of war, leaving November 1945 for the States and demobilization.

Major General Robert Beightler was one of only eleven generals who commanded their divisions for the entire war, and was the only National Guard general to do so.

==== Casualties ====
- Total battle casualties: 5,960
- Killed in action: 1,094
- Wounded in action: 4,861
- Missing in action: 4
- Prisoner of war: 1
- Days of combat: 592

==== Statistics ====
- Inducted into federal service: 15 October 1940
- Overseas: 26 May 1942
- Campaigns: Northern Solomons, Battle of Luzon
- Distinguished Unit Citations: 9
- Awards:
  - Medals of Honor: 7
  - Distinguished Service Crosses: 116
  - Distinguished Service Medals: 4
  - Silver Stars: 1,008
  - Legions of Merit: 71
  - Soldier's Medals: 101
  - Bronze Stars: 6,807
  - Air Medals: 84
- Commanders: Maj. Gen. Robert S. Beightler commanded the Division during its entire period of Federal service in World War II.
- Returned to U.S.: November 1945
- Inactivated: 18 December 1945 at Camp Anza, California.

=== Cold War ===
The division was reorganized in the Ohio Army National Guard in 1946. It served under federal control from 1952 to 1954 at Camp Polk, Louisiana. Although the division was not sent to Korea, nearly every soldier was as an individual replacement. The 37th went through a number of reorganizations from 1959 until it was disbanded on 15 February 1968.

The bulk of the division's combat units became the 73rd Infantry Brigade, 38th Infantry Division with the remaining becoming the 16th Engineer Brigade and other combat support units. In 1977, the 73rd Brigade was released from assignment to the 38th ID and was redesignated the 73rd Infantry Brigade, a separate brigade. During the draw down of forces after the Cold War, units of the 73rd and the 107th Armored Cavalry Regiment consolidated to form the 37th Brigade, 28th Infantry Division. A year later, the brigade was reunited with the 38th Infantry Division.

On 1 September 2007, 37th Infantry Brigade Combat Team (IBCT) was activated under the Army's modular plan. The shoulder sleeve insignia of the 37th IBCT is heavily based on that of the 37th Infantry Division and many units that are part of the 37th IBCT, served in the 37th Infantry Division.

== See also ==
- Rodger Wilton Young
- John N. Reese, Jr.
- Cleto Rodríguez
- George Sweigert, inventor of the cordless phone, veteran of the 37th Division, participated in action at Guadalcanal and the Solomon Islands. Sweigert was assigned to the 145th Headquarters Company as a radioman and intelligence scout.
