= Battle of Piva Forks =

- Part of the Bougainville campaign of the Pacific Theater (World War II)
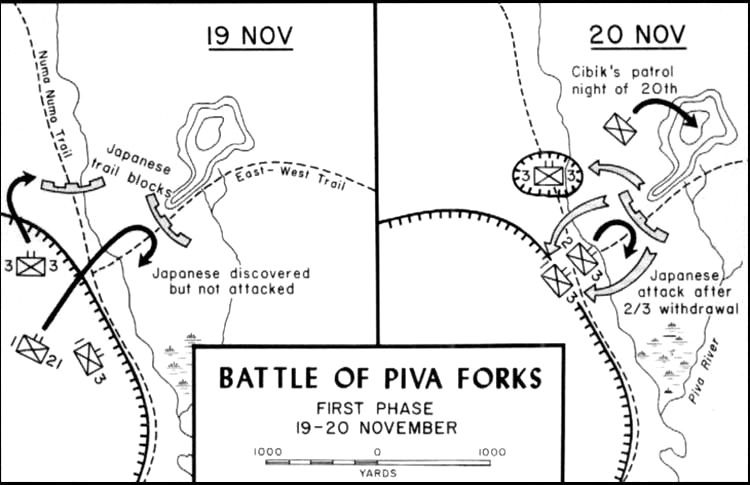
- First phase of the battle
| Date | 18–25 November 1943 |
| Location | Bougainville in the South Pacific |
| Result | American victory |

Belligerents
| United States | Imperial Japan |

Commanders and leaders
| (United States) Roy Geiger (United States) George W. McHenry | (Empire of Japan) Harukichi Hyakutake (Empire of Japan) Masatane Kanda |

Units involved
| 3rd Marine Regiment 9th Marine Regiment; 21st Marine Regiment | 23rd Infantry Regiment |

Casualties and losses
| 115 dead or wounded | 1,071 dead |

The Battle of Piva Forks, also known as the Battle of Numa–Numa Trail, was an engagement that took place during the Bougainville campaign in World War II. Occurring between 18 and 25 November 1943 on Bougainville Island in the South Pacific, the battle involved troops from the United States Marine Corps and the United States Army fighting against Imperial Japanese Army forces and took place amidst the context of the expansion of a beachhead that US forces had established around Torokina on the western side of the island.

In response to the US forward movement, the Japanese placed road blocks along the main axes of advance to delay the Americans; finding their way towards the Piva River checked near the junction of the Numa–Numa and East–West Trails, the US forces sought to remove the obstacles by force. After the initial US attack was repulsed, the Japanese counterattacked before the US Marines overcame this and continued their advance towards two forks in the Piva River. By 26 November the battle had subsided following the capture of a knoll overlooking the East–West Trail by US forces. This represented the last of the significant features west of the Torokina, and the conclusion of the battle marked a temporary end to significant Japanese opposition to the US beachhead around Torokina.

== Background ==
On 1 November 1943, the 3rd Marine Division, under Major General Allen H. Turnage, landed at Cape Torokina near Empress Augusta Bay on the western coast of Bougainville. The landings were undertaken as part of Allied efforts to isolate and reduce the main Japanese base around Rabaul under Operation Cartwheel. On Bougainville, the Marines were opposed by Lieutenant General Harukichi Hyakutake's Japanese 17th Army, which formed part of General Hitoshi Imamura's 8th Area Army, based at Rabaul. The main infantry forces opposing the Marines were the 6th Division, under Lieutenant General Masatane Kanda.

Following the landing, a counter landing by Japanese troops was turned back around Koromokina Lagoon, while an overland assault was turned back along the Piva Trail. After this, the beachhead was slowly expanded by the Marines while work began to construct several airfields, from which airpower would be projected towards Rabaul. After the Battle of the Coconut Grove on 13–14 November, American patrols reported sporadic contacts with Japanese forces. Documents obtained from a Japanese officer who was killed in an ambush provided US forces with details of Japanese dispositions in the area, showing that a roadblock had been set up by elements of the Japanese 23rd Infantry Regiment on both the Numa–Numa and the East–West Trails. General Roy Geiger, commander of I Marine Amphibious Corps, set in place plans for the expansion of the beachhead perimeter that had been established around Torokina to a new defensive line further inland designated as "Easy". Geiger specified that the line was to be obtained by 20 November 1943. On 18 November, US patrols discovered a Japanese roadblock on the Numa–Numa Trail about 1,000 yd (910 m) in front of the beachhead perimeter lines, while another patrol found a roadblock halfway between the two branches of the Piva River along the East–West Trail.

With the roadblocks serving as obstacles to their advance to the Inland Defense Line "Easy", preparations were undertaken by US forces to remove these roadblocks. The 3rd Marine Raider Battalion was attached to Colonel George W. McHenry's 3rd Marine Regiment for the attack on the East–West Trail roadblock, while the 3rd Battalion, 3rd Marines—under the command of Lieutenant Colonel Ralph M. King—was detached to attack the Numa–Numa Trail roadblock.

== Battle ==
On 19 November, the 3rd Battalion, 3rd Marine Regiment—accompanied by light tanks—took up positions in front of the 129th Infantry Regiment. An artillery barrage by the 12th Marine Regiment preceded the attack; after it had ceased the 3rd Battalion, 3rd Marine Regiment flanked the Japanese position, routing the defenders and forcing them out of their positions. Sixteen Japanese dead were found and almost 100 foxholes located; the size of the position indicated that at least a reinforced company had occupied it. After this, a roadblock and a defensive perimeter were established at the junction of the Numa–Numa Trail and the Piva River to defend against a potential Japanese counterattack. Meanwhile, the 1st Battalion, 3rd Marine Regiment and the 1st Battalion, 21st Marine Regiment advanced to the 3rd Battalion, 3rd Marine Regiment roadblock. The 3rd Marine Raiders also moved forward for support and the 2nd Battalion, 3rd Marine Regiment—under the command of Lieutenant Colonel Hector de Zayas—moved behind the Numa–Numa Trail roadblock and was sporadically shelled by the Japanese using 90 mm mortars.

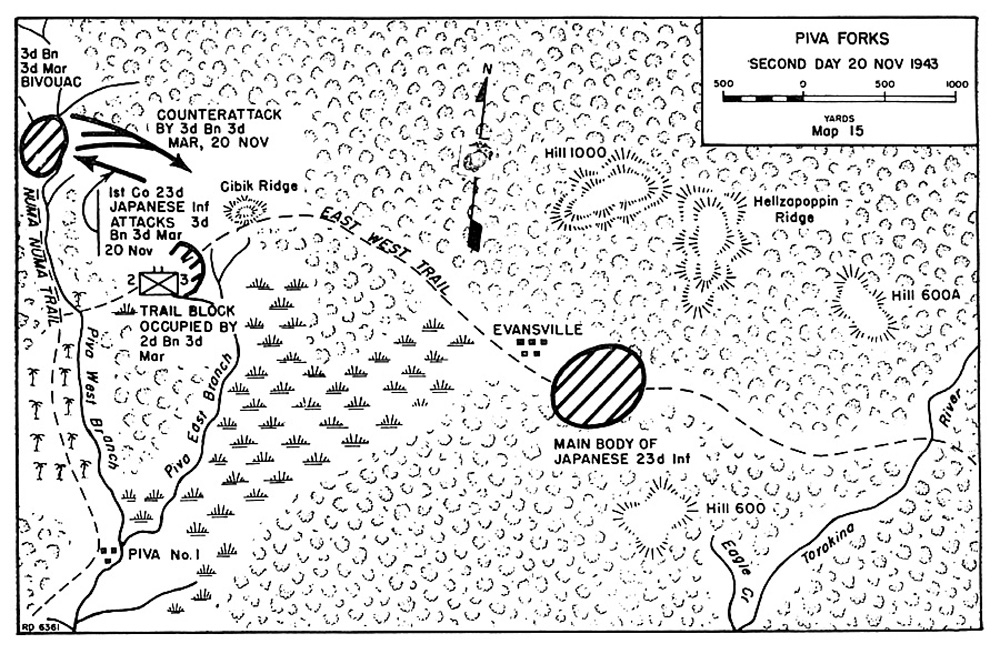
Fighting on the second day, 20 November 1943

On the morning of 20 November, the Japanese counterattacked and attempted to outflank the Marine positions along the Numa–Numa Trail. The attack was driven back, taking up positions and then harassed the Marines with sniper fire and mortar fire. The 3rd Battalion, 3rd Marine Regiment advanced towards the two forks of the Piva River to clear the threat, and two light tanks were disabled during the close fighting along the trail. The 3rd Marine Raiders took up positions to cover the gap between the 129th Infantry Regiment and the 3rd Marine Regiment as the front expanded.

The 2nd Battalion, 3rd Marine Regiment advanced across the west fork of the Piva River to capture the Japanese positions between the two forks of the river. A river crossing was made using a hastily constructed bridge of mahogany, constructed by engineers. Moving forward under light opposition from scattered snipers and several machine gun nests, the enemy outposts were discovered to have been abandoned and had been booby-trapped. The 2nd Battalion, 3rd Marine Regiment set up positions astride the East–West Trail between the two forks of the river. The 21st Marine Regiment took up blocking positions behind the 3rd Marine Regiment.

Late in the afternoon of 20 November, a small, 400 ft (120 m) high ridge (Note: The ridge was later named '"Cibik Ridge" in honor of First Lieutenant Steve J. Cibik, whose platoon held the ridge against repeated Japanese assaults.) was discovered that would provide observation of the entire Empress Augusta Bay area and dominated the East–West Trail and the Piva Forks area. (Note: The Japanese name for the Piva Forks was the "Ake three-forked road", while the East–West Trail was called the "Tozai Trail".) A platoon—under the command of First Lieutenant Steve J. Cibik—was ordered to occupy the ridge with detachments of signals and a section of heavy machine guns. The trek began with a struggle up the steep ridge late in the afternoon, with signal wire being reeled out as the platoon climbed the ridge. Reaching the summit just before sunset, they set about establishing defensive positions, with machine guns sited along likely avenues of attack.

With daybreak on 21 November, it was discovered that the crest of the ridge was a Japanese outpost position, used during the day as an observation post and abandoned at night. Approaching Japanese soldiers who were preparing to take up positions were fired upon, and they withdrew and fled down the hill. The enemy, having regrouped and having been reinforced, launched numerous attacks against Cibik's platoon, which had been reinforced by more machine guns and mortars and was able to hold onto the crest despite fanatical attempts by the Japanese to reoccupy the position.

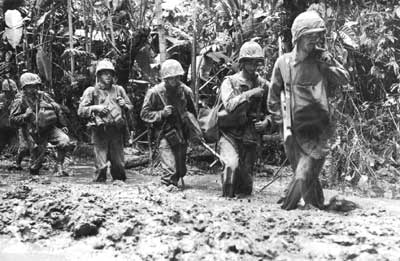
Marines from the 3rd Battalion, 3rd Marines advance through the mud

Geiger's expansion of the beachhead to Inland Defense Line "Easy" began at 07:30 on 21 November, with the gradual widening of the perimeter allowing the 21st Marine Regiment, under the command of Colonel Evans O. Ames, to set up positions between the 3rd Marine Regiment and the 9th Marine Regiment. The 1st Battalion and 3rd Battalion of the 21st Marine Regiment led the way, crossed the Piva River without difficulty and by early afternoon had reached the designated defense line. On the extreme left flank, a reinforced platoon was attacked by a strong Japanese patrol. The platoon was able to repulse the attack with heavy losses to the enemy; documents discovered on a dead Japanese officer provided the Marines with details about the state of Japanese defenses ahead of them.

Resistance to the 3rd Marine Regiment advance was strong, with all three battalions engaged with the Japanese. The 3rd Battalion, 3rd Marine Regiment—having crossed the Piva River without trouble—advanced toward a slight rise, and as the lead scouts came over the top of this ridge, the Japanese opened fire from reverse slope positions. Pinned down, the scouts held their positions while the rest of the battalion moved forward with a strong charge over the ridge and cleared the area of Japanese. 90 mm mortar fire then rained down on the Marines, who sheltered in the foxholes that the Japanese had dug throughout the area. Suffering a number of casualties, the 3rd Battalion, 3rd Marine Regiment established itself in a defensive night position.

The 2nd Battalion, 3rd Marine Regiment made a reconnaissance in force in front of the 1st Battalion, 3rd Marine Regiment positions and came along a strong enemy position, with about 18–20 pillboxes, astride the East–West Trail near the east fork of the river. An attack was launched against the roadblock and managed to pass through the first line of bunkers after heavy fighting at close range but could make no further headway. Company E—attempting to flank the enemy positions to relieve the intense fire directed at Company G—was knocked back by the Japanese defenders. As the Japanese position was set out in depth, de Zayas ordered his men to pull back so that an artillery barrage could be brought down to reduce the Japanese defenses.

The withdrawal was completed despite determined efforts by the Japanese to prevent the disengagement. After the 2nd Battalion, 3rd Marine Regiment had reentered the lines of 1st Battalion, 3rd Marine Regiment, the Japanese attempted a pincer envelopment of the position held by the 1st Battalion, 3rd Marine Regiment, now under the command of Major Charles J. Bailey Jr. The Japanese attacked along the obvious routes of approach down the East–West Trail, and the attack was beaten off by the machine guns sited along this route. One machine gun crew killed 74 out of 75 of the Japanese attackers within 20–30 yards (18–27 m) of the gun. The 1st Battalion, 3rd Marine Regiment then extended to the left toward the ridge occupied by Cibik's platoon.

The 9th Marine Regiment crossed the Piva River took up defensive positions about 1,000 yd (910 m) east of the river, between the 21st Marine Regiment and the beach. The 129th Infantry Regiment also moved forward another 1,000 yd (910 m) unopposed. As a result of inaccurate maps, a gap developed between the 21st Marine Regiment and the 3rd Marine Regiment. At this point, US forces paused in their perimeter expansion of the perimeter as Japanese forces were well dug-in to their front. Plans were drawn up to attack the enemy fortifications, and preparations for the 24 November assault were undertaken. As armor and equipment was moved into positions behind the 3rd Marine Regiment, the roads were extended by engineers and Seabees who advanced them as close to the river forks as possible. Operating under fire from Japanese snipers and mortars, they erected bridges across the river, and large quantities of supplies of ammunition, rations, and medical supplies were sent forward via a relay system to the front lines, while wounded were tended to at a medical station that had been set up close to the end of the road prior to evacuation.

The 2nd Marine Raider Battalion was attached to the 3rd Marine Regiment during 22 November and relieved the 3rd Battalion, 3rd Marine Regiment, which moved into reserve. The 3rd Marine Regiment's positions were: 1st Battalion, 3rd Marine Regiment in front, with 3rd Battalion, 3rd Marine Regiment on the left of the trail and the 2nd Battalion, 3rd Marine Regiment on the right. Cibik's reinforced platoon holding the ridge in front of the perimeter, was reinforced with a company of Marine Raiders and a platoon from the 3rd Marines Weapons Company.

On 23 November, the 12th Marine Regiment's artillery observers moved to the crest of the ridge occupied by Cibik's platoon, in preparation for the attack the next day. As the US artillery and mortars were registered in the area in front of their position, the Marines on the front lines used colored smoke grenades to mark their positions. The Japanese, however, were using the same colors to mark US positions and, as a result the Japanese artillery were able to range in on the forward Marine positions with several rounds. Japanese long-range guns also shelled Torokina Airfield and Landing Ship Tanks that were unloading near Cape Torokina. In response, US forward artillery observers coordinated fire missions against several positions where they believed that the Japanese guns might be located, and shortly after this the firing ceased. Nevertheless, the Japanese artillery fire worried US commanders who were already concerned about reports that the size of Japanese forces defending the area around the village of Kogubikopai-ai was between 1,200 and 1,500.

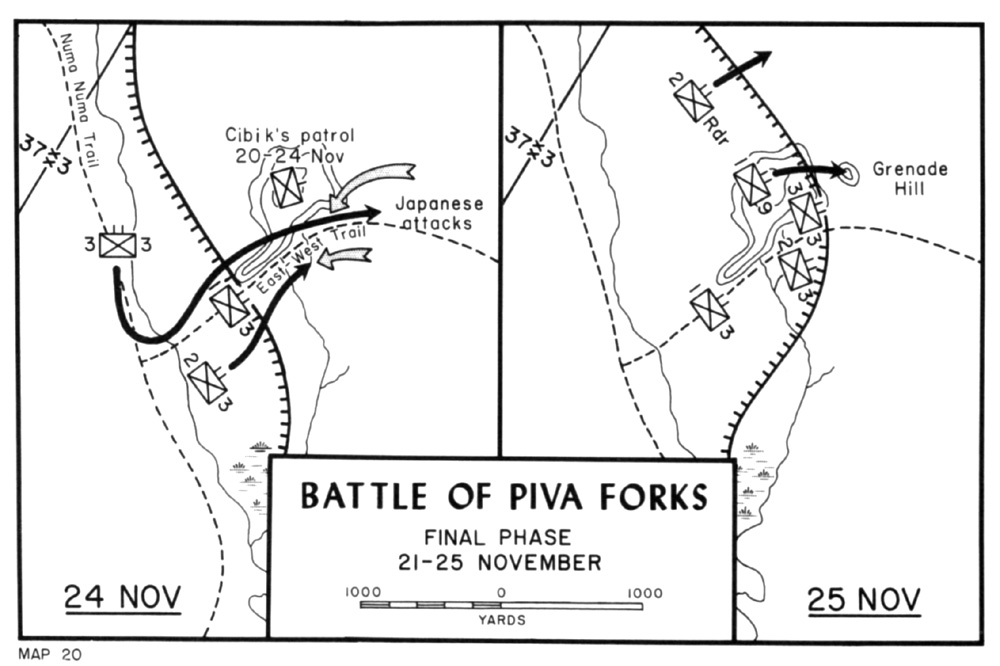
Final phase of the battle

At 08:35 on 24 November, the seven battalions of the artillery group opened fire on the Japanese positions in front of the 3rd Marine Regiment. The roar of the cannon fire and the sharp blasts of the explosions in the jungle ahead merged into a near-deafening thunder for more than 20 minutes, with more than 5,600 shells from 75 mm and 105 mm howitzers fired at the Japanese positions. Smoke shells were also fired into the hills east of the Torokina River to reduce the ability of the Japanese to observe the Marine positions.

The 2nd Battalion, 3rd Marine Regiment and 3rd Battalion, 3rd Marine Regiment began moving forward to the front line in preparation of the launch of the attack. Tanks moved toward the front lines into support positions. Before 09:00, the 1st Battalion, 3rd Marine Regiment opened up with close-in mortar concentrations and sustained machine gun fire to prevent the Japanese from seeking protection next to the Marine lines. Just before the attack commenced, Japanese artillery began a counterbarrage which blasted the Marine lines, pounding the 1st Battalion, 3rd Marine Regiment positions and the assembly areas of the assault battalions, with the extremely accurate fire threatening to force a halt to the attack plans. The forward observers on the ridge were utilized to discover the location of the Japanese battery and counterbattery fire. Communications were lost, but the break in the signal wire was found and repaired.

The enemy battery was located on the forward slope of a small coconut grove several thousand yards from the Piva River. Counterbattery fire from the 155 mm howitzer battery of the U.S. Army's 37th Division began to explode around the grove. Fire was adjusted quickly by direct observation, and shortly afterwards the Japanese battery was knocked out of action. While the artillery duel was underway, the 2nd Battalion, 3rd Marine Regiment and 3rd Battalion, 3rd Marine Regiment began forming into attack formation behind the line of departure. The preparatory fires ceased at 09:00, and at that time the two attack battalions advanced through the 1st Battalion, 3rd Marine Regiment's lines.

Moving through the artillery preparation zone, it was obvious that the forward Japanese positions had been neutralized. The shattered and cratered jungle with destroyed Japanese defensive positions was passed without opposition. Shredded and torn bodies of dead Japanese gave evidence of the impact of artillery fire. Dead enemy snipers—lashed into positions in tree tops—draped from shattered branches. Soon afterward, the lull subsided and the surviving Japanese opened fire. Japanese artillery burst along the line, traversing the front of the advancing Marines together with extremely accurate 90 mm mortar fire hit the attacking companies and caused significant casualties.

The 2nd Battalion, 3rd Marine Regiment suffered 70 casualties in moving only 250 yd (230 m). During the morning, the Marines were forced to undertake eight water crossings of the same stream as it zigzagged across their axis of advance. At each bend in the stream, the Japanese had established a number of pillboxes which were set out in triangular formation; before the Americans could advance they had to neutralize each of these. Flame throwers, which had been brought up by engineers attached to the assault companies, were employed in this task. The Japanese—aware of the capabilities of the flame throwers—concentrated their fire on the engineers, inflicting heavy casualties upon them as they attempted to get close enough to direct the flame into the bunkers.

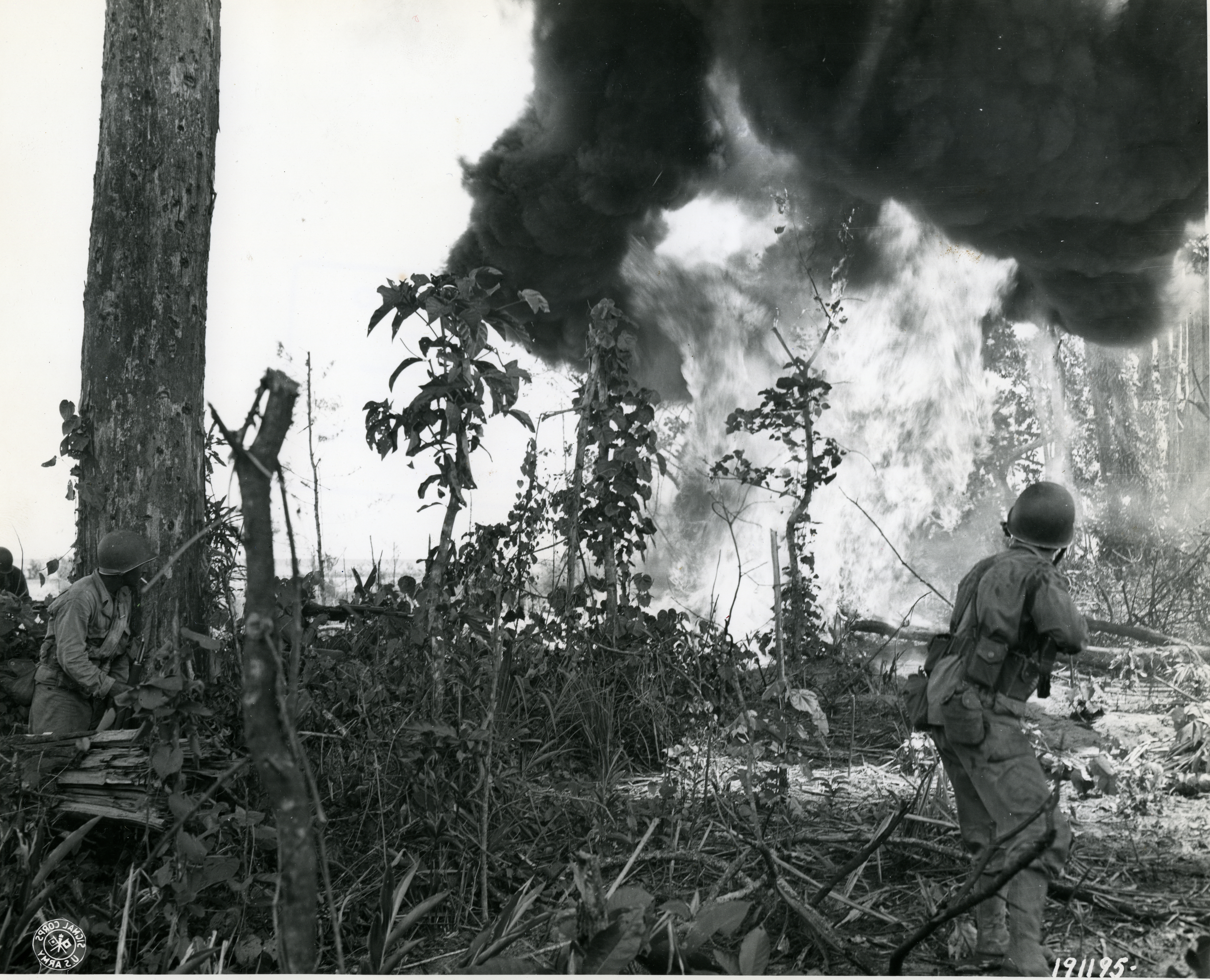
A US flamethrower team assaults a Japanese pillbox

Advancing to the left of the East–West Trail, the 3rd Battalion, 3rd Marine Regiment encountered less resistance and was able to continue its advance without pause. The dazed and shocked survivors of the bombardment were killed before the Japanese could recover from the effects of the artillery fire. The 3rd Battalion, 3rd Marine Regiment had moved nearly 500 yd (460 m) before the Japanese could organize a desperate counterattack which was repelled. Without stopping, the 3rd Battalion, 3rd Marine Regiment went straight through the enemy flanking attempt and fought a violent hand-to-hand and tree-to-tree struggle that completely destroyed the Japanese force.

By 12:00, the initial objectives had been reached, and the attack was held up to allow reorganization and to reestablish contact between units. After a short time, the attack started forward again toward the final objective some 400 yd (370 m) farther on. A further artillery barrage was called down in front of the advancing Marines and 81 mm mortars covered the advance. As this movement began again, the Japanese called in their own mortars to seek out the American crews; the infantry attack continued, while overhead supporting and defensive fire was exchanged.

The 3rd Battalion, 3rd Marine Regiment came under fire from Japanese machine gun and rifle fire from positions on high ground bordering a swampy area raked through the battalion, forcing them to seek cover in the knee deep mud and slime. Company L—on the extreme left—was under heavy fire and was reinforced quickly with a platoon from the reserve unit, Company K. Company L managed to fight its way through heavy enemy fire to the foot of a small knoll. Company I—with the battalion command group attached—was diverted to help, and together they were able to rush and capture the rising ground. After the Japanese were cleared from the position, the battalion established a defensive perimeter and waited for 2nd Battalion, 3rd Marine Regiment to move into position beside them.

The 2nd Battalion, 3rd Marine Regiment's advance was slowed by strong Japanese reinforcements as it closed in on the objective. Calling down 60 mm and 81 mm mortar fire in front of their positions, the Marines regained the initiative and moved forward. Although the remaining Japanese made a determined final stand on the objective, the Marines were able to push ahead, and as the resistance subsided the battalion "mopped up" before establishing a defensive night position. In the US rear area, behind the 2nd Battalion, 3rd Marine Regiment and 3rd Battalion, 3rd Marine Regiment, sporadic fighting continued during the night as small pockets of Japanese troops, which had been bypassed during the US assault, attacked the Marines' supply lines, ambushing stretcher bearers and troops bringing up ammunition.

== Aftermath ==
The advance to inland defense line "Easy" had been carried out successfully by the US forces. Casualties during the battle reflected the intensity with at least 1,071 Japanese killed while the Marines' casualties were 115 dead and wounded. Such was the intensity of the fighting that the Japanese 23rd Infantry Regiment was almost completely destroyed. First Lieutenant Steve J. Cibik was awarded the Silver Star for his leadership in defending the ridge over four days. Corporal John Logan Jr. and Captain Robert Turnbull were both awarded the Navy Cross posthumously. Such was the intensity of the fighting that during the attack on 24 November, the supporting US artillery fired a total 62 different fire missions including the opening bombardment of the attack. Of these, a total of 52 were in general support of the Marines, while a further nine were fired to support the 37th Division that was also expanding its perimeter. Throughout these missions, over 7,300 rounds were fired: this was made up of 4,131 rounds of 75 mm, 2,534 rounds of 105 mm, and 688 rounds of 155 mm ammunition.

As 24 November was Thanksgiving Day, a large number of turkeys were received at the beachhead, and the division cooks roasted the entire shipment and packed the turkeys for distribution to front line units. The 3rd Marines, exhausted from the fighting and below establishment from casualties and disease, were relieved the following day by the three battalions of the 9th Marine Regiment. Meanwhile, the US advance continued throughout the day until they met heavy Japanese resistance at a knoll dubbed "Grenade Hill", which was eventually captured by mid-morning on 26 November. Over the course of 25–26 November fighting around the knoll resulted in a further 32 Japanese killed, while US casualties amounted to five killed and 42 wounded.

By the conclusion of the Piva Forks fighting, US forces were in control of the majority of the key terrain and high features that existed west of the Torokina River. These reduced the Japanese force's ability to harass the US beachhead around Torokina, and as a result although the fighting on Bougainville continued with notable actions being fought at Koiari and Hellzapoppin Ridge and Hill 600A, in the words of historian Samuel Morison, "the Battle of Piva Forks...was the last serious ground resistance for a long time". Indeed, it was not until March 1944 that the Japanese were able to make any real attempt at counterattacking when they launched a large-scale offensive on the American perimeter with 15,000 troops drawn from the 6th and 17th Divisions who attacked north and west from Buin and Numa–Numa.

== Bibliography ==
- Chapin, John C. (1997). Top of the Ladder: Marine Operations in the Northern Solomons. Washington, DC: Marine Corps History and Museums Division. OCLC 38258412.
- Miller, John Jr. (1959). Cartwheel: The Reduction of Rabaul. United States Army in World War II: The War in the Pacific. Office of the Chief of Military History, U.S. Department of the Army. OCLC 63151382.
- Morison, Samuel Eliot (1975) [1958]. Breaking the Bismarcks Barrier. History of United States Naval Operations in World War II. Vol. VI. Edison, New Jersey: Castle Books. ISBN 978-0-7858-1307-1.
- Rentz, John M. (1946). Bougainville and the Northern Solomons. Washington, DC: Historical Branch, Headquarters, United States Marine Corps. OCLC 1313812.
- Shaw, Henry I.; Kane, Douglas T. (1963). Isolation of Rabaul. History of U.S. Marine Corps Operations in World War II. Vol. II. Washington, DC: Historical Branch, Headquarters, United States Marine Corps. OCLC 568751111.
- Tanaka, Kengoro (1980). Operations of the Imperial Japanese Armed Forces in the Papua New Guinea Theater During World War II. Tokyo, Japan: Japan Papua New Guinea Goodwill Society. OCLC 9206229.
