= Bougainville counterattack =

1944 Japanese offensive in World War II

- Part of the Bougainville campaign of the Pacific Theater (World War II)
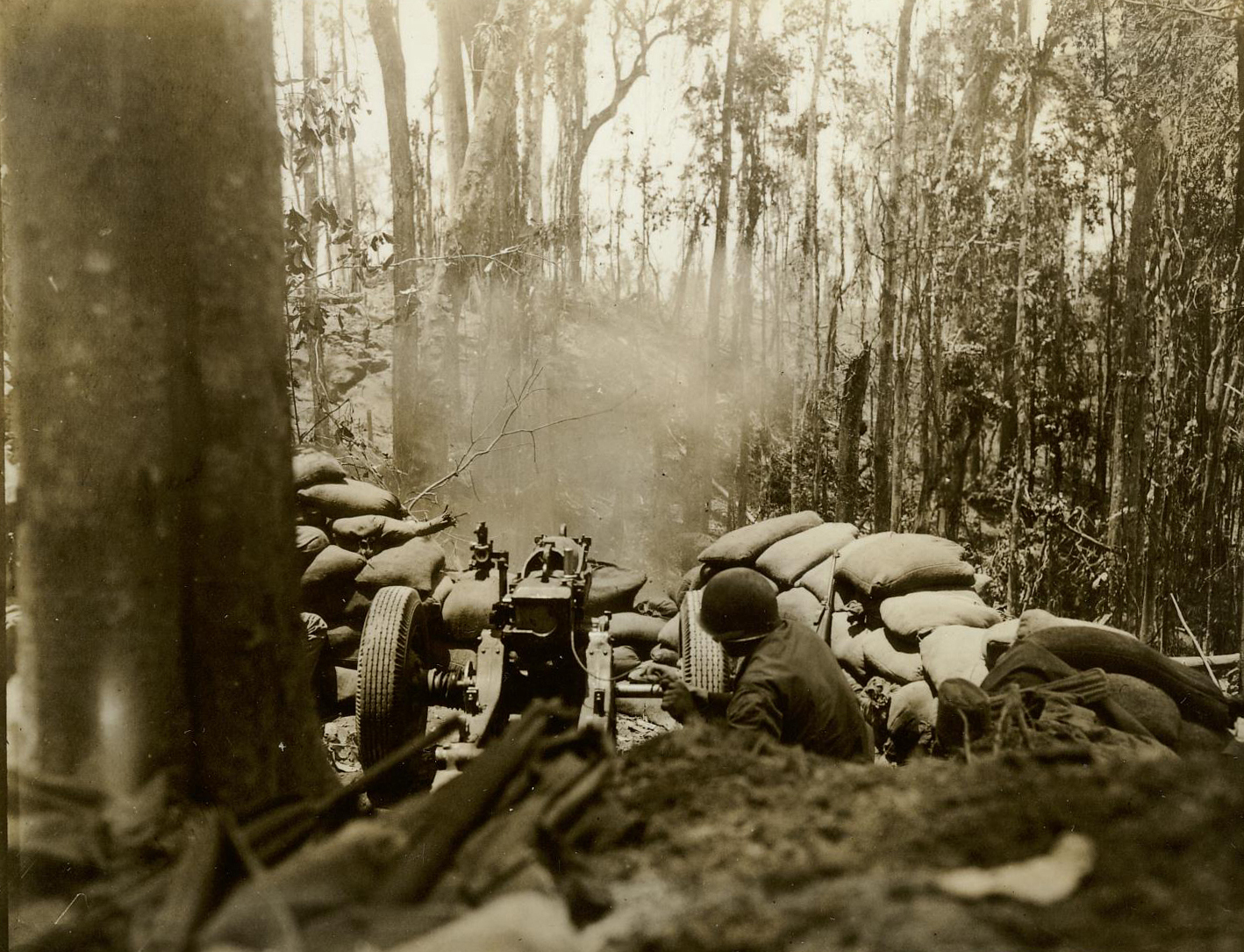
- A U.S. Army 75 mm pack howitzer firing at close range at a Japanese position on Hill 260 in March 1944
Date	8–25 March 1944
Location	Bougainville Island 06°11′24″S 155°04′48″E
Result	Allied victory

Belligerents
Japan	United States; Fiji; New Zealand

Commanders and leaders
(Empire of Japan) Harukichi Hyakutake	(United States) Oscar Griswold

Units involved
(Empire of Japan) 17th Army	(United States) XIV Corps

Strength
15,400–19,000 men	62,000 men

Casualties and losses
At least 3,500 killed; 5,500 wounded	263 killed
- Location within Papua New Guinea

The Bougainville counterattack, also known as the Second Battle of Torokina, was an unsuccessful Japanese offensive against the Allied base at Cape Torokina on Bougainville Island in the Pacific Theater of World War II. The Japanese attack began on 8 March 1944 after months of preparation and was repulsed by United States Army forces in fighting which lasted until 25 March. The attack was hampered by inaccurate intelligence and poor planning and was pushed back by the well-prepared Allied defenders, who greatly outnumbered the Japanese force. The Japanese suffered severe casualties, while Allied losses were light.

The goal of the offensive was to destroy the Allied beachhead, which accommodated three strategically important airfields. The Japanese mistakenly believed that their forces were about as large as the units deployed to defend the Allied positions. The Allies detected Japanese preparations for the attack shortly after they began in early 1944 and strengthened the base's defenses. None of the three Japanese forces which conducted the attack was able to penetrate far into the Allied perimeter, although there was intense fighting for several positions.

The Bougainville counterattack was the last major Japanese offensive in the Solomon Islands campaign. Following the engagement the Japanese force withdrew from the Empress Augusta Bay area, and only limited fighting took place until late 1944, when Australian troops took over from the Americans and began a series of advances across the island until the end of the war in August 1945.

== Background ==
Bougainville Island lies at the northwestern end of the Solomon Islands archipelago. The island is 125 mi (201 km) long and 38 mi (61 km) wide at its broadest point. The island is roughly shaped like a fiddle. The interior of Bougainville is dominated by two ranges of mountains that are covered with montane rainforests. The coastal plains are swampy and largely covered with mangroves and lowland rainforests. Bougainville has a tropical climate with heavy rain being common at all times of the year, producing the Solomon Islands rain forests ecoregion. There were two active volcanoes. At the time of World War II, most of Bougainville's population of about 50,000 lived in small settlements in the north of the island and along its northeastern coast. The area in and around the American perimeter in March 1944 was lightly populated. There were no formed roads, although a track ran along the coast and another crossed the interior.

At the outbreak of the Pacific War, Bougainville formed part of the Australian-administrated Mandated Territory of New Guinea. The small number of Australian public servants and plantation managers on Bougainville fled the island in January 1942, and it came under Japanese control that March. Few Japanese troops arrived until 1943, when the island's garrison was expanded to a peak strength of 65,000. After their arrival, the Japanese conscripted some of the locals to work as laborers. Conditions were harsh and often they were not paid. As the Allied bombing campaign in the Pacific intensified throughout 1943, the conditions imposed on the locals grew more harsh as food supplies dwindled and instances of disease grew.

The Bougainville campaign began on 1 November 1943 when the United States I Marine Amphibious Corps landed at Cape Torokina, around Empress Augusta Bay on the west coast of the Japanese-held island. The Allied invasion aimed to establish a defensive perimeter around Cape Torokina within which airfields would be built to attack the major Japanese base at Rabaul and support other operations in the region. The Allies did not intend to conquer the entire island, and the invasion area was mainly selected on the grounds that it was lightly defended and distant from the main Japanese bases at the northern and southern ends of Bougainville.

In addition to the advantages to be gained from distance from the Japanese bases, the American planners judged that a beachhead in the Cape Torokina area would be defensible. The U.S. Marine Corps official history of the fighting on the island states that "the Cape Torokina plain, bordered by the natural obstacles of the Laruma River to the northwest, the mountains inland, and the Torokina River to the southeast, fell into an ideal defensive area about 6 mi (9.7 km) deep and 8 mi (13 km) long which could be defended by the Allied forces then available". The planners judged that any force large enough to pose a threat to the beachhead would need at least three months to reach the area by travelling overland from the Japanese bases. While a Japanese counter-landing could potentially deposit a large force in the Cape Torokina area, the United States Navy was confident that it could stop any such operation.

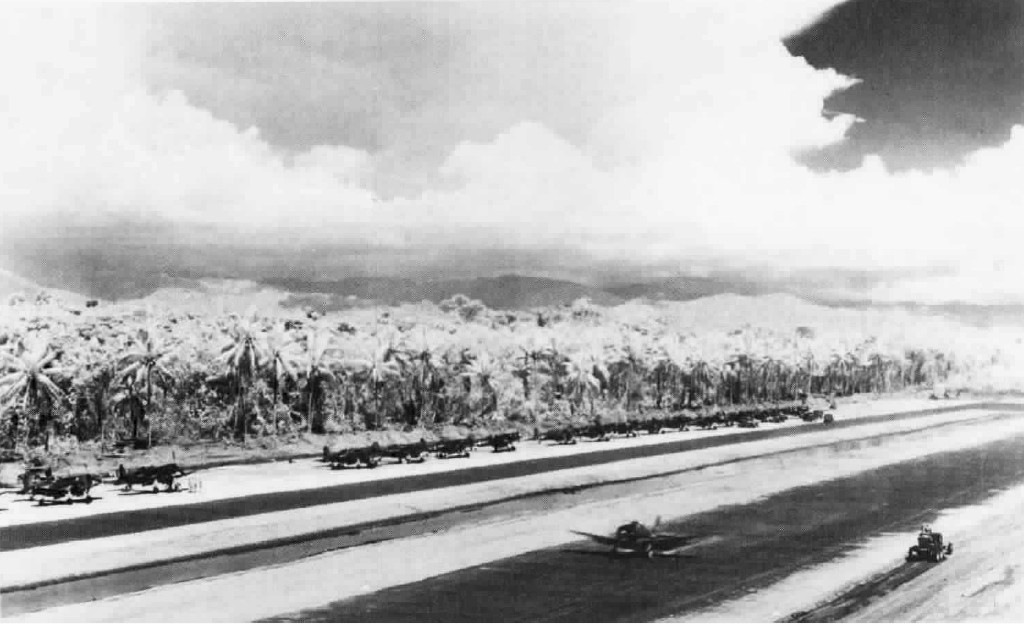
U.S. Marine Corps fighters and bombers at Torokina Airfield, December 1943

The Japanese commander on Bougainville, Lieutenant General Harukichi Hyakutake, initially believed that the landing at Empress Augusta Bay was a diversion and would be followed by a direct assault on the south of the island. However, he conducted several small and unsuccessful attacks against the beachhead in early November after being ordered to do so by the Eighth Area Army, his superior headquarters. These involved units from Hyakutake's 17th Army and forces dispatched directly from Rabaul. After these attacks were defeated, a local counterattack with four battalions was planned for 22 November, but this plan was scrapped by the Eighth Area Army. The United States forces subsequently expanded their beachhead and defeated the Japanese in the area in a series of battles in November and December. Most of the Japanese units involved in these engagements were destroyed, but the casualties inflicted on the 17th Army were not crippling; the Americans captured 25 prisoners and a small amount of equipment and estimated that over 2,458 Japanese had been killed.

After pushing the Japanese back, the American forces began work on building defense lines to protect the airfield complex in late November. These defenses were completed by 15 December and comprised trenches, foxholes and fortified emplacements for machine guns and artillery. Barbed wire was strung along the 22,500 yd (20,600 m) horseshoe-shaped perimeter, and fields of fire were cleared 100 yd (91 m) ahead of all positions. All trails leading to the area were blocked with obstacles, and land mines were placed on other routes which might be used by the Japanese. Artillery and mortars were emplaced in positions where they could support any part of the defensive perimeter, and fire plans were developed to allow for rapid bombardments of all possible approach routes. Several searchlights were also deployed to illuminate the front lines. An outpost was established around Ibu, to the north of the perimeter, for early warning. The U.S. Army's official history of operations on Bougainville describes the American defenses as "formidable".

The construction of several airfields within the perimeter at Empress Augusta Bay began shortly after the landing. This work was conducted by eight United States Navy Seabee battalions and a brigade of engineers from New Zealand. An airfield capable of supporting fighters opened at Cape Torokina on 9 December, and a squadron of U.S. Marine Corps fighters began operating from it the next day. Two airfields capable of accommodating large numbers of light and medium bombers were subsequently completed: Piva Uncle on 30 December and Piva Yoke on 9 January 1944. These were the closest Allied airfields to Rabaul and were used to greatly intensify the air campaign against the Japanese positions there. The Japanese air units stationed at Rabaul were worn down by frequent Allied aerial raids during early 1944, and the Japanese high command decided to withdraw them following a major attack on the key base at Truk in mid-February. This gave the Allies complete air superiority over the region.

== Prelude ==
=== Preparations ===
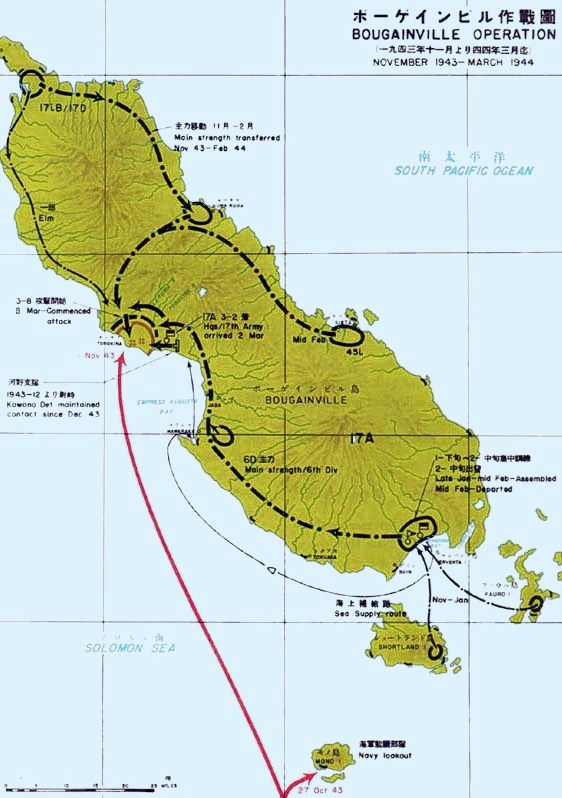
Map of Japanese troop movements on Bougainville during the fighting on the island between November 1943 and March 1944. The black lines indicate Japanese movements, the red lines indicate Allied landing operations.

In late December 1943 Hyakutake and the other senior Japanese officers on Bougainville concluded that the Allies did not intend to advance from their perimeter at Empress Augusta Bay or land elsewhere on the island, and they began planning a counterattack. Their plans were based around a mistaken assessment that there were 30,000 Allied personnel on the island, of whom 20,000 were combat troops with the remainder aircraft ground crews; the American combat strength was actually over 60,000. As a result of its experiences in the Guadalcanal campaign during 1942 and 1943, the 17th Army decided to conduct a single major attack against the perimeter rather than a series of offensives. During a visit to Bougainville on 21 January 1944, General Hitoshi Imamura, the commander of the Eighth Area Army, directed that the offensive should be launched in early March. Japanese historian Hiroyuki Shindo states that this date was chosen solely based on ration availability; the Japanese supply line from Rabaul had been cut when the Allies had captured the Green Islands in mid-February, and Japanese commanders wanted to attack before supplies were exhausted.

Preparations for the counterattack were made during the first months of 1944. As the bulk of the 17th Army was stationed in northern and southern Bougainville, engineers needed to develop roads and bridges to allow the troops to move to the hills inland from the American perimeter. The combat troops chosen for the attack spent 40 days throughout January and into February conducting unit level training, perfecting jungle assault techniques. All of the units selected for the offensive departed their bases by mid-February and advanced along the eastern and western coasts. Barges moved artillery, other equipment and 1,400 soldiers to a point east of Cape Torokina, around the Jaba–Mosigeta area; the guns and supplies were then carried overland into the hills. Only two weeks worth of rations were assembled, although Japanese planners believed these provisions would be sufficient to sustain 12,000 men for about one month.

The Allied force on Bougainville detected the Japanese buildup. Information on the movement of the 17th Army was gained from many sources, including signals intelligence, patrols conducted by U.S. Army troops into the interior of the island, aerial and naval patrols, and the interrogation of Japanese prisoners. Japanese troops were also detected around the outpost at Ibu, which was held by the 1st Fiji Battalion. In response, Allied aircraft attacked bridges and areas in which Japanese troops were believed to be located. PT boats and Landing Craft Infantry gunboats supported by PBY Catalina aircraft patrolled the coast of Bougainville and attacked Japanese barges but were unable to stop the movement of supplies and equipment by sea. American warships and aircraft also periodically bombarded the main Japanese bases on Bougainville.

Several small clashes were fought between Allied and Japanese forces during February. The Fijian force at Ibu was reinforced to a strength of about 400 personnel on 3 February but was withdrawn to the perimeter in the middle of the month after a larger body of Japanese troops surrounded the outpost and began to attack the U.S. Army units which were protecting its supply lines. All of the Fijian troops, along with 200 Bougainvillean civilians who had chosen to evacuate with them, reached the coast on 19 February. Other American patrols and positions to the north and northeast of the perimeter were also attacked, and the Allies concluded that the Japanese force was being concentrated in this area. Papers taken from the bodies of Japanese soldiers killed in this fighting also allowed the Allies to build up an accurate appreciation of the Japanese plan of attack as well as the order of battle of the forces involved. Intelligence information detailing the Japanese plans was then distributed to American soldiers holding the perimeter through various means, including notices posted on unit bulletin boards.

=== Opposing forces ===
The Japanese force was drawn primarily from Lieutenant General Masatane Kanda's 6th Division, a veteran formation that had seen action previously in China, although there were also elements (two battalions) of the 17th Division. These troops were divided into three separate groups, each named for its commander, as well as an artillery group and a reserve force. Major General Shun Iwasa commanded the Iwasa Unit, which comprised the 23rd Infantry Regiment, the 2nd Battalion of the 13th Infantry Regiment, and two batteries of artillery, as well as engineers and other support troops. The Magata Unit was commanded by Colonel Magata Isaoshi and was made up of the 45th Infantry Regiment along with supporting artillery, mortars and engineers. Colonel Muda Toyoharei led the Muda Unit, which comprised the 1st and 3rd Battalions of the 13th Infantry Regiment and some engineers. The 17th Army Artillery Group was commanded by Colonel Saito and was equipped with four 15 cm (5.9 in) howitzers, two 10 cm (3.9 in) howitzers, eighteen 7 cm (2.8 in) infantry guns and a large number of 7.5 cm (3.0 in) mountain guns; an American post-battle account states that the group had 168 of these weapons. The 17th Army's reserve comprised part of the 1st and 3rd Battalions of the 53rd Infantry Regiment as well as elements of the 81st Infantry Regiment. According to U.S. Army official historian John Miller, the total number of men in the attacking force was either 15,400 or 19,000, although Shindo states that only 9,548 were directly committed to the fighting. The Japanese did not have any air support, as it had been diverted to make up for losses on Truk. Similarly, the Imperial Japanese Navy was unable to provide any assistance. The Japanese did, however, hold the high ground overlooking the perimeter around Torokina, giving them the ability to observe the US dispositions.

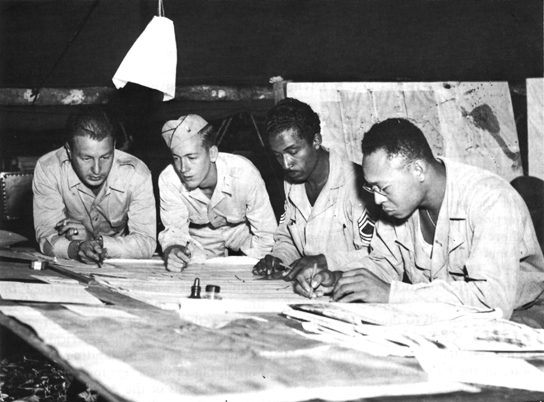
Soldiers from the 24th Infantry Regiment plotting defensive positions in March 1944

The U.S. Army XIV Corps, under the command of Major General Oscar Griswold, had taken over responsibility for the Torokina perimeter from the Marines in mid-December 1943. They greatly outnumbered the Japanese force and enjoyed much stronger artillery support. At the time of the attack, the corps had a total strength of 62,000 men. It comprised two divisions and a large number of support units; both of the divisions were veteran units which had seen combat elsewhere in the Solomon Islands. The Americal Division, under Major General John R. Hodge, held the eastern portion of the perimeter and was made up of the 132nd, 164th and 182nd Infantry Regiments. The remainder of the perimeter was defended by Major General Robert S. Beightler's 37th Infantry Division, whose main elements were the 129th, 145th and 148th Infantry Regiments. Almost all of the infantry regiments on the perimeter had been assigned additional machine guns, and each regiment received a battery of 75 mm pack howitzers on 3 March. The support units available to the corps included the 754th Tank Battalion, 3rd Marine Defense Battalion, 82nd Chemical Battalion (which was equipped with mortars), the 1st Battalion of the 24th Infantry Regiment (an African-American unit which was mainly being used for laboring), the 1st Fiji Battalion and several engineer units. U.S. Army and Navy and Royal New Zealand Air Force (RNZAF) security units were deployed within the perimeter to protect the airfields from attack.

XIV Corps did not have its own corps artillery, but Brigadier General Leo Kreber, the 37th Division's senior artillery officer, was appointed to command all of the artillery units within the perimeter, including the eight battalions which formed part of the infantry divisions. Six of these units were equipped with 105 mm (4.1 in) howitzers and the other two operated short-ranged 155 mm (6.1 in) howitzers. A provisional corps artillery unit was also formed which comprised two batteries of long-ranged 155 mm "Long Tom" guns from the 3rd Defense Battalion and eight batteries of 90 mm (3.5 in) anti-aircraft guns from the 251st Anti-aircraft Artillery Regiment and the marine defense battalion. In February the 2nd Battalion, 54th Coast Artillery Regiment, arrived to augment the XIV Corps' artillery. This became the first African American unit to see combat in the South Pacific.

The American troops were supported by air and naval units. The U.S. Navy force assigned to the island comprised the six destroyers of Destroyer Squadron 22, a squadron of PT boats, a small number of Landing Craft Infantry fitted as gunboats and several armed landing craft. Most of the air units on Bougainville were drawn from the 1st Marine Air Wing, which had 64 SBD Dauntless dive bombers and 32 TBF Avenger torpedo bombers available for ground support tasks. Two RNZAF fighter squadrons were also stationed at Bougainville.

=== Opposing plans ===
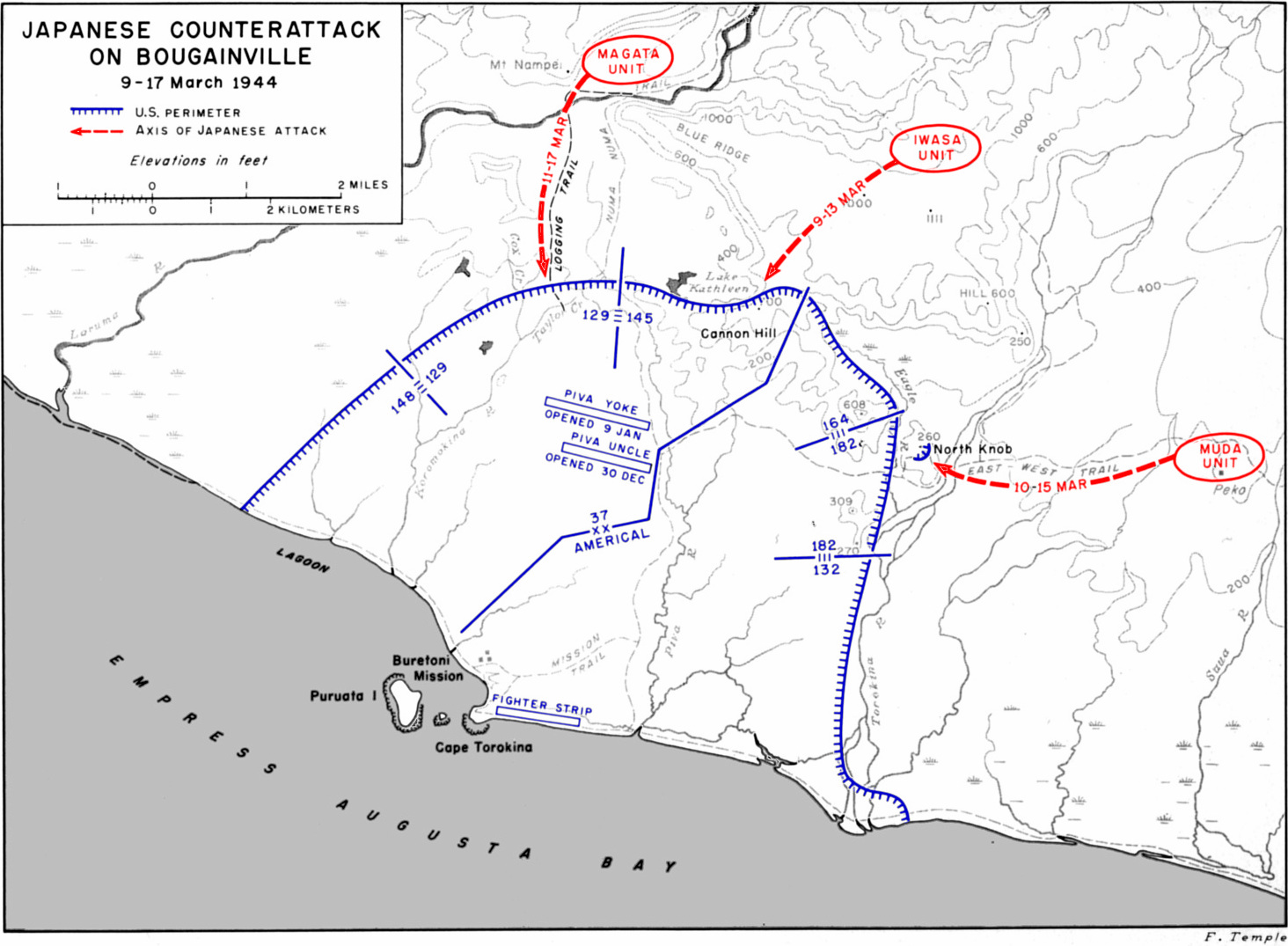
The Japanese counterattack on Bougainville between 9 and 17 March 1944. The U.S. perimeter is marked in blue and Japanese troop movements are shown in red.

The Japanese offensive plans specified that the three units would make a series of coordinated but separate attacks on the American perimeter. These involved capturing strategically significant hills within the perimeter and then assaulting the airfields. The Iwasa Unit would begin the offensive by advancing southwest and capturing Hill 700, at the middle of the U.S. perimeter line, on 8 March. It would then rest for two days before advancing against the Piva airfields. The Muda Unit was to launch its attack on the east side of the perimeter 10 March by advancing west and capturing Hills 260 and 309. On 12 March it and a battalion from the Iwasa Unit would capture Hill 608. The attack would then switch to the west, and the Magata Unit would begin its attack on 11 March and move south through low-lying terrain to assault the 129th Infantry Regiment. After defeating this unit, the Magata Unit would join the Iwasa Unit's advance on the airfields. Once these airfields were secured, the three units would advance to Cape Torokina and capture it by 17 March. Because of their inadequate supply of rations, the Japanese needed to achieve a rapid victory.

The American perimeter was strengthened ahead of the attack. The size of the perimeter had been expanded slightly since late 1943 and was 23,000 yd (21,000 m) long. The defensive positions along the front line were further developed, and reserve positions were constructed. An outpost to the east of the perimeter on Hill 260 was held both as an artillery observation post and to prevent the Japanese from using it for the same purpose. The only weaknesses in the American position were that the number of troops and artillery available were smaller than what the U.S. Army would normally use to defend a perimeter of that length, and that the Japanese held hills which overlooked almost all of the perimeter.

== Battle ==
The Japanese attack was focused on three separate areas around the U.S.-held perimeter: Hill 700 in the center, Hill 260 in the east, and around Taylor's and Cox's Creeks in the north. The offensive began with an artillery bombardment on 8 March. At 05:45 Japanese artillery began firing into the beachhead; the Piva airfields were the main targets of this shelling, and three aircraft were destroyed and 19 damaged. The Americans quickly located the Japanese guns, and their artillery began counter-battery fire. U.S. Navy destroyers provided fire support from their anchorage in Empress Augusta Bay, and American aircraft bombed several of the hills outside the perimeter. As a result of the bombardment, all aircraft based at the Piva airfields other than six TBF Avengers were moved to the nearby island of New Georgia.

The next day Japanese artillery targeted the fighter strip at Torokina. Few shells landed on the American front-line positions on either day. All of the U.S. and New Zealand fighter units on Bougainville operated from Torokina throughout the Japanese offensive, though they were sent to nearby islands each evening to ensure that they were not attacked on the ground. Each day, American SBD and TBF aircraft flew more than 100 sorties over Bougainville in direct support of the ground troops, and USMC and RNZAF fighter bombers attacked Japanese supply lines.

=== Hill 700 ===
While the Iwasa Unit arrived at its attack position on 8 March, its assault on the American perimeter was delayed until the next day. Hill 700, in the 37th Division's sector, was held by the 2nd and 3rd Battalions of the U.S. Army's 145th Infantry Regiment. Very steep with a deep saddle between two knolls, Hill 700 proved difficult to both defend and to attack. For several days prior to the attack there had been clashes between U.S. and Japanese patrols in the front of the position, and Japanese patrols had been engaged in wire cutting around the perimeter. Several small skirmishes were fought between these units and elements of the Japanese 23rd Infantry Regiment on 8 March, and the 37th Division's artillery bombarded areas from where the Japanese could potentially launch an attack on the 2nd Battalion, 145th Infantry. The 23rd Infantry Regiment belatedly began to attack just after midnight on 9 March amidst heavy rain but failed to penetrate far into the American defenses. After daybreak on 9 March, elements of the 1st and 2nd Battalions of the 145th Infantry Regiment counterattacked the Japanese and regained most of the terrain which had been lost. Two M3 Stuart tanks from the 754th Tank Battalion supported the attack but proved ineffective on the steep terrain. Meanwhile, the Japanese took advantage of the terrain to bring machine gun and mortar fire down on the U.S. supply route dubbed McClelland Road. Two destroyers provided fire support for the U.S. Army forces and fired a total of 400 rounds during the day. As night fell, forward movement largely ceased. Both sides maintained a defensive posture throughout the night, exchanging small arms and indirect fire.

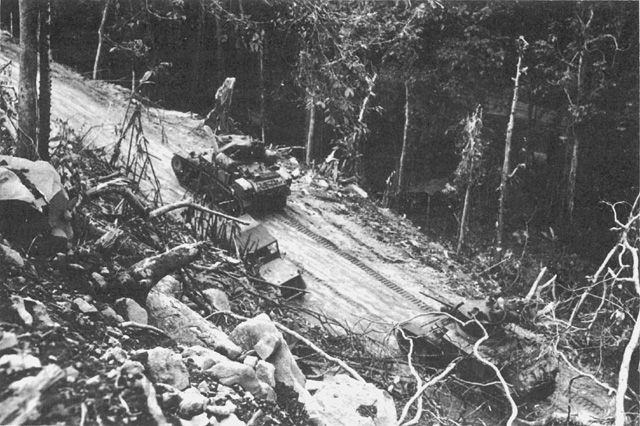
Light tanks from the 754th Tank Battalion around Hill 700, 9 March 1944

The Iwasa Unit attacked again at 06:45 on 10 March but did not make any progress. Its attack was repelled by heavy indirect fire as well as small arms fire. U.S. forces then prepared a counterattack and were reorganized to do so throughout the afternoon. Meanwhile, airstrikes were carried out on Japanese positions by 36 aircraft. At 17:00 parts of the 1st and 2nd Battalions of the 145th Regiment launched a well-coordinated attack and managed to recapture more of the area lost on 9 March. The remaining men of the Iwasa Unit conducted an offensive against Hill 700 on the night of 10/11 March but only managed to capture a single bunker. Further Japanese attacks on the morning of 11 March were unsuccessful.

Beightler, the commander of the 37th Division, was frustrated by the 145th Infantry's failure to reestablish its original perimeter and reinforced the regiment on 11 March with the 2nd Battalion, 148th Infantry Regiment. During that day the commander of the 145th Infantry, Colonel Cecil Whitcomb, was also relieved of command after Beightler learned that he was suffering from extreme combat fatigue. Following an artillery bombardment, elements of the 2nd Battalion, 148th Infantry Regiment, attacked Japanese positions during the afternoon and captured some ground. This battalion made further progress against Japanese-held bunkers the next day and recaptured the original perimeter lines. The Iwasa Unit began to withdraw on 13 March. The Japanese had suffered heavy losses during the fighting around Hill 700, and the Americans counted 309 bodies near the area recaptured on 11 and 12 March; two prisoners were also taken. The 37th Division's fatalities amounted to 5 officers and 73 enlisted men.

=== Hill 260 ===
Hill 260 was located in the Americal Division's sector, about 800 yd (730 m) outside the main perimeter line, on the southern approaches to the Torokina perimeter. An hourglass-shaped feature consisting of two rounded hills to the north and south—dubbed "North Knob" and "South Knob"—the position was essentially a saddle, albeit one separated by a very narrow handle. The U.S. forces had established an outpost on the feature which was occupied by a reinforced platoon from G Company, 2nd Battalion, 182nd Regiment, and a party of artillery observers; the total strength of this isolated force on 10 March was about 80 men. An observation platform had been erected 150 ft (46 m) up a tree (called "OP tree"), and the heavily forested hill was protected by a network of bunkers which had been constructed out of sandbags and logs. During the night of 9/10 March small parties from the Muda Unit, having assembled at Peko before moving along the East–West Trail, infiltrated the 800 yd (730 m) gap between Hill 260 and the main American perimeter, and the main body of the Japanese force moved into its jumping off position east of the hill. During the night, American artillery also bombarded the approaches to the southern end of the hill.

Japanese forces began their attack on Hill 260 shortly after 06:00 on 10 March, with the intention of using it to launch follow-up attacks on Hills 309 and 608 inside the U.S. perimeter. The initial assault was made by all or part of the 3rd Battalion, 13th Infantry Regiment, and captured the area around the OP tree. Upon being informed of the attack, Griswold ordered that Hill 260 be held at all costs; up to this time the Americal Division's headquarters had not planned to retain the position. E and F Companies of the 2nd Battalion, 182nd Infantry Regiment, were subsequently dispatched to the hill. Most of F Company reinforced the survivors of G Company on Hill 260, and E Company and a platoon from F Company counterattacked to retake the lost ground. The American infantrymen regained some ground, but suffered heavy casualties from Japanese fire and exhaustion before the attack was broken off in the evening of 10 March. The Japanese attacked E Company early in the morning of 11 March, but were beaten back. G Company (less its platoon in defensive positions) attempted to relieve E Company later that day, but also came under attack. B Company, 182nd Infantry Regiment, was moved forward to assist the other two companies in breaking contact with the Japanese forces and retiring to the main perimeter on Hill 260's North Knob, which was achieved during the morning.

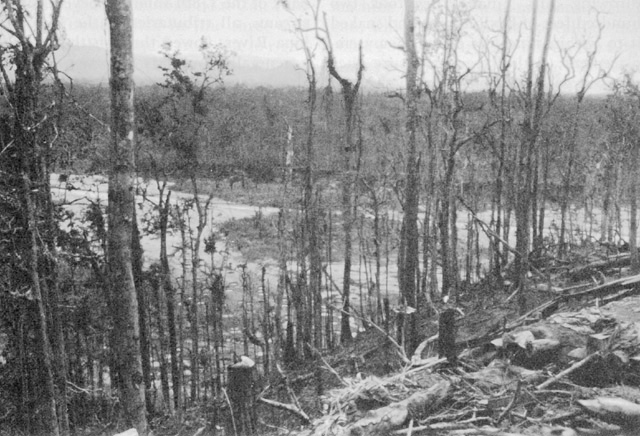
The scene on the North Knob (Hill 260) following the battle

The assistant U.S. divisional commander, Brigadier General William A. McCulloch, arrived in the afternoon to direct the battle on Hill 260. Flamethrower teams from the 132nd Infantry Regiment also arrived. In the afternoon, American forces attempted to regain the South Knob. While this effort was initially successful and led to the extraction of several American soldiers who had been isolated on the position, by late afternoon the U.S. units had been forced to withdraw to the North Knob. The fighting on Hill 260 died down in the evening of 11 March, as neither the Japanese nor U.S. forces attempted any offensive action. Muda took the opportunity to concentrate his forces to fully occupy the South Knob, and several bunkers were established overnight.

Japanese indirect fire opened the fighting early on 12 March, falling across the Americal Division's front. U.S. artillery and mortars fired back, targeting the Muda Unit on the South Knob. Such was the proximity of their position to the U.S. defenders on the North Knob that the Americans there were forced to take cover from their own artillery. With supplies on the North Knob running low, efforts were made by U.S. troops to bring ammunition, food and water forward; this required soldiers to carry heavy loads forward under fire. The carrying parties were supported by covering fire from protection parties. By midday, a sufficient quantity of supplies had been brought forward for the Americans to launch an attack. This involved A Company, 1st Battalion, 182nd Infantry Regiment, providing supporting fire from the North Knob while B Company carried out a flanking move to attack the South Knob from the west with flamethrowers and indirect fire support. After initial gains, this attack was held up. In an effort to hold the ground that had been gained, A Company, 1st Battalion, 132nd Infantry Regiment, was dispatched to reinforce B Company, but it too came under heavy fire and was held up. As a result, B Company had to be withdrawn to the North Knob for the night. As local U.S. commanders calculated the cost of continuing to hold Hill 260, the Americal Division sought permission to withdraw. This was refused by XIV Corps headquarters.

The U.S. forces made further attempts to secure Hill 260 on 13 March, but several attacks were defeated after the American troops crested the South Knob. As casualties mounted, McCulloch resolved to abandon the direct approach, instead deciding that he would seek to wear down the defenders on the South Knob after patrols discovered that the Japanese had no reserves left to reinforce the position. From this it was assessed that their effort in the sector had been spent, and regardless of whether they managed to hold the South Knob, they would be unable to exploit the position further. This assessment was correct, as the Japanese had begun transferring troops from this sector to reinforce the Magata Unit around the northern perimeter. It was hoped that these transfers would concentrate enough force to achieve a break-in. Consequently, only a small Japanese force remained on the South Knob. Over the following days, this force was subjected to heavy bombardment and flame attacks, which lasted until the Japanese withdrew from the position on 27 March. Casualties in the Hill 260 sector amounted to 98 U.S. servicemen killed, 24 missing, and 581 wounded. A total of 560 Japanese dead were found on top of the South Knob when the U.S. forces reoccupied it on 28 March.

=== Taylor's and Cox's Creeks ===
The Magata Unit approached Cape Torokina from the north by moving along the Logging Trail which had been built by U.S. engineers and entered the northwestern sector of the perimeter near Taylor's Creek. Between 11 and 17 March troops from the Magata Unit attacked the positions occupied by the U.S. 129th Infantry Regiment in the vicinity of Cox's and Taylor's Creeks west of the Numa Numa Trail in the 37th Division's sector. Following the commencement of the Japanese counterattack in the central and southern sectors on 8/9 March, the northern perimeter came under bombardment from Japanese indirect fire. Initially there were several small scale actions but no major engagements. On 11 March, the main elements of the Magata Unit concentrated around their assembly area on Mount Nampei in preparation for an assault. As they began advancing southwest, the U.S. outposts were withdrawn and heavy barrages of fire were laid down in front of the American positions. By early evening the two forces were engaged in a heavy exchange of fire along the Logging Trail, which lasted until darkness had fallen. Throughout the night, small parties of Japanese troops attempted to infiltrate the American positions, cutting the wire in several places and successfully capturing several bunkers around the junction of Taylor's Creek and the Logging Trail, as well as several more further to the east.

Throughout the following day, the U.S. forces attempted to retake the lost positions to restore the integrity of their line. Fighting raged into the early afternoon, by which time the Americans had recaptured several bunkers. In the evening, the Americans used indirect fire and searchlights to harass the Japanese. Their attack recommenced just before dawn the next morning and recaptured another bunker. As morning progressed, the U.S. commander requested tank support, and four tanks from the 754th Tank Battalion were dispatched. In the meantime, minor counterattacks regained part of the line; by mid-morning the tanks joined the fighting and several more positions were retaken by the U.S. troops in several attacks before and after noon. Having run out of ammunition and running low on fuel, the first group of tanks was withdrawn and replaced with a fresh platoon with which the attack was resumed in the mid-afternoon. Fighting continued throughout the day until 19:30 when the Japanese retired from the position for the evening, having been forced to give up all of their earlier gains.

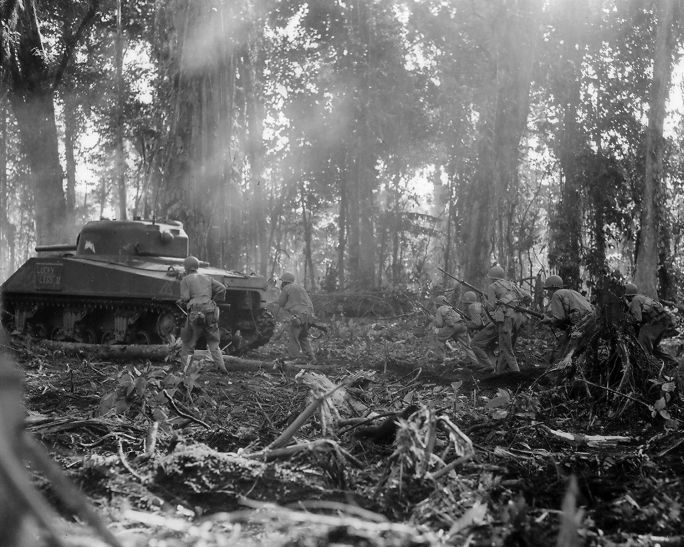
Troops from the 129th Infantry Regiment advance with armoured support, 16 March 1944

Although there were minor exchanges of fire and some patrol activity, there was a lull in the battle on 14 March in the northern sector. The following day, three Japanese infantry battalions fell on the U.S. positions before dawn. They gained some ground around Cox's Creek, but U.S. forces counterattacked with air support, bazookas and flamethrowers, and retook part of the line. A platoon of M4 Sherman tanks arrived during the afternoon. At around 15:00 the tanks attacked the Japanese with supporting artillery fire and regained more of the perimeter. From there, the battle followed a similar pattern, with a lull in the fighting on 16 March, followed by a renewed effort by the Japanese the next day, with several U.S. positions being overrun.

At this point, the Japanese commanders decided to concentrate their efforts in the northern sector along the frontage held by the 129th Infantry Regiment. They began moving the Iwasa and Muda Units to link up with the Magata Unit, in order to launch an all-out assault aimed at reaching the airfields. This movement was not completed until 23 March, by which time the Japanese had concentrated around 4,850 troops. Fighting was limited to patrol actions in the intervening period during which time the defending U.S. troops worked to improve the perimeter defenses. A general attack began after sundown that day with shelling and skirmishes prior to a series of assaults through the low ground.

This proved the final element of the Japanese counterattack. Forewarned by captured plans, the U.S. troops had been expecting the attack. A heavy American artillery barrage fell on the main Japanese assault forces as they formed up, which disrupted their advance by inflicting heavy casualties. Nevertheless, the Japanese captured several forward positions. In the daylight on 24 March, U.S. troops launched a strong counterattack, supported by tanks and seven artillery battalions, after large numbers of reserves were poured in to the sector. Casualties amongst the Japanese were heavy. Air attacks fell on the Iwasa Unit's rear area and amidst intense fighting, a battalion of the Japanese 45th Infantry Regiment was completely destroyed, while another from the 53rd almost suffered the same fate. This offensive halted the Japanese for good. Finally, Hyakutake called an end to the operation. As the Japanese began to withdraw, Fijian troops and U.S. soldiers from Griswold's reserve pursued the withdrawing troops on 25 March.

As well as providing fire support for Army units, the U.S. Navy forces at Bougainville sought to prevent other Japanese offensives throughout the battle. Four destroyers bombarded Japanese supply dumps and troop concentrations near the mouth of the Reini River to the east of the perimeter every day between 3 and 16 March. As it was believed that the Japanese would attempt to use barges to land a force inside the perimeter, the destroyers and PT boats stationed at Bougainville patrolled along the coast of Empress Augusta Bay each night. U.S. Navy Seabees also manned several of the defensive positions which had been established along beaches within the perimeter.

== Aftermath ==
The counterattack drew to a close on 27 March, as Hyakutake gave the order for his forces to cease the attack and withdraw. As they began to move, elements of the Japanese 6th Cavalry Regiment (Note: The 6th Cavalry Regiment had left behind most of its horses when it deployed to the South Pacific, and was formally converted to a dismounted unit as part of Army-wide reforms to divisional cavalry regiments in August 1943. Its soldiers fought as riflemen.) and the 2nd Battalion, 4th South Seas Garrison Unit, acted as a screening force to cover their movement. The next day Hill 260 was retaken by American troops. Meanwhile, the Japanese withdrew, largely in an orderly fashion, to the positions they had occupied prior to the battle. In the following weeks, the U.S. forces expanded their perimeter and harassed the Japanese. This operation sought to occupy key terrain and establish outposts and blocking positions along potential Japanese avenues of advance. It involved the African American troops of the 24th Infantry Regiment and 93rd Infantry Division who were committed to battle to gain combat experience.

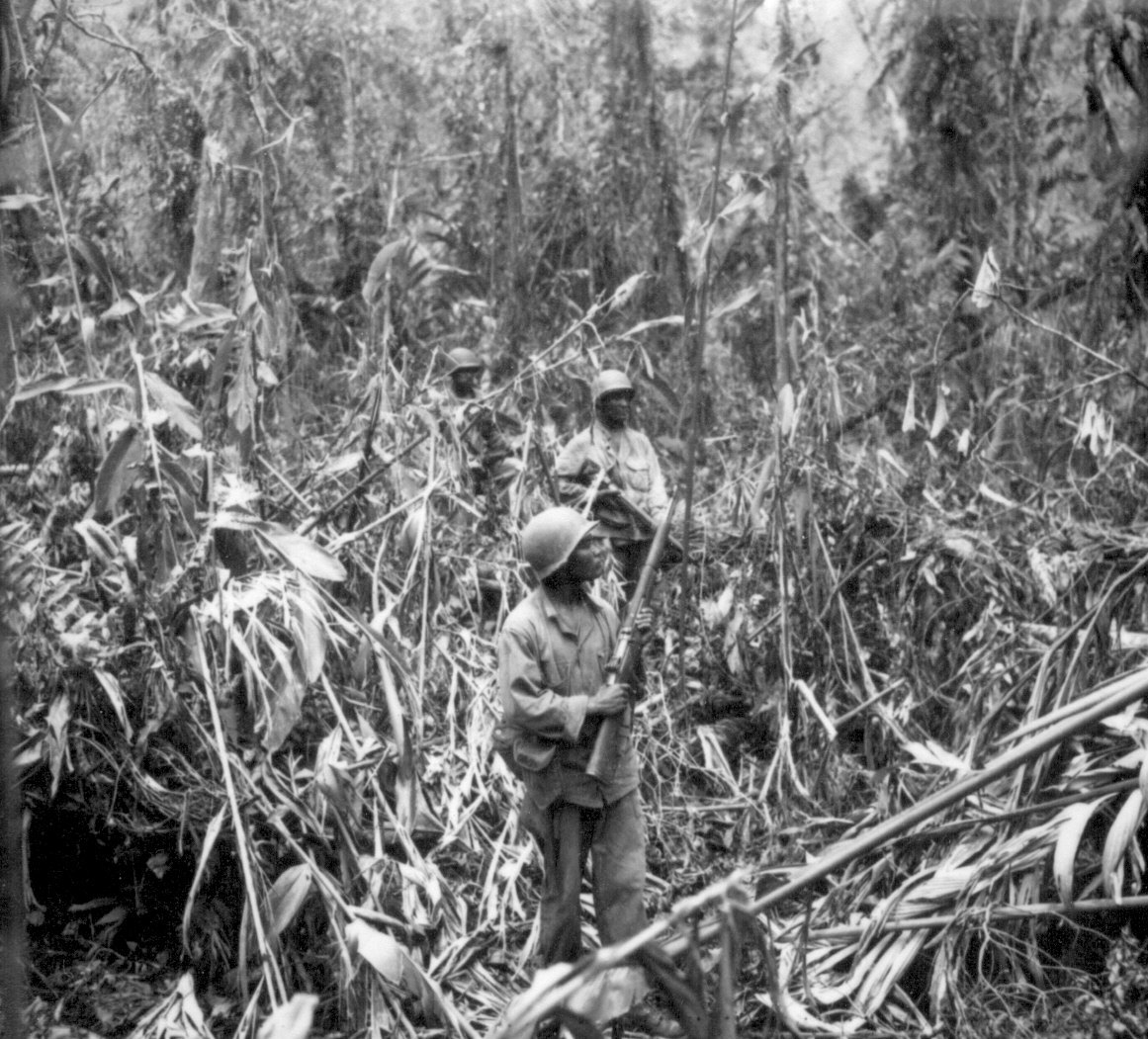
U.S. Army soldiers from the 93rd Infantry Division patrol the Numa Numa Trail, May 1944

Figures for Japanese casualties during the attack differ. The U.S. Army's official history, which was published in 1959, puts Japanese losses at "over 5,000 men killed, more than 3,000 wounded". In contrast, Australian historian Karl James wrote in 2012 that "the Japanese estimated that they lost 3,500 men killed and another 5,500 wounded" and noted that many of the wounded subsequently died from starvation or disease. Shindo stated in 2016 that of those directly involved in the battle 2,700 were killed; however, he provides total figures of 5,400 dead and 7,100 wounded, which include units other than the 6th Division involved in fighting around the same time. Shindo's figures of 12,500 killed or wounded over this period are also supported by Kengoro Tanaka. Several units were disbanded because of these losses, and morale among the surviving Japanese personnel on Bougainville slumped.

Allied losses were much lighter. The U.S. Army official history states that XIV Corps suffered 263 fatalities. A monograph prepared by the Office of the U.S. Army's Surgeon General in 1962 puts the total Allied casualties on Bougainville between 15 February and 21 April 1944 as 2,335. These included 395 deaths and 1,940 men wounded.

== Assessments ==
In summing up the counterattack, U.S. Army official historian John Miller argues that the Japanese offensive failed because of poor planning and intelligence. The Japanese commanders underestimated the strength of the U.S. defenders, who greatly outnumbered them and had far superior artillery support. Even if XIV Corps had been as weak as the Japanese believed, the force committed to the attack did not include enough troops or artillery to penetrate the well-prepared defenses. Miller argues further that the attack might have achieved a degree of success, at least in terms of inflicting heavy casualties on the U.S. forces, had Hyakutake concentrated his forces prior to the attack, rather than building them up over the course of the fighting. This would have potentially produced a break in the U.S. line, which the Japanese might have been able to exploit to penetrate into the rear areas and cause considerable destruction before the U.S. forces regrouped. This did not happen, and the veteran U.S. troops held their positions. Miller opines that had the offensive been successful, it would have had a serious effect on the campaign in the Solomons, resulting in a large drain on Allied resources, but would most likely not have altered the wider course of the war.

Samuel Eliot Morison, the official historian of the U.S. Navy in World War II, reaches similar conclusions. He judges that while a successful attack on the airfields would have "cut the most important link in the Allied armed chain around Rabaul", the Japanese offensive failed because of the strength of the Allied defenses and the determined resistance put up by the garrison. In his analysis Morison also highlights the advantages the Allies gained from having air and naval superiority at Bougainville. Regardless of the reasons the counterattack failed, Shindo contends that the Japanese commanders never believed they would be successful in recapturing Bougainville. This is supported by Tanaka who wrote that Imamura's decision to attack had been based upon a desire to make "some contribution to general military situation", and to attack while they still could, rather than an assessment that they could force the Allies to withdraw from Bougainville.

After the defeat of the counterattack and the brief U.S. pursuit that followed in April, the focus of Japanese operations on Bougainville turned largely to subsistence. The incidence of illness began to rise as a result of the severance of the supply line from Rabaul. In contrast, the Allied base at Torokina grew considerably, eventually stretching 6 mi (9.7 km) along the coast, and 5 mi (8.0 km) inland. Well-stocked with supplies, equipment and amenities, including medical and recreation facilities, it became a symbol of Allied power and wealth that was used to impress the local Bougainvilleans. The U.S. forces on the island assumed a largely defensive posture following the defeat of the Japanese attack, with the perimeter around Torokina being further fortified. Apart from limited patrolling, the Americans did not pursue an offensive campaign throughout 1944, preferring to contain the Japanese rather than attempting to destroy them. This situation began to change in late 1944, when the Australian II Corps, under the command of Lieutenant General Stanley Savige, started to relieve the U.S. forces, who were transferred to the Philippines. After taking over the U.S. base around Torokina, the Australians subsequently began a three-pronged offensive to secure the island, with heavy fighting taking place from December 1944 until close to the end of the war. Major actions were fought around Slater's Knoll, Tsimba Ridge, Porton Plantation, and Ratsua, and along the Hongorai River.
