= Battle of Hellzapoppin Ridge and Hill 600A =

1943 battle

- Part of the Bougainville Campaign of the Pacific Theater (World War II)
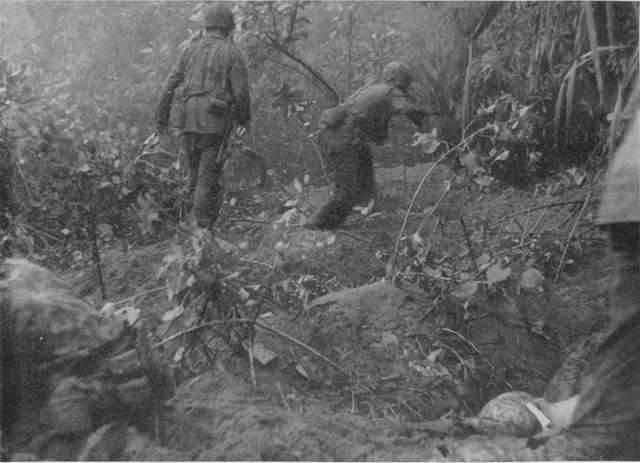
- US Marines clear a Japanese position on Hill 600A
Date	12–24 December 1943
Location	Bougainville in the South Pacific
Result	Allied victory

Belligerents
United States	(Empire of Japan) Japan

Commanders and leaders
(United States) Allen H. Turnage (United States) Evans O. Ames	(Empire of Japan) Harukichi Hyakutake (Empire of Japan) Masatane Kanda

Units involved
21st Marine Regiment	23rd Infantry Regiment

Strength
Unknown	235 (initially)

Casualties and losses
17 killed, 32 wounded	~ 51 killed

The Battle of Hellzapoppin Ridge and Hill 600A consisted of a series of engagements fought in mid-December 1943 on Bougainville between forces of the United States Marine Corps and the Imperial Japanese Army. Although minor in terms of casualties and in comparison to other battles in the Bougainville campaign, the battle was the last significant action undertaken by the 3rd Marine Division on the island before they were replaced by United States Army soldiers from XIV Corps. It resulted in the capture of the two positions by the Marines with the support of artillery and aircraft, and the withdrawal of the Japanese forces as the American perimeter, which had been established around Torokina in November, was expanded towards the Torokina River.

== Background ==
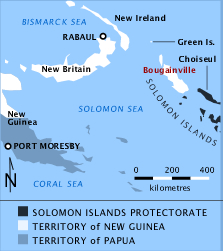
Bougainville and surrounds

In early November 1943, the 3rd Marine Division, under Major General Allen H. Turnage, landed at Cape Torokina near Empress Augusta Bay on the western coast of Bougainville. The landing took place as part of Allied efforts to advance towards the main Japanese base around Rabaul, the isolation and reduction of which was a key objective of Operation Cartwheel. Opposing the US troops at Cape Torokina were troops of Lieutenant General Harukichi Hyakutake's 17th Army, part of General Hitoshi Imamura's 8th Area Army, based at Rabaul. The bulk of the infantry forces were drawn from the 6th Division, under Lieutenant General Masatane Kanda.

Following the landing, a series of battles were fought around the beachhead, which was slowly expanded by the Marines out to about 8–10 kilometers (5.0–6.2 mi) by the end of the month. Throughout November, the Japanese had begun moving artillery pieces into position around the perimeter and began shelling the beachhead from several hills to the east of the Numa–Numa and East–West Trails, along the Torokina River. Following the fighting around Piva Forks in late November, plans were drawn up by US commanders to advance towards the Torokina River where a series of high features offered significant defensive advantages that could be exploited in the event of a Japanese counterattack, which US intelligence expected. The general outline of the US plan was to establish a defensive line parallel to the Torokina, along a ridge line that extended to the west from a position in the north known as Hill 1000 to Hill 600A in the south.

On 5 December the US advance began, and several minor clashes between patrol-sized elements took place. Two days later, Marines from the 3rd Parachute Battalion met resistance along a spur to the west of Eagle Creek, at a position north of the junction of the East–West Trail near Hill 1000, which later became known to US troops as "Hellzapoppin Ridge" (from the musical) because of its difficult terrain, part of a feature the Japanese dubbed "Picha Mountain". Documents captured by the advancing Marines indicated that a reinforced company of 235 men from the Japanese 23rd Infantry Regiment was holding the position. The hill threatened the flank of the 3rd Parachute Battalion's position, and as a result the Marine commander was forced to readjust his dispositions to place the spur to his front. After consolidating their position and sending out patrols, minor skirmishes took place before the Paramarines launched a company-level attack on the morning of 9 December. Although they managed to break-in to the Japanese position, the Marines were forced back by determined Japanese resistance, having sustained heavy casualties. A flanking maneuver also failed to dislodge the defenders. Late in the day, a company from the 1st Battalion, 21st Marines was sent up to reinforce the Paramarines, and the following day the rest of the 21st Marine Regiment, under the command of Colonel Evans O. Ames, arrived to take over responsibility for capturing the spur line around Hill 1000.

== Battle ==
=== Hellzapoppin Ridge ===
About 300 yards (270 m) long and consisting of sheer sides that rose to a sharp crest no more than 40 yards (37 m) wide, the spur was heavily vegetated and provided many advantages to defending force. Offering good concealment, this made accurate target identification difficult and reduced the effectiveness of the Marines' air support as well as the indirect fires offered by their artillery and naval gunfire support. The Japanese defenders were well dug-in on the position, occupying the reverse slope and having established a series of mutually-supporting positions that were protected with overhead cover and were supported by snipers who were tied-in to the tree tops. Conversely, despite having captured a Japanese map which detailed their positions, lack of familiarity with the terrain and the confined nature of the approaches to it adversely affected the tactical thinking of the US company commanders. The Marines were unable to concentrate their forces beyond platoon strength in the thick jungle, which consequently took away the firepower capabilities, which had been one of their main advantages.

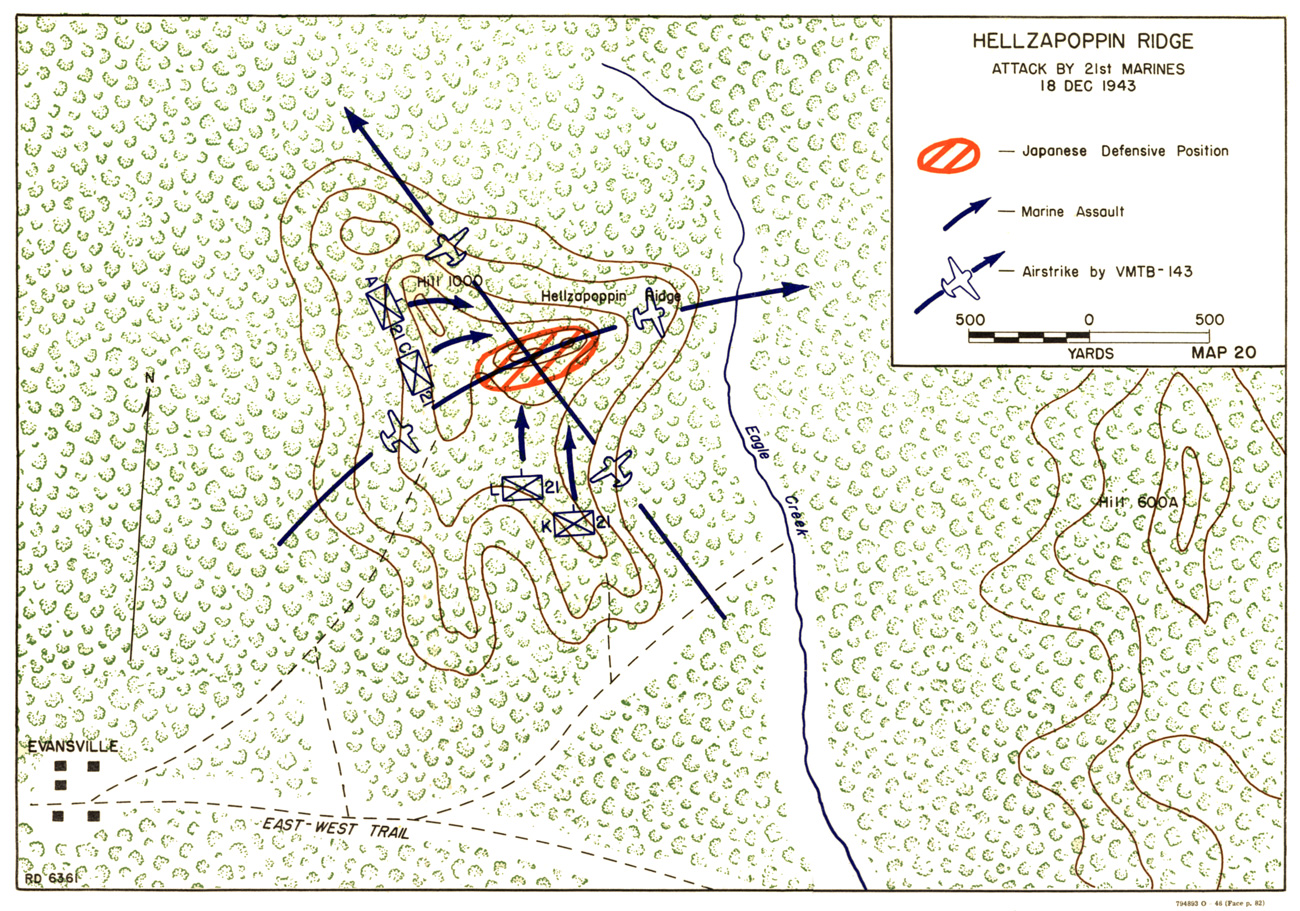
Dispositions of US forces during the final attack on Hellzapoppin Ridge

Commencing on 12 December, a series of assaults were attempted by the 21st Marines, utilizing the "partial envelopment" tactic. The well-sited Japanese positions, however, turned any attempt to take the position by an indirect approach into a frontal assault. Although the Japanese fields of fire were limited by the narrowness of the position, they were well concealed and as a result, at least initially, the first that the Marines knew of the location of the Japanese positions was when they were engaged by them at close range.

Attempts to reduce the Japanese positions through the use of mortars, artillery and airstrikes were hampered by the dense jungle—the thick vegetation caused tree bursts, while reducing the observation of attacking pilots which resulted in inaccurate strafing and bombing—and as a result it was not until 18 December that a large-scale attack could be launched by the Marines to take the hill. That morning three airstrikes were undertaken, along with an artillery barrage, in preparation for an attack at nightfall.

Prior to the attack, a thorough artillery preparation was followed by a fourth airstrike, which was undertaken by six Grumman TBF Avengers from VMTB-143, that through close coordination by forward observers on the ground, dropped forty-eight 100-pound (45 kg) bombs about 75 yards (69 m) in front of the US positions. The aircraft also conducted strafing runs of the Japanese positions. A two-pronged attack was then put in by the 1st and 3rd Battalions, 21st Marines. Companies A and C from the 1st Battalion attacked the position from the northwest, while Companies L and K from the 3rd Battalion attacked from the south. This proved successful as the defenders had been forced from their dug-outs by the earlier artillery fire and air strikes, making them easier targets for the Marines. The previous strikes had also had the effect of clearing some of the vegetation, which made the going easier for the Marines during the attack.

In capturing Hellzapoppin Ridge, the Marines lost 12 men killed and 23 wounded. Japanese losses were at least 50 killed. The morning after the attack, the 1st Battalion, 21st Marines exploited the position as far east as Eagle Creek—which flowed into the Torokina—where they began work on constructing defensive works to consolidate their position.

=== Hill 600A ===
Following the capture of Hellzapoppin Ridge, the Marines began sending patrols to the east over the Eagle River towards the Torokina. These lasted for three days and penetrated far behind the Japanese lines, but they did not prove fruitful for the Marines, resulting in no contact to offset the hardships faced in coming to grips with the terrain. Japanese activity during this time was limited to artillery barrages that were brought down largely on the US supply dumps that were located to the southwest around Evansville and which, as a consequence, resulted in only a few casualties.

Contact between the two forces was reestablished on 21 December when a Marine patrol was engaged by a force of 14–18 Japanese around Hill 600A. Breaking contact, the patrol returned to US lines where the situation was reported. Subsequently a detachment from the 2nd Battalion, 21st Marines was detailed with returning to the location and putting in an attack that afternoon. The attack went in at 15:45, and for the loss of one man killed and another wounded, they were successful in wresting control of the hill from Japanese, who then retired from the position. As the detachment was too small to hold the position against a Japanese counterattack if one was launched, the Marines returned to their main defensive position before the light failed, and they reported the situation to the 3rd Division command post.

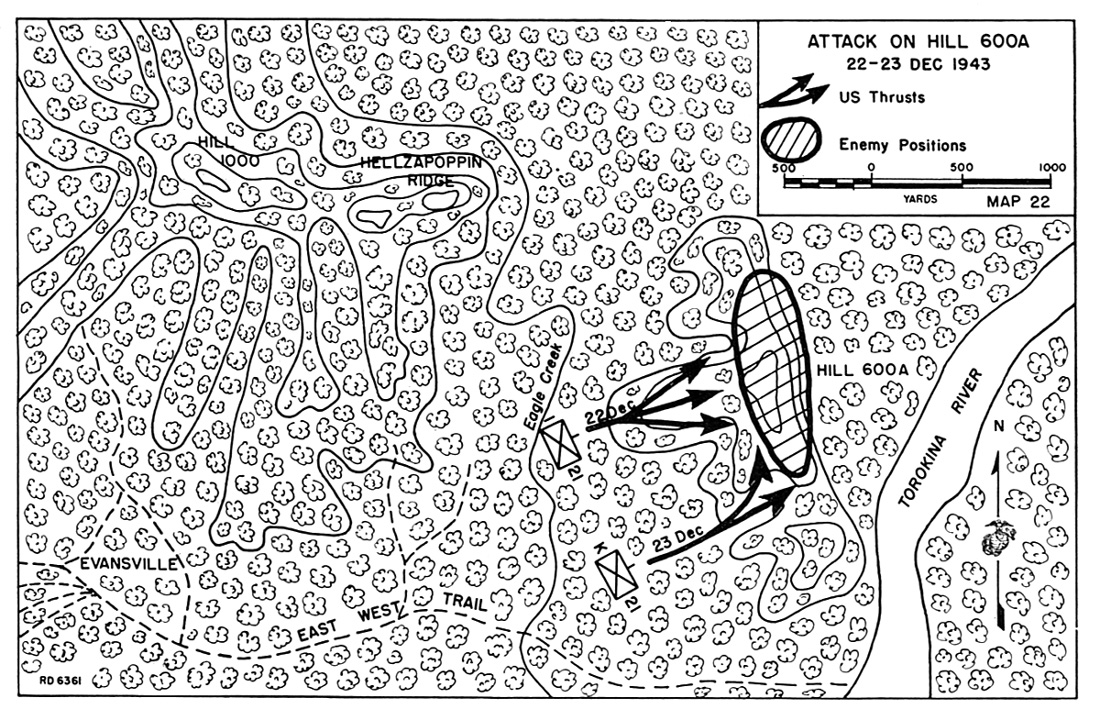
The attack on Hill 600A 22–23 December 1943

Upon receipt of the report, Turnage decided to establish a platoon-sized outpost on the hill, and on 22 December a force from the 3rd Battalion, 21st Marines, which included heavy weapons support and an artillery forward observer, was sent out to occupy it. The Japanese, however, had returned during the night following the battle and had retaken the position and established themselves firmly. Heavy fire prevented the Marines from advancing and forced them to call back to regimental headquarters for reinforcements.

Company I was sent up, and its commander, misreading the situation and thinking that the Japanese held the crest of the ridge rather than the foot of its reverse slope, ordered a three-pronged "double envelopment" maneuver, utilizing two elements of his force to flank while the third attacked frontally. With almost no appreciation of the situation or the terrain, the maneuvering elements turned-in to affect the envelopment too soon and consequently moved into the flanks of the platoon that was in contact, rather than the Japanese emplacements. Consequently, they too began to take heavy fire, and as a result Company I commander gave the order to withdraw so that an artillery strike could be called down on the Japanese. This too proved to be unsuccessful in forcing the Japanese from the hill, and Company I returned to the main defensive position before sunset.

On 23 December Company K renewed the attack with a heavy-weapons platoon attached to provide support by fire. Forming up for an attack further south from where Company I had attacked the day before, one platoon was sent on a reconnaissance along a steep, narrow ridge. Receiving heavy fire, it was forced to fall back and artillery was called in. This had only limited results because of tree bursts; nevertheless, half an hour later, a second platoon was thrown in, and this too was turned back by stiff resistance. Once again indirect fire support was called in, this time lasting only ten minutes but augmented by mortar fires, after which a flanking attack was attempted. This proved unsuccessful, and as night fell Company K withdrew. On the morning of 24 December, however, Marine patrols found that the Japanese had abandoned the position during the night. Four Marines had been killed and eight wounded in taking the position; only one Japanese body was found when the position was searched later.

== Aftermath ==
The capture of Hellzapoppin Ridge allowed US troops to finally neutralize the Japanese artillery firing down on the beachhead around Cape Torokina. The build-up of US forces continued, and by the end of 1943 although there were about 44,000 Americans on the island, a stalemate had developed. While the main Japanese force established itself around Buin in the south of the island with the intention of securing food sources, shortly after the fighting around Hellzapoppin Ridge and Hill 600A the Marines on Bougainville were relieved by soldiers from the US XIV Corps, which—consisting of only two divisions, the 37th and Americal—adopted a mainly defensive posture around Torokina to protect the four airfields that had been constructed there. As a part of this strategy, outposts were established along the main tracks leading to the port, while Fijian troops patrolled the interior of the island.

Between 8 and 25 March 1944 the Japanese commander, Hyakutake, launched an offensive on the American perimeter with 15,000 troops, consisting mainly of the 6th Division and two battalions from the 17th, from Buin and Numa Numa. Suffering considerable casualties—over 5,000 killed compared to American losses of 263—the Japanese withdrew back towards the south. From then until the Australian 3rd Division took over responsibility for the island in November 1944, the Japanese forces—consisting of about 52,000 personnel—sought to avoid contact. American forces, while continuing to maintain a presence through fighting patrols and the establishment of outposts in the north and around Numa Numa, generally pursued a strategy of isolating the Japanese garrison.
