= Battle of Koromokina Lagoon =

1943 WWI I battle on Bougainville Island

- Part of the Bougainville campaign of the Pacific Theater (World War II)
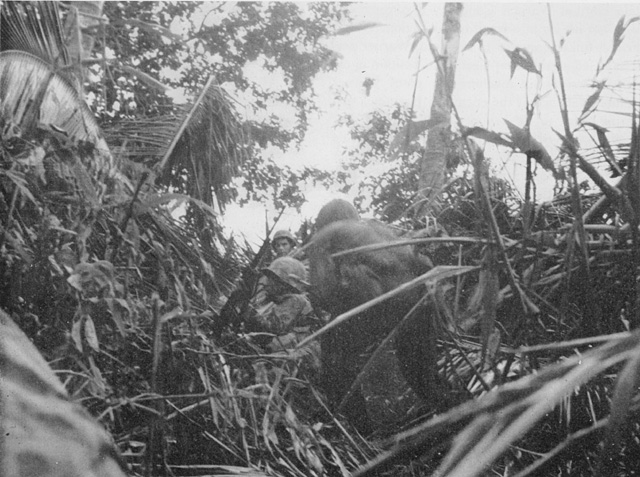
- US Marines battle Japanese infantry on 8 November 1943 on Bougainville during the Battle of the Koromokina Lagoon
| Date | 7–8 November 1943 |
| Location | Bougainville in the South Pacific |
| Result | American victory |

Belligerents
| United States | Japan |

Commanders and leaders
| (United States) Allen H. Turnage (United States) Oscar R. Cauldwell | (Empire of Japan) Hitoshi Imamura (Empire of Japan) Harukichi Hyakutake |

Units involved
| 3rd Marines; 9th Marines; 12th Marines; 3rd Defense Battalion | 53rd Infantry; 54th Infantry |

Strength
| 17,000+ | 850 |

Casualties and losses
| 17 KIA and 30 WIA | 377+ killed |

The Battle of Koromokina Lagoon was fought between the United States Marine Corps and Imperial Japanese Army forces on Bougainville Island. It took place on 7–8 November 1943 during the Bougainville campaign of the Pacific War.

In response to the Allied landings on Bougainville at Cape Torokina, Japanese General Hitoshi Imamura, commander of the 8th Area Army at Rabaul, determined to launch a counterattack. Underestimating the size of the Allied landing forces, the Japanese dispatched a force of 850 soldiers to execute a counter landing to attempt to drive the Allied forces back into the sea. The Japanese soldiers landed from four destroyers near Koromokina Lagoon on the night of 7 November and engaged two battalions of U.S. Marines from the 3rd and 9th Marine Regiments under the command of Major General Allen H. Turnage.

Over the next two days the Japanese attacks were defeated with heavy losses to the attackers. After the battle, Allied forces continued to expand their beachhead on Bougainville with the goal of constructing airfields to attack and neutralize Japanese forces located at Rabaul and nearby areas.

== Background ==
Responding to the Allied landings on Bougainville at Cape Torokina on 1 November 1943, Japanese General Hitoshi Imamura—commander of the 8th Area Army at Rabaul—decided to send a force to counter the Allied landing. Imamura intended to deploy about 3,000 troops from Rabaul; however, US air and naval activity prevented this and limited the Japanese to a smaller force. The Japanese commander on Bougainville, Harukichi Hyakutake, dispatched a large group of reinforcements from the 23rd Infantry Regiment from the main Japanese position around Buin on the southern tip of Bougainville to assault the right flank of the Allied lodgment. Meanwhile, a force of 475 troops was dispatched from Rabaul to the Torokina area to conduct a counter-landing on the left flank in coordination with the assault on the right, while a further 700 were sent to reinforce the Japanese garrison at Buka. These troops were drawn from the Japanese Army's 17th Division and included several companies of the 53rd and 54th Infantry Regiments. With the addition of support and service troops, the Japanese landing force amounted to around 850 troops.

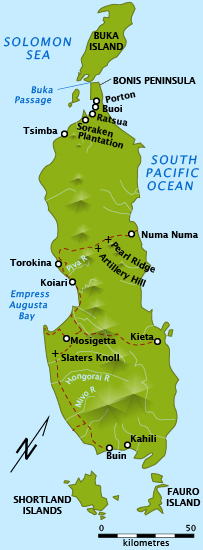
Map showing key locations of the Bougainville campaign

The Japanese estimated US strength in the area to be between 5,000 and 10,000 troops; in reality over 14,000 Marines had been landed around Cape Torokina on the first day. These were followed by another 3,500 on 6 November. These Marines were drawn from Major General Allen H. Turnage's 3rd Marine Division, which had landed as part of Rear Admiral Theodore S. Wilkinson's Third Fleet Amphibious Forces. Following the initial landing operations, Turnage, assisted by Brigadier General Oscar R. Cauldwell, had been in tactical command of the Marines ashore while Lieutenant General Alexander A. Vandegrift returned to Guadalcanal with Wilkinson. As Japanese resistance to the landing petered out, Turnage began reorganizing his forces around the perimeter, establishing patrols and unloading supplies, and commencing important base development work.

The force sailed initially on the night of 1 November; however, the force was sighted by US aircraft, and a large US force subsequently dispatched to respond. This convinced the Japanese that a counterlanding at this time would be difficult with the attempt postponed, and the troops returned to Rabaul. Losses during the naval battle of Empress Augusta Bay further delayed the sailing of the force, and another attempt was cancelled on 5 November after an air raid. The landing force finally departed Rabaul on 6 November aboard four destroyers. They were covered by a force under Rear Admiral Morikazu Osugi. This force included the cruiser Agano, and the destroyers Naganami, Wakatsuki, Shigure, Samidare, Shiratsuyu and Amagiri.

== Battle ==
=== 7 November ===
Shortly after midnight, the transport group entered the objective area, but the first landing attempt was hurriedly abandoned when Allied ships were discovered blocking the way. The destroyers headed north again and back-tracked closer to the shoreline for a second try. A small naval force of eight PT boats had been established by the US Navy around Puruata Island, but none of these boats detected the Japanese force. They unloaded the troops about two miles out from the beaches in Atsinima Bay, with the landing forces going ashore in 21 ramped barges, cutters and motor boats. The landing forces were put ashore near the Laruma River and Koromokina Lagoon, 2 to 3 miles northwest of the Marines perimeter, and were initially unopposed. The landing plans had included a bombardment from the naval force; however, because of an Allied fleet nearby, this was not carried out. After the landing, the Japanese destroyers withdrew.

Defending US troops were initially confused by the landings, believing that the landing craft were American, thereby delaying the US response. Meanwhile, Japanese troops cut off a Marine outpost, which was withdrawn the following day by naval landing craft, and occupied several defensive positions that had been abandoned by the Marines the day before during the reorganization. After a Japanese barge was sighted about 4 mi (3.5 nmi; 6.4 km) northwest of Cape Torokina, a PT boat was assigned to investigate; however, reports from Marines on that flank of the beachhead confirmed the fact that Japanese barges were landing troops at scattered points along the shoreline and that the Marines were engaging them. Artillery fire from the 12th Marine Regiment, coastal defense guns and 90 mm (3.5 in) anti-aircraft batteries of the 3rd Defense Battalion under Lieutenant Colonel Edward H. Forney opened fire on the Japanese barges and landing beaches. The Japanese landings had scattered over a wide area, typical of landings in darkness and rough surf. Unable to reassemble quickly, the Japanese were initially forced to attack in small numbers; the first attack was carried out by less than 100 Japanese soldiers.

The 3rd Battalion, 9th Marine Regiment—under the command of Lieutenant Colonel Walter Asmuth Jr.—was tasked with stopping the Japanese counter thrust. Artillery support fire was called down along front of the perimeter and the beach. At 08:20, Company K, 3rd Battalion—with a platoon from regimental Weapons Company in support—set out, tasked with the Japanese counterattack. About 150 yd (140 m) from the main line of resistance, the advancing Marines hit the front of the enemy force. The Japanese, seeking cover from the artillery fire, had dug-in rapidly and, by taking advantage of abandoned foxholes and emplacements of the departed 1st and 2nd Battalions, 9th Marine Regiment, had established a hasty but effective defensive position.

Heavy fighting broke out with the Japanese firing light machine guns from well-concealed fortifications covered by automatic rifle fire from snipers hidden in trees. Company K's attack stalled and was pinned down; their advance was halted. Japanese resistance increased as reinforcements from the remainder of the counterlanding force began to arrive. At 13:15 the 1st Battalion, 3rd Marines who were in reserve were ordered into the battle, being transferred from the right flank of the US beachhead. Company K provided covering fire while Company B of the 1st Battalion, 3rd Marines moved across the left flank and passed through Company K to take up the fight. Company C of the 1st Battalion, 3rd Marines moved forward on the right flank and Company K withdrew, having lost 5 killed and 13 wounded. Of the 13 wounded, 2 later died.

=== Tank support ===
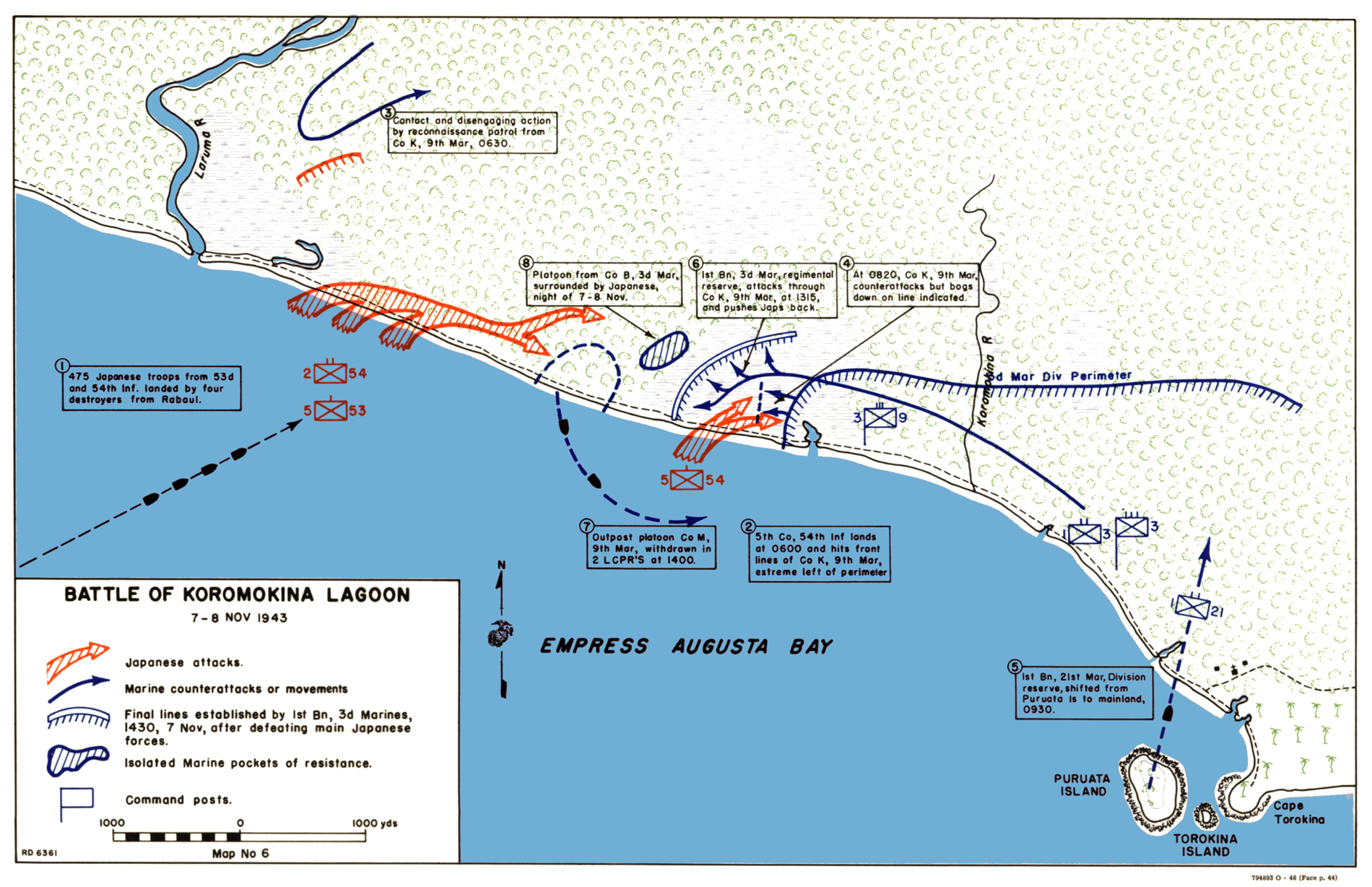
Map depicting the fighting around Koromokina Lagoon, 7/8 November 1943

The two companies of the 1st Battalion, 3rd Marines—under the command of Major John P. Brody—found the going tough as the Japanese positions were well-hidden, and they found themselves under heavy machine gun and automatic weapons fire. Tanks moved up to help with the assault, and the Marines advanced slowly as the tank fire eliminated the enemy emplacements. Late that afternoon, the advance was halted and a heavy artillery concentration, in preparation for a full-scale attack by the 1st Battalion, 21st Marine Regiment against the enemy defenses in front of the Marines. The artillery fire raged through the enemy positions, and Companies B and C placed mortar fire almost on top of their own positions.

Several Marine units had been cut off from the main forces during 7 November. One of these, a platoon from Company K, 3rd Battalion, 9th Marine Regiment had scouted the upper Laruma River region, and ambushed a pursuing Japanese patrol several times before escaping into the interior. The platoon returned to the Marine lines 30 hours later, with one man wounded and one man missing after inflicting a number of casualties on the Japanese landing force. Another patrol from Company M, 3rd Battalion, 9th Marine Regiment was cut off on the beach between two enemy forces and when the radio of the artillery officer with the patrol had failed, he headed back to the main lines directing an artillery barrage that landed on the Japanese position to the left of the patrol from Company M. The patrol then moved toward the Marine lines, only to find the beach blocked by Japanese forces opposing Company K. A message was written in the sand of the beach, which was seen by an air spotter with two tank lighters evacuating the patrol from the beach. Sixty men were evacuated successfully after killing an estimated 35 Japanese. Only two of the Marines had been wounded.

Two other Marine groups became isolated in the fighting along the perimeter. One platoon from the 1st Battalion, 3rd Marine Regiment—scouting the Japanese flank position—slipped through the jungle and passed by the enemy force without being observed. Choosing to head for the beach instead of the interior, the platoon struggled to the coast. There, the patrol cleaned its weapons with gasoline from a wrecked barge, and spent the night in the jungle. The next morning, the attention of an Allied plane was attracted and within an hour the platoon was picked up by a tank lighter and returned to the main lines. The other isolated unit—a patrol from Company B—was cut off from the rest of the battalion during the fighting and spent the night of 7–8 November behind Japanese lines without detection.

=== 8 November ===
The attack by the 1st Battalion, 21st Marine Regiment—under the command of Lieutenant Colonel Ernest W. Fry Jr.—was set for 17:00, but it was postponed until the next morning (8 November). Throughout the night, groups of Japanese troops pushed through US defensive lines, threatening the field hospital that had been established by the 3rd Medical Battalion. A hasty defense was mounted by rear echelon troops, subsequently turned back the assault, protecting the medical staff.

After a 20-minute preparatory barrage by five batteries of artillery together with machine gun, mortar and antitank-gun fire on the morning of 8 November, the 1st Battalion, 21st Marine Regiment passed through the lines of the 1st Battalion, 3rd Marine Regiment companies and began the attack. The infantry were supported by light tanks. Only a few Japanese soldiers fought off the attack with these being killed or captured. More than 250 dead Japanese were found in the area. Moving about 1,500 yd (1,400 m) through the jungle parallel to the shoreline, no further opposition was encountered. That afternoon, a defensive line was established behind a lagoon and extensive patrols were sent out without making contact with the Japanese.

On the morning of 9 November, the area between the Marine positions and the Laruma River was bombed and strafed by American dive bombers from Munda Airfield on New Georgia. Patrols found the bodies of many Japanese who had taken refuge in the Laruma River area. There was no further enemy activity on the left flank of the perimeter, and at noon of that day, control of the sector passed to the US 148th Infantry Regiment of the 37th Division, which had just arrived. The battalion from the 9th Marines moved to the right flank, and the 1st Battalion, 3rd Marine Regiment withdrew to the 3rd Marine Regiment area. The 1st Battalion, 21st Marine Regiment held the left-flank and remained under operational control of the 148th Regiment until other units of the 37th Division arrived.

== Aftermath ==
On 9 November, Major General Roy Geiger assumed command of I Marine Amphibious Corps, replacing Vandegrift. Four days later, he assumed command of all Allied forces on Bougainville and in the immediate vicinity.

The Japanese attempt to destroy the Allied landing force by counter-landing had failed. They underestimated the size of the Allied landing forces, and they were unable to coordinate their actions on both sides of the perimeter. Out of a force of 850 soldiers which were sent, only 475 were landed. At least 377 were killed, the rest withdrew into the jungle. Most of those were killed in the artillery barrages and air strikes between 7 and 9 November. For the Japanese, the landing site was a poor choice: its location was very close to that of the Allied beachhead, which the Japanese believed to be further east around Cape Torokina. In addition, the Japanese had chosen to assault over such a large front that they had been unable to concentrate in sufficient numbers to take advantage of the initial surprise they had achieved. The Marines lost 17 killed and 30 wounded. One Marine, Sergeant Herbert Thomas, received the Medal of Honor posthumously for his actions during the battle, throwing himself on a grenade to protect several other Marines.

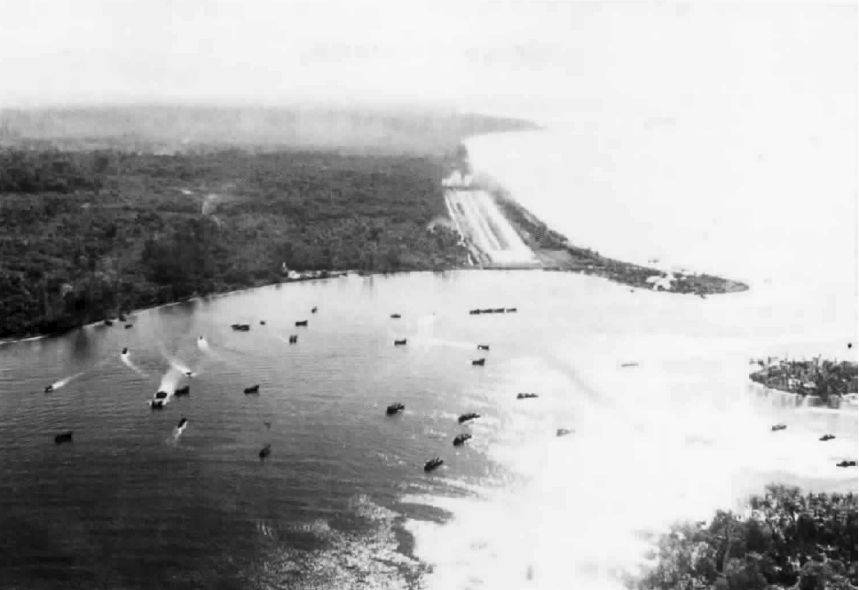
Fighter strip at Torokina, December 1943

The Japanese 23rd Infantry Regiment began arriving from the south and subsequently launched an attack on a US force holding a roadblock around the junction of the Piva and Numa Numa Trails, which were important avenues of approach towards the Allied beachhead. The subsequent Battle for Piva Trail resulted in heavy casualties for the Japanese, with around 550 killed. After this, US Army elements began arriving in force to reinforce the Marines, as further echelons arrived at Cape Torokina, bringing more supplies and expanding the size of US forces on Bougainville further. A further 5,715 troops had landed on 8 November, followed by another 3,599 and 6,678 on 11 and 13 November. With the beachhead secure and command having transitioned ashore, US forces slowly pushed their perimeter forward, systematically advancing to several inland defense lines, resulting in further actions around Coconut Grove, Piva Forks and Hellzapoppin Ridge and Hill 600A.

Initially, Japanese commanders believed that the landing at Cape Torokina was only temporary and would be followed up by another move on Buka. As a result, they held off launching a concerted counterattack even though there were up to 15,000 troops available in southern Bougainville. Meanwhile, the Allies established several airfields inside the Torokina perimeter, which were used to project airpower towards the main Japanese base at Rabaul, while Japanese sea lanes of communication between Rabaul and Bougainville were heavily interdicted. As the conditions necessary for a large-scale counterattack faded, the Japanese 17th Army commander, Hyakutake, was ordered to delay his plans, postponing the assault on Torokina until March 1944.
