= Cocoanut Grove =

Cocoanut Grove (or Coconut Grove) may refer to:

== Places ==
- Coconut Grove, a neighborhood in Miami
  - Coconut Grove (Metrorail station), serving the above location
- Coconut Grove, Northern Territory, Australia, a suburb of Darwin, Northern Territory

=== Nightclubs ===
- Cocoanut Grove (Ambassador Hotel), a nightclub at the Ambassador Hotel in Los Angeles
- Cocoanut Grove (Santa Cruz), a ballroom at the Santa Cruz Beach Boardwalk
- Cocoanut Grove, a nightclub in Boston, Massachusetts, site of the 1942 Cocoanut Grove fire
- Cocoanut Grove, a nightclub on the roof of the Century Theatre (New York City)
- Cocoanut Grove, a nightclub on the roof of the Park Central Hotel in New York City

== Films ==
- Cocoanut Grove (film), a 1938 musical film
- The Coo-Coo Nut Grove, a 1936 animated short

== Music ==
- "Cocoanut Grove", a song by Harry Owens featured in the 1938 film
- "Coconut Grove", a 1966 song by The Lovin' Spoonful from the album Hums of the Lovin' Spoonful, which was covered by David Lee Roth in his album Crazy from the Heat

== Other uses ==
- Battle of the Coconut Grove, a battle between United States Marine Corps and Imperial Japanese Army forces on Bougainville, 13–14 November 1943
- Coconut Grove, a fictional planet in Marvel Comics and the home of Ariel
