= 82nd Chemical Battalion =

US Army Chemical training battalion

The 82nd Chemical Battalion was a United States Army Chemical training battalion for enlisted soldiers entering into the MOS 54B and officers in MOS 74A that was stationed at Fort McClellan, Alabama between 1986 and 1999. At which time, Fort McClellan was closed and the unit transferred to Fort Leonard Wood, Missouri. The battalion was deactivated in September 2007, and the 84th Chemical Battalion took over its duties. The battalion was activated as a Chemical Mortar Battalion at Fort Bliss, Texas, in World War II.

== History ==
Constituted on 12 March 1942

Activated on 25 April 1942 at Fort Bliss, Texas

Reorganized and redesignated on 16 August 1944 as the 82d Chemical Battalion Motorized

Reorganized and redesignated on 16 March 1945 as the 82d Chemical Mortar Battalion

Inactivated on 20 May 1947 in Japan

Redesignated on 1 July 1988 as the 82nd Chemical Battalion and allocated to the Regular Army
