= Laruma River =

Watercourse, Solomon Islands, Oceania

Coordinates: 6°11′54″S 154°58′31″E

Laruma River is a watercourse on Bougainville in the Solomon Islands of the Pacific Ocean. Located on the west coast of the island at the edge of the Keriaka Limestone Plateau, the Laruma drains into the Solomon Sea. The mouth of the river lies north of village of Laruma (population 141 in 1972) and south of Turupei. The Laruma River marks the boundary between Bannoni language-speaking people to the south and Pivu language-speaking people to the north. Circa 2001, the Laruma River valley had a population density of 14 people per km2.
