= Torokina River =

River in Papua New Guinea

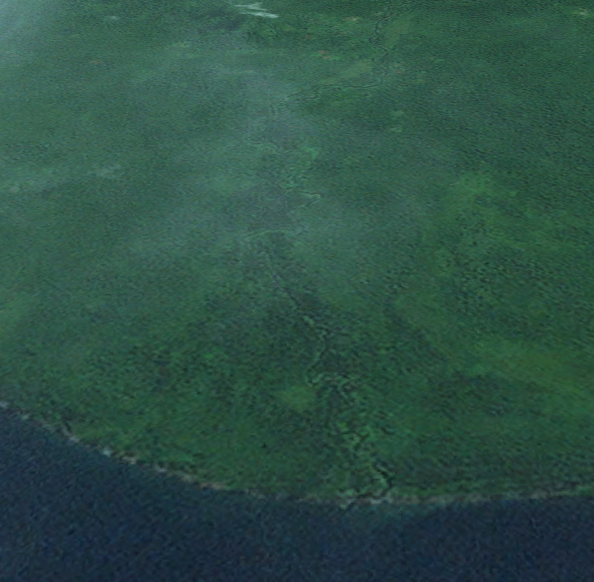
The river mouth of the Torokina on Empress Augusta Bay.

The Torokina River is a river on Bougainville Island, within the Autonomous Region of Bougainville, in northeastern Papua New Guinea.

It empties to Empress Augusta Bay at 6.2666667°S 155.1°E.

== See also ==
- Geography of the Autonomous Region of Bougainville
