= 53rd Infantry Regiment (Imperial Japanese Army) =

- Active: World War II
- Branch: Infantry
- Part of: Eighth Area Army
- Engagements: Second Sino-Japanese War; Bougainville Island

The 53rd Infantry Regiment was an infantry regiment in the Imperial Japanese Army. The regiment was attached to the 17th Infantry Brigade of the 17th Division and participated during the Second Sino-Japanese War as part of the Central China Expeditionary Army, before being assigned to the Thirteenth Army. The regiment fought in the later stages of World War II, assigned to the Japanese Eighth Area Army at Bougainville Island in the Solomon Islands.

== Organization ==
- 1st Battalion
- 2nd Battalion
- 3rd Battalion
