= Numa Numa Trail =

Trail on Bougainville, Papua New Guinea

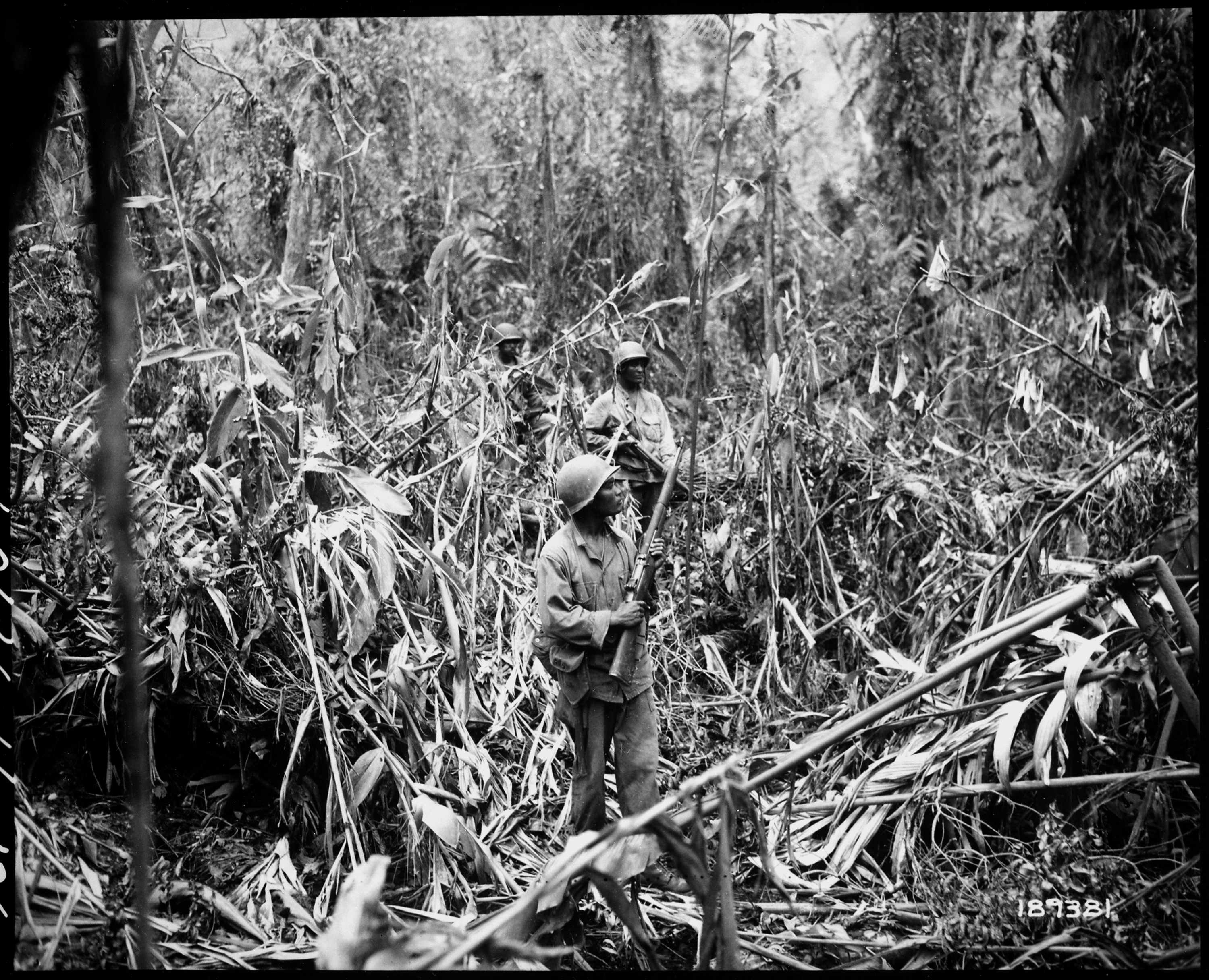
American soldiers advancing through the jungle, while on patrol in Japanese territory off the Numa-Numa Trail, 1 May 1944

The Numa Numa Trail is a trail on Bougainville in Papua New Guinea that runs from Numa Numa near Wakunai, Teperoi and Casuarina Island, a large coconut plantation on the east coast, where it also gave its name to Numa Numa Harbour, over the central mountains of Bougainville to Torokina on the western coast.

The trail was central to the Torokina perimeter defence during the initial phases of the Bougainville campaign during World War II with a number of battles fought along the trail.
