= Empress Augusta Bay =

Bay on Bougainville Island, Papua New Guinea

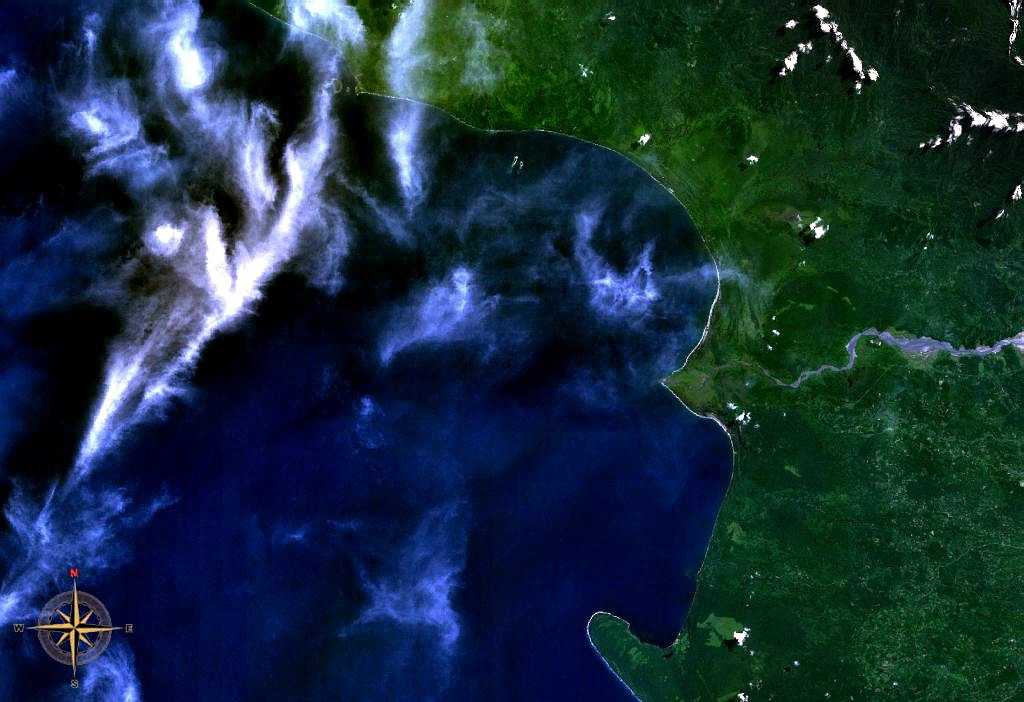
Empress Augusta Bay seen from space

Empress Augusta Bay is a bay on the western side of the island of Bougainville Island, within the Autonomous Region of Bougainville in northeastern Papua New Guinea.

It is a subsistence fishing area for the people of Bougainville.

== History ==
Empress Augusta Bay is named after Augusta of Saxe-Weimar-Eisenach, wife of German Emperor William I; the bay was first surveyed by the German steam frigate SMS Gazelle during a major scientific expedition in August 1875. Later, in the 1880s, Bougainville became part of the German colonial empire, at first within the German protectorate over the South Sea Islands and later administered by German New Guinea.

After Germany's defeat in World War I, the colony passed to Australian control as the Territory of New Guinea.

In November 1943 the bay was the site of the Battle of Empress Augusta Bay, between Allied and Japanese forces.

During the 1970s and 1980s the bay was seriously polluted by copper tailings from the world's largest copper mine, Panguna, operated by Rio Tinto Group. This issue contributed to the formation of the secessionist Bougainville Revolutionary Army and a civil war on the island between 1989 and 1997.

== See also ==
- Geography of the Autonomous Region of Bougainville
- Location coordinates — 6°25′S 155°5′E
