= East West Trail =

Trail in Papua New Guinea

For the East West Trail in Clearwater, Florida see Ream Wilson Clearwater Trail

The East West Trail is a trail on Bougainville that runs from Mawareka and Mosigetta, to Buin in the south. It was wide and traveled around the coastal swamps.

The trail was a major tactical thoroughfare during the Bougainville campaign of World War II, with a number of battles fought along it.
