= 23rd Infantry Regiment (Imperial Japanese Army) =

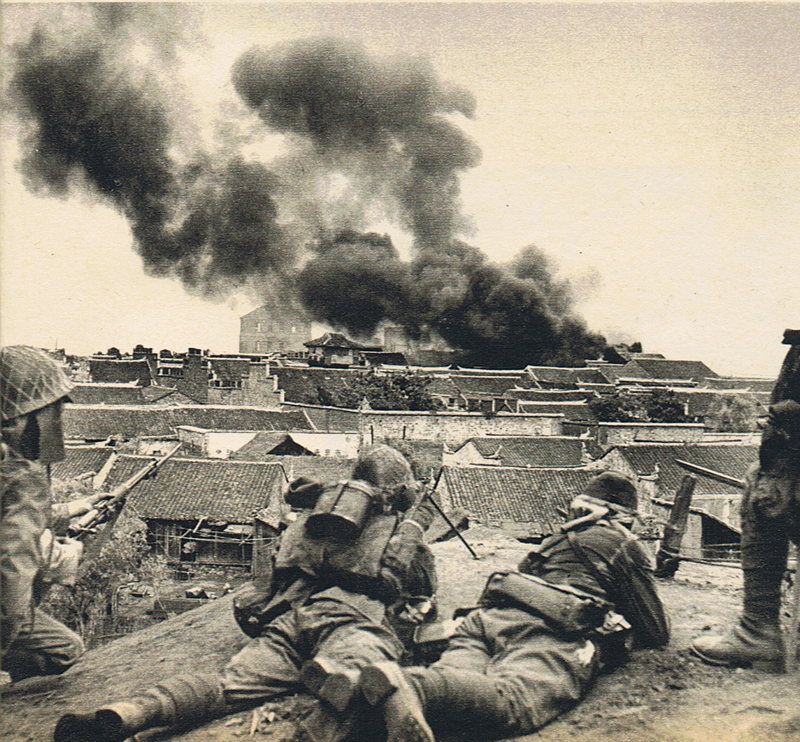
- Battle of Zaoyang-Yichang: Soldiers of the 2nd Battalion, 23rd Infantry Regiment, seizing the Shāshì city, 8 June 1940. The battalion was a part of the "Ikeda Detachment", which went westward along with the IJA 13th Division.
- Country: Japanese Empire
- Branch: Army
- Type: Regiment
- Role: Infantry
- Engagements: Second Sino-Japanese War

The 23rd Infantry Regiment was an infantry regiment in the Imperial Japanese Army. The regiment was attached to the 6th Infantry Brigade of the 6th Division and participated during the Second Sino-Japanese War. The regiment fought in the later stages of World War II, assigned to the Japanese Seventeenth Army at Bougainville Island in the Solomon Islands.

== Organization ==
- 1st Battalion
- 2nd Battalion
- 3rd Battalion
