= December 1943 =

Month of 1943

<<	December 1943					>>
Su	Mo	Tu	We	Th	Fr	Sa
			1	2	3	4
5	6	7	8	9	10	11
12	13	14	15	16	17	18
19	20	21	22	23	24	25
26	27	28	29	30	31

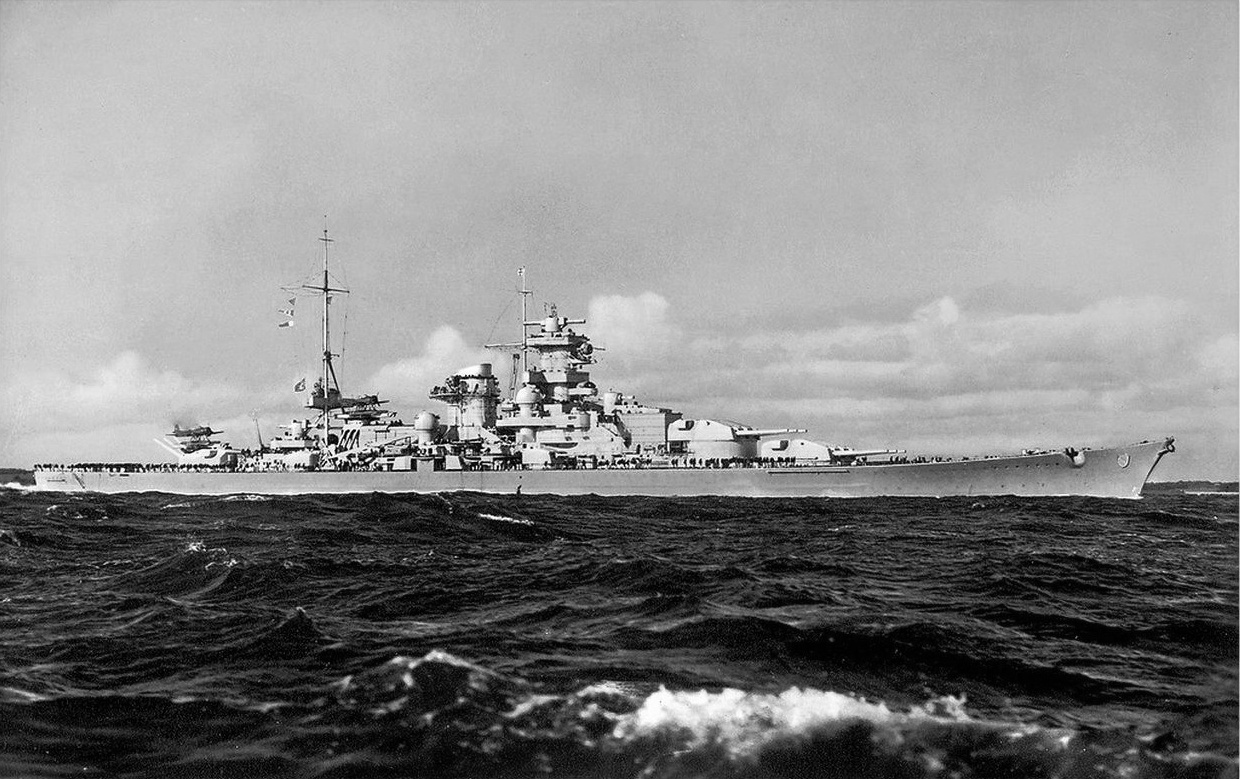
December 26, 1943: 1,907 German sailors drown in the sinking of Scharnhorst

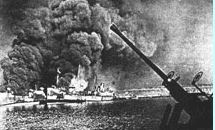
December 2, 1943: Unintended release of mustard gas kills 83 bystanders in Italy

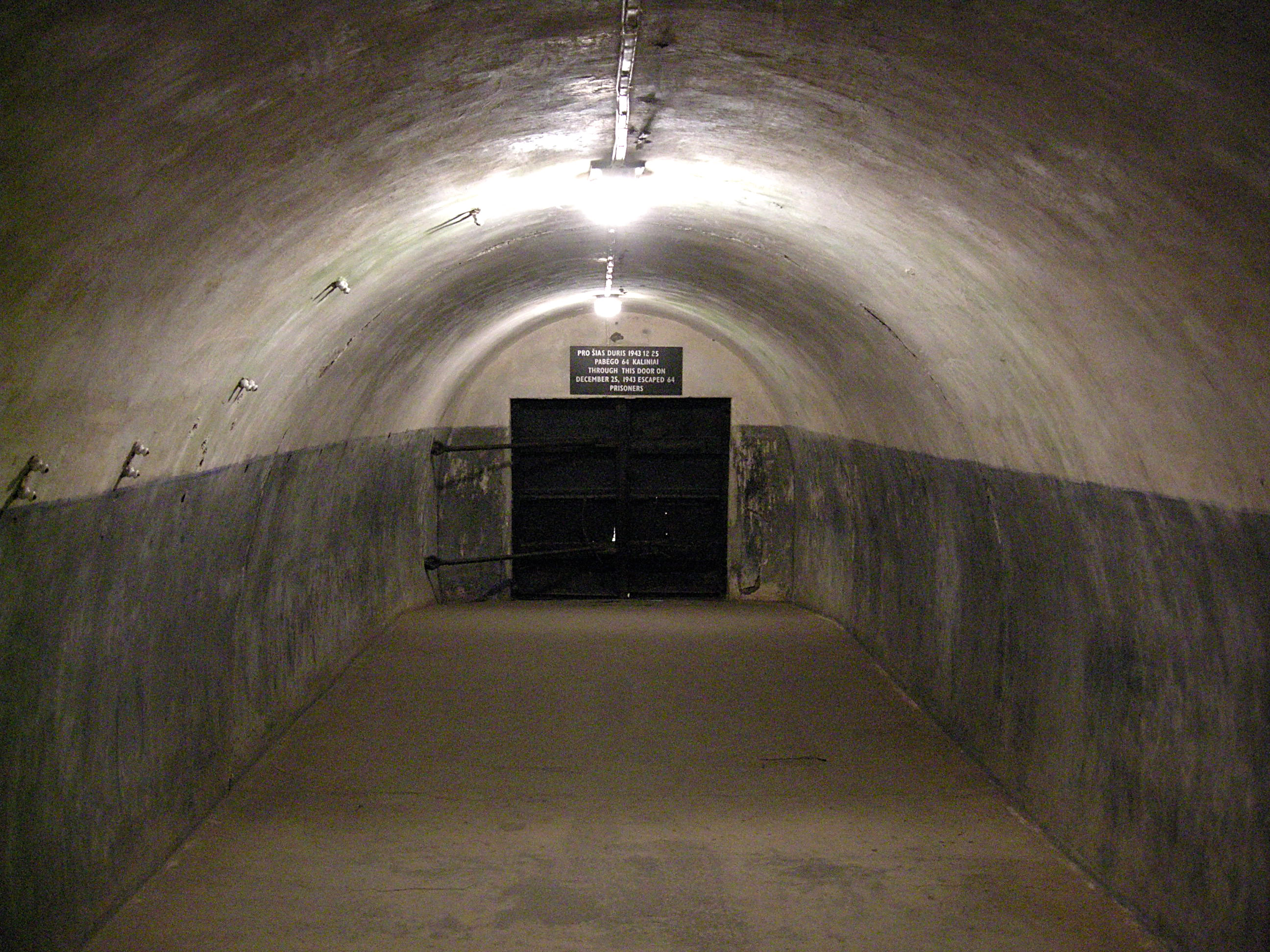
December 25, 1943: 64 Lithuanian Jews tunnel out of Nazi "Ninth Fort" prison

December 4, 1943: WPA, the last Great Depression relief program in the U.S. ends

The following events occurred in December 1943:

== December 1, 1943 (Wednesday) ==
- The Cairo Declaration was released after the departure of U.S. President Franklin D. Roosevelt, British Prime Minister Winston Churchill, and China's President Chiang Kai-shek. For the first time, the Allies demanded the unconditional surrender of Japan, and pledged that the Japanese Empire would be "stripped of all the islands in the Pacific which she has seized or occupied since the beginning of the first World War in 1914", that "all the territories Japan has stolen from the Chinese, such as Manchuria, Formosa, and The Pescadores, shall be restored to the Republic of China" and that "in due course Korea shall become free and independent".
- The neutral Swedish "repatriation ship", the ocean liner MS Gripsholm, docked in the New York harbor with 1,223 American, 217 Canadians, and some Latin American nationals who had been captured by the Japanese during the early years of the war. The Gripsholm, which was allowed safe passage throughout the war by agreement of both the Axis and Allied powers, had brought the North American prisoners home from Mormugao in Portuguese India (now the State of Goa in India), where they had been taken by the Japanese exchange ship Teia Maru on October 16.
- Died: Prince Tisavarakumarn of Siam, 81, Minister of Education who founded the modern Thai educational system. As the Minister of the Interior, Prince Tisavarakumarn also reorganized the national bureaucracy.

== December 2, 1943 (Thursday) ==
- At least 83 people were killed by the release of gas from chemical weapons in the Italian port of Bari, and another 545 were injured, after a surprise air raid by 88 bombers from Germany's Luftwaffe. Unbeknownst to anyone except its commanding officers, the American merchant marine ship SS John Harvey had been carrying a cargo of 2,000 M-47A1 mustard gas bombs. The ship was one of 17 Allied vessels that were sunk in the raid, but had stayed afloat until its deadly cargo had exploded. In that the only people who knew of the ship's cargo had been killed in the blast, physicians were uncertain of the cause of the blisters and burns of their patients until nine days later, when a British diver recovered a shell casing. Ironically, the Bari disaster would eventually converge with another research on cancer chemotherapy started in 1942, because of the findings (made during the attempt at diagnosis) that patients exposed to the sulfur mustard gas had reduced white blood cell counts; with the substitution of nitrogen for sulfur, the first compound that could fight cancer cells with minimal harm to healthy cells was created, with the derivation of the drug Mustine from nitrogen mustard compounds.
- U.K. Labour Minister Ernest Bevin announced that one out of every ten men called up between the ages of 18 and 25 would be ordered to work in British coal mines. These conscript miners would be known as "Bevin Boys".
- Born: William Wegman, American photographer, in Holyoke, Massachusetts

== December 3, 1943 (Friday) ==
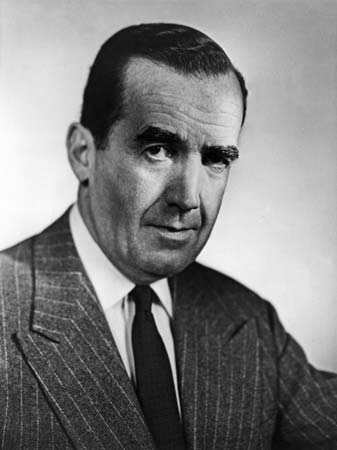
Murrow

- Edward R. Murrow delivered his famous "Orchestrated Hell" broadcast over CBS Radio, describing a nighttime bombing raid on Berlin, by 619 Squadron, RAF, based at RAF Woodhall Spa. The night before, Murrow had been allowed to fly on board a 619 Sqn Avro Lancaster, codenamed "D for Dog", during the raid. Toward the close of his report, Murrow commented "Men die in the sky while others are roasted alive in their cellars. Berlin last night wasn't a pretty sight. In about 35 minutes it was hit with about three times the amount of stuff that ever came down on London in a night-long blitz."
- In Yugoslavia, the German 2nd Panzer Army launched the counter-insurgency operation Operation Kugelblitz.
- On the Belorussian front, Soviet forces captured Dovsk north of Gomel and moved towards Rogachev.
- Major League Baseball Commissioner Kenesaw Mountain Landis convened a meeting between National League and American League team owners, and publishers from eight African-American newspapers, at the Hotel Roosevelt in New York, to discuss the prospects of allowing black players to compete for jobs in the all-white "Organized Baseball". Three press representatives, John Sengstacke of the Chicago Defender, Ira F. Lewis of the Pittsburgh Courier, and Howard Murphy of the Baltimore Afro-American were allowed to address the owners, and asked them to admit black players. Landis declared at the end, "Each club is entirely free to employ Negro players to any and all extent it pleases," but added that it would be "solely for each club's decision", rather than a league-wide mandate.

== December 4, 1943 (Saturday) ==
- In Yugoslavia, the Partisan resistance leader Marshal Josip Broz Tito proclaimed a provisional democratic Yugoslav government-in-exile, with lawyer Ivan Ribar to serve as the head of government after the war's end.
- With unemployment figures falling fast due to war-related employment, President Franklin D. Roosevelt closed the Works Progress Administration, bringing a symbolic end to the Great Depression in the United States.
- The Congress of Bolivia ratified the executive decree by President Enrique Peñaranda after a six-month debate, and declared war against the Axis Powers. In that 70 percent of the wholesale and large retail sellers in Bolivia were German-operated, Bolivian authorities sent supervisors to monitor their work, but elected not to close their operation. Peñaranda's decrees after the declaration of war, however, would lead to his overthrow later in the month. Bolivia became the 44th nation to join the Allies against the Axis nations (Germany, Japan, Italy, Bulgaria, Hungary, Romania, Thailand and Finland). Nine independent nations— Afghanistan, Argentina, Ireland, Portugal, Saudi Arabia, Spain, Sweden, Switzerland and Turkey— remained neutral.
- The Moro River Campaign began in Italy.
- The Japanese escort carrier Chūyō was torpedoed and sunk in the Pacific Ocean by the American submarine Sailfish.

== December 5, 1943 (Sunday) ==
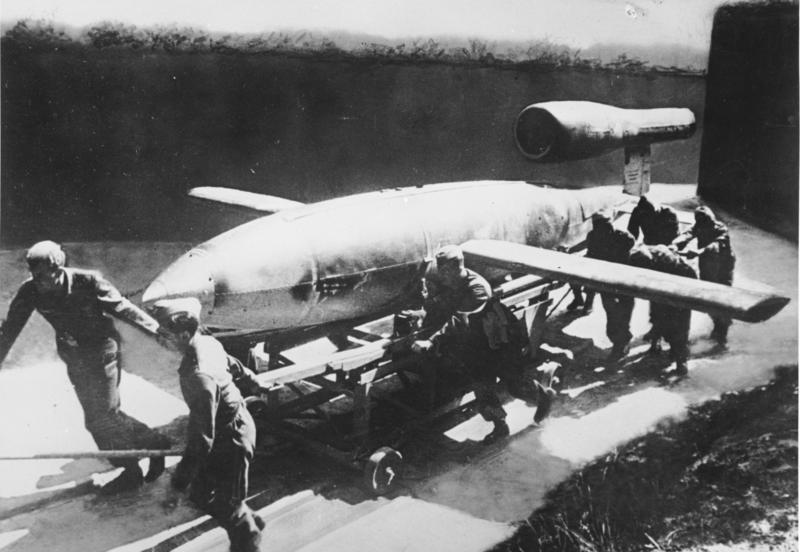
A V-1 rocket

- The Allies began Operation Crossbow in an all-out effort to stop Germany's V-1 rocket program. The first "flying bomb" launch sites targeted were near Ligescourt in France, where U.S. Army Air Force B-26 bombers made an unsuccessful attempt to put a dent in the Nazi guided missile attacks.
- The Battle of Sio began in New Guinea.
- Italian Jews were interned for the first time at the Fossoli di Carpi concentration camp.
- The Indian city of Calcutta (now Kolkata) was attacked in a daylight aerial bombardment for the first time, as Japanese bombers made a brief raid. There had been seven previous bombings of Calcutta, but all had taken place at night. The British Indian government announced that 167 civilians and one soldier were killed.
- Singer Dinah Shore and film actor George Montgomery were married in Las Vegas, while Montgomery was on leave from his wartime service as an officer with the U.S. Army Signal Corps.
- Born: Eva Joly, Norwegian-born French magistrate, European Parliament member, and Green Party candidate for President of France in 2012; in Grünerløkka

== December 6, 1943 (Monday) ==
- The first Jews were shipped out of Italy, as a train took prisoners from Milan and Verona to the Auschwitz concentration camp.
- Between 19 and 29 inmates of the Jaworzno concentration camp were hanged in front of the other internees after their plans to build a tunnel were betrayed to the authorities.
- Soviet troops in the Ukrainian sector captured Znamianka and cut the rail line to Smela.

== December 7, 1943 (Tuesday) ==
- At Tunis, President Roosevelt personally informed U.S. Army General Dwight D. Eisenhower of a transfer from the command of forces in the Mediterranean Theater of Operations to the newly established Supreme Headquarters Allied Expeditionary Force (SHAEF) in London. According to witnesses at the scene, the President told General Eisenhower, "Well, Ike, you are going to command Overlord," the forthcoming Allied invasion of continental Europe.
- Chiara Lubich started the humanitarian Focolare Movement in Trento, Italy.
- The British Eighth Army in Italy captured the town of Poggiofiorito.

== December 8, 1943 (Wednesday) ==
- In Greece, German Major General Karl von Le Suire ordered the burning of the city of Kalavryta and the execution of its male population in reprisal for the execution of 80 German prisoners of war by Greek partisans. Major Hans Ebersberger, the commander of the battalion whose members had been taken prisoner in October, carried out General von Le Suire's order and began by killing 58 men and boys in Rogoi and 37 more in Kerpini as his soldiers marched to Kalavryta.
- The German 117th Jäger Division destroyed the monastery of Mega Spilaio in Greece and executed 22 monks and visitors as part of reprisals that culminated a few days later with the Massacre of Kalavryta.
- The Battle of San Pietro Infine began in the Italian Campaign. It marked the first battle in which Italian troops fought as part of the Allied troops in World War II, following years as enemies.
- President Roosevelt visited Malta and presented a scroll dedicated to its "people and defenders," expressing the admiration of the American people for Malta's contribution to democracy.
- The Allies won the Battle of Wareo.
- Born:
  - Jim Morrison, American rock musician for The Doors, in Melbourne, Florida (d. 1971)
  - José Carbajal, Uruguayan singer, composer and guitarist, in Colonia Department (d. 2010)

== December 9, 1943 (Thursday) ==
- Prime Minister Churchill informed Lord Louis Mountbatten, the Supreme Commander of the Royal Navy's South East Asia Command, that the Allies had agreed to cancel "Operation Buccaneer", the planned British and Indian assault on the Japanese-occupied Andaman Islands.
- During the ongoing German counter-insurgency operation Kugelblitz, the 16th Muslim Brigade (Yugoslav Partisans) counter-attacked and captured Kladanj.
- The Battle of Kočevje began in the Operational Zone of the Adriatic Littoral.
- Born: Rick Danko, bassist, singer, songwriter and member of The Band, in Blaynley, Norfolk County, Ontario, Canada (d. 1999)
- Died:
  - Georges Dufrénoy, 73, French post-Impressionist painter
  - Edgar Allan Woolf, 62, screenwriter who co-wrote the script for The Wizard of Oz with Florence Ryerson; after fracturing his skull in a fall down the stairs of his Beverly Hills home

== December 10, 1943 (Friday) ==
- Tullio Tamburini, the Chief of Police for the Nazi-controlled Italian Social Republic, issued exceptions to the November 30 order to arrest all of the Jews in Italy, and directed the release of any who were over 70 years old, or "grievously ill", or who had a non-Jewish parent or spouse. About forty percent of the recent arrestees were allowed to go home for the time being. Tamburini would be dismissed by the Nazis in April, and would survive his internment at the Dachau concentration camp following his arrest in February 1945.
- The British Eighth Army crossed the Moro River.
- The Mediterranean Allied Air Forces was created, and placed under the overall command of U.S. Army General Ira C. Eaker, replacing the Mediterranean Air Command that had been commanded by General Arthur Tedder of the British Royal Air Force.

== December 11, 1943 (Saturday) ==
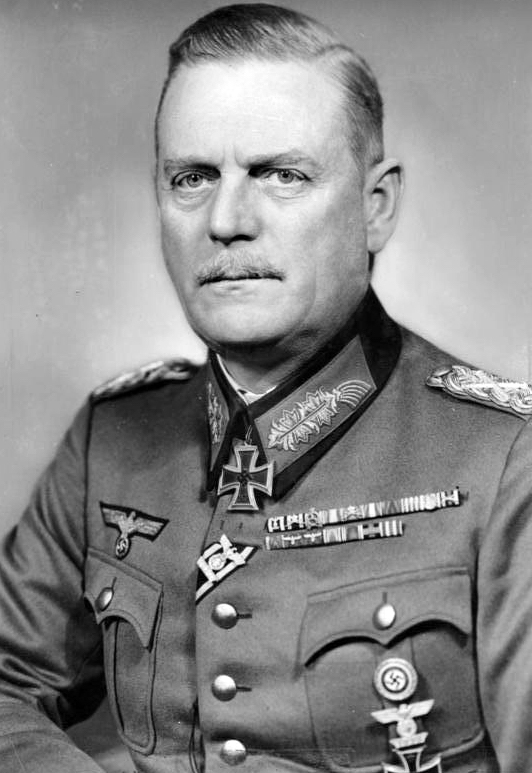
Keitel

- Field Marshal Wilhelm Keitel, leader of Germany's Oberkommando der Wehrmacht (OKW), ordered that V-1 rocket attacks be made on London beginning January 15, 1944, although there were no V-1s yet in production.
- Born: John Kerry, U.S. Secretary of State 2013–2017; Democratic nominee for President in 2004; and U.S. Senator for Massachusetts, 1985–2013; in Aurora, Colorado

== December 12, 1943 (Sunday) ==
- Edvard Beneš, President of the government in exile for Czechoslovakia, signed a "Treaty of Friendship, Mutual Aid, and Postwar Cooperation" with President Mikhail Kalinin of the Soviet Union for an alliance between the two nations that would begin after World War II. The Treaty included a clause promising "mutual respect of their independence and sovereignty and non-interference in the internal affairs of the other"; three years after liberation in 1945, President Beneš would be forced out of office by the Soviet-backed Communist Party of Czechoslovakia, and his own National Social Party would become a satellite party.
- The Battle of Kočevje ended with the relief of the besieged German garrison.
- The Battle of Hellzapoppin Ridge and Hill 600A began on Bougainville Island.
- The German submarine U-593 torpedoed and sank the British destroyers Holcombe and Tynedale off the coast of Algeria.
- Born:
  - Grover Washington, Jr., American saxophonist, in Buffalo, New York (d. 1999)
  - Gianni Russo, American film actor best known for role as Carlo Rizzi in The Godfather, in New York City

== December 13, 1943 (Monday) ==
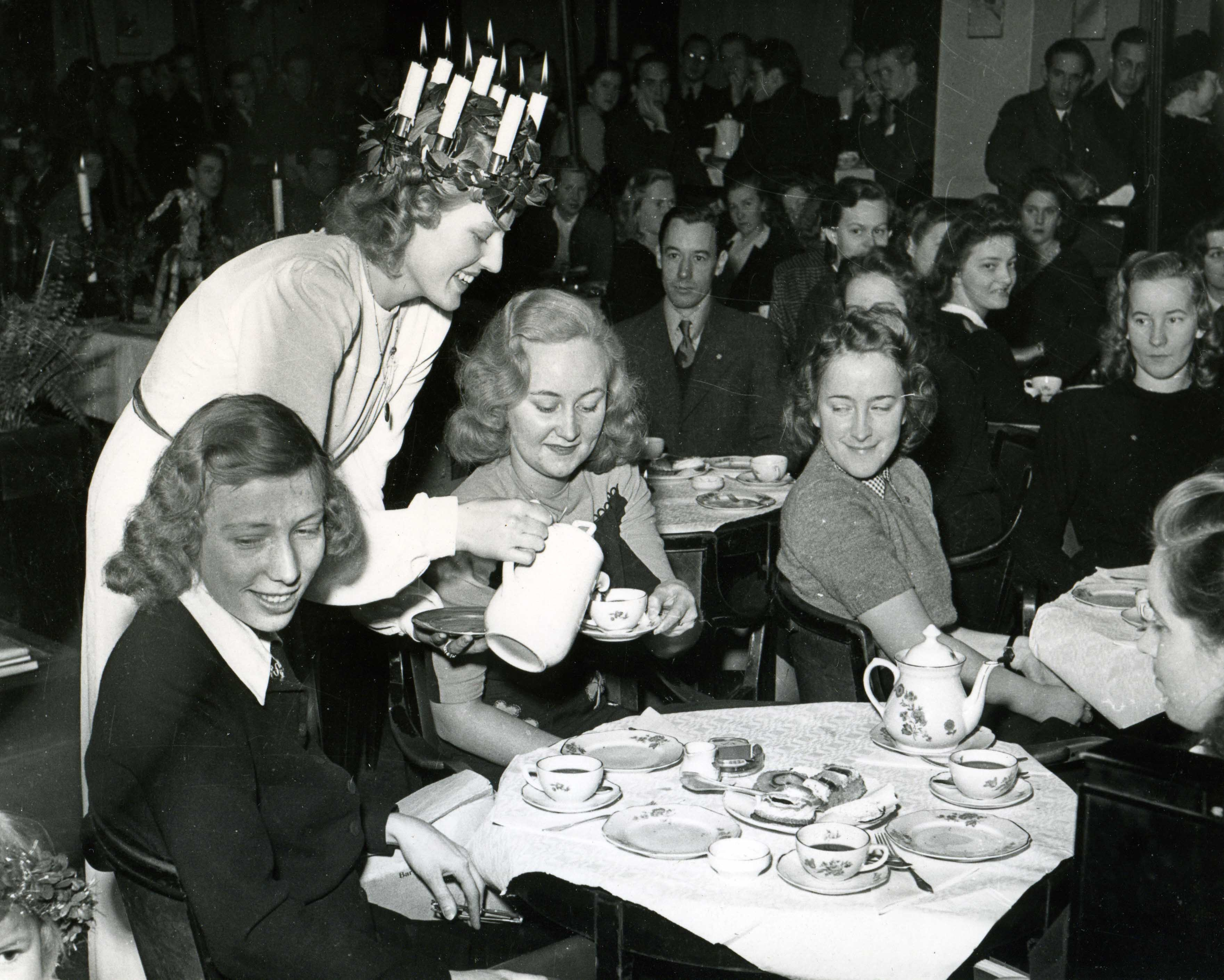
Saint Lucy's Day in Stockholm, Sweden

- The German 117th Jäger Division carried out the destruction of Kalavryta in Greece, rounding up to 460 adult men in the town and executing them with machine gun fire, then burning the town.
- A wave of 1,462 American airplanes flew an early afternoon carpet bombing raid over the German cities of Bremen, Hamburg and Kiel. In a departure from previous missions, all bombers in a unit would release their high explosive bombs and incendiaries, simultaneously, on the population centers.
- The German submarines U-172, U-391 and U-593 were lost to enemy action.

== December 14, 1943 (Tuesday) ==
- The French Committee of National Liberation, government in exile for France, issued a decree granting full French citizenship to those Arabs in Algeria who were classified as "Moslem elites", the criterion being the ability to fluently read and write the French language, and dropped the previous requirement that a prospective citizen "renounce the Koranic law", and added that the attainment of the same rights as "non-Moslem French" people would be granted to Arab Algerians "without abandonment of their personal Koranic status". The order was expected to enfranchise at between 20,000 and 30,000 Algerian Muslims.
- The German Army raided the French town of Nantua, in the Ain département, in retaliation for resistance activities.
- In the heaviest bombardment ever of Greece, more than 300 Allied warplanes dropped bombs on the German Luftwaffe airfields near Athens at Eleusis, Kalamaki and Tatoi, as well as the harbor facilities at Piraeus.
- The Soviet 52nd Army captured Cherkasy.
- Born: Britt Allcroft, writer and producer of Thomas the Tank Engine & Friends, in Worthing (d. 2024)
- Died: John Harvey Kellogg, 91, American physician and nutritionist who created the breakfast cereal corn flakes in 1878, and who founded the Battle Creek Sanitarium as a health resort in Battle Creek, Michigan. He would be portrayed by actor Anthony Hopkins in the 1994 film The Road to Wellville.

== December 15, 1943 (Wednesday) ==
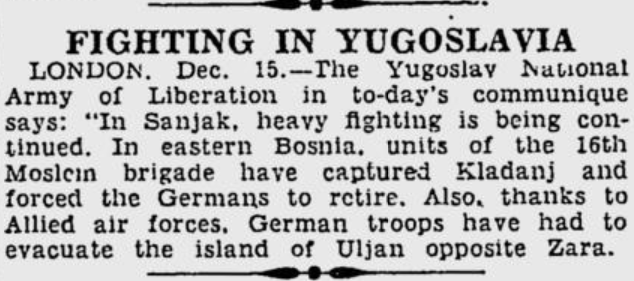
December 15 news report from London, as published the following day in The Indian Express, covering the ongoing fighting in Yugoslavia during Operation Kugelblitz

- The first war crimes trial of World War II began at Kharkov in the Soviet Union, when three German officers and a Russian collaborator were tried for "crimes and atrocities [that are] ... links in a long chain of crimes which have been, and are still being, committed by the German invaders on the direct instructions of the German Government and of the Supreme Command of the German Army." The four men (Abwehr Captain Wilhelm Langheld, SS Lieutenant Hans Ritz, Corporal Reinhard Retzlaff of the Secret Field Police, and Mikhail Bulanov of Kharkov) would be found guilty on December 18 and hanged the next morning, in public, in front of tens of thousands of spectators at Kharkov's main square.
- The New Britain campaign began. American and Australian forces began the Battle of Arawe as a diversion before a larger landing at Cape Gloucester on New Britain in Papua New Guinea.
- The biographical film Madame Curie, starring Greer Garson and Walter Pidgeon as Marie Curie and Pierre Curie, was released.
- Born: Lucien den Arend, Dutch geometric abstract sculptor, in Dordrecht
- Died: Fats Waller (Thomas Wright Waller), 39, African-American jazz pianist and composer, of pneumonia, after collapsing on a train at Kansas City, Missouri.

== December 16, 1943 (Thursday) ==
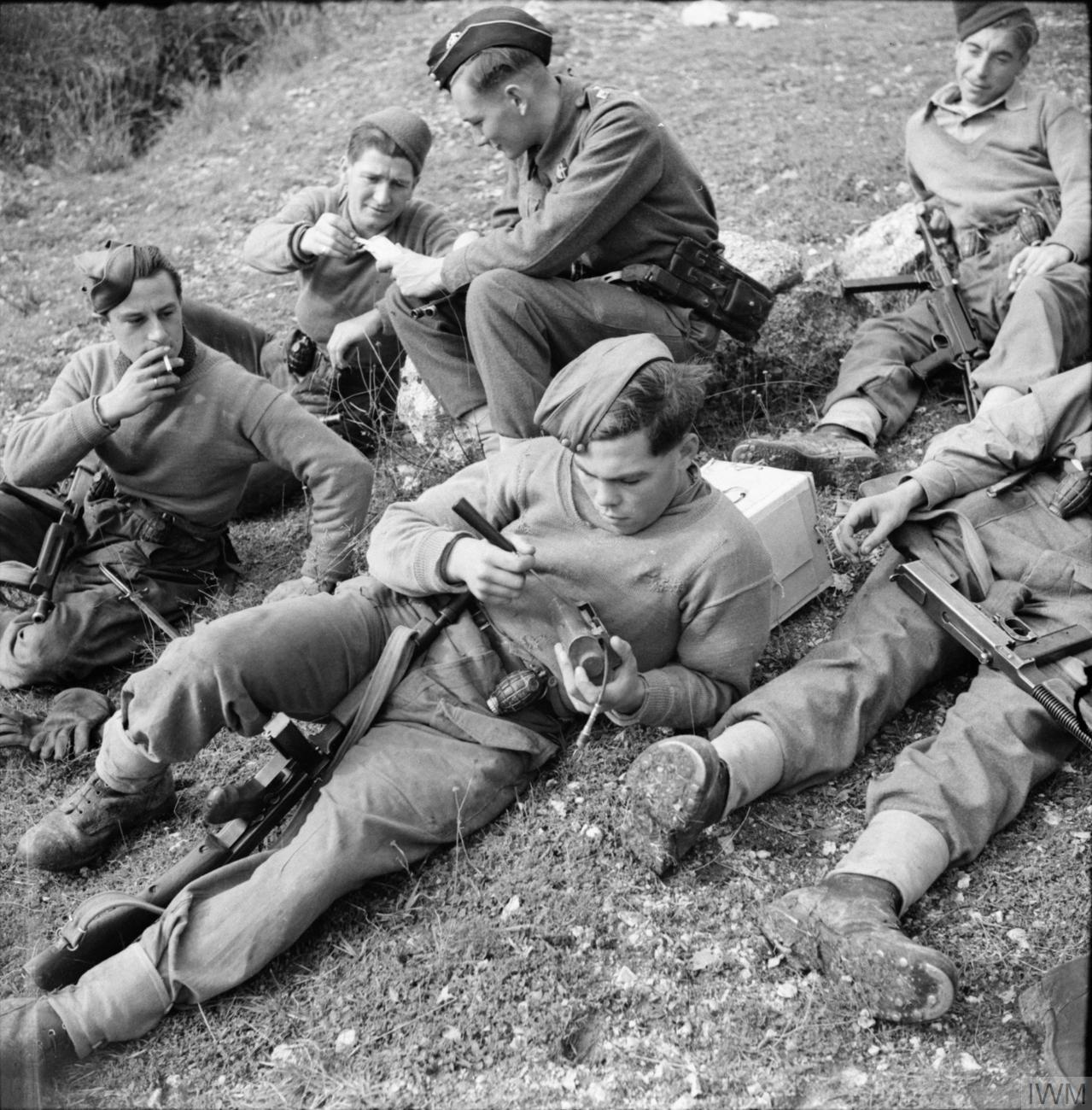
A battle patrol of the 1st Battalion, East Surrey Regiment rest after returning from enemy territory in Italy

- Seventy-three train passengers were killed and another 187 injured in the collision of two Atlantic Coast Line Railroad trains near Lumberton, North Carolina. At about 1:15 a.m., the Tamiami West Coast Champion, with 18 cars, derailed as it was traveling south during a snowstorm, and two Pullman sleeper cars and the diner car were knocked across the northbound track. Thirty-five minutes later, the Tamiami East Coast Champion, with 16 cars, moved past warning signals and crashed at full speed into the first train. Both trains had been traveling between New York City and Miami when their paths crossed in North Carolina.
- Elfriede Scholz, the sister of Erich Maria Remarque (the German-born author of All Quiet on the Western Front), was beheaded after being convicted in the German "People's Court" (Volksgerichtshof) of "undermining the war effort" by failing to denounce her famous brother, who had become successful in the United States. Judge Roland Freisler told Elfriede Remark Scholz, "Your brother is beyond our reach, but you will not escape us."
- The German submarine U-73 was sunk off Oran, Algeria by American warships.
- Born: Patti Deutsch, voice artist and comedic actress, in Pittsburgh, Pennsylvania (d. 2017)

== December 17, 1943 (Friday) ==
- The Chinese Exclusion Act of 1882, along with its amendments, which had limited the number of immigrants from China to the United States to only 105 persons per year, was repealed as President Roosevelt signed the Magnuson Act into law.

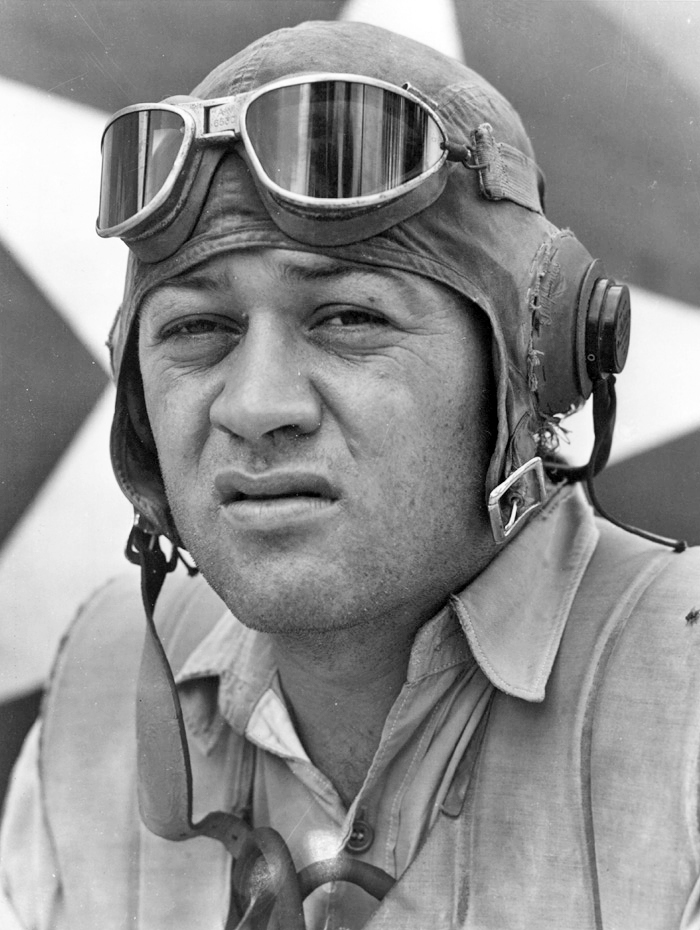
Boyington

- U.S. Marine Colonel Gregory "Pappy" Boyington led Marine Attack Squadron 214, the "Black Sheep Squadron" in the first use of the "fighter sweep technique" in combat, sending 76 fighters over the Japanese air station at Rabaul in New Guinea.
- The Battle of San Pietro Infine ended in Allied victory.
- The romantic film Immensee, based on an 1849 novel by Theodor Storm and directed by Veit Harlan, was released throughout Germany and became that nation's most popular film of the year. Well after the end of World War II, the classic film would be a favorite of a new generation of German viewers on television.
- On the fortieth anniversary of the Wright Brothers' historic first flight at Kitty Hawk, North Carolina, President Roosevelt announced that the Wrights' airplane would be returned to the United States from storage in England, and donated to the Smithsonian Institution. The Wrights had allowed the aircraft to go overseas after the Smithsonian had refused to recognize the Wrights as the makers of the first flight, crediting Samuel Langley instead.
- Born: Ron Geesin, Scottish musician and songwriter for Pink Floyd; in Stevenston

== December 18, 1943 (Saturday) ==
- Heinrich Himmler ordered new rules for arrest and deportation of Jews in Germany, revoking most previous exemptions for Jews who had married Gentiles. Most Jewish spouses were ordered deported to the nominally Jewish city of Theresienstadt in January, rather than immediately to concentration camps. Exceptions continued to be made, however, for intermarried couples who had lost a son in combat, and for those who had very young children at home.
- The Japanese destroyer Numakaze was torpedoed and sunk east of Naha, Okinawa by the American submarine Grayback.
- German SS soldiers carried out the Drakeia massacre in Greece, executing 118 men as part of so-called anti-partisan reprisals.
- Born:
  - Keith Richards, English rock guitarist and songwriter for the Rolling Stones; in Dartford, KentKeith Richards, with James Fox, Life (Back Bay Books, 2010) p. 21
  - Bobby Keys, American saxophonist who backed up the 1988 debut album of Richards as a solo artist, Talk Is Cheap, as well as numerous other classic rock acts (including songs on 11 Rolling Stones' albums); in Slaton, Texas (d.2014)

== December 19, 1943 (Sunday) ==
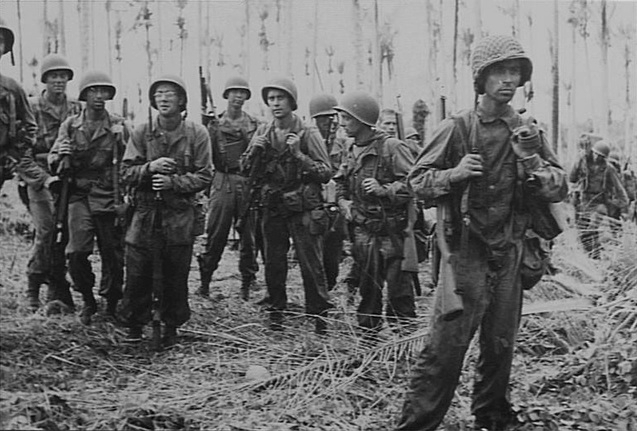
American soldiers returning to positions at Arawe after completing a patrol

- On the Philippines' Panay Island, ten American Baptist missionaries, three other Americans and two children were captured by the Japanese Army after having hidden for two years, and became the Hopevale Martyrs the next day, volunteering to be executed in return for the Japanese allowing their Filipino captives to go free. The following day, after being granted an hour to pray, the adults, ranging in age from 59 to 39, were beheaded by sword, and the two children, including a nine-year-old boy, were bayoneted.
- American forces at Arawe, New Guinea captured the Japanese airstrip and held it against counterattacks.
- Born:
  - Sam Kelly, English television sitcom actor, as Roger Michael Kelly in Manchester (d. 2014)
  - Jimmy Mackay, Scottish-born Australian footballer and midfielder for the Australia national soccer team in the 1974 World Cup (d. 1998)
  - James L. Jones, U.S. Marine Corps general who served as Commandant of the Corps and later as the Supreme Allied Commander Europe (2003–2006) and the U.S. National Security Advisor during 2009 and 2010; in Kansas City, Missouri

== December 20, 1943 (Monday) ==
- In an act of mercy that would be written about nearly 70 years later in the popular book A Higher Call: An Incredible True Story of Combat and Chivalry in the War-Torn Skies of World War II, German Luftwaffe Oberleutnant Franz Stigler, a fighter ace with 22 victories, declined to shoot down the severely damaged American B-17 bomber Ye Olde Pub, and instead escorted the plane until it left German airspace. The American plane, piloted by 2nd Lieutenant Charlie Brown, had been on its first mission and was shot up before it could release its cargo of bombs. Flying back to England, it landed safely at its base at RAF Seething. Forty-seven years later, Brown would locate his benefactor, and he and Stigler would remain close friends until their deaths in 2008.
- A colonel in Germany's SS intelligence division prepared a special report to his superiors outlining the requirements for a future invasion of Switzerland, which remained neutral during World War II.
- Sixteen days after guiding Bolivia into World War II, President Enrique Peñaranda was overthrown in a military coup led by Major Gualberto Villarroel. Less than three years later, on July 21, 1946, Villarroel himself would be assassinated in another revolution.
- The Battle of Ortona began between Canadian and German forces in Italy.
- The German submarine U-850 was sunk in the Atlantic Ocean by U.S. aircraft from the escort carrier Bogue.
- Born: Jacqueline Pearce, English TV actress best known as the villainess "Servalan" on Blake's 7; in Woking (d. 2018)
- Died: Captain Edward L. Beach Sr., 76, U.S. Navy officer and author

== December 21, 1943 (Tuesday) ==
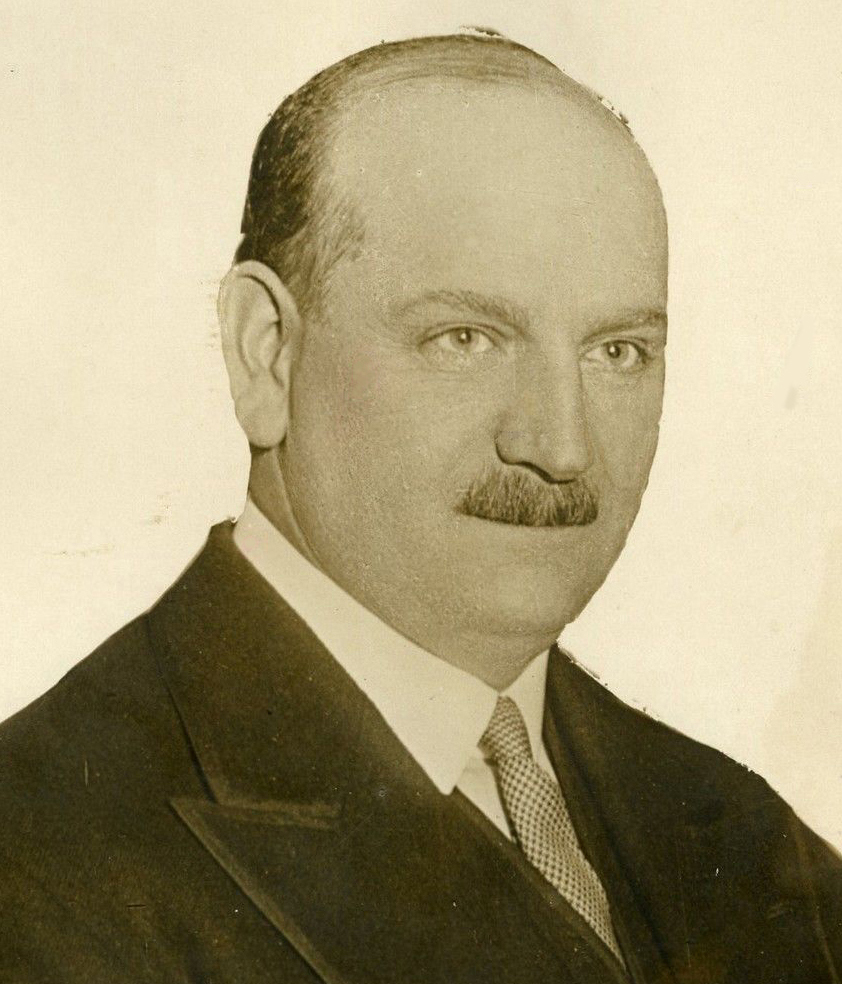
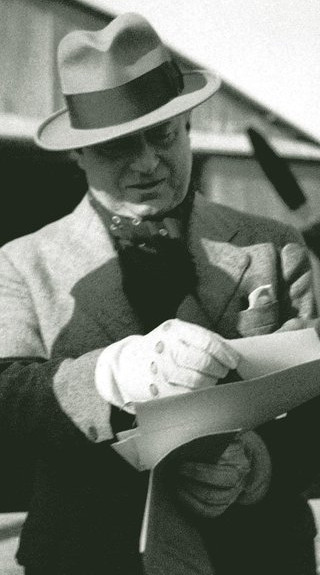
Collaborators Flandin and Peyrouton
- Pierre-Étienne Flandin, a former Prime Minister of France, was arrested in Algiers along with four other one-time Vichy France government officials who had collaborated with the German occupiers of France. Flandin had headed the government in 1934 and 1935, and then served again for two months as premier of the Vichy government. Jailed also were former Interior Minister Marcel Peyrouton, Information Secretary Pierre Tixler-Vignacourt, member of parliament André Albert, and Pierre François Boisson, the recent Governor-General of French West Africa.
- The German submarine U-284 was scuttled after suffering storm damage in the Atlantic Ocean southeast of Greenland.
- Born:
  - Jack Nance, American film and TV actor, in Boston (d. 1996)
  - Albert Lee, English guitarist, in Lingen, Herefordshire

== December 22, 1943 (Wednesday) ==
- Hitler issued a "Führer Order" (Führerbefehl) creating the "National Socialist Leadership Officers", charged with disseminating propaganda for "getting soldiers to believe in final victory" in the war "even if they did not know how it was going to be achieved".
- The German government ordered that all boys aged 16 and older would be required to register for military duty in January.
- The Second Battle of Kiev ended in Soviet victory.
- The German light cruiser Niobe was sunk by British motor torpedo boats three days after running aground off Silba, Yugoslavia.
- Born: Gareth Morgan, Welsh-Canadian organizational theorist who developed the theory of "organizational metaphors" as a tool of management; in Porthcawl
- Died:
  - Beatrix Potter, 77, children's book author known for the Peter Rabbit series, died of leukemia
  - U.S. Army Lt. Col. William E. Dyess, 27, nicknamed the "One Man Scourge" for his fight against the Japanese in the Battle of Bataan. Dyess survived the Bataan Death March, then was able to escape the prisoner of war camp and to reveal the details of the march to the world press, but was killed when the P-38 airplane he was piloting caught on fire as he flew over Burbank, California. In an apparent effort to avoid crashing into houses, Dyess stayed with his plane and aimed for a vacant lot, clipping the roof of the St. Finbar's Catholic Church in his descent.

== December 23, 1943 (Thursday) ==
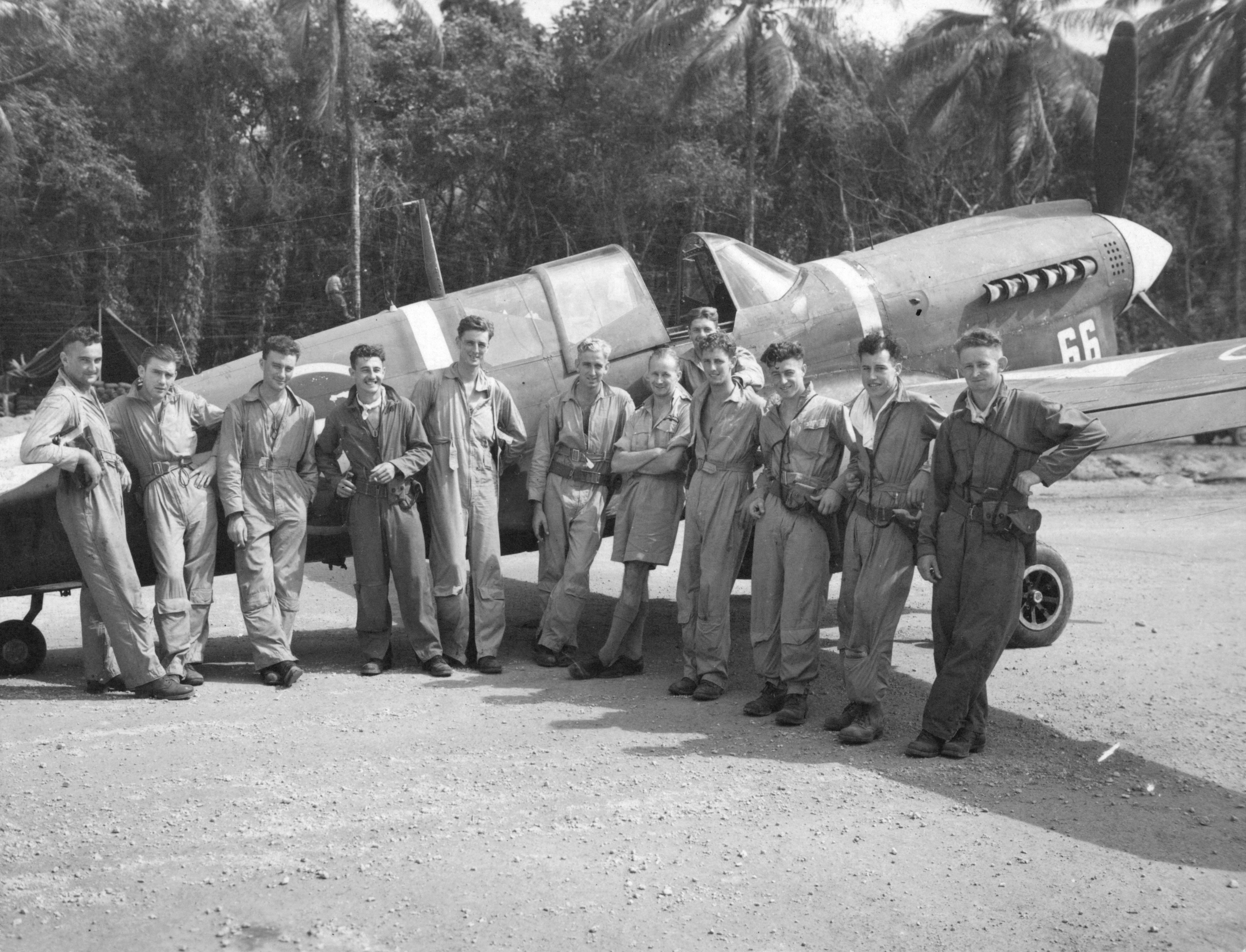
No. 17 Squadron RNZAF pilots at Ondonga on New Georgia

- With one week remaining before a nationwide strike, three of the five rail unions rejected President Roosevelt's offer of arbitration of a wage dispute, and the President ordered Attorney General Francis Biddle to prepare papers to authorize a government seizure of United States railroads on December 30.
- The Battle of the Dnieper ended in Soviet victory.
- The British destroyer Worcester struck a mine in the North Sea and was rendered a constructive total loss.
- Born:
  - Harry Shearer, American comedian, actor and screenwriter, in Los Angeles
  - Elizabeth Hartman, American film actress, in Youngstown, Ohio (d. 1987)

== December 24, 1943 (Friday) ==
- In a nationwide radio address on the afternoon of Christmas Eve, President Roosevelt announced that U.S. General Dwight D. Eisenhower would command the Allied invasion of continental Europe during the coming year.
- A fire at a transient lodging house in New York City killed 19 residents. The five-story Standard Hotel, located at 439 West 42nd Street, was gutted after a blaze began in a storage room shortly after midnight, and had 370 people in it at the time.
- The Battle of Hellzapoppin Ridge and Hill 600A ended in Allied victory.
- Soviet forces began the Dnieper–Carpathian Offensive.
- The American destroyer USS Leary was torpedoed and sunk in the Atlantic Ocean by German submarine U-275.
- The British destroyer Hurricane was torpedoed in the Atlantic Ocean by German submarine U-415 and scuttled the next day.
- The German submarine U-645 was depth charged and sunk northeast of the Azores by the American destroyer Schenck.
- Born: Tarja Halonen, 11th President of Finland, from 2000 to 2012; in Kallio

== December 25, 1943 (Saturday) ==
- Allied bombardment of Berlin was temporarily halted after a week of raids by the Royal Air Force and the U.S. Army Air Forces that had ended with a heavy attack on the morning of Christmas Eve that killed more than 2,000 people. At the same time, no German bombers flew over the United Kingdom.
- Sixty-four prisoners tunneled their way out of the Ninth Fort, a prison in German-occupied Lithuania near Šilainiai, used primarily for the housing of Lithuanian Jews until they could be murdered. By mid-January, 32 of the prisoners had been recaptured and five were killed while trying to get away. In all, 40,000 people would be murdered at the Fort, 25,000 of them from the Jewish community in Kaunas, 10,000 Jews deported from Germany, Austria and Czechoslovakia, and thousands of Jewish prisoners of war from the Red Army. Obersturmfuhrer Franz Radif, the operator of the camp, was arrested for negligence but pardoned by Adolf Hitler after two months; after the war ended, Radif would be tried and executed in Czechoslovakia on January 8, 1947.
- The drama film The Song of Bernadette starring Jennifer Jones had a double world premiere at the United Artists Theatre and the Carthay Circle Theatre in Hollywood.
- Born: Hanna Schygulla, German film actress, in Königshütte, Germany (now Chorzów, Poland)
- Died: William Irving, 50, German-born American film actor (b. 1893)

== December 26, 1943 (Sunday) ==
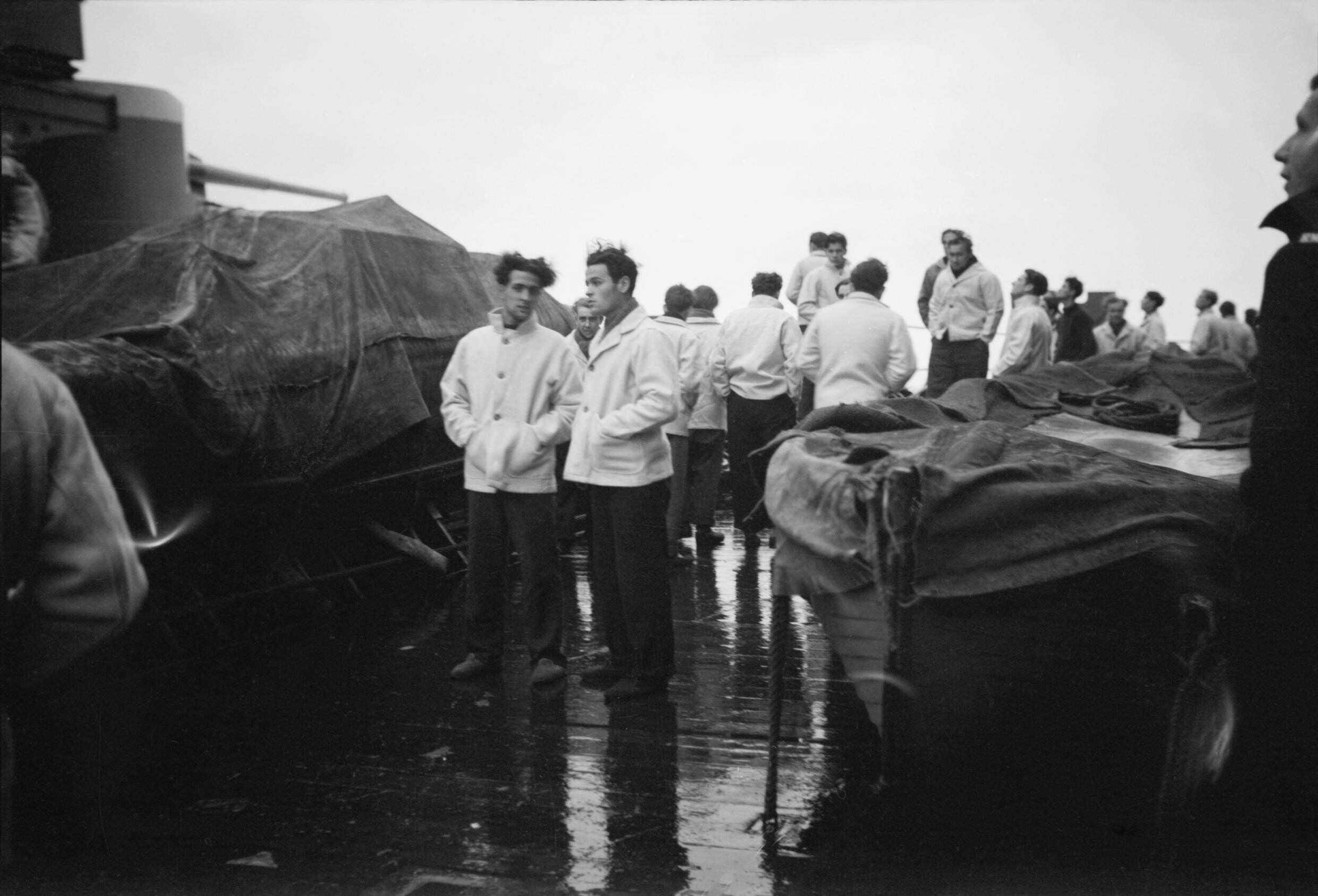
Survivors from Scharnhorst

- The German battleship Scharnhorst was torpedoed and sunk during the Battle of the North Cape by the British battleship HMS Duke of York, with the loss of 1,907 (all but 36 of her crew of 1,943) German officers and sailors. Among the dead was Konteradmiral (Rear Admiral) Erich Bey, 45, the commander of the German Navy's destroyer forces.
- The Moro River Campaign ended in a stalemate.
- The Battle of Cape Gloucester began between Japanese and Allied forces on New Britain.
- The American destroyer Brownson was bombed and sunk off Cape Gloucester, New Britain by Japanese aircraft.
- For the first time, the NFL Championship Game was played after Christmas. A crowd of 34,320 turned out at Wrigley Field to watch the hometown Chicago Bears beat the Washington Redskins, 41–21.
- Died: Russell H. Chittenden, 87, American biochemist

== December 27, 1943 (Monday) ==
- President Roosevelt signed an order seizing the railroads of the United States in advance of a December 30 strike of rail workers, and at 7:00 pm Washington time, soldiers from the U.S. Army began taking control of lines affected by the impending walkout. It was the first government control of the rails since December 26, 1917, when President Woodrow Wilson had acted during World War One. Control would end after an agreement between the unions and management on January 18.
- The Battle of The Pimple began in New Guinea.
- Born: Martha Shelley, American lesbian activist and writer, as Martha Altman in Brooklyn
- Died: Rupert Julian, 64, New Zealand-born film director and actor

== December 28, 1943 (Tuesday) ==
- The Battle of the Bay of Biscay was fought between British and German warships. The result was a victory for the Royal Navy as two German torpedo boats and the destroyer Z27 were sunk with no British losses in return.
- The Battle of The Pimple ended in Allied victory.
- The Battle of Ortona ended in Canadian victory.
- One day after abolishing the Kalmyk Autonomous Soviet Socialist Republic, the Soviet Union began the forced relocation of the roughly 100,000 people of the Kalmyk ethnic group to various locations in Siberia, after accusing members of the predominantly Buddhist minority of collaboration with the Germans during the war. The surviving exiles would be allowed to return in 1957, and the Kalmyk ASSR would be granted autonomy again in 1958. Over a four-day period from December 28 to December 31, the Kalmyks of the former ASSR and from the Rostov oblast would be removed.
- U.S. Army Lt. Douglas McDow and aviation cadet Clarence A. Thompson vanished during a training mission while flying a UC-78 Bobcat airplane after taking off from an army air base near Douglas, Arizona. For more than 30 years, their fate remained unknown. In late April, 1974, two hikers would find the wreckage and the men's remains in the Mount Graham mountain range.
- Born:
  - Keith Floyd, English restaurateur and TV chef, in Reading, Berkshire (d. 2009)
  - Richard Whiteley, English presenter and journalist, best known for hosting the game show Countdown, in Bradford (d. 2005)
  - Craig MacIntosh, American newspaper comics illustrator best known for Sally Forth, in Long Beach, California

== December 29, 1943 (Wednesday) ==
- Leo Pasvolsky of the U.S. State Department finished the draft proposal for the basic organization of the United Nations Charter, which Secretary of State Cordell Hull presented to President Roosevelt. Under Pasvolsky's plan, a "General Assembly", with representatives from all nations, would vote on most matters; a four-member "Executive Council" (composed of the four Allied Powers, the United States, the United Kingdom, the Soviet Union and France) would vote on security matters, with the right of any one member to veto a decision; and a World Court would decide matters of international law. In the final version of the UN Charter, the Executive Council would be renamed the Security Council, and would include China as a fifth member.
- In one of his first acts as the Supreme Commander of Allied Forces in Europe, General Eisenhower cabled an order to all of the Allied Commanders directing them to, as far as possible, avoid attacking the historic monuments of Italy. "Today we are fighting in a country which has contributed a great deal to our cultural inheritance," Eisenhower wrote. "We are bound to respect those monuments so far as war allows. If we have to choose between destroying a famous building and sacrificing our own men, then our men's lives count infinitely more and the buildings must go. But the choice is not always so clear-cut as that. In many cases the monuments can be spared without any detriment to operational needs."
- Bombing of Berlin resumed after a Christmas halt, in one of the heaviest raids by the Royal Air Force up to that time, dropping incendiaries through a thick layer of clouds during a nighttime attack.
- On the Ukrainian front the Soviet 60th Army recaptured Korosten, while the 40th Army took Skvyra.
- The Axum, one of the more successful Italian submarines of the war, was scuttled after running aground off the Morea, Greece.
- Born: Rick Danko, Canadian singer and musician (The Band), in Blayney, Ontario (d. 1999)

== December 30, 1943 (Thursday) ==
Territory (in red, bottom right hand corner) of "independent" Republic of India

- Subhas Chandra Bose declared a small portion of India independent in a flag raising ceremony at Port Blair on the Japanese-occupied South Andaman Island, more than 200 miles from the mainland of British India at Burma, and 500 miles from the mainland of modern-day India. Japan's occupation of India was limited to the Andaman and Nicobar Islands, which President Bose renamed "Swaraj" and "Shahid", respectively.
- General Eisenhower traveled to the headquarters of France's General Charles de Gaulle at Algiers, and agreed to de Gaulle's request that French troops be allowed to accompany the other Allied forces during the liberation of Paris.
- The Soviets continued to advance in the Ukrainian sector as the 1st Tank Army drove the German XLVIII Panzer Korps out of Koziatyn.
- Born: Mercer Mayer, American children's author known for the "Little Critter" series of books, in Little Rock, Arkansas.
- Died: Hobart Bosworth, 76, American film actor, director and producer

== December 31, 1943 (Friday) ==
- Adolf Hitler delivered a New Year's message to the German people admitting that 1943 "brought us our heaviest reverses," and that 1944 "will make heavy demands on all Germans. This vast war will approach a crisis this year. We have every confidence that we will survive." Hitler stated that it was no news that the English intended to carry out a landing somewhere, but assured the German people that defences had been prepared that would "surprise our enemies more than their landings would surprise us."
- British Deputy Prime Minister Clement Attlee broadcast a New Year's Eve message of his own to the people of the United Kingdom. Attlee declared that the "hour of reckoning has come" for the Nazis but urged the British people not to be complacent, stating: "We do know that in 1944 the war will blaze up into greater intensity than ever before, and that we must be prepared to face heavier casualties. Nineteen-forty-four may be the victory year; it will only be so if we continue to put forward our utmost efforts, and if we allow nothing to divert us from our main purpose."
- Zhytomyr changed hands again as the Soviet 1st Ukrainian Front recaptured the city.
- Argentina's President, General Pedro Ramírez, issued various year-end decrees, dissolving all political parties and (on the recommendation of the Education and Justice Minister, novelist Hugo Wast) restoring the requirement of Roman Catholic education in all Argentine public schools.
- Born:
  - John Denver, American singer, songwriter and film actor, as Henry John Deutschendorf, Jr., in Roswell, New Mexico (killed in plane crash, 1997)
  - Sir Ben Kingsley, English film actor and Academy Award winner (for Gandhi), as Krishna Bhanji, in Snainton
  - Pete Quaife, rock bassist and founding member of The Kinks, in Tavistock, England (d. 2010)
