= Oskar von Niedermayer =

German general, super-spy, and professor

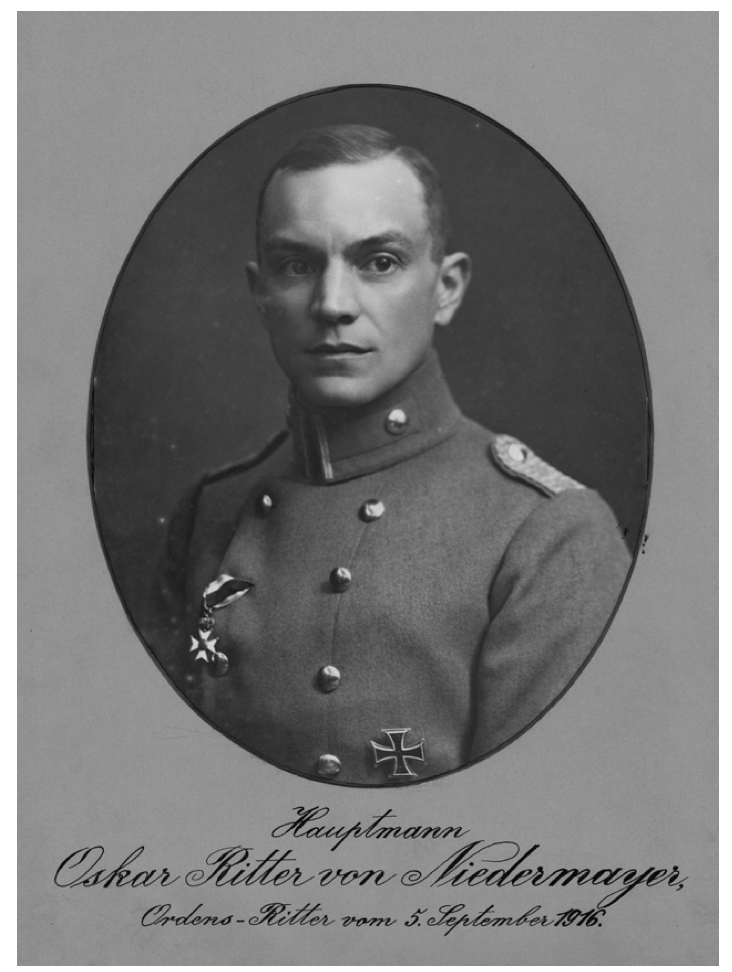
Portrait of Oskar von Niedermayer with Military Order of Max Joseph

Oskar Ritter von Niedermayer (8 November 1885 – 25 September 1948) was a German general, professor and a German spy. Sometimes referred to as the German Lawrence (just like Wilhelm Wassmuss), Niedermayer is remembered for having led the 1915–1916 Persian and Indo-German-Turkish mission to Afghanistan and Persia during World War I in an endeavor to incite the Emir Habibullah Khan to attack British India, as a part of the Persian and Hindu German Conspiracy as an adjunct to the German War effort. Between the World Wars, Niedermayer was the Reichswehr's representative in the Soviet Union and later associated with the Ludwig-Maximilians-Universität München and the Friedrich Wilhelm University of Berlin.

== Early life and career ==
Oskar Niedermayer came from a Regensburg official and merchant family. On 15 July 1905, he joined the 10th Bavarian Field Artillery Regiment (Erlangen) as an Officer Cadet. After being promoted to Lieutenant, he received within the Army the educational opportunity to study Natural Sciences, Geology and philology at the University of Erlangen. He was guided by Georg Jacob, a philologist of Semitic cultures, and picked up 'fairly fluent English and Russian, passable Arabic and Turkish and modern Persian.' Subsequently, whilst retained on full military pay he asked for, and was granted, a two-year research trip furlough (Разведка) from the Army during which he traveled through Persia and India. His stated intent was to carry out excavations and study Islamic practices in Persia - though military intelligence must have figured in the decision to give him two years of paid leave. He sketched relief maps of the area between Tehran and the Caspian. Niedermayer is the first known European to cross the Lut Desert. Having reached Asterabad in the spring of 1913, he spent nearly five months compiling a huge dossier on Shia practices for German intelligence. In May 1913, he met Percy Sykes, Britain's super-spy in Persia. Sykes did not believe Niedermayer's cover story that he was in Persia to carry out geological and anthropological investigations for a moment. Niedermayer travelled next to Isfahan, and then to Bushire. In February 1914, he was debriefed by Wilhelm Wassmuss who was so impressed by him that he recommended him, in August 1914, to Max von Oppenheim as the man to lead the German Afghan mission.

Shortly before the outbreak of World War I, in May 1914 he returned to Europe. On 15 December 1914, the German Military Command dispatched Niedermayer with a small expeditionary military team to Afghanistan with the aim of forging an alliance with the indigenous populations there using his knowledge of their culture to try to incite a revolt against the British Empire's presence in India & Persia, in a similar strategy to that which would later be used by Lawrence of Arabia against the Ottoman Empire during the Arab revolt. On 26 September 1915, the Niedermayer-Hentig Expedition reached Kabul, but despite his efforts nothing of a decisive practical nature emerged from his work with Emir Habibullah. In May 1916, he and his team received orders to withdraw from Afghanistan and attach itself to the authority of the Ottoman Empire, involving a dangerous return march through hostile Russian territory, which was accomplished on 1 September 1916. On arrival Niedermayer received orders from the German Military Mission to the Ottomans, commanded by Field Marshal Baron Colmar von der Goltz, that he was to commence similar work to that which he had attempted in Afghanistan amongst the Arabic tribes within Ottoman Imperial territory aimed at targeting the British Imperial authority in the Middle East. In early 1918 he was recalled to Germany, arriving in Berlin at General Headquarters on 28 March. Niedermayer was awarded for his work in the Orient the Militär-Max-Joseph-Orden and subsequently posted with the rank of Captain to the Western Front, where he took part in fighting in the Champagne and Flanders before the war ended in November 1918.

== Between wars ==
At the end of World War I, Niedermayer was on leave and had an opportunity to recommence his academic life at the Ludwig-Maximilians-Universität München studying Literature and Geography for two more semesters. Whilst there he obtained a D.Phil. summa cum laude. During this period also, commencing on 29 April 1919, he was appointed Director of the Publicity Department of Freikorps Epp, the Munich City Council's Republican Force. On 12 December 1919, Niedermayer returned to the Army from academe. Initially he served in the H.Q. of the 23rd Division and was adjutant to Reichswehr Minister Otto Gessler. On 23 December 1921, Niedermayer ostensibly resigned from the army, but this was used as cover for work in the, at that time, unofficial Soviet Union Section of the German Army. Until 1932 he worked in the Reichswehr office in Moscow, when he returned to Germany and officially rejoined the Wehrmacht, being assigned to the 2nd Prussian Artillery Regiment. On 29 January 1933, he again resigned from active service with the rank of lieutenant colonel, and turned to a scholastic career. On 31 July 1933, he presented a thesis entitled Growth and Migration in the Russian Nation and took up a position as a lecturer in Geography and at the Friedrich Wilhelm University of Berlin. On 27 July 1937, at the express request of Adolf Hitler, Niedermayer took up a teaching post at the Institute for Compulsory Military Doctrine at the Friedrich Wilhelm University of Berlin. Meanwhile, he had re-enlisted on 1 November 1935 as a reserve officer in the Army. On 1 October 1939 he was called up from the Reserve List and appointed to a post as Colonel in the supreme command of the Wehrmacht (OKW).

== World War II ==
On the outbreak of the War the Nazi leadership sought to utilize Niedermayer's knowledge of Slavic culture to assist with the management of occupation of Poland, however, he used personal contacts amongst the Army general staff to agitate for a more active role in the war for himself. Nevertheless, he again rejected the High Command of the Army's request on 20 February 1941. Thus Niedermayer turned down on 25 May 1941 again personally to Wilhelm Keitel (1882–1946), the chief of OKW. Admittedly, he had the opportunity to participate in some courses, but until 30 May 1942 Niedermayer stayed with the leadership of the 162nd Turkoman Division instructed. This was not a regular Division, but simply a bar, which was scheduled, in the hinterland of the Army Group in the South of Ukraine, from (Caucasian, Turkestani, Georgian, Armenian) POWs troops formed against the Soviet Union's advance in Ukraine. This task was transferred to him, because he was known in the previous years, due to many articles and memoirs as a connoisseur of the geography and peoples of the profiled regions. The division was first installed in Ukraine, where they and Niedermayer were responsible for the training of the so-called "Ostlegionen", until February 1943, and from then to autumn of 1943 they were reinstalled in Neuhammer German Reich. There the Legion was reclassified as a Division, but it was still made of Caucasian, Georgian and Turkotartari soldiers. As commander of this division in Operational Zone of the Adriatic Littoral, he fought against Slovene Partisans in the Battle of Kočevje, rescuing the besieged garrison in Kočevje.

In March 1944, the Ostlegionen relocated to Italy, to try to halt the Allied advance there as a part of the 10th Army, the Division deployed in Italy on 9 June 1944 on an increasingly precarious front, however Niedermayer by this time was no longer its Commander, having been replaced on 21 May 1944 on the orders of Field Marshal Albert Kesselring, who had few weeks before in a written personal assessment of Niedermayer reported: "His education is above average... It is, however, more of a scholastic nature than of use in a practical fighting command application. in decision-making he is hesitant, and his command leadership style is too slow in reaction." (Cited in: Seidler, Franz W.: Oskar Ritter von Niedermayer im Zweiten Weltkrieg, in: Wehrwissenschaftliche Rundschau 20 (1970), S. 203.) Niedermayer now became the commander of voluntary associations by the Supreme Commander of Weststaggered. The details of his work there are not known. However, in August 1944, he had come to a view which was disparaging of Hitler's Ostpolitik. Two officers of his staff reported this to the Nazi Authorities and Niedermayer was arrested and charged with advocating defeatism against Nazi Germany. He was Court Martialed at Torgau. Numerous friends and associates, including Heinrich Himmler, provided character references during the hearing stating Niedermayer's merits and history of service to Germany, but he was jailed and not released from Torgau prison until end of the war. After the capitulation of Germany on May 9, 1945, whilst attempting to return to his hometown of Regensburg, at Carlsbad the Red Army arrested him, and he was deported to the U.S.S.R, and a Moscow prison, where he contracted tuberculosis. A Russian court martial sentenced him to 25 years in prison, which he was sentenced to serve in the prison of Vladimir (German: Wladimir), where he died on 25 September 1948 in the prison's hospital.

== Works ==
- My return from Afghanistan, Munich 1918.
- The inland basins of the Iranian high country, Munich 1918.
- Afghanistan, Leipzig 1924.
- Under the scorching sun: Iran war experiences of the German expedition to Persia and Afghanistan, Dachau 1925.
- Brigade Geographical consideration of the Soviet Union, Berlin 1933.
- Soviet Russia - A geopolitical problem, Berlin 1934.
- Brigade Policy -- An introduction and definition, Leipzig 1939.
- Geographic Atlas of France, Berlin 1939.
- Soldiering and Science, Hamburg 1940.
- Brigade Geographic Atlas of Great Britain, Berlin 1940.
- War and Science, in: The Kingdom 21 / 1941.
- Brigade Geographic Atlas of the Union of Soviet Socialist Republics, Berlin 1941.
- Geography Department, Berlin 1942.

== Trivia ==
In the volume "Event Horizon" (2003) of the poet Henning Heske there is a cycle of poems about the turbulent life of this recent German "knight".

== Literature ==
- Seidt, Hans-Ulrich (2001), "From Palestine to the Caucasus-Oskar Niedermayer and Germany's Middle Eastern Strategy in 1918.German Studies Review, Vol. 24, No. 1. (Feb., 2001), pp. 1–18", German Studies Review, German Studies Association, doi:10.2307/1433153, ISSN 0149-7952, JSTOR 1433153.
- Hughes, Thomas L (2002), "The German Mission to Afghanistan, 1915–1916. German Studies Review, Vol. 25, No. 3. (Oct., 2002), pp. 447–476.", German Studies Review, German Studies Association, ISSN 0149-7952
- Peter March:The first World War, Germany between the long 19th century and the short 20th century, Ernst birds, Munich, 2004, ISBN 3-89650-193-3
- Franz W. Seidler: Ritter Oskar Niedermayer of the Second World War, in:brigade Scientific Rundschau 3/1970, 4/1970
- Hans-Ulrich Seidt:Berlin, Kabul, Moscow. Oskar Niedermayer Knights of geopolitics and Germany. Universitas Verlag, Munich 2002. ISBN 3-8004-1438-4
