= November 1943 =

Month of 1943

<<	November 1943					>>
Su	Mo	Tu	We	Th	Fr	Sa
	1	2	3	4	5	6
7	8	9	10	11	12	13
14	15	16	17	18	19	20
21	22	23	24	25	26	27
28	29	30

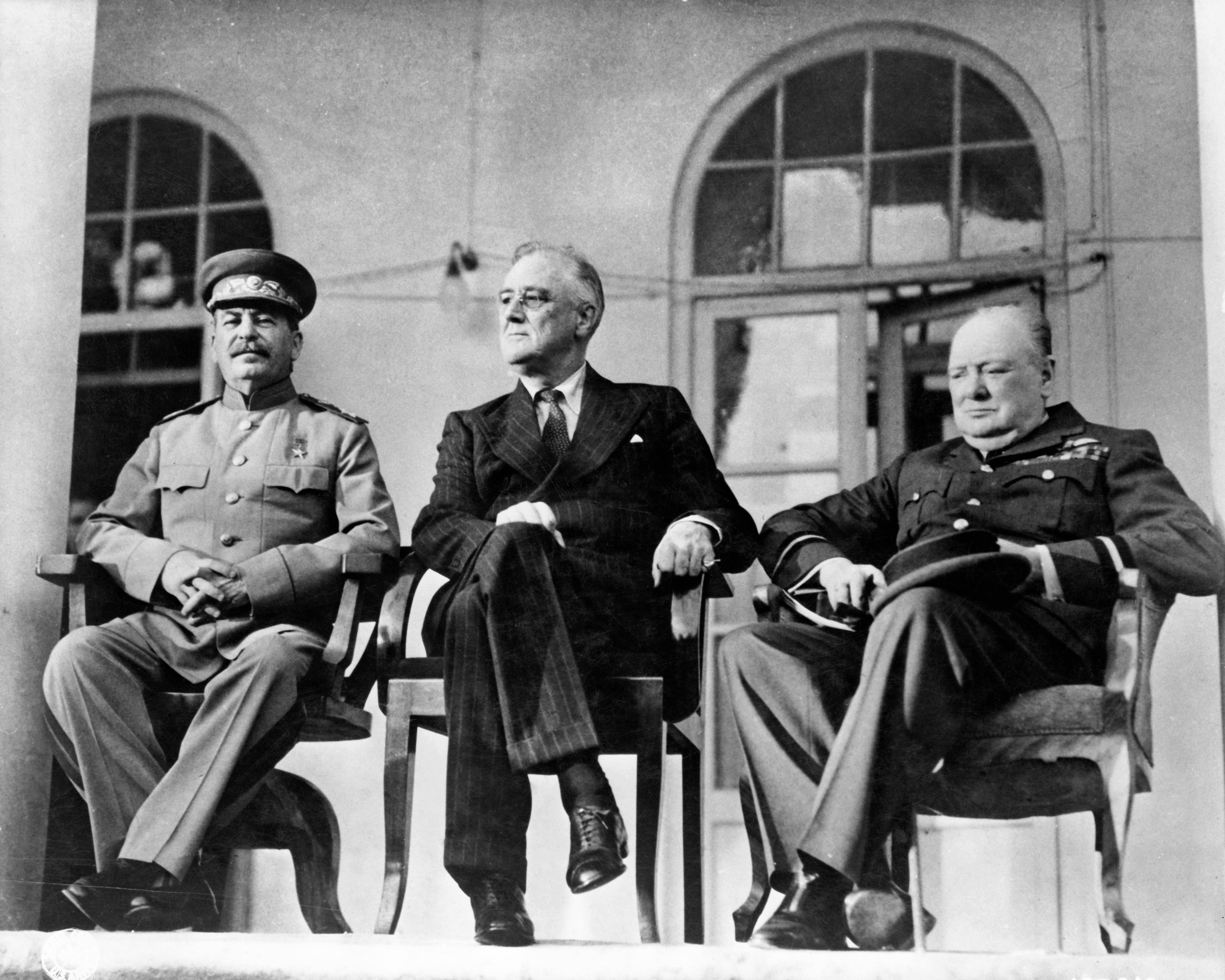
November 28, 1943: Joseph Stalin, Roosevelt, and Churchill meet for Tehran Conference

November 22, 1943: Chiang Kai-shek, Franklin D. Roosevelt and Winston Churchill meet at the Cairo Conference

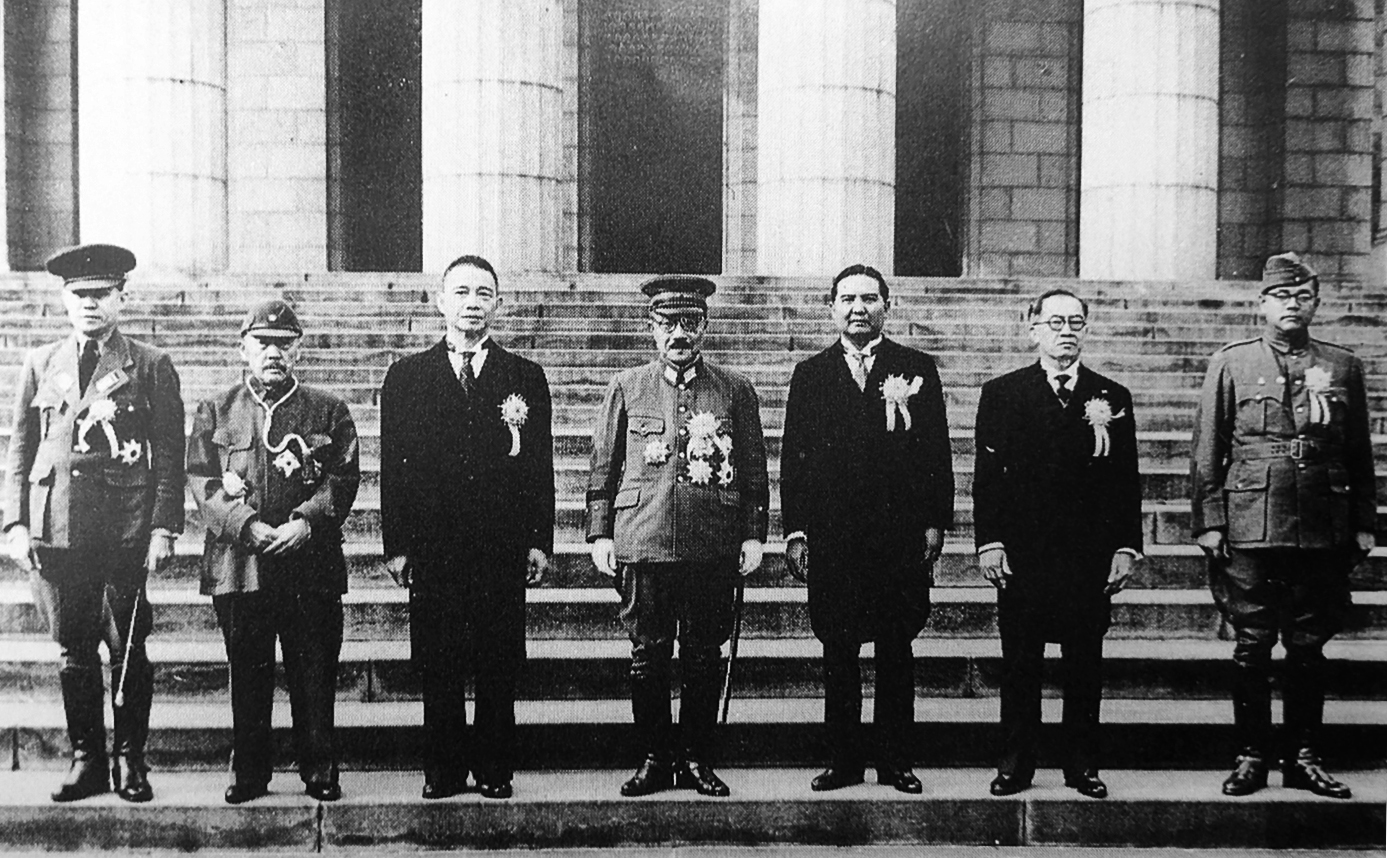
November 6, 1943: Japan's Hideki Tojo hosts puppet state leaders at Greater East Asia Conference in Tokyo

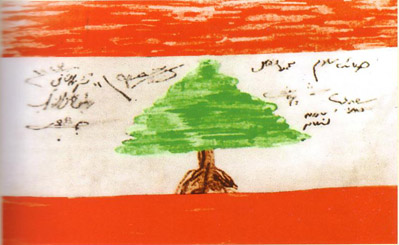
November 8, 1943: Lebanon's leaders briefly declare independence (shown is the parliament members signed drawing)

The following events occurred in November 1943:

== November 1, 1943 (Monday) ==
- In California, thousands of Japanese-American internees at the Tule Lake Segregation Center surrounded the administration building during a visit to the internment camp by War Location Director Dillon S. Myer. Leaders of the Daihyo Sha Kai, a group of inmates who spoke for their fellow prisoners, had spread the word during lunchtime that Myer had arrived at 11:00 a.m., and called upon families to assemble for a peaceful protest. By 1:30 p.m., there were between 5,000 and 10,000 men, women and children standing outside the camp headquarters. "Completely surrounded by thousands of evacuees and virtually imprisoned in the administration building, Dillon Myer consented to see the Negotiating Committee", while young men were stationed outside the building exits "to see that no Caucasian left". Myer and the Center Director then conferred with spokesman George Kuratomi about the internees' grievances and pledged to make improvements, and the protesters returned to their barracks.
- In Operation Cherryblossom, a contingent of 14,000 United States Marines landed on Bougainville Island in the Solomon Islands, coming ashore in the Landings at Cape Torokina at Empress Augusta Bay.
- The American destroyer USS Borie and German submarine U-405 engaged in a fierce battle in the Atlantic Ocean. The Borie took severe battle damage after depth charging and ramming U-405; both ships had to be scuttled after the battle.
- Born: Jacques Attali, French economist, first president of the European Bank for Reconstruction and Development; in Algiers, French Algeria

== November 2, 1943 (Tuesday) ==
- The Battle of Empress Augusta Bay took place as the Imperial Japanese Navy responded to the surprise invasion of Bougainville Island by sending the heavy cruisers Myōkō and Haguro, the light cruisers Agano and Sendai, and six destroyers. Task Force 39 of the U.S. Navy had four light cruisers and eight destroyers to defend the U.S. Marine beachhead, and the naval battle began at 2:50 am. An author notes that "The key advantage that the Americans had was radar, and ... radar was a battle winner," as the Japanese fleet had to maneuver around the 25 torpedoes fired at them, and some of their ships collided. While the U.S. suffered only light damage in comparison, the two Japanese heavy cruisers were severely damaged, and the Sendai and the destroyer Hatsukaze were sunk.
- The Allied Bombing of Rabaul began.
- The U.S. Fifth Army in Italy reached the Garigliano River.
- The German submarine U-340 was damaged by British warships and aircraft off Punta Almina, Morocco and scuttled.

== November 3, 1943 (Wednesday) ==
- The Second Battle of Kiev began on the Eastern Front.
- More than 18,000 Jewish prisoners were shot to death in a single day at the Majdanek concentration camp in Poland, in the Aktion Erntefest. The Erntefest was the traditional German "Harvest Festival", and dance music was played over loudspeakers "to drown out the sounds of the killing and the dying". The extermination of the estimated 18,400 members of the camp was carried out by order of the new camp commandant, German Lt. Colonel Martin Weiss, as part of Operation Reinhard. A further 6,000 were murdered at Trawniki concentration camp.
- Adolf Hitler issued Führer Directive Number 51, anticipating an invasion of Nazi-occupied France by the United States, the United Kingdom and Canada, in what Hitler described as "an Anglo-Saxon landing". Troops and reinforcements were transferred to Western Europe, and the "Anglo-Saxon landing" would eventually take place on June 6, 1944.
- The Raid on Choiseul ended indecisively.
- Born: Bert Jansch, Scottish folk musician; in Glasgow (d. 2011)

== November 4, 1943 (Thursday) ==
- After the executions of over 1,000 Jewish prisoners in the Szebnie concentration camp in Poland, an uprising broke out among the remaining group. It was quickly suppressed by the German SS guards; the camp was closed the next day and the 3,000 prisoners were shipped to the Auschwitz concentration camp.
- The U.S. War Department concluded a top secret analysis of American strategy in the war in the Pacific, and concluded that it would be impractical to attack Japan from mainland China. Instead, it was recommended that troops and equipment be shifted to the ongoing effort to capture islands within striking distance of the Japanese Home Islands.
- The British Eighth Army in Italy captured Isernia and San Salvo Ridge as the Germans withdrew to the Sangro.

== November 5, 1943 (Friday) ==
- Despite its neutral status in World War II, Vatican City had four bombs dropped upon it from an unidentified airplane at 8:10 pm . Windows and glass were broken at St. Peter's Basilica and at the Palace of the Governorate, and there was damage to the Vatican aqueduct, but nobody was injured. A British Royal Air Force bomber near Rome had been given clearance to unload its bombs after developing engine trouble, and released them "without quite knowing where it was" but no Allied bombing raids had been scheduled for Rome that day.
- The German submarine U-848 was depth charged and sunk in the South Atlantic off Ascension Island by American aircraft.
- The war film Guadalcanal Diary starring Preston Foster, Lloyd Nolan and William Bendix was released.
- The horror film Son of Dracula starring Lon Chaney Jr. was released.
- Born:
  - Sam Shepard, American film actor and playwright who won both an Academy Award (in 1983 for The Right Stuff) and a Pulitzer Prize (in 1979 for Buried Child); in Fort Sheridan, Illinois (d. 2017)
  - Chef Tell (stage name for Friedman Paul Erhardt), German-American chef and television personality; in Stuttgart (d. 2007)
- Died: Bernhard Lichtenberg, 67, German Roman Catholic priest and martyr who would be beatified in 1943, died while being transported in a cattle car to the Dachau concentration camp. His funeral in Berlin would be attended by more than 4,000 mourners, despite his open opposition to the Nazi government.

== November 6, 1943 (Saturday) ==
- The Soviet Red Army liberated Kiev, the Ukrainian capital, from Nazi Germany.
- The Greater East Asia Conference concluded in Tokyo as Japan and its puppet states finished a two-day conference and issued a formal declaration of principles for the Japanese-occupied Greater East Asia Co-Prosperity Sphere. Japan's Prime Minister Hideki Tōjō chaired the meeting, along with Greater East Asia Minister Kazuo Aoki and Foreign Minister Mamoru Shigemitsu. Representing the other five Sphere members were: Zhang Jinghui, Prime Minister of Manchukuo; Wang Jingwei, President of the "Reorganized National Government of China" governed from Nanjing; Prince Wan Waithayakon, envoy from Japan's ally, the Kingdom of Thailand; Ba Maw, the Prime Minister of the State of Burma; and José P. Laurel, President of the Second Philippine Republic.
- American destroyer USS Beatty was torpedoed and sunk off the coast of Algeria by Junkers Ju 88 aircraft.
- The German submarines U-226 and U-842 were both sunk in the Atlantic Ocean by British warships.
- "Paper Doll" by the Mills Brothers" hit #1 on the Billboard singles chart.
- Born: Ken Patera, U.S. Olympic weightlifter, professional wrestler and strongman; in Portland, Oregon

== November 7, 1943 (Sunday) ==
- The Soviet 1st Tank Army captured Fastiv near Kiev.
- The last NFL game to end in a scoreless tie (0–0) was played. A crowd of 16,992 watched the action (or lack of it), as the Detroit Lions and the visiting New York Giants were unable to make much progress during the rain on a muddy field. Neither team got within 15 yards of the other's end zone. Augie Lio of the Lions missed field goal attempts from 32, 50 and 25 yards out, and the Giants missed one.
- Born:
  - Joni Mitchell, Canadian rock and folk singer and songwriter, 8-time Grammy Award winner, and Rock and Roll Hall of Fame inductee; as Roberta Joan Anderson in Fort Macleod, Alberta
  - Stephen Greenblatt, Pulitzer Prize winning author; in Cambridge, Massachusetts
  - Michael Spence, American economist and 2001 Nobel Prize winner; in Montclair, New Jersey.
- Died:
  - Dwight Frye, 44, American character actor in horror films; in Salina, Kansas
  - U.S. Marine Sergeant Herbert J. Thomas, 25, was killed in combat during the Battle of Koromokina Lagoon on Bougainville Island. While leading a charge against Japanese machine gun positions, Sgt. Thomas threw his body on top of a live hand grenade in order to protect his men from the explosion. He would posthumously be awarded the Medal of Honor for his heroism.

== November 8, 1943 (Monday) ==

- The middle eastern nation of Lebanon had been operated for more than 20 years under the "French Mandate" set up by the League of Nations, with an elected legislature and a president whose roles were to advise the French High Commissioner. When the new Commissioner, Jean Helleu, refused to agree to a revision of his role, the legislators unanimously passed a bill to end the Mandate. The vote was 48–0, and President Bechara El Khoury signed it immediately, leading to a retaliation by the French.
- Radio Moscow broadcast news from the newly liberated capital of Ukraine, and reported that only one Jew had been left alive in Kiev. Before the German invasion, the city's Jewish population had been 140,000.
- The Battle for Piva Trail began between American and Japanese forces on Bougainville Island.

== November 9, 1943 (Tuesday) ==
- The United Nations Relief and Rehabilitation Administration was created by an agreement signed by representatives of 44 Allied nations, in Atlantic City, New Jersey. While the founding of the United Nations would not happen until 1945, the UNRRA was the first agency to become a component of the UN, with the initial goal of providing relief to refugees and homeless persons "in the still to be liberated states of Europe and Asia".
- U.S. Senate Resolution 203 was introduced, calling for the first time for a federal plan "to save the surviving Jewish people of Europe from extinction at the hands of Nazi Germany." Resolution 203 was a bipartisan measure penned by Senators Guy Gillette of Iowa, Elbert D. Thomas of Utah, and Edwin C. Johnson of Colorado, all supporters of the "Bergson Group". On the same day, U.S. House of Representatives Resolutions 350 and 352 were introduced, calling for a new agency to resettle the surviving Jewish refugees in neutral nations.
- The two-day Battle for Piva Trail ended in Allied victory.
- The German submarine U-707 was depth charged and sunk east of the Azores by a B-17 of No. 220 Squadron RAF.
- Died: Josef Szombathy, 90, Austro-Hungarian archaeologist

== November 10, 1943 (Wednesday) ==
- The four Lübeck martyrs were executed after being convicted of treason in show-trials by Nazi Germany's "People's Court". Three Roman Catholic priests (Johannes Prassek, Eduard Müller and Hermann Lange) and an Evangelical Lutheran pastor, Karl Friedrich Stellbrink, were taken to the guillotine at Holstenglacis Prison in Hamburg. The four beheadings were performed at intervals three minutes apart and the bodies were cremated a few days later.
- Soviet paratroopers landed near Cherkasy.
- Born: Saxby Chambliss, U.S. Senator from Georgia 2003 to 2015; in Warrenton, North Carolina
- Died: Alberto Jonás, 75, Spanish pianist and composer

== November 11, 1943 (Thursday) ==
- Three days after the French Mandate of Lebanon was repealed by the legislators and president, agents of the French colonial Sûreté force raided homes in the early morning hours and arrested President El Khoury, Prime Minister Riad Al Solh, and all but two members of the Cabinet (including future president Camille Chamoun). Later in the day, High Commissioner Helleu announced on the radio that he had suspended the Lebanese constitution, dissolved the Chamber of Deputies, and had appointed Émile Eddé as the new president.
- The Red Army captured the northern Ukrainian city of Radomyshl.
- The bombing of Rabaul ended in Allied victory. By the battle's end, nearly every Japanese ship in the harbor had been disabled or sunk, including the destroyer Suzunami.
- The drama war film Sahara, starring Humphrey Bogart as an American tank commander during the Western Desert Campaign, was released.

== November 12, 1943 (Friday) ==
- The Battle of Leros began as German troops invaded the Greek Aegean island of Leros. The landing force arrived at dawn with massive air support.
- The Battle of the Treasury Islands ended in an Allied strategic victory.
- The final aerial bombardment of Darwin, the capital of Australia's Northern Territory, took place. Starting on February 19, 1942, Darwin had been bombed on 63 different occasions by Japan before the tide had turned during World War II.
- The first aerial bombardment of Arezzo, the capital of Italy's province of the same name, took place, as Allied forces struck at its large railway yard in the evening, killing one person. On the next raid, 60 people were killed, and bombing runs escalated as World War II.
- The German submarine U-508 was depth charged and sunk in the Bay of Biscay by an American B-24.
- Born:
  - Wallace Shawn, American film and television actor; in New York City
  - Valerie Leon, English actress known for Carry On, The Spy Who Loved Me, and Never Say Never Again)

== November 13, 1943 (Saturday) ==
- Construction was completed on the XP-80, the prototype for the Lockheed P-80 Shooting Star, the first successful American jet fighter, 140 days after the work had started. An earlier attempt, the Bell P-59 Airacomet, had been tested but not put into service.
- U.S. President Franklin D. Roosevelt and his advisers secretly boarded the USS Iowa at Hampton Roads, Virginia to begin a heavily protected sea voyage to North Africa, en route to a summit conference at Cairo with British Prime Minister Winston Churchill and Chinese President Chiang Kai-shek.
- One week after the Red Army had recaptured Kiev, the German Wehrmacht began a counterattack that would last for forty days before being abandoned.
- Soviet forces reached Zhytomyr, threatening the northern flank of Army Group South.
- Operation Crossbow continued attacks on Germany's secret missile program. Earlier in the year, Douglas Kendall, who oversaw aerial photography and analysis for the Royal Air Force, had ordered an examination of the Peenemünde Army Research Center in Germany, after hearing rumors of a "pilotless aircraft" that was being developed by the Nazi Luftwaffe.
- The British submarine Taurus sank the Japanese submarine I-34 in the Strait of Malacca.
- The British destroyer HMS Dulverton was scuttled off Leros after being bombed by Dornier Do 217 aircraft of the Luftwaffe with Henschel Hs 293 glide bombs.
- The Battle of the Coconut Grove began between U.S. and Japanese forces on Bougainville Island.
- No. 198 Squadron RAF from Royal Air Force Manston attacked two ferries, SS Minister C. Lely and SS Willemstad, near Numansdorp, the Netherlands, killing thirteen Dutch civilians and a German soldier.
- In an unusual college football game, the Ohio State Buckeyes and the Illinois Illini were tied 26 to 26, and the Buckeyes' pass on the last play fell incomplete. The players left the field, and most of the 36,331 spectators filed out of the stands. Twelve minutes later, the players were told to return to the field. None of the fans, coaches or players had realized that an official had called an off-sides penalty against the Illini, and two seconds were put back on the clock. With its second chance, Ohio State kicked a field goal for a 29–26 win.
- Born: Roberto Boninsegna, Italian National Team footballer; in Mantua
- Died: Maurice Denis, 72, French painter and art theorist

== November 14, 1943 (Sunday) ==
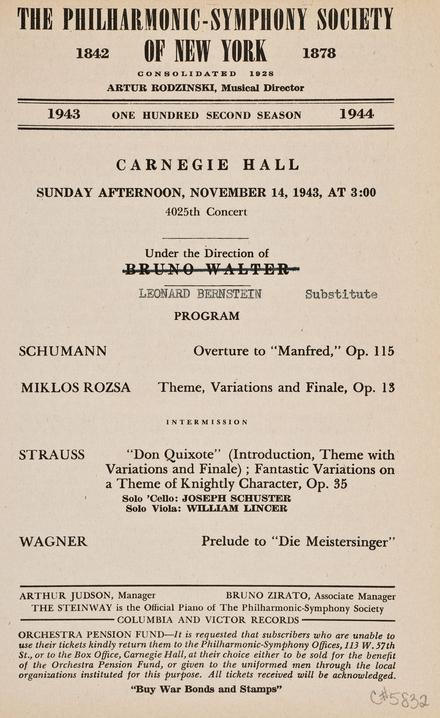
Program for L. Bernstein's concert Radio announcement

- The U.S. Navy destroyer USS William D. Porter inadvertently fired an armed torpedo at the battleship USS Iowa. "If this wasn't bad enough," author Kermit Bonner would note later, "the Iowa was carrying President Franklin D. Roosevelt, Secretary of State Cordell Hull and all of the country's World War II military brass ..." The Iowa and its escort were fifty miles east of Bermuda, and a demonstration of torpedo accuracy and range was being performed for the Commander-in-Chief. Torpedoman Lawton Dawson had failed to remove the explosive primer from torpedo tube three, a prerequisite for target practice. As soon as the torpedo was launched, it made the unique sound of an armed weapon, which was speeding directly toward the Iowa. The radioman on board the W. D. Porter was able to signal the Iowa to turn right to evade the approaching bomb in time, and the torpedo detonated beyond the battleship. The entire crew of the W. D. Porter was placed under arrest and held at Bermuda. Although Dawson would be sentenced to 14 years of hard labor, President Roosevelt intervened and asked that he not be punished for the accident. Writing in his personal logbook that evening, President Roosevelt noted that "Had that torpedo hit the Iowa in the right spot with her passenger list of distinguished statesmen, military, naval, and aerial strategists and planners, it could have had untold effect on the outcome of the war and the destiny of the country."
- The Battle of the Coconut Grove ended in Allied victory.
- The Manifesto of Verona was issued by the Fascist Republican Party, which still controlled northern Italy under the Nazi-occupied Italian Social Republic. Meeting in Verona, the party adopted an 18-point declaration of principles, including the seventh one, which reversed Italy's previous policy toward the Jews within its borders. During the early years of its alliance with Nazi Germany, the Fascist regime had avoided anything similar to the Nazi campaign against German Jews. The seventh point of the Manifesto, however, declared that "All those who belong to the Jewish race are foreigners. During this war they belong to an enemy nationality." Within two weeks, the ISR's Minister of the Interior would begin the arrest of all Jews within the nation's borders.
- Bulgaria, a member of the Axis with Germany and Italy, was bombarded for the first time by the Allies, as 91 American B-25 bombers attacked the railroad yards of Sofia and three neighboring villages, as well as the Vrajedna Airfield.
- Leonard Bernstein, age 25, was the little-known assistant director of the New York Philharmonic, charged with arranging the rehearsals for conductor Artur Rodziński and guest conductors. The orchestra's concert was going to be broadcast live on the CBS radio network, but guest conductor Bruno Walter became ill, and Rodziński was too far away from Carnegie Hall to arrive in time. Bernstein was called to fill in, and became the youngest person to ever conduct the New York Philharmonic. The next morning, the New York Times gave an excellent review for Bernstein's performance and Bernstein began a successful career as both a conductor and a composer.
- Two National Football League records were broken in the same day. Chicago Bears quarterback Sid Luckman threw seven touchdown passes in a 56–7 win over the host New York Giants while Sammy Baugh of the Washington Redskins threw for four touchdowns as a quarterback and intercepted a record four passes in a 42–20 win over the visiting Detroit Lions
- Born:
  - Peter Norton, American software engineer and businessman known for creating products such as Norton AntiVirus for Symantec; in Aberdeen, Washington
  - Rafael Callejas, President of Honduras from 1990 to 1994; in Tegucigalpa (d. 2020).

== November 15, 1943 (Monday) ==
- Heinrich Himmler, the commandant of Nazi Germany's SS police force, issued an order reclassifying the status of Gypsies in German-occupied territories. While "sedentary" people of Romani origin were "to be treated as citizens of the country", he declared "nomadic Gypsies and part-Gypsies are to be placed on the same level as Jews and placed in concentration camps." Initially, the order applied only to occupied areas in the Soviet Union.
- Royal Air Force Marshal Trafford Leigh-Mallory was named as the Commander of the Allied Expeditionary Air Forces in preparation for Operation Overlord, the planned Allied invasion of France.
- German Admiral Karl Dönitz called off all U-boat operations in the western Atlantic due to lack of success and heavy losses.
- British General Harold Alexander called off the U.S. Fifth Army assault on the Bernhardt Line in Italy, following heavy casualties from fierce German resistance as well as bad weather.

== November 16, 1943 (Tuesday) ==
- The Battle of Leros ended when Allied troops on the island surrendered. The Germans paid a heavy price, however. Having lost 160 planes and 4,800 personnel in the five days of fighting, they were even considering calling off the offensive before word of the surrender came through.
- Residents of the English village of Tyneham in Dorset were all given notice that they were being evicted. Signs posted in the village that day put everyone on notice that they had to leave by December 19. None of them had the right to contest the action, because they were all tenants of the descendants of Nathaniel Bond, whose family owned the Tyneham House and the surrounding area. The British War Department had acquired the area as a training ground in preparation for D-Day.
- Germany's nuclear weapons program was dealt a blow when 306 American bombers flew over Norway and struck a heavy water plant at Rjukan and a molybdenum refinery at Knaben.
- The USS Corvina became the only American submarine to be sunk in an attack by an enemy submarine, after the Japanese submarine I-176 struck it with two torpedoes in the South Pacific.
- The German submarine U-280 was depth charged and sunk in the North Atlantic by a B-24 of No. 86 Squadron RAF.

== November 17, 1943 (Wednesday) ==
- The Battle of Sattelberg began during the Huon Peninsula campaign in New Guinea.
- Sports editor Sam Lacy of The Chicago Defender, the African-American weekly newspaper, met with Baseball Commissioner K. M. Landis to discuss the issue of integrating the leagues of organized baseball. "This is the first time such a question has been brought into the open," Landis told reporters, "and I don't know what might come of it. I do know that the step is a healthy one ..." Landis agreed to a second meeting that where major league officials and black media representatives would confer on the matter on December 3. "I can't say where I stand— one way or the other— because the owners could come to the meeting with minds made up for or against." Landis commented.
- Born: Lauren Hutton, American actress and model; as Mary Laurence Hutton in Charleston, South Carolina

== November 18, 1943 (Thursday) ==
- The British Royal Air Force launched the largest bombing campaign carried out against Berlin up to that time, with 440 planes making a nighttime raid on the German capital. The attack killed 131 people and caused light damage. The RAF lost nine aircraft and 53 aviators.
- The Ebensee concentration camp opened, receiving its first 1,000 prisoners. These inmates were put to work excavating tunnels in the Salzkammergut Mountains near Ebensee in the Ostmark, German-annexed Austria, for the purpose of establishing a missile development facility. Originally, the laborers were Aryan, with Jewish prisoners being shipped in seven months later. At the peak of its operations, the camp had 18,000 slave workers engaged in the mining operations, and 11,000 of the inmates of the Ebensee would die from starvation and disease.
- The German 1st Panzer Division pushed the Soviets back out of Zhytomyr.
- The German submarine U-718 was accidentally rammed and sunk in the Baltic Sea by U-476.

== November 19, 1943 (Friday) ==
- Inmates of Janowska concentration camp near Lwów (at this time in German-occupied Poland), staged an uprising that ultimately failed. Leon Weliczker and several other prisoners had run errands for the camp guards, and were accustomed to bringing firewood into the guard houses. On the evening of the 19th, two groups of prisoners attacked guards in two different locations, stole their machines guns, and started a breakout. The 6,000 remaining Jewish residents of Janowska camp were killed over the next four days and on November 23, Lwów (now Lviv in Ukraine) was declared Judenrein ("clean of Jews").
- Born: Aurelio Monteagudo, Cuban-born pitcher who alternated between U.S. Major League Baseball and Venezuelan League baseball for five consecutive winter and summer seasons; in Caibarién (killed in auto accident, 1990)

== November 20, 1943 (Saturday) ==
- In the Battle of Tarawa and the Battle of Makin, the United States Marines made an amphibious landing on the Japanese-controlled Tarawa Atoll and the Makin atoll to open the assault on the Gilbert Islands (now Kiribati). Because of an overestimate of high tide by the planners, the heavily armored Higgins boats were sent toward the beach and got stuck on the coral reefs, 800 yards (730 m) short of their destination. The LVT carriers, with a shallower draft, and tracks that could travel across the coral, lacked adequate armor. When the first three sets of Marines made their assault at 9:13 a.m., "Most of the LVTs were shot to pieces," and the Marines on the stranded Higgins boats had to wade ashore. In 76 hours of fighting, more than 1,000 Marines were killed and more than 2,000 wounded, "the costliest victory in Marine history up to that point". Japanese losses were even higher; out of 3,000 troops, "only a little over a hundred Japanese survived". Decades later, a commander of the United States Navy SEALs would opine that "UDT/SEAL history began during the invasion of Tarawa", citing the creation of underwater demolition teams and the sea, air and land teams after the disastrous lessons learned from the battle. The first UDT units would be formed the following month.
- The British evacuated Samos Island.
- British Fascist Leader Sir Oswald Mosley and his wife Diana Mitford were released from prison after three years of incarceration as a threat to national security. Home Secretary Herbert Morrison explained that the controversial release was on medical grounds – Mosley was ill with phlebitis – as well as his no longer being considered a threat. Mosley and his wife were to stay under house arrest, initially living with Diana's sister Pamela.
- The German submarine U-536 was depth charged and sunk northeast of the Azores by Allied warships, while another German submarine, U-768, sank in Danzig Bay after a collision with its sister ship, U-745.
- Born:
  - Mie Hama, Japanese film actress who portrayed Kissy Suzuki in You Only Live Twice; in Tokyo
  - Marek Tomaszewski, Polish pianist with the group Marek and Wacek, in Krakau, Nazi Germany (now Kraków, Poland)

== November 21, 1943 (Sunday) ==
- British warships depth charged and sank the German submarine U-538 southwest of Ireland.
- On his Sunday radio show on the Blue Network, commentator Drew Pearson broke the story that General Dwight D. Eisenhower had reprimanded Lt. Gen. George S. Patton for hitting a soldier under his command. "A great mystery has surrounded the whereabouts of General 'Blood and Guts' Patton," Pearson told his listeners. "His pearl-handled revolver, his picturesque language, made headlines in the Tunisian campaign but he has not been heard of since. Here is the reason ..." Pearson went on to describe an incident where General Patton ordered a shell shocked Army private to get up out of bed "and when he didn't get up right away, pulled him up and struck him, knocking him down." Though not initially identified, the soldier would soon be revealed to be Army Private Charles H. Kuhl, whom Patton had hit on August 3. Despite an initial uproar and calls for Patton's firing, "the story was by then 'old news' and had little effect on Patton's career".
- Born: Larry Mahan, American rodeo cowboy, World All-Around Rodeo Champion from 1966 to 1970; in Salem, Oregon (d. 2023)
- Died: J. William Ditter, 55, U.S. Representative for Pennsylvania since 1933, was killed in a plane crash along with Lieutenant Commander J.J. Manshure while attempting to land at the Willow Grove Naval Air Station near Columbia, Pennsylvania.

== November 22, 1943 (Monday) ==
- At the Cairo Conference, codenamed "Sextant", U.S. President Franklin D. Roosevelt, British Prime Minister Winston Churchill and Nationalist Chinese President Chiang Kai-shek met at Cairo in Egypt to discuss ways to defeat Japan in the Pacific War.
- Lebanon became independent when French High Commissioner Helleu, under pressure from the United Kingdom, ordered the release of the president, prime minister and cabinet members who had been jailed ten days earlier at Rashaya. This brought an end to the French Mandate, and the date is now celebrated as Lebanon's Independence Day.
- The Dodecanese Campaign ended in Allied failure to capture the Dodecanese islands.
- Born:
  - Billie Jean King, American professional tennis champion, six time Wimbledon singles champion and four time U.S. Open champion, and founder of World Team Tennis; as Billie Jean Moffitt in Long Beach, California
  - Yvan Cournoyer, Canadian ice hockey player for Montreal Canadiens and member of Hockey Hall of Fame, in Drummondville, Quebec
  - Peter Adair, American documentary filmmaker and pioneer in the gay rights movement, best known for Word Is Out: Stories of Some of Our Lives); in Los Angeles (died of complications from AIDS, 1996)
  - William Kotzwinkle, American novelist, children's book writer, and screenplay author; in Scranton, Pennsylvania
- Died:
  - Lorenz Hart, 48, American lyricist on the songwriting team of Rodgers and Hart, best known for "The Lady Is a Tramp". Five days earlier, Hart and musician Richard Rodgers had appeared at the Martin Beck Theatre for a Broadway revival of their 1927 musical, A Connecticut Yankee, which included Hart's last song, "To Keep My Love Alive". Hart was missing for two days before he was found unconscious in his hotel room, and died of pneumonia.
  - Keiji Shibazaki, 49, Japanese rear admiral who had guided the defense of Tarawa against the U.S. Marine assault. Shibazaki, who had boasted to his troops that "a million Americans couldn't take Tarawa in 100 years", was killed on the third day of the battle when one of the Marines saw him, his chief of staff, his gunnery officers and his operations officer entering a command post on the south side of the island, then radioed an American destroyer to shell the location. Before being killed, Shibazaki was able to send one final message to General Headquarters in Tokyo: "Our weapons have been destroyed and from now on everyone is attempting a final charge. May Japan exist for 10,000 years!"

== November 23, 1943 (Tuesday) ==
- The Battle of Tarawa ended at 1:00 p.m., a little less than 77 hours after it began, when U.S. General Julian C. Smith declared that all organized resistance by the Japanese had ceased.
- The Battle of Makin also ended in American victory.
- Germany's national opera house, the Deutsche Opernhaus on Bismarckstraße in the Berlin district of Charlottenburg, was destroyed in an air raid. It would be rebuilt and reopened in 1961 as the Deutsche Oper Berlin. During the night, the Berlin Zoo and most of its 4,000 animals were destroyed. Other casualties during the week of British bombings were the German National Theatre, the National Gallery, the Invalidenstrasse Museum, the Hotel Bristol, the Charite Hospital, the City Hospital, the Schulstrasse Maternity Hospital, the Lichterfelde-East Rail Station, and the embassies of France, Sweden, Turkey, Iran and Slovakia.
- Hitler attended a demonstration of the Messerschmitt Me 262 jet aircraft.
- Born: Denis Sassou Nguesso, President of the Republic of the Congo 1979 to 1992, and from 1997 to the present; in Edou

== November 24, 1943 (Wednesday) ==
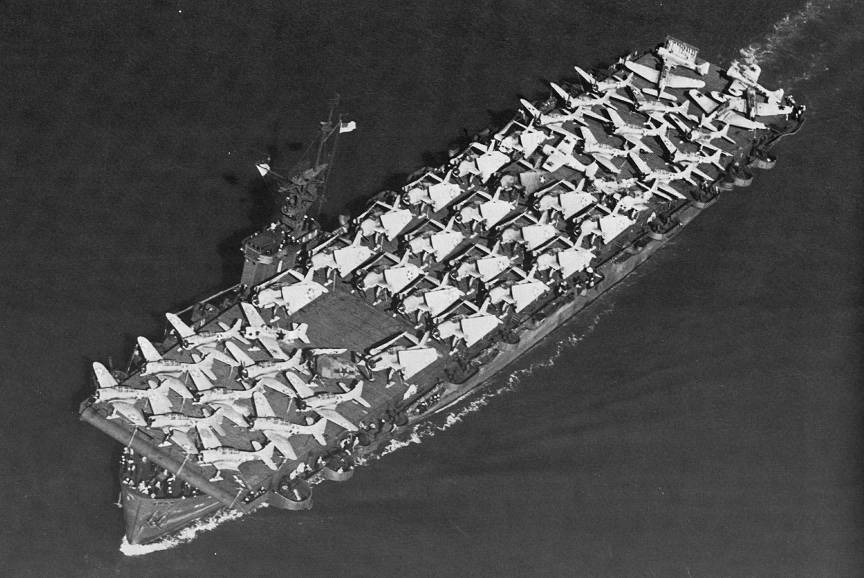
USS Liscome Bay two months before its sinking

- The escort carrier USS Liscome Bay, with 916 crewmen on board, was torpedoed and sunk by the Japanese submarine I-175. The torpedo had made a direct hit on the aircraft bomb stowage compartment on the ship's starboard side, causing a massive explosion that incinerated most of the men below decks, and the ship sank within 23 minutes. In all, 644 men were killed — 53 officers and 591 enlisted men.
- Born: Dave Bing, NBA player (1976 MVP) and inductee into the Naismith Memorial Basketball Hall of Fame, who later served as Mayor of Detroit from 2009 to 2013; in Washington, D.C.
- Died: (among the 644 people killed in the destruction of the USS Liscome Bay):
  - Dorie Miller, 24, U.S. Navy cook who became the first African-American to be awarded the Navy Cross, for his heroism during the Japanese attack on Pearl Harbor
  - Rear Admiral Henry M. Mullinnix, 51
  - Captain Irving Wiltsie, 45

== November 25, 1943 (Thursday) ==
- American and Japanese ships fought the Battle of Cape St. George between Buka Island and New Ireland, in the 15th and final naval confrontation of the campaign in the Solomon Islands. Five Japanese destroyers had been sent to deliver troops to Buka and to remove naval air technicians, and were intercepted by five American ships from the U.S. Navy's 45th Destroyer Division. Three of the five Japanese ships—the Ōnami, the Makinami, and the Yūgiri—were destroyed, and 630 of their sailors were killed, and the nighttime resupply missions, nicknamed the "Tokyo Express", came to an end.
- The Battle of Sattelberg ended in Allied victory.
- Following three nights of raids, RAF Bomber Command Chief Sir Arthur Harris declared that Berlin would be bombed "until the heart of Nazi Germany ceases to beat."
- The Japanese submarine I-19 was depth charged and sunk west of Makin Island by the American destroyer Radford.
- The German submarines U-600 and U-849 were both lost to enemy action in the Atlantic Ocean.

== November 26, 1943 (Friday) ==
- HMT Rohna, a British ocean liner that had been converted into a carrier for Allied troops, was sunk 30 minutes after a German airplane struck it with an Hs-293 guided missile. The radio-controlled bomb penetrated the ship's side and exploded below decks, in a compartment where the U.S. 853rd Aviation Engineer Battalion was stationed. The blast killed 481 officers and men, and another 534 drowned as the ship sank off of the coast of North Africa, for a total of 1,015 deaths. For security reasons, the disaster was not disclosed to news media, and few details were released even after World War II had ended.
- A 7.2 magnitude earthquake struck Turkey, along its northern coast with the Black Sea. The official toll was 2,824 people killed, and 25,000 buildings collapsed.
- Soviet troops liberated Gomel.
- The musical film Girl Crazy starring Mickey Rooney and Judy Garland with music by George Gershwin was released.
- Born: Marilynne Robinson, American writer and winner of the 2005 Pulitzer Prize for Fiction for her novel Gilead; as Marilynne Summers in Sandpoint, Idaho
- Died: Lieutenant Commander Edward "Butch" O'Hare, 29, American fighter pilot who became the U.S. Navy's first flying ace and received the Medal of Honor; missing and presumed dead after his TBF Avenger torpedo bomber was shot down over the Pacific.

== November 27, 1943 (Saturday) ==
- At the Cairo Conference, President Roosevelt, Prime Minister Churchill and President Chiang agreed to the release of the Cairo Declaration, declaring in part that "all the territories Japan has stolen from the Chinese, such as Manchuria, Formosa, and The Pescadores, shall be restored to the Republic of China" and that U.S., the U.K. and China "covet no gain for themselves and have no thought of territorial expansion", setting instead the goal that "Japan will also be expelled from all other territories which she has taken by violence and greed" and "that in due course Korea shall become free and independent".
- The Battle of Wareo began between Australian and Japanese troops in New Guinea.
- The 1943 Tosya–Ladik earthquake in Turkey killed thousands.
- The Army–Navy Game was played at West Point, New York, with Navy defeating Army 13–0. Only 15,000 spectators were on hand because of the wartime travel restriction that only allowed residents within 10 miles of the game site to attend.
- While in boot camp at Parris Island, University of Notre Dame quarterback Angelo Bertelli was handed a telegram informing him that he had just won the Heisman Trophy.
- The Hamilton Flying Wildcats beat the Winnipeg RCAF Bombers 23-14 to win the 31st Grey Cup of Canadian football.

== November 28, 1943 (Sunday) ==
- At the Tehran Conference, President Roosevelt and Prime Minister Churchill met with Soviet leader Joseph Stalin in Iran to discuss war strategy. On November 30 they established an agreement concerning Operation Overlord, the planned Anglo-American invasion of Western Europe that was originally scheduled for May, 1944. The other major change agreed upon concerned Poland. The 77,612 square of eastern Poland that had been annexed by the U.S.S.R. would remain parts of the Ukrainian, Byelorussian and Lithuanian Soviet socialist republics and Poland would be compensated by receiving the eastern portion of Germany, based on Churchill's proposal to Stalin that "Poland should move westward, 'like soldiers taking two steps left close'."
- The USSR's Council of People's Commissars (Soviet narodnykh kommissarov or Sovnarkom) issued its Resolution 1325, creating a Department for Russian Orthodox Christian Affairs and a difficult bureaucratic process for approval of the opening of new churches, a reversal of earlier stated goals to eliminate religion within the Soviet Union.
- The Koiari Raid at Bougainville began. A force of U.S. Marines was landed to harass Japanese troops on the island.
- The German submarine U-542 was depth charged and sunk north of Madeira by a Vickers Wellington of No. 179 Squadron RAF.
- Born: Randy Newman, American singer/songwriter; in Los Angeles

== November 29, 1943 (Monday) ==
- At the second session of the Anti-Fascist Council of National Liberation of Yugoslavia (Antifašističko Vijeće Narodnog Oslobođenja Jugoslavije or AVNOJ), held at Jajce, Bosnia and Herzegovina, the council created a shadow government to operate after the end of the war. The delegates declared that the monarchy would not be restored and that the post-war Yugoslavia would be a federated state of six republics, under the overall rule of Josip Broz Tito.
- The Koiari Raid ended in offensive failure for the Americans when they withdrew after being attacked by a larger-than-expected Japanese force.
- The U.S. Navy destroyer USS Perkins sank after a collision with the Australian troopship Duntroon off Ipoteto Island, New Guinea, with the loss of nine crew.
- The Japanese submarine I-21 was probably sunk on this date by American TBF Avengers off Tarawa.
- The German submarine U-86 was sunk east of the Azores by British destroyers Tumult and Rocket.

== November 30, 1943 (Tuesday) ==
- President Roosevelt's Executive Order 9397 took effect upon publication in the Federal Register. By providing that "any Federal department, establishment, or agency shall, whenever the head thereof finds it advisable to establish a new system of permanent account numbers pertaining to individual persons, utilize exclusively the Social Security Act account numbers", EO 9397 would ultimately mean that every American would need a Social Security number to qualify for any federal program.
- The Soviets withdrew from Korosten after holding it for twelve days.
- Guido Buffarini Guidi, the Minister of the Interior for the Nazi-controlled Italian Social Republic, issued the order to arrest all Jews within ISR boundaries and to deport them to concentration camps.
- Notre Dame won the mythical national college football title, despite a 19–14 loss three days earlier to the Great Lakes Naval Training Center, as the Associated Press announced the results of its ninth and final poll of 131 sportswriters. The Fighting Irish received 86 first place votes and 1,259 points overall, while the Iowa Pre-Flight Seahawks had 1,028 points but only 12 votes overall. Other first place votes went to Purdue University (12), Del Monte Pre-Flight (9), Duke University (7), and Great Lakes NTC and the University of Michigan with one apiece.
- Died:
  - Etty Hillesum, 29, Dutch Jewish scholar, was executed at the Auschwitz concentration camp. The diaries that she had written would be published 37 years later under the title Het verstoorde leven (An Interrupted Life).
