= Rose Memorial Auditorium =

- Rose Memorial or Rose Francis Rose and Hopevale Martyrs Memorial
- The Rose Memorial Auditorium
- Interactive map of the Rose Memorial Auditorium area

General information
- Type: Concert Hall
- Location: University Avenue cor. Church Road (No. 50 López-Jaena St.), Jaro, Iloilo City, Philippines
- Coordinates: 10°43′49″N 122°32′56″E
- Completed: 1950
- Inaugurated: 1994/1995 (rebuilt)

Height
- Height: 55 feet (17 m)^{2}

Technical details
- Floor count: 3 (including rooftop)

Other information
- Seating capacity: ~4,500 (full)

The Rose Memorial Auditorium (Rose Memorial or Rose) is a large multi-purpose theater (auditorium) on the campus of Central Philippine University in Jaro, Iloilo City. Rose is the largest auditorium and theater in Western Visayas with a seating capacity of 4000 and has hosted several international and local concerts, conventions and events from known music groups and singers, as well as conventions and summits of known public servants and organizations.

It was built as a memorial in honor of Francis H. Rose, one of American founding fathers of Central Philippine University along with the Hopevale Martyrs who died during the World War II.

The present day structure was built in the 1990s after the old one was burned down by fire. Recently, the Cultural Center of the Philippines has designated the Rose Memorial Auditorium for three-year Memorandum of Understanding, as one of the first batch of nine Cultural Center of the Philippines Regional Art Centers or Kaisa sa Sining Regional Art Centers in 2014.

With the exception of Rose's concerts, it also serves as the venue for religious convocations of Central Philippine University and the biennial convention of the Convention of Philippine Baptist Churches.

== Notable concerts, summits and conventions ==
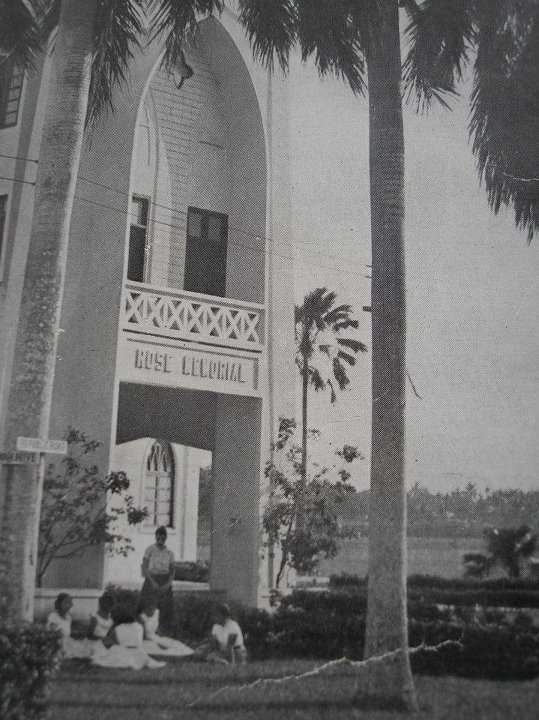
The old Rose Memorial Hall before it was burned down by fire in the 90s.

Since the 1990s, when the new Rose Memorial was opened to the public for university use at Central Philippine University, it has become a prominent venue in Iloilo for performances by notable international and local bands (rock, pop, acoustic, and group), recording artists/singers, as well as other music groups. Additionally, it serves as a host for symposiums, summits, and conventions for public servants and organizations.

Bands

- M.Y.M.P.
- Hale (band)

Singers/Celebrities

- Sharon Cuneta
- Sarah Geronimo
- Zsa Zsa Padilla
- Christian Bautista
- John Ford Coley

Politicians, public servants and known personas in various sectors

- Gina Lopez - environmentalist and former environment secretary under President Rodrigo Duterte.
- Arthur Defensor Sr. - former governor of Iloilo and congressman.
- Oscar M. Lopez - chairman, Lopez Group of Companies.

Singing groups and others

- The Carpenters
- Don Moen
- Platters
- The Cascades
- Philippine Madrigal Singers
