= André Albert =

French politician (1911–1976)

André Albert (19 February 1911 - 15 June 1976) was a French politician.

Albert was born in Paris. He represented the Radical-Socialist Party Camille Pelletan in the Chamber of Deputies from 1936 to 1940. On 10 July 1940 he voted in favour of granting the Cabinet presided by Marshal Philippe Pétain authority to draw up a new constitution, thereby effectively ending the French Third Republic and establishing Vichy France. In June 1943 he fled from occupied France and joined the Free French Forces.
