= Battle of Kočevje =

World War II battle in Kočevje, Slovenia

- Part of World War II in Yugoslavia
Date	9–12 December 1943
Location	Kočevje
Territorial changes	Operational Zone of the Adriatic Littoral

Belligerents
Slovene Partisans	Germany; Slovene Home Guard

Strength
Tone Tomšič Brigade, Ljubo Šercer Brigade, Loška Brigade	150 German police and some 100 Slovene Home Guard members

The Battle of Kočevje (Slovene: bitka za Kočevje) was an encounter between the Slovene Partisans, the armed wing of the pro-Allies Liberation Front of the Slovene People and on the other hand the German occupying forces and the pro-Axis Slovene Home Guard in Operational Zone of the Adriatic Littoral during World War II.

Under the command of Mirko Bračič at midnight on 9 December 1943 the town of Kočevje (German: Gotschee) was attacked by three Slovene Partisans brigades. The attack was supported by the partisan artillery and mortars.

The Kočevje mine, student hostel, school and some other important buildings in the city were captured by the partisans. The remnants of the German-Home Guard garrison retreated into the Gotschee Castle where it remained protected by its thick walls until two German relief columns under the command of Oskar von Niedermayer came from Ljubljana and broke the partisan encirclement, rescuing the besieged German garrison on 12 December 1943.
