= Hopevale Martyrs =

The Hopevale Martyrs were Christian martyrs who died during World War II in the present day Hopevale, Aglinab, Tapaz, Capiz, Philippines. The martyrs were Jennie Clare Adams, Prof. James Howard Covell, Charma Moore Covell, Dorothy Antoinette Dowell, Signe Amelia Erickson, Dr. Frederick Willer Meyer, Ruth Violet (Schatch) Meyer, Dr. Francis Howard Rose, Gertrude Coombs Rose, Rev. Erle Frederick Rounds, and Louise Cummings Rounds. Three children, one named Erle Douglas Rounds--the young son of Erle Frederick and Louise, were also bayoneted. Despite the order that these Americans should go home because of the war, they refused to leave their mission and eventually offered their lives when they were caught by the enemies.

During the Japanese invasion of the Philippines, the eleven American Baptist missionaries refused to surrender to the Japanese troops. The martyrs took refuge in the mountains of Barrio Katipunan, Tapaz, Capiz. They hid in the forest they call "Hopevale" with the help of their Filipino friends.

On December 19, 1943, Hopevale fell into Japanese hands. The martyrs begged to free the Filipino captives and instead offered themselves as ransom. At the dawn of December 20, 1943, the missionaries asked to be allowed to pray and, an hour later, they told their Japanese captors they were ready to die. The adults were beheaded and the children were bayoneted.

== Memorial ==
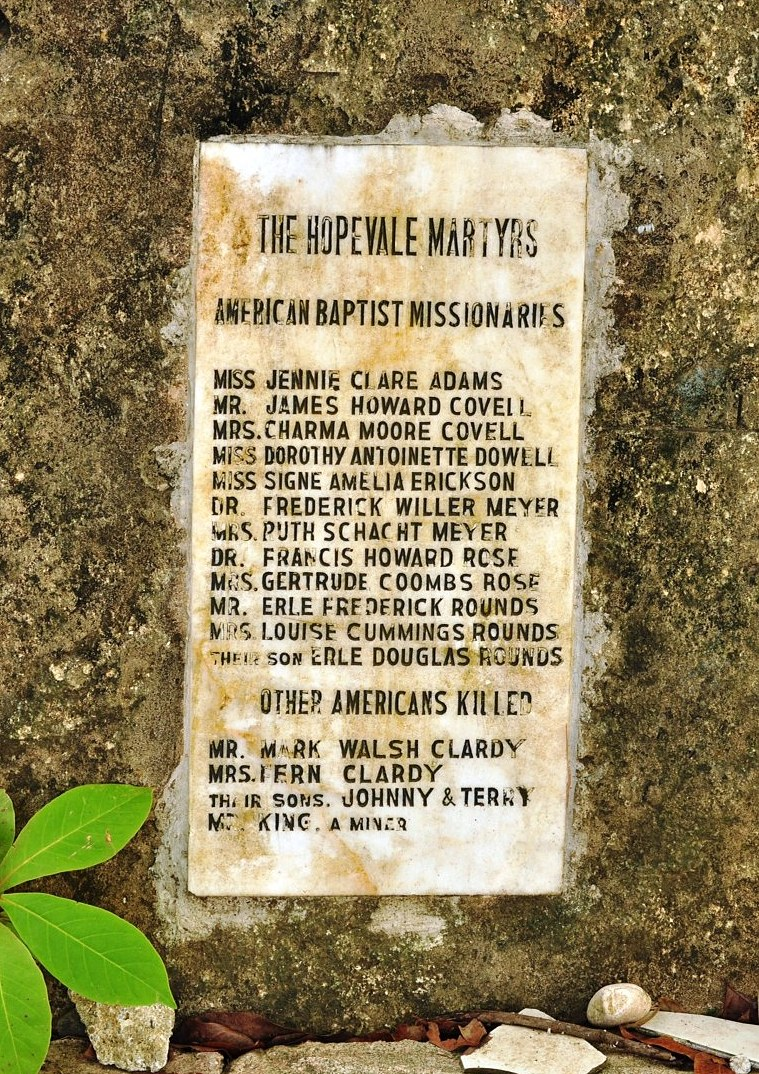
Plaque to the Hopevale Martyrs located at Central Philippine University, Iloilo, the Philippines

There is a cross marker on top of the common grave of these martyrs in Hopevale near the place where they were executed. A replica of this marker also stands at Central Philippine University. There is also a plaque on the campus of CPU as well.

== Legacy ==
No Greater Love; Triumph and Sacrifice of American Baptist Missionaries During WW II Philippines, and the Martyrdom in Hopevale by Elmo D. Familiaran, Ann Qualls and Wilma Rugh Taylor was published in 2007.

The complete Hopevale story is chronicled in The Edge of Terror, by Baptist minister Scott Walker.

A two-act musical drama titled Hopevale: Memories of Missions and Martyrs was staged in honor of the Hopevale martyrs during the centennial celebration of the founding of Central Philippine University (CPU) in 2005. The musical was written by Rodolfo “Boy” Cabado, an alumnus of the university, and originally choreographed by Edwin C. Duero.

A restaging, titled Hopevale: The Musicale, was held on December 2–3, 2024, at the Rose Memorial Auditorium of CPU. The production was adapted from Cabado’s original work and recreated by Margaret Rose Dominado and Dr. Jose Denzil Daquiado, with Rev. Dr. Elmo Dianala Familiaran as consultant. Musical direction was led by Dr. Gerardo Vicente A. Muyuela and Benny Fruto Castillon.

Presented by CPU, the production involved students, faculty, and alumni under CPU President Rev. Dr. Ernest Howard B. Dagohoy as Executive Producer and Crista Sianson-Huyong as Line Producer. The team included Faith Jordan Javellana for Artistic Direction and Choreography, Joshua Jonathan Quimpo for Musical Direction, Romel Salvador N. Chiu as Technical Director and Sound Engineer, Pete Marwin & Company for Multimedia, Shey Suyo-Velasquez for Marketing and Promotions, and Siref Alfaras for Graphic Design.

The restaging retold the story of the American Baptist missionaries executed by Japanese soldiers on December 20, 1943, in Katipunan, Tapaz, Capiz—a place they called Hopevale. The production was well received and regarded as a tribute to the martyrs’ faith and sacrifice, symbolizing the enduring spirit of hope within the CPU community.

Jennie Clare Adams wrote a collection of poems about her experience, which later be published as The Hills Did Not Imprison Her by Woman's American Baptist Foreign Mission Society

Hopevale Church in Saginaw, Michigan takes its name from the Hopevale Martyrs.

Parchment Valley, the West Virginia Baptist Conference Center in Ripley, West Virginia hosts a replica of the Hopevale Chapel. It is built at the end of a trail with wind chimes honoring each of the Hopevale Martyrs.

Another replica of the Hopevale Chapel can be found on the grounds of Green Lake Conference Center in Green Lake, Wisconsin.
