= Lawrence Tyson =

American officer and politician (1861-1929)

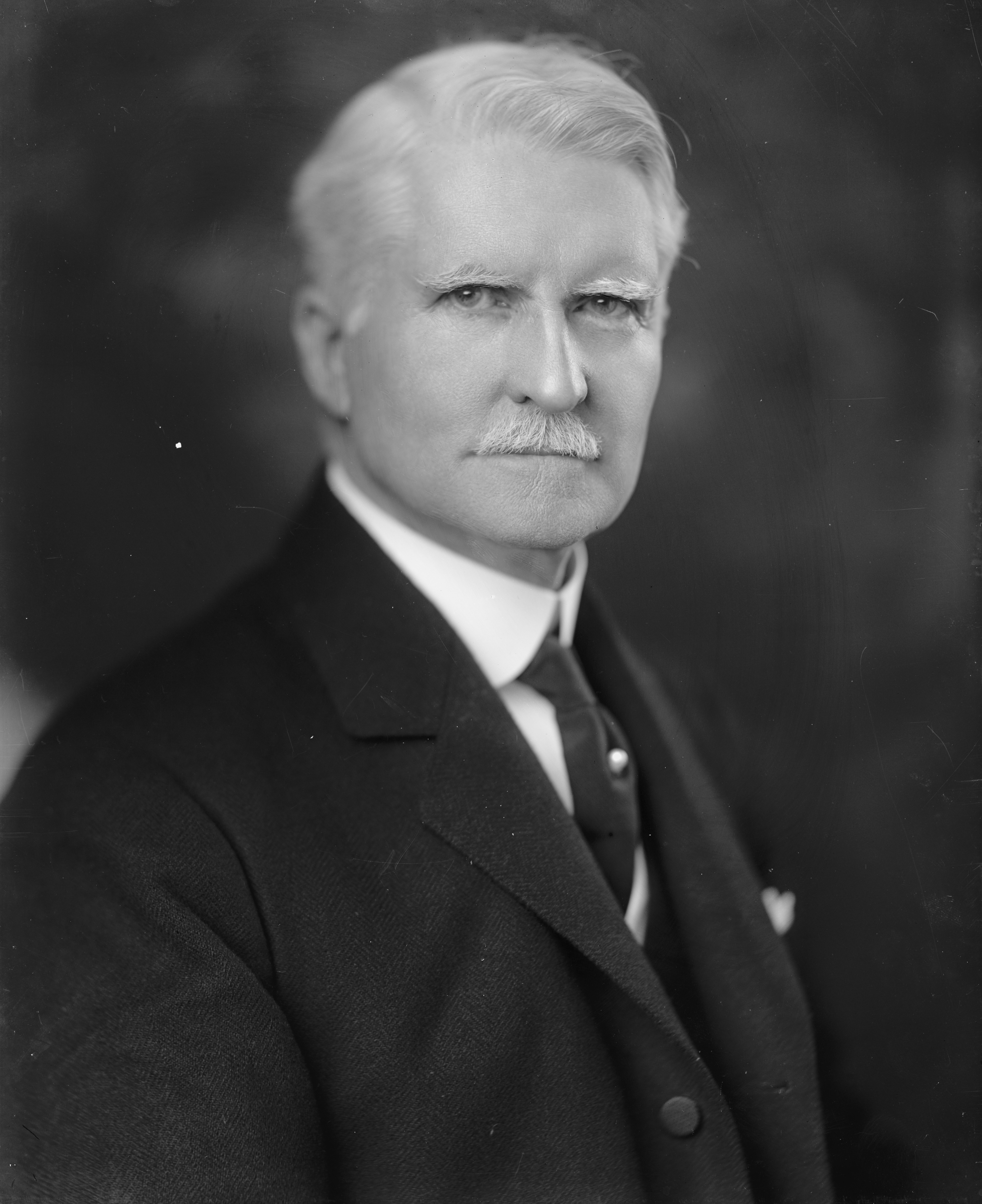
- Official portrait, c. 1905
- In office March 4, 1925 – August 24, 1929
- Preceded by: John K. Shields
- Succeeded by: William E. Brock

Speaker of the Tennessee House of Representatives
- In office 1903–1905
- Preceded by: Edgar B. Wilson
- Succeeded by: William K. Abernathy

Personal details
- Born: Lawrence Davis Tyson; July 4, 1861 Pitt County, North Carolina, U.S.
- Died: August 24, 1929 (aged 68) Strafford, Pennsylvania, U.S.
- Party: Democratic
- Spouse: Bettie Humes McGhee
- Children: Charles McGhee Tyson; Isabella Tyson (Gilpin)
- Education: U.S. Military Academy; West Point, New York, US
- Occupation: Soldier, politician, lawyer, businessman
- Awards: Distinguished Service Cross
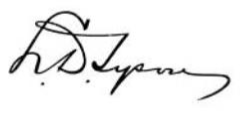
- Signature

Military service
- Branch/service: U.S. Army; Tennessee National Guard
- Years of service: 1883–1896, 1898–1899, 1900–1906, 1917–1919
- Rank: Brigadier general
- Commands: 6th Regiment U.S. Volunteer Infantry (1898–1899), 59th Brigade, 30th Infantry Division (1917–1919)
- Battles/wars: Apache Wars, Spanish–American War, World War I

Lawrence Davis Tyson (July 4, 1861 – August 24, 1929) was an American brigadier general, politician, lawyer and textile manufacturer, who operated primarily out of Knoxville, Tennessee during the late 19th and early 20th centuries. During World War I, Tyson commanded the 59th Brigade of the 30th Infantry Division, then served as a Democratic United States senator from Tennessee from 1925 until his death.

A graduate of West Point, Tyson first saw military action during the Apache Wars in the 1880s. He moved to Knoxville in 1891 to teach military science at the University of Tennessee, became a lawyer and also led the 6th Regiment, Tennessee Volunteer Infantry during the Spanish–American War. Tyson helped organize the Knoxville Cotton Mills in the early 20th century and served as president of the second Appalachian Exposition in 1911. From 1902 to 1908, Tyson served in the Tennessee House of Representatives, and was Speaker of the Tennessee House from 1903 to 1905. During the Hundred Days Offensive of World War I, the 59th Brigade, under Tyson's leadership, became one of the first Allied brigades to break through the Hindenburg Line.

== Early life and education ==
Tyson was born on the farm of his parents, Richard Lawrence Tyson and Margaret Turnage, near Greenville in Pitt County, North Carolina near the Tar River in the Tidewater region. After graduating from the private Greenville Academy, Tyson initially worked as a clerk in Salisbury.

In 1878, he scored the highest in his region on a competitive entrance exam for the United States Military Academy (USMA) at West Point, New York, and was admitted the following year. Upon graduation in 1883, Tyson was commissioned as a second lieutenant. Several of his classmates would go on to become general officers in their careers, such as Charles W. Kennedy, George H. Cameron, Harry C. Hale, George W. Read, John W. Heard, Ira A. Haynes, Samson L. Faison, William C. Langfitt, Robert D. Walsh, Omar Bundy, Charles G. Morton, Tyree R. Rivers, John W. Ruckman, Isaac Littell and Clarence R. Edwards. Tyson later took part in the Apache Wars against a Geronimo-led faction of Apaches in the West.

=== Personal life ===
In 1886, Tyson married Bettie Humes McGhee, the daughter of wealthy Knoxville railroad baron Charles McClung McGhee (1828–1907). They had a son and a daughter. The son, military aviator Charles McGhee Tyson, died on October 11, 1917 (during World War I) in the north Atlantic ocean aged 29. In July 2007, Drew Gilpin Faust, a professor of history, college administrator and a great-granddaughter of Lawrence D. and Bettie Tyson, became Harvard University's 28th president. Her paternal grandmother was Isabella (Tyson) Gilpin, Lawrence and Bettie's daughter. Her parents were McGhee Tyson and Catherine (Mellick) Gilpin, born to a wealthy New Jersey family. Tyson is also a great-grandfather of actor Jack Gilpin and a great-great-grandfather of Jack's daughter, actress Betty Gilpin.

=== Professor and lawyer ===
With his father-in-law's help, Tyson was appointed professor of military science at the University of Tennessee in 1891.

Tyson also enrolled in the university's law school, from which he graduated in 1894. After his admission to the Tennessee Bar, he resigned his military commission and began practicing law. At one point, Tyson worked for the law firm of Edward Terry Sanford (1865–1930), future Supreme Court justice.

== Spanish–American War and business ventures ==
Upon the outbreak of the Spanish–American War in 1898, Tyson returned to active military duty. Appointed a colonel by President William McKinley, he organized and trained the 6th Regiment U.S. Volunteer Infantry in the Summer of 1898. In October, he and his unit were shipped to Puerto Rico, where they garrisoned the Arecibo area on the northern half of the island. As the war wound down in February 1899, Tyson's unit was ordered to Savannah, Georgia, where they were mustered out a month later. Tyson entered the National Guard reserve units.

Back in Knoxville, Tyson returned to private law practice. He organized the Knoxville Cotton Mills, which would grow to become one of Knoxville's major textile companies in the early 20th century. In 1907, he chaired a conference in Nashville, which called for reform in child labor practices across the South. In December 1910, several dozen children were still working at a Knoxville Cotton Mills factory, as shown in a photograph by National Child Labor Committee photographer Lewis Hine.

== State politics ==
Tyson's first foray into politics came in 1902, when he was elected to the Tennessee House of Representatives. In 1889, the Democrats had gained control of the state legislature and quickly passed four acts which they described as "electoral reform," including literacy tests, grandfather clauses and poll taxes. These resulted in the disfranchisement of most of the African-American voters in the state, as well as many poor white voters. This sharply reduced competitive politics in the state, leading to Democratic dominance.

From 1903 to 1905, Tyson served as the elected Speaker of the House. Simultaneously, he served as a brigadier general and inspector general of the Tennessee National Guard, a position he held from 1902 to 1908. In 1913, he made an unsuccessful run for the U.S. Senate, seeking the Democratic nomination from the state legislature. That year, the Seventeenth Amendment to the United States Constitution was ratified, providing for popular election of US senators. It generally affected elections for US senators beginning in 1914.

== World War I ==
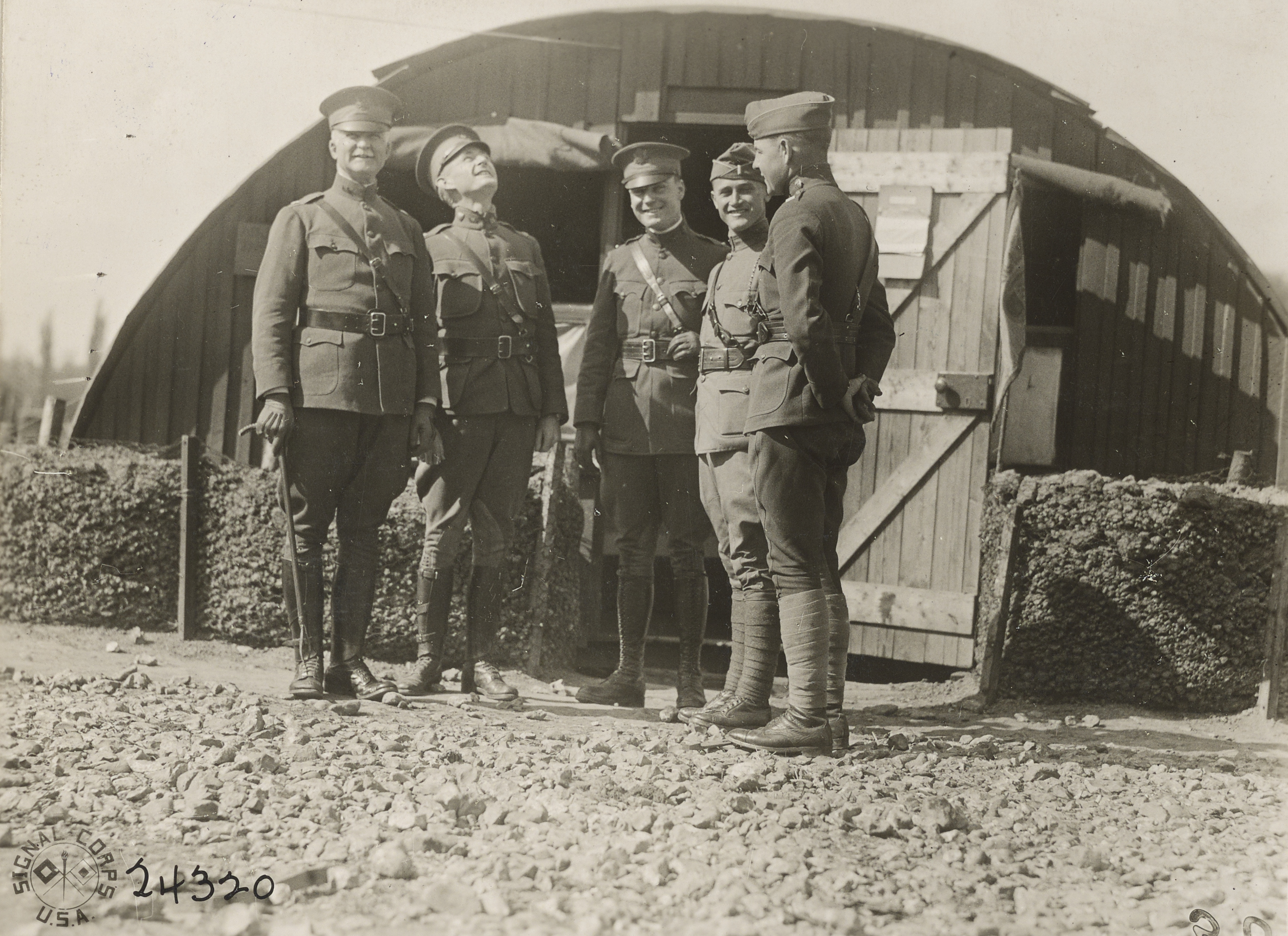
Brigadier General Lawrence D. Tyson, commanding the 59th Brigade, 30th Division, pictured here with a group of staff officers near Poperinge, six kilometers from Ypres, Belgium, September 1, 1918.

Upon the American entry into World War I, in April 1917, Tyson applied to return to active military duty, and was appointed brigadier general over all Tennessee National Guard troops by Governor Tom C. Rye. This commission was subsequently federalized by President Woodrow Wilson. Tyson was assigned to the command of the 59th Brigade in succession to Brigadier General William S. Scott, part of the 30th "Old Hickory" Division, and helped train the brigade (composed of the 117th and 118th Infantry Regiments and the 114th Machine Gun Battalion) at Camp Sevier near Greenville, South Carolina. Tyson temporarily commanded the entire division three times during his service with the 30th: from December 22−28, 1917, from March 30 to April 7, 1918, and from January 12−15, 1919. After several more months of training, Tyson's brigade, together with rest of the division, embarked for service overseas on the Western Front in May 1918, and were among the first American troops to enter Belgium in July of that year.

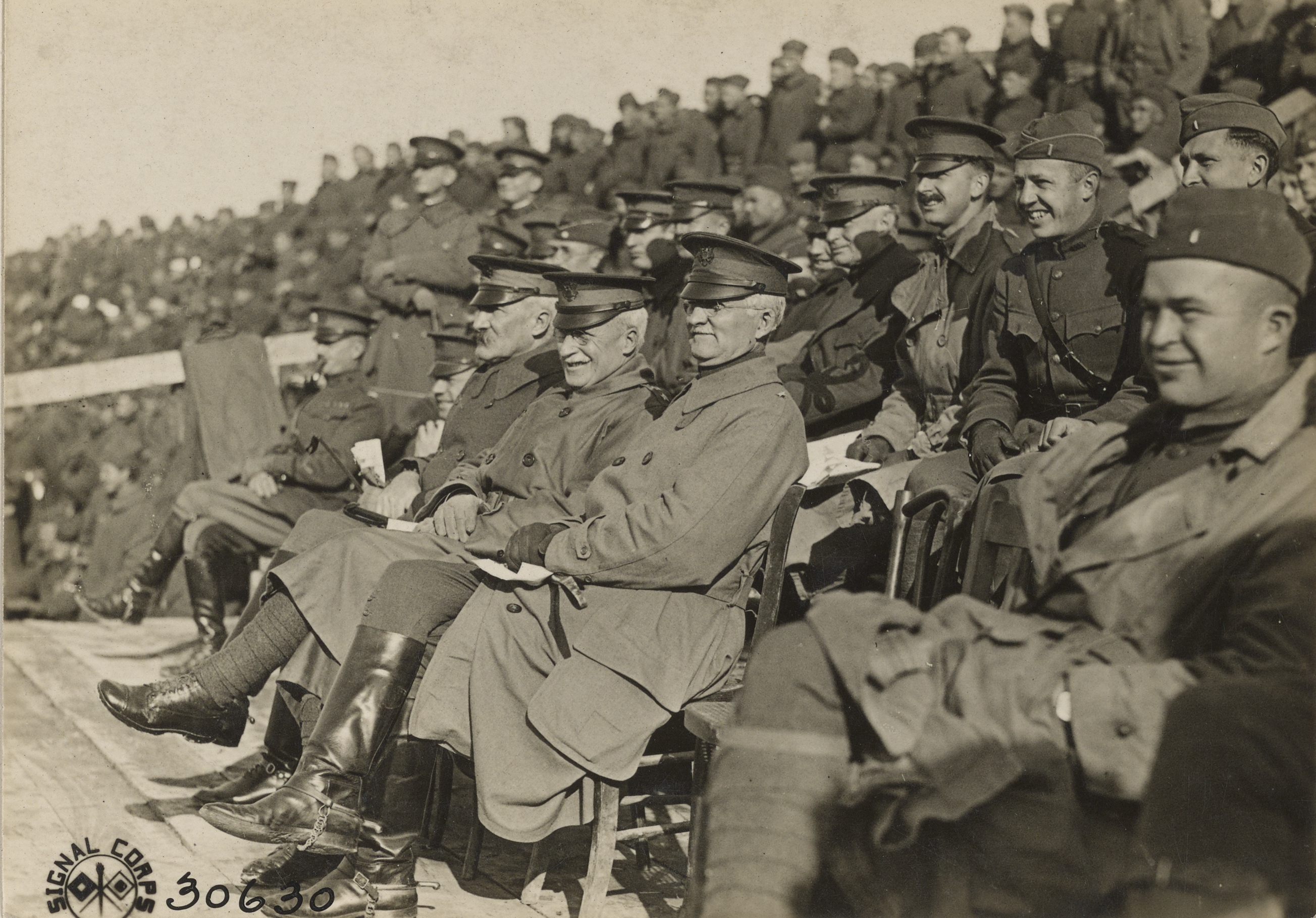
Major General George W. Read, commanding U.S. II Corps, Major General Edward M. Lewis, commanding the 30th Division, and Brigadier General Lawrence Tyson, spectators at II Corps Field Meet boxing matches. Pictured here at Corbie, Somme, France, November 4, 1918.

In September 1918, the 30th Division, now commanded by Major General Edward M. Lewis and serving with the British Expeditionary Force (BEF), was ordered to the Somme area in northern France, and positioned opposite the heavily fortified Cambrai-Saint Quentin Canal section of the Hindenburg Line. On the morning of September 29, the 30th attacked German fortifications along this section of the line. Marching in dense fog, the troops pushed across a 3-mile (4.8 km) stretch of "wire entanglements and trench defenses" before crossing the canal and securing the area. According to some reports, the 59th was the first Allied brigade to break through the Hindenburg Line.

In subsequent weeks, the 59th captured the northern French villages of Prémont, Brancourt, and Busigny, and fought its last action on October 20. In the course of the war, 1,879 of the 59th's 8,000 troops were killed or wounded. The brigade received nine Medals of Honor, the most of any single brigade of the U.S. Army during World War I, (Note: The nine recipients were: James C. Dozier, Gary Evans Foster, Thomas L. Hall, James D. Heriot, Richmond H. Hilton, James Ernest Karnes, Edward R. Talley, John C. Villepigue, Calvin John Ward) while Tyson himself was awarded the Army Distinguished Service Medal. The citation for the medal reads:

The President of the United States of America, authorized by Act of Congress, July 9, 1918, takes pleasure in presenting the Army Distinguished Service Medal to Brigadier General Lawrence Davis Tyson, United States Army, for exceptionally meritorious and distinguished services to the Government of the United States, in a duty of great responsibility during World War I. General Tyson Commanded with distinction the 59th Infantry Brigade, 30th Division, throughout its training period and during its active operations against the enemy. His determination and skill as a military leader were reflected in the successes of his brigade in the attack and capture of Brancourt and Premont, where a large number of prisoners and much material fell into our hands. He rendered services of great worth to the American Expeditionary Forces.

In October 1918, Tyson's son, Charles McGhee Tyson (1889–1918), a pilot in the United States Navy, was lost over the North Sea while scouting for mines. After Germany's surrender, Tyson left the front to help search for his son off the coast of Scotland. He located his son's body, and shipped it back to Knoxville for burial. Tyson left active duty for the final time in 1919.

== Senate career ==
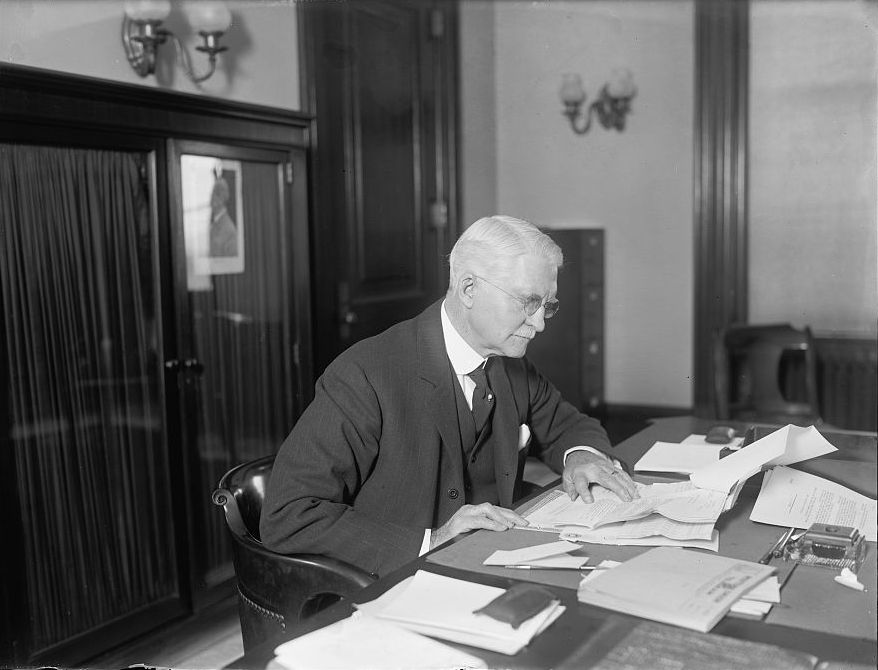
Senator Tyson, photographed in his office in December 1925

In 1920, Tyson made an unsuccessful effort to gain the vice presidential nomination at the Democratic National Convention. In 1923, he purchased a newspaper, the Knoxville Sentinel. When he won the popular election to the U.S. Senate the following year, he sold the newspaper to Scripps-Howard. In 1926, Scripps-Howard merged the Sentinel with the Knoxville News to form the Knoxville News Sentinel.

In the early 1920s, the Democratic Party had grown frustrated with Senator John Knight Shields, who had opposed President Woodrow Wilson's League of Nations, and had stalled a number of the Executive Branch's political appointments. Sensing Shields' vulnerability, Tyson ran against and defeated Shields in the Senate Democratic primary in 1924. He defeated Republican candidate, Hugh B. Lindsay, in the general election later that year. He was sworn in as a Senator on March 4, 1925.

Tyson's first major piece of legislation was the Tyson-Fitzgerald Act of 1925, which authorized federal compensation for disabled World War I officers. After President Calvin Coolidge vetoed the bill, Tyson rallied enough opposition in the Senate to override the president's veto. In 1926, Tyson sponsored legislation authorizing the creation of the Great Smoky Mountains National Park.

== Death and legacy ==
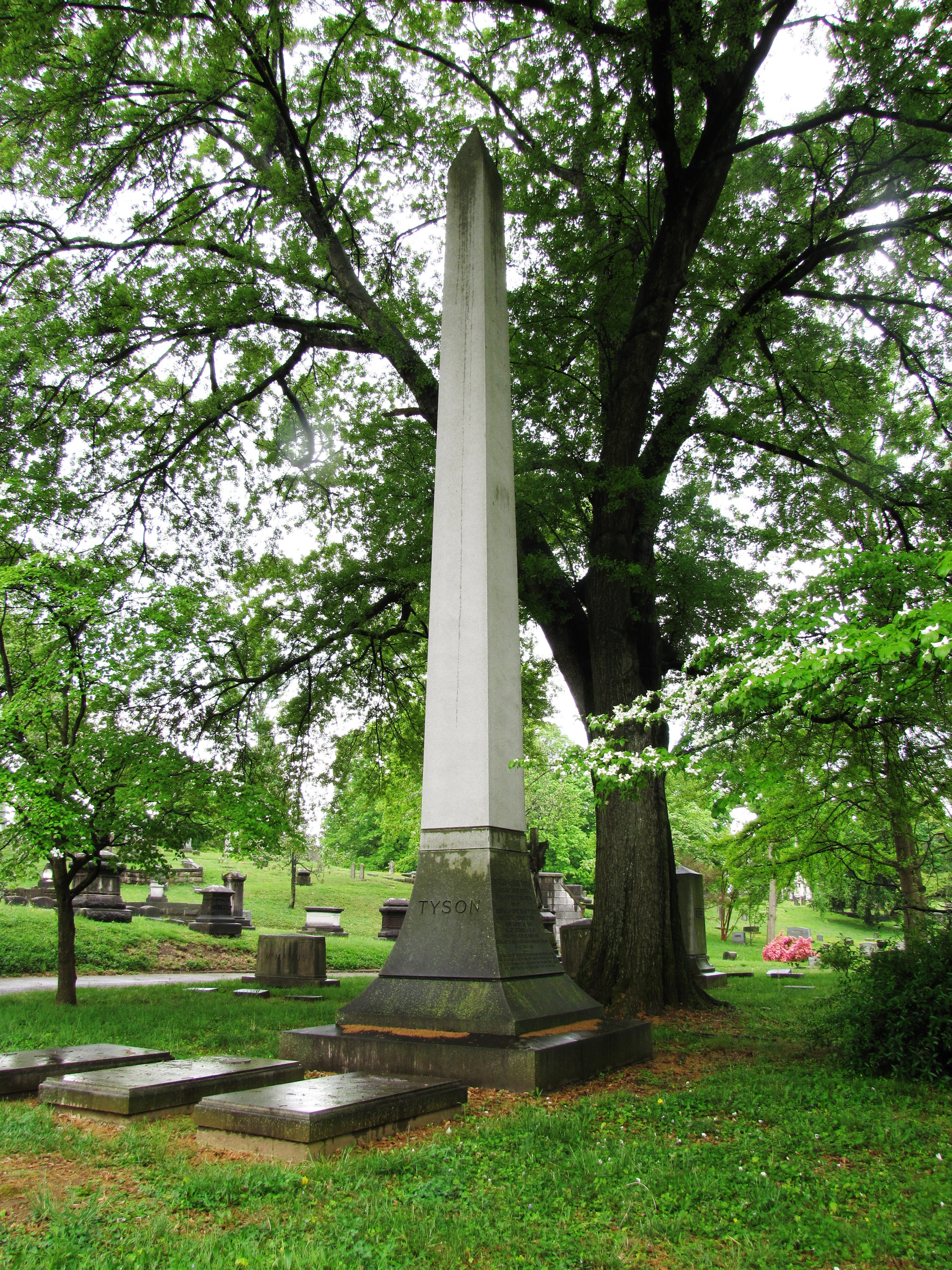
Grave of Tyson at Old Gray Cemetery

Tyson died, at the age of 68, in 1929 at a sanitarium in Strafford, Pennsylvania. He is buried in Old Gray Cemetery in Knoxville. The obelisk marking the Tyson family plot is among the tallest monuments in the cemetery. Many of his papers are now held by the University of North Carolina's library.

In 1927, Lawrence and Bettie Tyson donated the land for what is now Tyson Park, as well as land for an airstrip (originally in West Knoxville), to the City of Knoxville, asking in return that the city name the airstrip for their son, Charles McGhee Tyson. McGhee Tyson Airport has since been moved to Blount County.

- Tyson Junior High School, which operated in Knoxville from 1935 until 1986, was named in Lawrence Tyson's honor.
- Camp Tyson, the World War II U.S. Army training post near Paris, Tennessee was named for him.
- Tyson's home on Volunteer Boulevard, which was remodeled by noted architect George Franklin Barber in 1907, is now used as the University of Tennessee's Tyson Alumni House. In 2012, the house was listed on the National Register of Historic Places as the General Lawrence D. Tyson House.

== See also ==
- List of members of the United States Congress who died in office (1900–1949)

== Notes ==
Party political offices
Preceded by John K. Shields	Democratic nominee for U.S. Senator from Tennessee (Class 2); 1924	Succeeded by William Emerson Brock
U.S. Senate
Preceded by John K. Shields	U.S. senator (Class 2) from Tennessee; 1925–1929; Served alongside: Kenneth D. McKellar	Succeeded by William Emerson Brock
