= 130th Maneuver Enhancement Brigade =

- Active: 1911 - present
- Country: United States
- Branch: United States Army National Guard
- Role: Maneuver Enhancement
- Size: Brigade
- Part of: North Carolina Army National Guard
- Garrison/HQ: Charlotte Armory, Charlotte, NC
- Motto: Ever Dependable
- Website: https://ng.nc.gov/130th-maneuver-enhancement-brigade

Commanders
- Current commander: LTC Robert Felicio
- Command Sergeant Major: CSM Bobby J Silvers

Insignia
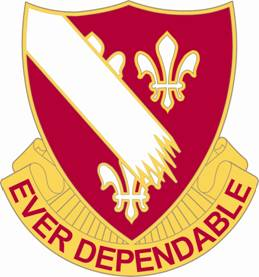
- 130th Maneuver Enhancement Brigade DUI

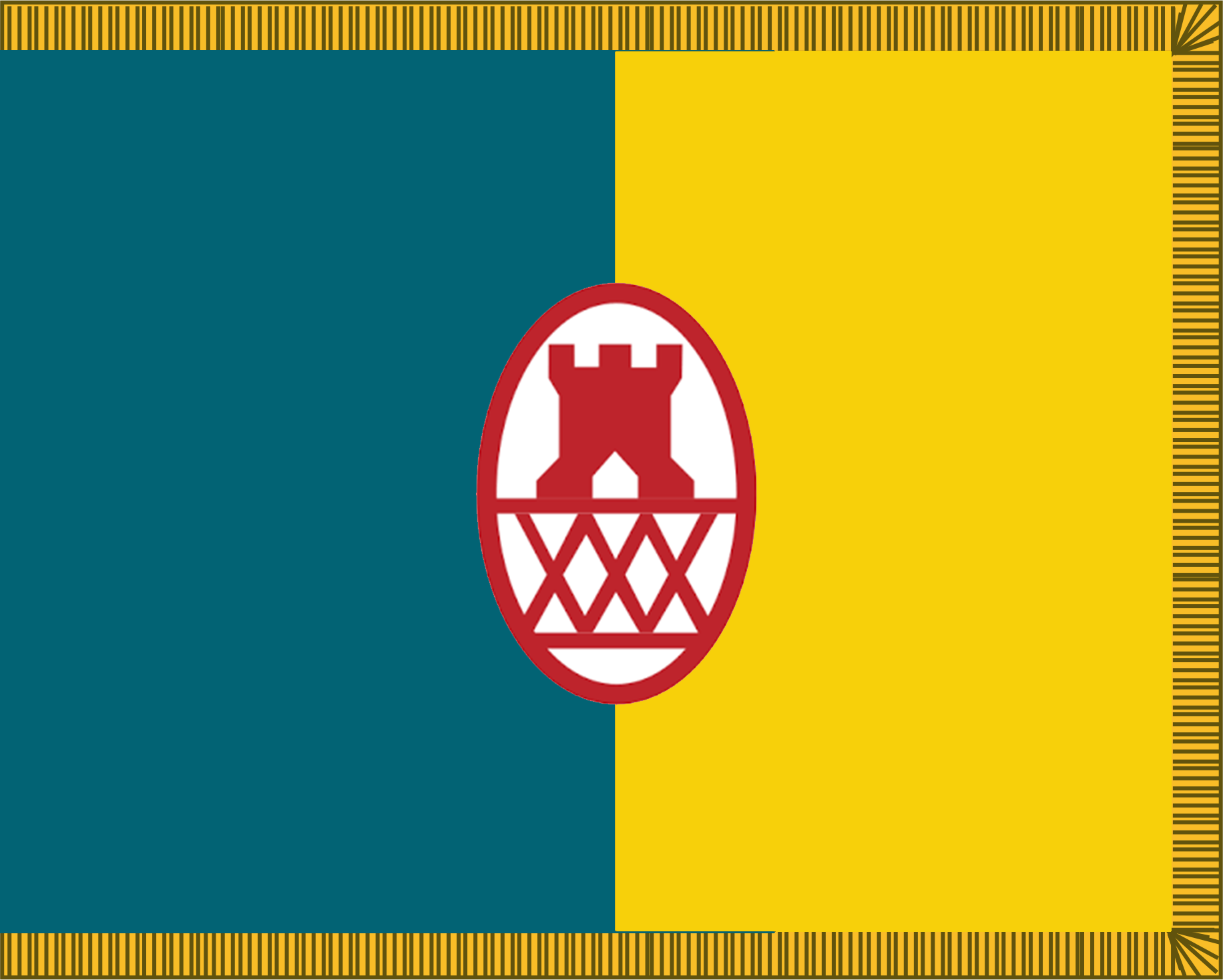
- 130th Maneuver Enhancement Brigade Flag

The 130th Maneuver Enhancement Brigade is a unit in the North Carolina Army National Guard. The unit carries a long lineage that takes it back to the before the First World War. In 2020, the brigade was deployed for the COVID-19 response. The brigade responded to Hurricane Florence in 2018 and Hurricane Helene in 2024.

== Unit History ==
- March 6, 1911 - Company D (Hornets' Nest Rifles), 1st Infantry Regiment, North Carolina National Guard, Charlotte, NC, served June 1916 - August 1917 Mexican Border service.
- September 12, 1917 - Redesignated Company F, 105th Engineers, 30th Infantry Division. Demobilized April 28, 1919 Camp Jackson, SC.
- April 26, 1923 reorganized Company C, 105th Engineers, 30th Infantry Division. Federalized September 16, 1940
- February 16, 1942 redesignated HHC Co., 105th Engineers, 30th Infantry Division.
- August 1, 1942 redesignated Headquarters and Service Co., 105th Combat Engineer Battalion, 30th Infantry Division. Demobilized November 16, 1945 Camp Jackson, SC
- September 16, 1947 redesignated Headquarters and Service Co., 378th Combat Engineer Battalion, Federalized August 14, 1950
- October 28, 1954 redesignated Headquarters and Service Co., 105th Engineer Battalion, 30th Infantry Division. Demobilized February 22, 1955
- November 30, 1956 redesignated Headquarters Co., 105th Engineer Battalion
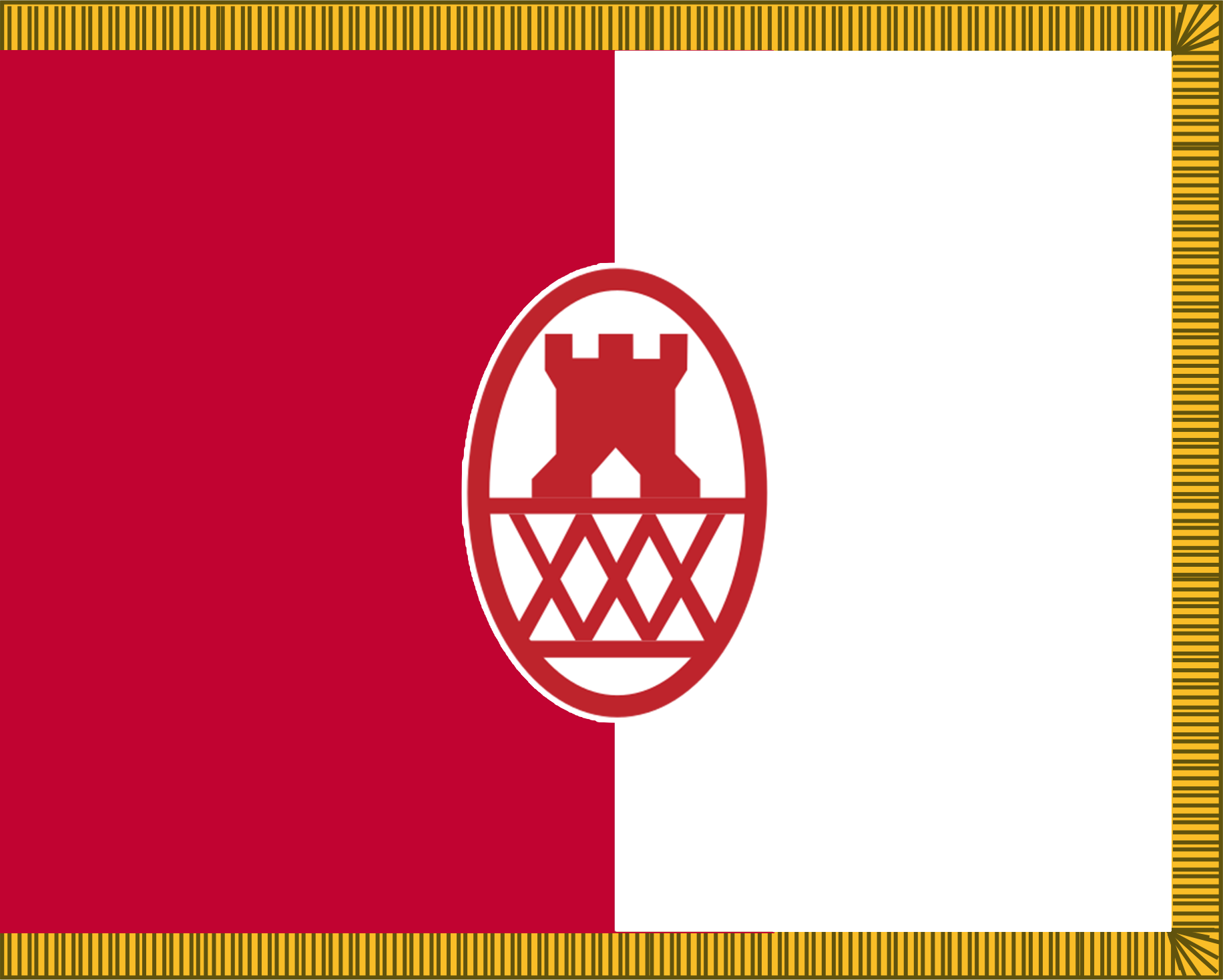
- 30th Engineer Brigade Flag
  November 1, 1973 redesignated HHC Co. 105th Engineer Group (separate)
- October 1, 1978 redesignated HHC, 30th Engineer Brigade. Federalized October 26, 2004 - April 23, 2006
- September 1, 2006 redesignated HHC, 130th Maneuver Enhancement Brigade

== Subordinate Units ==
- 130th Maneuver Enhancement Brigade (NC ARNG) Charlotte Armory
  - Headquarters and Headquarters Company
  - 690th Brigade Support Battalion Kinston Armory
    - Headquarters and Headquarters Company
    - Company A Edenton Armory
    - Company B Farmville Armory
  - 295th Signal Company
  - 105th Engineer Battalion Raeford Armory
    - Headquarters and Headquarters Company
    - Forward Support Company
    - 151st Engineer Company Laurinburg Armory
    - 881st Engineer Company Rockingham Armory
    - 882nd Engineer Company Mocksville Armory
    - 429th Engineer Detachment Butner Armory
  - 505th Engineer Battalion Gastonia Armory
    - Headquarters and Headquarters Company
    - Forward Support Company
    - 875th Engineer Company North Wilkesboro Armory
    - 878th Engineer Company Kings Mountain Armory
    - 883rd Engineer Company Winston-Salem Armory
    - 258th Engineer Detachment Butner Armory
    - 621st Engineer Detachment
    - 823rd Engineer Detachment Elkin Armory
    - 1131st Engineer Detachment Mooresville Armory
    - 725th Engineer Platoon Butner Armory
  - 105th Military Police Battalion Asheville Armory
    - Headquarters and Headquarters Company
    - 210th Military Police Company Franklin Armory
    - 211th Military Police Company Clyde Armory
    - 514th Military Police Company CPT Christopher S. Cash Memorial Armed Forces Reserve Center | Winterville
    - 1132nd Military Police Company Rocky Mount Armory

== Unit deployments ==
In 2026, elements of the 130th MEB were assigned to the Joint Task Force-Southern Border (JTF-SB) in support of Operation Unified Resolve and Operation Ardent Vanguard to increase coverage of the southern border in the Rio Grande Valley.
