= James D. Heriot =

James Davison Heriot
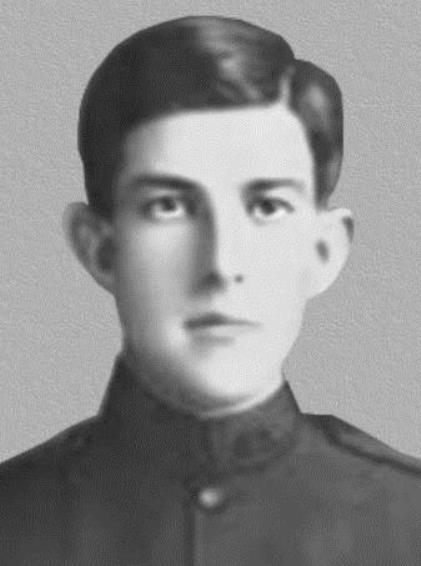
- Heriot in 1917
- Born: November 2, 1890; Spring Hill, South Carolina, U.S.
- Died: October 12, 1918 (aged 27); Vaux-Andigny, France
- Burial place: Rembert Methodist Church, Lee County, South Carolina
- Military career
- Allegiance: United States of America
- Branch: United States Army
- Rank: Corporal
- Units: Company I, 118th Infantry Regiment, 30th Infantry Division
- Conflicts: World War I
- Awards: Medal of Honor

James Davison Heriot (November 2, 1890 – October 12, 1918) was a SC National Guard Soldier from the 118th Infantry Regiment, 30th Infantry Division, United States Army who received the Medal of Honor for his actions during World War I.

== Biography ==
Heriot was born in Spring Hill, South Carolina on November 2, 1890, and died October 12, 1918, in Vaux-Andigny, France. He is buried in Rembert Methodist Church, Lee County, South Carolina. His gravesite is located in the front row of the cemetery plot.

== Medal of Honor citation ==
Rank and organization: Corporal, U.S. Army, Company I, 118th Infantry, 30th Division. Place and date: At Vaux-Andigny, France, October 12, 1918. Entered service at: Spring Hill, SC. Birth: Spring Hill, SC. G.O. No.: 13, W.D., 1919.

Citation:

Cpl. Heriot, with 4 other soldiers, organized a combat group and attacked an enemy machine-gun nest which had been inflicting heavy casualties on his company. In the advance 2 of his men were killed, and because of the heavy fire from all sides the remaining 2 sought shelter. Unmindful of the hazard attached to his mission, Cpl. Heriot, with fixed bayonet, alone charged the machinegun, making his way through the fire for a distance of 30 yards and forcing the enemy to surrender. During this exploit he received several wounds in the arm, and later in the same day, while charging another nest, he was killed.

== See also ==
- List of Medal of Honor recipients
- List of Medal of Honor recipients for World War I
