= 118th Infantry Regiment (United States) =

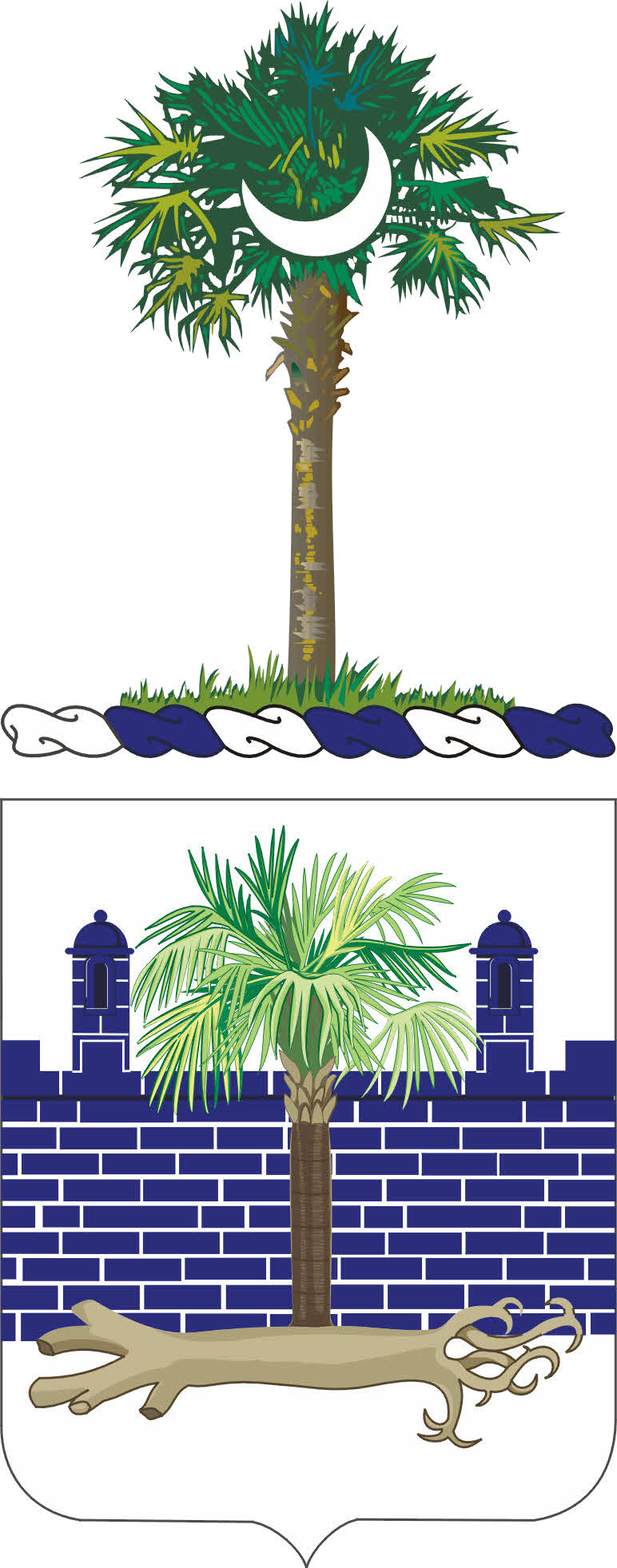
- 118th Infantry Regiment Coat of Arms
- Active: 1846–1848; 1861–1865; 1898; 1917–1918; 1921–present
- Country: United States of America
- Branch: Army National Guard
- Type: Infantry regiment
- Motto: Wherever My Country Calls
- Engagements: Mexican–American War; American Civil War; First Battle of Bull Run, Battle of Williamsburg, Battle of Seven Pines, Battle of Gaines's Mill, Second Battle of Bull Run, Battle of Antietam, Battle of Fredericksburg, Battle of Gettysburg, Battle of Lookout Mountain, Battle of Fort Harrison, Battle of Deep Bottom.; Spanish–American War; World War I; World War II; Operation Enduring Freedom; Operation Iraqi Freedom; Operation Inherent Resolve

Commanders
- Current commander: 1-118 IN - LTC Matthew Stubbs, 4-118 IN - LTC Javier Yudice

Insignia
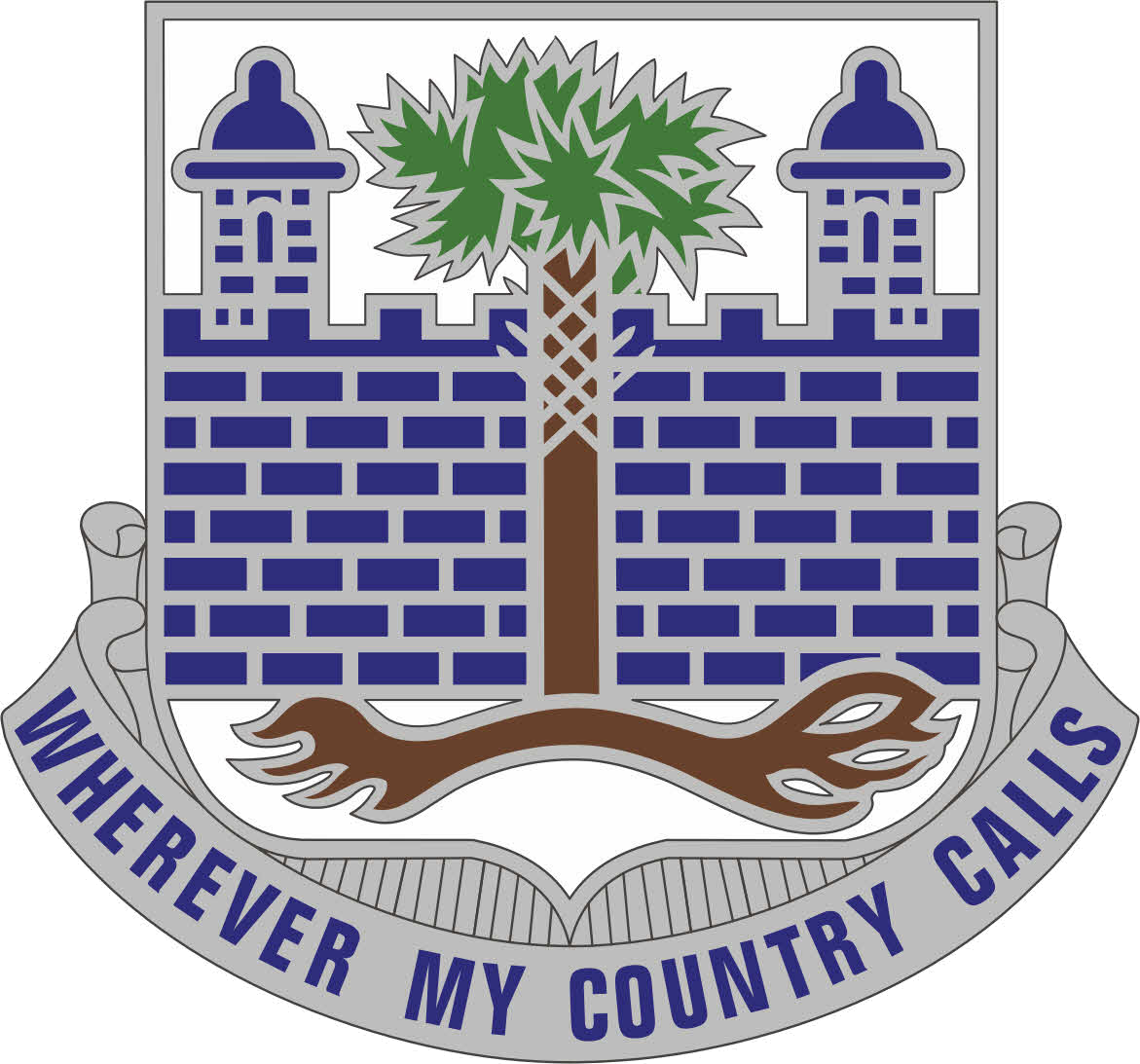
- Distinctive Unit Insignia

The 118th Infantry Regiment is an infantry regiment of the United States Army, South Carolina Army National Guard. It has served the US since the mid-nineteenth century, and is one of the few surviving US Army regiments that can trace its roots to the Confederate States Army. Its 1st Battalion (1–118) is still active and is attached to the 37th IBCT. While the 4th Battalion (4-118) is active and attached to the 30th ABCT.

== History ==
=== Nineteenth century ===
The 118th Infantry Regiment traces its lineage to the year 1846, when the 1st South Carolina Volunteer Infantry was organized for duty in the Mexican–American War. Company E, "Johnson's Rifles", lives on today as 4–118. During the American Civil War, the 1st South Carolina Volunteer Infantry was reorganized into units of the First Corps, Army of Northern Virginia, under General James Longstreet in 1861. The battalions of the South Carolina regiment first saw action at the First Battle of Bull Run, where the Union Army was defeated. They next fought in the Peninsula Campaign, and eventually had to retreat from General George B. McClellan's forces at the Battle of Williamsburg in mid-1862. Shortly after, the South Carolinians fought again at the Battle of Seven Pines, where the Union advance on Richmond, Virginia was stopped even though the Confederate forces did not deliver a decisive defeat. Longstreet's Corps recovered from the losses of the Peninsula Campaign and defeated the Union at the Battle of Gaines's Mill 26 days later, and followed the victory by decisively defeating the Union Army in the Second Battle of Bull Run. The battalions of the original 1st South Carolina took part on the Battle of Antietam on 17 September 1862, the bloodiest single-day battle in American history, with a combined tally of 22,717 dead, wounded, or missing.

In December of the same year, General Robert E. Lee's Army of Northern Virginia defeated Union General Ambrose E. Burnside's Army of the Potomac at the Battle of Fredericksburg, where Union forces repeatedly made frontal assaults across open ground against fortified Confederate positions. The string of southern victories came to an end when Robert E. Lee was decisively defeated at the Battle of Gettysburg between 1 and 3 July 1863 by the Army of the Potomac under General George G. Meade. This is regarded by most historians as the turning point of the Civil War. The Retreat from Gettysburg was arduous, and the weakened South Carolinians were defeated again at the Battle of Lookout Mountain in November 1863. The survivors of the original 1st South Carolina would go on to retreat from Union forces at the Battle of Chaffin's Farm in September 1864, but in their last major action of the war, the Second Battle of Deep Bottom, they forced a Union retreat. After the South's surrender, the 1st South Carolina was called up again in 1898 to participate in the Spanish–American War, but did not see any major combat.

=== World War I ===
Prior to US involvement in the First World War, the predecessors of the 118th were sent to El Paso, Texas in 1916. There, they joined Brig. Gen. John J. "Black Jack" Pershing's Punitive Expedition to protect U.S. border towns from Mexican General Pancho Villa's forces. When America declared war on the German Empire, the various companies of the South Carolina Militia were organized into the 118th Infantry Regiment on 16 April 1917, and assigned to the 30th Division, nicknamed the "Old Hickory" Division. The division consisted of the 117th, the 118th, the 119th, and the 120th Infantry Regiments, along with the 113th, 114th, 115th Machine Gun Battalions, and the 105th Engineer Regiment. Soldiers from North Carolina, South Carolina, Georgia, and Tennessee comprised the division when it shipped off to France for combat on the Western Front. The 118th joined the US Army II Corps, which served in the north alongside British forces. The fighting in the II Corps area was heavy, and six soldiers of the 118th Infantry received the Medal of Honor for their actions during this time: three on 8 October 1918, and one each on 11 October, 12 October and 15 October.

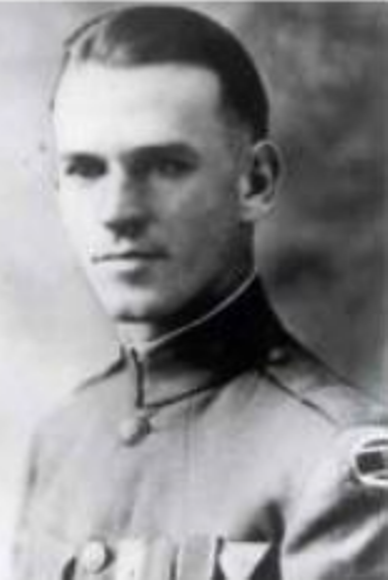
Corporal John C. Villepigue WWI Medal of Honor recipient

On 8 October, 1LT James C. Dozier of G Company, was in command of 2 platoons, and was painfully wounded in the shoulder early in the attack, but he continued to lead his men displaying the highest bravery and skill. When his command was held up by heavy machine-gun fire, he disposed his men in the best cover available and with a soldier continued forward to attack a machine-gun nest. Creeping up to the position in the face of intense fire, he killed the entire crew with hand grenades and his pistol and a little later captured a number of Germans who had taken refuge in a dugout nearby. SGT Gary Evans Foster of F Company, showed great leadership when his company was held up by violent machine-gun fire from a sunken road. With an officer, Foster went forward to attack the hostile machine-gun nests. The officer was wounded, but Foster continued on alone in the face of the heavy fire and by effective use of hand grenades and his pistol killed several of the enemy and captured 18. SGT Thomas L. Hall of G Company also earned the Medal of Honor on 8 October. Having overcome two machine-gun nests under his leadership, Hall's platoon was stopped 800 yards from its final objective by machine-gun fire of particular intensity. Ordering his men to take cover in a sunken road, he advanced alone on the enemy machine-gun post and killed 5 members of the crew with his bayonet and thereby made possible the further advance of the line. While attacking another machine-gun nest later in the day this gallant soldier was mortally wounded. After the massive attacks on 8 October, another 118th soldier earned the Medal of Honor on 12 October. Corporal James D. Heriot of I Company organized a combat group with four other soldiers, attacking a German machine-gun nest that had inflicted heavy casualties on the company. Two of the soldiers were killed and due to the heavy fire the remaining two sought shelter. Heriot charged the machine-gun and forced the crew to surrender. He was wounded several times in the arm and was killed later that day while charging a nest. The heroism of these men and the intensity of the actions they fought in are just microcosms of what was happening all along the 118th Infantry's front line.

=== Interwar period ===
The 118th Infantry arrived at the port of Charleston on 27 March 1919 on the USS Pocahontas and was demobilized on 1 April 1919 at Camp Jackson, South Carolina. It was reconstituted in the National Guard in 1921, assigned to the 30th Division, and allotted to the state of South Carolina. The regiment was reorganized 19 December 1921 by redesignation of the 1st Infantry, South Carolina National Guard (headquarters organized 28 April 1918 and federally recognized at Columbia, South Carolina) as the 118th Infantry. The headquarters was relocated on 5 December 1932 to Charleston, South Carolina. The regiment, or elements thereof, was called up to perform the following state duties: regiment performed riot control duty for a merchant marine strike at Charleston in May 1921; 1st Battalion performed riot control duty for elections at Mayond, South Carolina, in 1923; elements performed riot control duty in Abbeville and Walterboro, South Carolina, 8–19 April 1932; regiment performed riot control duty for textile workers’ strike at Spartanburg, Greenville, and Chester, South Carolina, in 1934. The regiment conducted annual summer training most years at Camp Jackson, from 1921–39.

=== World War II ===
While Germany and Fascist Italy were in the process of conquering most of Europe in 1939 and 1940, and the Empire of Japan grabbing territory in the Pacific and China, the United States felt unprepared in the event war was necessary to combat the Axis powers and began mobilizing its army in response. The Selective Training and Service Act of 1940 which allowed the government to draft US citizens, was passed, and all available National Guard divisions were inducted into Federal Service within a year. On 16 September 1940, the 118th Infantry Regiment was inducted into federal service. It then moved to Fort Jackson on 21 September 1940. The 118th trained with the division until August 1942, when they were separated. Due to the restructuring of the United States Army in the early 1940s, the square division concept gave way to the triangular division concept (where three infantry regiments were supported by more versatile elements rather than relying more heavily on infantry firepower), the 118th was released from the 30th Infantry Division's command and became temporarily independent. They left Fort Jackson and went to Camp Kilmer, New Jersey, and departed from New York City on 5 August 1942 bound for Iceland. Arriving there for occupation duty on 19 August, the regiment was permanently relieved from assignment to the 30th Infantry Division on 24 August 1942. The 118th arrived in France on 13 December 1944 and was rushed to the city of Givet to defend a bridge across the Meuse River against the German counteroffensive during the Battle of the Bulge. The regiment moved into Germany on 26 May 1945 for the Occupation of Germany, and was deactivated upon return to the United States on 15 January 1946.

=== Post World War II - Gulf War Era ===
The 118th Infantry Regiment was reactivated during the Cold War and became part of the 218th Infantry Brigade (Mechanized) in 1974. The regiment has stepped up to serve at home many times, aiding authorities in the wake of civil disturbances and natural disasters like Hurricane Hugo in 1989.

=== Twenty-first century ===
After the September 11 attacks, 4–118 was mobilized to participate in Operation Noble Eagle, and 1–118 was deployed to Iraq two years later, in 2003, in support of Operation Iraqi Freedom. Also, in 2003 A CO 4-118 IN deployed to Bosnia SFOR 13. From 2007 to 2008, 4–118 was deployed to Afghanistan in support of Operation Enduring Freedom, as part of the 218th Brigade. The two battalions of the 118th have also deployed to Kuwait, Djibouti, and Kosovo for training and security purposes between 2003 and the present.

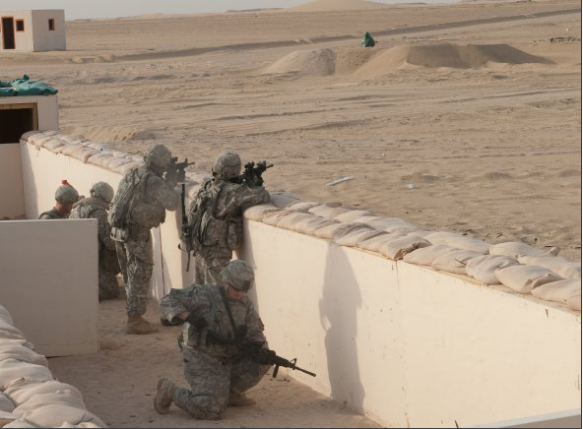
Soldiers of A Company, 4th Battalion, 118th Infantry Regiment engage targets after assaulting and clearing a trench system, one of their objectives during a platoon live-fire exercise at the Udairi Range Complex in northern Kuwait, 31 July 2012.

4th Battalion deployed to Kuwait and was based at Camp Buehring in April 2012. At the base, the battalion provided security and camp operations missions. The battalion also conducted training exercises with Kuwaiti military units. The deployment ended in December 2012.

In October 2015, the 1st and 4th Battalions participated in relief and recovery efforts after the widespread flooding in South Carolina caused by the October 2015 North American storm complex.

In October 2016, both Battalions assisted with relief and recovery efforts during Hurricane Matthew.

In September 2017, the 4th Battalion sent Soldiers to the coast of South Carolina to provide relief during Hurricane Irma. Soldiers from the 1st Battalion were sent to Florida to help assist units from the Florida Army National Guard during Hurricane Irma.

In September 2018, both Battalions assisted with relief efforts during Hurricane Florence.

In October 2019, the 4th Battalion and a detachment of 1st Battalion soldiers attached to Bravo Company, 1st Battalion, 120th Infantry Regiment deployed to Camp Buehring, Kuwait in support of Operation Spartan Shield under the 30th Armored Brigade Combat Team. During that time, Cobra Company, 4th Battalion sent a platoon to Syria with M2 Bradley Fighting Vehicles and Battle Company, 4th Battalion was sent to Iraq in support of Operation Inherent Resolve, while Bravo Company, 1-120th and its detachment of 1st Battalion soldiers was sent to Saudi Arabia in support of Operation Spartan Shield. Soldiers returned home by September 2020. While deployed, the 4th Battalion conducted the first ever Expert Soldier Badge test in the Army National Guard.
