= USS Pocahontas =

USS Pocahontas may refer to one of the following United States Navy ships honoring Pocahontas, the Algonquian Indian daughter of Powhatan and wife of American colonist and Virginia tobacco grower John Rolfe:

- USS Pocahontas (1852), a screw steamer purchased by the Navy at Boston 20 March 1855; commissioned as Despatch 17 January 1856, and renamed Pocahontas on 27 January 1860.
- USS Pocahontas (AT-18), an ocean tug renamed Chemung 1 September 1917.
- USS Pocahontas (ID-3044), the German vessel Princess Irene, seized by the United States in 1917, which served as a troop transport during World War I.
- USS Pocahontas (YT-266), a tug transferred to Naval service in December 1942.
