= Thomas L. Hall =

American soldier and Medal of Honor recipient

- Born: 1895; Fort Mill, South Carolina
- Died: October 8, 1918 (aged 24–25); Near Montbrehain, France
- Burial place: Unity Cemetery, Fort Mill South Carolina
- Military career
- Allegiance: United States of America
- Branch: United States Army
- Rank: Sergeant
- Service number: 1311284
- Units: Company G, 118th Infantry Regiment, 30th Infantry Division
- Conflicts: World War I
- Awards: Medal of Honor

Thomas Lee Hall (January 8, 1895–October 8, 1918) was a S.C. National Guard Soldier from the 118th Infantry Regiment, 30th Infantry Division serving with the United States Army. He received the Medal of Honor for his actions during World War I.

== Biography ==
Thomas Lee Hall was born in Fort Mill, South Carolina in 1895 and died October 8, 1918, near Montbrehain, France. He is buried in Unity Cemetery, Fort Mill, South Carolina. His gravesite is located in the World War I plot.

A native of Fort Mill, Tom Hall was born Jan. 8, 1895, the son of William Lee Hall and Frances Coble Hall. He had an older brother, George and a younger sister, Lila. Lee Hall, Tom's father, operated a grocery store on Main Street and a farm while serving as mayor of Fort Mill. Tom helped out in the store until 1908 when his father gave up merchandising to manage the Springfield farm north of town. The family moved into the historic home, built in 1806, by John Springs III.

Tom was a member of Fort Mill's National Guard, Co. G in July 1916 when the unit was sent to the Mexican border to protect American citizens and property from raids by Poncho Villa and his forces. His sister, Lila Hall Eubanks, later recalled, "Tom enjoyed this. There was little fighting and a relaxed atmosphere."

It was a different story when Company G, led by Captain S. W. Parks, left Fort Mill to join the Old Hickory Division at Camp Sevier in Greenville during October 1917. The men knew they were on their way to World War I's bloody western front. They departed from New York, NY on May 11, 1918. They landed in Calais, France, on May 24, 1918.

The first combat action of the 30th Division came when the soldiers faced the German Hindenburg Line on Aug. 31, 1918. For a month they traded shots with the Germans and then on Sept. 29, the division "plowed its way with shot and shell through that series of German forts, hitherto considered impregnable."

In the next three weeks, Sept. 29 to Oct. 20, the 30th Infantry Division captured 98 German officers and 3,750 enlisted men. Three German officers and 24 men of the division were taken prisoner. The Americans had 44 officers and 1,011 men killed while 113 officers and 4,823 men wounded.

The worst day of the war for the Fort Mill men was Oct. 8,1918, in Monbrehain, France. Company G started the day with 185 men and at the end there were 37 who were not wounded. That was the day Sgt. Tom Hall was killed in action.

Hall's commanding officer described his actions this way: "Sgt. Hall succeeded in knocking out several hostile machine gun posts.

On one occasion while advancing his platoon, German machine guns were interfering seriously with the advance of his men. Sgt. Hall discovered the Germans in a nearby shell hold. Not willing to sacrifice his men, he advanced alone and wiped out five German soldiers with his bayonet. Later that day, while advancing on another machine gun post, Hall was mortally wounded by machine gun fire. His skill of leadership and his conduct in the face of danger won the admiration of all ranks.

The Medal of Honor was awarded posthumously and accepted by his father in a special ceremony in Fort Mill's Confederate Park July 20, 1919. In July 1922, Lee Hall accepted two more awards in honor of his son.

Fort Mill was proud of Thomas Lee Hall, the 123 other Fort Mill residents who served in World War I, and renamed "Booth" street (named after John Wilkes Booth.) to Tom Hall Street. The town had more commissioned officers than any other town of its size in the United States: a lieutenant colonel, three majors, six captains and five lieutenants. There were five Medal of Honor winners in South Carolina. There were 96 recipients in the United States.

== Medal of Honor citation ==
Rank and organization: Sergeant, U.S. Army, Company G, 118th Infantry, 30th Division. Place and date. Near Montbrehain, France, 8 October 1918. Entered service at: Fort Mill, S.C. Birth: Fort Mill, S.C., G.O. No.: 50, W.D., 1919.

Citation:

Having overcome 2 machine gun nests under his skillful leadership, Sgt. Hall's platoon was stopped 800 yards from its final objective by machine gun fire of particular intensity. Ordering his men to take cover in a sunken road, he advanced alone on the enemy machine gun post and killed 5 members of the crew with his bayonet and thereby made possible the further advance of the line. While attacking another machine gun nest later in the day, this gallant soldier was mortally wounded.

== See also ==
- List of Medal of Honor recipients
- List of Medal of Honor recipients for World War I
