= Gary Evans Foster =

Gary E. Foster
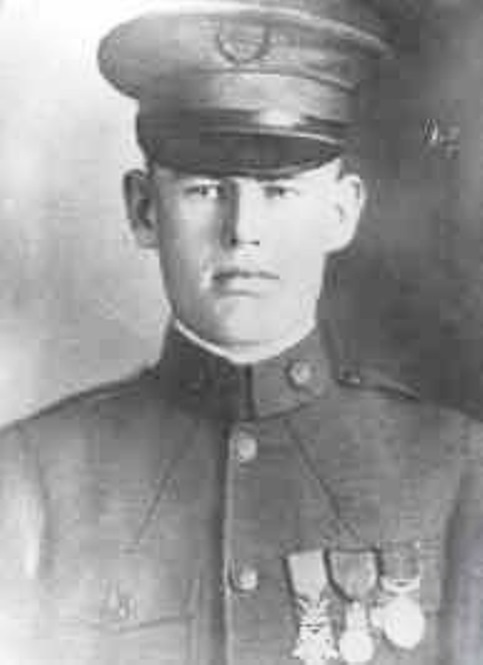
- Medal of Honor recipient
- Born: November 6, 1894; Spartanburg, South Carolina, US
- Died: July 22, 1951 (aged 56)
- Burial place: New Prospect Baptist Church Cemetery Chesnee, South Carolina
- Military career
- Allegiance: United States of America
- Branch: United States Army
- Rank: Sergeant
- Service number: 1311059
- Units: Company F, 118th Infantry Regiment, 30th Division
- Conflicts: World War I
- Awards: Medal of Honor

Gary Evans Foster (November 6, 1894 – July 22, 1951) was a S.C. National Guard soldier serving in the United States Army during World War I who received the Medal of Honor for bravery.

== Biography ==
Foster was born November 6, 1894, in Spartanburg, South Carolina and after enlisting in the United States Army was sent to France to fight in World War I.

After returning home from the war, Foster attended Clemson College.

He died July 22, 1951, and is buried in New Prospect Baptist Church Cemetery, Chesnee, South Carolina.

== Medal of Honor citation ==
Rank and organization: Sergeant, U.S. Army, Company F, 118th Infantry, 30th Division. Place and date: Near Montbrehain, France, 8 October 1918. Entered service at: Inman, S.C. Birth: Spartanburg, S.C. G.O. No.: 16, W.D., 1919.

Citation:

When his company was held up by violent machinegun fire from a sunken road, Sgt. Foster with an officer went forward to attack the hostile machinegun nests. The officer was wounded, but Sgt. Foster continued on alone in the face of the heavy fire and by effective use of handgrenades and his pistol killed several of the enemy and captured 18.

== See also ==
- List of Medal of Honor recipients
- List of Medal of Honor recipients for World War I
