= USS Chemung (AT-18) =

Tugboat of the United States Navy

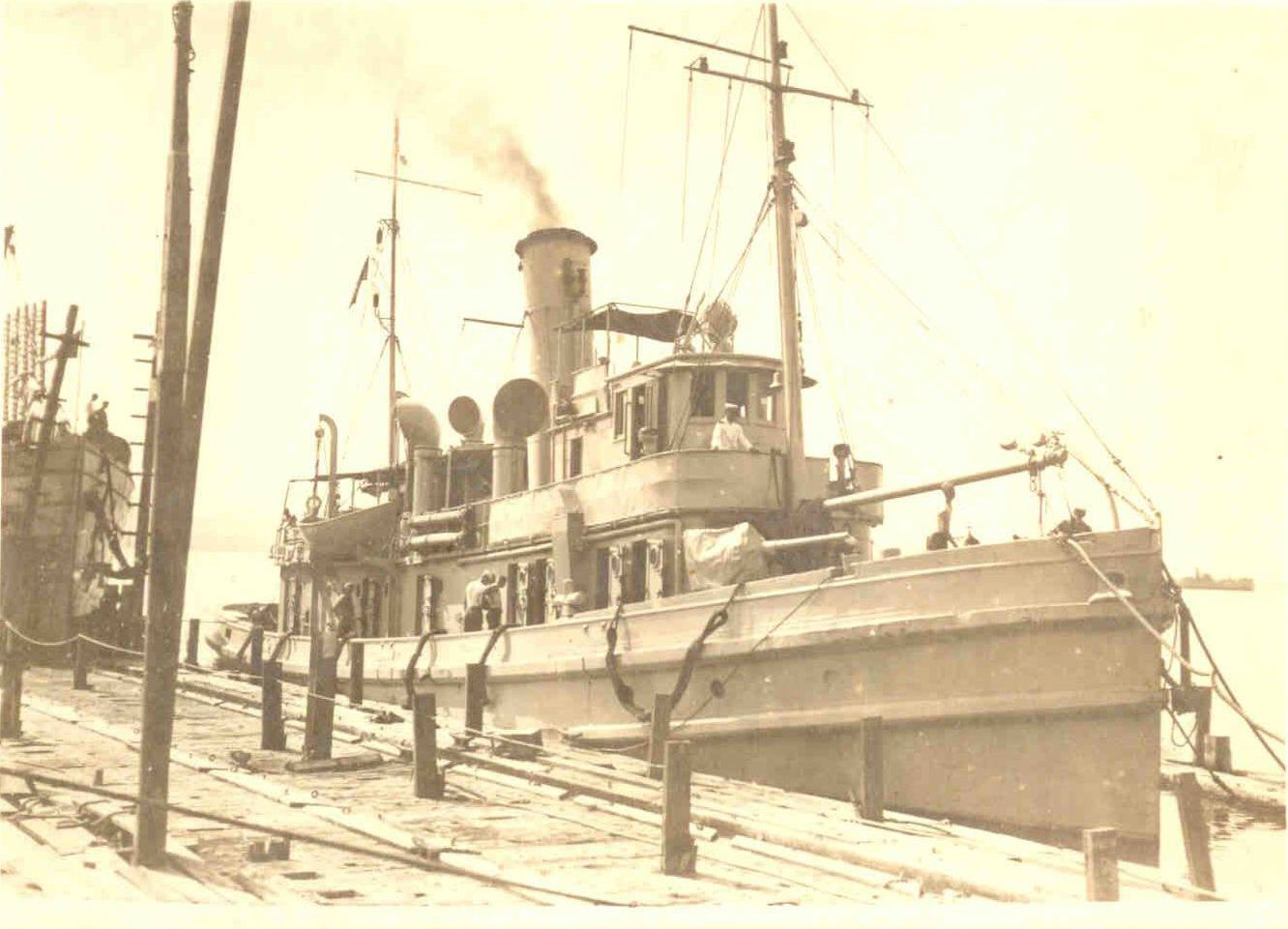
- USS Chemung at Guantanamo Bay in February 1919

History

United States
- Name: USS Chemung
- Builder: Norfolk Navy Yard
- Launched: 1 April 1916, as Pocahontas
- Commissioned: 14 March 1917
- Decommissioned: 25 October 1936
- Renamed: Chemung, 1 September 1917
- Fate: Sold, 12 February 1937

General characteristics
- Type: Minesweeper
- Displacement: 575 long tons (584 t)
- Length: 123 ft 6 in (37.64 m)
- Beam: 26 ft 8 in (8.13 m)
- Draft: 11 ft 6 in (3.51 m)
- Speed: 11 knots (20 km/h; 13 mph)
- Complement: 46
- Armament: 2 × 3-pounder guns

The first USS Chemung (AT-18/YT-124) was launched 1 April 1916 by Norfolk Navy Yard as Pocahontas and commissioned 14 March 1917. She reported to the 5th Naval District.

After minesweeping operations off the Virginia and Maryland coasts, Pocahontas was renamed Chemung on 1 September 1917 and on 19 November 1917 was permanently assigned to Train, Atlantic Fleet, 5th Naval District, for operations in the Norfolk area until 27 January 1919 when she departed for Guantánamo Bay, Cuba. Arriving 3 February, Chemung served in the Caribbean until 9 April.

In March she towed the disabled HMS Shearwater into Kingston, Jamaica; for this humanitarian operation she was commended by the British Ministry at Jamaica.

Chemung arrived at New York 19 April 1919 for coastwise operations throughout the summer on range and torpedo practice, then gave local services at New York until 10 January 1920 when she sailed to serve at Charleston, South Carolina, Key West, Fla., and in the Caribbean.

In April 1920 she heroically rescued the crew of the burning Canadian schooner J. T. Ralston and carried them to San Domingo, for which she was commended by the British legation there.

Chemung served as yard tug at the United States Naval Academy from 14 May 1921 until 25 August 1926 when she sailed to Philadelphia.

Chemung was decommissioned 25 October 1926 and sold 12 February 1937. Her classification had been changed to YT-124, 31 January 1936.
