= Operation Ardent Vanguard =

In January 2025, U.S. president Donald Trump signed executive orders declaring an emergency at the southern border and directed U.S. Northern Command to take action. USNORTHCOM has since deployed more than 10,000 members of the military to the mission of Operation Ardent Vanguard. The operation has deployed members of the U.S. Army, U.S. Marine Corps, U.S. Air Force and the national guard. The troops conduct foot patrols, horseback patrols, fly drones, and are deploying both the Army Multi-Purpose High Energy Laser (AMP-HEL) and the Mobile Vehicle Surveillance System (MVSS).

== Operation Unified Resolve ==
(For 2003 Afghanistan operation see Operation Unified Resolve)

On 2 October 2026, the Joint Task Force-Southern Border (JTF-SB) began Operation Unified Resolve to increase the presence of the U.S. military on the southern border in the Rio Grande Valley. The troops in that area will be supporting local law enforcement, the Department of Homeland Security and Customs and Border Protection. The operation is a part of the larger Operation Ardent Vanguard.

U.S. Northern Command stated that the operation was a result of increased reports of cartel violence along the border, including an incident involving the U.S. Coast Guard near Garceno, Texas. The Rio Grande Valley contains several large population centers including Brownsville, McAllen, Mission, Rio Grande City and Roma and has been a magnet for cartel activity including human smuggling, drug trafficking and drones used against law enforcement.
