= Vaux-Andigny =

- Commune
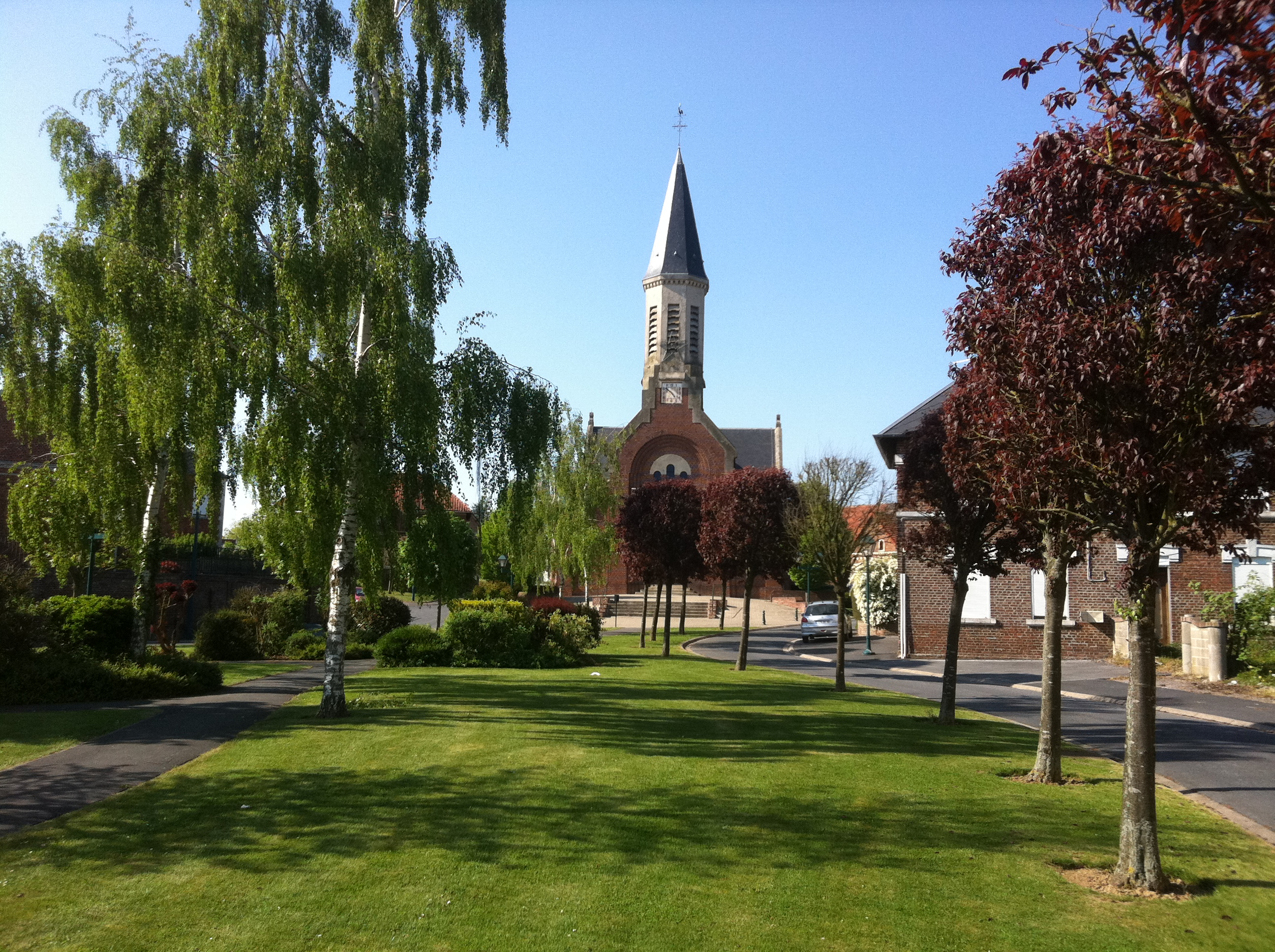
- The church of Vaux-Andigny
- Location of Vaux-Andigny
- Location within France Location within Hauts-de-France
- Coordinates: 50°01′26″N 3°30′51″E
- Country: France
- Region: Hauts-de-France
- Department: Aisne
- Arrondissement: Vervins
- Canton: Guise

Government
  - Mayor (2026–32): Michel Gendre
- Area^{1}: 15.75 km^{2} (6.08 sq mi)
- Elevation: 129 m (423 ft)
- Highest elevation: 169 m (554 ft)
- Lowest elevation: 121 m (397 ft)
- Population (2023): 924
  - Density: 58.7/km^{2} (152/sq mi)
- Time zone: UTC+01:00 (CET)
  - Summer (DST): UTC+02:00 (CEST)
- INSEE/Postal code: 02769 /02110
- ^{1} French Land Register data, which excludes lakes, ponds, glaciers > 1 km^{2} (0.386 sq mi or 247 acres) and river estuaries.

Vaux-Andigny (French pronunciation: [vo ɑ̃diɲi]) is a commune in the Aisne department in Hauts-de-France in northern France.

== Population ==
Historical population
Year	Pop.	±% p.a.
1968	926	—
1975	854	−1.15%
1982	847	−0.12%
1990	833	−0.21%
1999	902	+0.89%
2007	952	+0.68%
2012	961	+0.19%
2017	923	−0.80%
2023	924	+0.02%
Source: INSEE

== See also ==
- Communes of the Aisne department
