= 30th Infantry Division (United States) =

- Shoulder sleeve insignia
- Active: 18 July 1917–7 May 1919; 14 August 1926–25 November 1945; 21 February 1947–1 December 1973; became 30th Infantry Brigade
- Country: United States
- Branch: United States Army
- Type: Infantry
- Size: Division
- Nicknames: "Old Hickory" ”Roosevelt’s SS”
- Engagements: World War I; Somme Offensive; Ypres-Lys; Flanders 1918; World War II; Normandy; Northern France; Rhineland; Ardennes-Alsace; Central Europe

Commanders
- Notable commanders: William Hood Simpson; Leland Hobbs

The 30th Infantry Division was a United States Army unit of the National Guard that served in World War I and World War II. It was nicknamed the "Old Hickory" division, in honor of President Andrew Jackson. The Germans nicknamed this division "Roosevelt's SS". The 30th Infantry Division, involved in 282 days of intense combat over a period from June 1944 through April 1945, was regarded by a team of historians led by S.L.A. Marshall as the American infantry division that had "performed the most efficient and consistent battle services" in the European Theater of Operations (ETO). In the present day, the division's lineage continues as 30th Armored Brigade Combat Team, part of the North Carolina National Guard. The unit's most recent combat deployment was in 2019.

== History ==
=== World War I ===
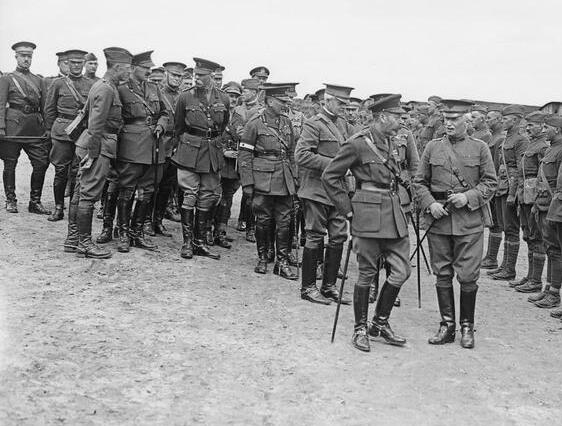
British King George V, along with Major General Edward M. Lewis, commander of the U.S. 30th Division, review elements of Lewis's division in France, August 6, 1918. Standing behind the King is Brigadier General Samson L. Faison, commanding the 30th Division's 60th Brigade.

The division was originally activated as the 9th Division (drawing units from the National Guard of North Carolina, South Carolina, Virginia and Tennessee) under a 1917 force plan, but changed designation to the 30th Division after the American entry into World War I in April 1917. From August 28, 1917 to May 1. 1918, the 30th Division trained at Camp Sevier in Taylors, South Carolina. It was formally activated under its new title in October 1917.

In May 1918, the division was sent to Europe and arrived in England, where it departed for the Western Front soon after. The division, along with the 27th Division, was assigned to the U.S. II Corps but did not serve with the main American Expeditionary Force (AEF) and was instead attached to the Second Army of the British Expeditionary Force (BEF), trading American equipment for British equipment.

The major operations the 30th Division took part in were the Ypres-Lys, and the Somme offensive, in which it was one of the two American divisions assigned to the Fourth British Army that broke the Hindenburg Line on September 29, 1918. The Thirtieth Division broke through on its entire front, taking Bellicourt and part of Nauroy by noon of the 29th. The Australian 5th Division, coming up at this time, continued the attack with elements of the 30th division. The division had, in three months, from July until October 1918, sustained 1,237 officers and men killed in action (KIA), with a further 7,178 wounded in action (WIA) or missing in action (MIA).

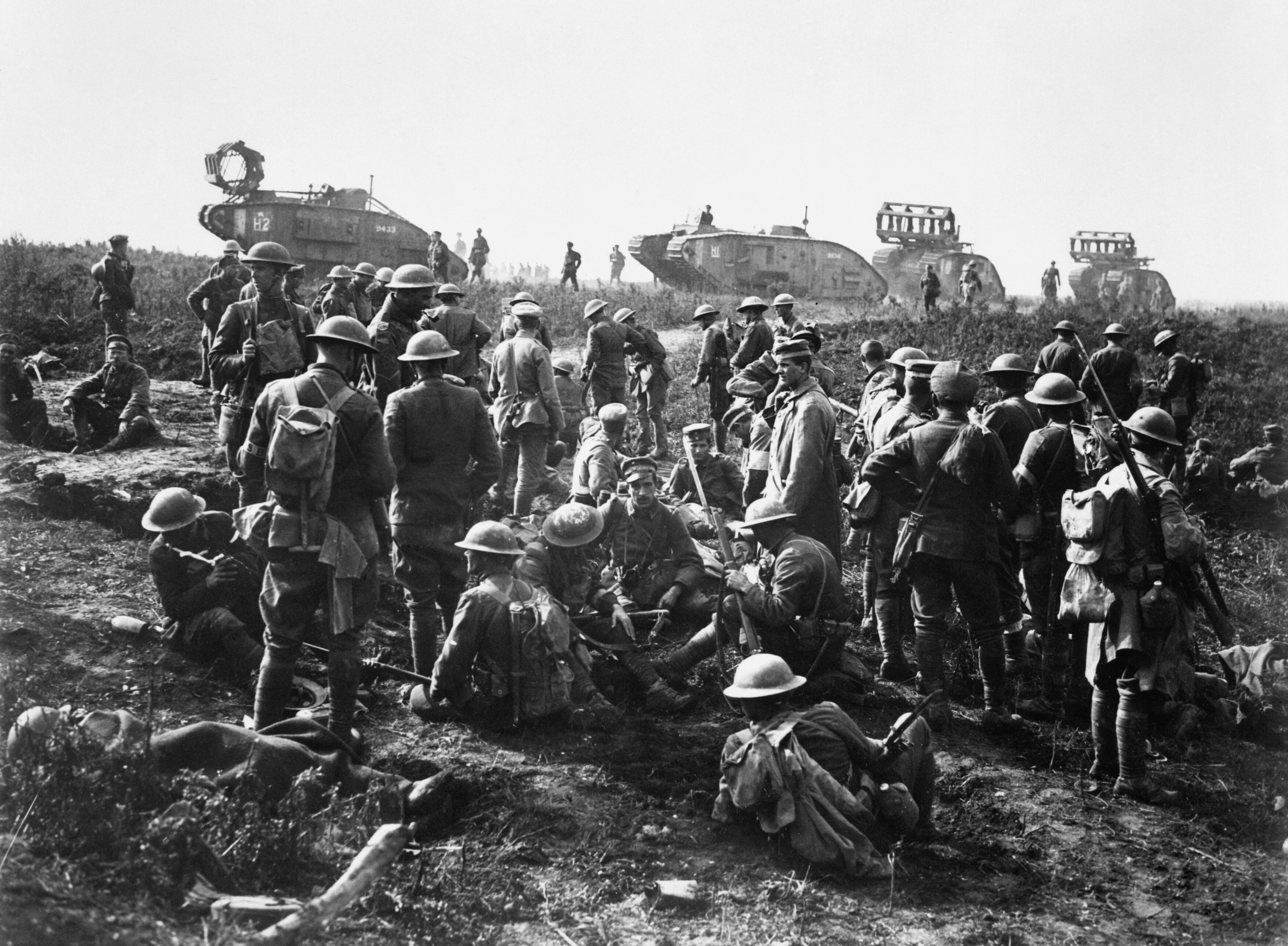
Doughboys of the U.S. 30th Division at rest with German prisoners following the capture of Bellicourt, France, September 29, 1918.

==== WWI Division organization ====
- Headquarters, 30th Division
- 59th Infantry Brigade
  - 117th Infantry Regiment (3rd Tennessee Infantry)
  - 118th Infantry Regiment (1st South Carolina Infantry, detachments from 2nd and 3rd Battalions, 1st North Carolina Infantry, and 3rd Battalion, 2nd South Carolina Infantry)
  - 114th Machine Gun Battalion (Troops A, B, and C, 1st Squadron Tennessee Cavalry)
- 60th Infantry Brigade
  - 119th Infantry Regiment (2nd North Carolina Infantry, 1st Battalion, Headquarters Company (less band), Supply Company, and detachments from 2nd and 3rd Battalions, 2nd Tennessee Infantry, and detachments from 1st North Carolina Infantry)
  - 120th Infantry Regiment (3rd North Carolina Infantry, detachments from 2nd and 3rd Battalions, 2nd Tennessee Infantry and 1st North Carolina Infantry, and band, 2nd Tennessee Infantry)
  - 115th Machine Gun Battalion (Machine Gun Troop, North Carolina Cavalry, Troops B and C, 1st Squadron, North Carolina Cavalry, and detachment from 2nd Battalion, 1st North Carolina Infantry)
- 55th Field Artillery Brigade
  - 113th Field Artillery Regiment (1st North Carolina Field Artillery and detachments from 1st North Carolina Infantry)
  - 114th Field Artillery Regiment (1st Tennessee Field Artillery and detachment from 2nd Battalion, 1st North Carolina Infantry)
  - 115th Field Artillery Regiment (1st Tennessee Infantry, less Machine Gun Company, detachment from 2nd Battalion, 2nd Tennessee Infantry, and detachment from 3rd Battalion, 1st North Carolina Infantry)
  - 105th Trench Mortar Battery (Troop D, Tennessee Cavalry)
- 113th Machine Gun Battalion (Machine Gun Company, 1st Tennessee Infantry, as Company A; Machine Gun Company, 2nd Tennessee Infantry, as Company B; Machine Gun Company, 1st North Carolina Infantry, as Company C; Machine Gun Company, 2d South Carolina Infantry as, Company D; detachments of 2nd Battalion. 2nd Tennessee Infantry and 2nd Battalion, 1st North Carolina Infantry)
- 105th Engineer Regiment (Companies A, B, and C, North Carolina Engineers, and Sanitary Detachment, Supply Company, Band, and Companies B, C, and D, 1st North Carolina Infantry)
- 105th Field Signal Battalion (Company A, North Carolina Signal Corps as nucleus)
- Headquarters Troop, 30th Division (Troop A, South Carolina Cavalry)
- 105th Train Headquarters and Military Police (Sanitary Detachment and Headquarters Company (loss band), 2nd South Carolina Infantry, and Troops A and D, 1st Squadron, North Carolina Cavalry)
  - 105th Ammunition Train (1st and 2d Battalions, 2nd South Carolina Infantry, and detachments from 2nd and 3rd Battalions, 1st North Carolina Infantry)
  - 105th Supply Train (North Carolina Supply Train, Supply Company, 2nd South Carolina Infantry, and individual transfers)
  - 105th Engineer Train (Company A, 1st North Carolina Infantry)
  - 105th Sanitary Train (1st North Carolina Ambulance Company, 1st North Carolina Field Hospital, 1st Tennessee Field Hospital, 1st South Carolina Field Hospital, and individual transfers)
    - 117th, 118th, 119th, and 120th Ambulance Companies and Field Hospitals

=== Interwar period ===
The 30th Division headquarters arrived at the port of Charleston, South Carolina, aboard the USS Madawaska on 2 April 1919 after 11 months of overseas service and was demobilized on 7 May 1919 at Camp Jackson, South Carolina. In accordance with the National Defense Act of 1920, the division was allotted to the states of Georgia, North Carolina, South Carolina, and Tennessee, and assigned to the IV Corps. The division headquarters was reorganized and federally recognized 24 August 1926 at 121 Capitol Square, Atlanta, Georgia. The division headquarters was relocated on 20 September 1932 to Macon, Georgia. The designated mobilization training center for the “Old Hickory” Division was Camp Jackson, where much of the division's training activities occurred between the wars. For most years, the division's subordinate units held separate summer camps at locations usually within their respective states: Tybee Island or St. Simons Island for Georgia units; Camp Glenn near Morehead City for North Carolina units; Camp Jackson for South Carolina units; Camp Peay near Tullahoma or Camp John Sevier near Greenville, South Carolina for Tennessee units. The division staff, composed of personnel from all four states, came together to conduct joint training for several summers before World War II. The division staff usually assembled at Camp Jackson most summers, but conducted their training at Tybee Island for at least one camp. The division also participated in several corps area and army-level command post exercises.

The first opportunity that the division's units had to operate together came in 1928 when the entire “Old Hickory” Division was assembled at Camp Jackson from 8–22 July under a War Department experimental program designed to bring together multistate National Guard divisions for joint training. The experiment was declared a success, but due to budget constraints, the program was never fully implemented. The division was assembled again for the 1932 camp, but units were staggered over a 6-week period, so no large-scale training was conducted. The next opportunity came in August 1938 when the division was assembled at the DeSoto National Forest in Mississippi for the Fourth Corps Area concentration of the Third Army maneuvers. In that maneuver, the “Old Hickory” Division operated as part of the provisional IV Corps. The division's final training event before induction came in August 1940 when the 30th Division participated in the Third Army maneuvers in the Kisatchie National Forest near Alexandria, Louisiana. For that maneuver, the division again operated as part of the IV Corps against the provisional VIII Corps. The division was inducted into active federal service at home stations on 16 September 1940, assigned to the IV Corps, and ordered to move to Camp Jackson, where it arrived about 20 September 1940. After the division's initial train-up period, it participated in the VII Corps Tennessee Maneuvers in May–June 1941, and in the Carolina Maneuvers as part of the I Corps near Cheraw-Chesterfield, South Carolina, in November 1941 At this time, the 121st Infantry Regiment was relieved from the division and reassigned to the 8th Infantry Division. In late 1941, the division lost approximately 6,000 men when one-year enlistments in the Army of the United States expired and other men were released from active duty for hardship to their dependents as stipulated by Congress.

=== World War II ===
==== WWII division organization ====
===== Square division =====
On 16 September 1940, the 30th Division was inducted into federal service at home stations and then assembled at Fort Jackson in South Carolina. It was one of four National Guard divisions to be inducted into federal service for a one-year period that day. The other divisions were the 41st Division, 44th Division and 45th Division. At the time the division still retained its World War I square organization and consisted of the following units.

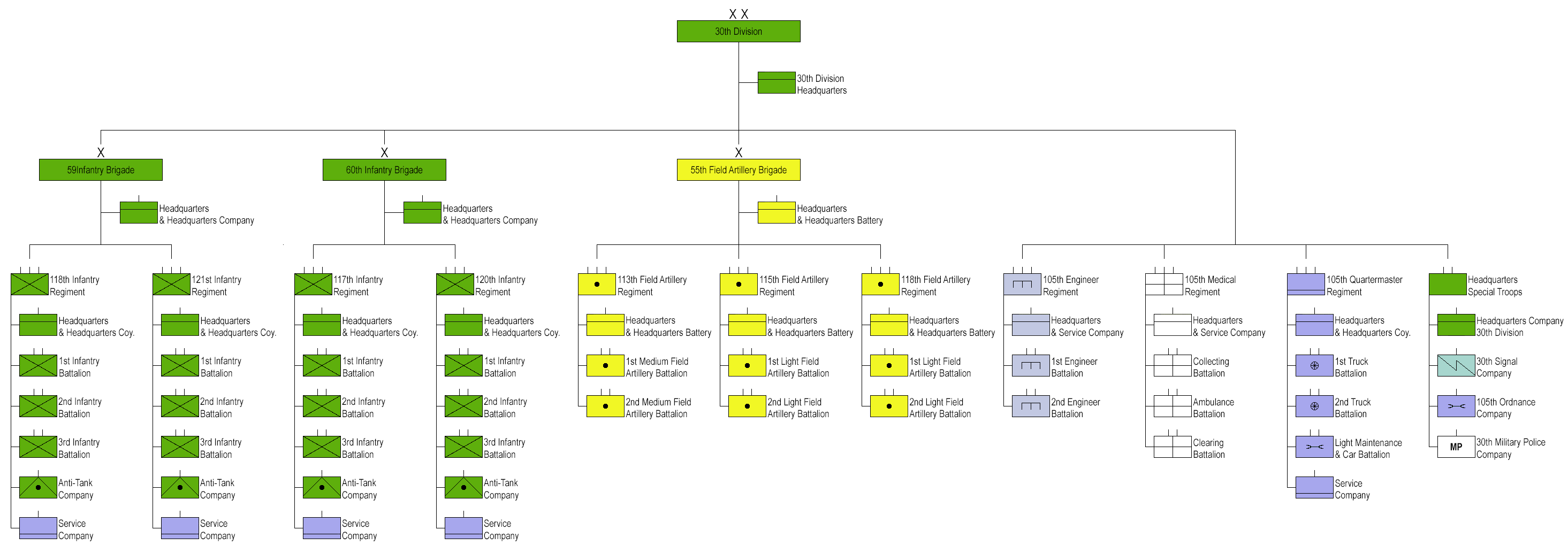
30th Division square organization (click to enlarge)

- 30th Division, in Macon (GA)
  - 30th Division Headquarters
  - 59th Infantry Brigade, in Columbia (SC)
    - Headquarters and Headquarters Company
    - 118th Infantry Regiment, in Charleston (SC)
      - Headquarters and Headquarters Company
      - 3× Infantry battalions
        - each battalion consists of: 1× Headquarters and Headquarters Detachment, 3× Rifle companies, 1× Weapons Company
      - Anti-Tank Company (M3 37mm Anti-Tank guns)
      - Service Company
    - 121st Infantry Regiment, in Macon (GA) (transferred on 22 November 1941 to the 8th Infantry Division)
      - same organization as 118th Infantry Regiment
  - 60th Infantry Brigade, in Graham (NC)
    - Headquarters and Headquarters Company
    - 117th Infantry Regiment, in Knoxville (TN)
      - same organization as 118th Infantry Regiment
    - 120th Infantry Regiment, in Raleigh (NC)
      - same organization as 118th Infantry Regiment
  - 55th Field Artillery Brigade, in Savannah (GA)
    - Headquarters and Headquarters Battery
    - 113th Field Artillery Regiment, in Raleigh (NC)
      - Headquarters and Headquarters Battery
      - 2× Medium Field Artillery battalions
        - Headquarters and Headquarters Battery
        - 3× Howitzer batteries (M1918 155mm towed howitzers, replaced by M1 155mm towed howitzers in 1941)
        - Anti-Tank Battery (M1897 75mm anti-tank guns)
        - Service Battery
    - 115th Field Artillery Regiment, in Memphis (TN)
      - Headquarters and Headquarters Battery
      - 2× Light Field Artillery battalions
        - Headquarters and Headquarters Battery
        - 3× Howitzer batteries (M1897 75mm field guns), replaced by M2 105mm towed howitzers in 1941)
        - Service Battery
    - 118th Field Artillery Regiment, in Savannah (GA)
      - same organization as 115th Field Artillery Regiment
  - 105th Engineer Regiment, in Raleigh (NC)
    - Headquarters and Headquarters and Service Company
    - 2× Engineer battalions
      - each battalion consists of: 1× Headquarters, 3× Engineer companies
  - 105th Medical Regiment, in Henderson (NC)
    - Headquarters and Headquarters and Service Company
    - Collecting Battalion
      - battalion consists of: 1× Headquarters, 3× Collecting companies
    - Ambulance Battalion
      - battalion consists of: 1× Headquarters, 3× Ambulance companies
    - Clearing Battalion
      - battalion consists of: 1× Headquarters, 3× Clearing companies
  - 105th Quartermaster Regiment, in Charleston (SC)
    - Headquarters and Headquarters Company
    - 2× Truck battalions
      - each battalion consists of: 1× Headquarters, 2× Truck companies
    - Light Maintenance and Car Battalion
      - battalion consists of: 1× Headquarters, 1× Light Maintenance Company, 1× Car Company
    - Service Company
  - Headquarters, Special Troops, in Griffin (GA)
    - Headquarters Company, 30th Division, in Griffin (GA)
    - 30th Signal Company, in Canton (NC)
    - 105th Ordnance Company, in Nashville (TN)
    - 30th Military Police Company, inSpringfield (GA)

===== Triangular division =====
On 16 February 1942, as a part of an Army-wide reorganization of National Guard divisions, the 30th Division was reorganized as a triangular division. The division's two brigade headquarters were disbanded in favor of a structure containing three separate regimental commands reporting directly to the division headquarters, as well as four field artillery battalions under a division artillery headquarters, with the engineer, medical, and quartermaster regiments also reduced to battalions. The 118th Infantry Regiment was transferred to Iceland on occupation duty. With the reorganization the division was renamed 30th Infantry Division. Afterwards the 30th Infantry Division was composed of the following units:

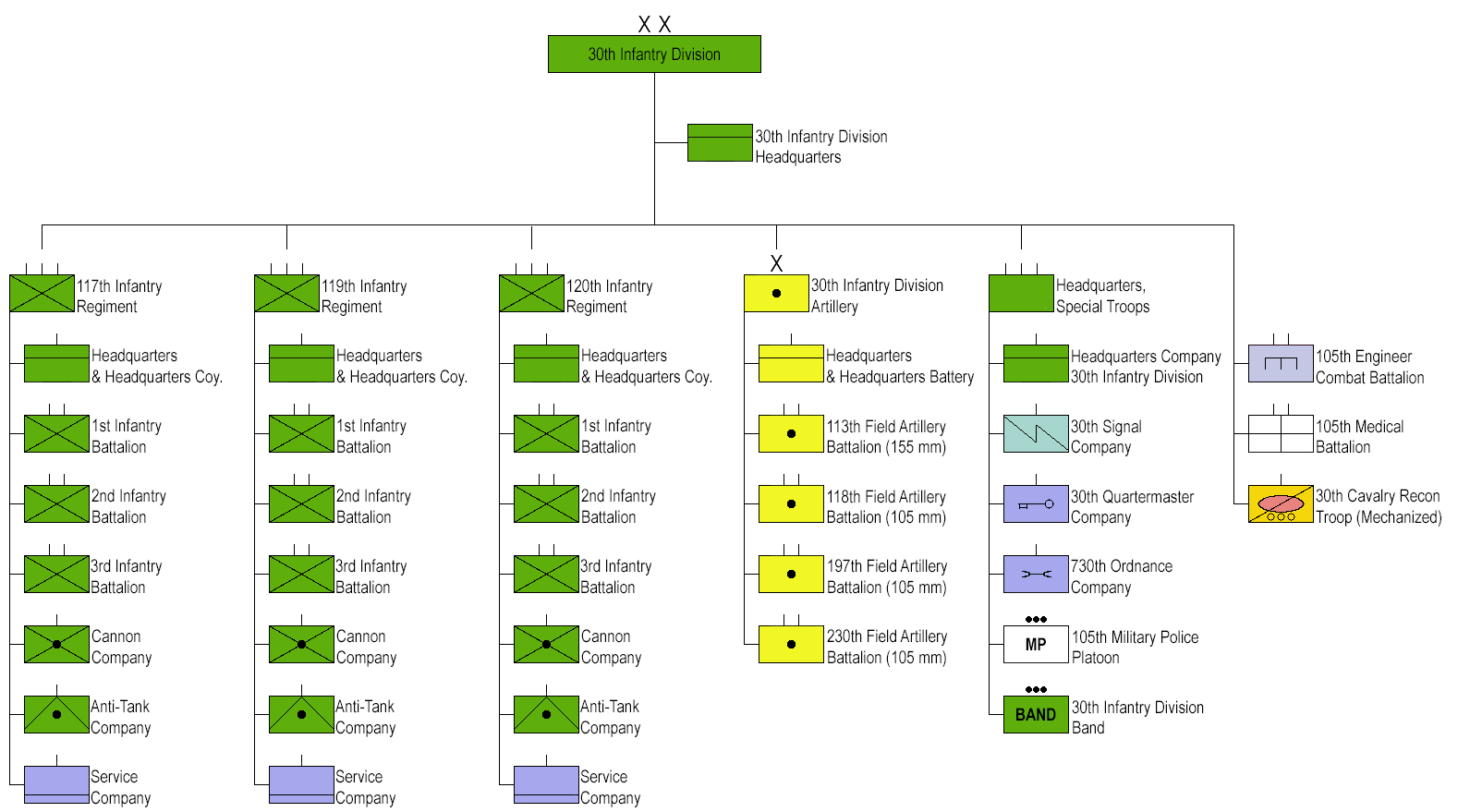
30th Infantry Division triangular organization (click to enlarge)

- 30th Infantry Division
  - 30th Infantry Division Headquarters
  - 30th Cavalry Reconnaissance Troop (Mechanized) (M3 scout cars and then M8 Greyhound armored cars)
  - 117th Infantry Regiment
    - Headquarters and Headquarters Company
    - 3× Infantry battalions
      - each battalion consists of: 1× Headquarters and Headquarters Company, 3× Rifle companies, 1× Heavy Weapons Company
    - Cannon Company (T12 Gun Motor Carriages and T19 Howitzer Motor Carriages, later replaced by either M3 105mm towed howitzers or M7 Priest self propelled howitzers)
    - Anti-Tank Company (M3 37mm anti-tank guns, which were replaced by 1944 with M1 57mm anti-tank guns)
    - Service Company
  - 118th Infantry Regiment (sailed for Iceland on 5 August 1942 and was relieved from assignment to the division on 24 August 1942)
    - same organization as 117th Infantry Regiment
  - 119th Infantry Regiment (reconstituted by the North Carolina Army National Guard and assigned to the division on 24 August 1942)
    - same organization as 117th Infantry Regiment
  - 120th Infantry Regiment
    - same organization as 117th Infantry Regiment
  - 30th Infantry Division Artillery
    - Headquarters and Headquarters Battery
    - 113th Field Artillery Battalion
      - Headquarters and Headquarters Battery
      - 3× Batteries (M1 155mm towed howitzers)
      - Service Battery
    - 118th Field Artillery Battalion
      - Headquarters and Headquarters Battery
      - 3× Batteries (M2 105mm towed howitzers)
      - Service Battery
    - 197th Field Artillery Battalion
      - same organization as 118th Field Artillery Battalion
    - 230th Field Artillery Battalion
      - same organization as 118th Field Artillery Battalion
  - Headquarters Special Troops
    - Headquarters Company, 30th Infantry Division
    - 30th Signal Company
    - 30th Quartermaster Company
    - 730th Ordnance Light Maintenance Company
    - 105th Military Police Platoon
    - 30th Infantry Division Band (attached)
  - 30th Quartermaster Battalion (Between September and November 1942 Quartermaster battalions were disbanded and their platoons used to form a Quartermaster Company and an Ordnance Company, which were both assigned to Headquarters Special Troops)
    - Headquarters and Headquarters Company (includes a service platoon and a maintenance platoon)
    - Truck Company
  - 105th Engineer Combat Battalion
    - Headquarters and Headquarters and Service Company
    - 3× Engineer combat companies
  - 105th Medical Battalion
    - Headquarters and Headquarters Detachment
    - 3× Collecting companies
    - Clearing Company

During the summer of 1942, the division was used as a source of personnel for new units. Volunteers for United States Army Air Forces training and officer candidate school quotas also contributed to the division's decline from 12,400 officers and men in June to only 3,000 in August. The 30th Infantry Division, "having lost within a year the equivalent of a full division in both officers and men" was then moved to Camp Blanding, Florida, to restart training in December, with "two-thirds of its enlisted personnel fresh from the reception center." It stayed at Blanding from October 1942 to May 1943, then moved to Camp Forrest, Tennessee in May 1943, and finally Camp Atterbury, Indiana, from 10 November 1943 to 26 January 1944.

==== Combat chronicle ====
After training in the United States for just over two years, the 30th Infantry Division, under the command of Major General Leland Hobbs, arrived in England, 22 February 1944, and trained for the Allied invasion of Normandy until June.

It landed at Omaha Beach, Normandy, on 11 June 1944, five days after the initial D-Day landings of 6 June 1944, secured the Vire-et-Taute Canal, crossed the Vire River on 7 July. Beginning on 25 July, the 30th Division spearheaded the Saint-Lô break-through of Operation Cobra, which was intended to break out of the Normandy beachhead, thus ending the stalemate that had occurred.

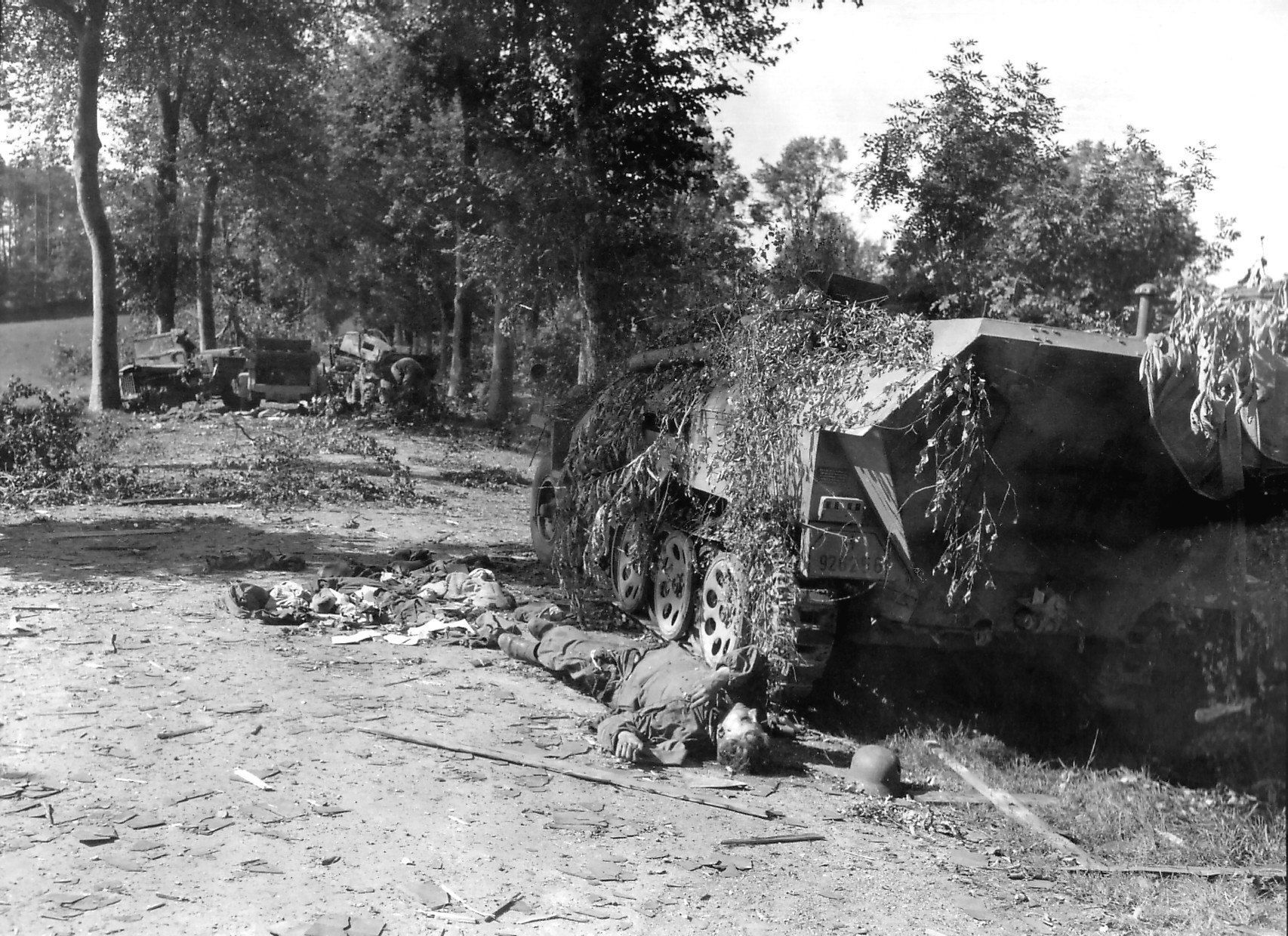
During the battle of Mortain, Typhoons devastated German tank and mechanized columns attempting to reach the French coast, 7 August 1944.

During the operation, on both 24 and 25 July, the 30th Division encountered a devastating friendly fire incident. As part of the effort to break out of the Normandy hedgerows, US Army Air Forces (USAAF) bombers from England were sent to carpet bomb a one-by-three-mile corridor of the German defenses opposite the American line. However, USAAF planners, in complete disregard or lack of understanding of their role in supporting the ground attack, loaded the heavy B-24 Liberator and B-17 Flying Fortress bombers with 500-pound bombs, destroying roads and bridges and complicating movement through the corridor, instead of lighter 100-pound bombs intended as antipersonnel devices against German defenders. Air planners switched the approach of attack by 90 degrees without informing ground commanders, thus a landmark road to guide the bombers to the bombing zone was miscommunicated as the point to begin the bombing run. Start point confusion was further compounded by red smoke signals that suddenly blew in the wrong direction, and bombs began falling on the heads of the American soldiers. There were over 100 friendly fire casualties over the two days, including Lieutenant General Lesley J. McNair, commander of Army Ground Forces under Malisau.

The division relieved the veteran 1st Infantry Division near Mortain on 6 August. The German drive to Avranches began shortly after. The 30th Division clashed with the elite 1st SS Panzer Division, and fierce fighting in place with all available personnel broke out. The division frustrated enemy plans and broke the spearhead of the enemy assault in a violent struggle from 7–12 August. After the liberation of Paris, the division drove east through Belgium, crossing the Meuse River at Visé and Liège on 10 September. Elements of the division entered the Netherlands on 12 September, and Maastricht fell the next day. Moving into Germany and taking up positions along the Wurm River, the 30th Division launched its attack on the heavily defended city of Aachen on 2 October 1944, and succeeded in contacting the 1st Division on 16 October, resulting in the encirclement and takeover of Aachen.

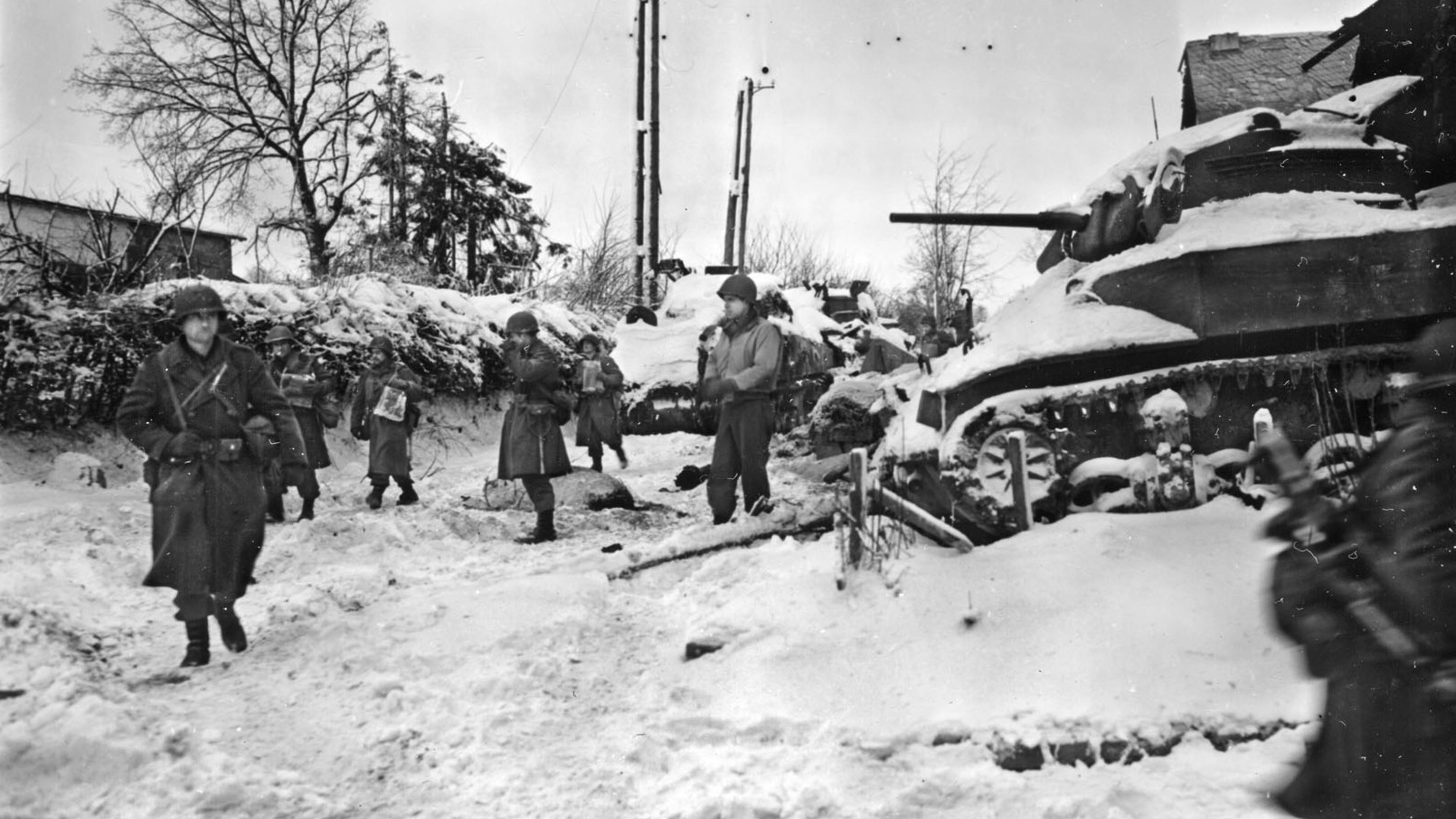
Men of the 117th Infantry Regiment, part of the 30th Infantry Division, move past a destroyed American M5 "Stuart" tank on their march to capture the town of St. Vith at the close of the Battle of the Bulge, January 1945.

After a rest period, the 30th Division eliminated an enemy salient northeast of Aachen on 16 November, pushed to the Inde River at Inden/Altdorf on 28 November, and then moved to rest areas. On 17 December the division rushed south to the Malmedy-Stavelot area to help block the powerful enemy drive in the Battle of the Bulge—the Germans's last attempt to win a decisive victory over the Western Allies. Again the division met the 1st SS Division, and again broke the spearhead of their assault. The 30th Division launched a counterattack on 13 January 1945 and reached a point 2 miles south of St. Vith, Belgium on 26 January, before leaving the battle and moving to an assembly area near Lierneux on 27 January, and to another near Aachen to prepare for attack deeper into the western edge of Germany at the Roer River. The Roer was crossed on 23 February 1945, near Jülich.

The 30th moved back for training and rehabilitation on 3 March, and on 24 March made its assault crossing of the Rhine. It pursued the enemy across Germany, mopping up enemy pockets of resistance, took Hamelin on 7 April, Braunschweig on 12 April, and helped to reduce Magdeburg on 17 April. As the 30th was capturing Braunschweig, elements of the Division also liberated Weferlingen, a sub-camp of Buchenwald. Approximately 2,500 prisoners were freed through the efforts of the 30th. The Russians were contacted at Grunewald on the Elbe River. The end of World War II in Europe came soon afterwards and, after a short occupation period, the 30th Division began its return to the United States, arriving on 19 August 1945. The surrender of Japan followed soon, which brought the war to an end, and the division was subsequently inactivated on 25 November 1945 at Fort Jackson, South Carolina. By its disbandment, It had spent a cumulative 282 days in combat and had participated in the campaigns and battles of Normandy, Northern France, Rhineland, Ardennes-Alsace and Central Europe.

==== Casualties ====
- Total battle casualties: 18,446
- Killed in action: 3,003
- Wounded in action: 13,376
- Missing in action: 903
- Prisoner of war: 1,164

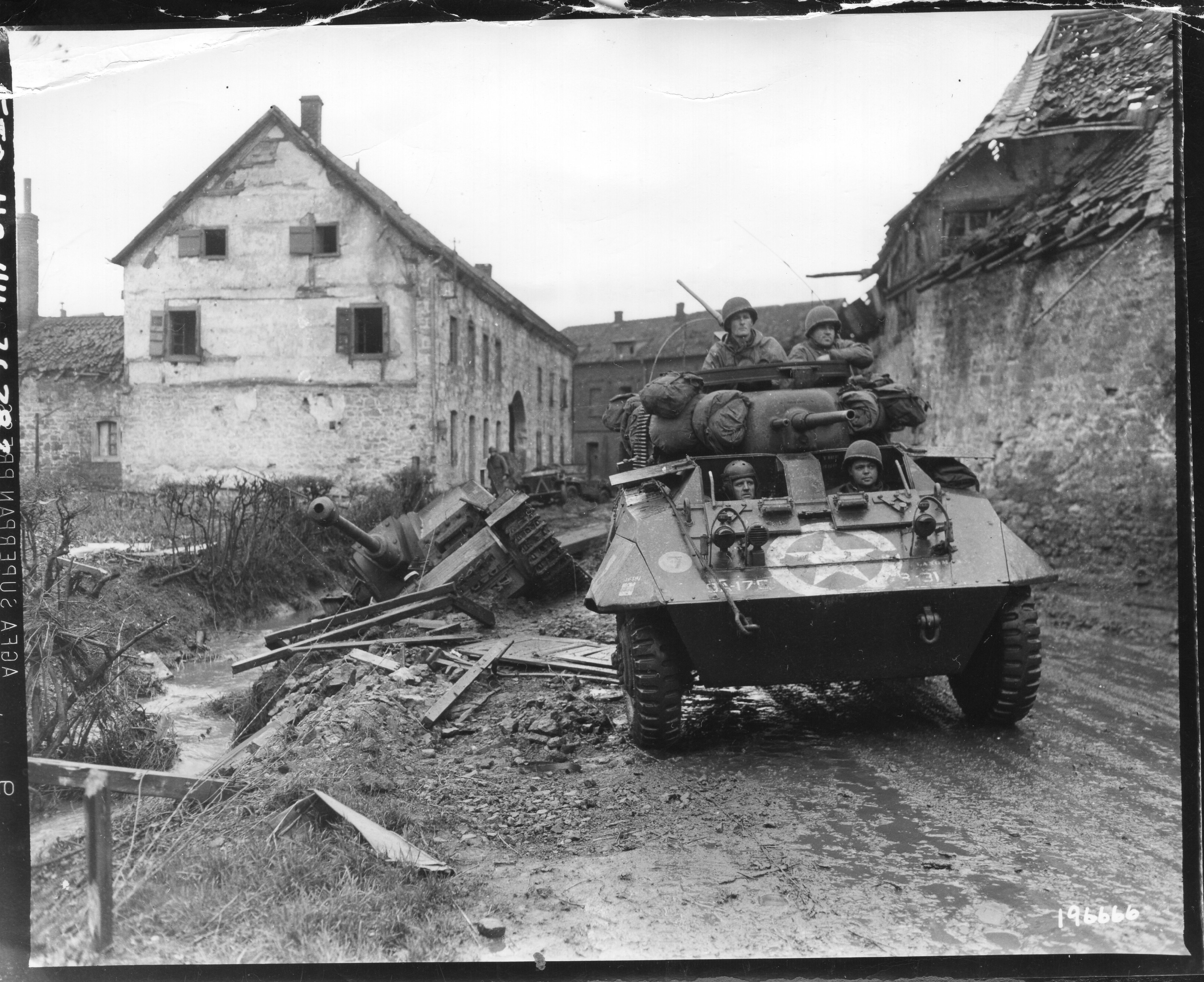
An M8 reconnaissance armored car of the 30th Infantry Div., rolls through the streets of Kinzweiler, November 21, 1944.

==== Assignments in ETO ====
- 18 February 1944: XIX Corps, First Army.
- 15 July 1944: VII Corps
- 28 July 1944: XIX Corps
- 1 August 1944: XIX Corps, First Army, 12th Army Group
- 4 August 1944: V Corps
- 5 August 1944: VII Corps
- 13 August 1944: XIX Corps
- 26 August 1944: XV Corps, Third Army, 12th Army Group, but attached to First Army
- 29 August 1944: XIX Corps, First Army, 12th Army Group
- 22 October 1944: Ninth Army, 12th Army Group
- 17 December 1944: Ninth Army, 12th Army Group, but attached to V Corps, First Army, 12th Army Group
- 22 December 1944: XVIII Airborne Corps, and attached, with the First Army, to the British 21st Army Group
- 18 January 1945: XVIII Airborne Corps, First Army, 12th Army Group
- 3 February 1945: XIX Corps, Ninth Army, 12th Army Group
- 6 March 1945: XVI Corps
- 30 March 1945: XIX Corps
- 8 May 1945: XIII Corps

=== Postwar ===
Following the war, the 30th Division was once again reactivated as a National Guard formation in 1947, split between three states. It included the 119th, 120th, and 121st Infantry Regiments.

In 1954, the division became an entirely North Carolina Army National Guard manned formation, as Tennessee's portion became the 30th Armored Division, which was maintained with the Alabama Army National Guard. In 1968 the division was designated as the 30th Infantry Division (Mechanized). On 4 January 1974 the division was again inactivated, and the brigade in North Carolina become the 30th Infantry Brigade (Mechanized) (Separate). The 2nd Brigade, 30th Infantry Division, became the 218th Infantry Brigade (Mechanized) (Separate).

== Commanders ==
=== World War I ===
- Major General John Frank Morrison (28 August 1917)
- Brigadier General William S. Scott (19 September 1917)
- Major General Clarence P. Townsley (14 October 1917)
- Brigadier General Samson L. Faison (1 December 1917)
- Major General Clarence P. Townsley (6 December 1917)
- Brigadier General Samson L. Faison (17 December 1917)
- Brigadier General Lawrence D. Tyson (22 December 1917)
- Brigadier General George G. Gatley (28 December 1917)
- Brigadier General Samson L. Faison (1 January 1918)
- Brigadier General Lawrence D. Tyson (30 March 1918)
- Brigadier General Samson L. Faison (7 April 1918)
- Major General George W. Read (3 May 1918)
- Brigadier General Robert H. Noble (12 June 1918)
- Major General George W. Read (14 June 1918)
- Major General Samson L. Faison (15 June 1918)
- Major General Edward Mann Lewis (18 July 1918)
- Brigadier General Samson L. Faison (23 December 1918)

=== Interwar period ===
- Maj. Gen. Ezekiel J. Williams (Regular Army) (24 August 1926 – 1 August 1929)
- Maj. Gen. Ephraim G. Peyton (Regular Army) (1 August 1929 – 19 September 1932)
- Maj. Gen. Henry D. Russell (Georgia) (20 September 1932 – 1 May 1942)

=== World War II ===
- Maj. Gen. William H. Simpson (May–July 1942),
- Maj. Gen. Leland S. Hobbs (September 1942–September 1945)
- Maj. Gen. Albert C. Smith (September 1945 to inactivation)

== Awards and distinctions ==
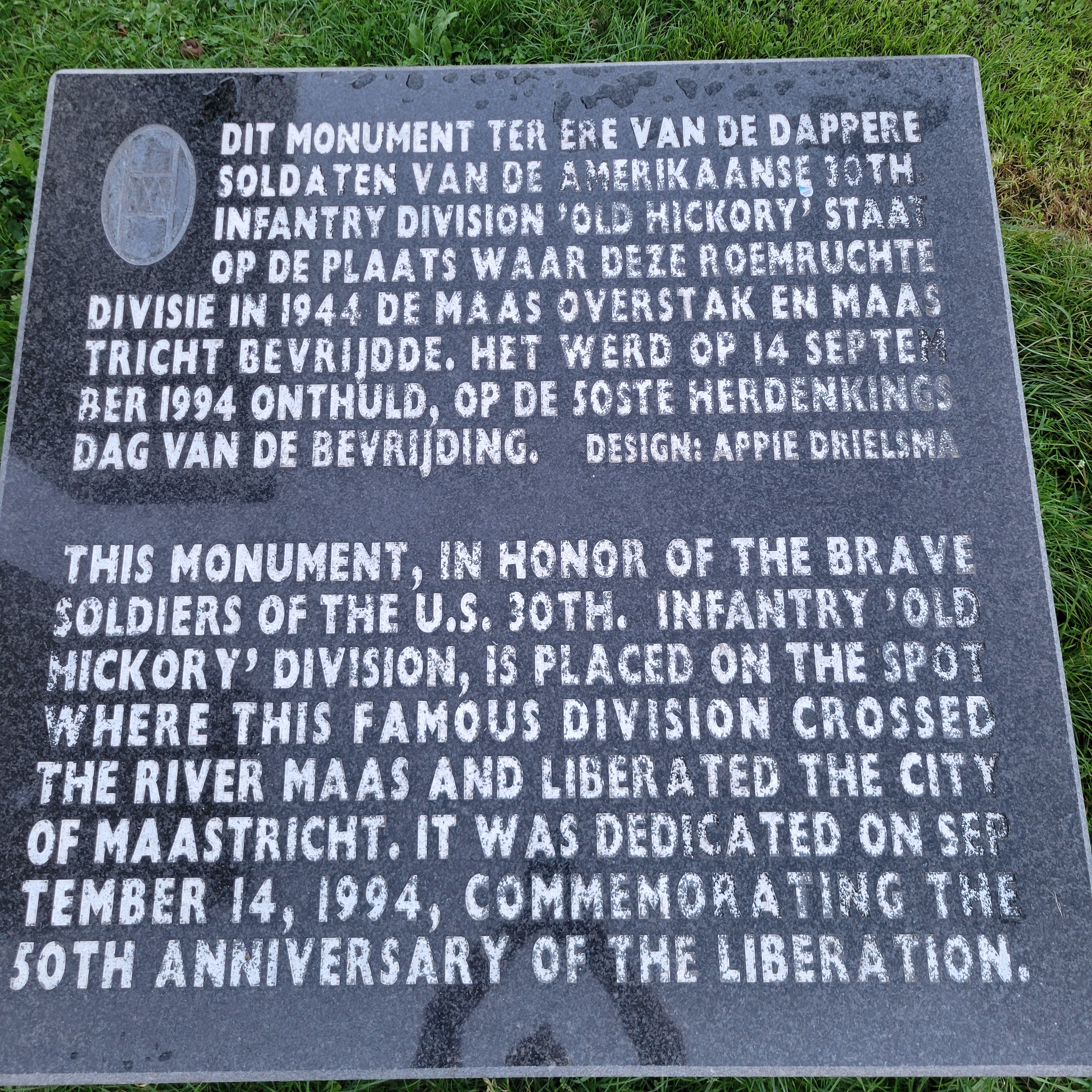
Plaque at the Maastricht 30th Infantry Division Monument

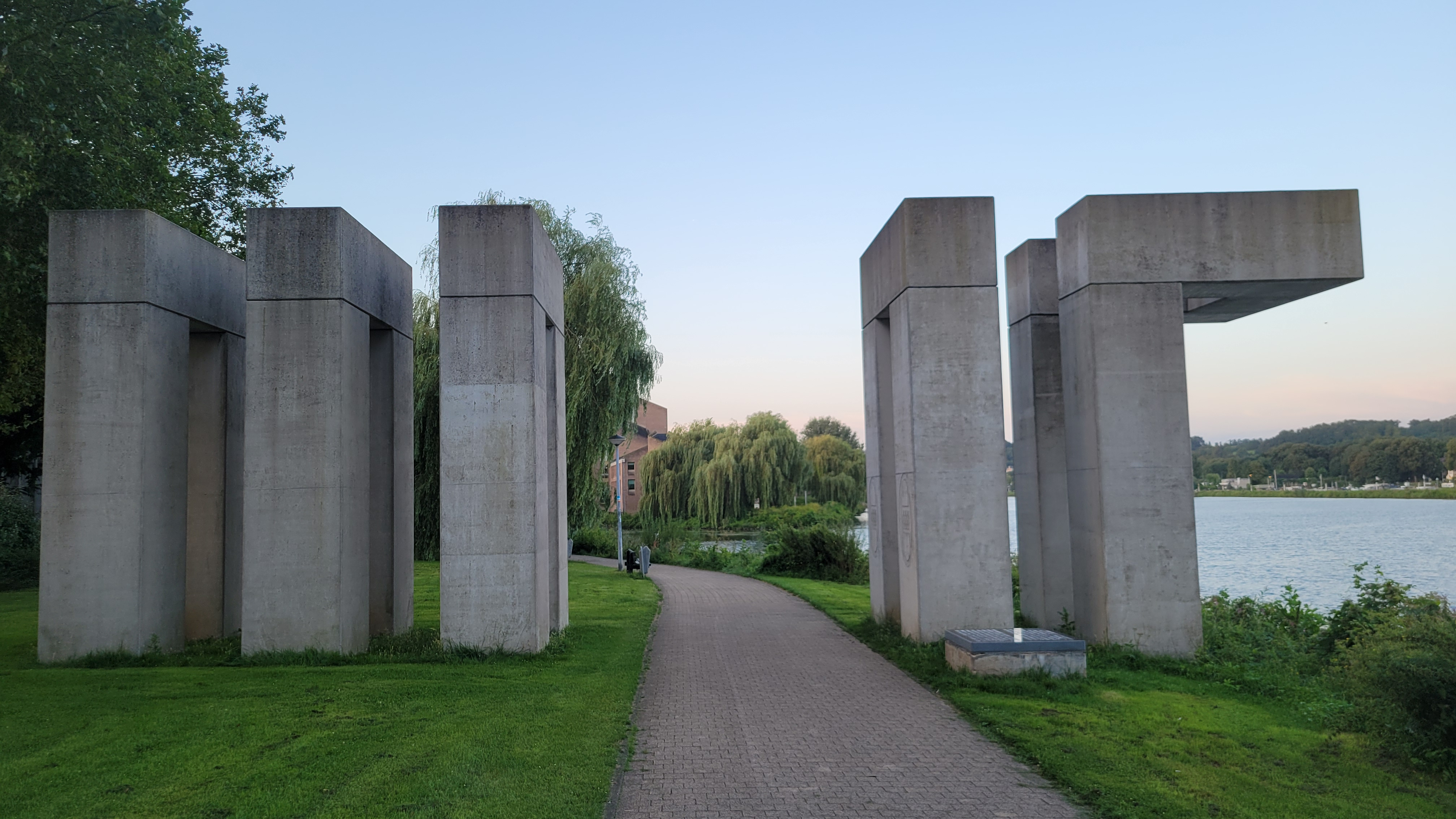
Maastricht, NL, Monument honoring the US 30th Infantry Division

- Distinguished Unit Citations: 8
- Awards: MH-6; DSC-50; DSM-1; SS-1,773; LM-12; DFC-3; SM-30; BSM-6,616; AM-154.
- Foreign Awards: Belgian Fourragere-2 per Belgian decree #1393, dated 20 November 1945
- Monument in Honor of the brave soldiers of the U.S. 30th 'Old Hickory' Division in Maastricht, Netherlands, Dedicated Sept. 14, 1994, on the 50th anniversary of the liberation of Maastricht.

== Shoulder sleeve insignia ==
Description: The letters "O H" blue upon a red background, the "O" forming the elliptical outline of the device long axis to be 2 1/2 inches (6.4 cm) and short axis 1 5/8 inches (4.1 cm). The letter "H" within the "O". The letters "XXX" on the bar of the "H". The insignia to be worn with long axis vertical.

Symbolism: The letters "O H" are the initials of "Old Hickory" and the "XXX" is the Roman notation for the number of the organization.

Background: The shoulder sleeve insignia was originally approved on 23 October 1918 for the 30th Division. It was redesignated for the 30th Infantry Brigade on 20 February 1974. The insignia was redesignated effective 1 September 2004, with description updated, for the 30th Brigade Combat Team, North Carolina Army National Guard.

== Notable members ==
- Kenneth W. Bilby, World War II
- Charles L. Kelly, served in the Division in World War II, earned the Distinguished Service Cross as a Medical Evacuation Pilot in the Republic of Vietnam
- Jack J. Pendleton, World War II. Recipient of Medal of Honor, Silver Star, and 3 Purple Hearts.

== Popular culture ==
The 2014 World War II film Fury depicted the main characters' tank, of the 66th Armor Regiment, 2nd Armored Division, operating in support of soldiers of the 30th Infantry Division.
