= Tyree R. Rivers =

United States Army general (1862–1923)

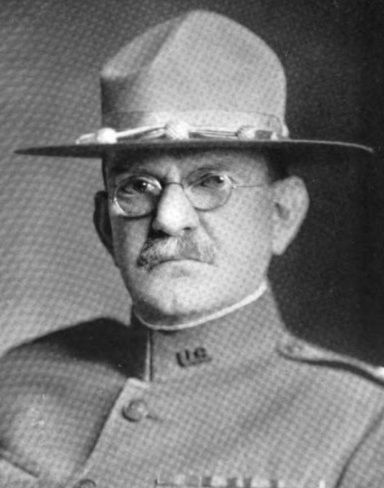
- From 1923's Fifty-fourth Annual Report of the Association of Graduates of the United States Military Academy
- Born: May 10, 1862; Tunica County, Mississippi, US
- Died: January 23, 1923 (aged 60); Governors Island, New York, US
- Burial place: Arlington National Cemetery
- Alma mater: United States Military Academy; United States Army War College
- Spouse: Katharine Fenlon (m. 1894–1923)
- Children: 1
- Relatives: William C. Rivers (brother); Tiemann Newell Horn (brother-in-law)
- Military career
- Service: United States Army
- Service years: 1883–1923
- Rank: Brigadier General
- Service number: 0–137
- Unit: U.S. Army Cavalry Branch
- Commands: Camp Peña Colorado, Texas; Troop F, 4th Cavalry Regiment; 2nd Squadron, 4th Cavalry Regiment; 13th Cavalry Regiment; Western Texas Cavalry Patrol District; Fort Riley, Kansas; Officers' Training Camp, Fort Riley; 20th Cavalry Regiment; 78th Field Artillery Regiment; 158th Depot Brigade; Camp Sherman; 154th Depot Brigade
- Conflicts: American Indian Wars; Garza Revolution; Spanish–American War; Philippine–American War; Moro Rebellion; Mexican Border War; Pancho Villa Expedition; World War I
- Awards: Silver Star

Tyree Rodes Rivers (10 May 1862 – 23 January 1923) was a career officer in the United States Army. A veteran of nearly every U.S. Army action from the American Indian Wars to World War I, he served from 1883 until his death and attained the rank of brigadier general. Rivers's Spanish–American War heroism was recognized in 1924 when he was posthumously awarded the Citation Star for gallantry at the Battle of Las Guasimas. The Silver Star medal was created in 1932, and Citation Stars were converted to the new award.

A native of Tunica County, Mississippi, Rivers was raised and educated in Giles County, Tennessee. In 1879, he began attendance at the United States Military Academy; he graduated in 1883 and was commissioned as a second lieutenant of Cavalry. His initial assignments with the 3rd Cavalry Regiment included postings to Arizona, Texas, and Indian Territory during the American Indian Wars, and participation in the U.S. response to the Garza Revolution. During the Spanish–American War, he served in Cuba as an aide-de-camp to Major General Samuel B. M. Young, and during the Philippine–American War he took part in combat as a member of the 4th Cavalry Regiment.

Rivers participated in patrols of the U.S. border in Texas during the Mexican Border War and took part in the 1916 Pancho Villa Expedition. During World War I, Rivers commanded the 20th Cavalry Regiment, which was later reorganized as the 78th Field Artillery Regiment. After receiving promotion to temporary brigadier general, he commanded the 158th Depot Brigade and Camp Sherman, Ohio, then the 154th Depot Brigade at Fort Meade, Maryland. After the war, he reverted to his permanent rank of colonel and served as inspector general of the Second Corps Area. Rivers was still on duty when he died at Governors Island, New York on 23 January 1923. He was buried at Arlington National Cemetery. In 1930, the US Congress enacted a law permitting the general officers of World War I to retire at their highest rank, and Rivers was posthumously promoted to brigadier general on the retired list.

== Early life ==
Tyree Rodes Rivers was born in Tunica County, Mississippi on 10 May 1862, a son of William Rivers and Julia (Flournoy) Rivers. His siblings included William, a career United States Army officer who attained the rank of major general, and Myra, the wife of Brigadier General Tiemann Newell Horn. Rivers was raised and educated in Giles County, Tennessee, and prepared for the United States Military Academy entrance exam under the tutelage of Charles Geddings Rogers, an 1854 graduate who served in the Confederate States Army during the American Civil War. In 1879, Rivers received an appointment to West Point from Congressman Washington C. Whitthorne.

Rivers graduated in 1883 ranked 31st of 52; His classmates who also became general officers included: William Campbell Langfitt; John Wilson Ruckman; Ira Allen Haynes; Chase Wilmot Kennedy; Charles Gould Morton; Isaac Littell; George H. Cameron; John W. Heard; Harry Clay Hale; Robert D. Walsh; George Windle Read; Samson L. Faison; Omar Bundy; Lawrence Tyson; and Clarence Ransom Edwards. Among his prominent classmates who did not attain general officer's rank were Thomas Ridgway and Herbert H. Sargent.

== Start of career ==
Rivers received his commission as a second lieutenant of Cavalry in June 1883. He was assigned to the 3rd Cavalry Regiment, and performed duty at posts including Whipple Barracks (Arizona), Fort Davis, (Texas), and Fort Sill (Indian Territory). His duties in the American Southwest included scouting and patrols in Arizona during the Geronimo campaign of the American Indian Wars and garrison duty at posts near the lands of the Cheyenne and Arapaho Tribes in Indian Territory (present-day Oklahoma). Rivers was assigned to temporary recruiting duty at Jefferson Barracks, Missouri from September 1887 to February 1888. He served at Fort McIntosh, Texas from February 1888 to March 1889, and at Fort Clark, Texas from March to October 1889. He was assigned to Camp Peña Colorado, Texas in October 1889 to June 1893, and took part in the U.S. response to the Garza Revolution's efforts to conduct activities against the Mexican government from the U.S. side of the border. He was promoted to first lieutenant in January 1889, and appointed to command Camp Peña Colorada and the Cavalry detachment stationed there.

In June 1893, Rivers was posted to Fort Riley, Kansas, where his additional duties included recorder for the Board on Revision of Cavalry Drill Regulations (May 1894 to March 1895) and secretary of the Cavalry and Light Artillery School (November 1894 to August 1895). He was the 3rd Cavalry's regimental quartermaster at Jefferson Barracks from August 1895 to June 1897 and regimental adjutant at Fort Ethan Allen, Vermont from June 1897 to April 1898. During the Spanish–American War, Rivers served as regimental adjutant during the regiment's organization and training at Camp George H. Thomas, Georgia from April 23 to May 12, 1898. He was then assigned as aide-de-camp to Major General Samuel B. M. Young, who commanded during combat in Cuba the Cavalry Division that was part of the Fifth Army Corps. After returning to the United States in August 1898, Rivers joined the Second Army Corps as it prepared for Philippines service at posts including Camp George Meade, Pennsylvania and Camp MacKenzie near Augusta, Georgia. He was promoted to captain in October 1898 and assigned to command Troop F, 4th Cavalry Regiment.

=== Family ===
In September 1894, Rivers married Katherine Fenlon. They were married until his death and were the parents of a daughter, Myra. Katherine Fenlon was the first cousin of Harriet Fenlon, who was married to Brigadier General William Jones Nicholson.

== Continued career ==
Rivers performed Philippine–American War duty with the 4th Cavalry Regiment in the Philippines from July 1899 to June 1901, including command of the regiment's 2nd Squadron. From November 1901 to October 1904 he served at Fort Leavenworth, Kansas. He was then assigned to the Presidio of San Francisco, where he served from October 1904 to September 1905. Posted again to the Philippines, he served during the Moro Rebellion. In March 1906, Rivers was wounded in combat during the First Battle of Bud Dajo. He attended the United States Army War College from November 1906 to December 1907 and was promoted to major in April 1907.

From January 1908 to June 1909, Rivers served with the 4th Cavalry at Fort Snelling, Minnesota. He was then detailed to duty with the U.S. Army Inspector General, and he served in San Antonio, Texas as inspector general of the army's Southern Department from July 1909 to March 1910. He served again in the Philippines, this time from April 1910 to March 1913. He was promoted to lieutenant colonel in the 13th Cavalry Regiment in August 1912. From April to October 1913, Rivers assisted in the conduct of a Cavalry camp of instruction near Winchester, Virginia. From October to December 1913, Rivers was a student in the field grade officers' course at Fort Riley's Mounted Service School.

== Later career ==
From December 1913 to September 1915, Rivers served with the 13th Cavalry in Columbus, New Mexico as it carried out security duties during the Mexican Border War. He commanded the Western Texas Cavalry Patrol District from September 1915 to March 1916. From March to April 1916, he served in Mexico during the Pancho Villa Expedition. Rivers was on sick leave from April to July 1916. He was promoted to colonel in July 1916 and assigned to command the post at Fort Riley.

With the army expanding for U.S. entry into World War I, from May to August 1917 Rivers commanded the Officers' Training Camp at Fort Riley. Rivers assumed command of the 20th Cavalry Regiment in November 1917. When Army planners determined that Cavalry would not be needed during combat in France, Cavalry regiments were organized as Field Artillery. The 20th Cavalry became the 78th Field Artillery Regiment, and Rivers remained in command. He led the regiment during organization and training at Camp Logan, Texas and Camp Doniphan, Oklahoma. In June 1918, he was assigned to command the 158th Depot Brigade and Camp Sherman, Ohio. He remained in command until 30 October and was promoted to temporary brigadier general on 1 October. On 31 October, Rivers was assigned to command the 154th Depot Brigade at Camp Meade, Maryland. (Note: Depot brigades located at several posts throughout the United States were responsible during the war for receiving, equipping, and training recruits prior to their departure for the front lines. After the war, depot brigades carried out demobilization activities for returning soldiers prior to discharging them.) He remained in this position after the Armistice of November 11, 1918 ended the war.

In March 1919, he reverted to his permanent colonel's rank and was assigned as executive officer in the Office of the Inspector General of the United States Army. In June 1921, Rivers was assigned as inspector general of the Second Corps Area, with duty at Fort Jay on Governors Island, New York. He became ill in late 1922 and died at Governors Island on 23 January 1923. Rivers was buried at Arlington National Cemetery. In 1924, several officers were recognized for heroism during the Spanish–American War, including Rivers, who was cited for gallantry at the Battle of Las Guasimas. He received the Citation Star, which was presented to his wife. In 1932, the army created the Silver Star as a valor award, and Citation Stars were converted to the new medal.

== Dates of rank ==
Rivers's dates of rank were:

- Second Lieutenant, 13 June 1883
- First Lieutenant, 17 January 1889
- Captain, 16 October 1898
- Major, 18 April 1907
- Lieutenant Colonel, 24 August 1912
- Colonel, 1 July 1916
- Brigadier General (temporary), 1 October 1918
- Colonel, 10 March 1919
- Brigadier General (posthumous), 21 January 1923
