= George H. Cameron =

United States Army general (1861–1944)

George Hamilton Cameron
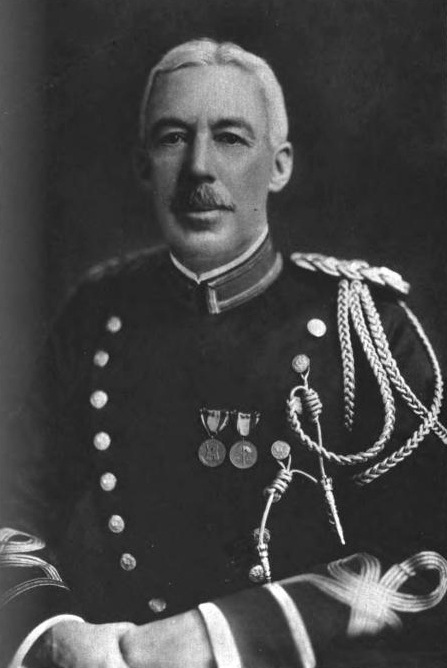
- George H. Cameron, pictured here as a major general, in October 1918.
- Born: January 8, 1861; Ottawa, Illinois, United States
- Died: January 28, 1944 (aged 83); Staunton, Virginia, United States
- Burial place: Arlington National Cemetery, Virginia, United States
- Relatives: Nina Dean Tilford (1864–1960) (wife); Douglass Tilford Cameron (1894–1918) (son); Nina (1896–1965) (daughter); Margaret (1898–1984) (daughter)
- Military career
- Allegiance: United States
- Branch: United States Army
- Service years: 1883–1924
- Rank: Major General
- Unit: Cavalry Branch
- Commands: Big Bend District, Texas; United States Army War College; Maneuver Center, Fort Benjamin Harrison; 5th Cavalry Regiment; 3rd Cavalry Brigade; 25th Cavalry Regiment; 78th Brigade; 80th Brigade; 4th Division; V Corps; Camp Gordon, Georgia; United States Army Cavalry School
- Conflicts: American Indian Wars; Spanish–American War; Philippine–American War; World War I
- Awards: British Order of the Bath; French Croix de Guerre; French Legion of Honor

Major General George Hamilton Cameron (January 8, 1861 – January 28, 1944) was a United States Army officer who had a military career spanning over forty years, at the end of which he attained the rank of major general. Despite serving in numerous conflicts, perhaps his most notable service came in the final years of World War I, where he served as the first commander of the 4th Division, which he later commanded on the Western Front in mid-1918, before being promoted to the command of V Corps, which he led during the short Battle of Saint-Mihiel and then in the early stages of the Meuse–Argonne offensive, the largest battle in the U.S. Army's history, before he was suddenly relieved of his command.

== Early life ==
George Hamilton Cameron was born in Ottawa, Illinois on January 8, 1861. He attended Northwestern University, where he joined the Phi Kappa Sigma fraternity. In 1879 he began his military career with his attendance at the United States Military Academy (USMA) at West Point, New York. His classmates there included future generals such as Clarence Ransom Edwards, Chase Wilmot Kennedy and Omar Bundy, Lawrence Tyson, Charles Gould Morton, Harry Clay Hale, Samson L. Faison, John William Heard, George Windle Read, Ira Allen Haynes, John Wilson Ruckman, Tyree R. Rivers, Robert D. Walsh, Isaac Littell, William Campbell Langfitt. Cameron graduated in 1883 with a commission as a second lieutenant of Cavalry.

== Start of military career ==
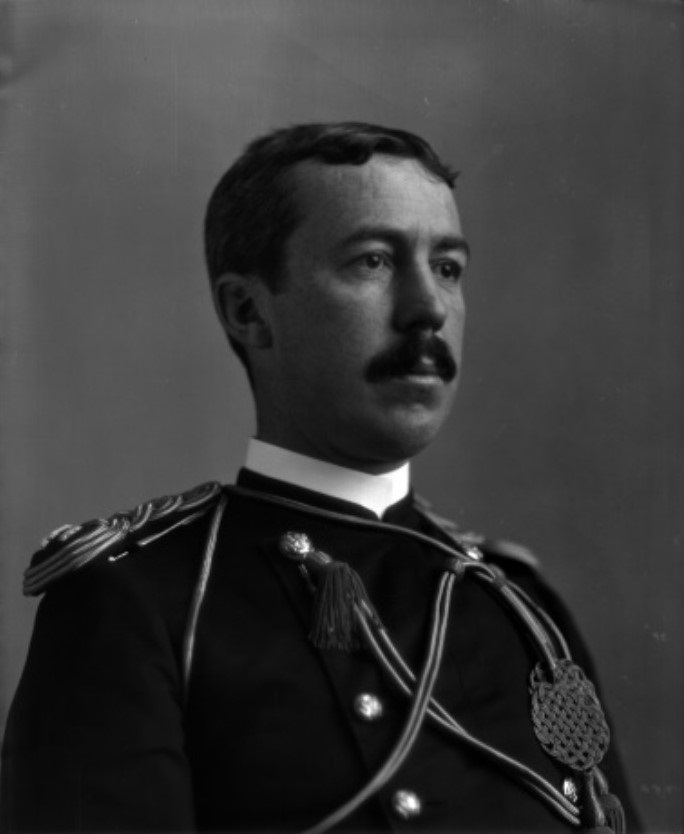
Cameron as a first lieutenant.

Cameron's early assignments during the American Indian Wars were with the 7th Cavalry Regiment (1883 to 1891), including postings to Fort Meade, South Dakota. His subsequent assignments included the 4th Cavalry Regiment (1891 to 1895). While assigned to the 7th and 4th Cavalry, Cameron was also an instructor at the U.S. Military Academy (1888 to 1895).

From 1895 to 1898 he served with the 4th Cavalry at Fort Walla Walla, including assignment as the regimental quartermaster.

Cameron served on Luzon in the Philippines during the Spanish–American War, commanding A Troop, 4th Cavalry.

He was Secretary of the Cavalry and Field Artillery School of Application at Fort Riley from 1901 to 1906, and Assistant Commandant of the Mounted Service School at Fort Riley from 1907 to 1910.

He served with the 14th Cavalry Regiment in the Philippines from 1910 to 1912, and commanded the Big Bend District in Texas in 1913, during the events which led to the Pancho Villa Expedition.

In 1913 he completed the Field Officers' Course. He was a student at the Army War College from 1913 to 1914, and was the Director of the War College from 1914 to 1916.

== World War I ==
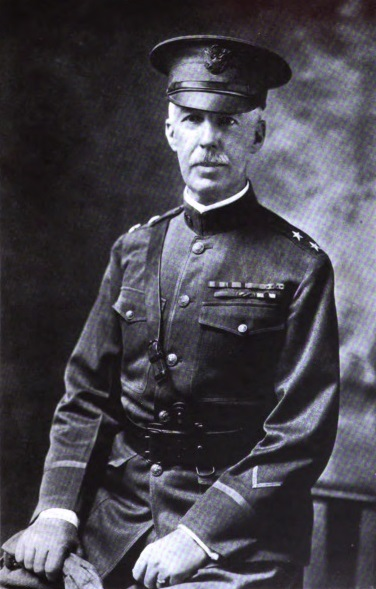
Cameron as commander of 4th Infantry Division in WW I.

Cameron was assigned to command the Maneuver Camp at Fort Benjamin Harrison at the start of U.S. preparation for entry into World War I. He subsequently organized officer training in the Army's Southern Department, and then commanded the 5th Cavalry Regiment.

In 1917 he was assigned to command of the 3rd Brigade in the Army's 15th Cavalry Division. When the plan to field Cavalry divisions was dropped in favor of creating all Infantry divisions, Cameron was assigned as commander of the 25th Cavalry Regiment.

Cameron was promoted to temporary brigadier general and briefly commanded 78th Infantry Brigade, 39th Infantry Division and 80th Brigade, 40th Infantry Division. From September to December 1917 he commanded the 40th Infantry Division.

He was promoted to temporary major general in December 1917 and assigned to command of the 4th Infantry Division. He was the division's first commander, and led it from its organization at Camp Greene, North Carolina through most of 1918, including the Saint-Mihiel Campaign and the start of the Meuse-Argonne Campaign. He is also credited with designing the division's shoulder sleeve insignia.

From August to October 1918 Cameron commanded the V Corps, and led it during the latter portion of the Meuse-Argonne campaign. He was relieved after the Battle of Montfaucon, supposedly because V Corps did not accomplish their objective on the first day of fighting, but possibly because he argued with Hugh Drum.

(John J. Pershing was attempting to simultaneously command First Army and the American Expeditionary Forces. As First Army Chief of Staff, Drum, then a colonel, was at times its de facto commander. During the Battle of Montfaucon, he pressed Cameron during a phone call, and Cameron told him "you can't talk to me like that." Cameron was of the view that Drum reported the conversation to Pershing, and that it led to Cameron's relief.)

In October 1918 he was succeeded at V Corps by Charles P. Summerall, a Pershing protégé, and returned to command of the 4th Division. Later in October Cameron was designated to return to the United States to organize and train additional units for fighting in France, but the end of the war eliminated the need for more soldiers.

== Post World War I ==
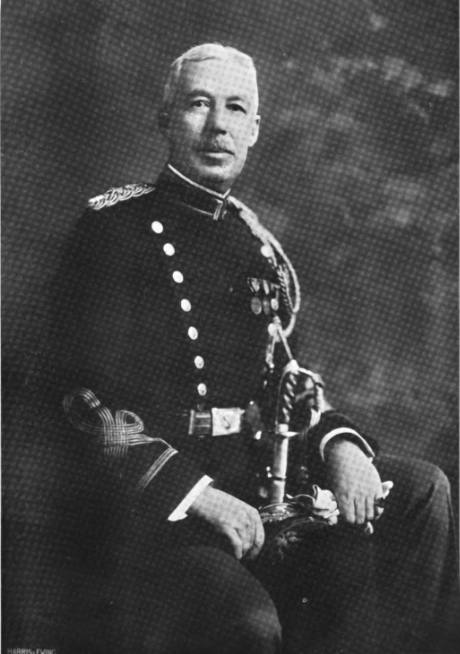
Cameron as Commandant of the Cavalry School.

After the war Cameron was assigned to command of Camp Gordon, Georgia. In 1919 he reverted to the permanent rank of colonel and was appointed to command of the Cavalry School at Fort Riley.

In 1921 Cameron was named Chief of Staff of the 76th Infantry Division, and served until his 1924 retirement.

== Awards ==
Cameron's awards and decorations included the British Order of the Bath (Companion), French Croix de Guerre, and France's Legion of Honor (Commander).

== Retirement, death and burial ==
After retiring, Cameron resided on Fishers Island, New York until moving to Staunton, Virginia late in his life.

He was promoted to major general on the retired list in 1930.

He died in Staunton on January 28, 1944. He and Nina Dean are buried at Arlington National Cemetery.

== Family ==
In 1888, Cameron married Nina Dean Tilford (1864–1960). She was the daughter of Brigadier General Joseph G. Tilford and sister of Colonel James D. Tilford Sr.

George and Nina Cameron's children included: Douglass Tilford Cameron, who was a First Lieutenant in the Army when he was killed in France during World War I; Nina (1896–1965), the wife of Brigadier General John B. Thompson (1890–1957); and Margaret (1898–1984), the wife of Colonel Buckner M. Creel (1896–1981), who served as commandant of Staunton Military Academy after retiring from the Army.

== Bibliography ==
- Davis, Henry Blaine Jr. (1998). Generals in Khaki. Raleigh, NC: Pentland Press. ISBN 1571970886. OCLC 40298151.
- Zabecki, David T.; Mastriano, Douglas V., eds. (2020). Pershing's Lieutenants: American Military Leadership in World War I. New York, NY: Osprey Publishing. ISBN 978-1-4728-3863-6.

Military offices
| Preceded by Newly activated organization | Commanding General 4th Division; 1917−1918 | Succeeded by Benjamin A. Poore |
| Preceded by William M. Wright | Commanding General V Corps; August−October 1918 | Succeeded by Charles P. Summerall |
