= Charles Gould Morton =

American Army World War I general

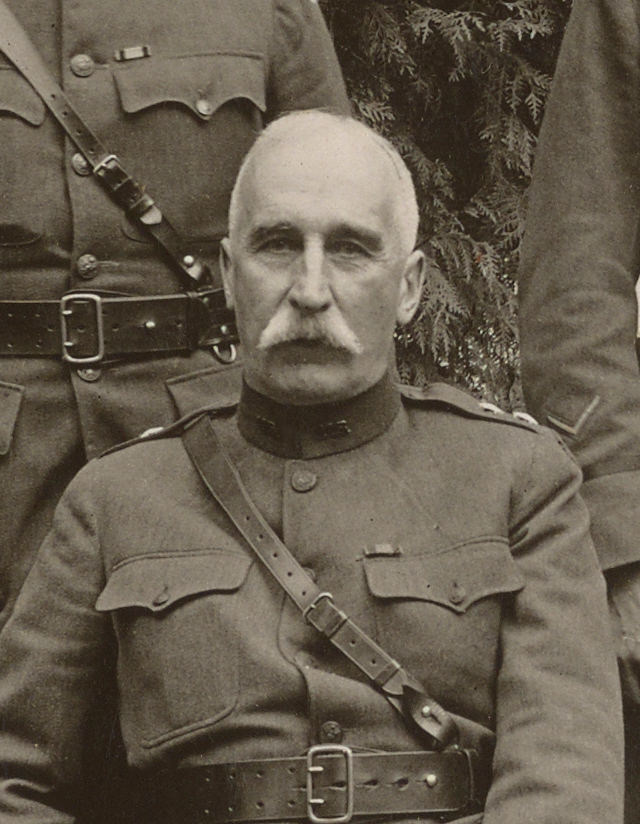
- Charles Morton, 29th Division, Nogent-le-Roi 1918
- Born: January 15, 1861; Cumberland, Maine, U.S.
- Died: July 18, 1933 (aged 72); San Francisco, California, U.S.
- Burial place: Arlington National Cemetery
- Spouse(s): Ida Hastings; Eleanor Moorhead Huff
- Military career
- Allegiance: United States
- Branch: United States Army
- Service years: 1883–1925
- Rank: Major General
- Service number: 0-5
- Commands: 29th Infantry Division
- Conflicts: Philippine–American War; World War I
- Awards: Croix de Guerre; Distinguished Service Medal; Commander of the Legion of Honor

Charles Gould Morton (January 15, 1861 – July 18, 1933) was an American major general during World War I.

== Early life ==
Charles Gould Morton was born on January 15, 1861, to Allen and Mary Morton in Cumberland, Maine. He attended the United States Military Academy (USMA) at West Point, New York, and graduated in June 1883 with the class of 1883. Several of his classmates would go on to become general officers in their careers, such as Chase W. Kennedy, George H. Cameron, Harry C. Hale, George W. Read, John W. Heard, Ira A. Haynes, Samson L. Faison, William C. Langfitt, Robert D. Walsh, Omar Bundy, Tyree R. Rivers, John W. Ruckman, Isaac Littell and Clarence R. Edwards.

== Military career ==
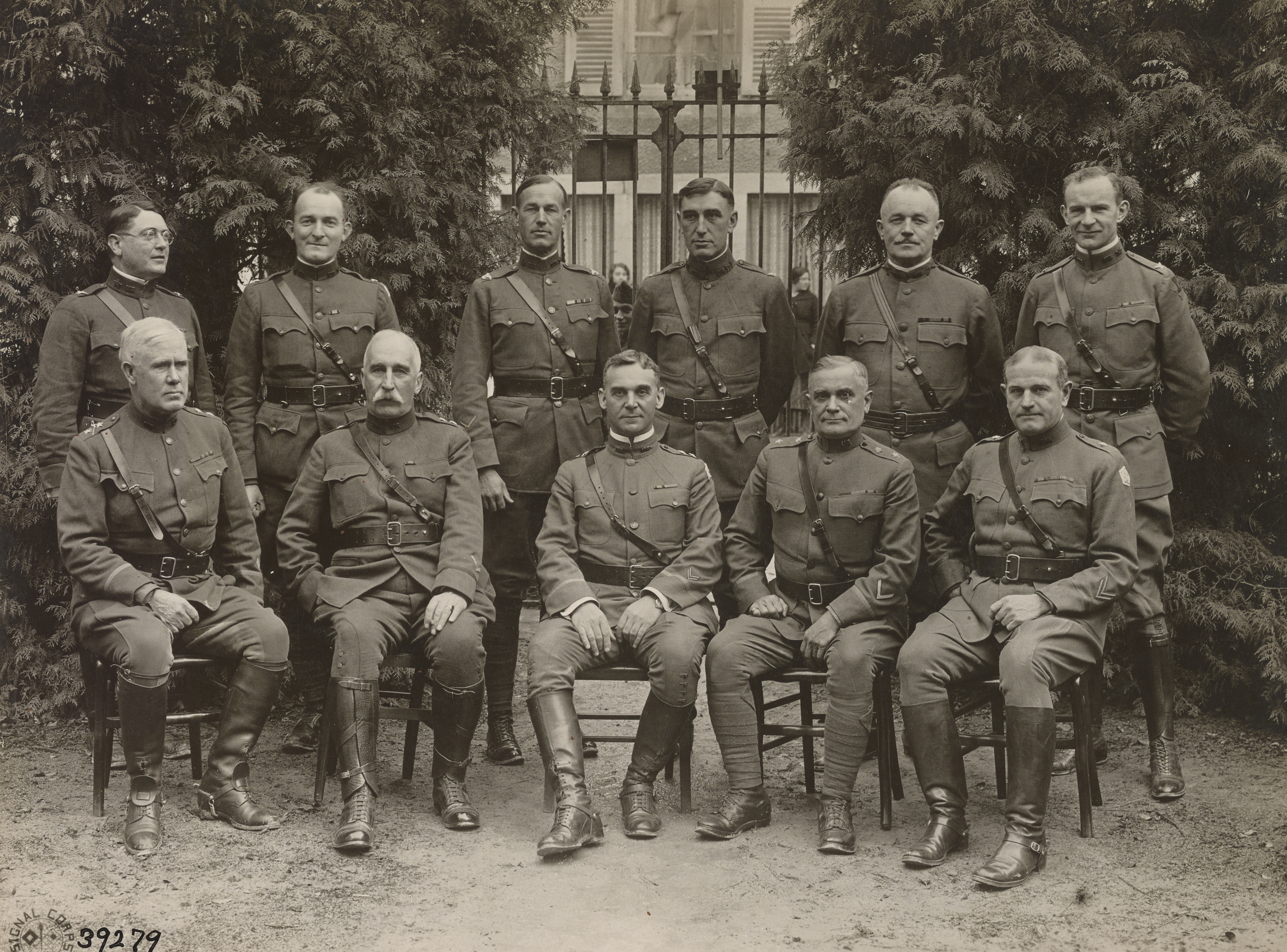
Major General Charles Pelot Summerall, sat in the middle, along with members of his staff and senior commanders in his V Corps, pictured here in 1918 or 1919. Major General Charles G. Morton, commanding the 29th Division, is sat to Summerall's right.

Morton accepted a commission as an infantry officer and served on the frontier until 1888. From 1889 to 1890, Morton was a professor of Military Science at the Florida Agricultural College.

For most of his military career, Morton served with the 6th Infantry Regiment. Morton served with the regiment in the Philippines from January 1900 to June 1902 and August 1905 to June 1907. He graduated from the United States Army War College in June 1905.

During World War I, he commanded the 29th Division.

Morton then commanded the Ninth Corps Area, which had its headquarters at the Presidio of San Francisco. He retired on January 15, 1925, upon reaching the mandatory retirement age of 64.

== Awards ==
Morton received the Army Distinguished Service Medal for his service during World War I, the citation for which reads:

The President of the United States of America, authorized by Act of Congress, July 9, 1918, takes pleasure in presenting the Army Distinguished Service Medal to Major General Charles Gould Morton, United States Army, for exceptionally meritorious and distinguished services to the Government of the United States, in a duty of great responsibility during World War I. General Morton Commanded the 29th Division from the date of its organization until the end of hostilities, and led this division with skill and ability in the successful operations east and northeast of Verdun, which forced the enemy to maintain this front with strong forces, thus preventing an increase of hostile strength between the Argonne and the Meuse.

Morton also received the Croix de Guerre with two palms and the title of Commander of the Legion of Honor.

== Personal life ==
Morton married Ida Hastings on October 15, 1885. She died in 1921, and Morton subsequently married Eleanor Moorhead Huff on June 14, 1922. He and his second wife lived in Saratoga, California, after his retirement from active duty.

== Death and legacy ==
Morton died on July 18, 1933, in San Francisco, California from a tetanus infection after suffering a burn in a firecracker accident on July 4. He was cremated and interred at Arlington National Cemetery beside his first wife and her parents on July 27, 1933.

The transport ship USS General C. G. Morton (AP-138) was named in his honor and saw service in World War II and the Korean War.

== Bibliography ==
- Cooke, James J. (1997). Pershing and his Generals: Command and Staff in the AEF. Praeger Publishers. ISBN 0-275-95363-7.
- Davis, Henry Blaine Jr. (1998). Generals in Khaki. Raleigh, North Carolina: Pentland Press. ISBN 1571970886. OCLC 40298151.
