= Ira Allen Haynes =

United States Army general

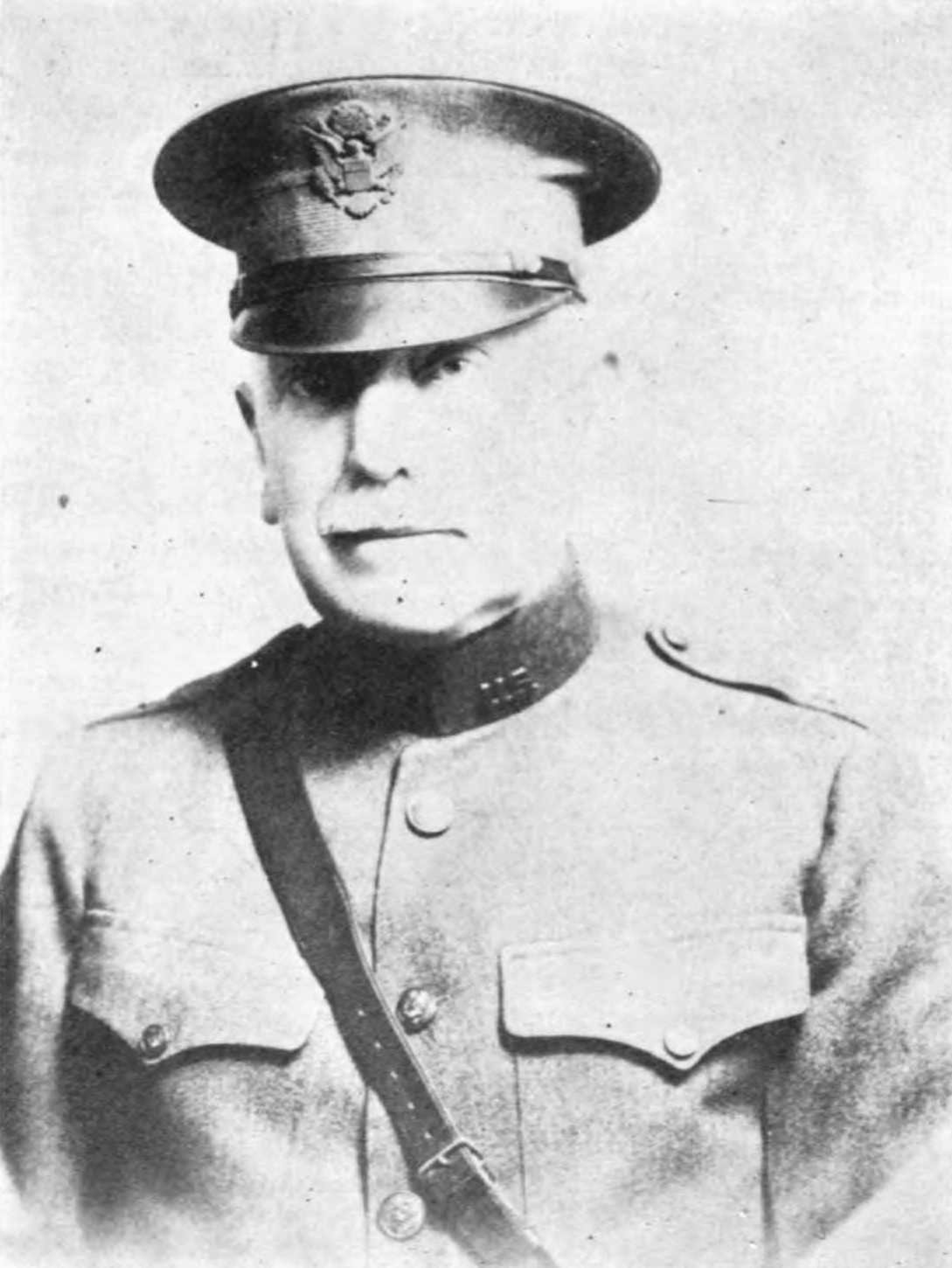
- Born: September 10, 1859; Kentucky, U.S.
- Died: February 24, 1955 (aged 95); Menlo Park, California, U.S.
- Military career
- Allegiance: United States
- Branch: United States Army
- Service years: 1883–1923
- Rank: Brigadier general
- Service number: 0-99
- Conflicts: World War I

Ira Allen Haynes (September 10, 1859 – February 24, 1955) was a United States Army officer in the late 19th and early 20th centuries. He served in World War I.

== Biography ==
Haynes was born on September 10, 1859, in Kentucky. He graduated from the United States Military Academy in 1883. Several of his classmates would go on to become general officers in their careers, such as Charles W. Kennedy, George H. Cameron, Harry C. Hale, George W. Read, John W. Heard, Omar Bundy, Samson L. Faison, William C. Langfitt, Robert D. Walsh, Omar Bundy, Charles G. Morton, Tyree R. Rivers, John W. Ruckman, Isaac Littell and Clarence R. Edwards.

Haynes was commissioned into the Third Artillery and later transferred to the Coast Artillery. In 1888, he graduated from the Artillery School, and in 1893, he served in the Virginia State Militia. Haynes was stationed at the Washington Barracks from 1893 to 1895. He served in Honolulu from 1899 to 1900, and in the Philippines from 1907 to 1909. Haynes served as the commandant of the Coast Artillery School at Fort Monroe from 1913 to 1916.

Haynes was promoted to the rank of brigadier general on August 5, 1917, and he commanded the 64th Field Artillery Brigade at Camp Beauregard. He then went to France, serving with the American Expeditionary Forces (AEF) from 1918 to April 1919. Afterward, Haynes assumed command over the Ninth Coast Artillery District in San Francisco, and his promotion to brigadier general was made permanent. He retired in 1923.

Haynes became the last survivor of his USMA class. He died in Menlo Park, California, on February 24, 1955.
