= Chase Wilmot Kennedy =

United States Army major general

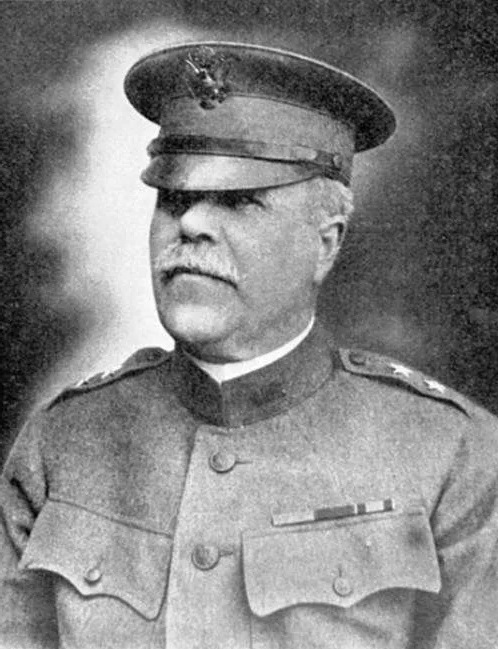
- From the 1937 annual report of the Association of Graduates of the United States Military Academy
- Born: January 4, 1859; Portsmouth, Ohio, U.S.
- Died: November 23, 1936 (aged 77); Washington, D.C., U.S.
- Burial place: Arlington National Cemetery
- Spouse: Elizabeth Lord Jewett (m. 1889-1936, his death)
- Military career
- Allegiance: United States of America
- Branch: United States Army
- Service years: 1883–1922
- Rank: Major General
- Service number: 0-44
- Unit: U.S. Army Infantry Branch
- Commands: 23rd Infantry Regiment; Camp Gettysburg; 78th Division; 85th Division; Panama Canal Department; 9th Coast Artillery District; 9th Training Center
- Conflicts: American Indian Wars; Spanish–American War; Philippine–American War; World War I

Chase Wilmot Kennedy (4 January 1859 – 23 November 1936) was a career officer in the United States Army. A veteran of the American Indian Wars, Spanish–American War, Philippine–American War, and World War I, he attained the rank of major general and was most notable for his First World War command of first the 78th Division, and later the 85th Division.

== Early years ==
Chase Wilmot Kennedy was born to Milton and Josephine Kennedy on 4 January 1859. After graduating from the public school system in 1875, Kennedy began working at the Portsmouth Tribune until 1879. He was admitted into the United States Military Academy in May 1879 and graduated eighteenth in his class in 1883. Several of his classmates would go on to become general officers in their careers, such as Omar Bundy, George H. Cameron, Harry C. Hale, George W. Read, John W. Heard, Ira A. Haynes, Samson L. Faison, William C. Langfitt, Robert D. Walsh, Lawrence Tyson, Charles G. Morton, Tyree R. Rivers, John W. Ruckman, Isaac Littell and Clarence R. Edwards.

== Military career ==
Following his graduation from the U.S.M.A., Kennedy was commissioned into the Third Infantry with which he performed frontier duty from 1883 to 1895, during which he participated in campaigns against the Kutenai, Crow and Sioux.

=== Spanish–American War ===
Still with the 3rd Infantry Regiment at the outbreak of the Spanish–American War, Kennedy saw action in Cuba and took part in the Battle of El Caney. After the Spanish defeat in 1898, Kennedy returned to the United States to take part in campaigns against the Leech Lake Indians in the fall of the same year, this time with the 8th Infantry.

Kennedy returned to Cuba in December 1898 with the 8th Infantry for the formal transfer of power on 1 January 1899. Kennedy would remain in Cuba with the provisional government until 1900 as part of the Sanitary Corps.

=== Philippine–American War ===
Kennedy and the 8th Infantry were deployed to the Philippines from 1900 to 1902.

=== First World War ===
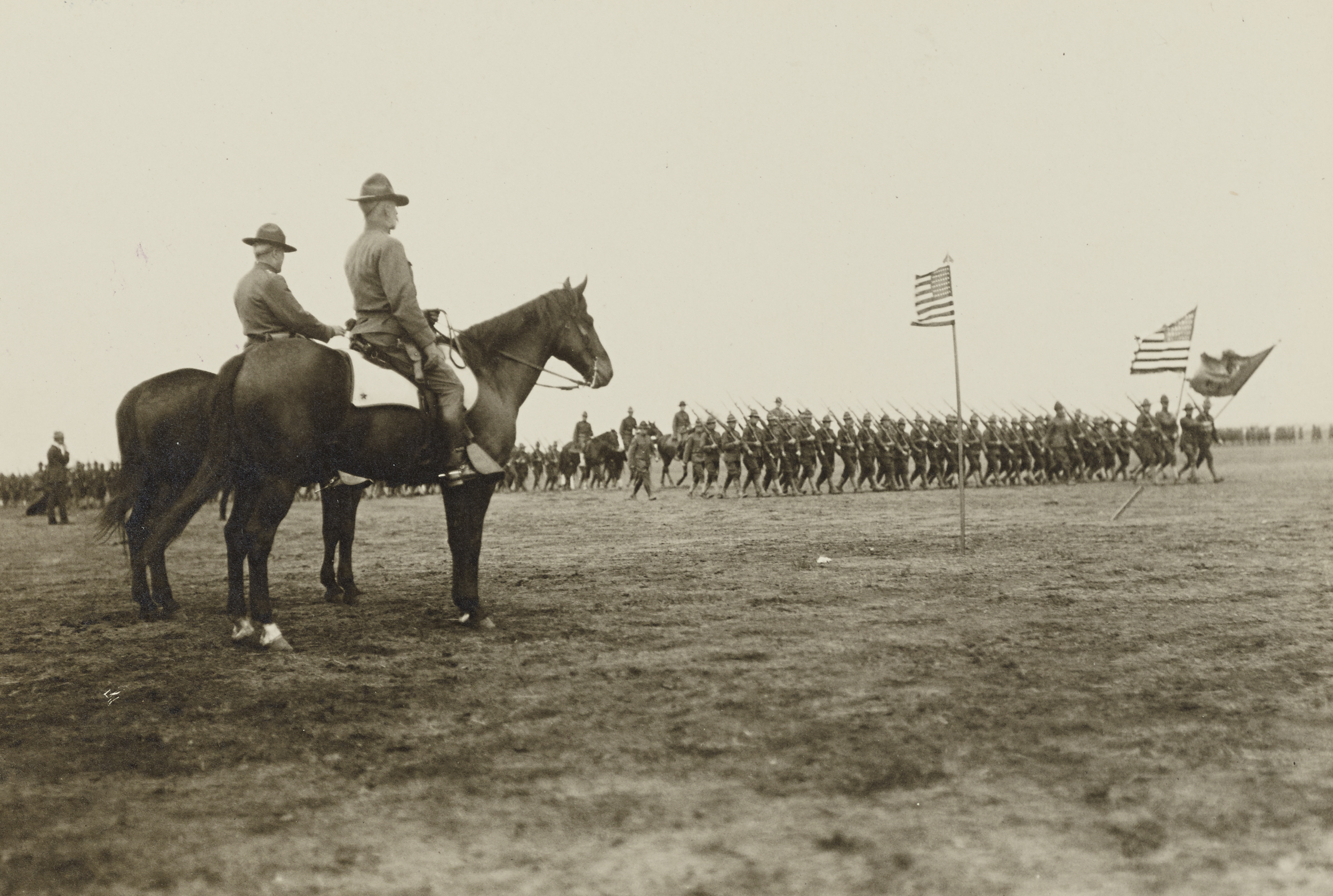
Major General Kennedy and Brigadier General Julius Penn reviewing troops at Camp Custer, Michigan, May 1918.

On 23 August 1917, Kennedy took command of the 78th Infantry Division at Camp Dix, NJ, before deploying with the American Expeditionary Forces in December 1917. Kennedy remained in France with the 78th until February 1918, when returned to the U.S. to take command of the 85th Infantry Division. The 85th deployed to France in August, 1918. He would remain in command of the 85th until March 1919.

=== Between the Wars ===
After the end of the First World War, Kennedy was placed in command of the Panama Canal Department from April 1919 to November 1921. Following this, he commanded the 9th Coastal Artillery District and the 9th Training Center at the Presidio of San Francisco until his retirement in 1922.

== Personal life ==
Kennedy married Elizabeth Lord Jewett (1867–1946) on 13 November 1889. He died in Washington, D.C., on 23 November 1936. He was buried at Arlington National Cemetery.
