= Isaac Littell =

United States Army general (1857–1924)

Isaac William Littell
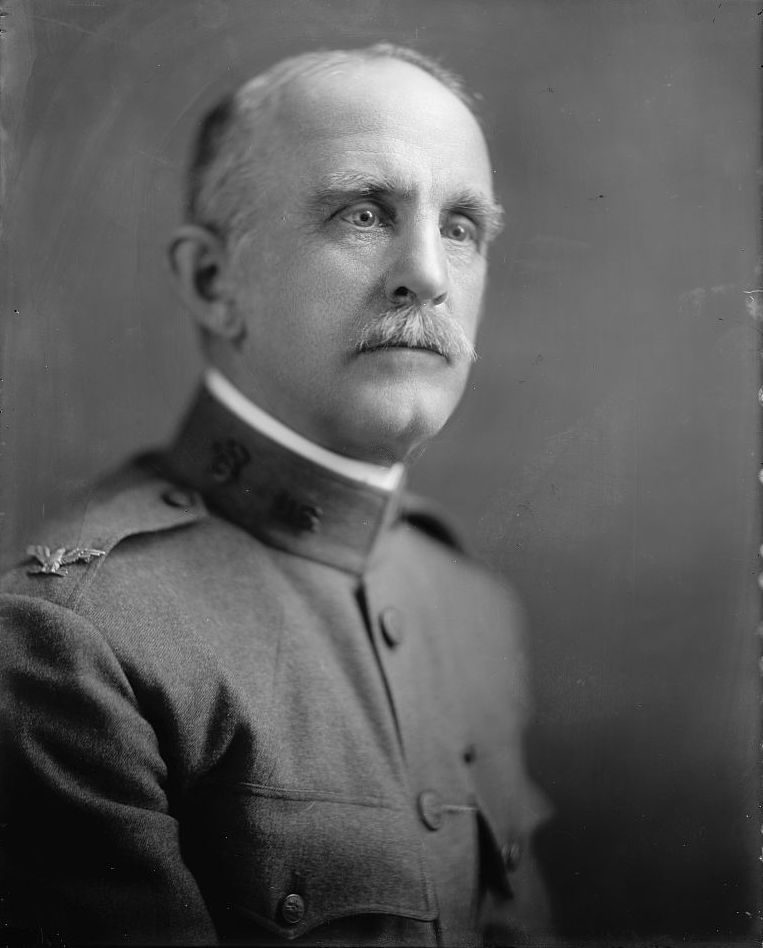
- Born: 5 December 1857; Elizabeth, New Jersey, U.S.
- Died: 1 May 1924 (aged 66); Walter Reed General Hospital, Washington, D.C., U.S.
- Burial place: Arlington National Cemetery Section 3, Grave 3948; 38.873651°N 77.071840°W
- Military career
- Allegiance: United States of America
- Branch: United States Army
- Service years: 1883–1919
- Rank: Brigadier General
- Service number: 0-13124
- Awards: Army Distinguished Service Medal

Isaac William Littell (5 December 1857 – 1 May 1924) was a United States Army brigadier general. He was awarded the Army Distinguished Service Medal for meritorious and distinguished service during World War I. Specifically, Littell was honored for building the camps and cantonments of the Army raised in the summer of 1917 as chief of the Cantonment Division of the Quartermaster General's Office.

== Military career ==
Isaac William Littell was born in Elizabeth, New Jersey, on 5 December 1857. He was appointed from that state to the United States Military Academy (USMA) at West Point, New York, where he graduated in June 1883, ranked 28th in his class of 52. Several of his classmates would, like Littell himself, rise to the rank of brigadier general or higher in their military careers, such as William C. Langfitt, Stephen M. Foote, John W. Ruckman, Ira A. Haynes, Chase W. Kennedy, Charles G. Morton, George H. Cameron, Tyree R. Rivers, John W. Heard, Harry C. Hale, Robert D. Walsh, George W. Read, Samson L. Faison, Frederick Perkins, Omar Bundy, Lawrence D. Tyson, Clarence R. Edwards

Following graduation, he was commissioned as a second lieutenant and was assigned to the 10th Infantry, where he saw duty in Colorado, Indian Territory, New Mexico and Oklahoma Territory. After five years in the infantry, he transferred to the Quartermaster Corps. He was promoted to captain on 25 April 1895 while serving as 10th Infantry Regimental Adjutant and subsequently assigned to Fort Sam Houston, Texas where he served as quartermaster from May 1895 to October 1897.

In 1897, he was ordered to the Quartermaster Depot in New York City where he served as assistant to the Depot Quartermaster until September 1899. In 1898, in the early stages of the U.S. Army's preparation for the Spanish–American War, he was responsible for acquiring all the clothing for the newly organized army units. He then served in the Philippines from 1899 to 1902, first as the quartermaster for the 1st Brigade, 2d Division, 8th Army Corps, and then Assistant to the Chief Quartermaster of the Division of the Pacific. Promoted to major during this time, he was assigned as Chief Quartermaster for various units until transferred back to New York in April 1902.

From July 1903 through November 1908, he served in the Quartermaster General's office in Washington, D.C. Promoted to lieutenant colonel on 18 March 1908 and assigned duties as the deputy quartermaster general, he was responsible for "matter pertaining to clothing, repairs to barracks, quarters, roads, walks and wharves, and matters pertaining to rail and water transportation and army transport service." In December, he was moved to Governors Island, in New York Harbor, to serve as chief quartermaster of the Eastern Division until promoted to colonel in March 1911. He then began another foreign service tour in the Philippines, where he served as chief quartermaster of the Philippine Department until June 1914.

Returning to Washington, D.C., he was once again assigned to the office of the quartermaster general. On 16 May 1917, a few weeks after the American entry into World War I, Littell established and became the first head of the Cantonment Division (later renamed the Construction Division). The division was charged with building for the draft army and United States National Guard camps, embarkation camps, terminals, arsenals, chemical plants, plants for the manufacture of explosives and their ingredients, hospitals and warehouses. Its first chore was to create, within 70 days, 16 Army camps with essential utilities and transportation routes, capable of sustaining 45,000 people each, while within the same time frame constructing the same number of smaller camps for the National Guard.

After the assignment of Major General George W. Goethals to acting quartermaster general, Littell and Goethals often clashed. In February 1918, after Goethals refused Littell's recommendation to commission and promote several reserve officers, Littell submitted his request for relief and retirement. Goethals readily accepted the request. After Littell had served in the rank of brigadier general for one year, he was allowed to retire.

War Department, General Orders No. 105 (1919)

== Personal life and retirement ==
Littell was married to the former Julia May Barrett (1866 - 1933) and had three daughters; Julia Adrianne (1893 - 1988) who married Alexander Patch, Mary Frances (1897 - 1986) who married Admiral George Sloan Bryan, and Ruth Lincoln Littell Owen (1897 - 1987), and two sons; Gregory Barrett Littell (married Dorothy Wreaks) and Isaac William Littell Jr.

Upon his retirement, Littell had been serving as Secretary-Treasurer at the United States Soldiers' Home, now part of the Armed Forces Retirement Home, in Washington, D.C. He died in at Walter Reed General Hospital in Washington, DC, on 1 May 1924. He and his wife are buried together in Arlington National Cemetery in Arlington, Virginia.

== Awards ==
- Distinguished Service Medal (U.S. Army)
- Indian Campaign Medal
- Spanish War Service Medal
- Philippine Campaign Medal
- World War I Victory Medal (United States)

=== Army Distinguished Service Medal Citation ===
"For exceptionally meritorious and distinguished services to the Government of the United States, in a duty of great responsibility during World War I. As Chief of the Cantonment Division of the Quartermaster General's Office, General Littell was charged with the task of building the camps and cantonments of the Army raised in the summer of 1917 under conditions imposing almost insuperable obstacles. His completion of this task is a conspicuous example of the exercise of qualities of mind and character making up the highest type of officer."
