= Robert D. Walsh =

U.S. Army brigadier general (1861–1928)

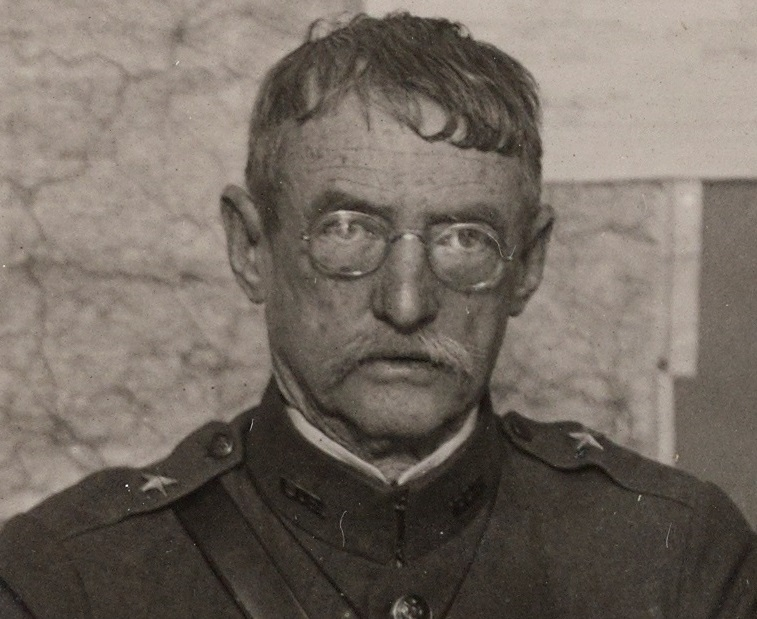
- Walsh as a brigadier general in France, February 1919
- Born: October 14, 1860; Alleghany, California, U.S.
- Died: August 15, 1928 (aged 67); Washington, District of Columbia, U.S.
- Burial place: Arlington National Cemetery
- Alma mater: United States Military Academy
- Spouse: Susan LeGrow (m. 1894–1928)
- Children: 1
- Relatives: John S. Winn (brother in law)
- Military career
- Service: United States Army
- Service years: 1883–1919
- Rank: Brigadier General
- Nickname: "Rosy"
- Service number: 0–13381
- Unit: U.S. Cavalry Branch
- Commands: U.S. Army Post, Quingua; U.S. Army Post, Santa Maria, Bulacan; 2nd Squadron, 11th Cavalry Regiment; 8th Cavalry Regiment; 78th Infantry Brigade; U.S. Army Base, Saint-Nazaire; U.S. Army Base, Bordeaux; 163rd Infantry Brigade
- Wars: American Indian Wars; Spanish–American War; Philippine–American War; Pancho Villa Expedition; World War I
- Awards: Army Distinguished Service Medal; Legion of Honor (Commander) (France)

Robert Douglas Walsh (October 10, 1860 – August 15, 1928) was a career officer in the United States Army. An 1883 graduate of the United States Military Academy, he was a veteran of the American Indian Wars, Spanish–American War, Philippine–American War, Pancho Villa Expedition, and World War I. Walsh served until retiring in 1919, and was a recipient of the Army Distinguished Service Medal and French Legion of Honor (Commander).

A native of Alleghany, California, Walsh was raised and educated in Redwood City. He was then appointed to the United States Military Academy at West Point. After his 1883 graduation, he was appointed a second lieutenant of Cavalry. At the start of his career, he served in the western United States during the American Indian Wars and Spanish–American War. Later assignments included several postings to the Philippines during the Philippine–American War. During the Pancho Villa Expedition, Walsh commanded the 8th Cavalry Regiment on the Texas-Mexico border.

During World War I, Walsh commanded two brigades and two U.S. bases in France and received promotion to temporary brigadier general. He retired in 1919, then worked as a New York City-based investment broker. He died in Washington, D.C., on August 15, 1928. Walsh was buried at Arlington National Cemetery.

== Early life ==
Robert D. Walsh was born in Alleghany, California on October 14, 1860, a son of Michael Walsh and Johanna Walsh. (Note: Walsh's gravestone indicates a birthdate of 1861, but Army records consistently give his date of birth as October 14, 1860.) He was raised and educated in Redwood City, California, and graduated from Redwood City Grammar School, the predecessor of the city's Sequoia High School.

In 1878, Walsh was appointed to the United States Military Academy at West Point. He graduated in 1883 ranked 37th of 52. Walsh's hair was red when he was a young man, causing his classmates to nickname him "Rosy," which they continued to use throughout their careers. Among his classmates were several who also attained general officer rank, including William C. Langfitt, John W. Ruckman, Ira A. Haynes, Chase W. Kennedy, Charles G. Morton, Isaac W. Littell, George H. Cameron, John W. Heard, Harry C. Hale, George W. Read, Samson L. Faison, Omar Bundy, Lawrence D. Tyson, and Clarence R. Edwards. Among his notable classmates who did not become generals was Colonel Thomas Ridgway.

Walsh received his commission as a second lieutenant of Infantry and was assigned to the 22nd Infantry Regiment, but was soon afterwards transferred to the Cavalry and posted to the 4th Cavalry Regiment at Fort Stanton, New Mexico Territory.

== Start of career ==
From September 1883 to May 1884, Walsh served with the 4th Cavalry at Fort Stanton. He was then assigned to American Indian Wars duty at Fort Huachuca, Arizona Territory and San Carlos Apache Indian Reservation, including an 1885 expedition against the Apache. He remained in Arizona until June 1887. From July 1887 to October 1887, he served at Fort Myer, Virginia, after which he returned to Arizona, where he served at Fort Huachuca and Fort Bowie. In February 1890, he received a brevet promotion to first lieutenant to recognize his heroism during an 1886 engagement against the Apache in the Patagonia Mountains.

In June 1890, Walsh was assigned to Fort Walla Walla, Washington. In March 1891, he was promoted to first lieutenant in the 5th Cavalry Regiment, and in April 1891 he was transferred back to the 4th Cavalry. From July 1891 to September 1893 he served at Jefferson Barracks, Missouri. In September 1893, he was posted to Boise Barracks, Idaho, where he served until July 1899. During the Spanish–American War in 1898, Walsh served as mustering officer for United States Volunteers from Idaho and other nearby states, and in March 1899 he was promoted to captain in the 9th Cavalry Regiment.

In July 1899, Walsh was promoted to temporary major in the 35th United States Volunteer Infantry Regiment. He served with this regiment in the Philippines during the Philippine–American War. He was promoted to temporary lieutenant colonel in December 1899, and served with the 35th Infantry until it was inactivated in April 1901. During his posting to the Philippines, Walsh served with the 35th Infantry at San Isidro, Nueva Ecija (November 1899 to January 1900), as commander of the post at Quingua (January to May 1900), with the regiment at Balbalan, San Miguel and Quingua (May to November 1900), and as commander of the post at Santa Maria, Bulacan (November 1900 to March 1901).

== Continued career ==
After returning from the Philippines, Walsh was reduced to his permanent rank of captain, and he performed mustering out duty for United States Volunteers at the Presidio of San Francisco from May to July 1901. He served again at Fort Walla Walla from July to November 1901, and was assigned to duty as inspector of horses. He was on recruiting duty at Fort Slocum, New York from November 1901 to January 1902.

Walsh was posted to the Philippines again in January 1902, and he remained on duty there until October. He was assigned to Fort Walla Walla as commander of a Cavalry troop from October 1902 to October 1904. He continued in command at Fort Leavenworth, Kansas, where he served from October 1904 to July 1906. From July to September 1906, Walsh was chief quartermaster of the summer maneuver camp that took place at Fort Leavenworth. He was again in command of a Cavalry troop from September 1906 to July 1908. From August 1908 to January 1911, Walsh performed recruiting duty in Chicago. He was transferred to the 13th Cavalry in February 1909, and was promoted to permanent major in February 1910.

From January to March 1911, Walsh was a student at the Fort Leavenworth Army Service Schools. He was then assigned to Fort Sam Houston, Texas as commander of 2nd Squadron, 11th Cavalry Regiment, where he served from March to August 1911. From August 1911 to June 1912, he was a student at the United States Army War College. He performed detached staff duty at Governors Island, New York from August to October 1912, after which he was assigned to take the Mounted Service School course at Fort Riley, Kansas. In December 1912, Walsh was assigned to command of a Cavalry squadron at Fort Oglethorpe, Georgia.

== Later career ==
In May 1913, Walsh was transferred to the 8th Cavalry Regiment, with which he served at Camp Stotsenburg, Philippines from July 1913 to November 1914. In April 1914, he was promoted to permanent lieutenant colonel. He remained in the Philippines and served at Fort William McKinley from November 1914 to August 1915. After his return to the United States, Walsh served during the Pancho Villa Expedition as commander of the 8th Cavalry at Fort Bliss, Texas.

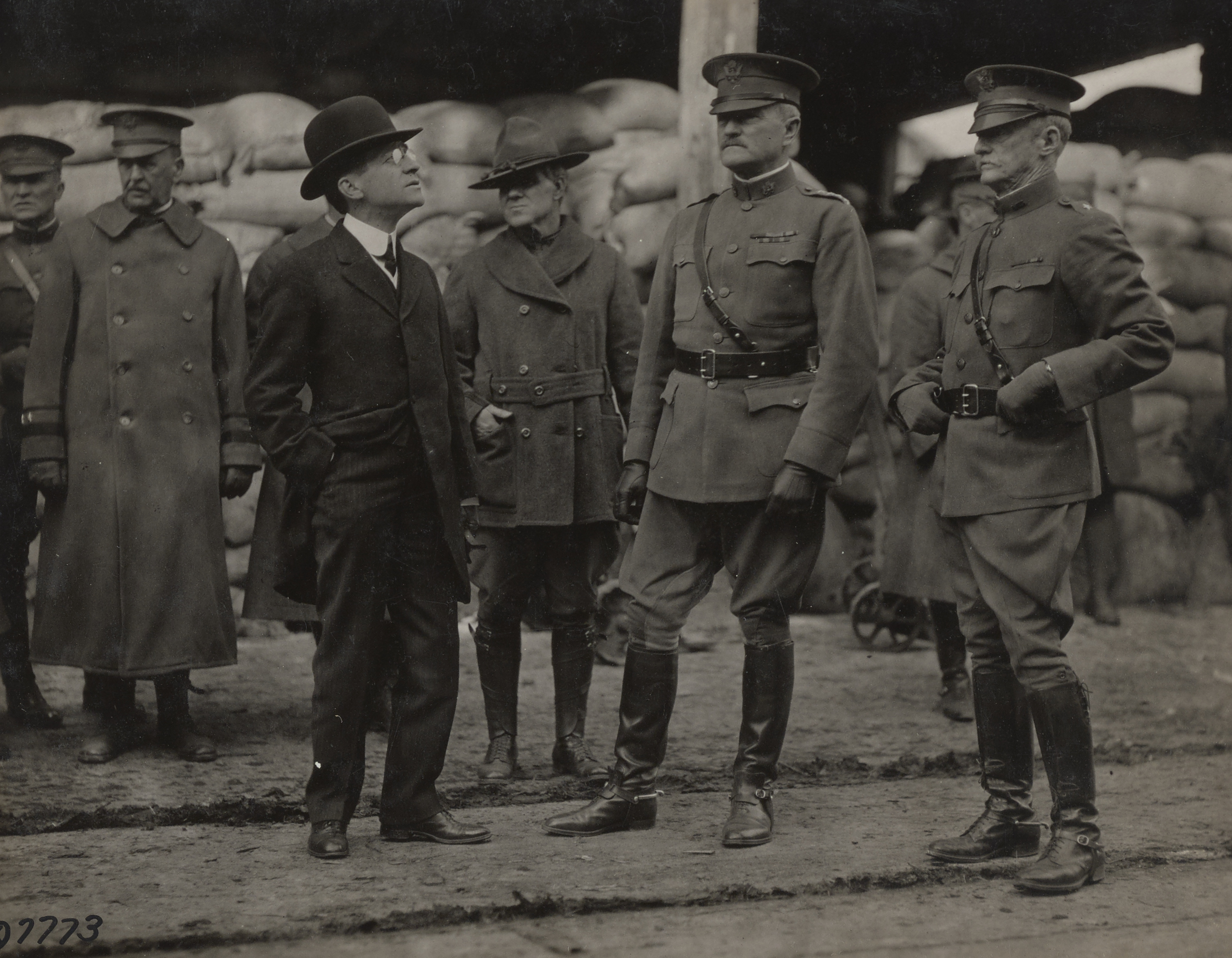
Secretary of War Newton D. Baker, General John J. Pershing, Brigadier General Robert D. Walsh, and other officers in a storehouse at Saint-Nazaire, France, March 1918.

Walsh performed recruiting duty in New York City from April 1916 to August 1917, and he was promoted to colonel in July 1916. In August 1917, four months after the American entry into World War I, he was promoted to temporary brigadier general and assigned to Camp Beauregard, Louisiana, where he assumed command of the 78th Infantry Brigade, a unit of the 39th Division. He led this brigade through its organization and training, then traveled with it to France. He served as commander of the army base at Saint-Nazaire from December 1917 to July 1918. From July to November 1918, he was deputy director of transportation for the American Expeditionary Forces. From November 1918 to March 1919, Walsh commanded the army base at Bordeaux.

From March to May 1919, Walsh commanded the 163rd Infantry Brigade, a unit of the 82nd Division, which he led from France to the United States and demobilized. On June 1, 1919, he returned to his permanent rank of colonel, and he retired on June 30. Walsh's wartime service was recognized with award of the Army Distinguished Service Medal and French Legion of Honor (Commander).

After retiring, Walsh lived in New York City, where he worked as an investment broker. He died in Washington, D.C., on August 15, 1928. Walsh was buried at Arlington National Cemetery. In 1930, the U.S. Congress enacted a law permitting World War I's general officers to retire at their highest rank, and Walsh's grade of brigadier general was posthumously restored.

== Family ==
In 1894, Walsh married Susan LeGrow; her sister Grace was the wife of Brigadier General John S. Winn. Robert and Susan Walsh were the parents of son Robert LeGrow Walsh, a career officer who retired as a major general.
