= John W. Heard =

U.S. Army officer and Spanish-American War Medal of Honor recipient

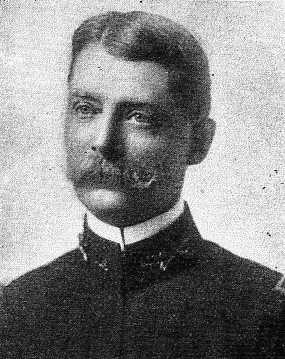
- Born: March 27, 1860; Senatobia, Mississippi, U.S.
- Died: February 4, 1922 (aged 61); New Orleans, Louisiana, U.S.
- Military career
- Allegiance: United States of America
- Branch: United States Army
- Service years: 1883–1922
- Rank: Brigadier General
- Commands: 14th Cavalry Regiment; 9th Cavalry Regiment; Hawaiian Department; 4th Cavalry Regiment; 5th Cavalry Regiment; 8th Cavalry Regiment
- Conflicts: Spanish–American War; Philippine–American War; World War I
- Awards: Medal of Honor

John William (or Wilkinson) Heard (March 27, 1860 – February 4, 1922) was a United States Army Brigadier General who was a recipient of the Medal of Honor for valor in action on July 23, 1898, near Bahia Honda, Cuba.

== Early life and education ==
Heard was born on Woodstock Plantation, near Senatobia, Mississippi. He was appointed to West Point, graduating with the class of 1883. Several of his classmates would go on to become general officers in their careers, such as Charles W. Kennedy, George H. Cameron, Harry C. Hale, George W. Read, Lawrence Tyson, Ira A. Haynes, Samson L. Faison, William C. Langfitt, Robert D. Walsh, Omar Bundy, Charles G. Morton, Tyree R. Rivers, John W. Ruckman, Isaac Littell and Clarence R. Edwards.

== During the Spanish–American War ==
Heard deployed to Cuba as part of the 3rd US Cavalry. He departed Florida with his unit and 40-50 Cuban soldiers aboard the wooden fruit transport Wanderer, landing near the mouth of the Mani-Mani River near Bahia Hondo, west of Havana. A force of nearly 1,000 Spanish Cavalry charged Heard's vastly outnumbered force as they were unloading supplies on the beach. Heard's command of his men halted the Spanish force's charge and caused them to fall back. Heard successfully regrouped his men and had them reboard their ship, evacuating all of his soldiers and wounded, leaving no one behind. Lieutenant Heard was awarded the Medal of Honor on June 21, 1899, for his actions at the Battle of Mani-Mani.

== During World War I ==
He was promoted to brigadier general in the National Army on October 1, 1918. He commanded the Hawaiian Department.

== Postwar career ==
In June 1919, Heard reverted to his permanent rank of colonel. Prior to the war, he had commanded the 8th Cavalry Regiment, the 5th Cavalry Regiment and then the 4th Cavalry Regiment. After the war, Heard commanded the 9th Cavalry Regiment at Camp Stotsenburg in the Philippines from September 1919 to November 1920. Returning to the United States, he commanded the 14th Cavalry Regiment at Fort Sam Houston from December 1920 to January 1922.

== Medal of Honor citation ==
"For extraordinary heroism on 23 July 1898, while serving with 3d U.S. Cavalry, in action at Bahia Honda, Cuba. After two men had been shot down by Spaniards while transmitting orders to the engine-room on the Wanderer, the ship having become disabled, First Lieutenant Heard took the position held by them and personally transmitted the orders, remaining at his post until the ship was out of danger."

== Other awards and honors ==
He was recognized by Hawaii's legislature for his services upon retirement.

== Family and personal life ==
He married Mildred Jewell Townsend of New York City on June 3, 1886. Together, they had five sons and two daughters.

== Death and legacy ==
He died on February 4, 1922, in New Orleans. Heard and his wife were buried at the West Point Cemetery.
