= Harry Clay Hale =

U.S. Army general (1861–1946)

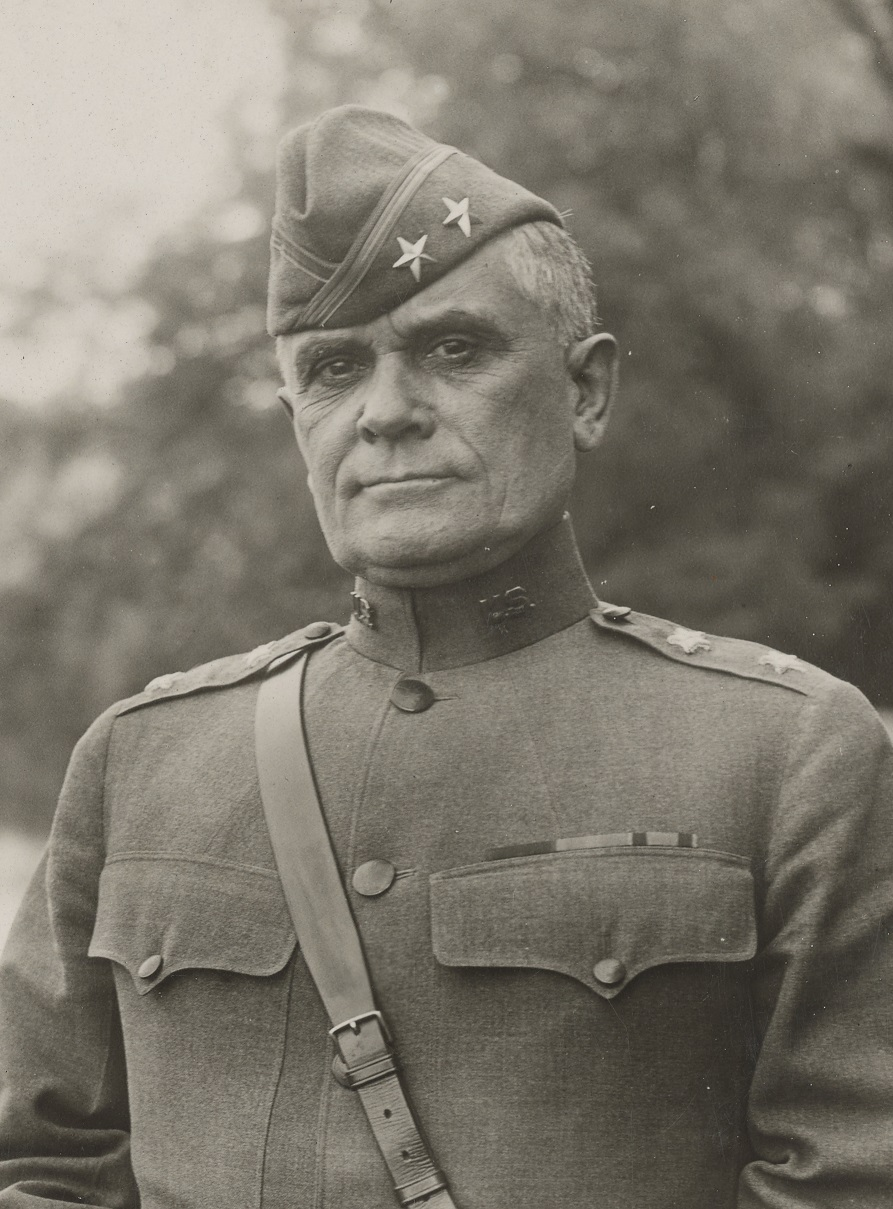
- Harry C. Hale, pictured here in November 1918 as a major general in command of the 84th Division.
- Born: July 10, 1861; Knoxville, Illinois, United States
- Died: March 21, 1946 (aged 84); Palo Alto, California, United States
- Burial place: Arlington National Cemetery, Virginia, United States
- Spouse: Elizabeth C. Smith
- Military career
- Allegiance: United States
- Branch: United States Army
- Service years: 1883–1925
- Rank: Major General
- Service number: 0-45
- Unit: Infantry Branch
- Commands: 17th Regiment; 20th Regiment; 15th Regiment; 84th Division; 26th Division; 1st Division; Sixth Corps Area
- Conflicts: Sioux Wars; Spanish–American War; Philippine–American War; Border War (1910–19); World War I
- Awards: Army Distinguished Service Medal

Major General Harry Clay Hale (July 10, 1861 – March 21, 1946) was a United States Army officer in the late 19th and early 20th centuries. He served in several conflicts, including World War I, and received the Army Distinguished Service Medal.

== Military career ==
Henry Clay Hale was born on July 10, 1861, in Knoxville, Illinois, as the son of T. Judson Hale and Sarah Payne Pierce. Destined for a military career, he entered the United States Military Academy (USMA) as the youngest member of his class in July 1879 and graduated from there almost four years later in June 1883. Among his classmates included several future general officers, such as George Windle Read, Chase Wilmot Kennedy, Omar Bundy, George H. Cameron, Samson L. Faison, Lawrence Tyson, Charles Gould Morton, Tyree R. Rivers, John Wilkinson Heard, Ira Allen Haynes, William Campbell Langfitt, John Wilson Ruckman, Robert D. Walsh, Isaac Littell and Clarence Ransom Edwards.

Hale was originally commissioned in the 12th Infantry Regiment and was stationed at Fort Niagara. He and his regiment went to Fort Bennett in 1886, and he participated in the Sioux Wars while there. He was recommended for the Medal of Honor, though he ultimately did not receive it. Hale was in charge of Sioux prisoners in 1891, and he served as an aide to Wesley Merritt from 1893 to 1899, meaning he served in the Philippines during the Spanish–American War. He also served as an aide to Arthur MacArthur Jr. Hale commanded the 44th Volunteer infantry during the Philippine–American War, and he commanded Bilibid Prison in 1902. He also served as the acting commander of the 20th Infantry Regiment during the Battle of Luzon.

After serving on the General Staff in Washington, D.C., from 1903 to 1906, Hale returned to the Philippines for another three years. In 1910 and 1911, he was the Adjutant-General of the Department of the Lakes and the Department of the Missouri. Hale commanded the 17th Infantry Regiment along the border with Mexico in 1914, and he commanded the 20th Infantry Regiment in 1915. Also in 1915, Hale was sent to China to command the 15th Infantry Regiment, though he returned to the United States shortly afterward in order to organize the 84th Division at Camp Zachary Taylorl after the American entry into World War I. After going to France in late 1917 as a combat observer, Hale returned to the United States and took the 84th Division to France the following year but it did not see combat. Walter Krueger, who would later rise to prominence during World War II, served for a while with the 84th Division as its chief of staff.

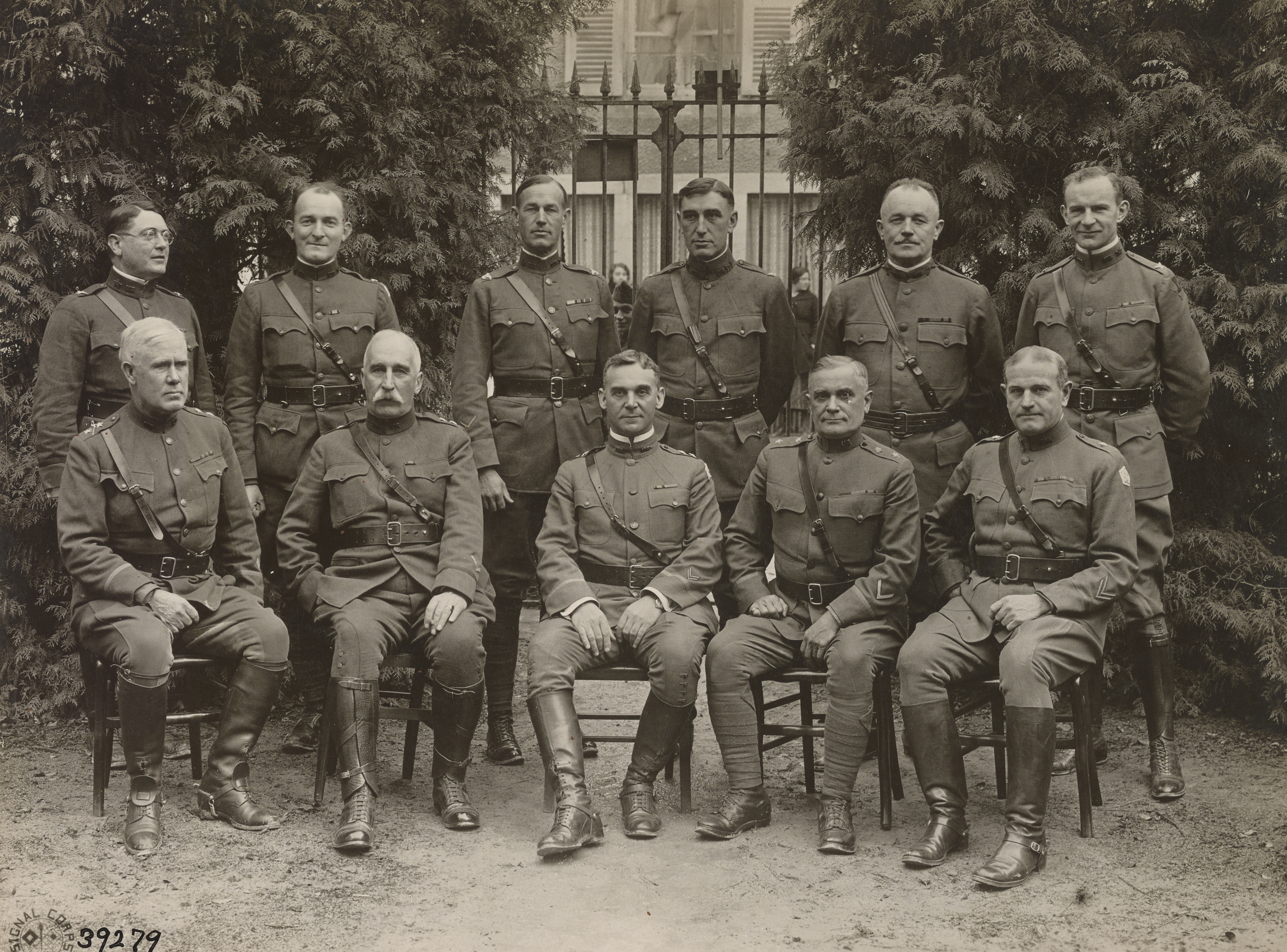
Major General Charles Pelot Summerall, sat in the middle, along with members of his staff and senior commanders in his V Corps, pictured here in 1918 or 1919. Major General Harry C. Hale, commanding the 26th Division, is sat to Summerall's left.

Hale was promoted to the rank of major general on August 5, 1917, shortly after his promotion to brigadier general, and he received the Army Distinguished Service Medal for his command of the 84th Division. The citation for the medal reads:

The President of the United States of America, authorized by Act of Congress, July 9, 1918, takes pleasure in presenting the Army Distinguished Service Medal to Major General Harry Clay Hale, United States Army, for exceptionally meritorious and distinguished services to the Government of the United States, in a duty of great responsibility during World War I. While in Command of the 84th Division during its organization and training in the United States and after the armistice in Command of the 29th Division in France, by his ceaseless energy and closest personal supervision of the training, discipline, and supply of his commands, General Hale displayed rare qualities of leadership, organization, tact, and judgment. His brilliant professional attainments, his steadfast devotion to duty, and his loyalty to superiors were reflected in the high standards maintained throughout the divisions under his command, and he thus rendered important services to the American Expeditionary Forces and contributed conspicuously to the success of the operations.

After the Armistice with Germany which brought the war to an end, Hale assumed command of the 26th Division and brought it back to the United States from France. After this, he then commanded the 1st Division and then was the commanding general of the Sixth Corps Area in Chicago. Hale received an LL.D. from Knox College in 1923, and he retired from the army, after more than forty years of service, in 1925.

Hale lived in Palo Alto, California, or Rockville, Maryland, during his retirement, and he died on March 21, 1946, at the age of 84. He was buried at Arlington National Cemetery.

== Personal life ==
Hale married Elizabeth C. Smith on December 2, 1886. They had no children.

== Bibliography ==
- Davis, Henry Blaine Jr. (1998). Generals in Khaki. Raleigh, North Carolina: Pentland Press. ISBN 1571970886. OCLC 40298151.
- Marquis Who's Who (1975). Who Was Who In American History – The Military. Chicago, Illinois: Marquis Who's Who. ISBN 0837932017.

Military offices
Preceded by Wilbert E. Wilder	Commanding General 84th Division; 1917–1919	Succeeded by Post deactivated
Preceded by Frank E. Bamford	Commanding General 26th Division; 1918–1919	Succeeded by Post deactivated
Preceded by Charles T. Menoher	Commanding General 1st Division; February–December 1922	Succeeded by William S. Graves
Preceded by George Moseley	Commanding General Sixth Corps Area; 1922–1925	Succeeded by William S. Graves
