= William Campbell Langfitt =

United States Army general

William Langfitt
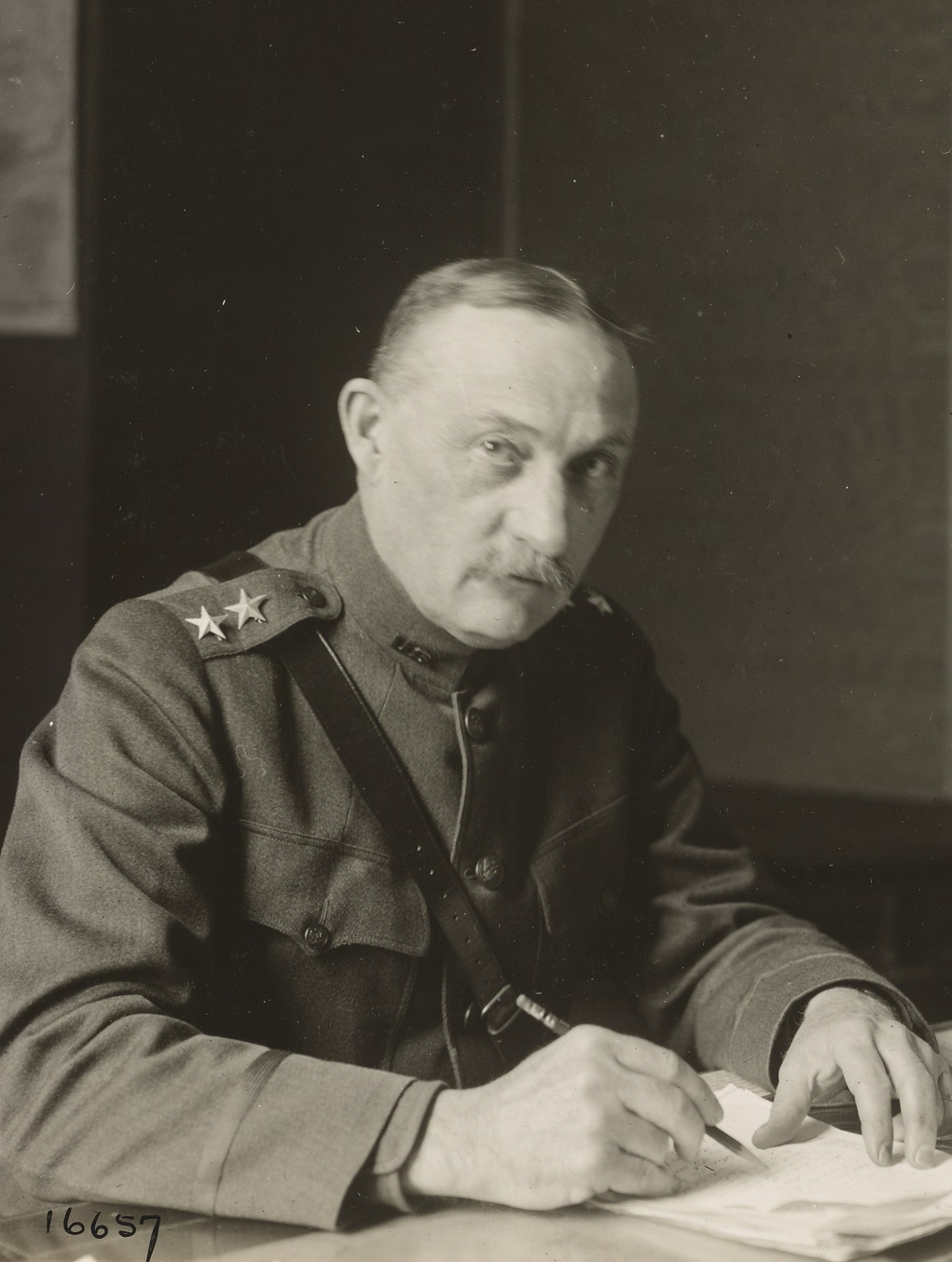
- Major general William Langfitt, Tours, April 1918
- Born: August 10, 1860; Wellsburg, Virginia, U.S.
- Died: April 20, 1934 (aged 73); Washington, D.C., U.S.
- Burial place: Arlington National Cemetery
- Military career
- Allegiance: United States
- Branch: United States Army
- Service years: 1883–1922
- Rank: Major general
- Unit: United States Army Corps of Engineers
- Conflicts: Spanish–American War; World War I
- Awards: Distinguished Service Medal; Order of the Bath (Great Britain); Legion of Honor (France); Order of the Crown (Belgium)

William Campbell Langfitt (10 August 1860 – 20 April 1934) was a major general in the United States Army. He was prominent as the chief of staff and chief engineer for the American Expeditionary Forces in World War I.

== Early life ==
Langfitt was born in Wellsburg, Virginia (now West Virginia). He attended Ohio State University, where he was a member of Phi Kappa Psi fraternity, and graduated from the United States Military Academy (USMA) at West Point, New York, in 1883, ranked second in his class. Several of his classmates would go on to become general officers in their careers, such as Chase Wilmot Kennedy, George H. Cameron, Harry Clay Hale, George Windle Read, John William Heard, Ira Allen Haynes, Samson L. Faison, Omar Bundy, Robert D. Walsh, Lawrence Tyson, Charles Gould Morton, Tyree R. Rivers, John Wilson Ruckman, Isaac Littell and Clarence Ransom Edwards.

Assigned to the Engineer branch, Langfitt completed the Engineer School of Application at Fort Totten in 1885. From 1886 to 1888 Langfitt was on the staff of the Department of the Columbia. From 1888 to 1893 he served at the Port of Galveston, where he planned and oversaw completion of river and harbor improvement projects.

From 1893 to 1895, Langfitt worked on projects to improve navigation on the Ohio River. Langfitt was an instructor at the Engineer School from 1895 to 1898.

== Spanish–American War ==
During the Spanish–American War, Langfitt was promoted to major with the 2nd United States Volunteer Engineer Regiment, and served in the Hawaiian Islands.

After the war, Langfitt was assigned as an engineer officer with the Army's 13th Lighthouse District (Alaska and Washington), responsible for planning and supervising maintenance and construction of lighthouses and other port facilities.

== Post-war ==
Langfitt was commander of the Engineer School and Depot in Washington, D.C., from 1905 to 1906. In 1906 and 1907 he was chief engineer for Army forces occupying Cuba, after which he resumed command of the Engineer School until 1910.

From 1910 to 1914, Langfitt was responsible for river and harbor improvements in the Washington, D.C., area, as well as improvements to municipal water supply. From 1914 to 1916, he was chief engineer of the Southern Department, responsible for improving rivers and harbors in and around Savannah, Georgia.

== World War I ==
In May, 1917, Langfitt organized the 13th Engineer Regiment as part of an expansion of the Army in preparation for World War I. He commanded the regiment until August, when he was promoted to brigadier general and joined the American Expeditionary Forces as chief of staff. From October, 1917 to May, 1918, Langfitt commanded all U.S. forces in Europe as they prepared for the arrival of the bulk of the A.E.F. In December 1917, Langfitt was promoted to major general.

From March 1918 until the end of the war, Langfitt was the A.E.F's chief engineer, which gave him command of the organization's utilities and transportation, including the Departments of Construction, Forestry, Light Railways, and Roads and Motor Transportation. He participated in all the major battles, including the first Battle of Cambrai, the Somme Defensive, and the St. Mihiel and Meuse-Argonne Offensives.

== Post–World War I ==
Following World War I Langfitt returned to the United States, where he reverted to the permanent rank of colonel and served as district engineer in New York and Puerto Rico until retiring in 1922.

== Retirement and death ==
In retirement, Langfitt resided in Geneva, New York. He died in Washington, D.C., on April 20, 1934. He was buried at Arlington National Cemetery, Section 7, Grave 10091.

== Awards ==
Langfitt's awards and decorations included: the Army Distinguished Service Medal; Companion of the Order of the Bath (Great Britain); Commander of the Legion of Honor (France); and Commander of the Order of the Crown (Belgium). The citation for his Army DSM reads:

The President of the United States of America, authorized by Act of Congress, July 9, 1918, takes pleasure in presenting the Army Distinguished Service Medal to Major General William Campbell Langfitt, United States Army, for exceptionally meritorious and distinguished services to the Government of the United States, in a duty of great responsibility during World War I. As Director of Light, Railways, and Roads, and later as Chief of Utilities, General Langfitt displayed great ability and marked breadth of vision. As Chief Engineer of the American Expeditionary Forces his brilliant professional attainments, untiring energy, and devotion to duty placed his department in a state of efficiency and enabled it to perform its important function in the most satisfactory manner.

== Legacy ==
The USS General W. C. Langfitt (AP-151), a United States Navy transport ship, was commissioned on September 30, 1944. It continued to be used as a transport ship until 1969, when it was sold to a private company and overhauled for civilian service. The Langfitt transported containerized cargo as the SS Transindiana until being scrapped in 1983.
