= Samson L. Faison =

United States Army general

Samson Lane Faison
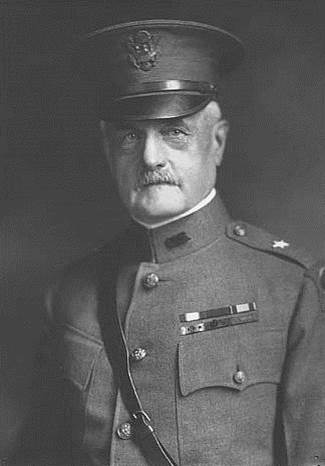
- Born: November 29, 1860; Faison, North Carolina, U.S.
- Died: October 17, 1940 (aged 79); Baltimore, Maryland, U.S.
- Relatives: LCDR S. Lane Faison (son)
- Military career
- Allegiance: United States of America
- Branch: United States Army
- Service years: 1883–1922
- Rank: Brigadier General
- Commands: 30th Infantry Division
- Conflicts: Apache Wars; Philippine–American War; World War I
- Awards: Distinguished Service Medal

Samson Lane Faison (November 29, 1860 – October 17, 1940) was a brigadier general in the United States Army who commanded the 30th Infantry Division at various times during World War I. He received the Distinguished Service Medal for his significant role in the breaking of the German's Hindenburg Line.

== Personal life ==
Faison was born in Faison, North Carolina (Duplin County) to Elias James Faison and Elizabeth Maria Lane. He had four brothers and two sisters. A North Carolina state historical marker stands today in the town bearing his name, birthplace, and accomplishments. Faison married Eleanor Sowers in 1906 and had two children, S. Lane Faison Jr. and Eleanor. His son Lane had a distinguished career as an art historian, member of the OSS's Art Looting Investigation Unit in World War II, and long-time faculty member at Williams College.

== Career highlights ==
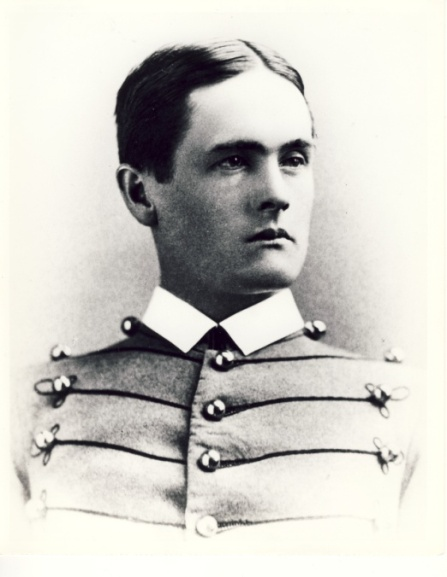
Faison's 1883 West Point Graduation photo

=== Apache Wars and Geronimo Campaign ===
Several of his classmates at West Point would go on to become general officers in their careers, such as Charles W. Kennedy, George H. Cameron, Harry C. Hale, George W. Read, John W. Heard, Ira A. Haynes, Omar Bundy, William C. Langfitt, Robert D. Walsh, Lawrence Tyson, Charles G. Morton, Tyree R. Rivers, John W. Ruckman, Isaac Littell and Clarence R. Edwards.

Following his graduation, he served in the Arizona Territory with the 1st Infantry from 1883 to 1886 during the final years of the Apache Wars. In 1885, Lt. Faison was selected by General George Crook to lead Apache Scout Companies into Mexico to help track down the Apache war leader, Geronimo. Faison was in the field for 11 months during 1885–1886 and was one of the few officers present at the council between Crook and Geronimo in March 1886, famously documented by photographer C. S. Fly. General Crook later recognized Faison and six other officers "for bearing uncomplainingly the almost incredible fatigues and privations as well as the dangers incident to their operations" while they "commanded expeditions or Indian Scouts in Mexico." In 1898 Faison wrote a memoir of his experience in the 1885-1886 Geronimo Campaign, which was published posthumously in 2012 in the Journal of the Southwest.

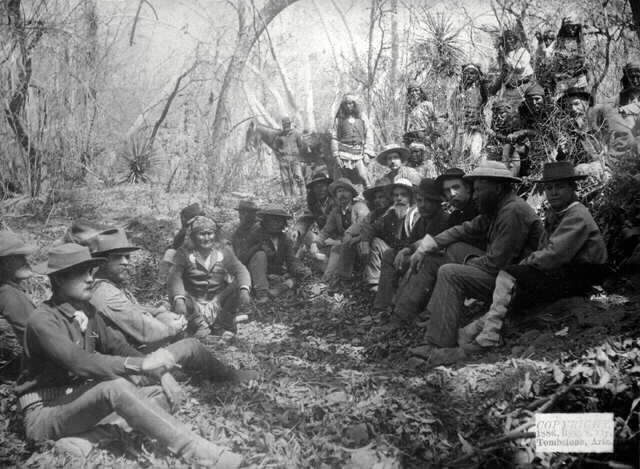
Council Between Gen. Crook and Geronimo in Mexico, March 1886. Lt. Faison is seated far left in foreground.

=== West Point and the Philippines ===
From 1896 to 1899, Lt. Faison was senior instructor of infantry tactics at the United States Military Academy. In 1899, Captain Faison left West Point to participate in the Philippine–American War where he served in several combat operations against the Philippine insurrection with the 13th Infantry. He also served as adjutant general and later as judge advocate of military commissions and as judge of the provost court in the Philippines until 1902. That fall he returned to the US and assumed command of Fort Mason in San Francisco.

=== Army War College ===
Major Faison attended the United States Army War College from 1910 to 1911. Upon graduation, he served briefly as an instructor and administrator.

=== World War I ===
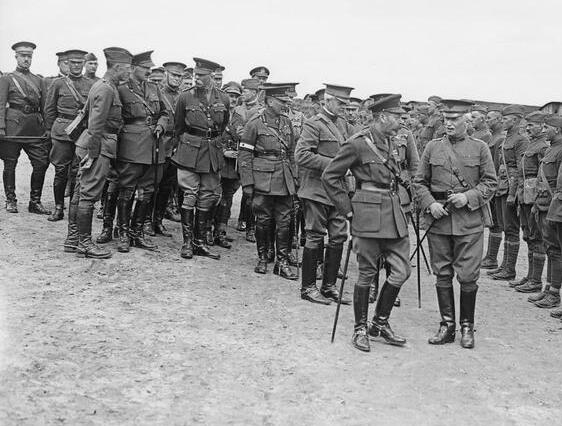
British King George V, along with Major General Edward M. Lewis, commander of the U.S. 30th Division, review elements of Lewis's division in France, August 6, 1918. Stood behind the King is Brigadier General Samson L. Faison, commanding the 30th Division's 60th Brigade.

After the United States entered the war, Colonel Faison accepted a wartime promotion of brigadier general in August 1917 and command of the 60th Brigade of the 30th Infantry Division. General Faison commanded the Division for several periods during both its training phase in South Carolina and while in France. During the 2nd Somme offensive in September–October 1918, Faison's 60th brigade is said by at least one source to have been the first Americans to break through the German Hindenburg Line at Bellicourt, France. Faison's Distinguished Service Medal citation reads as follows:

For exceptionally meritorious and distinguished services. He commanded with great credit the 60th Infantry Brigade in the breaking of the enemy's Hindenburg line at Bellicourt, France, and in subsequent operations in which important captures were made, all marking him as a military commander of great energy and determination.

General Faison is credited in the breaking of the enemy's Hindenburg line at Bellicourt, France.

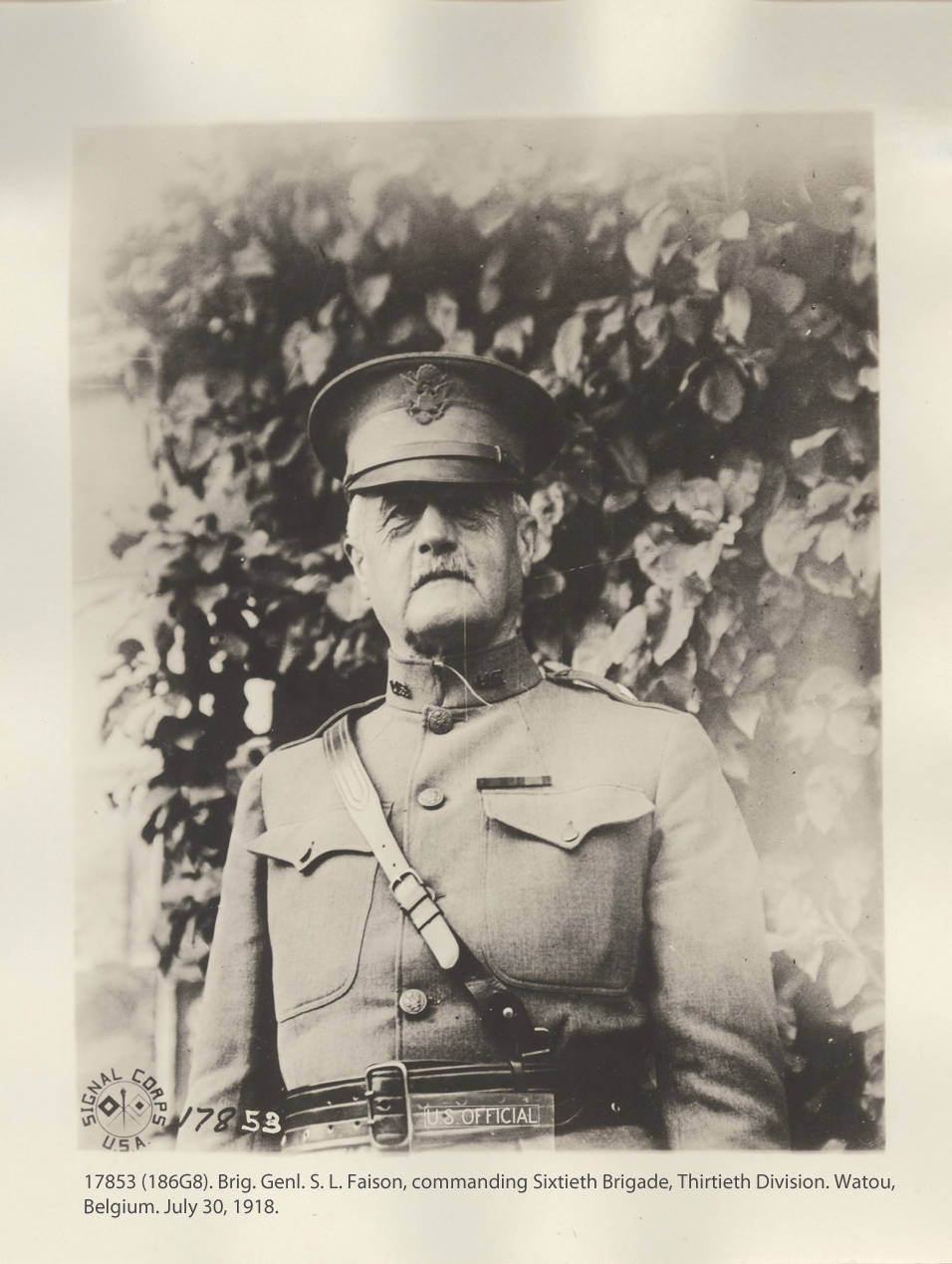
Brigadier General Faison in Belgium 1918

== Later career and life ==
After the world war, Faison returned to his permanent rank of colonel, but was officially promoted to brigadier general in 1922. He retired from active duty later that same year because of physical disabilities. Faison died in Baltimore, Maryland, on October 17, 1940, at the age of 79 and is buried at Arlington National Cemetery.

== Awards and honors ==
Here is the ribbon bar of Brigadier General Faison:

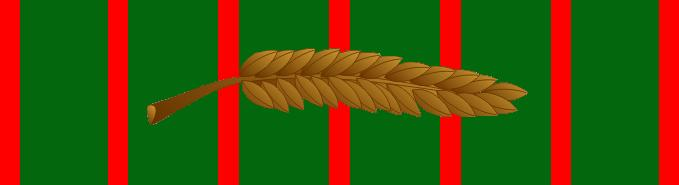

1st Row	Army Distinguished Service Medal	Indian Campaign Medal	Philippine Campaign Medal
2nd Row	World War I Victory Medal with three battle Clasps	Officer of the Legion of Honour (France)	Croix de guerre 1914–1918 with Palm (France)

== Bibliography ==
- Strategy and Tactics
- Yockelson, Mitchell A. (May 30, 2008). Borrowed Soldiers: Americans under British Command, 1918. Foreword by John S. D. Eisenhower. University of Oklahoma Press. ISBN 978-0-8061-3919-7.
