= Infantry and Cavalry School =

Infantry and Cavalry School may refer to:

- United States Army Cavalry School, training programs and centers for horse mounted troops
- United States Army Command and General Staff College, a graduate school in Fort Leavenworth, Kansas, for United States Army and sister service officers
- United States Army Infantry School, a school in Fort Benning, Georgia for training infantrymen for service in the United States Army
