= Battle of Manimani =

- Part of the Spanish–American War
- Province of Pinar del Rio in Cuba
Date	July 23, 1898
Location	Mantua Pinar del Río, Cuba
Result	Spanish victory

Belligerents
Spain	United States; Cuban rebels

Commanders and leaders
Unknown	John Heard

Strength
1,000	262

Casualties and losses
12 wounded	3 killed 10 wounded

The Battle of Manimani was a failed American landing attempt west of Bahia Honda, Cuba. On July 23, 1898, the U.S.S. Wanderer was disabled at the mouth of the Manimani River, after Spanish forces opened fire and shot two men. The ship eventually reached safety after Lieutenant John Heard took their position and transmitted orders to the engine room.

It was one of the final engagements of the Spanish–American War in Cuba.

== Background ==
On July 23, 1898, Lieutenant John Heard anchored his force at the mouth of the Mani-Mani River and began unloading supplies intended for the Cuban insurgents operating in northwestern Cuba, unaware that the Spanish had discovered his presence and assembled a large force of cavalry in the environs.

== Battle ==
Catching the Americans off guard, Spanish cavalry advanced out onto the beach and opened fire upon the landing parties. Heard ordered his men to take cover and return fire. Pounded by accurate American volleys, the Spanish withdrew back into the jungle.

Lieutenant Heard used the temporary respite to order an immediate retreat, evacuating his wounded into the USS Wanderer and preparing to lift anchor just as the Spaniards reappeared, unleashing a hail of fire at those on the deck.

== Aftermath ==
John Heard was awarded a Medal of Honor on June 21, 1899, for his actions at Manimani. The award noted:

After two men had been shot down by Spaniards while transmitting orders to the engine-room on the Wanderer, the ship having become disabled, this officer took the position held by them and personally transmitted the orders, remaining at his post until the ship was out of danger.
