= 15th Cavalry Division (United States) =

- Active: 27 November 1917 – 12 May 1918
- Country: United States of America
- Branch: United States Army
- Type: Cavalry
- Size: Division
- Garrison/HQ: Fort Bliss

Commanders
- Notable commanders: George Windle Read

The 15th Cavalry Division was a cavalry division of the United States Army during World War I, the only United States cavalry division formed during the war.

It was created with three cavalry brigades between November 1917 and February 1918 in Texas and Arizona, and included the Regular Army cavalry regiments that had guarded the Mexico–United States border. The division was originally trained for deployment to Europe, but only two of its regiments were sent there. The division was inactivated on 12 May 1918 and its remaining units sent back to the border as replacement National Army regiments were considered insufficiently trained. Elements of the division were reconstituted as the 1st Cavalry Division in 1921.

== History ==
The organization of the division was ordered by the United States War Department on 27 November 1917 from the nine Regular Army cavalry regiments guarding the Mexico–United States border, in response to the desire of American Expeditionary Forces (AEF) commander on the Western Front General John J. Pershing for a mobile cavalry reserve despite French and British suggestions against establishing such a unit. Under the command of Major General George Windle Read from 10 December, the division was intended to be sent to the AEF, and began forming in early December. The divisional headquarters was organized at Fort Bliss, Texas, the headquarters of the 1st Cavalry Brigade at Fort Sam Houston, Texas, that of the 2nd Cavalry Brigade at Fort Bliss, and that of the 3rd Cavalry Brigade at Douglas, Arizona. The three cavalry brigades were authorized 14,268 combatants and non-combatants, out of the total division strength (including support units) of 18,176.

A United States Signal Corps-produced film including footage of cavalry training at Forts Sill and Sam Houston, 1917–1918

For the next several months, the division conducted methodical training by concentrating two out of three regiments in each brigade, with the third regiment periodically rotating off border duty. When it left the border, the division was intended to be replaced on border duty by new National Army cavalry regiments, then in the process of organization. The organization of the division was completed in February 1918 with the organization of the 1st Cavalry Brigade headquarters, and the 6th, 7th, 14th, and 15th Cavalry Regiments were alerted for deployment to the AEF in response to a request from Pershing for corps troops. However, only the 6th and 15th Cavalry were sent to the AEF via Camp Merritt, New Jersey on 4 March.

Brigadier General DeRosey Caroll Cabell became commanding general on 30 April, and commanded it for the rest of its brief existence. The Commanding General of the Southern Department, Major General Willard Ames Holbrook, proposed that the division be broken up on 6 May 1918, as he considered the National Army regiments insufficiently trained to be able to replace the Regulars within nine months, and the divisional organization unwieldy for border patrol duty. In response, the War Department disbanded the division on 12 May; its subordinate units remained on the border. Pershing was informed by Secretary of War Newton D. Baker that all remaining cavalrymen were required for border duty, ending the possibility of employing a cavalry division on the Western Front. The brigade headquarters remained active in the border until they were demobilized in July 1919.

== Perpetuation ==
The 1st Cavalry Division was constituted in the Regular Army on 20 August 1921 and was activated on 13 September 1921. It was formed from two of the three reconstituted cavalry brigades that were formerly part of the 15th Cavalry Division. Only the 1st and 2nd Brigades were part of the 1st Cavalry Division because of a reduced table of organization for the cavalry division developed after the war; the 3rd Cavalry Brigade (3rd Brigade, 15th Cavalry Division) became part of the new 2nd Cavalry Division.
