= Samuel Baldwin Marks Young =

1st Chief of Staff of the United States Army

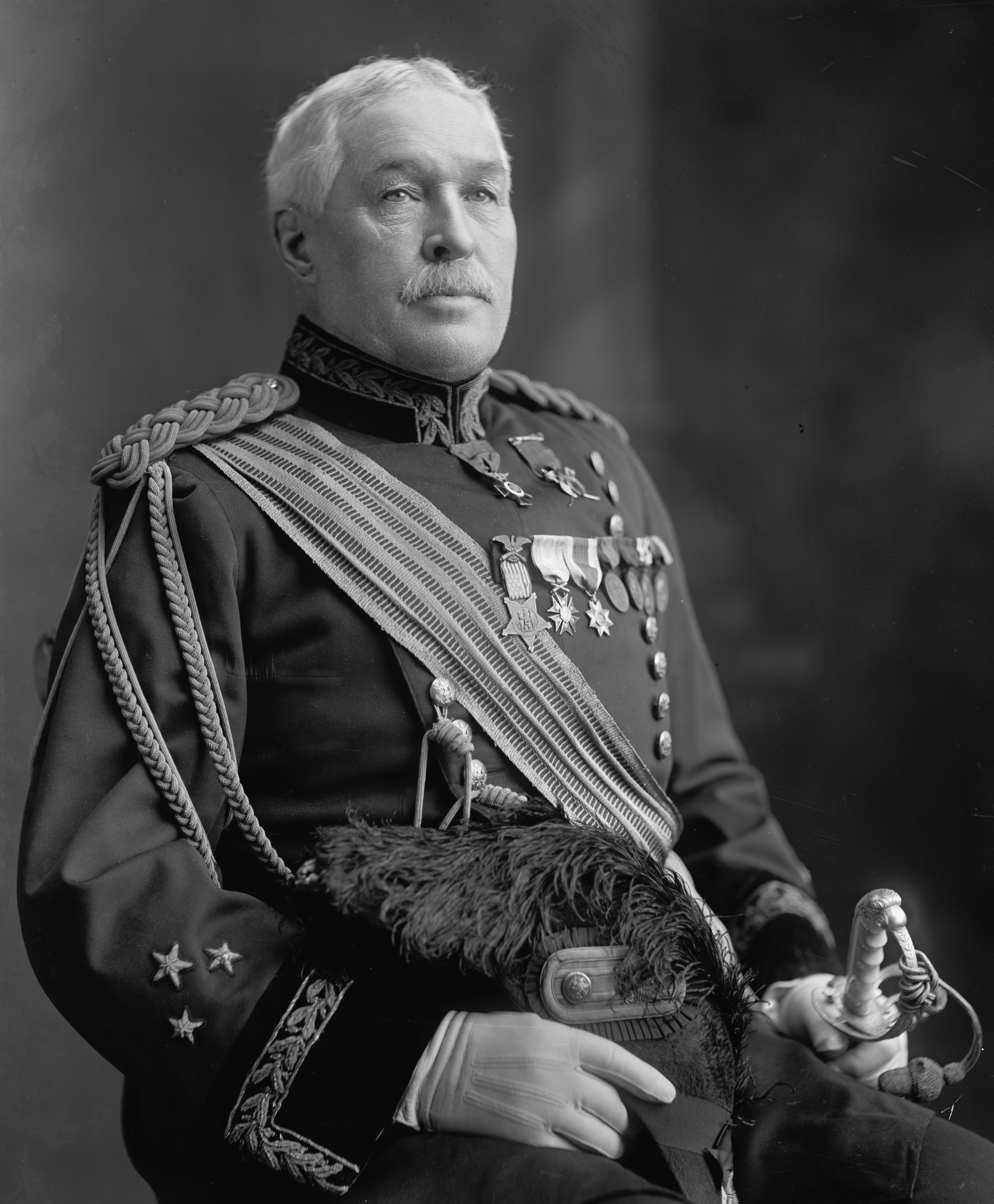
- Young, 1905–1924

Chief of Staff of the United States Army
- In office 15 August 1903 – 8 January 1904
- Preceded by: office established
- Succeeded by: Adna R. Chaffee

Personal details
- Born: January 9, 1840 Pittsburgh, Pennsylvania, US
- Died: September 1, 1924 (aged 84) Helena, Montana, US
- Resting place: Arlington National Cemetery

Military service
- Allegiance: Union; United States
- Branch/service: Union Army; United States Army
- Years of service: 1861–1904
- Rank: Lieutenant general
- Commands: Chief of Staff of the United States Army
- Battles/wars: American Civil War; American Indian Wars; Spanish–American War; Philippine–American War

Samuel Baldwin Marks Young (January 9, 1840 – September 1, 1924) was a United States Army general. He also served as the first president of Army War College between 1902 and 1903. He then served from 1903 until 1904 as the first Chief of Staff of the United States Army.

== Biography ==
Young was born in Pittsburgh, Pennsylvania, to John Young Jr. and Hannah Scott Young. He was educated at Jefferson College (now Washington & Jefferson College) and married Margaret McFadden in 1861.

On the outbreak of the Civil War, he joined the 12th Pennsylvania Infantry in April 1861 as a private. After the expiration of his term he was commissioned captain, 4th Pennsylvania Cavalry in September. He served with distinction in the Army of the Potomac throughout the war, receiving promotion to major in September 1862, to lieutenant colonel in October 1864 and to colonel in December 1864. Young was wounded four times in 1864 and 1865. He served in brigade command in the cavalry corps during the last days of the Appomattox Campaign. He was mustered out of the volunteers on July 1, 1865.

After the war, Young joined the Military Order of the Loyal Legion of the United States—a military society for officers who had served the Union in the Civil War. He was also a member of the Society of the Army of the Potomac.

After the Civil War, he rejoined the Regular Army as a first lieutenant in May 1866. He was promoted to captain of the 8th Cavalry in July 1866. On December 11, 1866, President Andrew Johnson nominated Young for appointment to the brevet rank of brigadier general of volunteers, to rank from April 9, 1865, in recognition for his services in the Siege of Petersburg and the Appomattox Campaign. The U.S. Senate confirmed the appointment on February 6, 1867.

Young served with distinction throughout the Indian Wars and was regularly promoted (to major in 1883 and to lieutenant colonel in 1892), rising to the rank of colonel of the 3rd Cavalry in 1897.

On the commencement of hostilities with Spain, he was promoted to brigadier general of volunteers in May 1898. In Cuba during the war, he commanded one of two cavalry brigades that were part of the Cavalry Division under Major General Joseph Wheeler. Young's brigade included Theodore Roosevelt's Rough Riders, the 1st US Volunteer Cavalry Regiment. In July 1898, after the American victory of the Battle of San Juan Hill, Young assumed command of the Wheeler's Cavalry Division and was made major general of volunteers while he commanded that same division in Cuba after the Santiago Campaign of the Spanish–American War.

That same year, Young became a Veteran Companion of the Missouri Commandery of the Military Order of Foreign Wars. Young was also a companion of the Military Order of the Loyal Legion of the United States, the Grand Army of the Republic and the Society of the Army of the Potomac.

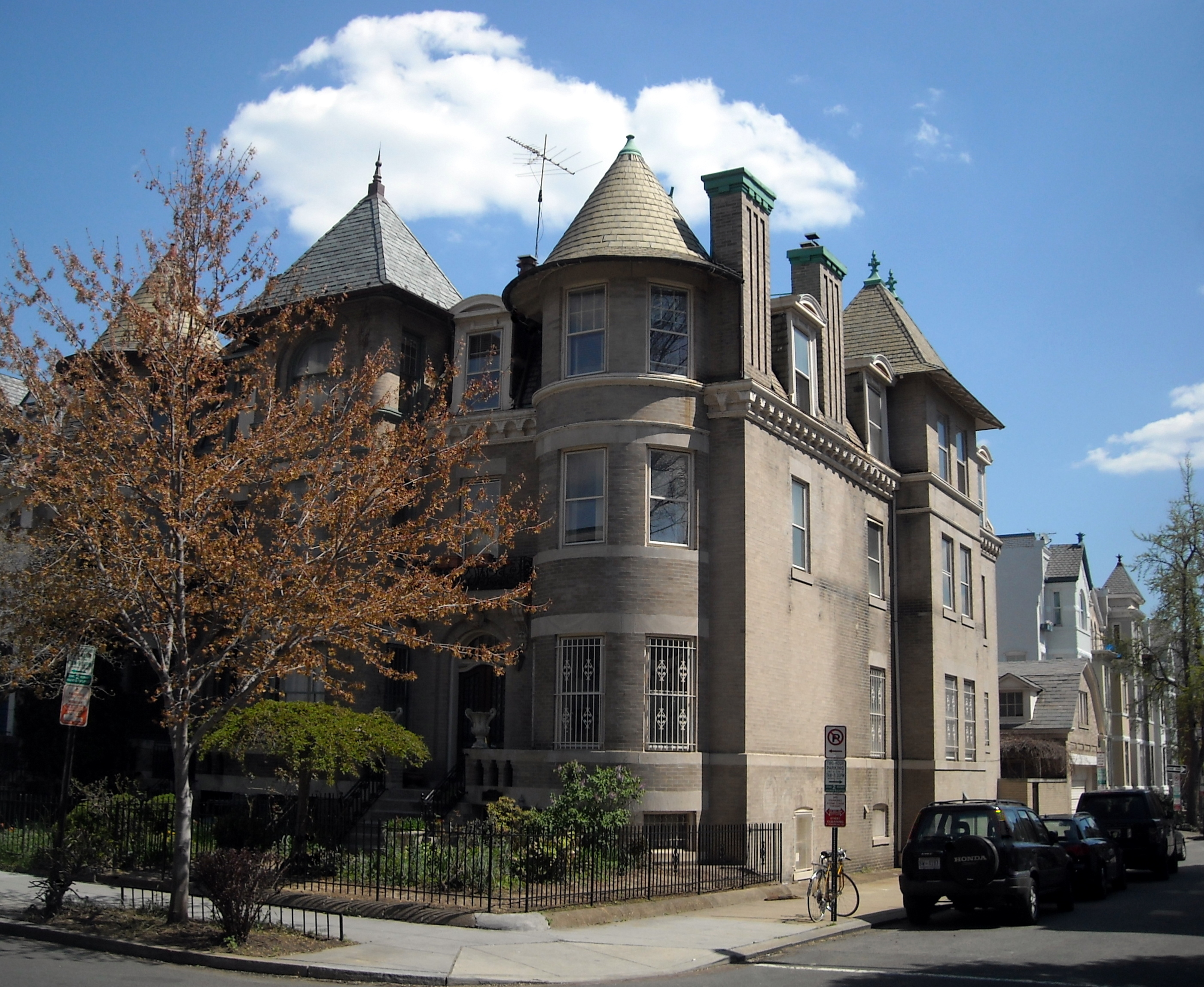
Young's former residence in the Dupont Circle neighborhood of Washington, D.C.

During the Philippine–American War, he returned to the rank of brigadier general of volunteers and commanded brigades in the Northern Luzon District, of which he was made military governor.

From February 1901 to March 1902, he commanded the military district of California from the Presidio of San Francisco. Under the new General Staff System, he was appointed as the first chief of staff of the General Staff in August 1903, a position he held until retirement in January 1904.

From 1909 to 1910, he was president of the board of inquiry that investigated the alleged riot of black soldiers of the 25th U.S. Infantry at Brownsville, Texas, August 13, 1906, and affirmed the subsequent dishonorable discharge of 159 men by order of President Theodore Roosevelt.

As Acting Superintendent of Yellowstone National Park at Fort Yellowstone in 1897 (after a stint in the same role at Yosemite in 1896), Colonel Young introduced fish conservation measures. In 1907, after his retirement, he was appointed full Superintendent by the Secretary of the Interior. He served as full Superintendent for two years. He died at his house in Helena, Montana, and was honored with a state funeral in Washington, D.C., and was buried in Arlington National Cemetery.

== Family ==
Samuel and Margaret Young were the parents of seven children, six daughters and a son: Edith (1865–1940); Burton (called Hannah) (1866–1944); Lillian (1868–1956); Marjorie (1872–1956); Eliza (1880–1883); Ranald Mackenzie (1880–1882); and Elizabeth (1883–1966).

In 1886, his daughter Burton (Hannah) married George Windle Read, who attained the rank of major general and was a division and corps commander of the American Expeditionary Force during World War I. Their children included Burton Young Read (1889–1981), a career soldier who served from the early 1900s through World War II before retiring as a colonel, and George Windle Read Jr., a career soldier who served in both world wars and attained the rank of lieutenant general as commander of the US Army Armor Center and the Second United States Army.

In 1886, his daughter Edith became the wife of army officer John Thornton Knight. Their son, John Thornton Knight, Jr. (1894–1989), was awarded the Distinguished Service Cross for extraordinary heroism in action while serving in France during World War I.

In 1901, his daughter Marjorie married army surgeon John Heysham Gibbon, the nephew of Civil War and Indian War commander John Gibbon. John H. and Marjorie Gibbon were the parents of John Heysham Gibbon.

In 1903, Young's daughter Elizabeth became the wife of Army officer John Robert Rigby Hannay.

In 1913, his daughter Lillian, who had become active in the Christian Science church, married Eugene R. Cox (1856–1921), a Chicago attorney and businessman who later relocated to New York and also played a prominent role in the operations of the Christian Science church.

== Awards ==
- Civil War Campaign Medal
- Indian Campaign Medal
- Spanish Campaign Medal
- Philippine Campaign Medal

== Dates of rank ==
Insignia	Rank	Date	Component
No insignia	Private	25 April 1861	Volunteers
	Captain	6 September 1861	Volunteers
	Major	20 September 1862	Volunteers
	Lieutenant colonel	1 May 1864	Volunteers
	Colonel	25 June 1864	Volunteers
	Brevet brigadier general	9 April 1865	Volunteers
	First lieutenant	11 May 1866	Regular Army
	Captain	28 July 1866	Regular Army
	Major	2 April 1883	Regular Army
	Lieutenant colonel	16 August 1892	Regular Army
	Colonel	19 June 1897	Regular Army
	Brigadier general	4 May 1898	Volunteers
	Major general	8 July 1898	Volunteers
	Brigadier general	2 January 1900	Regular Army
	Major general	2 February 1901	Regular Army
	Lieutenant general	8 August 1903	Regular Army

== Legacy ==
In February 1942, the Army assigned George S. Patton Jr. to establish a Desert Training Center. He selected a site in the Sonoran and Mohave Deserts straddling southern California and western Arizona. The headquarters at present-day Chiriaco Summit, California was named Camp Young in his honor. The training center included eight additional divisional camps in California and four more in Arizona.

== Notes ==
Military offices
Preceded by None; Nelson A. Miles (Commanding General of the United States Army)	Chief of Staff of the United States Army; 1903–1904	Succeeded by Adna Chaffee
