= United States Army Cavalry School =

The United States Army Cavalry School was part of a series of training programs and centers for its horse mounted troops or cavalry branch.

== History ==
In 1838, a Cavalry School of Practice was established at Carlisle Barracks, Pennsylvania, which in time also became the Army's recruiting center for new mounted recruits. Commanded by Edwin Vose Sumner, the program was started from scratch.

The close association between field artillery and mounted units began with the location of the Army's light artillery, also in Carlisle, in 1839. Captain Samuel Ringgold trained his recruits and tested equipment for the "flying artillery", as it was called, and gained fame during the Mexican–American War.

Beginning in the 1880s, the U.S. Army reestablished schools to provide intensive training in military specialties. The first of these was the School of Application for Infantry and Cavalry, founded at Fort Leavenworth, Kansas in 1881 by William Tecumseh Sherman. For graduates of the United States Military Academy, the school allowed practical application of the theories they had learned at the academy. Here, also, student officers detailed from the field improved their knowledge of their profession. In 1901, the school was expanded into the General Service and Staff College and opened to officers of all branches; today, it is the Command and General Staff College

In 1887, the U.S. Congress appropriated $200,000 for a school at Fort Riley, Kansas, to instruct enlisted men in cavalry and light artillery, but five years went by before the Cavalry and Light Artillery School was formally established and moved from Fort Leavenworth. The Fort Riley post hospital, built in 1855, was remodeled in 1890 and became the headquarters and home for the school. In the years that followed, the school changed names. It was called the Mounted Service School from 1907 until World War I, when instruction ended for the duration of the war. In 1919, the Cavalry School took its place and continued until October 1946. With the final disposition of tactical cavalry horses in March 1947, the Army ended all training and educational programs dealing with mounted troops.

With the closure of the cavalry school, a new educational function continued on 1 November 1946 at Fort Riley with the Ground General School, training newly commissioned officers in basic military subjects. After 1950, it continued as the Army General School until May 1955, when Fort Riley's education and training mission ended as it became the headquarters for the U.S. 1st Infantry Division.

== U.S. Cavalry Museum ==
In 1957, Building 205, the former home of the Cavalry School became the U.S. Cavalry Museum, telling the story of this branch of service from the American Revolution to the 1950s.

== See also ==
- U.S. Army Remount Service
- United States Army Infantry School
