= George Windle Read =

United States Army general

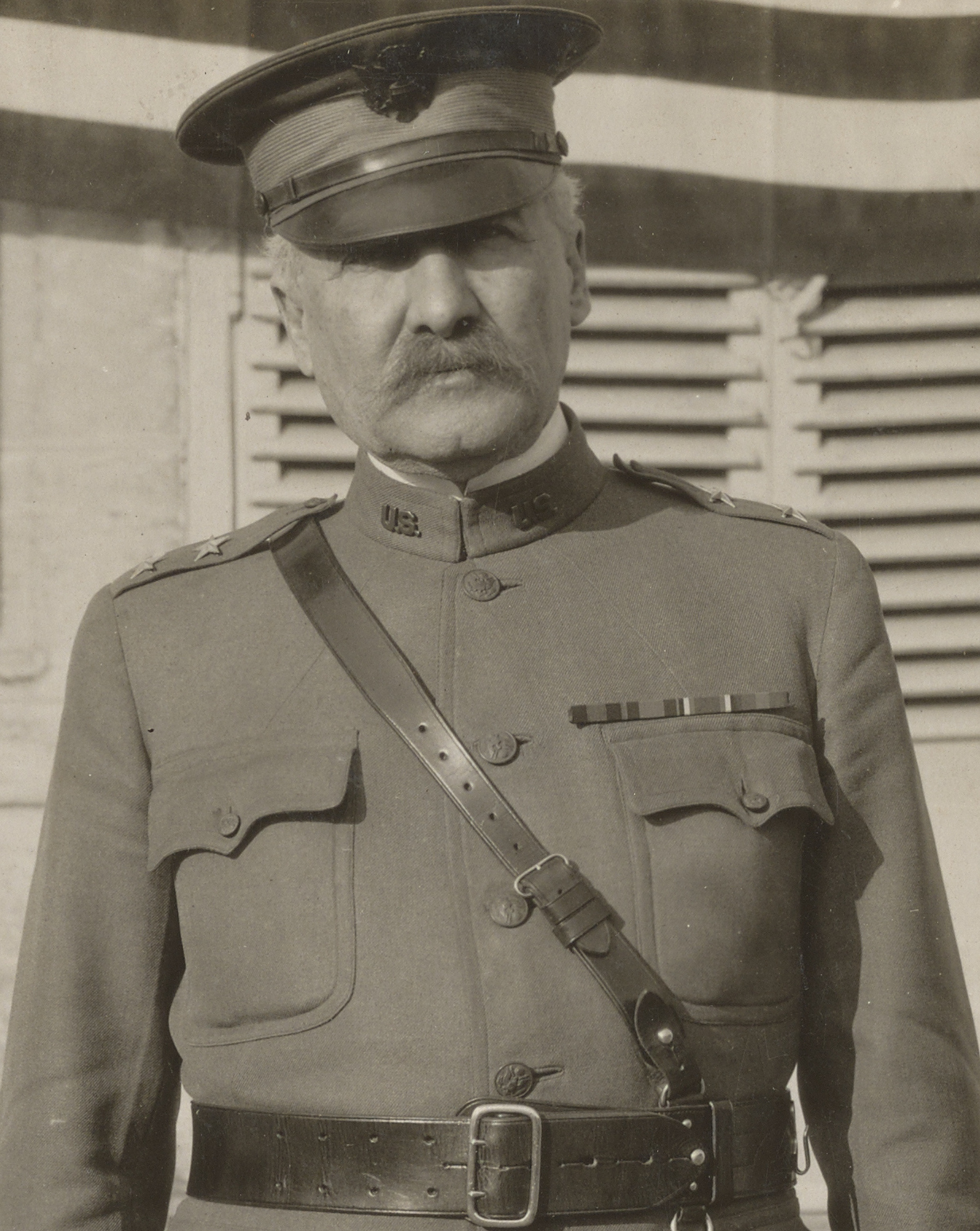
- Born: November 19, 1860; Indianola, Iowa, United States
- Died: November 6, 1934 (aged 73); Washington, D.C., United States
- Burial place: Arlington National Cemetery, Virginia, United States
- Military career
- Allegiance: United States
- Branch: United States Army
- Service years: 1883–1925
- Rank: Major General
- Units: Infantry Branch; Cavalry Branch
- Commands: 152nd Depot Brigade; 77th Infantry Division; 15th Cavalry Division; 30th Division; II Corps; American Embarkation Center, Le Havre, France; 42nd Infantry Division; V Corps; Philippine Department
- Conflicts: Spanish–American War; Pancho Villa Expedition; World War I
- Awards: Army Distinguished Service Medal

Major General George Windle Read (November 19, 1860 – November 6, 1934) was a senior United States Army officer who was prominent as a corps and division commander in World War I. Read also oversaw the departure of US forces from Europe at the end of the war as commander of the American Embarkation Center at Le Havre, France.

== Early life ==
Read was born in Indianola, Iowa, the son of James C. Read and Elizabeth Snell (Windle) Read. He graduated from the United States Military Academy (USMA) at West Point, New York, in 1883 and was commissioned as a second lieutenant of Infantry.

== Early military career ==
Read's initial assignments were in the American West, and his first posting was with the 16th Infantry Regiment. A few months later he transferred to the 5th Cavalry Regiment, with which he served until 1889.

From 1889 to 1893, Read was Assistant Professor of Military Science at the University of Iowa, after which he returned to the 5th Cavalry Regiment in Texas.

In 1898, Read authored The Automatic Instructor: A Practical System for Home Study.

== Spanish–American War ==
At the start of the Spanish–American War Read was assigned to an Ordnance unit, with which he served in Cuba until 1899. Receiving promotion to captain, he served in New Mexico from 1901 to 1902, after which he was assigned to the Philippines.

== Post-Spanish–American War ==
After leaving Cuba, Read served in California and Hawaii. From 1905 to 1909 he served on the Army's General Staff. Promoted to major, he served in Cuba, Puerto Rico and the Philippines before attending the Army War College, from which he graduated in 1914.

== Mexican border conflict ==
Advanced to lieutenant colonel after his war college graduation, Read served in Texas and Arizona during the US–Mexico border conflict, including the Pancho Villa Expedition. From 1915 to 1917 Read again served in Washington, D.C., as a member of the Army General Staff.

== World War I ==
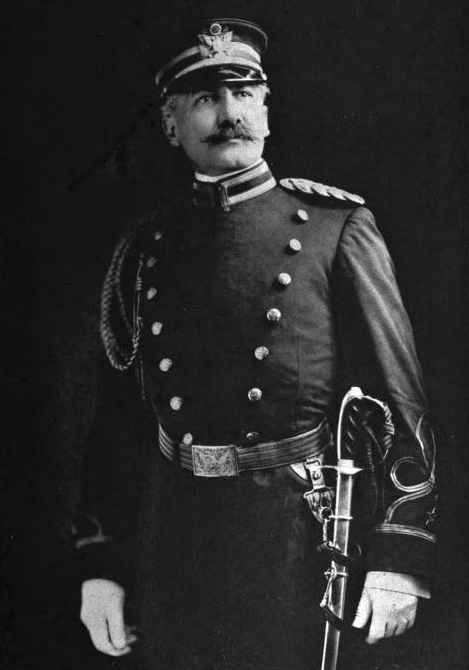
Read as commander of II Corps.

In April, 1917, Read (now a colonel) was appointed to head recruiting as the army began to mobilize for World War I. In August he was selected to command the 152nd Depot Brigade at Camp Upton, New York. In December Read was promoted to temporary major general and assigned to command first the 77th Infantry Division, and then the 15th Cavalry Division in El Paso, Texas.

The 15th Cavalry Division was disbanded in favor of fielding all infantry divisions, and in April, 1918 Read took command of the 30th Infantry Division, which he led to France. In June he was selected by General John J. Pershing, Commander-in-Chief (C-in-C) of the American Expeditionary Forces (AEF) on the Western Front, to command the II Corps, consisting of five divisions assigned to the British sector of the Western Front. After three of his divisions were transferred to take part in the Saint-Mihiel Offensive, Read continued to command the other two divisions, which were attached to the Australian Corps in the Ypres sector, and participated in the Hundred Days Offensive (August–November 1918) that breached the Hindenburg Line.

Read continued to command the II Corps after the Armistice. After the organization was demobilized in February, 1919 Read was assigned to command of the American Embarkation Center at Le Havre, France, where he was responsible for arranging the transportation of men and materiel back to the United States. He was also the final commander of the 42nd Infantry Division as it completed post-war occupation duty in Germany and prepared to depart Europe.

For his services during the war Read received numerous awards and decorations, which included the Army Distinguished Service Medal and the British Order of the Bath. The citation for his Army DSM states the following:

The President of the United States of America, authorized by Act of Congress, July 9, 1918, takes pleasure in presenting the Army Distinguished Service Medal to Major General George Windle Read, United States Army, for exceptionally meritorious and distinguished services to the Government of the United States, in a duty of great responsibility during World War I. General Read Commanded with distinction the 30th Division, and organized and Commanded the 2d Army Corps in its operations with the British forces in France. He displayed qualities of leadership and professional attainments of a high order, and to his efforts are largely due the brilliant success achieved.

In addition, he received the French Legion of Honor (Commander), and French Croix de Guerre with Palm.

== Post–World War I ==
In May, 1919, Read was assigned to command the US V Corps at Camp Jackson, South Carolina, with the permanent rank of brigadier general. In March, 1921 he received permanent promotion to major general.

In October, 1922, Read was appointed commander of the Philippine Department. He assumed command in early 1923, and remained in this assignment until his 1925 retirement.

== Retirement and death ==
In retirement Read resided in Upper Providence Township, Pennsylvania. He died at Walter Reed Army Hospital, shortly before his 74th birthday, on November 6, 1934, and was buried at Arlington National Cemetery, Section South, Site 1819.

== Personal ==
In 1886, Read married Burton Young (1868–1944) in a ceremony that took place in El Paso. She was the daughter of General S.B.M Young, who served as the first Army Chief of Staff. Their children included Burton Young Read (1889–1981), a career soldier who served from the early 1900s through World War II before retiring as a colonel, and George Windle Read Jr., a career soldier who served in both world wars and attained the rank of lieutenant general as commander of the US Army Armor Center and the Second United States Army.

== Bibliography ==
- Borrowed Soldiers: Americans Under British Command, 1918. 2008. University of Oklahoma Press. ISBN 9780806139197 OCLC 171287665

Military offices
Preceded by Newly created position	Commanding General 152nd Depot Brigade; August, 1917–December, 1917	Succeeded by John E. Woodward
Preceded by J. Franklin Bell	Commanding General 77th Infantry Division; December, 1917–December, 1917	Succeeded by Evan M. Johnson
Preceded by Newly created position	Commanding General 15th Cavalry Division; December, 1917–April, 1918	Succeeded by DeRosey Caroll Cabell
Preceded by Samson L. Faison	Commanding General 30th Infantry Division; May 3, 1918–June 12, 1918	Succeeded by Robert Houston Noble
Preceded by Robert Houston Noble	Commanding General 30th Infantry Division; June 14, 1918–June 15, 1918	Succeeded by Samson L. Faison
Preceded by George S. Simonds (acting)	Commanding General II Corps; June 15, 1918–February 1, 1919	Succeeded by None
Preceded by None	Commanding General American Embarkation Center; Le Havre, France; February 2, 1919–April 10, 1919	Succeeded by None
Preceded by Clement Flagler	Commanding General 42nd Infantry Division; April 10, 1919–May 9, 1919	Succeeded by None
Preceded by Charles Pelot Summerall	Commanding General V Corps; May 10, 1919–October 3, 1922	Succeeded by None
Preceded by William M. Wright	Commanding General Philippine Department; October 4, 1922–November 19, 1924	Succeeded by James H. McRae
