= John Wilson Ruckman =

United States Army general

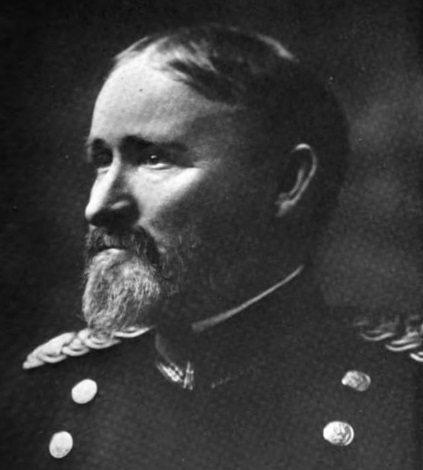
- From 1922's Fifty-third Annual Report of the Association of Graduates of the United States Military Academy
- Born: October 10, 1858; Sidney, Illinois, U.S.
- Died: June 6, 1921 (aged 62); Brookline, Massachusetts, U.S.
- Burial place: United States Military Academy Cemetery
- Military career
- Allegiance: United States of America
- Branch: United States Army
- Service years: 1883–1921
- Rank: Major General
- Commands: Southeastern Department; Southern Department; Northeastern Department
- Awards: Distinguished Service Medal

John Wilson Ruckman (October 10, 1858 – June 6, 1921) was a major general in the United States Army.

== Early life ==
Ruckman was born at Deers, Illinois, a flag-station just southeast of the University of Illinois. Biographies, however, usually list his place of birth as Sidney, Illinois (Champaign County). His parents, Thomas and Mary O'Brien Ruckman, were farmers. His uncles, John W. and Wilson Ruckman served the Union Army with distinction in the American Civil War (Company A, Illinois 35th Infantry).

After three semesters at the University of Illinois, Ruckman was appointed from the 14th Congressional District of Illinois for acceptance to the United States Military Academy. His nomination was made by Republican Congressman Joseph Cannon.

== Career ==
Ruckman's Coast Artillery Uniform

Ruckman graduated from West Point (1883), the U.S. Artillery School (1892), the U.S. Army War College (1915), and the U.S. Naval War College (1916).

Ruckman was assigned to Fort Hamilton, New York (1883–1890) and developed a friendship with Tasker Bliss. From 1881 to 1899, he served at Fort Monroe where he and four other officers of the Artillery School founded the Journal of the United States Artillery in 1892. He also served as the Editor of the Journal for four years (July 1892 to January 1896) and had several of his articles published. One publication by West Point notes Ruckman's "guidance" and "first-rate quality" work were obvious as the Journal "rose to high rank among the service papers of the world." The Journal was renamed the Coast Artillery Journal in 1922 and the Antiaircraft Journal in 1948. He invented several artillery devices that were critical in World War I.

After serving a brief stint at Fort Slocum, Ruckman was sent to Havana, Cuba, then made Instructor at the School of Submarine Defense (Fort Totten, New York). While developing courses on chemistry and explosives, he developed a friendship with Arthur L. Wagner.

In 1906, Ruckman was assigned to the Presidio of San Francisco, and given command of Fort Baker. In 1911, his command was transferred to Fort Mills, Corregidor, where he distinguished himself by successfully withstanding a siege. In 1916, he was assigned to organize and command the 5th Provisional Coast Artillery Regiment at Del Rio, Texas and given command of El Paso Rio Grande and the district of Laredo.

Ruckman served as Commander of the Southeastern Department (Aug 1917) Southern Department (Sept 1917) and the Northeastern Department (May 1918).

Ruckman's life was not without controversy. Although he ranked high in his graduating class, he was held back one year at West Point for laughing during artillery drills and "in other inappropriate places." In 1896, he suggested that a regiment of soldiers in Cleveland, Ohio, be abolished because of its relationship to prostitutes. In his 1915 Naval War College thesis, Ruckman called for universal military service and the education of "all boys and young men" in the use of firearms. He also recommended strict guidelines for the content of history texts in schools and colleges.

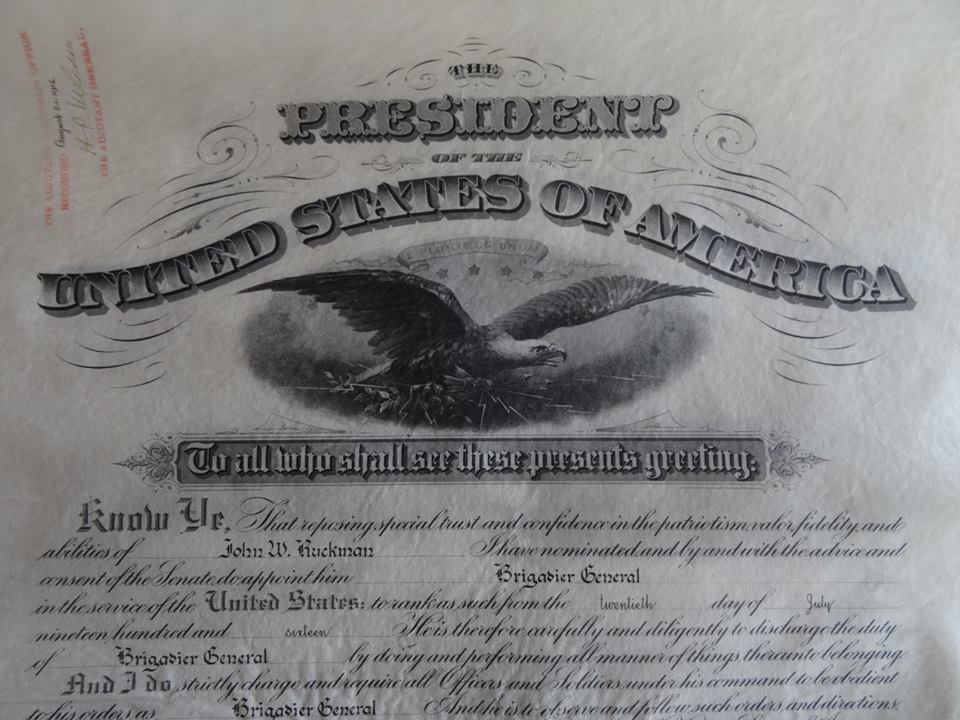
Ruckman's Brigadier General Military Commission

Ruckman served as Commander of the Southern Department in the direct aftermath of the Houston Riot (1917). The riot resulted in 63 African-American soldiers being put on trial. After the trial proceedings ended on November 30, Ruckman kept the verdicts and sentences secret including for 13 sentenced to hanged. Ruckman ordered for the executions to occur on December 11 without a review by President Woodrow Wilson and without an opportunity for the soldiers to file an appeal. Ruckman's hastiness to execute African-American soldiers in secret sparked outrage and led the Department of War to amend General Order No. 7 to state that no death sentence could be carried out by a military court inside the territorial boundaries of the United States until reviewed personally by the president. Although his decision-making was supported by Woodrow Wilson (in a public statement), Ruckman was quietly relieved of command in May 1918, reduced in rank to a brigadier general, and not posted with the American Expeditionary Force in Europe. His actions were also scrutinized in the congressional Military Justice Hearings of 1919. In 1918, he distributed a scathing circular to members of the Texas State legislature and lobbied on behalf of a bill that would ban the teaching of German in public schools.

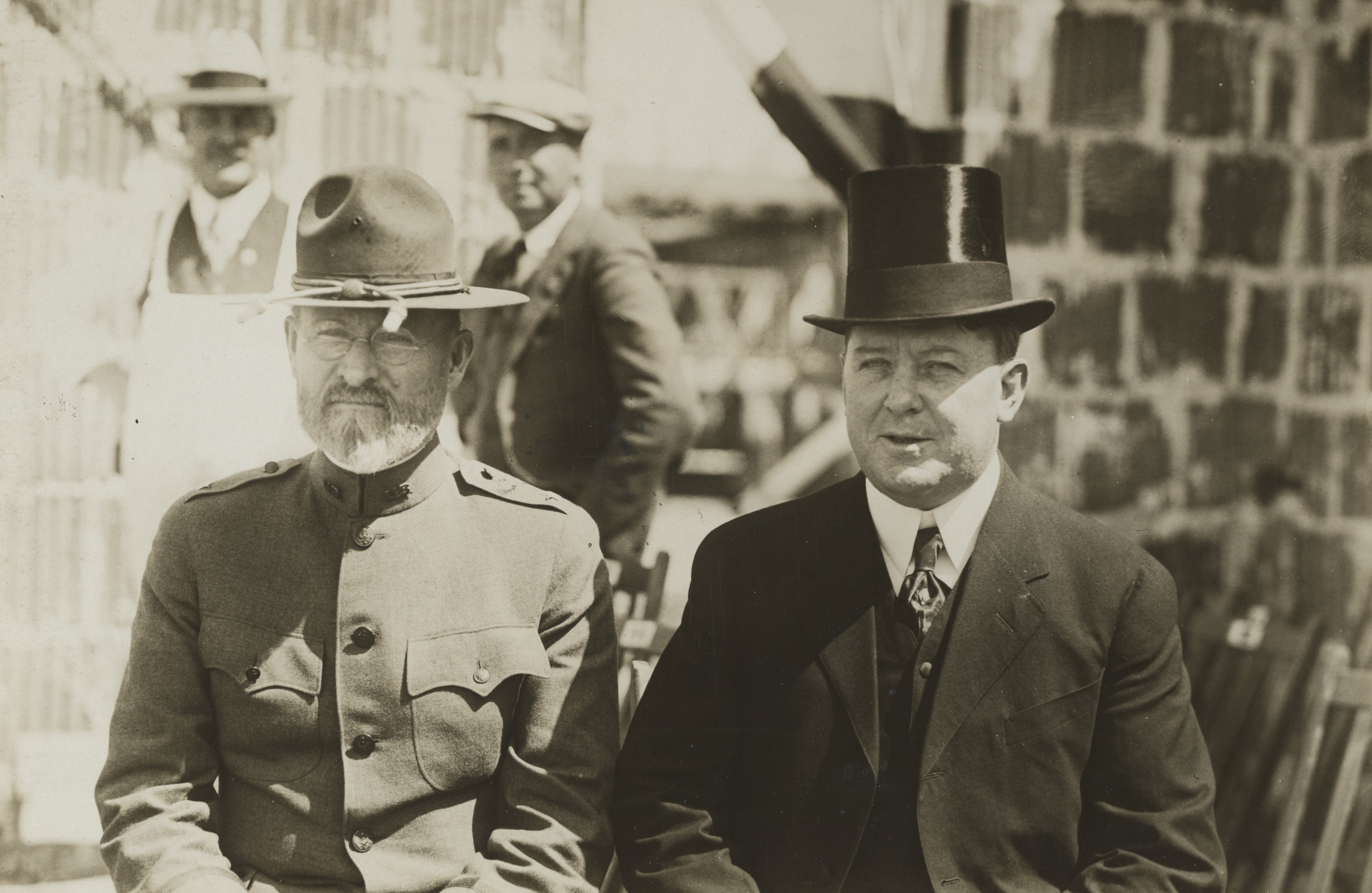
Brigadier General Ruckman and Grand Exalted Ruler Fred Harper at Elks' corner stone laying of hospital for wounded soldiers and sailors in Boston, 1918

In 1920, Ruckman engaged in a very public dispute with Charles W. Eliot of Harvard regarding the quality of military education in the United States. In 1921, Ruckman suggested in a public speech that immigrants be required to serve for a period of time in the military in order to enhance the "Americanization" process. He also made national headlines that year by refusing to allow soldiers under his command to march in Boston's St. Patrick's Day parade (a decision supported by the Secretary of War).

Ruckman was the only individual to command three of the six designated interior military Departments in the United States (Northeast, Southeast and Southern).

== Awards ==
Ruckman received the Army Distinguished Service Medal posthumously.

His citation reads:

Brigadier General John W. Ruckman, United States Army deceased. For exceptionally meritorious and conspicuous services as Department Commander, Southern Department, between August 30, 1917, and May 9, 1918, and Department Commander, Northeastern Department, between May 23, 1918, and July 20, 1918. He handled many difficult problems arising in these departments with rare judgment, tact and great skill.

== Personal life and family ==
He married May Hamilton, the daughter of American Civil War Colonel John Hamilton.

Ruckman's only son, John Hamilton Ruckman, was a graduate of M.I.T. and the University of California, a veteran of World Wars I and II and a chief engineer on the Manhattan Project. John Wilson Ruckman is also the grandfather of Peter Sturges Ruckman an independent Baptist minister and founder of the Pensacola Bible Institute, and the great-grandfather of P.S. Ruckman Jr., a professor of political science.

== Death ==
General Ruckman died in 1921 and was buried at West Point. Pallbearers included two major generals, a retired brigadier general and five colonels. The U.S. Military Academy Band and a Detachment of Field Music furnished music and a detachment of field artillery fired eleven-minute guns as the cortege left the chapel. A salute of eleven guns also followed three volleys of musketry over the grave.

The military reservation at Nahant, Massachusetts, was renamed "Fort Ruckman." Today, streets are also named in Ruckman's honor at the Presidio of San Francisco, in Fort Monroe, Virginia, and in Fort Bliss, Texas. A granite column also bears his name at the University of Illinois' Memorial Stadium.

=== Dates of rank ===
Second Lieutenant, Regular Army: June 13, 1883
First Lieutenant, Regular Army: Feb. 20, 1891
Captain, Regular Army: March 31, 1899
Major, Regular Army: June 30, 1906
Lieutenant Colonel, Regular Army: Feb. 2, 1911
Colonel, Regular Army: March 7, 1912
Brigadier General, Regular Army: July 20, 1916
Major General, National Army: Aug 5, 1917
Returned to grade of Brigadier General, Regular Army: May 1, 1918
Major General, Regular Army: June 7, 1921 (Awarded Posthumously)

== Selected writings ==
- "Ballistics: The Wind Problem in Gunnery." 1890. School of Mines Quarterly Text.
- "Artillery Difficulties in the Next War." 1892. Journal of the United States Artillery
- "The Effect of Wind Upon the Motion of a Projectile." 1892. Journal of the United States Artillery
- "Coast Artillery Fire Instruction." 1894. Journal of the United States Artillery
- "Investigation of the Comparative Values of Concentrated and Parallel Methods of Mortar Fire." 1896. Journal of the United States Artillery
- "Are Disappearing Gun Carriages Essential to Our Coast Defense?" 1902. Journal of the Military Service Institution
- "Coast Artillery Practice." 1908. Journal of the United States Artillery
- "The Journal of the U.S. Artillery." 1912. Journal of the United States Artillery
- "Siege of Port Arthur" 1915. Journal of the United States Artillery
- "The Policy of the United States." 1915. Thesis. U.S. Naval War College.
- "Military and Naval Cooperation." 1917. Journal of the United States Artillery Text.
