= Bomford =

Bomford is a surname. Notable people with the surname include:

- Andrew Bomford (born 1974), Australian rules footballer
- Anthony G. Bomford, British engineer and surveyor, after whom Bomford Peak in Antarctica is named
- Benjamin Bomford, 19th-century English farmer
- George Bomford (1780–1848), military officer in the United States Army
- Gerald Bomford (1851–1915), British surgeon
- Guy Bomford (1899–1996), British geodesist
- James Vote Bomford (1811–1892), soldier in the United States military, son of George
- Laurence George Bomford (1847–1926), English painter and clergyman
- Nicholas Bomford (1939–2025), British headmaster

== See also ==
- Bamford (surname)
