= Bamford (surname) =

Bamford is an English surname.

== People ==
Notable people with the surname include:

- Alf Bamford, British disc jockey and record producer
- Anthony Bamford (born 1945), English businessman and chairman of JCB
- Brian Bamford (1935–2021), English golfer
- Carole Bamford (born 1946), British businessperson
- Edward Bamford (1887–1928), English naval captain and recipient of the Victoria Cross
- Frank Ellis Bamford (1865–1932), American army general
- Fred Bamford (1849–1934), Australian politician, Minister for Home and Territories
- Gord Bamford (born 1976), Australian-Canadian singer
- Harry Bamford (1920–1958), English footballer
- Harry Bamford (footballer, born 1886) (1886–1915), English footballer
- Harry Bamford (footballer, born 1914) (1914–1949), English footballer
- James Bamford (born 1946), American author and journalist
- John Bamford (1937–2023), English recipient of the George Cross
- Jo Bamford (born 1977, as Joseph Cyril Edward Bamford), British businessman, grandson of Joseph Cyril Bamford (1916–2001)
- Joseph Cyril Bamford (1916–2001), English businessman
- Joyce Bamford-Addo (born 1937), Ghanaian lawyer and politician
- Maria Bamford (born 1970), American comedian and actress
- Mark Bamford (film director), American writer and director
- Patrick Bamford (born 1993), English footballer
- Robert Bamford (1883–1942), founder of Aston Martin
- Samuel Bamford (1788–1872), English radical reformer and writer
- Scott Bamford (born 1970) Australian Rules Footballer
- Simon Bamford (born–?), English film, television and stage actor.
- Tommy Bamford (1905–1967), Welsh footballer

== Characters ==
- Barry Bamford, a fictional character from the 2010s UK medical soap opera TV show Doctors
- Janet Bamford, a fictional character from UK soap opera TV show Coronation Street during the 1980s
- Phoebe Bamford, a fictional character from the 1990s UK time-travel sitcom TV show Goodnight Sweetheart

== Lists of people ==
- Harry Bamford (disambiguation)
- J. C. Bamford (disambiguation)
- Mark Bamford (disambiguation)

== See also ==
- Bamford (disambiguation)
- Balmford (surname)
- Balmforth (surname)
