= Dodford, Worcestershire =

Village in Worcestershire, England

Coordinates: 52.35°N 2.10°W

Dodford
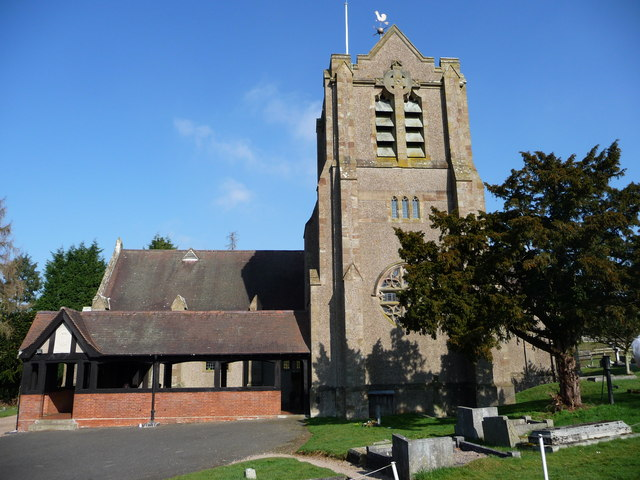
- Holy Trinity and St Mary's church

- Location within Worcestershire
  - London: 122 miles (196 km)
- Civil parish: Dodford with Grafton
- District: Bromsgrove
- Shire county: Worcestershire
- Region: West Midlands
- Country: England
- Sovereign state: United Kingdom
- Post town: BROMSGROVE
- Postcode district: B61
- Dialling code: 01527
- Police: West Mercia
- Fire: Hereford and Worcester
- Ambulance: West Midlands
- UK Parliament: Bromsgrove (UK Parliament constituency)

Dodford is a village in the Bromsgrove district of Worcestershire, England, approximately 3 miles (4.8 km) west of Bromsgrove, officially founded on 2 July 1849 by members of the Chartist movement. It was one of five settlements created in the land scheme and retains a characteristic grid street plan, along with narrow lanes and many plum and pear trees from its market gardening past. The civil parish of Dodford with Grafton had a population of 792 in 2021.

== Medieval and early modern Dodford ==
Dodford was the site of Dodford Priory. Dodford for a time fell within Feckenham Forest, when its boundaries were extended hugely by Henry II, to encompass much of North Worcestershire, including Dodford and Chaddesley Corbett. The area was removed from forest law in 1301 in the reign of Henry III, when the boundaries were moved back.

=== Etymology ===
Place-name scholars argue that it is derived from Old English Dodda’s Ford, although there is no evidence of pre-Norman settlement in the area. Grafton means "settlement at or near the wood" and may indicate a role in woodland management within a larger estate, for instance.

== Notable buildings ==
=== Dodford Priory ===
Dodford Priory was a small Augustine monastery founded in 1184, probably by King Henry II, and held lands around Bromsgrove. It is recorded as owning an advowson (right of appointment) at a Chantry at St. Nicholas Chapel, Elmley Lovett in 1327.

It was not wealthy, earning £4 17s in 1291 according to tax records. By 1464 it was "so near dissolution that for a long time only one canon has remained there" so was ordered by Edward IV to be absorbed into the Premonstratensian monastery of Halesowen.

Revenues increased to be worth £7 from demesne lands and £17 13s. 1d. from rents and woodlands in 1535. It was dissolved in 1536 or 1538.

The site was triangular, measuring 240 by 180 metres, and a moat – or more likely, series of fishponds – is still visible and waterlogged today. Some of the remains are also visible and the listed building on the site may include part of the refectory, in particular "a chamfered pointed doorway" on its south west side.

=== Monsieurs Hall ===
Monsieurs Hall is a 17th-century farmhouse, located on the eponymous lane, off Kidderminster Road.

=== Baptist Chapel and Mission Church ===
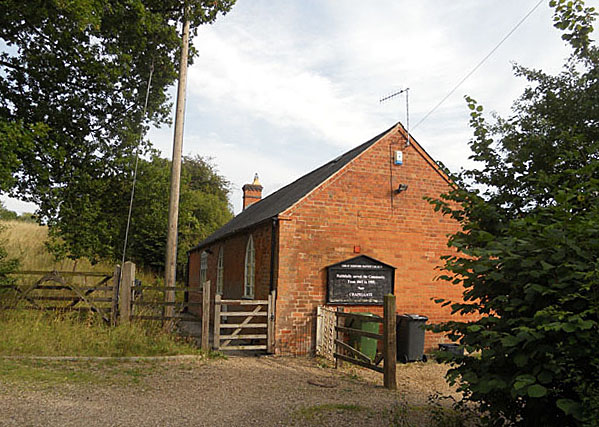
Old chapel Dodford

A Baptist chapel was founded but has now closed. A Mission Church was consecrated in 1863 and stood on the current site of Dodford's village hall.

=== Dodford School ===
Dodford School was founded in 1877. It is now a First School teaching children from across Bromsgrove to the age of nine.

=== Church of the Holy Trinity and St Mary ===
The Church was built in 1907–1908 with money donated by the curate of St John’s Church Bromsgrove Walter Whinfield. The architect was Arthur Bartlett who constructed it in the Arts and Crafts style, with decoration work created by the Bromsgrove Guild. Bartlett was recommended by Walter Gilbert. Much of the woodcarving, including the pulpit, altar rails and organ case is credited to Celestino Pancheri.

Its listing document states: "The church is one of the best of its date in the county. Its plan form and tower are of an unusual and most effective design and the understated but thorough attention to the decorative detail of the interior is particularly interesting". Simon Jenkins relates that the ceiling ribs represent "the fruits of Dodford" and the front bench-end features "John Bungay, the first child born in the Chartist village in 1849".

== Chartist Dodford ==
The Chartist movement set up the Chartist Co-operative Land Society in 1845 to settle working-class families on four, three and two acre plots, where it was hoped they would be able to make a reasonable income. Around 70,000 members paid subscriptions in the hope of gaining a plot, which were allocated by the drawing of ballots. Five settlements were made, at Herringsgate, Minster Lovell, Snig's End, Lowbands, Redmarley d'Abitot and lastly, Great Dodford.

Chartist leader Feargus O'Connor bought the site of Dodford Priory and 273 adjacent acres from a wealthy local farmer Benjamin Bomford for £10,546 (2011: £734,000) in January 1848, hoping to settle 70 families. Equipment and horses were moved from Snig's End to prepare the site that summer. 5,000 Midlands Chartists met at Dodford in July, where O'Connor assured them that the settlement would be completed, despite interference from a Parliamentary select committee and a "lying and slandering press".

The Select Committee ruled that allocating plots by ballot was a violation of the Lottery Acts, so allocation of plots at Dodford was made to those who paid the largest advance deposits:

members would in effect have to outbid each other to gain plots. O'Connor proposed this system reluctantly and really wanted one that would be legal and at the same time would not rule out the acquisition of plots by the "blistered hands, fustian jackets, and un-shorn chins."

'Location Day', when settlers were welcomed to their new plots, was 2 July 1849. Unlike other 'Location Days' it was not celebrated in the Chartist Northern Star, which instead began to print the complaints of settlers. The settlement's 44 plots were ill-prepared, with open wells and no water pumps. Crops of wheat had not been planted:

The first year at Dodford was very hard for the settlers: one of them, John Wallace, said that they had had only dry bread to eat. For some years afterwards they did badly too, growing cereals and potatoes. Many supported themselves at their old trades, at home or in Bromsgrove, and hired labourers to work their plots.

The company – now known as the national Land Company – was dissolved, in part because no rents were paid from Dodford residents. The tenants were given the chance to buy out the ground and avoid rent, or to continue paying it to a new owner.

Chartists from the West Midlands lent practical help with tools and regular visits in the early, difficult years. A special 'Dodford digging fork' was made in Stourbridge to deal with heavy red soil.

However, unlike other Chartists settlements, which continued to do badly, largely because the plots were too small, Dodford could access the growing Birmingham and Black Country markets.

John Wallace realized that with careful treatment the heavy soil was suitable for the cultivation of strawberries and other market-garden crops: early in the 1860s their growing was begun at his suggestion. From then until about 1920 strawberries were the staple crop at Dodford; 'Joseph Paxton' was the favourite variety.

The small holders sold market garden products, particularly strawberries, but also flowers, peas, beans and shallots. Orchards of pears and plums were planted. An annual 'Strawberry Wake' was held on the second Sunday of July, where visitors could eat as many as they liked for 6d, until 1922. Garlic was also sold to Lea and Perrins in Worcester. The plot holders also continued with other trades to supplement their incomes, such as nailmaking, making gunlocks and running a grocers' shop. One of the plot holders, John Ward, a butcher from Bolton, ran a pub, now the Dodford Inn.

Because Dodford enjoyed success, it became used in 1880s campaigns by Jesse Collings and others, calling for land reform:

these small cultivators are only acquainted with poor rates from the fact that they have to pay them. What I want to see, and what the working classes, if they are wise, will insist on securing, is that there should be three or four thousand Great Dodfords in England.

The Dodford settlements remained prosperous, and retained their radical character until the 1890s. Ironically, the advocates of land reform successfully established allotments at Catshill, which grew strawberries earlier on lighter soils, pushing prices down. Dodford experienced a brief moment of prosperity during the First World War, as strawberries were sold to Cadbury's for jam, but the tradition died post-war, for a number of reasons. Plots were bought as rural retreats. Strawberries suffered lower quality due to disease and the use of artificial fertilizers. Better wages could be found in the Austin factory at Longbridge, and the cheap labour force of pickers disappeared, as the Bromsgrove nailmaking industry rapidly declined.

== Modern Dodford ==
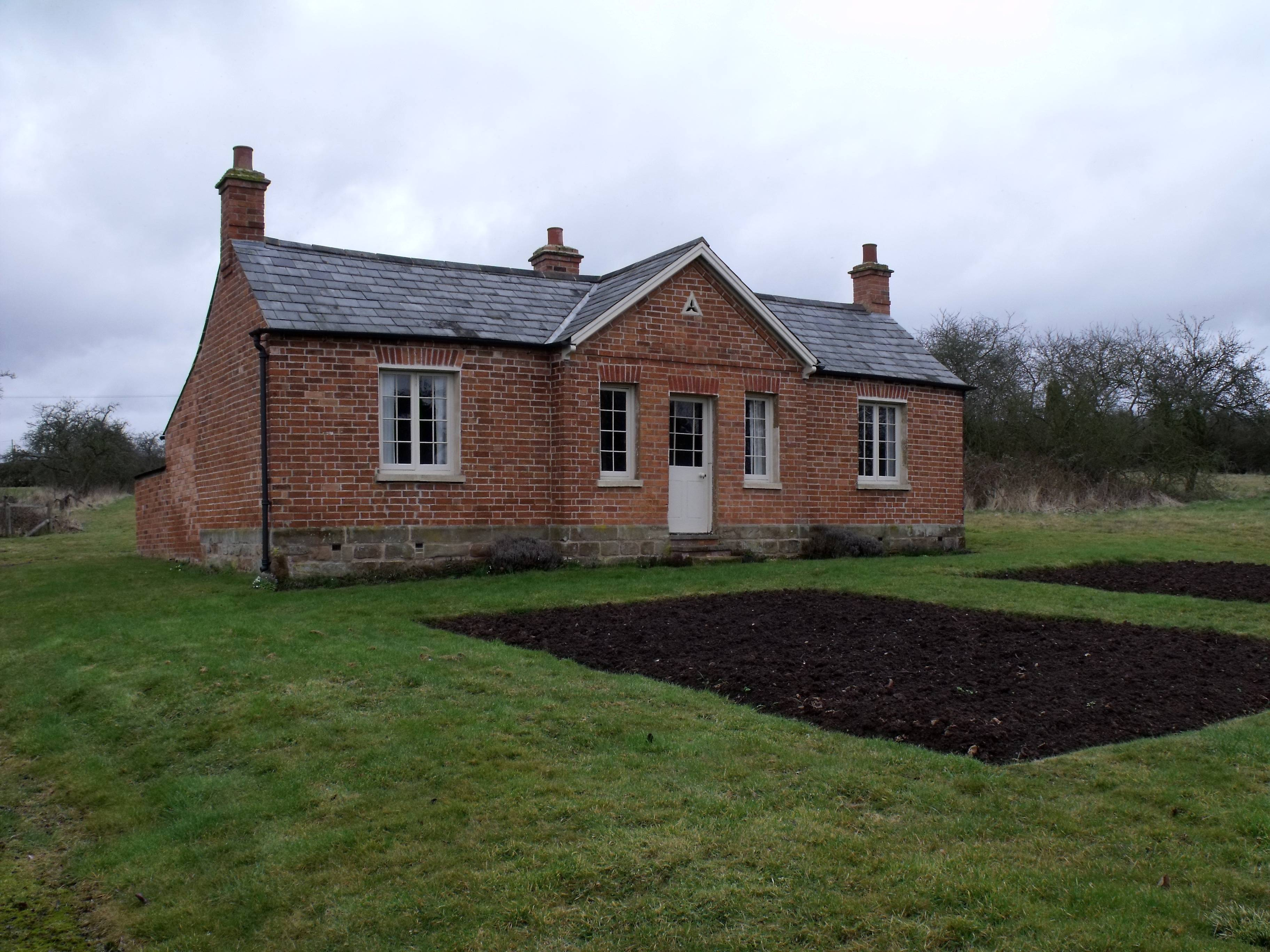
Rosedene, Dodford.

Dodford is now a conservation area, with a number of listed buildings, including a number of Chartist cottages and the Church of the Holy Trinity and St Mary. Rosedene, an example of a Chartist cottage at Dodford, is owned and maintained by the National Trust, and is open to visitors by appointment.

== See also ==
- Timeline of the National Land Company

== Sources ==
- Watts, Victor Ernest, ed. (2004). The Cambridge Dictionary of English Place-Names. Cambridge University Press. ISBN 9781107196896.
