= Bamford (disambiguation) =

Bamford may refer to:

== Places ==
- Bamford, a village in Derbyshire, England, UK
  - Bamford railway station, serves the village of Bamford
    - Bamford and Howden Railway
- Bamford, Greater Manchester, a suburb of Rochdale, England, UK
- Bamford Edge, an overhang of gritstone in Hope Valley, Derbyshire, England, UK

=== Fictional ===
- Bamford, Cotswolds, a place in Ann Granger's Mitchell & Markby mysteries

== Other uses ==
- Bamford (surname)
- Bamford classification for strokes

== See also ==
- J. C. Bamford (disambiguation)
- Bamford and Martin, a UK carmaker, predecessor of Aston Martin
- Nightingale-Bamford School, NYC, NYS, USA; a prep school
- Bamford–Stevens reaction, a chemical reaction
- Bamfordvirae, the Bamford viruses, a taxonomic kingdom, formerly PRD1-adenovirus lineage
- Bamford v Turnley (1860), an English law case concerning nuisance and the use of land
- Balmford
- Balmforth
