= Dodford Priory =

Priory in Worcestershire, England

Coordinates: 52.3535°N 2.1002°W

Dodford Priory was a small Augustinian monastery in the parish of Bromsgrove in Worcestershire in the current village of Dodford.

== History ==
The priory was founded in 1184, probably by King Henry II, which held lands around Bromsgrove. In 1327 it is recorded as owning an advowson of a chantry at St. Nicholas Chapel, Elmley Lovett.

It was not wealthy, with an annual revenue of £4 17s in 1291 according to tax records. By 1464 it was "so near dissolution that for a long time only one canon has remained there" so was ordered by King Edward IV to be merged into the Premonstratensian monastery of Halesowen.

== Dissolution ==
At the 1535 valuation, revenues had increased to £7 from demesne lands and £17 13s 1d from rents and woodlands. Following the Dissolution of the Monasteries it was dissolved in 1536 or 1538. In 1538 the site of the Priory of Dodford was granted with the manor of Dodford to Sir John Dudley who sold it to Andrew Dudley, who sold his "chief mansion house or messuage at Dodford" to John Fownes in 1539. His son or grandson Thomas Fownes (d.1631) (senior) at the time of his death held the reversion of the estate after the death of Jane, widow successively of Henry Dyson and of Thomas's son Thomas Fownes (d.1620) (junior) on whom it had been settled at the time of her marriage with Thomas Fownes. Thomas Fownes (junior) died without progeny in 1620 and in 1633 livery of the manor was made to his brother John Fownes who continued to hold it as late as 1664. Thomas Fownes (f.1675) followed. No further record of the property survives.

== Description of site ==
The site was triangular, measuring 240 by 180 metres, and a moat – or more likely, series of fishponds – is still visible and waterlogged today. Some of the remains are also visible and the listing of the site may include part of the refectory, in particular "a chamfered pointed doorway" on its south west side.

The site was bought by the Chartist Co-operative Land Society in the 1840s to settle working-class families on four, three and two acre plots, where it was hoped they would be able to make a reasonable income. Around 70,000 members paid subscriptions in the hope of gaining a plot, which were allocated by the drawing of ballots.
