= Seamus Moore =

Seamus Moore may refer to:

- Seamus Moore (singer) (born 1947), Irish singer
- Séamus Moore (politician) (died 1940), Irish Fianna Fáil politician from Wicklow
