= JCB =

JCB may refer to:

== People ==
- Jean-Charles Boisset (born 1969), French vinter
- Jimmy Carl Black (1938–2008), American musician
- Joseph Cyril Bamford (1916–2001), British businessman, founder of JCB heavy equipment company
- Jay Clark Buckley (born 1956), American physician and astronaut
- Seamus Moore (singer) (born 1947), Irish singer; known as "The JCB Man"

== Places ==
- JCB Hall, Tokyo Dome City, Tokyo, Japan; a multiuse facility

== Groups, companies, organizations ==
- JCB (heavy equipment manufacturer), a British manufacturer of heavy industrial and agricultural vehicles
  - JCB (callsign JAYSEEBEE; ICAO airline code JCB); see List of airline codes (J)
- JCB (credit card company), originally Japan Credit Bureau, a credit card company based in Tokyo, Japan
- JCB (wine label), a wine label by vinter Jean-Charles Boisset

== Education ==
- Juris Canonici Baccalaureus, Bachelor of Canon law degree
- University of Toronto Joint Centre for Bioethics, a Canadian bioethics program
- JCB Academy, Rocester, Staffordshire, England, UK; a secondary school

== Arts, entertainment, media ==
=== Literature ===
- JCB Prize, a literary award sponsored by the company JCB
- Journal of Cell Biology, a weekly biology journal published by the Rockefeller University Press
- Journal of Crustacean Biology, a quarterly biology journal specialising in carcinology

=== Music ===
- "JCB" (song), a 2005 song by Nizlopi featuring a JCB excavator
- "The JCB Song" (song), a song by Seamus Moore (singer)

== Other uses ==
- JCB Classic, a golf tournament in Sendai, Miyagi, Japan
- Backhoe loader, a piece of heavy equipment, called "JCB" in the UK, Ireland, India

== See also ==
- J. C. Bamford (disambiguation)
