= Yerach Doytsher =

Israeli engineering professor (born 1945)

- ירח דוייצ'ר
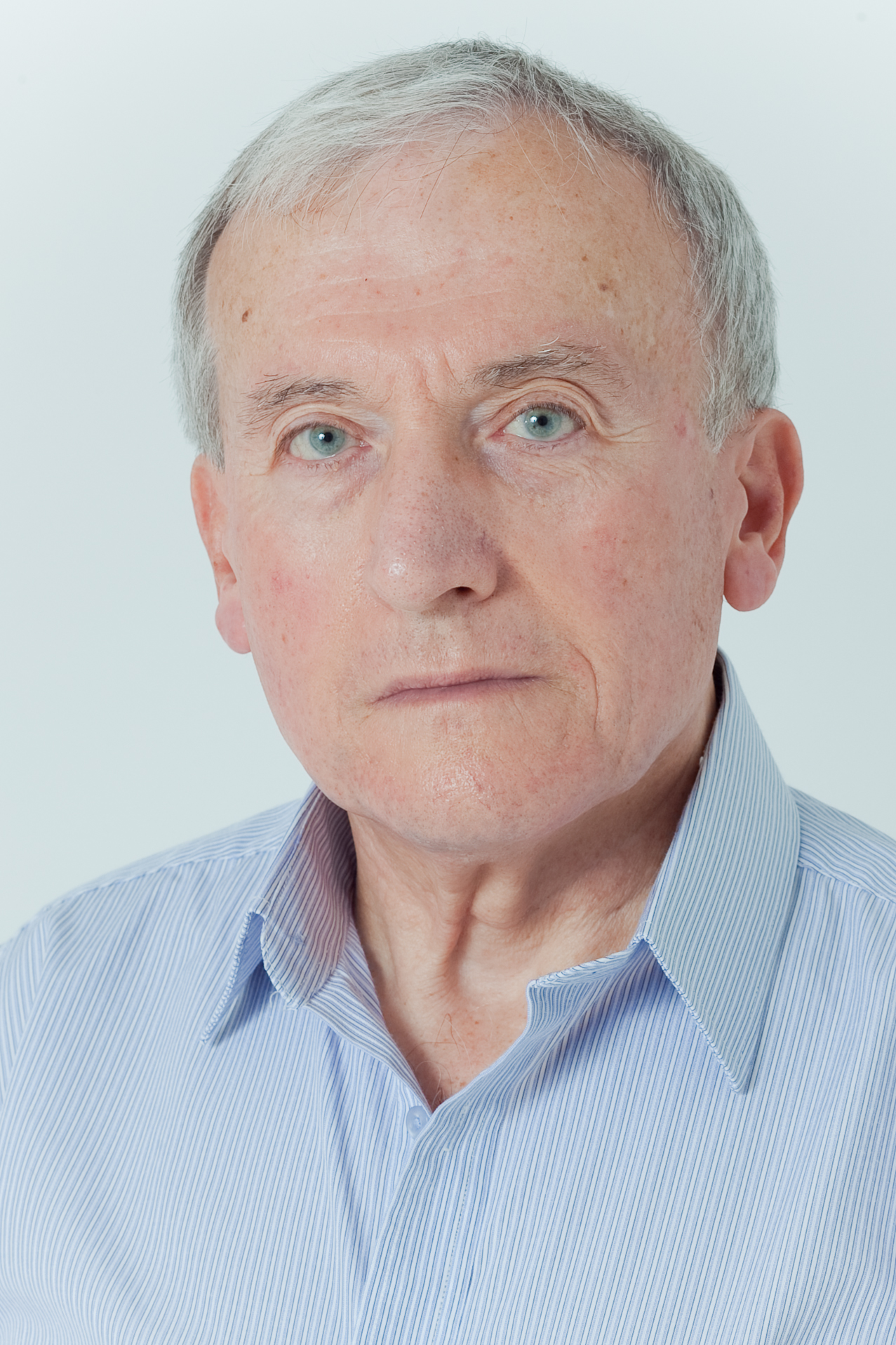
- Born: 1945 (age 80–81); Chelyabinsk, Russia
- Education: Technion – Israel Institute of Technology
- Scientific career
- Fields: Geodetic Engineering
- Workplaces: Technion
- Thesis: Automation Procedures in Mapping (1979)

Yerach Doytsher (Hebrew: ירח דוייצ'ר; born 1945) is a professor emeritus in the Faculty of Civil and Environmental Engineering at the Technion – Israel Institute of Technology, where he was Dean of the Faculty of Architecture and Town Planning and held the Abel Wolman Chair in Civil Engineering.

== Early life and education ==
Yerach Doytsher was born in Chelyabinsk, Russia, and emigrated to Israel with his family in 1950. He studied at Ironi Alef High School in Tel Aviv and served in the Mapping Unit of the Israeli Army as a Geodesist. He received his B.Sc. in civil engineering (summa cum laude) in 1967, and his M.Sc. in geodetic engineering (1973) from the Technion.

His Ph.D. degree was received in 1979 from the Technion. Doytsher authored the thesis "Automation Procedures in Mapping", under the supervision of Professor Benjamin Shmutter.

== Professional activities ==
Doytsher has worked in the Israeli Survey Department and several private mapping and geodetic firms. In 1972 he won the Kaplan Award (as a team member) for development and efficiency in the field of automation in the Israel Survey Department. He was also Professional Manager at Complot International until 1982, Senior Scientific Consultant until 1987 at Mehish Systems and Mapping Consultant and GIS Manager at Malam Systems until 1995.

Since 1996 he has been Consulting several private firms and public organizations, including The Survey of Israel and the Israeli Defense, Housing and Construction and Science Ministries, in his expertise.

Doytsher was Chair of Commission 3 (Spatial Information Management) of the International Federation of Surveyors (FIG) and in 2017 he became a FIG Honorary Member.

He is a member of the editorial advisory board of the academic journal Survey Review.

Doytsher was a member of the Israeli Council for Mapping and serves since 2011 as the President of the Association of Licensed Surveyors in Israel.

== Academic career ==
Simultaneously with his professional career, Doytsher has lectured since the late 1970s at the Technion, starting as an adjunct lecturer and later as an adjunct associate professor. In 1996, he joined the Technion as a faculty member, and was promoted to full professor in 2002. He retired in 2014 as a professor emeritus.

Doytsher held official positions at the Technion, starting as Head of the Geodetic Engineering Division at the Faculty of Civil Engineering (later named Civil and Environmental Engineering) in 1996–2002, Head of the Transportation and Geo-Information Engineering Department (2002–2006) and Dean of the Faculty of Architecture and Town Planning (2006–2010). He was also Head of the Geodesy and Mapping Research Center at the Civil and Environmental Engineering Faculty. In 2005-2014 Doytsher held the Abel Wolman Chair in Civil Engineering.

In 2004 Doytsher won the Talbert Abrams Grand Award, from the American Society for Photogrammetry and Remote Sensing.

Doytsher held visiting academic positions at other universities and research institutes including the University of Calgary, Tel-Aviv University, National Technical University of Athens, New Jersey Institute of Technology, George Mason University, University College London and the University of New South Wales.

Doytsher has mentored over 60 M.Sc. and PhD students and postdocs in the Faculty of Civil and Environmental Engineering.

== Research ==
Doytsher’s research focuses on digital mapping, photogrammetry and spatial information, geographical information systems, digital terrain modeling, 2D and 3D cadastre and land information systems.

== Publications ==
Doytsher has published more than 370 scientific articles. He co-authored one book and is the editor of another.

=== Books ===
- Doytsher Y., Kelly P., Khouri R., McLaren R., Mueller H., Potsiou C., 2010, "Rapid Urbanization and Mega Cities: The Need for Spatial Information Management", Published by the International Federation of Surveyors (No 48), 90 pages, ISBN 978-87-90907-78-5.
- Doytsher Y. 2019 (Editor). Cetl V., Charalabos I., Dalyot S., Doytsher Y., Felus Y., Haklay M., Muller H., Potsiou C., Rispoli E., Siriba D. “New Trends in Spatial Information: The Land Surveyors Role in the Era of Crowdsourcing and VGI (Current State and Practices within the Land Surveying, Mapping and Geo-Science Communities)”, Published by the International Federation of Surveyors (No 73) 120 pages, ISBN 978-87-92853-85-1.

=== Selected articles ===
- Doytsher Y., 2000. "A Rubber Sheeting Algorithm for Non-Rectangular Maps". Computers & GeoSciences, 26(9):1001-1010.
- Benhamu M., Doytsher Y., 2003. “Toward a Multi-Space 3D Cadastre in Israel”. Computers, Environment and Urban Systems, 27:359-374.
- Doytsher y., Galon B., Kanza Y., 2010. "Querying Geo-social Data by Bridging Spatial Networks and Social Networks", 2nd ACM SIGSPATIAL International Workshop on Location Based Social Networks", San Jose, CA, USA.
- Fisher-Gewirtzman D., Shashkov A., Doytsher Y., 2013, "Voxel Based Volumetric Visibility Analysis of Urban Environments", Survey Review, Vol. 45(333): 451-461.
- Doytsher Y., Galon B., Kanza Y., 2017. “Emotion Maps based on Geotagged Posts in the Social Media”. GeoHumanities'17: the 1st ACM SIGSPATIAL Workshop on Geospatial Humanities, pp. 39–46.
- Shriki, U., Gal, O., Doytsher, Y., 2020. “Drone Autonomous Landing on a Moving Maritime Platform Using Machine Learning Classifiers”. International Journal of Data Science and Advanced Analytics, vol. 2(2), pp. 30–35.
- Dror T., Doytsher Y., Dalyot s., 2021. “Investigating the Use of Historical Node Location Data as a Source to Improve OpenStreetMap Position Quality”, Open-Source Geospatial Science for Urban Studies, The Value of Open Geospatial Data, pp. 55–73.
