= Mark Bamford =

Mark Bamford may refer to:

- Mark Bamford (cricketer) (born 1980), English cricketer
- Mark Bamford (film director), American film director

== See also ==
- Bamford (disambiguation)
- Mark (disambiguation)
