= Geodesy (book) =

Textbook on geodesy published in four editions

- Title page for Geodesy Second edition (1962)
- Author: G. Bomford
- Language: English
- Genre: Textbook
- Publisher: Oxford University Press
- Publication date: 1952; 1962; 1971; 1980

Geodesy, also called Bomford's Geodesy, is a textbook on geodesy written by Guy Bomford. Four editions were published, in 1952, 1962, 1971, and 1980 respectively. (Note: See § Primary sources for a citation to every edition.) Bomford retired from his post as a geodesy reader at the University of Oxford 1966, though published two more editions of the book.

== Content ==
Geodesy is formatted as a textbook on the topic of geodesy, with particular emphasis on its applications to triangulation. For content on applied geodesy, it is assumed the reader can use a theodolite and a micrometer. The book also discusses the overlap between geodesy and the study of geophysics.

Due to a limit on space, the first edition intentionally leaves out information on the history of geodesy, only including it when essential to understanding the current practices. In the same edition's acknowledgements, J. de Graaff-Hunter was noted for often discussing the book's content with Bomford. Excluding appendices and following sections, the first edition is 391 pages long.

The book's second edition included information on the tellurometer, which had been introduced after the first edition's publication, and its relevance to triangulation. This edition also covered more details on how the development of electronic computers impacted the field of geodesy. These updates brought the book more up to date in regards to technology and techniques developed since the first edition's publication. The book's third edition was a major rewrite of the second edition, as technology including electromagnetic distance measurement, computers, and artificial satellites had advanced so far since the previous edition.

The fourth and final edition was published in 1980.

== Reception ==
A review of the second edition published in the Bulletin Géodésique stated that the book was worth purchasing for those that found use of the first edition. J. C. Harrison, reviewing for Science, stated that a second edition was "most welcome" to make sure the books stayed current with the changing field. The review's main complaints were that the book focused too heavily on only British perspectives, and that it downplayed the utility of magnetic surveys.

Reviewing the third edition for Geophysical Journal International, A. H. Cook described the editions as "the leading work on geodesy in the English language," and reviewed the edition as "surely maintain[ing] the reputation of its predecessors." The rest of the review remained positive, concluding by describing the book as "impeccable." Peter J. Smith's review in Nature focused on the differences between this edition and the prior ones, and highlighting how the third edition described the use of new technology.

A positive review was published in Geological Magazine by A. H. C., who described the fourth edition as "as comprehensive and up to date as ever." Some negative points were brought up in J. W. Esson's review, published in Geological Journal, which complained the book explained processes but not their importance—the review described the book as "all technique but no passion." However, Esson went on to evaluate the book as "an invaluable reference" and "an unrivalled monolith."
