= Timeline of the National Land Company =

History of the British Chartist pro-working-class property holder

National Land Company
- Founded: provisionally 1846
- Defunct: 1851
- Fate: Wound up by Act of Parliament
- Successor: Court of Chancery
- Headquarters: London,
- Key people: Feargus O'Connor

The National Land Company was founded in the United Kingdom in 1845 by Feargus O'Connor to help working-class people satisfy the landholding requirement to gain a vote in county seats.

== Events of 1845 ==
=== April ===
- Chartist conference approved Feargus O'Connor's plan.

== Events of 1846 ==
=== January ===
- A set of rules for a friendly society were submitted for approval and rejected.

=== March ===
- 14 March Heronsgate - 103 acres (0.42 km^{2}) of land were bought.

=== April ===
- 20 April Heronsgate - The plots were allocated by ballot.

=== July ===
- A second set of rules for a friendly society were submitted for approval and rejected.

=== August ===
- 1 August Lowbands - The plots were allocated by ballot.
- 17 August Heronsgate - An exhibition day was held, starting with a march from the west-end of Oxford Street (now Marble Arch).

=== October ===
- 24 October - The company was provisionally registered as a joint stock company, the Chartist Co-operative Land Company.
- 27 October Lowbands - 170 acres (0.69 km^{2}) of land were bought.

=== December ===
- 17 December - The company was renamed to the National Co-operative Land Company, still on a provisional basis.

== Events of 1847 ==
=== February ===
- Mathon - A deposit was placed on 500 acres (2.0 km^{2}) of land. The purchase was never completed.

=== May ===
- 1 May Heronsgate - The allotees moved in (Location Day).
- 28 May Lowbands - A visiting day was held.

=== June ===
- 5 June Snigs End - 268 acres (1.08 km^{2}) of land were bought.
- 24 June Minster Lovell - 300 acres (1.2 km^{2}) of land were bought.

=== August ===
- 9 August - O’Connor ran for parliament again and won the Nottingham seat.
- 16 August Lowbands - The allotees moved in (Location Day).
- 21 August Minster Lovell - Construction began.

=== October ===
- Snigs End - The purchase was completed.

== Events of 1848 ==
=== January ===
- Great Dodford - 280 acres (1.1 km^{2}) of land were bought.
- 10 January Snigs End - A procession was held through Cheltenham.

=== February ===
- Attempts to gather signatures of shareholders for company registration were abandoned.

=== April ===
- Parliament was petitioned to have the NLC registered as a friendly society.

=== May ===
- 24 May - House of Commons established a Select committee to look into the NLC.

=== June ===
- 9 June - First sitting of the Select Committee.
- 12 June Lowbands - A second visiting day was held.
- 12 June Snigs End - The allotees moved in (Location Day).
- 12 June - scheduled date for the second reading of O'Connor's bill to legalise the NLC.
- 21 June - Second sitting of the Select Committee.
- 30 June - Third sitting of the Select Committee.

=== July ===
- Great Dodford - NLC Conference
- 14 July - Fourth sitting of the Select Committee.
- 28 July - Fifth sitting of the Select Committee.
- 31 July - The Select Committee reported to the House of Commons.

=== August ===
- 1 August - Select Committee final report published.

=== September ===
- Lowbands - First rents demanded, all the tenants declared themselves incapable of paying.

=== November ===
- NLC Conference

== Events of 1849 ==
=== February ===
- 8 February Great Dodford - Three families were reported as applying for parish relief.

=== March ===
- 1 March Minster Lovell - Tenants petitioned Parliament that they had been promised freehold to their plots.

=== May ===
- 12 May Great Dodford - Originally scheduled Location Day.

=== July ===
- 2 July Great Dodford - The allotees moved in (Location Day).
- Parliament voted on and rejected the petition.

=== October ===
- Minster Lovell - Mortgage payment due in Sept was missed. Mortgage holders (on discovering that the mortgage fell due in 1848, not 1854 as thought) sued for repossession. Tenants were given to November 1850 to move out.

== Events of 1850 ==
=== April ===
- 15 April Great Dodford - O'Connor put the estate up for auction. Only three lots sold at the auction, and another three by private contract later.

=== August ===
- Snigs End - O'Connor sent in bailiffs demanding rent or ejection.

=== November ===
- Minster Lovell - Deadline for tenants to move out.

== Events of 1851 ==
=== July ===
- Parliament passed an act to wind-up the company and pass all its affairs to the Court of Chancery.

== Events of 1852 ==
=== November ===
- 4 November - General Election - O'Connor did not stand for re-election having already been committed for insanity.

== Events of 1855 ==
=== August ===
- 30 August - O'Connor died.

== Events of 1857 ==
=== May ===
- 21 May Snigs End - estate mostly sold by auction.
- 27 May Heronsgate was auctioned at the Swan Inn, Rickmansworth.

== Events of 1858 ==
=== June ===
- 2 June Lowbands was auctioned.
