= Green (Martian crater) =

Crater on Mars

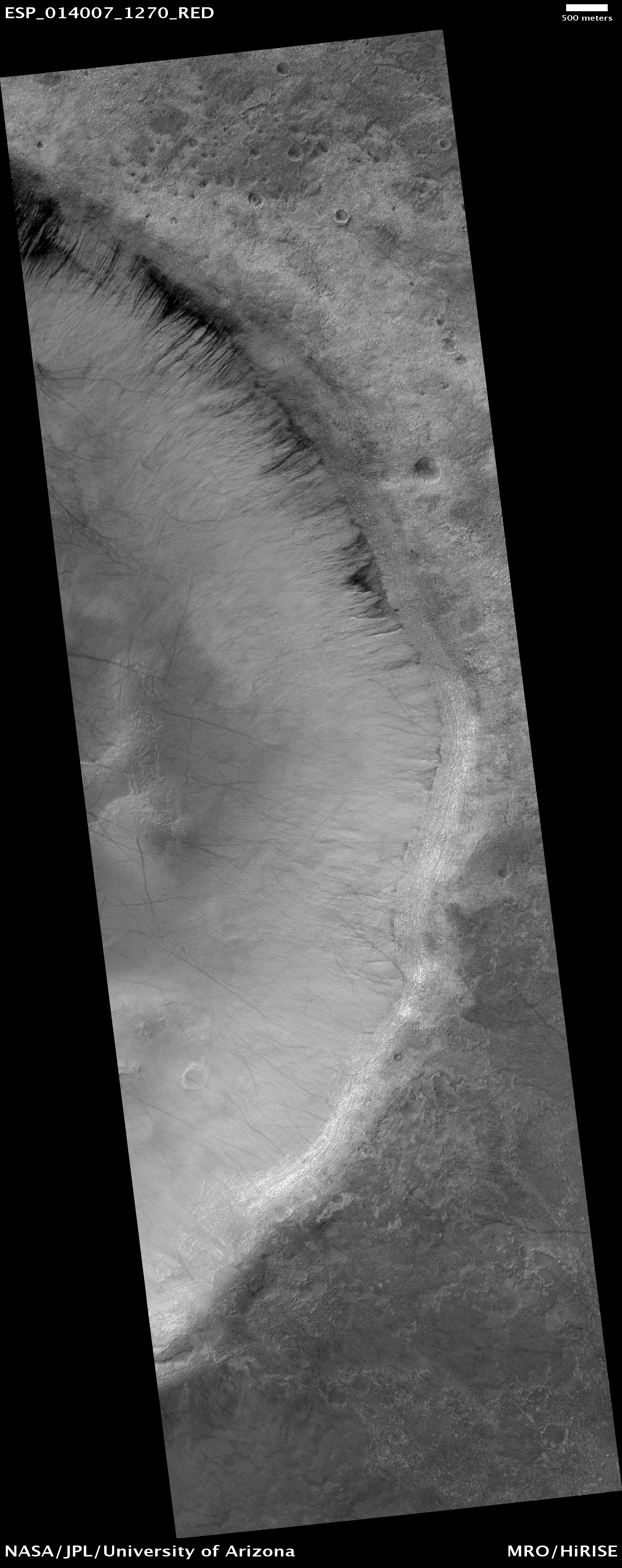
- Gullies in Green crater, as seen by HiRISE.
- Planet: Mars
- Coordinates: 52.7°S 8.4°W
- Quadrangle: Argyre
- Diameter: 184 km
- Eponym: Nathan E. Green

Green is an impact crater in the Argyre quadrangle of Mars. It is named after Nathan E. Green, a British astronomer (1823-1899).

== Description ==
Debris flows have been observed on some of the dunes in this crater. Some researchers believe that they may be caused by liquid water. Liquid water could be stable for short periods of time in the summer in the southern hemisphere of Mars. These gully-like debris flows may be due to small amounts of ice melting.

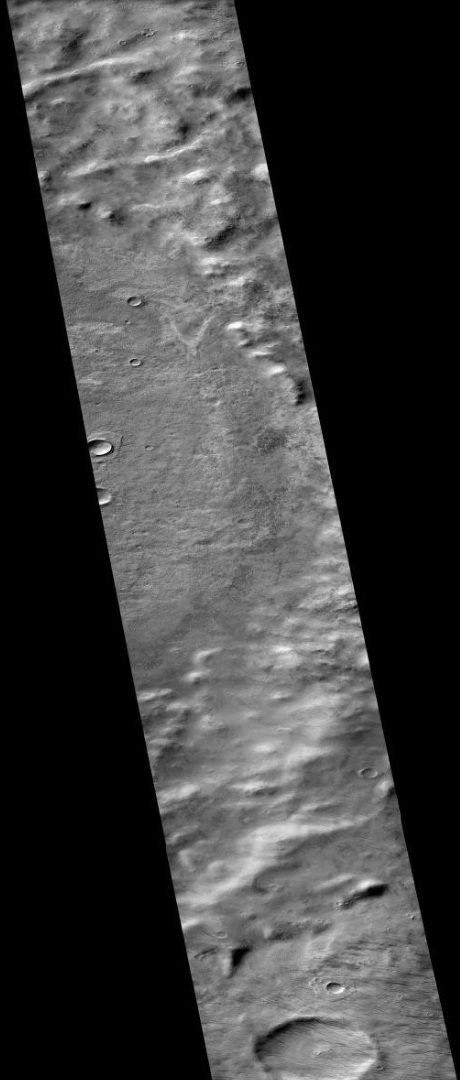
East side of Green crater, as seen by CTX camera (on MRO).

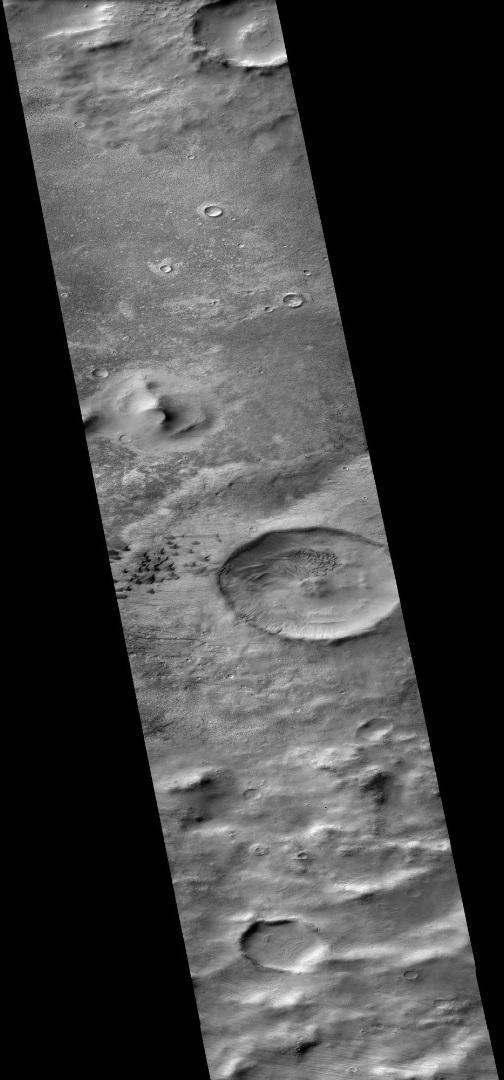
Green crater, as seen by CTX camera. Dark dots are dunes.

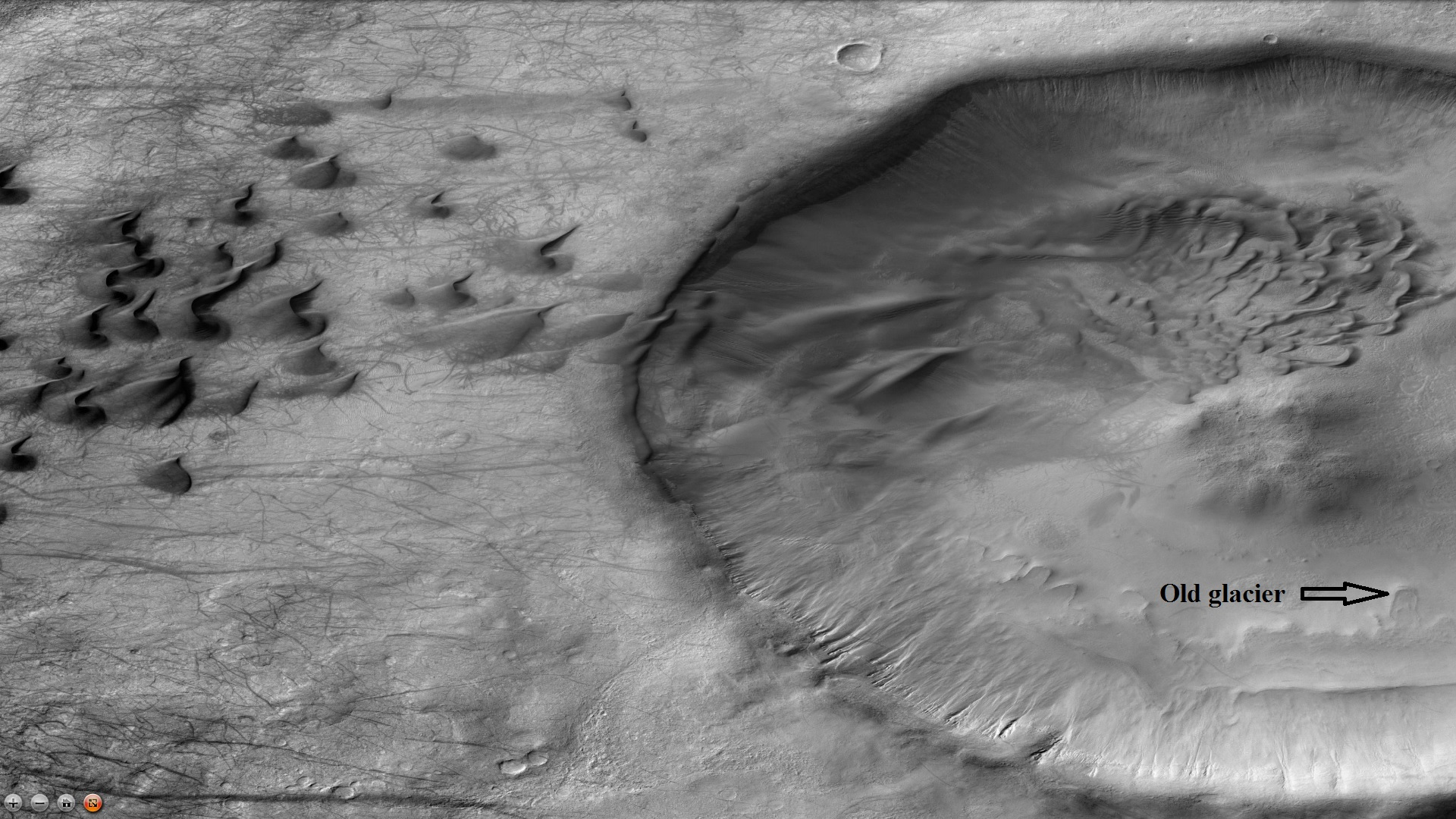
Dunes in Green crater, as seen by CTX camera. This is an enlargement of the previous image. Thin dark lines are dust devil tracks. The crater on the right is within Green crater. Some old glaciers are visible as arc-shaped ridges. An arrow points to one of the glaciers.

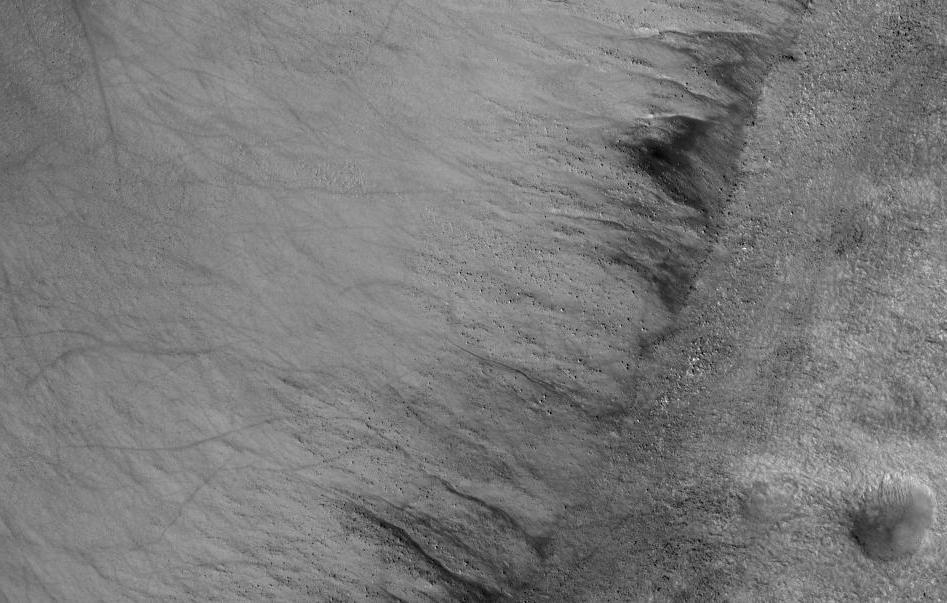
Close-up of gullies in Green crater, as seen by HiRISE.

== Dunes ==
Barchan dunes are present in Green crater and visible in pictures below. When there are perfect conditions for producing sand dunes, steady wind in one direction and just enough sand, a barchan sand dune forms. Barchans have a gentle slope on the wind side and a much steeper slope on the lee side where horns or a notch often forms.

== See also ==
- List of craters on Mars
- Gullies on Mars
