= Thomas Gatacre =

16th-century English politician

Thomas Gatacre (by 1533–1593) was an English politician and cleric.

He was the third son of William Gatacre, and was an MP of the Parliament of England for Gatton in April 1554. His background was a strongly Catholic family at Gatacre Hall, Claverley, Shropshire. His parents sent him to the English college at the University of Leuven. The effect was not as expected, since it strengthened his evangelical Protestantism.

Without family support, Gatacre found the means to studying for eleven years at Oxford, and for four years at Magdalene College, Cambridge. In 1568 he was ordained deacon and priest by Edmund Grindal, Bishop of London, and became domestic chaplain to Robert Dudley, 1st Earl of Leicester. On 21 June 1572 he was collated to the rectory of St Edmund's, Lombard Street. In addition he was admitted to the vicarage of Christ Church, Newgate, on 25 January 1577.

Gatacre died in 1593, his successor at St. Edmund's being instituted on 2 June in that year. He had married Margaret Pigott, of a Hertfordshire family, and left a son Thomas.
