= Benjamin Bomford =

Benjamin Bomford was a prominent Worcestershire farmer in the mid-19th century. He joined the Royal Agricultural Society in 1847 while living at Great Dodford which he later sold to the Chartist National Land Company.

He was an early user of steam technology for farming. He was also a director of the Evesham and Redditch Railway Company, formed in 1863.
