= Nathaniel Everett Green =

English painter

Nathaniel Everett Green FRAS (21 August 1823 – 10 November 1899) was an English painter, art teacher and astronomer. He professionally painted landscapes and portraits, and also gained fame with his drawings of planets.

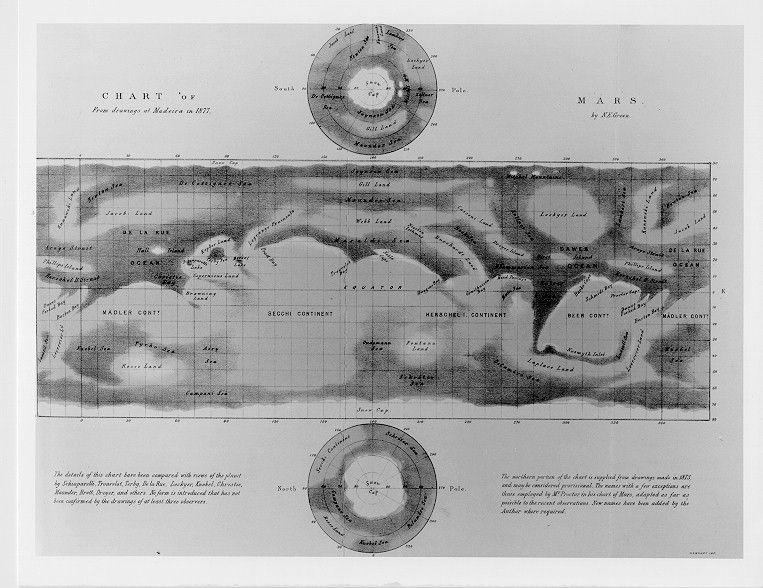
Nathaniel Green's Mars map

Born in Bristol, the son of Benjamin Holder Green (1793–1865), then a haberdasher, and Elizabeth ‘Betsey’ née Everett (1795–1837); his interest in astronomy dated from 1859 when he built a telescope for himself. He produced "soft-pencil" drawings of Mars in 1877, which were widely known. Shortly after drawing them, he was the first to suggest that canals on Mars were an optical illusion.

In 1880 he was called to Balmoral and taught art to some members of the royal family, including Queen Victoria.

He was founding member of the British Astronomical Association (BAA) and its president from 1896 to 1898.

Green married Elizabeth Goold in 1847. Their daughter, Anne Goold Green, married English landscape painter Laurence George Bomford.

A crater on Mars was named in his honor.
