= Guy Bomford =

British soldier and geodesist (1899–1996)

Brigadier Guy Bomford OBE FGS FRAS FRICS
- Born: June 28, 1899; Temple Ewell, Kent, England
- Died: February 10, 1996 Sutton Courtenay, Oxfordshire, England
- Allegiance: United Kingdom
- Branch: Royal Engineers
- Service years: 1917–1940s
- Rank: Brigadier
- Conflicts: World War I, World War II
- Awards: Officer of the Order of the British Empire (OBE); Fellow of the Royal Astronomical Society (FRAS); Fellow of the Geological Society (FGS); Fellow of the Royal Institution of Chartered Surveyors (FRICS)
- Other work: Geodesist, academic at University of Oxford

Brigadier Guy Bomford OBE FGS FRAS FRICS (28 June 1899 – 10 February 1996; also published as G. Bomford or simply G.B. (Note: See, for example the preface to Geodesy, 2nd ed. or G.B. (1967). "Dr. J. de GRAAFF-HUNTER, C.I.E., Sc.D., F.R.S." Survey Review. 19 (144): 50–51. Bibcode:1967SurRv..19...50.. doi:10.1179/sre.1967.19.144.50.)) was a British geodesist who, at various times in his career, worked for both the Survey of India and the Corps of Royal Engineers. He is best known for Geodesy, a textbook he wrote, as well as his work in military surveying and mapping. From 1963 to 1967 he served as the president of the International Association of Geodesy; the association's Guy Bomford Prize is named for him.

Guy Bomford was born on 28 June 1899 in Temple Ewell; his father was Gerald Bomford, a surgeon who encouraged Guy in science, and his mother was Mary Florence Eteson. Bomford later won a scholarship to Marlborough College. He was commissioned to the Royal Engineers in 1917 after leaving the Royal Military Academy, Woolwich. Fighting in World War I, he went to France with the 94 Field Company, but remained at the base for the duration of the war. He was later posted to India, where he experienced fighting on the frontier with Afghanistan, and was the only officer to survive a particular encounter.

In 1921, Bomford joined the Survey of India, with which he remained—with one break—until the outbreak of World War II. During his break from 1922–1924, he studied for an engineering degree at Queens' College, Cambridge; he graduated from Cambridge with first class honors with distinction. Later, during the Second World War, he was again affiliated with the Royal Engineers and was involved in mapping of the Middle East and Burma. He served as Director of Survey, South East Asia Command in 1946, and retired from the army within the next few years. (Note: His year of retirement is given in sources as various dates 1947 through 1949.)

Following his military career, Bomford was appointed as reader in surveying and geodesy at the University of Oxford, where he was a senior member of Brasenose College. He also pursued education at the Queen's College, and received a Master of Arts degree from Oxford in 1948 as well as a Doctor of Science degree in 1953. He retired from his post as reader in 1966, and became an emeritus.

He died on 10 February 1996 in Sutton Courtenay. During his career, he received the following honors:

- Fellow of the Royal Astronomical Society (FRAS, 1936) (Note: His election was proposed in 1935, though he was not confirmed a Fellow until 1936.)
- Officer of the Order of the British Empire (OBE, 1946)
- Fellow of the Geological Society (FGS, 1947)
- Fellow of the Royal Institution of Chartered Surveyors (FRICS, 1950)
