= Rosedene =

Chartist house and museum in Worcestershire, England

Coordinates: 52.3560°N 2.1042°W

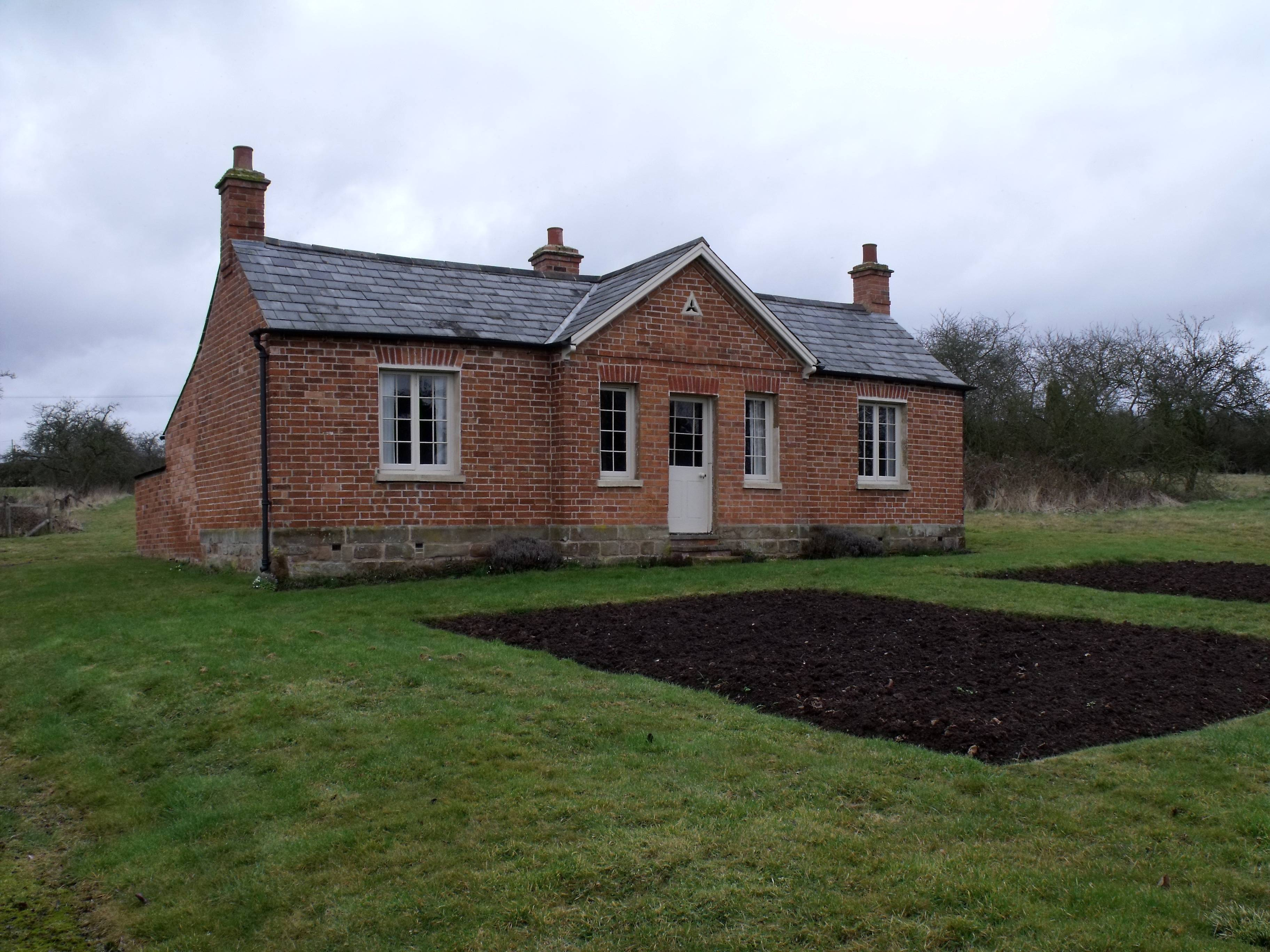
Rosedene Dodford

Rosedene is a cottage built as part of the Great Dodford Chartist settlement. It is the best preserved example of a Chartist cottage built by the National Land Company is a listed building, and is owned by the National Trust.

== History and usage ==
The cottage was built on Plot 29 of the settlement, and was bought by William Hodgkin. He paid £120 as a “bonus” (deposit discounting future ground rents) to secure the property, and another £130 to buy out the property from ground rent when the National Land Company was dissolved. This is the largest amount paid for a plot in a Chartist village.

The original building had two bedrooms, a living room, dairy, store, back hall with well and pump, plus an adjoining piggery, coal house and privy.

Alterations were made to the cottage. A stable was added before 1889, to help carry market garden produce (strawberries, pears and plums) to market in Birmingham. The piggery was converted to a laundry some time between 1915–20, probably as keeping pigs was less necessary as the village’s market garden economy was reasonably profitable. Alterations were made in the 1930s to include an extra bedroom in place of the old store and a new kitchen where the laundry room was, as well as new sitting room where the dairy had once been.

== Restoration ==
The building was bought by the National Trust in 1997. A donation of £1,000 was made by the Bromsgrove Society in 1999.

The cottage was restored to its original state by the Trust and was helped by long-time resident Mrs Florence Crane. The Trust retains a recording of her recollections of living in the property in their archives.

Rosedene now includes an organic garden and retains its plum and pear orchards. Tours can be made on the first Sunday of the month, between 6 March and 4 December by appointment, or otherwise by arrangement.
