= William Cuffay =

English political reformer (1788–1870)

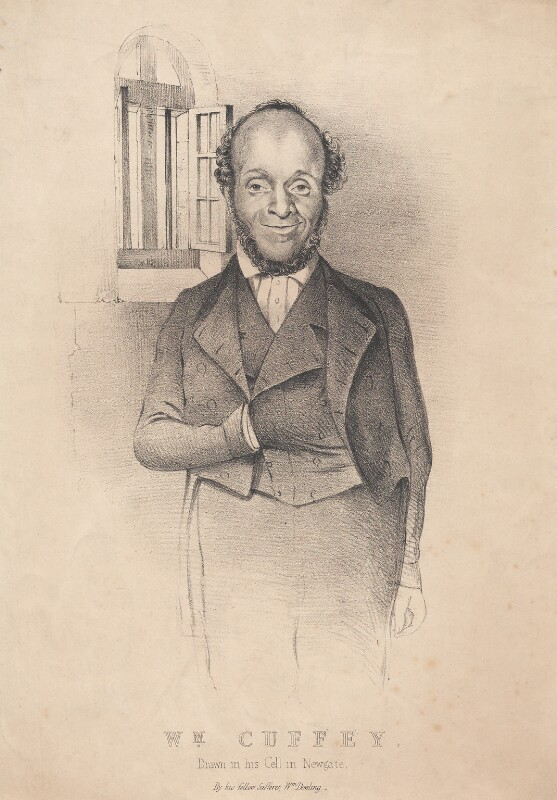
- Born: 1788; Medway Towns, Kent, England
- Died: July 1870 (aged 81–82); Tasmania

William Cuffay (1788 – July 1870) was a Chartist leader in early Victorian London.

== Parents ==
William was mixed-race, the son of an English woman from Gillingham, Kent, Juliana Fox, and a man of African heritage, Chatham Cuffay, who was previously enslaved and originally from Saint Kitts (then a British colony).

Chatham Cuffay and Juliana Fox were married in 1786, and they had five children, one of whom died in infancy. William, the oldest child, was baptised on 6 July 1788, and Juliana on 28 August 1791. Juliana later married a widower named George Chaney, who worked in the dockyard, and between them they had four children.

Chatham Cuffay worked in the Chatham dockyard, and died in 1815. He was buried in Gillingham. His wife Juliana died in 1837, and was buried beside her husband.

== Early life and marriages ==
Born in 1788 in Old Brompton, an area of the Medway Towns that is now in Gillingham, William Cuffay was apprenticed to a tailor, and later worked for Matthews and Acworth, on Chatham High Street. He was of short stature, being 4 ft 11 in (1.50 m) tall. Cuffay moved to London around 1819 and was married three times.

In 1819, Cuffay married Ann Marshall, but she died in 1824. A year later, Cuffay married Ann Broomhead, but she died in childbirth in 1826. Their only daughter, Ann Juliana Cuffay, was baptised at St Mary Magdalene's Church, Gillingham, but she also died shortly afterwards. In 1827, Cuffay married Ann Manvell, a straw hat maker who lived in Lambeth.

In the 1840s, the Cuffays lived at a house on the Strand.

== Trade unionism ==
Cuffay rejected the Owenite trade unions of the London tailors. He went on strike with his fellow tailors in 1834, demanding a ten-hour workday from April to July and an eight-hour day during the rest of the year with pay of 6 shillings and 5 pence a day. The strike collapsed, Cuffay was sacked and subsequently blacklisted from employment.

In 1839, Cuffay helped to form the Metropolitan Tailors' Charter Association. He was elected first to the Chartist Metropolitan Delegate Council in 1841 and onto the National Executive in 1842.

In 1842, as a response to members of the working classes migrating to the colonies, Cuffay urged his members to stay, and instead encourage the aristocracy, who were "vermin", to leave.

He was a significant player in having the Master and Servant Act amended, so employers could no longer have their employees imprisoned if they left their jobs without permission

== Chartism ==
In 1839, Cuffay was involved in the campaign which led to the Chartists presenting a petition to the parliament, which called for universal adult suffrage, no property qualification, annual parliaments, equal representation, payment of members, and vote by ballot. However, despite containing over a million signatures, the House of Commons rejected the petition by 235–46. There was widespread unrest after this motion, and about 500 Chartists were arrested. At the Newport Rising in November, several thousand Chartists attacked the Westgate Hotel and clashed with troops, who opened fire and killed 22 Chartists. Several Chartists leaders were arrested, including John Frost. Cuffay addressed a meeting of the Metropolitan Tailors' Charter Association, in which he spoke out in support of Frost. In response to the protests, the government commuted the sentences against Frost and his colleagues from death to transportation for life to Tasmania.

In 1842, Cuffay was one of the Chartist leaders who presented another petition to parliament, containing the original six points, but also calling for Irish independence. This petition had over three million signatures, but it suffered the same fate, being rejected by 287–49. A series of strikes broke out as a result of the rejection of this petition. About 1500 Chartists were arrested, and approximately 600 were put on trial. Cuffay signed a letter to the Northern Star newspaper, seeking to raise funds for the prisoners on behalf of the Metropolitan Chartists.

In 1843, at a Chartist meeting in High Holborn, Cuffay addressed the crowd, and thanked the working classes, on behalf of his relatives who were now freed slaves, for their support in helping to abolish slavery in the colonies. He said that he now dedicate himself to assist the working classes of Britain to gain their freedom.

Feargus O'Connor, the MP for Nottingham, set up the National Land Company, with the support of the Chartist movement. Cuffay was one of the auditors of the Land Company.

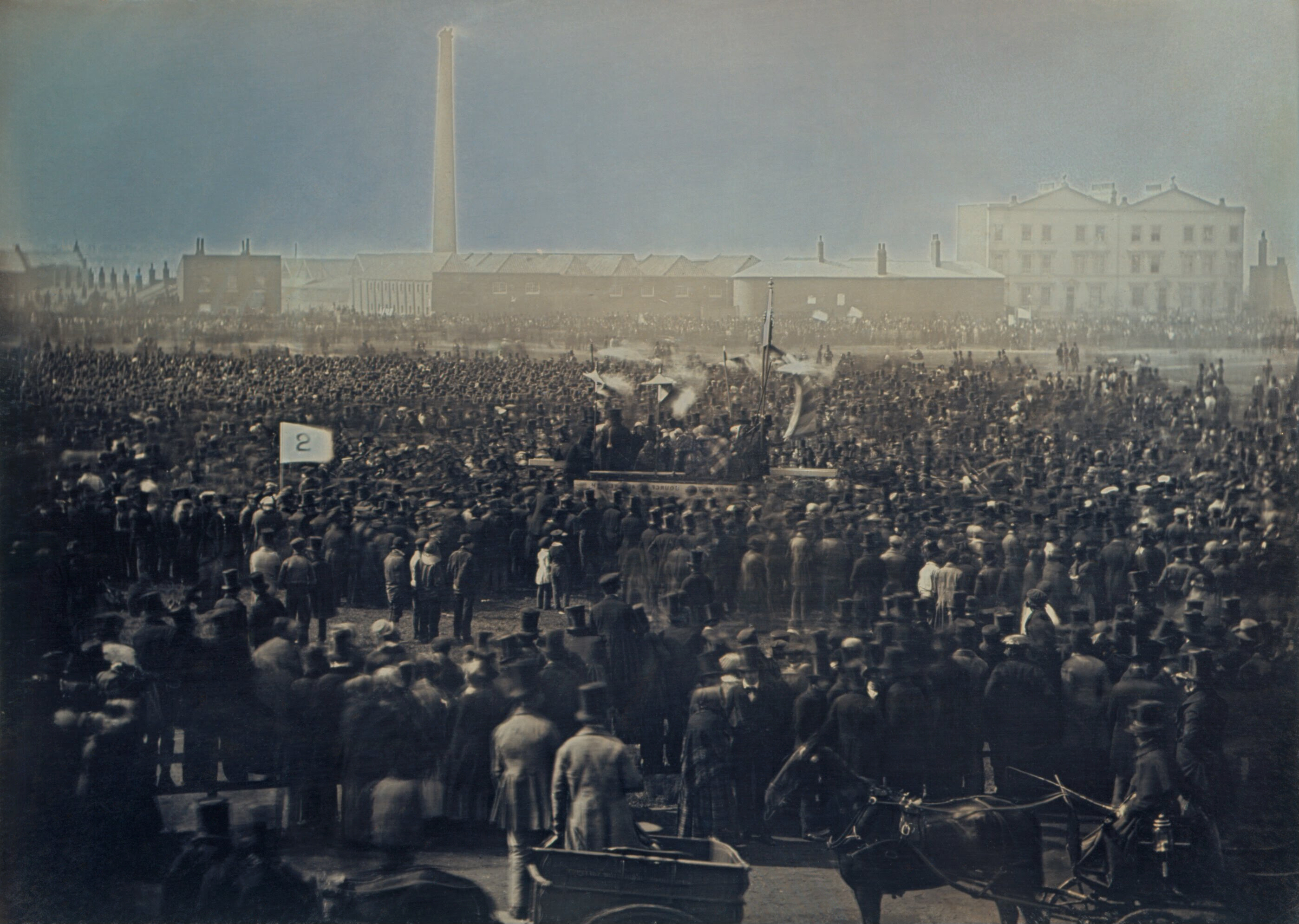
Photograph of the 1848 Chartist meeting on Kennington Common, taken by William Edward Kilburn

Cuffay was one of the organisers of the large Chartist rally on Kennington Common on 10 April 1848, but was dismayed by the timidity of other leaders, such as O'Connor, who had rejected the idea that the rally should be a show of force. Cuffay's radical faction soon became involved in plans for a display of "physical force".

Several hostile newspapers, including the Times, the Illustrated London News, and the Standard used racist language in their attempts to denigrate the activism of Cuffay.

It is also reported that Cuffay was a good singer, and sang at a number of Chartist events. He was often listed as a performer of the Laughing Song by William Blake for Chartist fund-raising events.

== Arrest and transportation ==
In the summer of 1848, Chartists began assembling in London at the Ulterior Committee of Chartists and Irish Confederates. At a meeting on August 13, Cuffay was appointed secretary, but later that day, betrayed by a government spy, Cuffay was arrested and accused of "conspiring to levy war" against Queen Victoria.

Cuffay was defended by eminent barrister John Walter Huddleston, who was hired by Feargus O'Connor. However, he was convicted of preparing acts of arson, intended as a signal for the planned armed uprising.

Cuffay was sentenced to 21 years penal transportation.

Cuffay spent the rest of his life in Tasmania. Before his arrival, his name was well-known to many Australians, because a number of reports on his trial in British newspapers were reprinted in the Australian press. When he landed on 29 November 1849, his arrival was reported in several newspapers, including The Courier in Hobart.

Though he was pardoned three years after his conviction, Cuffay elected to stay in Tasmania, working as a tailor and involving himself in local politics. In 1851, Cuffay was involved in a "public meeting of the free trade unions", to further the aims of the Anti-Transportation League, and to stop the use of convict labour in public works. Cuffay campaigned against the Master and Servant Act in England, and continued that activism in Australia.

In the early 1850s, Mary Cuffee applied for financing to enable her to travel to Tasmania, and join her husband, which she did in 1853.

Cuffay's transportation to Australia did not end his political activity. He continued to organise and agitate for democratic rights in Tasmania.

== Death ==
Cuffay died in poverty at the Hobart Invalid Depot on 29 July 1870 at the age of 82.

Although Cuffay died a pauper, seven Australian newspapers in three states – Tasmania, New South Wales and Victoria – published obituaries. One observed that his grave had been "marked", should a memorial to him be built at some future time. The memorial never transpired, and Cuffay was forgotten in Australia and Britain. Interest has since been rekindled, with plans in motion to construct the abandoned memorial or a statue on the site.

== Media and events ==
Cuffay was the subject of a 2010 BBC Radio 4 programme entitled Britain's Black Revolutionary written and presented by the former trades union leader Bill Morris.

Cuffay was also the subject of a 2011 ABC Hindsight radio documentary entitled Isle of Denial: William Cuffay in Van Diemen's Land, which was shortlisted in the NSW Premier's Award in 2012.

He also appeared in the third series of the UK television show Victoria.

During the summer of 2013, a small exhibition was mounted in the UK Houses of Parliament, marking the 175th anniversary of the publication of the People's Charter. It included, poignantly, the copy of Byron's collected poetry that London Chartists had given to Cuffay when he was transported, "as a token of their sincere regard and affection for his genuine patriotism and moral worth".

On 15 July 2021, a Nubian Jak Community Trust blue plaque was unveiled at Chatham Historic Dockyard in memory of both William Cuffay and his father Chatham Cuffay.

== See also ==
- List of convicts transported to Australia
