= Harry Bamford (disambiguation) =

Harry Bamford (1920–1958) was an English footballer for Bristol Rovers.

Harry Bamford may also refer to:

- Harry Bamford (footballer, born 1914) (1914–1949), English footballer for Brentford FC and Brighton & Hove Albion
- Harry Bamford (footballer, born 1886) (1886–1915), English footballer for Southampton FC
