= Thomas Gataker =

English clergyman and theologian

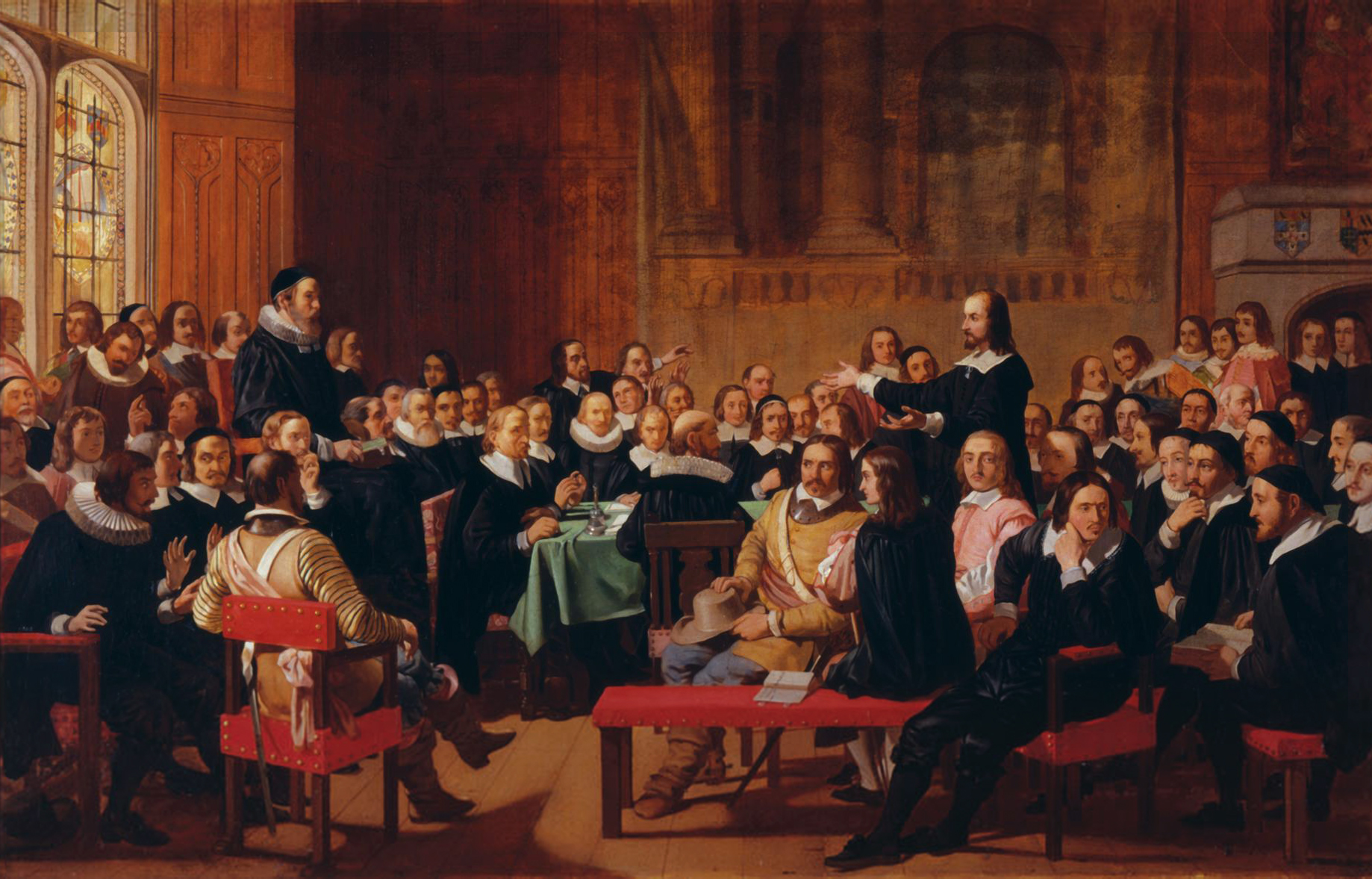
Tomas Gataker depicted on Assertion of Liberty of Conscience by the Independents of the Westminster Assembly of Divines by John Rogers Herbert (1847)

Thomas Gataker (* London, 4 September 1574 – † Cambridge, 27 June 1654) was an English clergyman and theologian.

== Life ==
He was born in London, the son of Thomas Gatacre. He was educated at St John's College, Cambridge. From 1601 to 1611 he held the appointment of preacher to the society of Lincoln's Inn, which he resigned on accepting the rectory of Rotherhithe. In 1642 he was chosen a member of the Westminster Assembly, and annotated for them the books of Isaiah, Jeremiah and Lamentations.

He disapproved of the introduction of the Covenant and declared himself in favour of episcopacy. He was one of the forty-seven London clergymen who disapproved of the trial of Charles I.

He engaged in a public controversy with the astrologer William Lilly, who had mentioned Gataker in an almanac, which has some further biographical details.

== Works ==
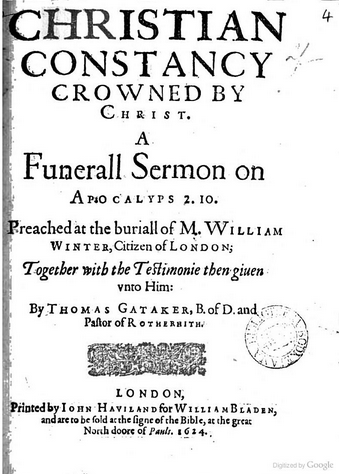
Christian constancy crowned by Christ, a funerall sermon, preached, 1624, Thomas Gataker

His principal works, besides some volumes of sermons, are:

- Of the Nature and Use of Lots (1619), a curious treatise which led to his being accused of favouring games of chance, but which Boswell called "a learned book of the age". Gataker understood the random nature of lots and argued that they could not be used to discern the intention of God. The second edition in 1627 contained a refutation of James Balmford's criticism. It was edited and republished in 2008 as The Nature and Uses of Lotteries, Conall Boyle (ed.) Imprint Academic.
- Dissertatio de stylo Novi Testamenti (1648)
- Cinnus, sive Adversaria miscellanea, in quibus Sacrae Scripturae primo, deinde aliorum scriptorum, locis aliquam multis lux redditur (1651), to which was afterwards subjoined Adversaria Posthuma
- an edition of Meditations by Marcus Aurelius (1652)

His collected works were published in Utrecht in 1698.
