= Frank Ellis Bamford =

U.S. Army brigadier general

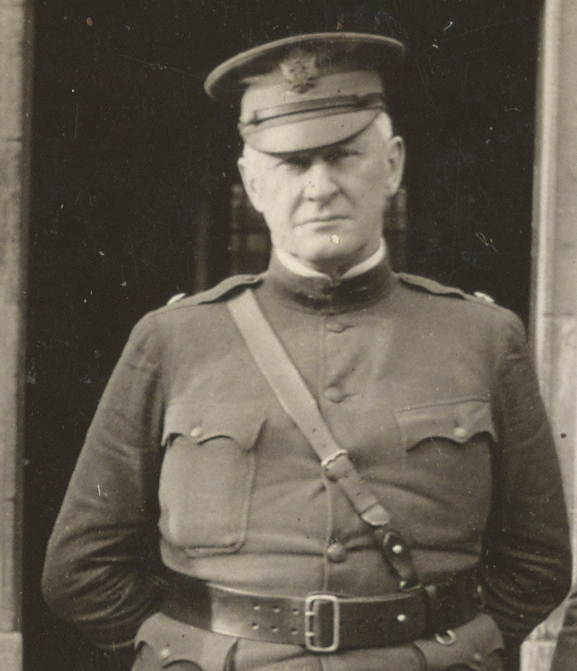
- Born: November 15, 1865; Milwaukee, Wisconsin, U.S.
- Died: May 27, 1932 (aged 66); Summit Point, West Virginia, U.S.
- Burial place: Arlington National Cemetery
- Education: University of Wisconsin–Milwaukee
- Military career
- Allegiance: United States
- Branch: United States Army
- Service years: 1891–1921
- Rank: Brigadier General
- Service number: 0-435
- Unit: U.S. Army Infantry Branch
- Commands: Company G, 28th Infantry; 16th Infantry Regiment; 1st Division; 26th Division
- Conflicts: Philippine–American War; World War I
- Awards: Army Distinguished Service Medal

Frank Ellis Bamford (November 15, 1865 – June 27, 1932) was an American Brigadier general active during World War I.

== Early life ==
Bamford was born in Milwaukee, Wisconsin. In 1887, he graduated from the University of Wisconsin–Milwaukee with a bachelor's degree in mechanical engineering.

== Military career ==
On July 14, 1891, Bamford enlisted in the Second Infantry and quickly progressed from corporal sergeant to sergeant major of the regiment. On October 7, 1893 he was commissioned a second lieutenant in the Fifth Infantry.

In April 1898, he was promoted to first lieutenant and transferred to the 15th Infantry. On February 2, 1901, Bamford became a captain and went to the 28th Infantry. While in command of Company G, 28th Infantry, he served in the Philippines during the Philippine–American War.

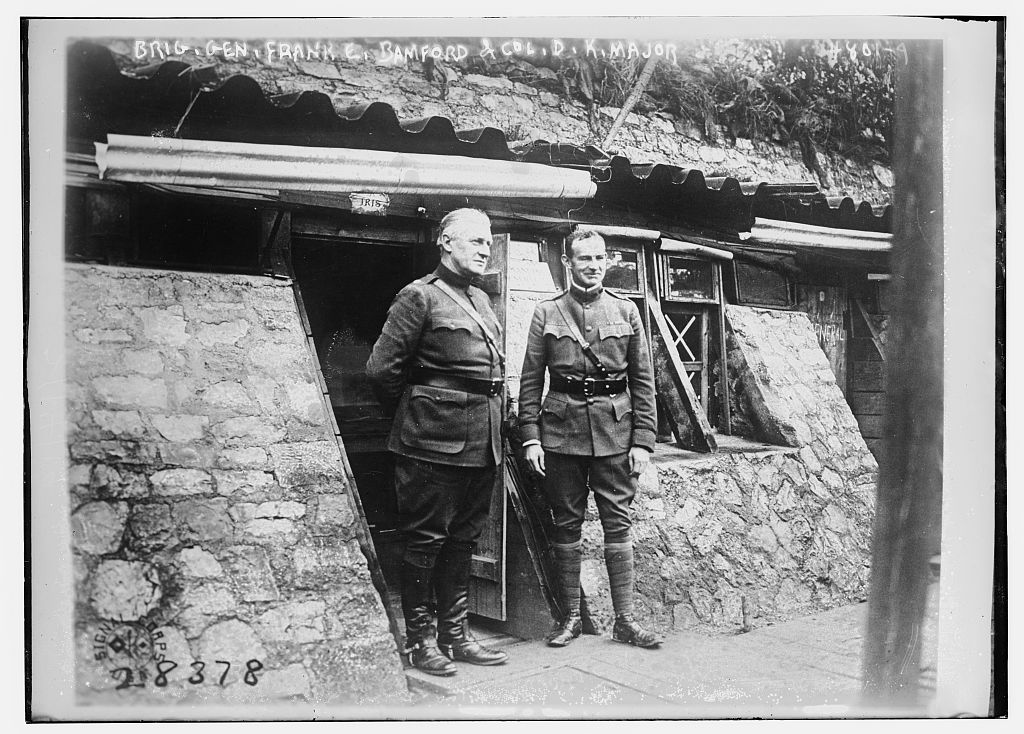
Bamford and Duncan Kennedy Major Jr. (1876-1947) in 1918

During World War I, he commanded a battalion and then took command of the 16th Infantry Regiment. He then commanded 2nd Infantry Brigade, 1st Division. Bamford was promoted to brigadier general of the National Army on August 8, 1918. He next commanded 1st Division. He organized and conducted the II Corps School and also commanded the army school in Langres, France. He later succeeded Clarence Ransom Edwards as commander of the 26th Division.

Bamford retired on August 5, 1921.

== Awards ==
For his service, Bamford was awarded the Army Distinguished Service Medal, the citation for which reads:

The President of the United States of America, authorized by Act of Congress, July 9, 1918, takes pleasure in presenting the Army Distinguished Service Medal to Brigadier General Frank E. Bamford, United States Army, for exceptionally meritorious and distinguished services to the Government of the United States, in a duty of great responsibility during World War I. As its Commanding Officer General Bamford organized and successfully conducted the Second Corps School. Successively in command of a battalion, regiment, brigade and division, he participated in the operations of American troops from Cantigny to those of the Meuse-Argonne. He later commanded the Army School at Langres, at all times bringing to bear upon his duties his sound judgment, high military attainment, and untiring zeal.

== Death and legacy ==
Bamford died at the age of sixty-six on June 27, 1932. He was buried at Arlington National Cemetery.

== Bibliography ==
- Davis, Henry Blaine Jr. Generals in Khaki. Raleigh, NC: Pentland Press, 1998. ISBN 1571970886 OCLC 231779136

Military offices
Preceded by Clarence R. Edwards	Commanding General 26th Division; 1918	Succeeded by Harry C. Hale
