= Heronsgate =

Village in Hertfordshire, England

Coordinates: 51.640261°N 0.520048°W

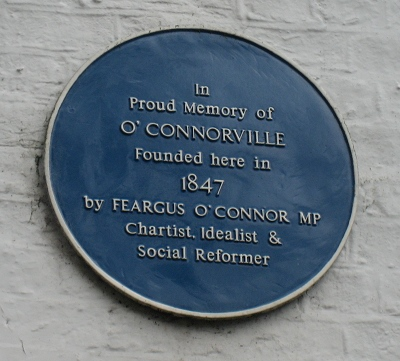
Feargus O'Connor commemorated at Heronsgate

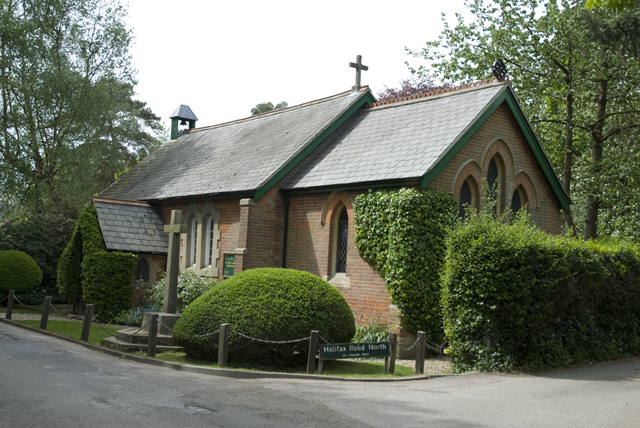
St John's Church (Church of England)

Heronsgate (or formerly Herringsgate) is a settlement on the outskirts of Chorleywood, Hertfordshire founded by Feargus O'Connor and the Chartist Cooperative Land Company (later the National Land Company) as O'Connorsville or O'Connorville in 1846.

== O'Connorville ==
The Chartist Cooperative Land Society was launched by the National Charter Association in 1845 with the aim of resettling industrial workers from the cities on smallholdings, making them independent of factory employers and potentially qualifying them for the vote.

Chartists were invited to subscribe regular amounts towards an eventual £2.50 (£2/10s) share in the venture. Soon the money began to flood in, pennies and shillings at a time, and was deposited in an account held by Feargus O'Connor in the London Joint Stock Bank.

The land was bought on 14 March 1846, the plots allocated by ballot on 20 April 1846 (Easter Monday) and settled on 1 May 1847.

The 35 plots of land covering 103 acres (0.42 km^{2}), consisted of 17 plots of 2 acres, 5 plots of 3 acres and 13 plots of 4 acres. A beer house established on the edge of the estate is now known as the Land of Liberty, Peace, and Plenty public house.

The National Land Company was wound up by Act of Parliament in 1851. The estate was administered by the Court of Chancery until the freeholds were sold off by auction on 27 May 1857.

== Location ==
Heronsgate lies by junction 17 of the M25, to the south of Chorleywood.

== Notable residents ==
- From 1936 to 1955, a villa in Heronsgate was the global headquarters of the International Esperanto-League (since 1947 called World Esperanto Association).
- Composer Maurice Jacobson lived at White Lodge, Long Lane in the 1960s
- Socialist writer Johnny Speight, creator of the TV series Till Death Us Do Part and the character Alf Garnett, lived in a house called 'Fouracres'
- Kim Philby and his family rented a gatehouse in 1951 at the time of his resignation from MI6.
