= J. C. Bamford (disambiguation) =

J. C. Bamford may refer to:

- Joseph Cyril Bamford CBE (1916–2001), UK businessman, founder of JCB Excavators LTD
- Joseph Cyril Edward Bamford (born 1977), a UK businessman and investor, grandson of Joseph Cyril Bamford (1916–2001)
- J. C. Bamford Excavators Limited (founded 1945), a heavy equipment maker founded in the UK by Joseph Cyril Bamford (1916–2001)

== See also ==
- Bamford (disambiguation)
- JCB (disambiguation)
- JC (disambiguation)
- JB (disambiguation)
