= Balmford =

Balmford is a surname. Notable people with the surname include:

- Andrew Balmford, British ecologist
- James Balmford (1556–after 1623), English clergyman
- Mary Balmford (1907–1969), British sculptor
- Rosemary Balmford (1933–2017), Australian judge, barrister, solicitor and legal academic
- Samuel Balmford (died 1657), English Puritan minister

== See also ==
- Bamford
- Balmforth
