= Laurence George Bomford =

English painter and clergyman

Reverend Laurence George Bomford (6 August 1847 – 2 July 1926) was an English painter and clergyman.

== Life ==
Laurence George Bomford was born on 6 August 1847 to Irish parents Samuel Bomford (17 Sept 1813 – 14 Apr 1898) and Francis Jane Winter (5 Aug 1819 - 17 May 1910).

Bomford was born at Tyne Hall, Bembridge, Isle of Wight, and educated at Cheltenham College.

He married Anne Goold Green (8 January 1849 – 6 Mar 1908), daughter of the respected British landscape artist and astronomer Nathaniel Everett Green, in Marylebone, London in 1874. They had no children.

In 1918 he retired to St. Albans, where he died on 2 July 1926, aged 78 and is buried at St. Mark's Church in Colney Heath alongside his father in law.

Laurence is the brother of Sir Gerald Bomford.

== Career ==
Bomford worked as a landscape painter before, at 36 years of age, deciding to follow his brother, Rodon Charles Bomford (10 June 1845 - 25 December 1915), and become a clergyman. He entered Cambridge University in October 1883 to study at Emmanuel College, Cambridge. In 1886, he gained his Bachelor of Arts with a first class Tripos in Theology and followed this with a Master of Arts degree in 1890. He was ordained in 1886 and became a priest in the Diocese of Ely in 1887. He was curate of Saint Andrew-the-less in Cambridge from 1886 to 1890, then between 1890 and 1896 was curate of Trowbridge in Wiltshire. His last curacy was at Barnet in Hertfordshire from 1895 to 1898.

When his father died Laurence was appointed Vicar of St. Mark's church in Colney Heath, near St. Albans in Hertfordshire, where he remained for twenty years between 1898 and 1918 until his retirement from the church.

== Artist ==
Laurence Bomford was an accomplished artist, actively painting between 1873 and 1920. His works are mainly in watercolour and often plein-air sketches with only a small number of oil paintings being known. He was clearly professionally taught, and was a pupil of Nathaniel Everett Green, who would become his father-in-law. Green's influence can be seen, particularly in Bomford's early work. His landscape paintings are characterised by delicate brushwork in a semi-impressionist fashion with excellent perspective and composition, and good contrasts between light and shade. Several still life studies of flowers are known and the odd seascape is also recorded, again primarily in watercolour. He travelled widely to paint, with works depicting locations throughout England and Wales, with a particular love for South Devon, and North Wales which are represented in many of his works. There exists a smaller number of pieces from Scotland, and from an overseas excursion to Switzerland and northern Italy in 1906.

Bomford was a respected artist during his lifetime. His pictures were widely appreciated, being offered for auction, for example, in Melbourne, Australia in 1876. He was exhibited at the Christchurch Exhibition, New Zealand, alongside other English and Italian artists in 1882. In recent times his works have occasionally come onto the open market, being offered by major auction houses in Europe, America and South Africa.

A large number of Bomford's works were sold as part of an estate sale by the Bonhams auction house, Oxford, in March 2012. Many of the 150 or so pieces, from across his painting career were priced up in pencil for sale, possibly following the artist's death, though had remained together for some 90 years and appear to comprise the bulk of the output produced by artist during his lifetime.
