= Gerald Bomford =

British surgeon

- Born: 19 July 1851; Tyne Hall, Bembridge, Isle of Wight, Hampshire, England
- Died: 12 April 1915 (aged 63); London, England
- Occupation: surgeon

Sir Gerald Bomford KCIE FRCSE (19 July 1851 – 12 April 1915) was a British surgeon who succeeded Benjamin Franklin as the Director General of the Indian Medical Service and held the post between 1905 and 1910, until being succeeded by Charles Pardey Lukis. His children included Sir Hugh Bomford and Guy Bomford.

He was created a Companion of the Order of the Indian Empire (CIE) in the 1903 Durbar Honours, and was later promoted to a Knight Commander of the order (KCIE).

Sir Gerald Bomford is a younger brother of landscape artist Laurence George Bomford.
