= Bomford Peak =

Mountain in South Georgia

Bomford Peak (54°8′S 37°38′W) is, at 1,140 metres (3,740 ft) the highest peak located centrally on the peninsula between Wilson Harbour and Cheapman Bay on the south side of South Georgia. It was surveyed by the South Georgia Survey (SGS) in the period 1951–57 and named for Captain Anthony G. Bomford, Royal Engineers, senior surveyor of the SGS, 1955–56.
