= Balmforth =

Balmforth is a surname of English origin, being a variant of the surname Bamford. Notable people with the surname include:

- Anthony Balmforth (1926–2009), British archdeacon
- Darren Balmforth (born 1972), Australian former lightweight rower
- Denive Balmforth (born 2003), English professional rugby league footballer

== See also ==
- Bamford (surname)
- Balmford
