= James Balmford =

English clergyman

James Balmford (1556 – after 1623) was an English clergyman.

== Works ==
Balmford published in 1594 a Short and Plaine Dialogue concerning the unlawfulness of playing at cards, London. This short tract against card games is dedicated to the mayor, aldermen, and burgesses of Newcastle-on-Tyne. It is stated in Hazlitt's Handbook that the Dialogue appeared also in broadside form. In 1623 there was a religious controversy on casting lots, which Thomas Gataker defended in some cases. Balmford reprinted his Dialogue, and added some animadversions on Gataker's treatise on the topic, Of the Nature and Use of Lots. Gataker in the same year replied, stating his opponent's objections in full, and answering them point by point.

In 1607 Balmford published Carpenter's Chippes, or Simple Tokens of unfeigned good will to the Christian friends of J. B., the poor Carpenter's sonne. The book, which is dedicated to the Countess of Cumberland, contains three discourses:— (1) The Authoritie of the Lord's Day; (2) State of the Church of Rome; (3) Execution of Priests. Balmford is also the author of A Shorte Catechisme summarily comprizing the principal points of the Christian faith, London, 1607, and of A Short Dialogue concerning the Plagues Infection, 1603, dedicated by Balmford to his parishioners at St Olave's, Southwark.
