= Survey Review =

- Discipline: Earth and atmospheric sciences, Engineering
- Language: English

Publication details
- Former name(s): Empire Survey Review
- Publisher: Taylor & Francis

Standard abbreviations
- ISO 4: Surv. Rev.

Indexing
- ISSN: 0039-6265 (print); 1752-2706 (web)

Links
- Journal homepage

Survey Review is an academic journal published by Taylor & Francis about surveying and geodesy. It started in 1931 as Empire Survey Review and acquired the current name in 1963. Its editor-in-chief is Peter Collier; its 2018 impact factor is 1.442.
