= Harry Bamford (footballer, born 1886) =

English footballer (1886–1915)

Personal information
- Full name: Harold Walley Bamford
- Date of birth: 2 November 1886
- Place of birth: Sculcoates, Yorkshire, England
- Date of death: 26 November 1915 (aged 29)
- Place of death: near Etaples, France
- Height: 5 ft 10 in (1.78 m)
- Position: Left-half

Youth career
- Bitterne Guild

Senior career*
Years	Team	Apps	(Gls)
1908–1911	Southampton	7	(0)
1912–1914	Glossop	14	(0)
- * Club domestic league appearances and goals

Harold Walley Bamford (2 November 1886 – 26 November 1915) was an English professional footballer who played as a half-back for Southampton in the Southern League from 1908 to 1911, and later for Glossop in the Football League.

== Football career ==
Bamford was born in Sculcoates in Yorkshire, but moved to Southampton when young. Employed as a pay clerk in Southampton Docks, he played his youth football for Bitterne Guild before joining Southampton in the 1908 close season.

Most of his time with the "Saints" was spent in the reserves whom he helped win the Hampshire Senior Cup in 1910. His first-team debut came on 9 January 1909, when he took the place of Bert Trueman at left-half for the Southern League match at Luton Town, which was lost 1–0. Bamford retained his place for two further matches, before John Robertson replaced him, although Bamford returned for two matches at the end of February. Bamford made two further appearances, in April 1910 and in April 1911.

== Later career ==
In August 1912, Bamford reverted to amateur status, and joined Glossop of the Football League Second Division on amateur terms.

== War service ==
Bamford enlisted in the King's Shropshire Light Infantry during the First World War. The regiment's 1st Battalion was based at Tipperary in August 1914, as part of the 16th Brigade of the 6th Division which landed at Saint-Nazaire in September 1914 for service on the Western Front. He was wounded fighting in the Ypres Salient in November 1915, and died of septicaemia in No. 1 Red Cross Hospital, near Etaples.

Bamford held the rank of Second Lieutenant and was awarded the 1914–15 Star, Victory and British War Medals.

The Commonwealth War Graves Commission records show he was the son of Annie Bamford, of 5, Cliff Road, Itchen, Southampton, and the late Abraham Bamford. He is buried at Étaples Military Cemetery, near Le Touquet.
