= Seamus Moore (singer) =

- Also known as: The JCB Man; Moore The Hurr
- Born: 18 June 1947 (age 79); Callan, County Kilkenny, Ireland
- Genres: Country and Irish
- Occupations: Singer, publican
- Instruments: Vocals, drums
- Years active: 1980s–present
- Label: Hazel Records
- Website: seamusmoore.com

Seamus Moore (born 18 June 1947) is an Irish performer. Moore entered a talent contest and won with his own composition "The JCB Song". After two years, he was presented with a gold disc by his record company I&B Records to mark over 50,000 sales. He has been known as The JCB Man ever since. When touring, he is also known as 'Moore the Hurr on Tour'. Moore ran his own public house in Burnt Oak, Middlesex called Conways 3 from 2010 to 2016.

== Discography ==
Moore has released several albums including:

- On The Brew
- Me Galluses and me Gansy
- The Tinker's Potcheen
- The Winning Dream
- The Pie Bald Ass
- Fluthered on the Moon
- Cricklewood NW2
- Mad To Go Again
- A Tough Yoke
- Having A Bit Tonite
- Seamus Just Wants To Be Famous
- The Traveller's Daughter

He also released a 4-track EP entitled The Big Bamboo which consists of "The Big Bamboo", "The Fly", "Bang Bang Rosie", and "The Pothole Song".

Other hits include "The Transit Van", "Flash The Lights", "Pakistani Pat", "The Cobblefighter", "The Lightning Express", "The Crossroads Of Life", and "My Little Honda 50".
