= National Land Company =

British Chartist pro-working-class property holder

- Founded: provisionally 1846
- Defunct: 1851
- Fate: Wound up by National Land Company Dissolving Act 1851 (14 & 15 Vict. c. cxxxix)
- Successor: Court of Chancery
- Headquarters: London
- Key people: Feargus O'Connor

The National Land Company was founded as the Chartist Co-operative Land Company in 1845 by the chartist Feargus O'Connor to help working-class people satisfy the landholding requirement to gain a vote in county seats in Great Britain. It was wound up by the National Land Company Dissolving Act 1851 (14 & 15 Vict. c. cxxxix).

== Chartism ==
The Reform Act 1832 extended the franchise. In county constituencies in addition to forty shilling freeholders franchise rights were extended to owners of land in copyhold worth £10 and holders of long-term leases (more than sixty years) on land worth £10 and holders of medium-term leases (between twenty and sixty years) on land worth £50 and to tenants-at-will paying an annual rent of £50.

The chartists had, as one of their objectives, the enfranchisement of the working man. O'Connor focussed his energies on enabling working-class people to satisfy the landholding requirement to gain a vote in county seats. In his single minded pursuit of this objective he diverged from the mainstream of Chartism.

O’Connor declared that Great Britain could support her own population if her lands were properly cultivated. As has been pointed out, he had no use for co-operative tillage; his plan was for peasant proprietorship. In his book 'A Practical Work on the Management of Small Farms' he set forth his plan of resettling surplus factory workers on little holdings of from one to 4 acres (16,000 m^{2}). He held that the only possible way to raise wages was to remove surplus labour out of the manufacturers' reach, and thus compel him to offer higher wages. He had no doubts of the yields obtainable under such spade-husbandry.

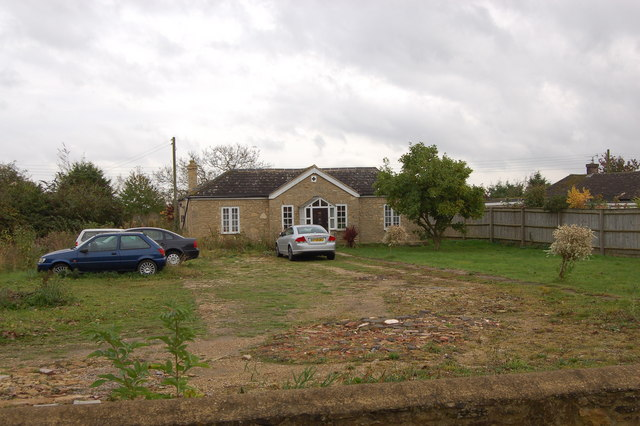
Former Chartist cottage and plot in Charterville Allotments, Oxfordshire

== Establishing the company ==
O'Connor proposed an enterprise in which working men could purchase land on the open market. The land was to be reconditioned, broken up into small plots, equipped with appropriate farm buildings and a cottage, and the new proprietor was to be given a small sum of money with which to buy stock. The plan was approved at the Chartist conference in April 1845.

The form of the company was problematic. A set of rules were drawn up for a friendly society and submitted for approval in January 1846. They were rejected. Another set of rules were submitted and again rejected in July 1846. The company was provisionally registered as a joint stock company, the Chartist Co-operative Land Company, on 24 October 1846. The provisional registration allowed the company to enrol shareholders and to collect deposits on the shares. It did not allow any trading activity, nor the purchase, contracting for purchase, or holding of land. In order to complete the registration it was necessary to collect the signatures of one quarter of the shareholders.

The company was renamed to the National Co-operative Land Company on 17 December 1846, and its stated objectives were expanded. The registration was still on a provisional basis.

Among the joint auditors of the Land Company were tailors and Chartists William Cuffay and James Knight.

== Flaws ==
As well as the obvious defects in O’Connor's land plan that he either did not see or consider important, there were flaws in the execution:

- Consideration was not given to the difficulty that would be encountered by town people, many who had never lived in the country, in becoming farmers.
- If his plan worked, the more land he bought the higher the price of future purchases would become. His plan was built upon the assumptions that land could be bought in unlimited quantities and at reasonable rates.
- He assumed that all subscribers would be successful farmers who would repay promptly.
- Few persons would have agreed with his optimistic calculations that prosperous farming could be carried on such small scale and with the primitive methods that he advocated.
- His plan to push the Charter in the background in favour of his land plan caused a storm in the Chartist movement.
- O'Connor was left in control of the company without check or supervision. He was uninterested in record keeping and detail.
- The inherent conflict in deciding the sizes of the plots. The larger the plot, the more likely it was that the settlers would make a success of it but larger plots also served to delay the acquisition of plots for the remaining shareholders. The smaller the plot, the more shareholders could be settled but smaller plots also meant that it was harder for the settlers to make a living.

This meant that the settlers, who for the most part had no rural experience, were settled on plots which would be demanding even for those who had rural experience.
The size of the estates meant that the settlers generally formed a large percentage of the communities to which they were attached. It was feared that the influx of a large number of poor people could overwhelm the parish's resources as had happened at Cholesbury, Buckinghamshire in the early 1830s.

Flaws such as these were heavily emphasised by early historians. However, since the 1990s several studies of the Chartist Land Company have advanced more-positive interpretations that help to clarify why the scheme was so popular. It has even been suggested that the National Land Company was a benchmark – sometimes positive, sometimes less so – for subsequent UK land reformers.

== Settling the estates ==
Money came in at a remarkable rate, considering the poverty of most of the subscribers. The subscribers who got the land were chosen by ballot. They were to pay back with interest and ultimately all subscribers would be settled. The Labourer magazine was started by O’Connor and Jones to promote the project. Soon hundreds of households were settled, and an outcry of opposition went up from hostile Chartists, the press, the Poor Law authorities who feared the weight of their failures, and other quarters.

Among the working men the prestige of Chartism was growing again. The land plan offered more immediate promise of help than the Charter with its long-range promises. O’Connor's carelessness and inaccuracy with financial matters, as well as the free hand he had in purchasing land as he saw fit, were inherent weaknesses in the administration of the scheme. The plan would have soon collapsed had he not been an able promoter.

In the same year O’Connor ran for parliament again and won over Hobhouse for the Nottingham seat. When he had taken his seat he proposed in The Labourer that the government take over the National Land Company to resettle the English peasantry on a large scale. His opposition within the Chartist movement accused him of being "no longer a 'five-point' Chartist but a 'five acre' Chartist". O’Connor replied to his critics in an appearance before a mass meeting of his partisans in Manchester. His followers demonstrated at this meeting how devoted they were to him.

== Continuing efforts to establish the company ==
The efforts to establish the company as a friendly society or as a joint stock company had foundered. The effort to collect the signatures of the shareholders was abandoned in 1848. (Later investigation showed that the required number of signatures had been reached, but the company failed to appreciate the difference between the number of shares and the number of shareholders.)

In the meantime, in April 1848, a new petition to have the NLC registered as a friendly society was produced with about 6 million signatures, but an investigating committee in Parliament found that it contained not quite 2 million bonafide signatures. This came as a shock to O'Connor since his lieutenants had not let him know that all was not in order. However, lieutenants such as Cuffay dismissed O'Connor's concerns about the veracity of some signatures, asserting that it mattered little what the exact number of signatures were, but that a sufficient number of signatures had been found to "demand attention from any government."

O'Connor introduced a bill to legalise the NLC, with a second reading set for 12 June 1848. This prompted some investigation, led by Sir Benjamin Hall, which quickly turned up the fact that O'Connor was registered as the owner of all the estates, and of the associated bank. This prompted the House of Commons to set up a select committee to look into the NLC on 24 May 1848.

== Select committee ==
The select committee issued minutes of its hearings, and then a final report on 1 August, delivered in the House on 31 July. Its principal findings were:

- Lottery

The select committee found that the company's plans would not ensure that all the shareholders would get a plot of land. It was therefore a lottery, which barred it from registration as a company. They found it to be a lottery by two analyses.
- The financial lottery

O'Connor's financial projection at the outset was as follows:

Sell 2,000 shares at £2 10s, raising £5,000.
Buy 120 acres (0.49 km^{2}) at £18 15s per acre (£2,250) and then build, fit out, and stock (£2,750), total £5,000.
60 two acre plots would each generate £5pa, totalling £300pa.
The freehold could be sold for 20 years rental, £6,000, which would finance the next, larger, cycle.

The select committee's figures, based on the reality went as follows:

There were 70,000 shareholders, each needing a plot & house costing £300. A total of £21 million would be required to satisfy them all.
There were 70,000 shareholders, fully paid up at an average of £3 18s, yielding £273,000.
Mortgaging the first tranche would raise £182,000 for the second tranche, based on the two-thirds mortgages, the best then available. By the eighteenth tranche the mortgage would be insufficient to build another. At this point £819,114 would have housed 2,730 shareholders, leaving 67,270 shareholders unhoused.

- The time lottery

Even if it were possible to mortgage the properties for 100%, so that there would be no limit to the number of times this cycle could repeat, time would be a limiting factor. Assuming a buy-build-settle-remortgage cycle could be completed in a year, it would take 75 years before all the shareholders could be settled.

- O'Connor's Bill

Since the company was a lottery it was not consistent with the principles of a friendly society. O'Connor's bill was therefore useless.

- Expectations

The National Land Company was an illegal scheme that would not fulfill the expectations held out to the shareholders.

- Records

The books had been imperfectly kept; in fact, O’Connor had lost £3,400 by the company. Ironically, had the records been better kept those collecting shareholder signatures would have realised they had met the threshold to finalise the company's registration. The bill which precipitated the standing committee (and the company's demise) would not have been necessary.

- Recommendation

It was recognised that the parties had got into their predicament in good faith. It was therefore proposed that they should be given the opportunity to wind up the company's affairs themselves.

== Aftermath ==
The illegality of the company, and the need to wind it up, exposed the conflicting interests of the four groups involved.

- Settled shareholders, did not want to pay the rent which was due, and wanted clear title to their plots.
- Unsettled shareholders, wanted the settled shareholders to pay their rents so that the pot of cash to be divided out among all shareholders would be maximised.
- Directors, wanted to avoid any liability for outstanding debts of the company.
- O'Connor, wanted to recover his expenses before any payout to shareholders.

National Land Company Dissolving Act 1851
- Act of Parliament
- Parliament of the United Kingdom
- Long title: An Act to dissolve "The National Land Company," and to dispose of the Lands and Property belonging to the Company, and to wind up the Undertaking.
- Citation: 14 & 15 Vict. c. cxxxix

Dates
- Royal assent: 7 August 1851

After a number of court cases an act to wind-up the company, the National Land Company Dissolving Act 1851 (14 & 15 Vict. c. cxxxix), was passed by Parliament in July 1851 and all its affairs were passed to the Court of Chancery. The settled shareholders mostly disappear from the records of the estates in the years following, and the estates themselves were auctioned off. Many of the properties are extant, some listed or in conservation areas.

== The settlements ==
=== Heronsgate ===
51°38′24.94″N 0°31′12.17″W

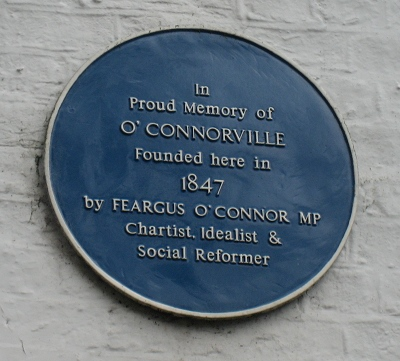
Feargus O'Connor commemorated at Heronsgate

Also called O'Connorville.

103 acres (0.42 km^{2}) of land at Heronsgate, Hertfordshire were bought in March 1846 for £2344. The plots were allocated by ballot of the 1487 eligible shareholders on 20 April 1846 (Easter Monday) in Manchester; 17 2-acre (8,100 m^{2}) plots; 5 3-acre (12,000 m^{2}) plots; and 14 4-acre (16,000 m^{2}) plots. An exhibition day was held on 17 August 1846 which started with a march from the west-end of Oxford Street (now Marble Arch). The allotees moved in on 1 May 1847 (Location Day). After the company was wound up, the estate was auctioned on 27 May 1857. By 1858 only three of the original allotees remained, two of whom had rural backgrounds. The influx of more affluent residents provided a market for the produce of the poorer residents.

=== Lowbands ===
51.981285°N 2.328973°W

170 acres (0.69 km^{2}) of land at Lowbands in Redmarley D'Abitot, Worcestershire (now in Gloucestershire) was bought in October 1846 for £8100.

Compared to Heronsgate: water was more readily available, lime was half the price, sand was free for the taking, labour was cheaper at 10s/week, and bricks were 17s per 1,000 cheaper. The ballot was held on 1 August 1846. The estate comprised 15 2-acre (8,100 m^{2}) plots; 8 3-acre (12,000 m^{2}) plots; 23 4-acre (16,000 m^{2}) plots; a 10-acre (40,000 m^{2}) water meadow; and a common, "Forty Green". A visiting day was held on 28 May 1847, and Location Day was 16 August 1847. A second visiting day was held on 12 June 1848 (Location Day for Snigs End). After the company was wound up, the estate was auctioned on 2 June 1858.

=== Snig's End ===
51.959156°N 2.303739°W

268 acres (1.08 km^{2}) of land at Snig's End in Staunton, near Gloucester, and partly in Corse, Gloucestershire was bought on 5 June 1847 for £11,000. The purchase was completed in October 1847. The ballots were held through the autumn of 1847 for the plots, 35 2-acre (8,100 m^{2}) plots; 12 3-acre (12,000 m^{2}) plots; 35 4-acre (16,000 m^{2}) plots. A procession through Cheltenham was held on 10 January 1848. Location day was on 12 June 1848, while the select committee was still inquiring into the NLC.

=== Minster Lovell ===
51.791948°N 1.54727°W

Also called Charterville.

300 acres (1.2 km^{2}) of land at Minster Lovell in Oxfordshire was bought on 24 June 1847 for £10,878. The estate straddled the Cheltenham to Oxford and Witney to Brize Norton roads, removing the need to provide roads on the estate. Construction began on 21 August 1847 and neared completion by the end of the year. Unlike the other estates which had a formal Location Day, Minster Lovell was occupied piecemeal through the summer of 1848.

=== Great Dodford ===
52.354766°N 2.099547°W

280 acres (1.1 km^{2}) of land at Great Dodford, Worcestershire was bought in the winter of 1847/8 for £10,350, with a £5,000 mortgage. The select committee report had been issued before the plots were allocated, effectively forbidding the continued use of lotteries to allocate the plots. A quarter of the estate was assigned to winners from previous ballots, and the rest was assigned by auction, which they called a "bonus" system. The average winning bonus was £75. The bonus system robbed the poor, who had been the NLC's greatest backers, of any hope of getting a plot and precipitated the decline of the NLC.

Location day was set for 12 May 1849, then pushed back to 2 July 1849. Some families arrived much earlier. Three families were reported as applying for parish relief as early as 8 February.

The failure of the tenants to pay any rent forced O'Connor to put the estate up for auction on 15 April 1850. Only three lots sold at the auction, and another three by private contract later.

One of the cottages, Rosedene, is owned and maintained by the National Trust, and is open to visitors by appointment.

=== Mathon ===
52.10988°N 2.38983°W

The land at Mathon, Worcestershire (now Herefordshire), was planned, a deposit placed, but never carried through.
