= Philippine Department =

US Philippine Department
- Philippine Command Shoulder Sleeve Insignia
- Active: 13 January 1911–9 April 1942
- Countries: United States of America; Commonwealth of the Philippines
- Allegiance: United States Army
- Branch: Army, Philippine Scouts
- Type: Infantry, Cavalry, Artillery, Quartermaster, Air Corps
- Role: Corps
- Size: 30,000
- Part of: Department of War
- Island Garrison: Fort Santiago, Manila, Luzon
- Colors: White, Blue
- March: World War II
- Equipment: M1903 Springfield Rifles, M1 Garand Rifles, M1923 Thompson Submachineguns, M1917 Browning Machineguns, M2 Browning Heavy Machineguns, M1917 75mm Howitzers, M1A1 75mm Pack Howitzers, M1918 155mm Howitzers
- Engagements: Philippines campaign (1941–1942); Battle of Bataan; Battle of Corregidor; Japanese Invasion of Visayas; Japanese Invasion of Mindanao
- Decorations: US Presidential Unit Citation; Philippine Presidential Unit Citation

Commanders
- Notable commanders: General Douglas MacArthur, Major General George Grunert, Lucius Roy Holbrook

The Philippine Department (Filipino: Kagawaran ng Pilipinas/Hukbong Kagawaran ng Pilipinas) was a regular United States Army organization whose mission was to defend the Philippine Islands and train the Philippine Army. On 9 April 1942, during World War II, the organization surrendered to the Japanese. The department and its sub-units were predominantly under the command of American officers, including an American general, while the majority of the troops were enlisted Filipinos, known as the Philippine Scouts (PS). The primary force of this department was the Philippine Division. Of the 22,532 troops, 10,473 were members of the Philippine Division itself.

This unit was formally organized in 1913 and, on 26 July 1941, was attached to US Army Forces – Far East (USAFFE). Following the creation of USAFFE, the Philippine Department became, in effect, a corps area service and logistical command. Tactical command was permanently transferred to USAFFE's control.

== The Philippine Department in 1914 ==
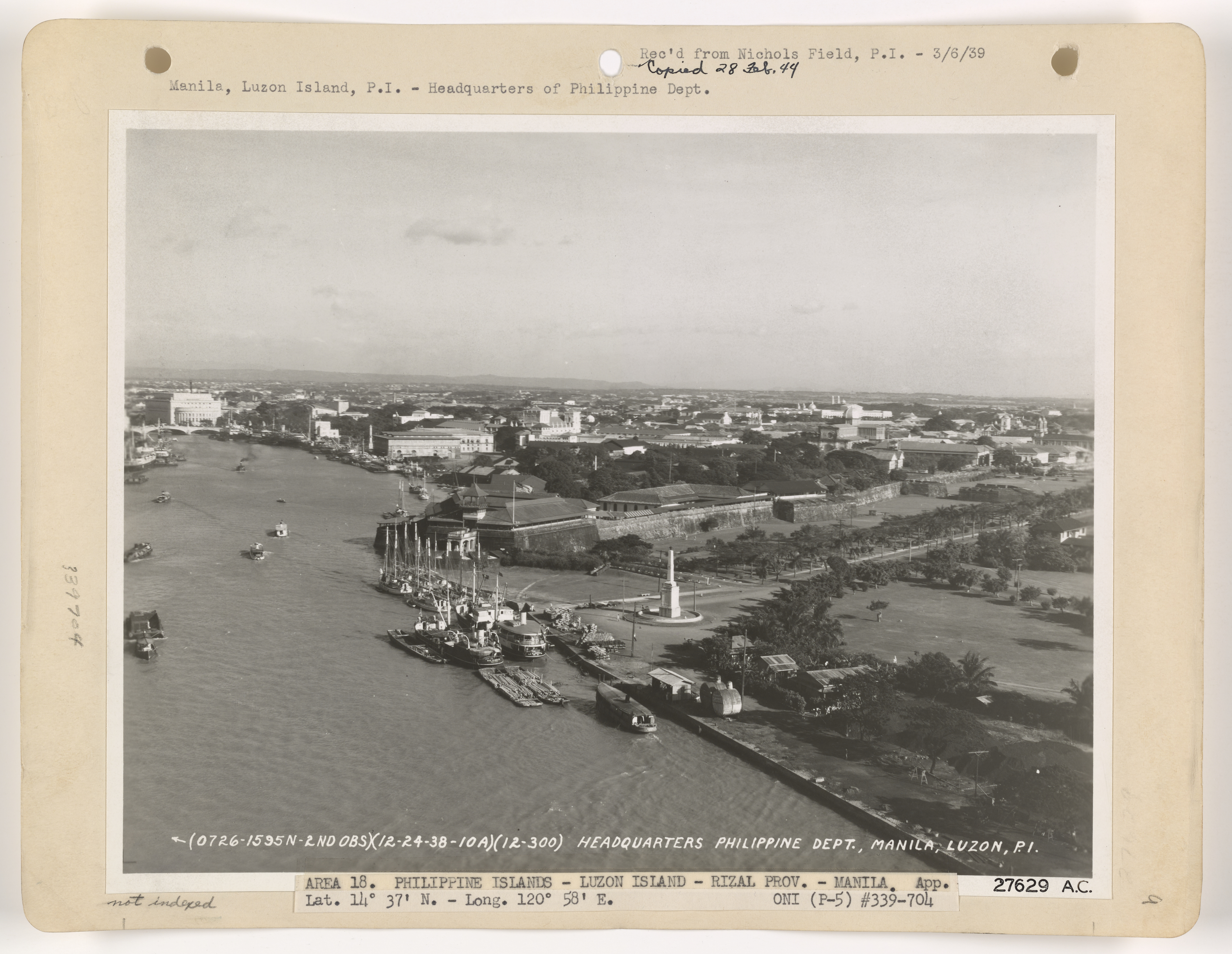
Aerial view of the headquarters of the Philippine Department in Manila, 1939

General Headquarters:

- Fort Santiago, Manila, Luzon

Troops:

- Field Hospital No. 4
- Ambulance Company Number 4
- Headquarters, Company K, 3d Engineers
- Headquarters, Company L, 3d Engineers
- Company F, Signal Corps
- Company L, Signal Corps
- 7th Cavalry Brigade
- 8th Cavalry Brigade
- 2nd Field Artillery Regiment (United States)
- Coast Defenses of Manila and Subic Bays
- 8th Infantry Regiment
- 13th Infantry Regiment
- 24th Infantry Regiment
- China Expedition - 15th Infantry

== Commanders of the Philippine Department ==
| From | To | Commander |
|---|---|---|
| 13 January 1911 | 5 March 1914 | Major General J. Franklin Bell |
| 5 March 1914 | 15 April 1916 | Major General Thomas H. Barry |
| 15 April 1916 | 15 April 1917 | Major General Hunter Liggett |
| 15 April 1917 | 5 August 1917 | Major General Charles J. Bailey |
| 5 August 1917 | 5 August 1918 | Brigadier General Robert K. Evans |
| 16 February 1919 | 23 November 1919 | Brigadier General Francis Henry French |
| 23 November 1919 | 6 March 1922 | Major General Francis J. Kernan |
| 6 March 1922 | 10 September 1922 | Major General William M. Wright |
| 10 September 1922 | 3 October 1922 | Major General Omar Bundy |
| 3 October 1922 | 18 November 1924 | Major General George W. Read |
| 18 November 1924 | 24 February 1926 | Major General James H. McRae |
| 25 February 1925 | 4 May 1926 | Major General William Weigel |
| 4 May 1926 | 30 April 1928 | Major General Fred W. Sladen |
| 30 April 1928 | 1 October 1928 | Major General William Lassiter |
| 1 October 1928 | 2 October 1930 | Major General Douglas MacArthur |
| 2 October 1930 | 9 April 1932 | Major General John L. Hines |
| 9 April 1932 | 7 September 1933 | Major General Ewing E. Booth |
| 7 September 1933 | 19 September 1933 | Brigadier General Stanley H. Ford |
| 19 September 1933 | 16 December 1933 | Brigadier General Frank S. Cocheu |
| 16 December 1933 | 11 December 1935 | Major General Frank Parker |
| 11 December 1935 | 13 February 1936 | Major General Charles E. Kilbourne |
| 13 February 1936 | 25 February 1938 | Major General Lucius Roy Holbrook |
| 26 February 1938 | 24 July 1939 | Major General John H. Hughes |
| 24 July 1939 | 10 June 1940 | Major General Walter S. Grant |
| 10 June 1940 | 1 November 1941 | Major General George Grunert |
| 1 November 1941 | 9 April 1942 | Lieutenant General Douglas MacArthur |

== Commanders US Army Forces in China ==
From April 1923 until March 1938, the department was in command of U.S. Army Forces in China.

| From | To | Commander |
|---|---|---|
| 1 April 1923 | May 1926 | Brig. Gen. William D. Connor |
| May 1926 | 14 April 1929 | Brig. Gen. Joseph C. Castner |
| 15 April 1929 | 27 June 1932 | Col. James D. Taylor |
| 27 June 1932 | 7 July 1935 | Col. Reynolds J. Burt |
| 7 July 1935 | 14 May 1937 | Col. George A. Lynch |
| 14 May 1937 | 15 March 1938 | Col. Joseph A. McAndrew |

== US Army Troops – Philippines – 31 July 1941 ==
At the time of USAFFE's formation the force consisted of 22,532 troops. Of the 1,340 officers, 775 were reservists. 7,293 troops were assigned to the infantry and 4,967 were assigned to the Harbor Defenses of Manila and Subic Bays. About 2,500 troops served in a service or supply position, mainly quartermaster or medical units. The majority of the department's troops were stationed on Luzon.

Total Strength: 22,532 (1,434 officers, 21,098 enlisted, including 11,937 Philippine Scouts).

- USAFFE Headquarters, Manila (5)
- Philippine Department Headquarters, Fort William McKinley (289)
- Philippine Division (10,473)
- 26th Cavalry Regiment (PS) (838)
- 43d Infantry Regiment (PS) (329)
- 60th Coast Artillery AA
- 86th Field Artillery Regiment (PS) (388)
- 88th Field Artillery Regiment (PS) (518)
- 808th Military Police Company (69)
- Harbor Defenses of Manila and Subic Bays (5,360)
- Philippine Army Air Corps (2,407)
- Service Detachments (1,836)
- Other (20)

== Casualty count ==
Ref: American Battlefield Monuments Commission

- {For reference only. PS=Philippine Scouts}

=== Philippine Forces ===
| Unit | 1941–1945 | 1946 |
| 1st Training Squadron | | |
| 1st Philippine Coast Artillery Regt | 1 | |
| 2nd Philippine Coast Artillery | 5 | 1 |
| 1st Philippine Regular Division: | | |
| • 1st Philippine Infantry Regiment | | |
| • 2nd Philippine Infantry Regiment | | |
| • 3rd Philippine Infantry Regiment | | 3 |
| 2nd Philippine Division (Philippine Constabulary): | | |
| • 1st Regiment Philippine Constabulary | | |
| • 2nd Regiment Philippine Constabulary | | |
| • 3rd Regiment Philippine Constabulary | | |
| • 4th Regiment Philippine Constabulary | | |
| • 4th Veterinary Company (PS). | 5 | |
| 5th Photo Detachment | | |
| 6th Pursuit Squadron | 1 | |
| 9th Observation Squadron | | |
| 10th Fighter-Bomber Squadron | | |
| 1st Philippine Division: | | |
| • 11th Infantry Regiment | | |
| • 12th Infantry Regiment | 2 | |
| • 13th Infantry Regiment | | |
| 12th Ordnance Company (PS) | 45 | |
| 12th Signal Regiment (PS) | | |
| 12th Signal Company (PS) | 77 | |
| 12th Medical Regiment(PS) | 13 | |
| 12th Medical Battalion(PS) | 12 | |
| 12th Military Police Company (PS) | 40 | |
| 12th Quartermaster Regiment (PS) | 90 | |
| 12th Quartermaster Battalion(PS) | 73 | |
| 14th Engineer Regiment (PS) | 324 | |
| 21st Philippine Division | 1 | |
| • 21st Engineer Battalion | 2 | |
| • 21st Field Artillery Regiment | 3 | |
| • 21st Infantry Regiment | 3 | |
| • 22nd Infantry Regiment | 3 | |
| • 23rd Infantry Regiment | 3 | |
| 23rd Field Artillery Regiment (PS). | 161 | |
| 24th Field Artillery Regiment (PS) | 310 | |
| 25th Field Artillery Regiment | | |
| 26th Cavalry Regiment (PS) | 264 | 37 |
| 26th Infantry Regiment (PS) | 1 | |
| 31st Philippine Division: | | |
| • 31st Engineer Battalion | 1 | |
| • 31st Field Artillery Regiment | 2 | |
| • 31st Infantry Regiment | 6 | |
| • 32nd Infantry regiment | 3 | |
| 34th Quartermaster Co (PS) | 6 | 2 |
| 41st Division (Philippines) : | | |
| • {General Officers} | 1 | |
| • 41st Engineer Battalion | 1 | |
| • 41st Infantry Regiment | 5 | 1 |
| • 42nd Infantry Regiment | 4 | |
| 43rd Infantry Regiment (PS) | 28 | 3 |
| 45th Infantry Regiment (PS) | 983 | 58 |
| • 47th Infantry Regiment (Provisional) | | 1 |
| 47th Motor Transport Co | 1 | |
| 51st Division (Philippines): | | |
| • 51st Field Artillery Regiment | 4 | |
| • 51st Infantry Regiment | 4 | |
| • 52nd Infantry Regiment | 4 | |
| • 53rd Infantry Regiment | 4 | |
| • 54th Infantry Regiment (Provisional) | | 1 |
| • 57th Infantry Regiment (PS) | 878 | 105 |
| 59th Coast Artillery Regiment | 1 | |
| 61st Division (Philippines): | | |
| • 61st Field Artillery Regiment | 3 | |
| • 62nd Infantry Regiment | 4 | |
| • 63rd Infantry Regiment | 1 | |
| 65th Quartermaster Troops {PS} | 18 | |
| 66th Quartermaster Troops {PS} | 18 | 3 |
| 71st Philippine Division: | | |
| • 71st Engineer Battalion | 10 | |
| • 71st Field Artillery Regiment | 1 | |
| • 71st Infantry Regiment | 2 | |
| • 72nd Infantry Regiment | 6 | |
| • 73rd Infantry Regiment. | 3 | |
| • 75th Infantry Regiment (Provisional) | 1 | |
| 74th Philippine Infantry Regiment (Provisional) | 1 | |
| 74th Quartermaster Baking Co {PS} | 17 | |
| 76th Ordnance Company | | |
| 81st Philippine Division: | | |
| • 86th Field Artillery Battalion (PS) | 154 | 7 |
| • 86th Field Artillery Regiment (PS) | 8 | |
| • 88th Field Artillery Battalion (PS) | 3 | |
| • 88th Field Artillery Regiment (PS) | 175 | 13 |
| 91st Philippine Division: | | |
| • 91st Infantry Regiment | 1 | |
| • 91st Coast Artillery Regiment(PS) | 198 | 5 |
| • 92nd Coast Artillery Regiment(PS) | 191 | 9 |
| 101st Philippine Division: | | |
| 102nd Philippine Division: | | |
| 120th Ordnance Company (PS) | 1 | |
| 252nd Signal Const. Com. (PS) | 44 | |
| Special Troops | | |

=== United States forces ===
US Army
| Unit | 1941–1945 | 1946 |
|---|---|---|
| 4th Chemical Co (Aviation) | 35 | |
| 4th Composite Group | | |
| 6th Field Artillery Regiment | | |
| 20th Air Base Group | | |
| 27th Air Material Squadron | 73 | 2 |
| 28th Air Material Squadron | 90 | 2 |
| 19th Air Base Squadron | 1 | |
| 28th Bombardment Squadron | 124 | 8 |
| 31st Infantry Regiment | 914 | 24 |
| 50th Coast Artillery Regiment | 7 | |
| 59th Coast Artillery Regiment | 307 | 6 (+1, 1948) |
| 60th Coast Artillery (AA) Regiment | 387 | 3 |
| 75th Ordnance Deport Company | 3 | |
| 75th Ordnance Company | 35 | |
| 192nd Tank Battalion | 188 | 1 |
| 194th Tank Battalion | 183 | |
| 200th Coast Artillery (AA) Regiment | 374 | |
| 515th Coastal Artillery | 206 | 1 |
| 803rd Engineer Aviation Battalion | 232 | |
| 808th Military Police Company | 89 | 1 |

US Navy and USMC
| Type | Navy | USMC |
|---|---|---|
| KIA | 337 | 89 |
| Wounded died later | 2 | |
| Died POW | 630 | 413 |
| Invalided from Service | 3 | 1 |

The Marines were from the 4th Marines.

=== US Navy casualties/losses ===
Motor Torpedo Boat Squadron Three:
• PT-34: 2 killed 3 wounded
• Houston (CA-30) : 693 fatalities
• USS Asheville: 160 fatalities {No survivors by Wars end}
• USS Oahu: 55 fatalities {No Survivors}

== Patch of the Philippine Department ==
All units of the department wore the Philippine Department shoulder sleeve insignia, with the exception of the Philippine Division, which wore their own patch: a golden carabao on a red shield.

Officially, the Philippine Department's insignia featured the Philippine Sea Lion, in white, superimposed on a blue oval with a height of 2.5 inches. The Sea Lion is derived from the coat of arms of Manila. The Philippine Department and Philippine Division insignia were both approved on 8 July 1922.

== See also ==
- Far East Air Force (United States)
- Military history of the Philippines
- Military history of the United States
