= General French =

General French may refer to:

- Francis Henry French (1857–1921), U.S. Army major general
- George Arthur French (1841–1921), British Army major general
- John French, 1st Earl of Ypres (1852–1925), British Army general
- Samuel Gibbs French (1818–1910), Confederate States Army major general
- William H. French (1815–1881), U.S. Army major general

== See also ==
- Category:French generals
