= 12th Quartermaster Regiment =

The 12th Quartermaster Regiment was a regiment of the United States which was charged with quartermaster duties such as supplying all necessary ordnance, food, clothing, and supplies to the Philippine Division. Their colors were the only ones saved – entrusted to one of the "Angels of Bataan" who tricked a captor into thinking they were a cape and saved them through more than three years of internment – after the Division was forced to surrender after the invasion of the Philippines by the Japanese forces during World War II.
