= USS General William Weigel =

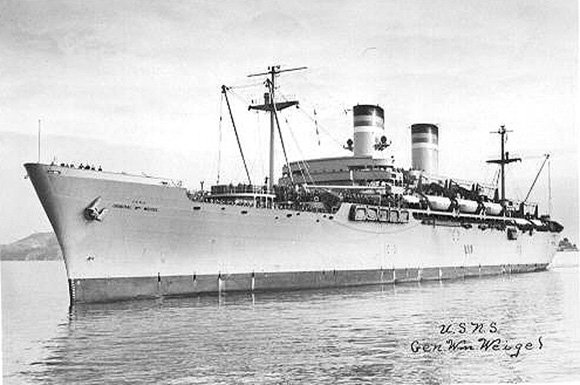
- USNS General William Weigel (T-AP-119) in the Korean War

History

United States
- Name: USS General William Weigel
- Namesake: General William Weigel, US Army
- Builder: Federal Shipbuilding & Drydock
- Laid down: 15 March 1944
- Launched: 3 September 1944
- Sponsored by: Mrs Earl L. Mann, a niece of General Weigel
- Acquired: 4 January 1945
- Commissioned: 6 January 1945 – 10 May 1946; Mid-1946 – 1950 (US Army); 1 August 1950 – 12 June 1958
- Recommissioned: August 1965
- Decommissioned: 31 March 1986
- Reclassified: T-AP-117 (1 August 1950)
- Stricken: 31 March 1986
- Identification: MC hull type P2-S2-R2, MC hull no. 677; IMO number: 8424642
- Honors and awards: Seven service stars for the Korean War service and one for the Vietnam War
- Fate: Scrapped 1987, Taiwan

General characteristics
- Class & type: General John Pope-class transport
- Displacement: 11,450 tons (lt); 20,175 tons fully laden
- Length: 622 feet 7 inches (189.76 m)
- Beam: 75 feet 6 inches (23.01 m)
- Draft: 25 feet 6 inches (7.77 m)
- Installed power: 17,000 shp
- Propulsion: turbo-electric transmission, twin screw
- Speed: 21 knots (39 km/h)
- Capacity: 4,244
- Complement: 533
- Armament: 4 x single 5"/38 caliber dual purpose guns, 4 x quad 1.1" guns, replaced by 20 x single 20mm guns

USS General William Weigel (AP-119) was a troopship that served with the United States Navy in World War II. After the war, she was acquired by the US Army and became USAT General William Weigel. On the outbreak of the Korean War, she was transferred to the Military Sea Transportation Service (MSTS) and designated USNS General William Weigel (T-AP-119), a designation she retained for her later service in the Vietnam War.

AP-119 was laid down under Maritime Commission contract 15 March 1944 by the Federal Shipbuilding & Dry Dock Company of Kearny, New Jersey; named General C. H. Barth (AP-119) on 15 April 1944; renamed General William Weigel 24 August 1944; launched 3 September 1944; acquired by the Navy 4 January 1945; and commissioned at Bayonne, New Jersey, 6 January 1945.

== World War II ==
General William Weigel sailed from New York 11 February 1945 with 5,000 rotation troops; and, after delivering them safely to Le Havre, embarked US and French veterans at Southampton and returned to New York 19 April. Underway again 1 May with Navy men bound for Puerto Rico, the troopship touched at San Juan to debark them and to take on 5,000 Army fighting men for passage to Hawaii.

As General William Weigel was steaming toward Pearl Harbor, one of her passengers became critically ill. To save his life, strict radio silence was broken to arrange a mid-ocean rendezvous with a seaplane out of Balboa. He was transferred to the seaplane 19 May and flown to a hospital; General William Weigel reached Honolulu 6 days later.

This far ranging ship sailed 28 May for Marseille to embark 5,000 soldiers and transferred them to Eniwetok and Manila to take part in the climactic Pacific battles. Subsequently, she loaded passengers at Leyte and returned via Ulithi to moor at San Pedro, California, 25 August 1945.

=== After hostilities ===
As part of the Magic Carpet fleet, she stood out from San Diego, California 11 September with rotation troops for Pearl Harbor and returned to San Francisco 24 September with 5,000 veterans. From 6 October 1945 to 8 February 1946, she made three round-trip trans-Pacific voyages (two out of San Francisco and the third from Seattle) to bring occupation troops to Yokohama.

Following a Magic Carpet voyage to Manila and back to San Francisco 11 April 1946, the transport departed San Francisco 16 April for New York, arriving 1 May. Decommissioned there 10 May 1946, she was transferred to the War Department for peacetime operations as an Army transport and made shuttle runs with troops and supplies from San Francisco to garrisons in the Pacific until reacquired by the Navy 20 July 1950. General William Weigel was assigned to MSTS 1 August 1950, and redesignated USNS General William Weigel (T-AP-119).

== Korean War ==
In this phase of her career, the ship sailed from the Pacific coast to Japan and Korea carrying troops for duty in the Korean War. She continued to rotate American troops to strengthen the United Nations position in Korea until she was placed in Reduced Operational Status in 1955.

General William Weigel was returned to the Maritime Commission 12 June 1958 and entered the National Defense Reserve Fleet at Olympia, Washington.

== Vietnam War ==
She was reacquired by the Navy 18 August 1965 and assigned to MSTS as the Navy bolstered its support forces for the Vietnam War. On 9 December 1965 she departed US Army Oakland California Terminal with elements of the 20th Engineer Battalion arriving at Cam Ranh Bay on 1 January 1966. She departed US Naval Base San Diego on 18 February 1966 with elements of 3rd Battalion, 1st Regiment, 3rd Marine Division, arriving at US Naval Base Pearl Harbor Hawaii on 5 March. The following day she was boarded by elements of the 25th Infantry Division at Pearl Harbor and departed on 6 March. USNS Weigel disembarked US Army troops at the port of Vũng Tàu on 12 March and two days later US Marines at Danang on 14 March 1966. In early August 1966 she transported a replacement draft of U.S. Marines from San Diego, CA to Danang. On 28 September 1966 she departed the US Army Oakland California terminal carrying various units of the 54th Transportation Battalion including the 523rd Transportation Company. On 20 October 1966, elements of the 585th Transportation Group disembarked at Cam Ranh Bay. Three days later, on 23 October 1966, the 523rd Transportation Company disembarked in Qui Nhơn harbor. On 21 March 1967, Weigel landed the 6th Battalion, 32nd Artillery in Qui Nhơn.

On her final voyage, Weigel departed US Army Oakland California Terminal on 3 October 1967 with elements of the 324th Signal Brigade and 3rd Battalion 506th Infantry, 101st Airborne Division, the 3rd Battalion (Abn) 503rd Infantry Regiment, 82d Airborne Division, reassigned to the 173rd Airborne Brigade and the 201st Aviation Company (Corps) out of Fort Bragg, NC to be located at Nha Trang, disembarking at Cam Ranh Bay on 26 October 1967. From there she made three more stops up the coast of Vietnam with her final stop being at Da Nang, where she moored in the harbor and disembarked by landing craft the US Army's 51st Civil Affairs Platoon of the 29th Civil Affairs Company, to be under the operational command of the 3rd Marine Amphibious Force. The eight men of the 51st Civil Affairs Platoon, the smallest tactical unit in the US Army at the time, were the last troops delivered to a war zone by Weigel in her long and far-ranging career as a troopship, with PFC Fred Jablonsky of New York City being the last to leave the ship. She carried troops to the Vietnam War from 1965 through 1967.

The Weigel's final voyage may have actually begun on December 7, 1967, Pearl Harbor Day. Still a troop ship, she departed Pier 39 at Pearl Harbor around midnight, carrying almost half of the 11th Infantry Brigade soldiers to Vietnam. Colonel Oran K Henderson flew ahead with the advance party a week earlier and other half of unit had departed day earlier by another troop ship. She arrived in the Port of Qui Nhon on December 22, 1967, but since piers were all tied up, troops did not disembark until 11pm the next day. Once there, the troops disembarked the Weigel and they went to Phù Cát Air Base and flew on C-130s north to Đức Phổ Base Camp. Some elements then trucked up to Chu Lai and the Americal Division [23rd Infantry] was formed from the 11th, 196th and 198th light infantry brigades. The Weigel was used to ferry Korean troops to and from Vietnam in 1967 and the early part of 1968 before sailing to San Francisco.

== Final decommission ==
General William Weigel was placed out of service and struck from the Naval Register on 31 March 1986. She was sold for scrapping on 10 April 1987 for $1,005,050, and scrapped in Taiwan later that year.

== Awards ==
- American Campaign Medal
- European-African-Middle Eastern Campaign Medal
- World War II Victory Medal
- Navy Occupation Medal with "ASIA" clasp
- National Defense Service Medal with star
- Korean Service Medal with seven battle stars
- Vietnam Service Medal with one battle star
- United Nations Service Medal
- Korean War Service Medal (Korea)
- Republic of Vietnam Campaign Medal
