= Alfred T. Smith =

U.S. Army brigadier general (1874–1939)

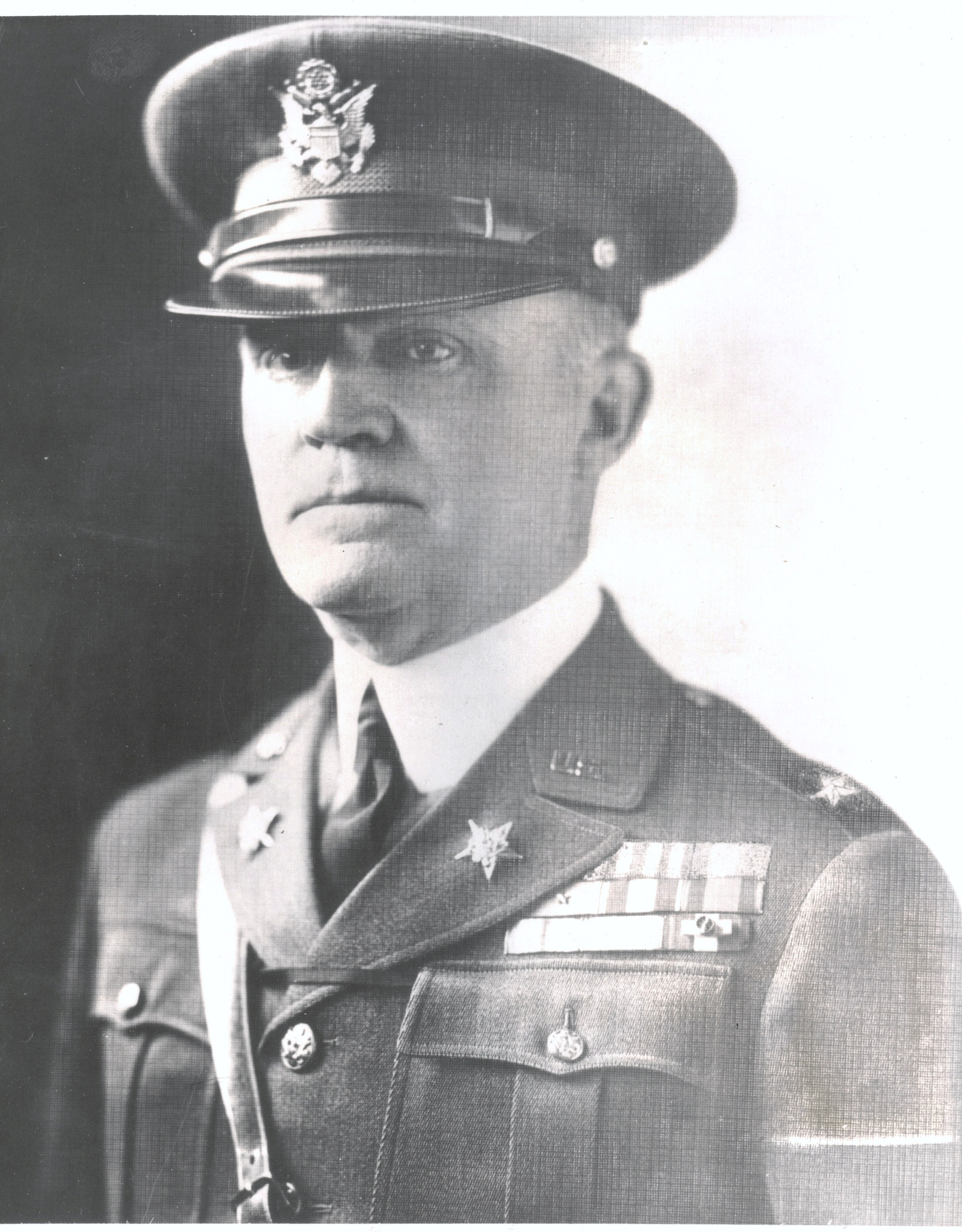
- Smith as commander of the 3rd Infantry Division in 1937
- Born: November 25, 1874; Washington, D.C., U.S.
- Died: November 27, 1939 (aged 65); Washington, D.C.
- Burial place: Arlington National Cemetery
- Spouse: Annie Y. Pike (m. 1903-1939, his death)
- Military career
- Allegiance: United States
- Branch: United States Army
- Service years: 1894-1938
- Rank: Brigadier General
- Unit: U.S. Army Infantry Branch
- Commands: Company E, 12th Infantry Regiment; Company I, 12th Infantry Regiment; 54th Infantry Regiment; 34th Infantry Regiment; 18th Infantry Brigade, 9th Infantry Division; Philippine Division; 3rd Infantry Division
- Conflicts: Spanish–American War; Philippine–American War; Pancho Villa Expedition; World War I
- Awards: Silver Star; Order of the Crown of Italy (Commander)

Alfred T. Smith (November 25, 1874 – November 27, 1939) was a career officer in the United States Army. A veteran of the Spanish–American War, Philippine–American War, and World War I, he attained the rank of brigadier general and was most notable for his command of the Philippine Division (1935–1937) and the 3rd Infantry Division (1937–1938).

== Early life ==
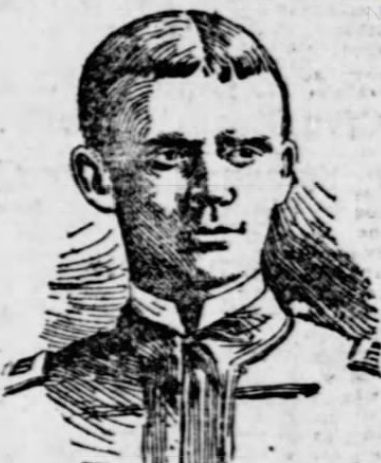
Smith as a high school senior in 1894

Alfred T. Smith was born in Washington, D.C., on November 25, 1874, the son of Theodore Smith (1846–1884) and Lydia Smith (1854–1918). Smith's father was a first lieutenant in the 15th Infantry Regiment, and Smith's desire for a military career was known among friends and family from an early age. He attended the public schools of Washington, and was an 1894 graduate of Central High School. While in high school, Smith joined the High School Cadets, an organization which took part in military drill and ceremony competitions. He commanded the regiment's Company D with the rank of captain, and his company won the city's annual contest in May 1894.

== Start of career ==
In September, 1894 Smith enlisted in the United States Army as a private with the intention of qualifying for an officer's commission. Assigned to Company H, 6th Infantry Regiment, Smith served at Fort Thomas, Kentucky and attained the rank of sergeant. He performed well on his 1896 competitive examination, and when he was nominated in 1897 for appointment as a second lieutenant, the members of his company demonstrated their esteem by presenting him with an officer's sword and the uniform insignia of his new rank.

In May 1897, Smith received his second lieutenant's commission in the Infantry branch. He was assigned to the 12th Infantry Regiment at Fort Niobrara, Nebraska. During the Spanish–American War, Smith served in Cuba with the 12th Infantry. He took part in the Battle of El Caney and the Siege of Santiago. After the war, he received promotion to first lieutenant by brevet in recognition of his gallantry. He received promotion to permanent first lieutenant in March 1899.

== Continued career ==
After his service in Cuba, Smith was assigned to the 12th Infantry in the Philippines during the Philippine–American War. His posting included leading the effort to reestablish civil government in San Miguel, Bulacan. During his service in the Philippines, Smith was commended twice for heroism and was recommended for promotion to brevet captain.

Smith was recommended for promotion to permanent captain in February 1902. He briefly commanded Company E, 12th Infantry at Fort Douglas, Utah and in May 1902 was transferred to command of the regiment's Company I at Fort Bliss, Texas. In 1904, Smith commanded Company L when an ad hoc battalion of 12th Infantry units deployed for service in the Philippines.

After leaving the Philippines in 1906, Smith remained with the 12th Infantry, this time assigned to Fort Niagara, New York. In 1909, Smith returned to the Philippines with the 12th Infantry. This posting also included temporary detached duty in Nagasaki. By the time the 12th Infantry returned to the United States in 1912, Smith was serving as the regimental adjutant.

Smith remained with the 12th Infantry, this time assigned to the Presidio of Monterey, California. In 1914, he was designated to take the course at the School of the Line at Fort Leavenworth, Kansas. He graduated in 1914 and performed temporary duty with the 12th Infantry at the Presidio of San Francisco before returning to the School of the Line to serve on the faculty. He then returned to the 12th Infantry, this time on the Texas-Mexico border during the Pancho Villa Expedition.

== World War I ==
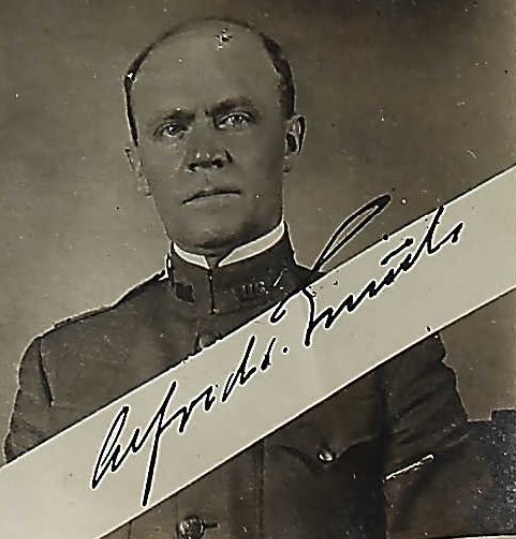
Smith's 1919 passport photo

In July 1916, Smith was promoted to major. In September, he was assigned to Ohio State University as professor of military science.

From 1917 to 1919, Smith was the U.S. military attaché in Argentina, and was assigned to duty in Buenos Aires. During the war, Smith was promoted to temporary lieutenant colonel, then temporary colonel. In 1919, he traveled to Europe and performed unspecified special duty in the Netherlands. After returning, he was assigned as commander of the 54th Infantry Regiment at Camp Grant, Illinois.

== Later career ==
In 1920, Smith was assigned as a student United States Army War College. While taking this course, Smith reverted to his permanent rank of major, and was quickly promoted to permanent lieutenant colonel and permanent colonel. In 1921, he was assigned as a student at the United States Army Command and General Staff College.

After graduating from the Staff College in 1922, Smith was assigned to duty with the Organized Reserve Corps on the staff of the Third Corps Area at Fort Howard, Maryland. In 1928, Smith was assigned to command the 34th Infantry Regiment at Fort Eustis, Virginia.

Smith was chief of the War Department's Military Intelligence Division from January 3, 1931 to January 2, 1935. He was promoted to brigadier general in January 1932. From February to May 1935, Smith was assigned to Fort Devens, Massachusetts as commander of the 18th Infantry Brigade, a unit of the 9th Infantry Division.

From June 1935 to January 1937, Smith commanded the Philippine Division. From July 1937 to January 1938, he commanded the 3rd Infantry Division at Fort Lewis, Washington. Smith left the Army for disability in May 1938, a few months before reaching the mandatory retirement age of 64.

== Later life ==
By virtue of his service in the Philippines, Smith was a member of the Military Order of the Carabao.

In retirement, Smith was a resident of Washington, D.C. He died at Walter Reed Army Medical Center on November 27, 1939. Smith was buried at Arlington National Cemetery.

== Awards ==
Smith received the Citation Star for his heroism in Cuba. When the Army created the Silver Star decoration in 1918, Smith's award was converted to the new medal. He was also a recipient of the Order of the Crown of Italy (Commander), which was presented by the King of Italy to recognize his services on that country's behalf during World War I.

== Family ==
On February 24, 1903, Smith married Annie Y. Pike (1879–1952), the granddaughter of Albert Pike. They were married until his death and had no children.

Smith had one sister, Frances (1877–1940). She was the wife of Army Colonel Glenn Hedges Davis (1869–1922).
