= John H. Hughes (United States Army officer) =

U.S. Army major general

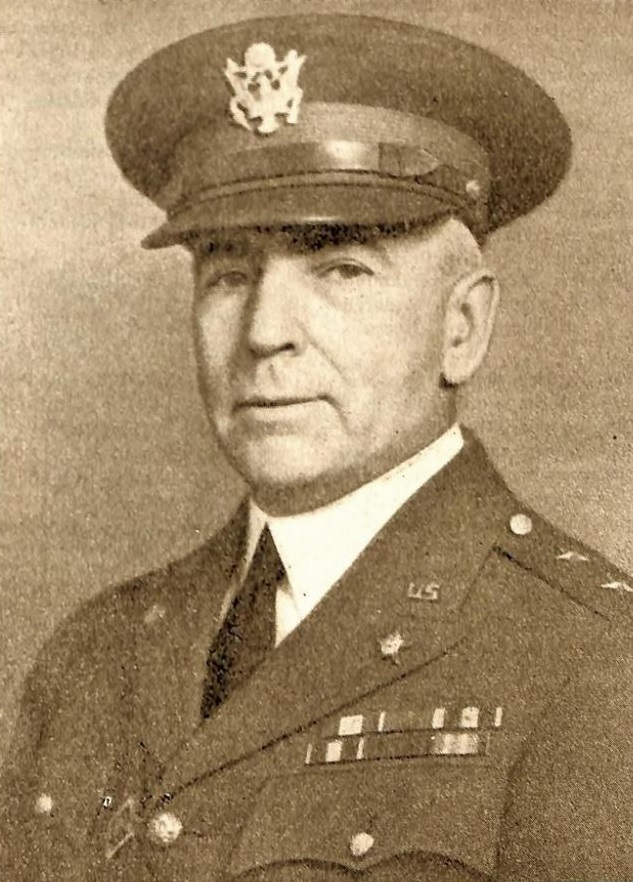
- Hughes as the Army's Assistant Chief of Staff for Operations and Training in 1936
- Born: February 4, 1876; New York City, U.S.
- Died: August 6, 1953 (aged 77); Washington, D.C., U.S.
- Burial place: Arlington National Cemetery
- Military career
- Allegiance: United States
- Branch: United States Army
- Service years: 1897–1940; 1941–1945
- Rank: Major General
- Unit: U.S. Army Infantry Branch
- Commands: 26th Infantry Regiment; 18th Infantry Regiment; 14th Infantry Brigade, 7th Infantry Division; Fort Snelling; Philippine Division; Fort William McKinley; Philippine Department; 2nd Coast Artillery District
- Conflicts: Spanish–American War; Philippine–American War; World War I World War II
- Awards: Army Distinguished Service Medal; Silver Star; Purple Heart; French Order of the Black Star (Commander)

John H. Hughes (February 4, 1876 – August 6, 1953) was a career officer in the United States Army. He attained the rank of major general, and was most notable for his command of the Philippine Division (1937–1938) and the Philippine Department (1938–1939). A veteran of the Spanish–American War, Philippine–American War, and World War I, Hughes served for 43 years beginning 1897. After retiring in 1940, he was recalled to active duty for World War II and served at the Department of War from 1941 to 1945.

After he retired for the second time, Hughes was a resident of Washington, D.C. He died in Washington on August 6, 1953, and was buried at Arlington National Cemetery.

== Early life ==
John Hendricken Hughes was born in New York City on February 4, 1876, a son of Bernard Hughes and Kate C. Hughes. He was raised and educated in New York City. In 1893, Hughes began attendance at the United States Military Academy. He graduated in 1897 ranked 31st of 67.

== Start of career ==
In June 1897, Hughes was appointed a second lieutenant of Infantry and assigned to the 17th Infantry Regiment. In August he was assigned to the 4th Infantry Regiment and posted to Fort Sheridan, Illinois. During the Spanish–American War, Hughes served with the 4th Infantry in Cuba, and was wounded at the July 1, 1898 Battle of El Caney. After convalescent leave, he returned to duty at Fort Sheridan. Hughes received the Citation Star for heroism at El Caney. When the Army created the Silver Star in 1918, Hughes' award was converted to the new medal.

In March, 1899 Hughes arrived in Manila for duty during the Philippine–American War. He served in several battles with the 26th Infantry Regiment and took part in a number of expeditions into the rural areas outside Manila, and was promoted to first lieutenant in March 1899. From March 1901 to March 1902 he was the regiment's commissary officer. In March 1902, Hughes was promoted to captain. In June, he transferred to the 4th Infantry Regiment. After returning to the United States, in May 1902 he was assigned with his regiment at Fort Clark, Texas.

From August to March 1903, Hughes performed temporary recruiting duty in New York City. He then served briefly at Fort Brown, Texas before departing again for duty in the Philippines. He served with the 4th Infantry at Nueva Cáceres and Legazpi until May 1905. After extended leave in Japan, he returned to the United States in July 1905 and was assigned to duty at the Presidio of San Francisco until September 1905. As commissary officer of the 4th Infantry, Hughes served at Fort Thomas, Kentucky from September 1905 to February 1908.

== Continued career ==
From April 1908 to May 1910, Hughes served in the Philippines and was stationed at Camp Jossman. In October 1910, he joined the 4th Infantry at Fort Crook, Nebraska. In December 1910, he was assigned to temporary duty as a commissary officer, and he performed duty at Fort Riley, Kansas (December 1910 to January 1911), Fort D. A. Russell, Wyoming (January to March 1911), Galveston, Texas (March to June 1911), San Antonio, Texas (June to July 1911), Fort D. A. Russell, Wyoming (July 1911 to June 1912), and West Point, New York (June to December 1912).

In December 1912, Hughes was relieved from commissary officer duty and joined the 3rd Infantry Regiment as commander of a company stationed at Madison Barracks, New York. He was assigned as regimental adjutant at Fort Slocum, New York in May 1916, and promoted to major in July 1916. He performed temporary recruiting duty in New York City from September 1916 to August 1917.

== World War I ==
In September 1917, Hughes was promoted to temporary lieutenant colonel and detailed to temporary inspector general duty. From September to December 1917, he was the post inspector at Camp Sherman Ohio In December 1917 he embarked for France, and after arriving he was assigned to staff duty in the office of the inspector general for the American Expeditionary Force's Line of Communications. In late January 1918, Hughes was promoted to temporary colonel and assigned as inspector general of the AEF's Services of Supply. His wartime service was recognized with award of the Army Distinguished Service Medal.

== Post-World War I ==
In August 1919, Hughes returned to his permanent rank of major. From August 1919 to July 1920, he was a student at the School of the Line (now the United States Army Command and General Staff College, and he completed the course as a distinguished graduate. He was promoted to permanent lieutenant colonel in June 1920, and permanent colonel the following month. Hughes attended the General Staff School from July 1920 to June 1921. After graduation, he was assigned to the school as an instructor.

From September 1922 to September 1925, Hughes served as executive officer for the Army's Chief of Infantry. After completing the Infantry Refresher Course in the fall of 1925, Hughes was assigned command of the 26th Infantry Regiment at Plattsburgh Barracks, New York. He led his regiment from December 1925 to September 1927. In October 1927, Hughes was assigned as chief of staff for the First Corps Area, which was headquartered in Boston.

From July to October 1931, Hughes commanded the 18th Infantry Regiment at Fort Hamilton, New York and Fort Dix, New Jersey. In October 1931, he was promoted to brigadier general. From October 1931 to July 1933 he commanded the 7th Infantry Division's 14th Infantry Brigade and the post at Fort Snelling, Minnesota. From July 1933 to April 1937, Hughes was the Army's assistant chief of staff for training and operations (G-3). He was promoted to major general in October 1936.

Hughes commanded the Philippine Division and Fort William McKinley from July 1937 to February 1938. From February 1938 to July 1939, he commanded the Philippine Department. After returning to the United States, Hughes was on extended leave. From January to February 1940, he commanded the 2nd Coast Artillery District at Governors Island. Hughes retired in February 1940 after reaching the mandatory retirement age of 64.

== World War II ==
Hughes was recalled to active duty for World War II. Returned to service in September 1941, he was initially assigned as a member of an Army board created to review the service records of officers on active duty and determine which would be retained in the service and which would be discharged. Beginning in February 1942, he was a member and secretary of the Secretary of War's Personnel Board, which reviewed and made recommendations on requests for officer appointments and promotions. He retired again in February 1945.

== Later life ==
Hughes did not marry, and had no children. He died at Walter Reed Army Medical Center in Washington, D.C., on August 6, 1953. He was buried at Arlington National Cemetery, and several of his West Point classmates served as pallbearers. Hughes had eight siblings (three sisters and five brothers), all of whom attended his funeral.

== Awards ==
In addition to the Silver Star for his Spanish–American War service and Army Distinguished Service Medal for World War I, Hughes received the Purple Heart for his wound at the Battle of El Caney. In addition, he received the French Order of the Black Star (Commander) in recognition of his wartime service in France.
