= Maxon S. Lough =

United States Army general (1886–1964)

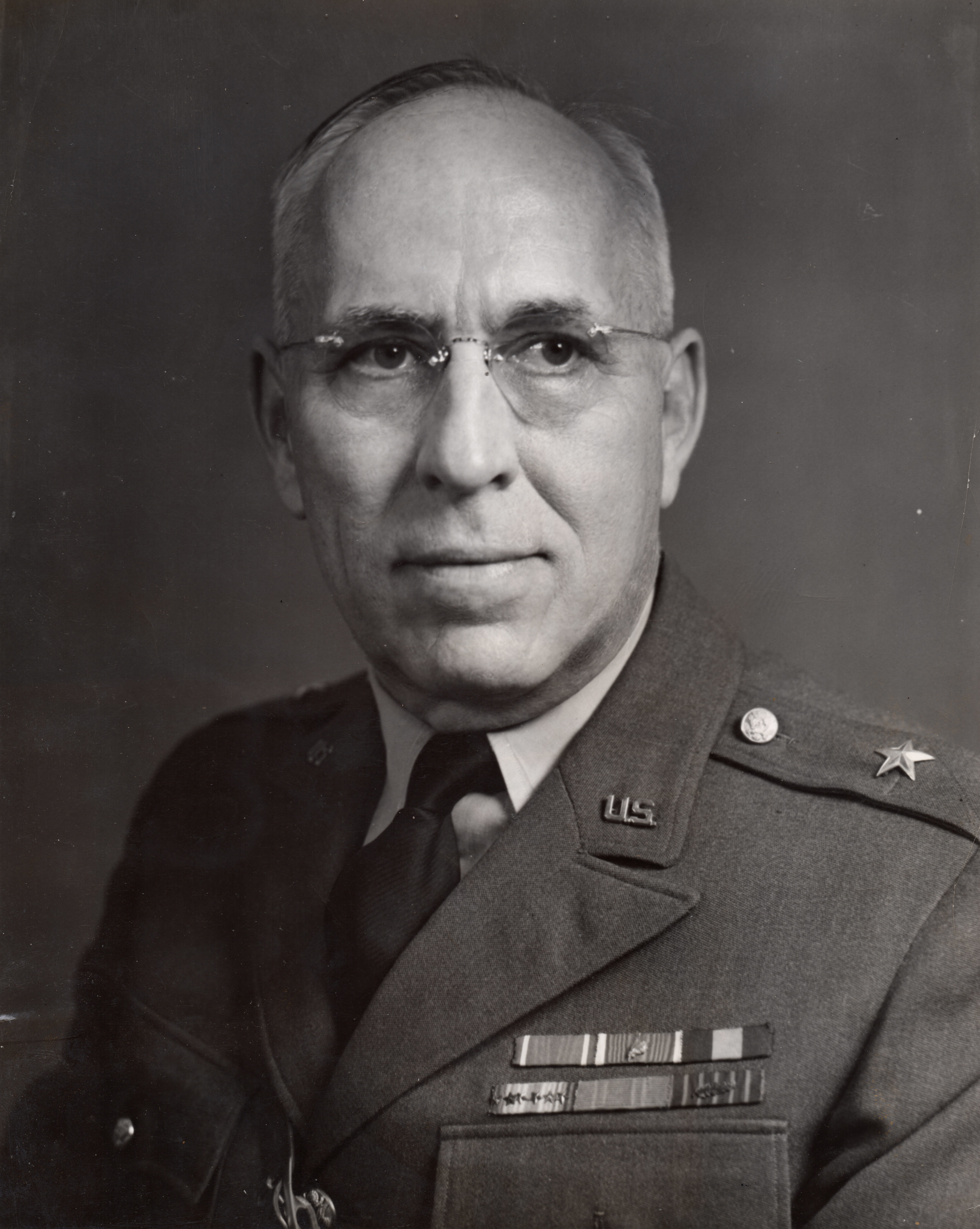
- Lough c. 1942
- Born: September 5, 1886; Fargo, North Dakota, US
- Died: July 13, 1964 (aged 77); Palo Alto, California, US
- Burial place: Arlington National Cemetery
- Military career
- Allegiance: United States of America
- Branch: United States Army
- Service years: 1908–1946
- Rank: Brigadier General
- Conflicts: Philippine–American War; World War I World War II
- Awards: Distinguished Service Cross; Distinguished Service Medal; Purple Heart (2)

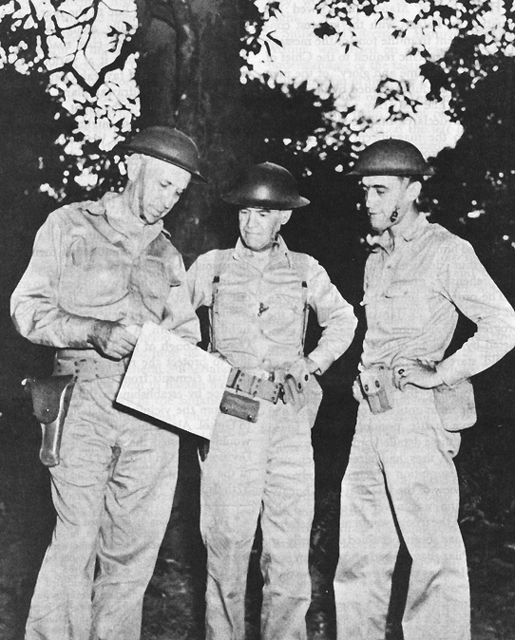
General Lough, left, with Col. Harrison C. Browne and Capt. Joseph B. Sallee, during the Battle of Bataan

Maxon Spafford Lough (September 15, 1886 – July 13, 1964) was an American brigadier general and commanded the Philippine Division during the Battle of Bataan in World War II.

Lough served in the Philippine Constabulary from January 1908 to August 1911. He was commissioned as a second lieutenant of the U.S. Army Infantry in December 1911.

During World War I, Lough served as a major with the 38th Infantry Regiment, 3rd Division in France. He was awarded the Distinguished Service Cross and two Purple Hearts.

After the war, Lough graduated from the Infantry School advanced course in 1923, the Command and General Staff School in 1924 and the Army War College in 1928. He was promoted to lieutenant colonel in August 1935 and colonel in September 1940.

Sent to the Philippines, Lough received a temporary promotion to brigadier general in October 1941. After being held as a prisoner of war for over three years, he retired from active duty as a brigadier general on August 31, 1946.

Lough was buried at Arlington National Cemetery on July 17, 1964.
