= William Weigel =

United States Army general (1863–1936)

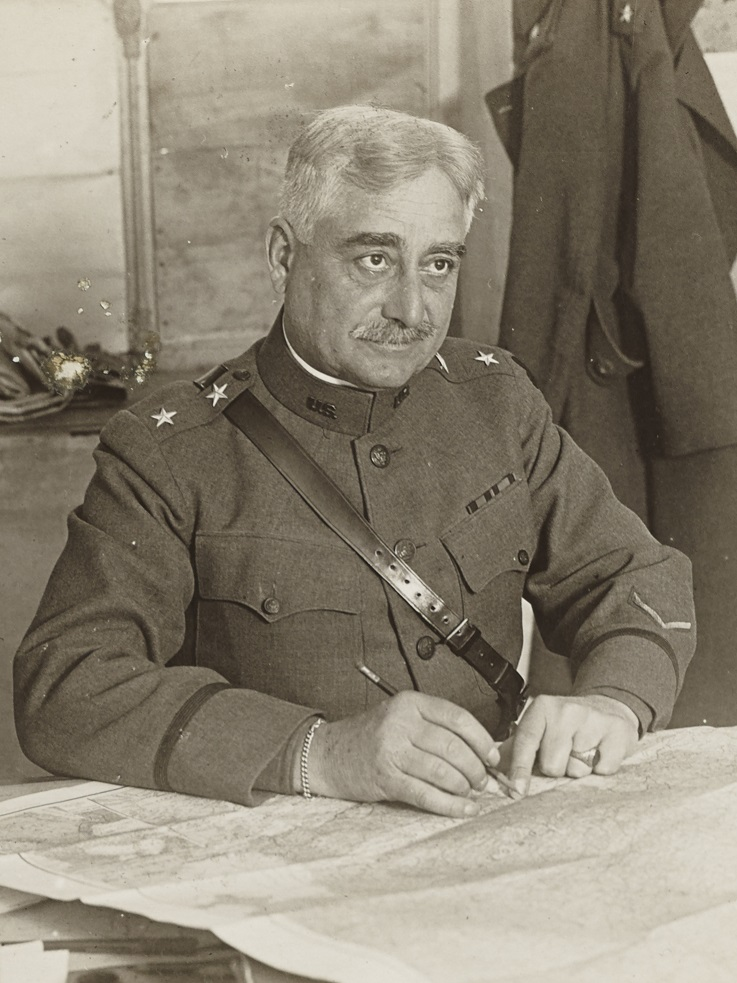
- William Weigel, wearing the two stars of a major general, pictured here in November 1918.
- Born: August 25, 1863; New Brunswick, New Jersey, United States
- Died: March 4, 1936 (aged 72); New York City, United States
- Burial place: Arlington National Cemetery, Virginia, United States
- Military career
- Allegiance: United States
- Branch: United States Army
- Service years: 1887–1927
- Rank: Major General
- Nickname: "Billy"
- Unit: Infantry Branch
- Commands: Second Infantry Regiment; First Infantry Regiment; 151st Depot Brigade; 76th Division; 56th Infantry Brigade; 88th Division; Seventeenth Infantry Regiment; Philippine Division
- Conflicts: Spanish–American War; Philippine–American War; World War I; Champagne-Marne; Aisne-Marne; Oise-Aisne; Meuse-Argonne
- Awards: Army Distinguished Service Medal

Major General William Weigel (August 25, 1863 – March 4, 1936) was a United States Army officer. He served in numerous conflicts and wars, most notably towards the end of World War I, commanding the 56th Brigade of the 28th Division before taking command of the 88th Division in the war's final weeks.

== Early life and military career ==
William Weigel was born August 25, 1863, in New Brunswick, New Jersey, where he grew up and attended school. He graduated from the United States Military Academy (USMA) at West Point, New York, with the class of 1887, ranking 27th in his class of 64. Among his classmates included several men who would later rise to the rank of brigadier general or higher in their military careers. They included: Charles B. Wheeler, Edward C. Young, Richmond P. Davis, Edgar Russel, George O. Squier, Ernest Hinds, George W. Gatchell, Charles H. Martin, P. D. Lochridge, Nathaniel F. McClure, William C. Rivers, Thomas G. Hanson, Herman Hall, Marcus D. Cronin, Alexander L. Dade, Charles S. Farnsworth, Charles Gerhardt, James T. Dean, Ulysses G. McAlexander, Edmund Wittenmyer, Frederic D. Evans, Michael J. Lenihan, Mark L. Hersey and Frank H. Albright.

Upon graduation, Weigel was commissioned a second lieutenant in the Eleventh Infantry and posted at Madison Barracks, Sackets Harbor, New York. In September 1893, he and his regiment were transferred to Whipple Barracks near Prescott, Arizona, where he led a company of Apache Indian scouts. In April 1894, he joined the military staff at West Point as assistant to the quartermaster.

At the outbreak of the Spanish–American War, Weigel became a captain of Volunteers, and joined the New York State Volunteers as quartermaster and mustering officer at Camp Black, on Long Island, New York. He later served as aide-de-camp to Brigadier General Alexander Pennington, and also established what was to become Camp Wikoff at Montauk Point, New York. In December 1898, he was sent to Havana, Cuba as assistant to the Chief Quartermaster for the Division of Cuba. In January 1900, he returned to the Eleventh Infantry at the regular army rank of captain as regimental quartermaster, and went with the regiment to San Juan, Puerto Rico. The regiment returned to the United States in December 1900, and was posted at Washington Barracks.

In April 1901, the Eleventh Infantry was sent to the Philippines, where Weigel became quartermaster for the 1st District of the Department of Visayas, quartermaster for the 6th Separate Brigade campaigning in the field on the island of Samar, and then chief quartermaster for the Surigao Expedition on Mindanao. In August 1903, he was sent to Fort Sheridan, Illinois, serving there as Constructing Quartermaster until September 1907, when he was transferred to the Eighteenth Infantry at Fort Leavenworth, Kansas. He served with this regiment at Camp Keithley, Mindanao from October, 1907 to November, 1909 when the regiment was sent to Fort Mackenzie, Wyoming.

Weigel was promoted to major in March 1910, and assigned to the Second Infantry at Fort Thomas, Kentucky. In September 1910 he was assigned to recruiting duty in Philadelphia. He was then sent to the Twenty-Third Infantry at Fort Benjamin Harrison in April 1912. The regiment was dispatched to Texas City, Texas, in response to events in Mexico (see United States involvement in the Mexican Revolution), and Weigel served there until February 1914. At that time, he was assigned as an inspector and instructor for the National Guard of the State of New York, where he served for eighteen months, before returning to the Twenty-Third Infantry, which by that time was stationed at Fort Crockett on Galveston Island in Texas. In April 1916, Weigel returned to the Second Infantry, now at Fort Shafter, Hawaii, where by June 1916, he had been promoted to lieutenant colonel. He took command of the regiment in March 1917, and was promoted to colonel in May 1917, a month after the American entry into World War I. From July to September 1917 he was in command of the First Infantry at Schofield Barracks, Hawaii.

== World War I ==
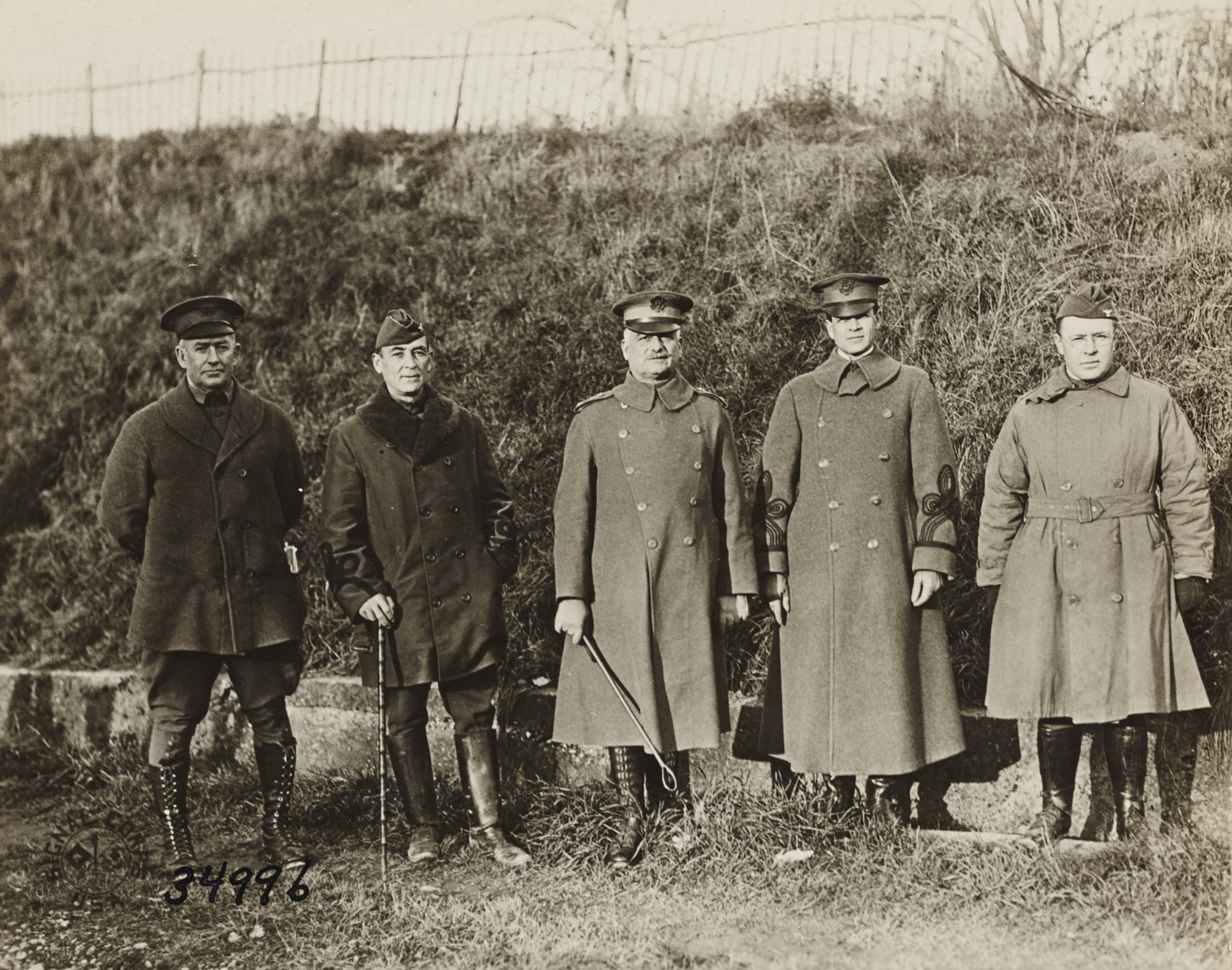
Major General William Weigel, commanding the 88th Division, and members of his staff, here at Lagney, Meurthe-et-Moselle, France, November 15, 1918.

On August 5, 1917, Weigel was appointed a brigadier general in the National Army and given command of the 151st Depot Brigade, a part of the 76th Division stationed at Camp Devens, Massachusetts. He temporarily commanded the 76th Division from December 17, 1917, to March 14, 1918, while the division commander, Major General Harry Foote Hodges, was absent.

He was next given command of the 56th Brigade of the Pennsylvania National Guard's 28th Division, commanded by Major General Charles Henry Muir, which arrived on the Western Front in mid-May 1918 and began weeks of training with British and French forces before going into the line at Château-Thierry and participating in the Champagne-Marne, Aisne-Marne, and Oise-Aisne campaigns. In recognition of his service during this period, Weigel was awarded the Army Distinguished Service Medal and the Croix de guerre with palm. The citation for his Army DSM reads:

The President of the United States of America, authorized by Act of Congress, July 9, 1918, takes pleasure in presenting the Army Distinguished Service Medal to Major General William Weigel, United States Army, for exceptionally meritorious and distinguished services to the Government of the United States, in a duty of great responsibility during World War I. As Commander of a Brigade of the 28th Division in the fighting on the Vesle of August 1918, General Weigel inspired confidence by his constant activities and his aggressive pressing of the enemy at every opportunity, which resulted in driving the hostile forces across the Vesle northward toward the Aisne.

Weigel was promoted to major general on August 8, 1918, and took command of the Eighty-Eighth Division on September 10. The division relieved a French division in a relatively quiet sector of Haute-Alsace before taking part in the Meuse-Argonne Campaign from November 6–11.

With the war now over due to the Armistice with Germany, the division remained in France through May 1919 before returning to the United States, where it was demobilized in June.

== Post-war career ==
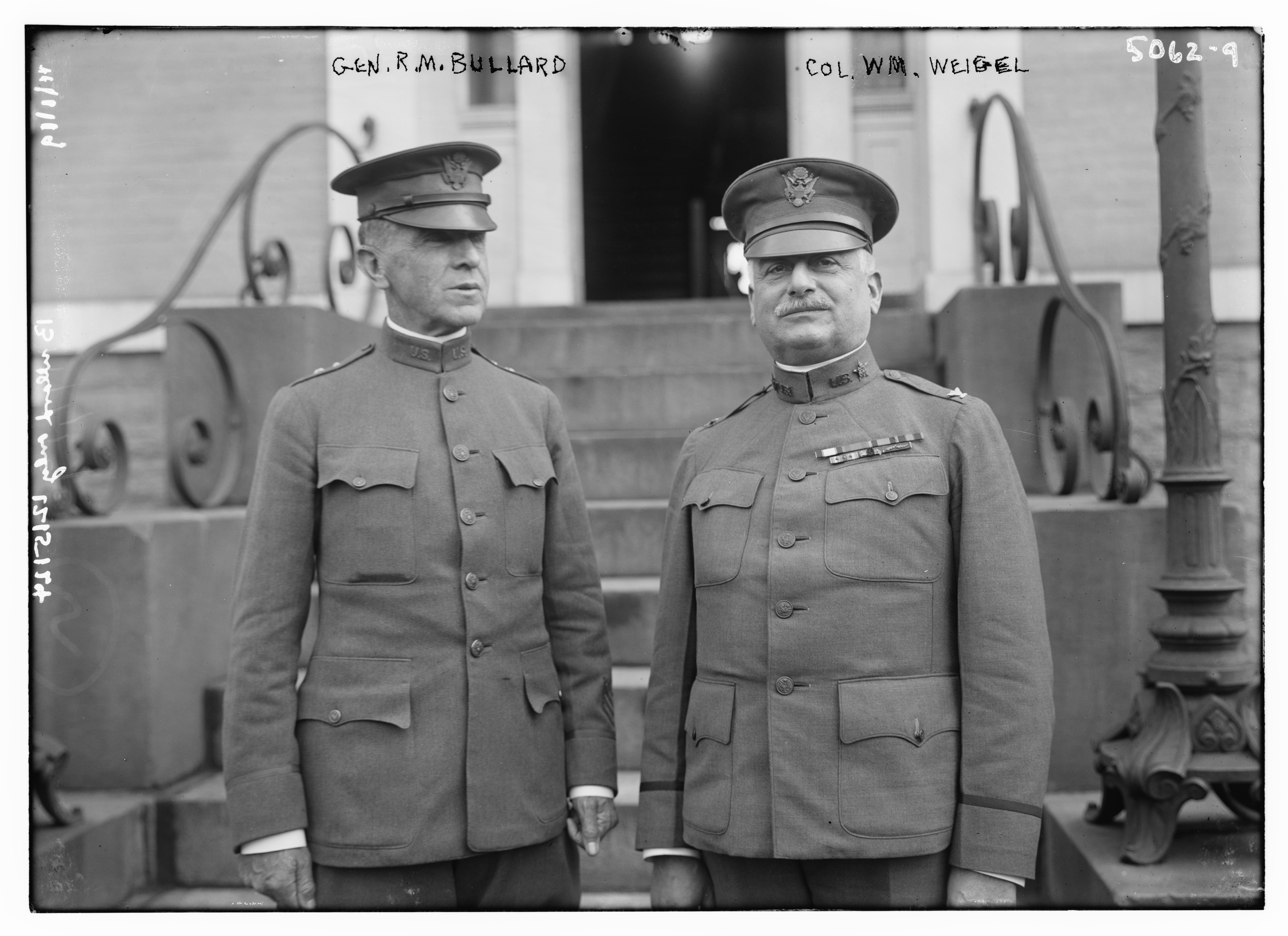
Colonel William Weigel and Major General Robert Lee Bullard, commander of the Second Corps Area.

Weigel returned to his Regular Army rank of colonel on June 15, 1919, commanding the 17th Infantry Regiment at Camp Meade, Maryland, to August 22 when he began serving as chief of staff for the Second Corps Area at Governor's Island. On March 5, 1921, he was promoted to brigadier general and given command of the 2nd Brigade of the 1st Division at Camp Dix, which he held until February 1922 when he became the deputy commander of XII Corps, based in New York City. He was promoted to major general on November 20, 1924, and sent to Fort William McKinley in the Philippines to command the Philippine Division. In March 1927 he returned to the United States and served as head of public relations for the army in the headquarters of the Second Corps Area until his retirement on August 25, 1927.

== Later life and legacy ==
Weigel died at the age of 72 at Governors Island, New York, on March 4, 1936, and is buried in Arlington National Cemetery.

The USS General William Weigel is named for him.

== Awards ==
- Indian Campaign Medal
- Spanish War Service Medal
- Army of Cuban Occupation Medal
- Spanish Campaign Medal
- Victory Medal with four campaign clasps
- Legion of Honor (France)
- Croix de Guerre (France)

Military offices
| Preceded by Edward H. Plummer (last permanent commander) | Commanding General 88th Division; 1918–1919 | Succeeded by Post deactivated |
| Preceded by Douglas MacArthur | Commanding General Philippine Division; 1925–1927 | Succeeded by Frank M. Caldwell |
