= Frank Sherwood Cocheu =

United States Army general

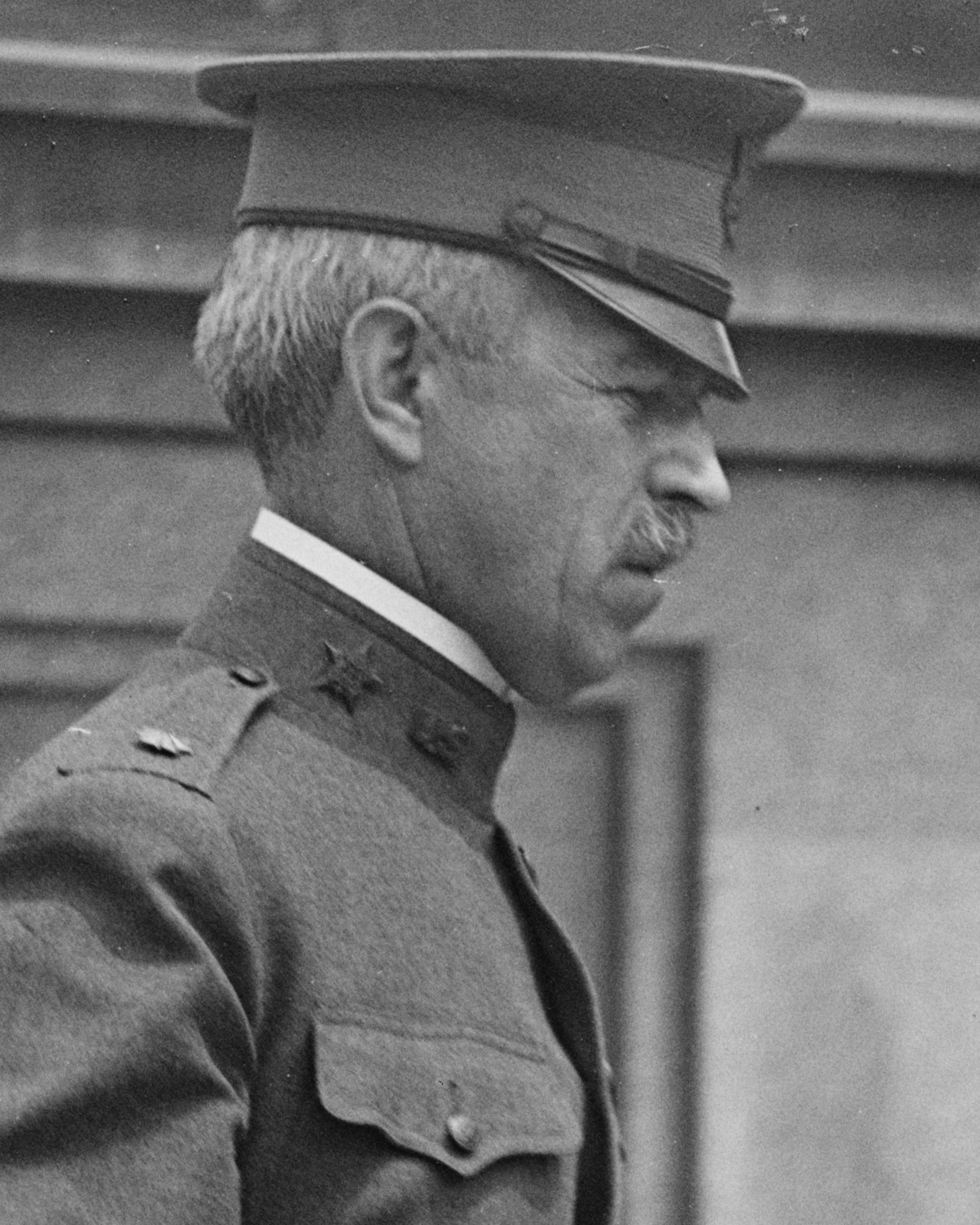
- Cocheu as a major in 1917
- Born: November 22, 1871; Brooklyn, New York
- Died: May 28, 1959 (aged 87); Washington, D.C.
- Burial place: Arlington National Cemetery
- Spouse: Kathleen Lacey
- Military career
- Allegiance: United States
- Branch: United States Army
- Service years: 1894–1935
- Rank: Major General
- Service number: 0-449
- Unit: Infantry Branch
- Commands: Philippine Division; 4th Brigade, 2nd Division; 3rd Brigade, 2nd Division; Fourth Coast Artillery District; 58th Brigade, 29th Division; 319th Infantry, 80th Division; 3rd Battalion, 12th Infantry; 2nd Battalion, 12th Infantry
- Conflicts: Spanish–American War; Philippine–American War; World War I
- Awards: Army Distinguished Service Medal

Frank Sherwood Cocheu (November 22, 1871 – May 28, 1959) was a retired American major general who served in France during World War I. He is noted for his command of the 319th Infantry, 80th Division during the Meuse-Argonne offensive in late 1918.

== Early life and education ==
Frank Sherwood Cocheu was born on November 22, 1871, in Brooklyn, New York.

He attended the United States Military Academy, where he graduated with the class of 1894.

== Military career ==
He was commissioned into the infantry in June 1894 as a second lieutenant.

Cocheu fought at El Caney and San Juan Hill in Cuba with the 12th Infantry during the Spanish–American War. He then served with the regiment in the Philippines from 1899 to 1902 and again from 1904 to 1906. During his second tour, Cocheu commanded a company and the 3rd Battalion. He later commanded the 2nd Battalion for nine months after the regiment returned to the United States.

Cocheu attended the Army War College, graduating in November 1908. He then served as instructor and assistant director at the Army War College from 1908 to 1911.

Cocheu was promoted to major on June 18, 1916. During World War I, he accepted temporary promotions to colonel on August 16, 1917, and to brigadier general on October 13, 1918, serving until July 15, 1919. Cocheu commanded the 319th Infantry, 80th Division in combat and the 58th Brigade, 29th Division after the Armistice with Germany which ended World War I. His permanent rank was increased to lieutenant colonel on August 28, 1917, and to colonel on July 1, 1920.

Cocheu graduated from the General Staff School at Fort Leavenworth in July 1920. He then returned to the Army War College, graduating from a second course in June 1921.

Cocheu served as assistant commandant of the Army Infantry School from June 1925 to November 1927. He accepted a permanent promotion to brigadier general on October 18, 1927. Cocheu commanded the Fourth Coast Artillery District from January to November 1928. He was then assigned as a brigade commander in the 2nd Division. During the Mexican revolution of 1929, Cocheu served as commanding general of American troops in Arizona.

Cocheu commanded the Philippine Division from June 1933 to May 1935. He accepted a promotion to major general on March 26, 1934. Cocheu retired from active duty on November 30, 1935, having reached the mandatory retirement age of 64.

== Awards ==
Cocheu received the Army Distinguished Service Medal for his services in commanding the 319th Infantry, 80th Division, from August 1917 to October 1918 in the Artois sector and during the Meuse–Argonne offensive. The citation for the medal reads:

The President of the United States of America, authorized by Act of Congress, July 9, 1918, takes pleasure in presenting the Army Distinguished Service Medal to Colonel (Infantry) Frank Sherwood Cocheu, United States Army, for exceptionally meritorious and distinguished services to the Government of the United States, in a duty of great responsibility during World War I. In Command of the 319th Infantry, 80th Division, from August 1917 to October 1918, Colonel Cocheu displayed marked ability in its organization, training, and service in the field. In operations against the enemy in the Artois sector and Meuse-Argonne offensive he rendered conspicuous service by leading his command with exceptional judgment, unflagging energy, and tactical ability, at all times proving himself to be a skillful commander thus enabling his regiment to always carry its tasks through to a successful end. His services were highly meritorious and rendered in a position of great responsibility.

== Death and legacy ==
Cocheu lived in Washington, D.C., after retirement and died at Walter Reed Hospital on May 28, 1959. He was buried in Arlington National Cemetery.

== Personal life ==
Cocheu married Kathleen Lacey on August 4, 1897. She died in 1940.
