= Philippine Division (United States) =

Infantry division of the US Army during WWII

Philippine Division 12th Infantry Division
- Shoulder sleeve insignia
- Active: 29 April 1921–9 April 1942; 6 April 1946–30 April 1947 (as 12th Infantry Division Philippine Scouts)
- Country: United States
- Branch: United States Army
- Type: Square Division
- Part of: USAFFE; Philippine Department
- Headquarters: Fort William McKinley
- Engagements: World War II; Philippine Islands

Commanders
- Notable commanders: MG Jonathan M. Wainwright; MG William Weigel

Insignia
- Distinctive unit insignia: None authorized

The Philippine Division, or from 1944–1947 the 12th Infantry Division, was the core U.S. infantry division of the United States Army's Philippine Department before and during World War II.

The division was organized in April 1922 and primarily consisted of United States Army officers and Filipino enlisted men. It primary purpose was to defend the Philippines from invasion. When the Philippine Army was established in 1935, it provided a potential candidate pool of Filipinos with military experience.

On 31 July 1941, the division consisted of 10,473 troops, mostly enlisted Filipinos, known as the Philippine Scouts who formed the 45th and 57th US Infantry Regiments. All of the division's enlisted men, with the exception of the 31st Infantry Regiment, and various military police and headquarters troops, were Philippine Scouts.

In October 1941, as part of the U.S. Army Forces Far East, plans were made to "triangularize" the division. The 34th Infantry was detached from the 8th Infantry Division and moved to a port of embarkation in December 1941, along with two battalions of 105mm field artillery. The Philippine Division was to have two complete U.S. regimental combat teams in place by January 1942 to provide General Douglas MacArthur with a modern, trained mobile reaction force, while freeing up Philippine Scouts for rounding out other units. The outbreak of war in December 1941, however, isolated the Philippines and prevented implementation of the plan.

== History ==
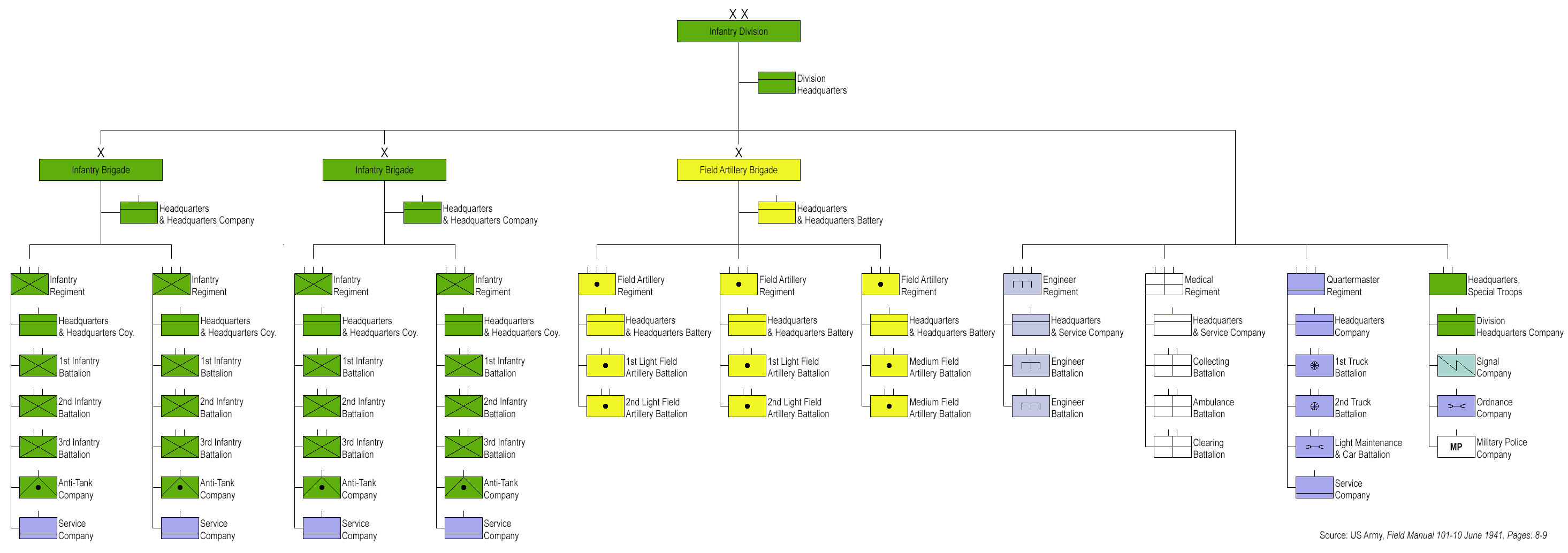
Square Division example: 1940 US Infantry Division. On the far left can be seen two Brigades of two Regiments each

=== World War II ===
The Philippine Division was constituted in the Regular Army on 7 December 1921 and activated at Fort William McKinley, Philippine Islands, on 10 April 1922. The division was the primary ground force of the Philippine Department and was given the mission of defending the Philippine archipelago from potential invaders. The division began organizing around the nucleus of the 23rd Infantry Brigade (consisting of the 45th and 57th Infantry Regiments), which was activated on 15 December 1921. Additionally, the 31st Infantry, the 1st Battalion, 24th Field Artillery, the 1st Battalion, 14th Engineers, and several of the companies in the division special troops were already organized and integrated into the division. The division continued to receive and activate units throughout 1922, adding HHC, 24th Infantry Brigade; HHC, 12th Field Artillery Brigade, Headquarters, Philippine Division Quartermaster Train, and several of the train’s elements, and the 12th Motorcycle Company by April. The 15th Infantry Regiment was assigned to the division in July 1922, however, only the 1st Battalion was stationed in the Philippines. The remainder of the regiment was posted to the American Barracks in Tientsin, China, and attached to Headquarters, American Forces in China. By the end of 1922, the 12th Medical Regiment was activated and rounded out the division’s structure. The Philippine Division was forced to inactivate several units over the interwar years due to budget decreases, starting with the 12th Field Artillery Brigade headquarters in 1922, followed by the 1st Battalion, 15th Infantry in 1929, and the 24th Infantry Brigade headquarters in 1930. With the relief of the 31st Infantry from the division in 1931, the 24th Infantry Brigade was redesignated as a Philippine Scout (PS) organization and the 43rd and 44th Infantry Regiments (PS) were added to the brigade as inactive units. Additionally, the inactive 25th Field Artillery (PS) was relieved and the 23rd Field Artillery (PS) replaced it as the division’s other indirect fire regiment, also in an inactive status.

Like other overseas divisions at the time, the Philippine Division was fortunate in that it was located on the terrain on which it would fight if the archipelago was ever invaded. Therefore, the training in which it participated tended to be more realistic and provided a more focused military environment. The environment helped to develop many of the Army officers who would lead the United States to victory in World War II. Due to the archipelago’s seasonal weather patterns, the division conducted individual training, marksmanship training, and schools for specialists during the rainy months of June–August. The drier months of September–November were devoted to officer and noncommissioned officer schools, garrison work details, inspections, and maneuver preparation. The late part of the year began with small unit training, reconnaissance of the maneuver areas for the next major department exercise, and exercising transportation and communications systems. These activities were followed by the repair and construction of roads leading to and on the peninsula of Bataan. The preparations finally culminated in the large-scale division and department maneuvers in January and February. The maneuvers occasionally included large surface squadrons from the Navy as well as amphibious invasion forces provided by the US Marine Corps.

In 1933, the Philippine Division began to train in earnest to prepare for an invasion, which Army planners believed would come at the beaches of Lingayen. The January 1934 maneuver was actually little more than a thorough reconnaissance of the Bataan peninsula with particular emphasis on the Miraveles Mountains. This reconnaissance revealed the poor internal road net of the peninsula, and the 14th Engineers and 23rd Field Artillery were put to work improving the trails and roads. The 1935 maneuver was again held on Bataan. This exercise focused on determining the enemy avenues of approach and selecting defensive positions to block those approaches. The 1936 maneuver came uncannily close to rehearsing what would occur 6 years later when the Japanese invaded. The 26th Cavalry, with the 23rd Field Artillery in support, was sent to scout the Lingayan landing areas and report movements of the invasion force, while the Philippine Division concentrated near Fort Stotsenburg. As the enemy forced the cavalry back, the Philippine Division fought a delaying action, fell back onto Bataan to defend the Olongopo Road, and then centered its defense on the Miraveles Mountains where the exercise ended.

The next change to the division’s structure came in 1936 with the reorganization of the Quartermaster Train into the 12th Quartermaster Regiment. Shortly before Pearl Harbor, the 31st Infantry was reassigned to the Philippine Division, and the 1st Battalions of the 43rd Infantry and the 23rd Field Artillery were activated. Interestingly, the 24th Infantry Brigade was still assigned as an inactive unit; therefore, the Philippine Division was the only Regular Army infantry division that retained the “square” structure (at least on paper) on entry into World War II. The location of the division headquarters on 7 December 1941 was Fort William McKinley.

==== Organization (July 1941) ====
Unit	Officers	American enlisted	Philippine Scouts (PS) enlisted	Total
HHC, Philippine Division	30 (incl. 2 PS officers)	4	147	181
HQ, Special Troops	5 (incl. 2 PS officers)		5	5
12th Military Police Company (PS)	5	45	86	136
12th Ordnance Company (PS)	3		139	142
12th Signal Company (PS)	10		217	227
31st Infantry Regiment (assigned December 1941)	114	1,986		2,100
23rd Infantry Brigade (PS)				
45th Infantry Regiment (PS)	117 (incl. 3 PS officers)		2,148	2,265
57th Infantry Regiment (PS)	118 (incl. 1 PS officer)		2,161	2,279
24th Infantry Brigade (PS)	Brigade headquarters inactive			
1st Battalion, 43rd Infantry Regiment (PS)	16		313	329
23d Field Artillery Regiment (PS) (QF 2.95-inch mountain gun)	10		391	401
24th Field Artillery Regiment (PS) (M1917 75mm gun)	39 (incl. 5 PS officers)		804	843
14th Engineer Regiment (PS)	24 (incl. 1 PS officer)		846	870
12th Medical Regiment (PS)	22		399	421
12th Quartermaster Regiment (PS)	18 (incl. 1 PS officer)		574	592
4th Veterinary Company (PS)	1		10	11

==== Combat chronicle ====
Units of the Philippine Division were on security missions at Manila, Fort William McKinley, and Bataan prior to the declaration of war in the Pacific, 8 December 1941. After undergoing 2 days of bombings, the Division moved into the field to cover the withdrawal of troops to Bataan and to resist the enemy in the Subic Bay area. From 11 December 1941 to 23 December 1941, positions were organized and strengthened and on 23 December 1941 the Division was assigned to the Bataan Defense Forces. While the 31st Infantry Regiment moved to the vicinity of Zig Zag Pass to cover the flanks of troops withdrawing from central and southern Luzon, 30 December 1941, the rest of the Division organized the main and reserve positions on Bataan. The 31st Infantry Regiment moved to a defensive position on the west side of the Olongapo Road near Layac Junction, 5 January 1942. This junction was lost on 6 January 1942, but the withdrawal to Bataan had been successfully concluded.

The Division was placed in reserve from 7 January 1942 to 14 January 1942. This period was largely one of reconnaissance and development by the Japanese in preparation for their attack on the main battle position on the Abucay line. Elements repulsed night attacks near Abucay on 10 January 1942 – 12 January 1942, and other elements of the Division counterattacked on 16 January 1942. Strong offensive and defensive action was not able to prevent enemy penetrations and the Division withdrew to the Reserve Battle Position in the Pilar – Bagac area, 2 February 1942. Until the latter part of March the enemy, made cautious by heavy losses, engaged in patrols and limited local attacks, and after a general retirement, 24 March 1942, did not undertake any serious activity on this front until 28 March 1942. During this period elements of the Division were shifted to assist in the defense of other sectors. The enemy attack on 28 March struck at a division weakened by malnutrition, sickness, and prolonged exposure to combat. The Division, no longer operating as a coordinated unit, was unable to counterattack against heavy enemy assaults.

On 8 April 1942, the 57th Infantry Regiment and the 31st Infantry Regiment were lost near the Alangan River, and the 45th Infantry Regiment surrendered, 10 April 1942.

==== Wartime assignments ====
1. U.S. Army Forces in the Far East (USAFFE) – 8 December 1941 – 24 December 1941.
2. Bataan Defense Force – 24 December 1941 – 6 January 1942.
3. U.S. Army Forces in the Far East (USAFFE) – 6 January 1942 – 26 January 1942.
4. II Philippine Corps – 26 January 1942 – 7 April 1942.
5. I Philippine Corps – 7 April 1942 – 10 April 1942.
6. Prisoner of War Captivity – 10 April 1942 – 1945

=== Postwar ===
The division was redesignated on 6 April 1946 as the 12th Infantry Division, inactivated 30 April 1947, and disbanded on 23 March 1953.

== Commanders ==
- MG Omar Bundy (April 1922 – March 1924)
- MG Douglas MacArthur (March 1924 – January 1925)
- MG William Weigel (January 1925 – February 1927)
- MG Frank M. Caldwell (February 1927 – April 1927)
- MG Johnson Hagood (April 1927 – June 1929)
- MG Paul B. Malone (June 1929 – June 1931)
- BG Casper H. Conrad Jr. (June 1931 – July 1933)
- BG Frank S. Cocheu (July 1933 – May 1935)
- BG Stanley H. Ford (May 1935 – May 1935)
- BG Alfred T. Smith (June 1935 – January 1937)
- BG Evan H. Humphrey (January 1937 – January 1937)
- BG John L. DeWitt (January 1937 – April 1937)
- BG George Grunert (April 1937 – July 1937)
- MG John H. Hughes (July 1937 – February 1938)
- MG Percy P. Bishop (February 1938 – October 1938)
- MG Walter S. Grant (October 1938 – July 1939)
- BG H. Conger Pratt (July 1939 – November 1939)
- MG George Grunert (November 1939 – May 1940)
- MG H. Conger Pratt (May 1940 – November 1940)
- MG Jonathan M. Wainwright IV (November 1940 – December 1941)
- BG Maxon S. Lough (December 1941 – May 1942)

== Miscellaneous ==
The regimental colors of the 12th Quartermaster Regiment (PS) were given to an Army nurse (one of the "Angels of Bataan and Corregidor") by the regimental commander. Upon her capture she told the Japanese that it was "only a shawl" and kept it safe throughout more than three years of captivity. Today, the colors are on display at the U.S. Army Quartermaster Museum, Fort Gregg-Adams, Virginia.

== Heraldry, honors, and decorations ==
=== Shoulder sleeve insignia ===
- Description: On a scarlet spade-shaped shield, a yellow carabao's head caboshed.
- Symbolism: The carabao is suggestive of the Philippines, and the colors red and gold represent the Spanish heritage of the islands.

=== Campaign participation credit ===
Conflict	Streamer	Year(s)
World War II	Philippine Islands	7 Dec 41 – 10 May 42
World War II	World War II Victory	service between 7 December 1941 and 31 December 1946

=== Unit awards ===
Ribbon	Award	Embroidered
	Presidential Unit Citation	LUZON 1941–1942
	Presidential Unit Citation	BATAAN
	Presidential Unit Citation	DEFENSE OF THE PHILIPPINES
	Philippine Presidential Unit Citation	7 DECEMBER 1941 TO 10 MAY 1942

=== Personal awards ===
- Medals of Honor: 3.

== Bibliography ==
- Drake, Charles C. (28 June 1926). Philippine maneuvers. Infantry #625. p. 31.
- Morton, Louis (1953). The Fall of the Philippines: United States in World War II Series. Washington, D.C.: United States Army Center of Military History.

== See also ==
- Charles C. Drake
- Battle of the Philippines (1941–42)
- Divisions of the United States Army
- Military History of the Philippines
- Military History of the United States
