= Omar Bundy =

United States Army officer (1861–1940)

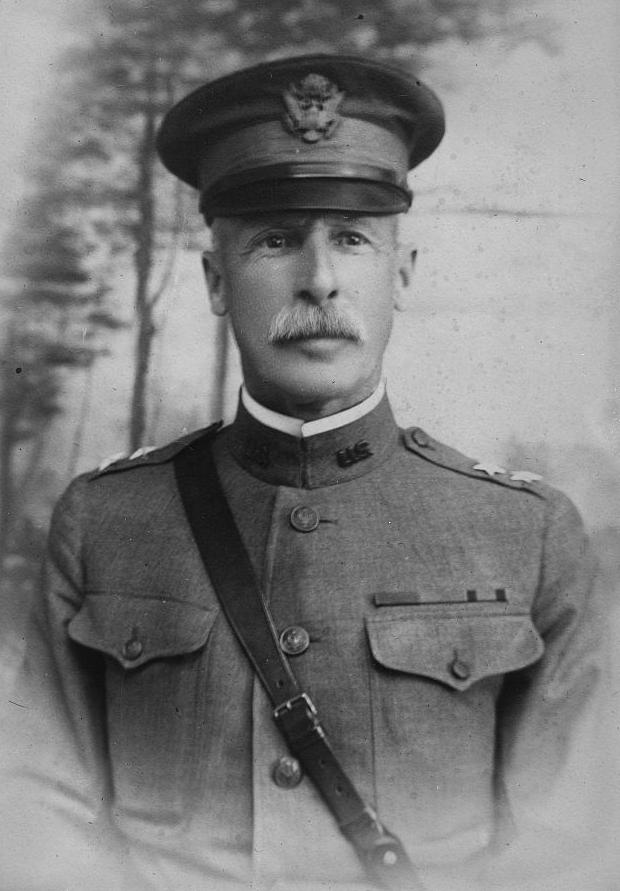
- Born: June 17, 1861; New Castle, Indiana, United States
- Died: January 20, 1940 (aged 78); Washington, D.C., United States
- Burial place: Arlington National Cemetery, Virginia, United States
- Spouse: Adda Love "Addie" Harden (m. 1889-1940, his death)
- Military career
- Allegiance: United States
- Branch: United States Army
- Service years: 1883–1925
- Rank: Major General
- Service number: 0-31
- Unit: Infantry Branch
- Commands: 16th Regiment; 1st Brigade; 2nd Division; VI Corps; VII Corps; Fort Lee, Virginia; Philippine Division; Seventh Corps Area; Fifth Corps Area
- Conflicts: American Indian Wars; Spanish–American War; Philippine–American War; Pancho Villa Expedition; World War I
- Awards: Army Distinguished Service Medal; Silver Star (2); Legion of Honor (France); Croix de Guerre (France); 2nd Division Medal

Major General Omar Bundy (June 17, 1861 – January 20, 1940) was a career United States Army officer who was a veteran of the American Indian Wars, Spanish–American War, Philippine–American War, Pancho Villa Expedition, and World War I.

A native of New Castle, Indiana, Bundy graduated from the West Point in 1883 and began his career as a second lieutenant of Infantry. After service on the U.S. western frontier and in the American Indian Wars, Bundy took part in Spanish–American War combat in Cuba as a participant in the Battle of El Caney, for which he received the Silver Star. His continued career included several tours in the Philippines, among them combat during the Philippine–American War, for which he received a second Silver Star. As commander of the 16th Infantry Regiment and adjutant of the Army's Southern Department, Bundy was a participant in the Pancho Villa Expedition.

During World War I, Bundy commanded the 2nd Division during combat in France in the summer of 1918. Afterwards he was promoted to command of first U.S. VI Corps, and then U.S. VII Corps. For his wartime service, Bundy received the French Legion of Honor (Commander) and the French Croix de Guerre with Palm. After the war, Bundy commanded Fort Lee, Virginia, the Philippine Division, the Seventh Corps Area, and the Fifth Corps Area.

Bundy retired in 1925, and was a resident of Washington, D.C. In 1938 he suffered a stroke that left him in ill health and with partial paralysis. He died in Washington on January 20, 1940, and was buried at Arlington National Cemetery.

== Early life and education ==
Omar Bundy was born in New Castle, Indiana, on June 17, 1861, a son of Judge Martin Bundy and Amanda (Elliott) Bundy. He came from a military family; Bundy's father was a Union Army paymaster during the American Civil War and his great-grandfather, Christopher Bundy, served in the Patriot military of North Carolina during the American Revolution.

A graduate of New Castle's grammar and high school, Bundy attended Asbury College (now DePauw University) from 1878 to 1879, where one of his classmates was Willis Van Devanter. While at Asbury, Bundy became a member of the Beta Theta Pi fraternity. In 1879, Bundy was appointed to the United States Military Academy (USMA) at West Point, New York, by U.S. Representative Milton S. Robinson. He graduated from West Point in 1883, ranked 50th of 52. (Note: The graduates ranked lower than Bundy were Lawrence Tyson and Clarence Ransom Edwards.) Several of his classmates would go on to become general officers in their careers, such as Charles W. Kennedy, George H. Cameron, Harry C. Hale, George W. Read, John W. Heard, Ira A. Haynes, Samson L. Faison, William C. Langfitt, Robert D. Walsh, Lawrence Tyson, Charles G. Morton, Tyree R. Rivers, John W. Ruckman, Isaac Littell and Clarence R. Edwards.

== Start of military career ==
After graduation, Bundy was commissioned as a second lieutenant of Infantry and assigned to the 2nd Infantry Regiment at Fort Lapwai, Idaho. He served with the 2nd Infantry until June 1884, when he was transferred to the 3rd Infantry at Fort Missoula, Montana.

From 1885 to 1887, Bundy was a student at Fort Leavenworth's Infantry and Cavalry School. He then returned to the 3rd Infantry at Fort Missoula, where his duties included participation in an 1888 American Indian Wars expedition against the Crow near Fort Custer, Montana. In late May 1888, the 3rd Infantry was assigned to duty at Fort Meade, South Dakota.

In May 1890, Bundy was promoted to first lieutenant. During the winter of 1890-1891 he took part in an Indian Wars expedition against the Sioux. From 1891 to 1898, Bundy was on duty with the 3rd Infantry at Fort Snelling, Minnesota. For much of this period, he served as both the post and regimental quartermaster. He received his promotion to captain in April 1898.

== Spanish–American War ==
At the start of the Spanish–American War in early 1898, Bundy was offered a position as commissary officer with the United States Volunteers, which he declined. In May, he traveled with the 3rd Infantry to the Mobile, Alabama, port of embarkation. The regiment sailed for Cuba in June, where it was part of the Fifth Army Corps. Bundy took part in the July 1898 Battle of El Caney, and received the Silver Star in recognition of his heroism. Following this fight, Bundy took part in the July 1898 Siege of Santiago, after which he returned to the United States.

== Continued career ==
Following his service in Cuba, Bundy performed recruiting duty in Milwaukee, Wisconsin, for eight months. In March 1899, he was assigned to the 6th Infantry Regiment at Fort Sam Houston, Texas, with duty as regimental quartermaster. In May 1899, the 6th Infantry sailed to the Philippines for service during the Philippine–American War. Bundy took part in action against the Ladrones (Pirates of the South China Coast) and anti-U.S. government insurgents on Negros Island. He subsequently served as inspector general for the Department of the Visayas, assistant to the inspector general and provost marshal of Iloilo province, and then with the 6th Infantry in Iloilo.

In 1902, Bundy returned to the United States and was assigned to the faculty of Department of Law at Fort Leavenworth's United States Army Command and General Staff College. In July 1904 he was promoted to major. In 1905, he returned to the Philippines with the 6th Infantry to participate in the U.S. response to the Moro Rebellion. During this assignment, Bundy took part in the March 1906 First Battle of Bud Dajo. For his service in the Philippines, Bundy received a second award of the Silver Star.

After Bundy's return to the United States in early 1907, he was assigned to duty at Fort William Henry Harrison, Montana. Later that year he was assigned as inspector general of the Army's Northern Division, stationed in Chicago, Illinois. In July 1907, he was appointed inspector general of the Department of Texas, with headquarters at Fort Sam Houston. From 1909 to 1911, he served in Omaha, Nebraska, first as assistant to the inspector general of the Department of Missouri and then as the department's inspector general. Bundy was promoted to lieutenant colonel in March 1911.

From 1911 to 1912, Bundy was assigned to the 11th Infantry Regiment, first at Fort Sam Houston, then at Fort D. A. Russell, Wyoming. In September 1912, he began attendance at the United States Army War College, from which he graduated in July 1913. He then rejoined the 11th Infantry, which had been posted to Texas City, Texas. In July 1914, Bundy was promoted to colonel and in August he assumed command of the 16th Infantry Regiment in El Paso, Texas. From October 1915 to May 1917, Bundy was assigned as adjutant of the Southern Department, serving in the Pancho Villa Expedition under commanders Frederick Funston (1914–1916) and John J. Pershing (1916–1917).

== World War I ==
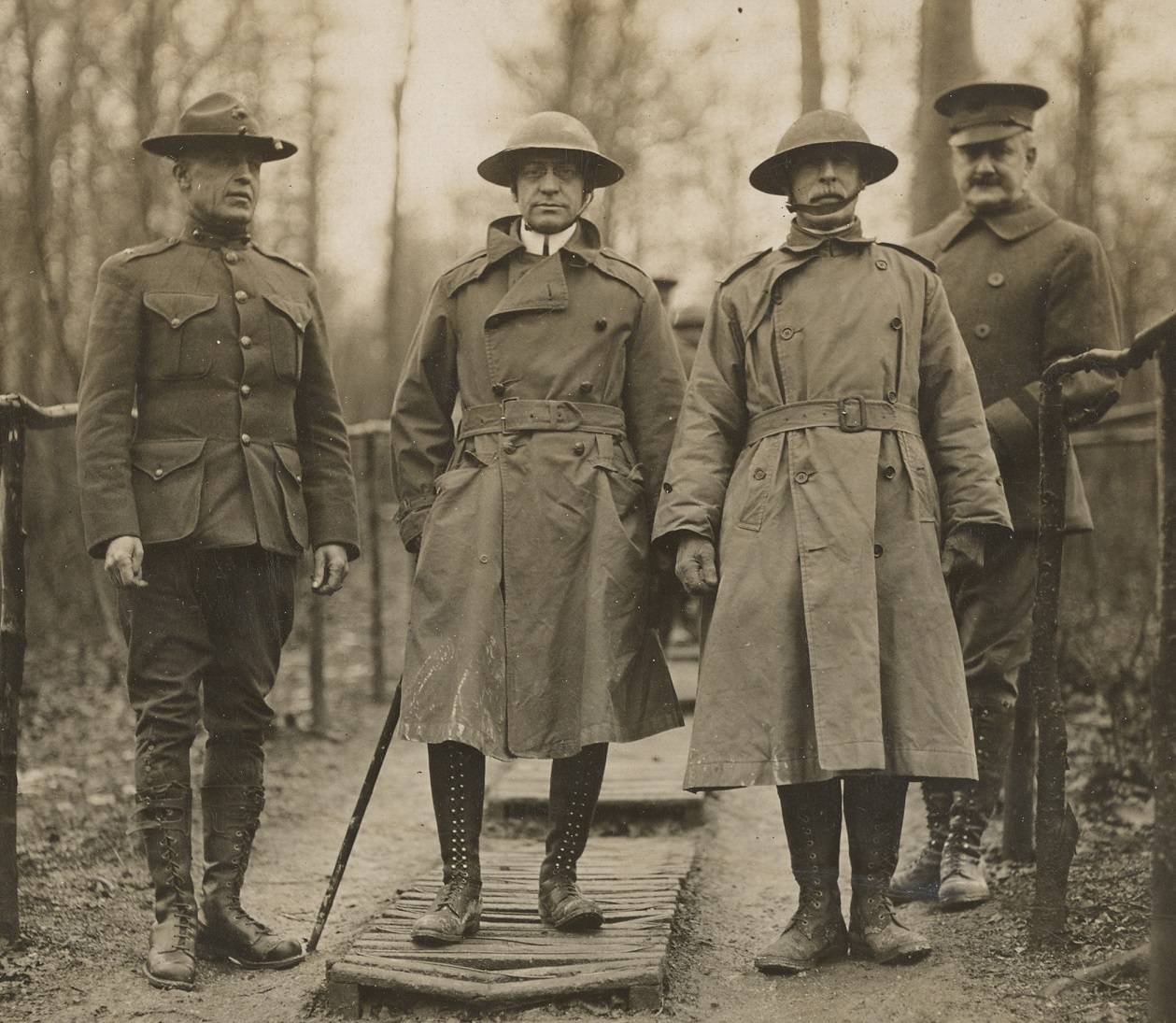
Major General Omar Bundy (second from the right) with Brigadier General James Harbord (right) and Secretary of War Newton D. Baker (second from the left) March 20, 1918, during a tour of inspection of the AEF's lines of communication.

In May 1917, a month after the American entry into World War I, Bundy was promoted to brigadier general during the army's expansion for the war, and in June he assumed command of the newly created 1st Infantry Brigade, which comprised the 16th and 18th infantry regiments, along with the 3rd Machine Gun Battalion. The brigade, together with Brigadier General Robert Lee Bullard's 2nd Infantry Brigade and supporting units, was part of the 1st Expeditionary Division (later redesignated the 1st Division), which had also just been created, commanded by Major General William L. Sibert.

The division soon sailed for France to form the first part of the American Expeditionary Forces (AEF), commanded by Major General John J. Pershing, who was well known to Bundy.

In August, Bundy, having been a brigadier general for just three months, was promoted again, this time to the temoorary rank of major general and assigned to duty locating and preparing billeting and training areas in anticipation of the arrival of larger numbers of American forces.

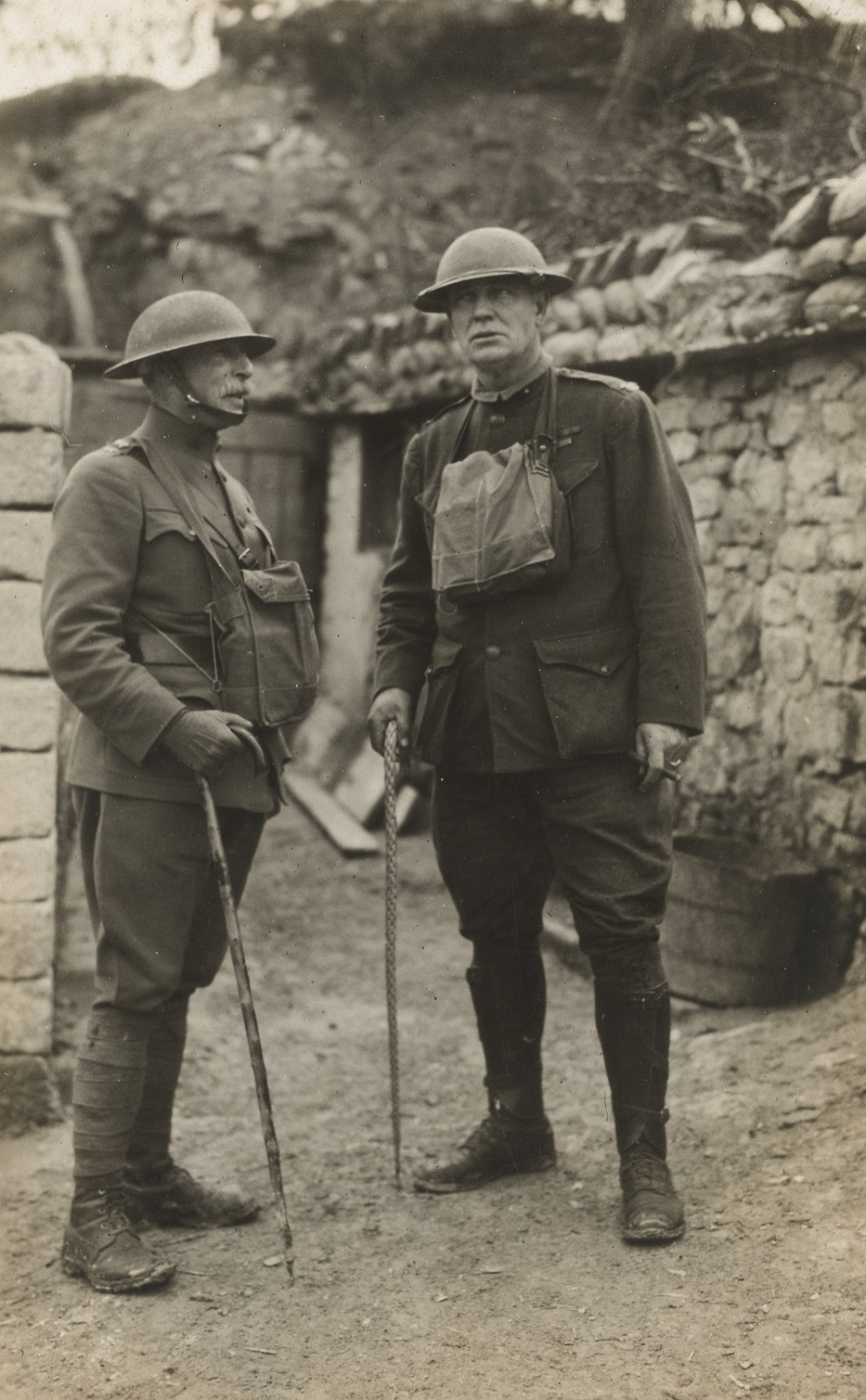
Major General Omar Bundy (left), commanding the 2nd Division, and Colonel Albertus W. Catlin, a recipient of the Medal of Honor, commanding the 6th Marine Regiment, 2nd Division, at the front near Sommedieue, France, April 30, 1918.

It was not long before Bundy received a new appointment, however, as in November he assumed command of the 2nd Division, which had only recently been assembled. Somewhat unusually, the division, like the 1st a Regular Army formation, contained a brigade of U.S. Marines, the 4th, instead of the standard organization of two brigades of army infantry, with the other infantry brigade in the division being the Army's 3rd. The next few months for Bundy and his men were devoted to training.

In early March 1918, the 2nd Division was assigned to duty on a quiet sector of the Allied defensive line in the Department of the Meuse between Saint-Mihiel and Verdun, in order to complete the second stage of its training, "which was to begin March 13, 1918". On March 21, the German Army commenced their massive Spring Offensive, which required Bundy's 2nd Division to perform occupation duty in Toulon-sur-Arroux, Rupt, and Troyon.

Ongoing combat resulted in the division's participation in the June 1918 Battles of Battle of Belleau Wood and Chateau-Thierry. As the Germans advanced before the Belleau Wood fight, the French commander under whom Bundy was serving ordered the 2nd Division to retreat with their French counterparts. Bundy refused and instead launched a successful counterattack.

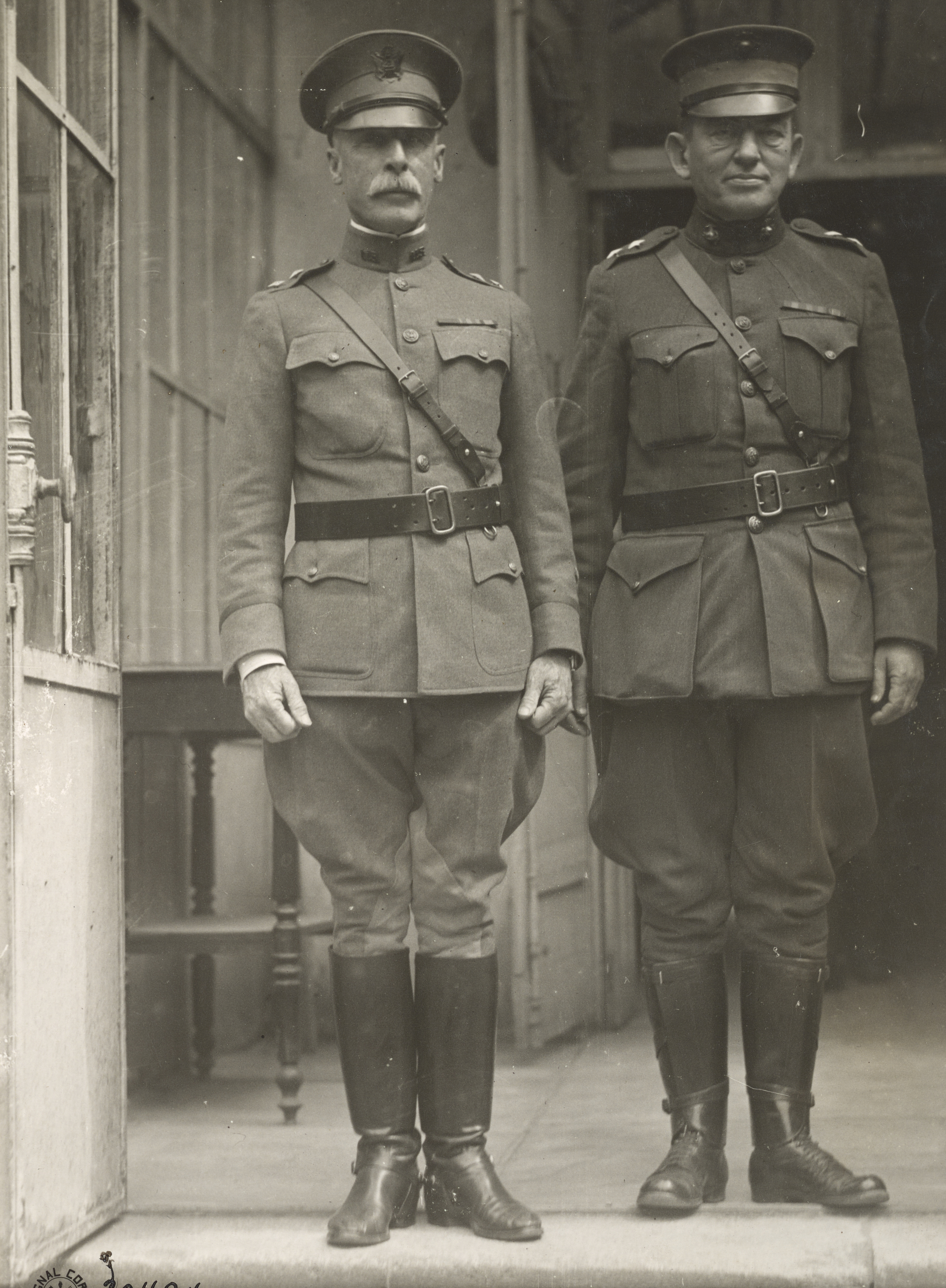
Major General Omar Bundy, former commander of the 2nd Division, and Major General John A. Lejeune of the USMC, the division's current commander, at Marbache, France, August 11, 1918.

In July, due to a negative assessment of his performance by Major General Andre W. Brewster, inspector general of the AEF, Bundy was "kicked upstairs" and assigned to command of the newly created VI Corps. Brigadier General James Harbord, formerly the chief of staff of the AEF before taking command of the 4th Marine Brigade, succeeded Bundy in command of the 2nd Division. In his new position, Bundy conducted activities that aided in the successful execution of the Belfort Ruse, designed to deceive the Germans prior to the Battle of Saint-Mihiel, which began on September 12.

He was not to remain there for very long, however, as later that month Bundy was named to command the skeleton VII Corps, a unit which only existed on paper and which he led until he returned to the United States shortly before the Armistice with Germany on November 11, 1918, which brought an end to hostilities.

For his services in the war, Bundy received the French Legion of Honor (Commander) and French Croix de Guerre with Palm.

== Later career ==
Following World War I, Bundy was appointed to command Fort Lee, Virginia, where he remained until August 1920. In June 1920, he returned to his permanent rank of brigadier general. From 1920 to 1922, he commanded the Seventh Corps Area at Fort Crook, Nebraska, and in December 1921 he was promoted to permanent major general. Bundy was commander of the Philippine Division from April 1922 to March 1924. From May 1924 until June 1925, he was commander of the Fifth Corps Area at Fort Hayes, Ohio.

== Later life and death ==
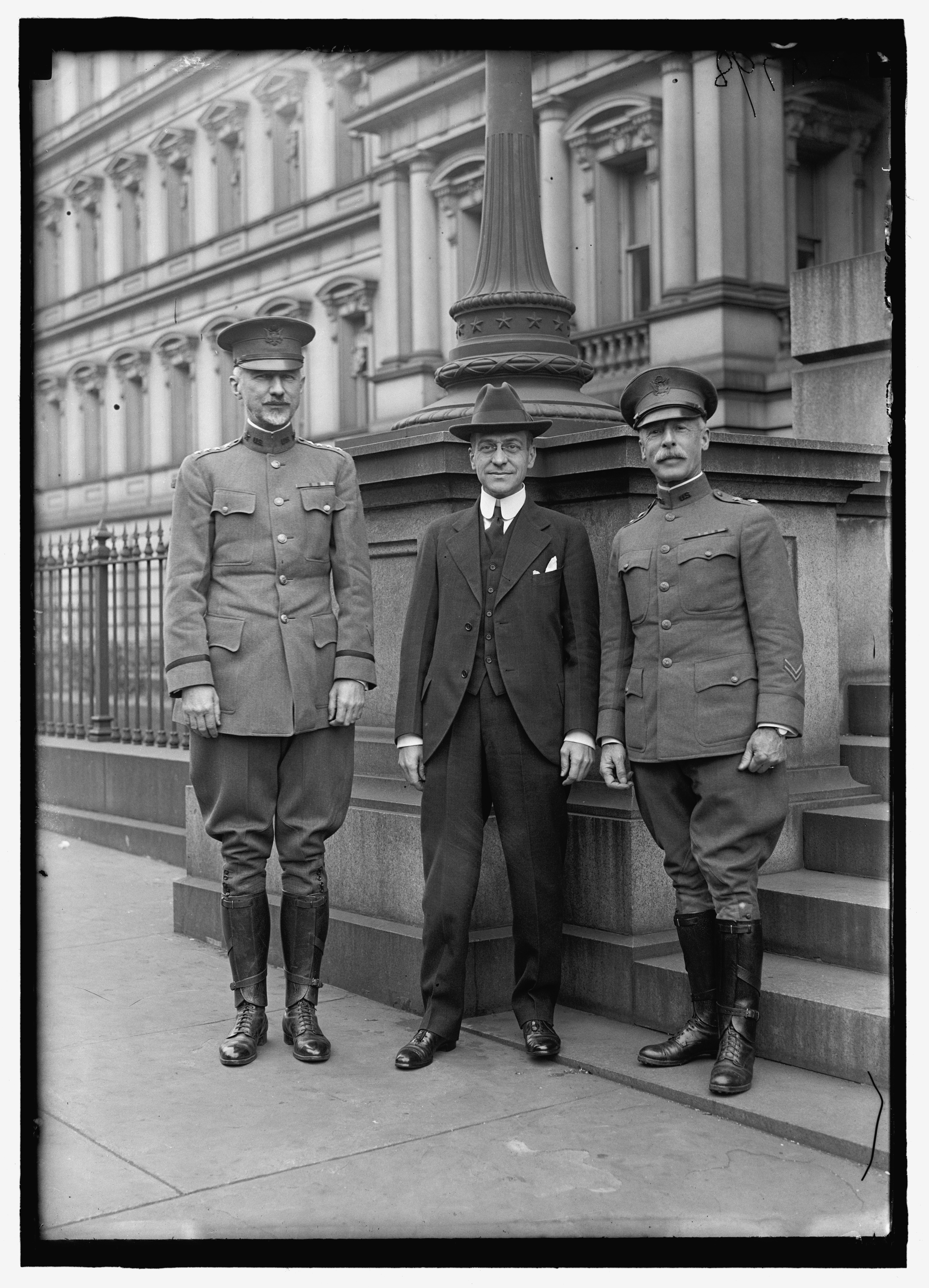
From left to right: General Peyton C. March, Secretary of War Newton D. Baker, and Major General Omar Bundy.

Bundy completed his military service on June 17, 1925, when he reached the mandatory retirement age of 64. At his retirement, Bundy was awarded the Army Distinguished Service Medal. (Note: Newspaper stories at the time of Bundy's retirement indicated he had not received a U.S. award for his World War I service. According to contemporary reports, in one version of events, Pershing was unhappy with Bundy because his insubordination before the Belleau Wood battle caused a rift between senior French and American leaders. In another, Pershing was disappointed with Bundy's performance as a division commander. In June 1925, news stories indicated that President Calvin Coolidge intended to review the matter. Members of Congress who supported recognition of Bundy's wartime achievements introduced legislation in 1925 which would have authorized the army to award him the Medal of Honor. No subsequent stories during Bundy's life indicated that he received an award, but later sources including his death notice in the West Point alumni association's annual report for 1940 indicated that he received the Distinguished Service Medal.) In January 1934, President Franklin D. Roosevelt presented him the 2nd Division Medal, a commemorative decoration awarded by the 2nd Division Veterans' Association.

In 1938, Bundy suffered a stroke that left him partly paralyzed and in ill health. He died in Washington, D.C., on January 20, 1940, at the age of 78 and just four months after the outbreak of World War II in Europe. Bundy was buried in Section 3 of Arlington National Cemetery.

== Family ==
On November 27, 1889, Bundy married Adda Love "Addie" Harden (1866–1953) in a ceremony that took place at New Castle's First Presbyterian Church. Her father William H. Harden was the treasurer of Henry County, Indiana. They remained married until his death and had no children.

== Legacy ==
In 1919, Bundy was awarded the honorary degree of LL.D. from DePauw University.

Bundy's World War I heroism was recognized in a poem by Willis O. Robb, Where Bundy Held the Paris Road.

A United States Navy troop transport ship built for World War II, USS General Omar Bundy (AP-152), was named in Bundy's honor. The ship was launched in August 1944 and after the war was sold for commercial use and renamed. It remained in service until 1980, when it was reported as missing and presumed sunk.

== Notes ==
Military offices
| Preceded by Charles A. Doyen | Commanding General 2nd Division; 1917–1918 | Succeeded by James Harbord |
| Preceded by Newly activated organization | Commanding General Seventh Corps Area; 1920–1922 | Succeeded by Francis J. Kernan |
| Preceded by Newly activated organization | Commanding General Philippine Division; 1922–1924 | Succeeded by Douglas MacArthur |
