= Francis Henry French =

United States Army general

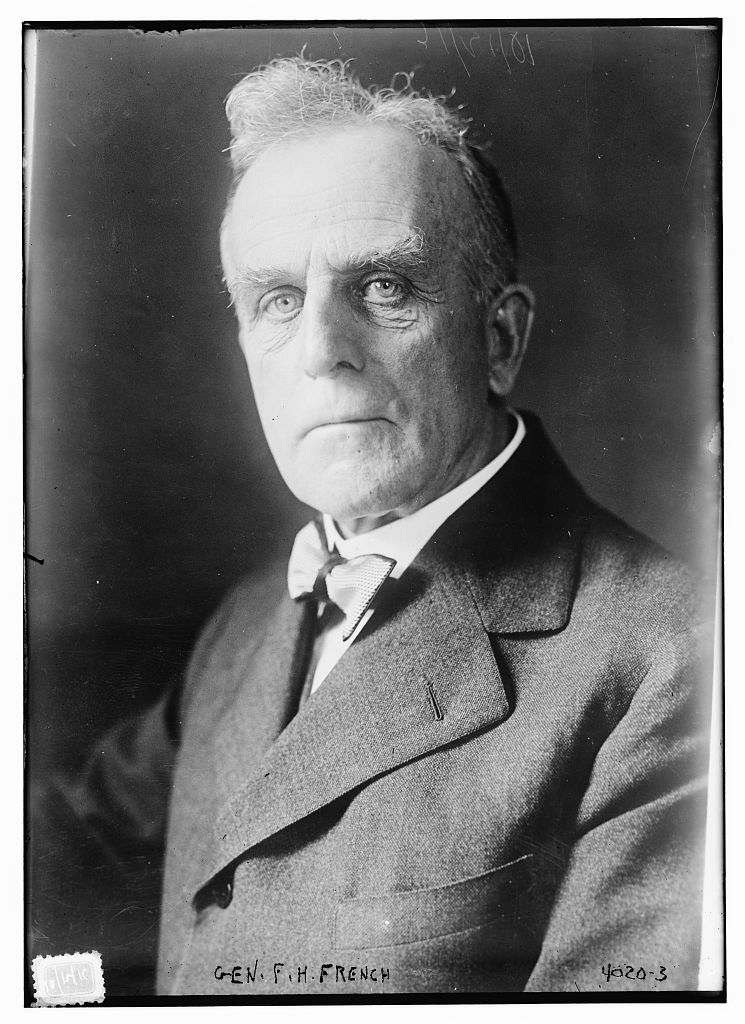
- Francis Henry French in 1916
- Born: September 27, 1857; Fort Wayne, Indiana, U.S.
- Died: March 10, 1921 (aged 63); Walter Reed Hospital
- Spouse: Amelia Maud F. Wright (m. 1894)
- Military career
- Branch: United States Army
- Service years: 1879 – 1920
- Rank: Major General
- Commands: 28th Infantry Regiment; 2nd Infantry Regiment; 21st Infantry Regiment

Major-General Francis Henry French (September 27, 1857 – March 10, 1921) served in three wars: American Indian Wars, the Spanish–American War, and World War I.

== Early and personal life ==
He was born on September 27, 1857, in Fort Wayne, Indiana to Rufus M. French and Maria C. Rudisill. He married Amelia Maud F. Wright on January 24, 1894, in Detroit, Michigan.

== Military career ==
He was appointed to the United States Military Academy in 1875, and graduated in 1879.

He served frontier duty from 1879 to 1889 in the American Indian Wars.

During his career, he served in and or commanded the 2nd, 11th, 12th, 16th, 21st and 28th Infantry Regiments. He was appointed brigadier general in September 1916.

He served at Camp Jackson in Columbia, South Carolina, during World War I. In 1917 he was in Europe, inspecting the US and Allied forces in France.

He retired in January 1920.

He died on March 10, 1921, at Walter Reed Hospital in Washington, District of Columbia. He was buried in Arlington National Cemetery.
