= USS General H. L. Scott =

General G. O. Squier-class transport ship by the US Navy

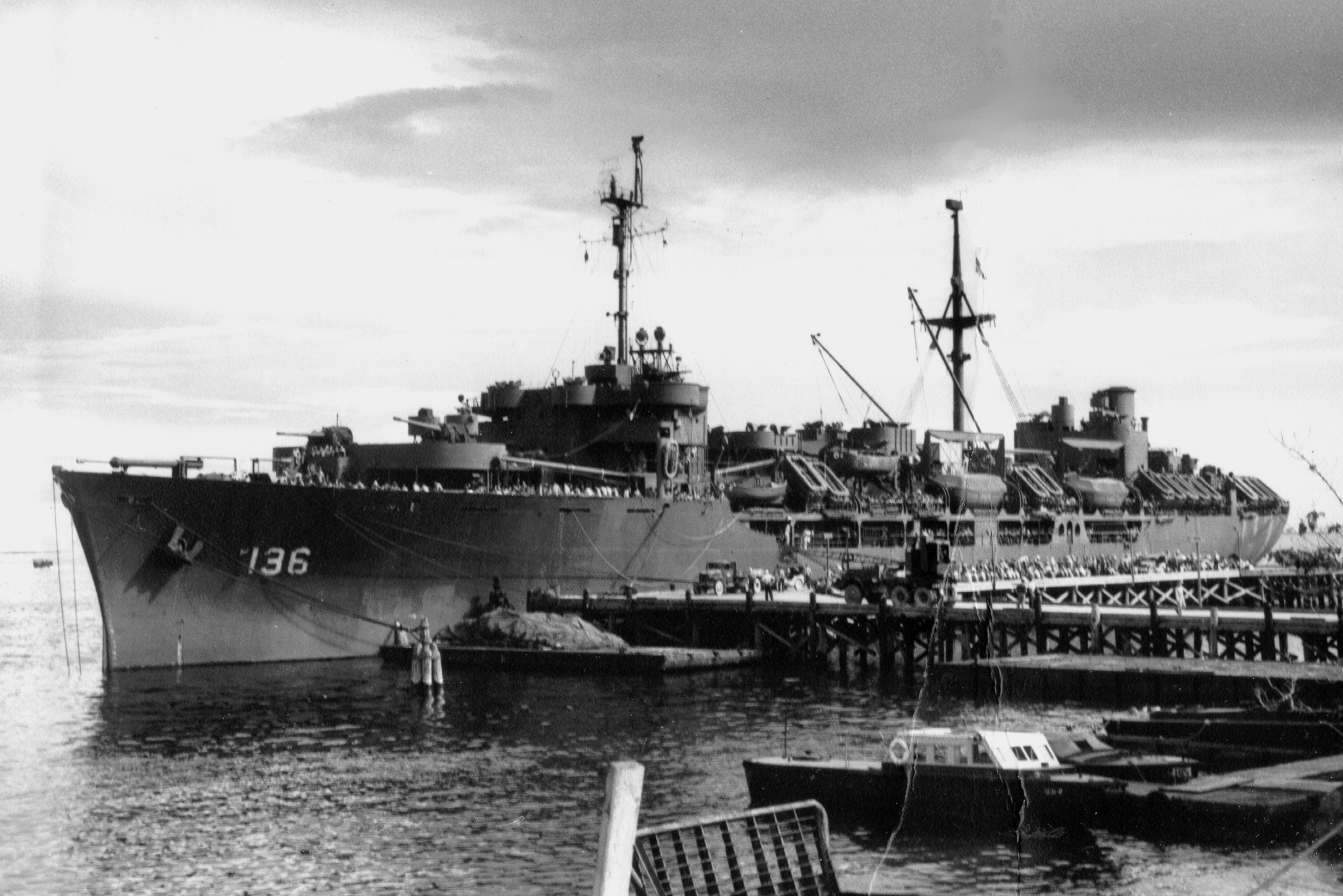
- USS General H. L. Scott (AP-136) in port, circa in 1945

History

United States
- Name: General H. L. Scott
- Namesake: Hugh Lenox Scott
- Builder: Kaiser Co., Inc.; Richmond, California
- Laid down: 20 December 1942
- Launched: 19 September 1943
- Acquired: 6 March 1944
- Commissioned: 3 April 1944
- Decommissioned: 29 May 1946
- Renamed: SS Yorkmar
- Reclassified: T-AP-136, 1 March 1950
- Fate: Scrapped 1974

General characteristics
- Class & type: General G. O. Squier-class transport ship
- Displacement: 9,950 tons (light), 17,250 tons (full)
- Length: 522 ft 10 in (159.36 m)
- Beam: 71 ft 6 in (21.79 m)
- Draft: 26 ft 6 in (8.08 m)
- Propulsion: single-screw steam turbine with 9,900 shp (7,400 kW)
- Speed: 17 knots (31 km/h)
- Capacity: 3,823 troops
- Complement: 425 (officers and enlisted)
- Armament: 4 × 5"/38 caliber guns; 8 × 1.1"/75 AA guns; 16 × 20 mm Oerlikon AA guns

USS General H. L. Scott (AP-136) was a General G. O. Squier-class transport ship for the U.S. Navy in World War II. The ship was crewed by the U.S. Coast Guard until decommissioning. She was named in honor of U.S. Army general Hugh Lenox Scott. She was sold in 1965 for commercial operation under the name SS Yorkmar, before being scrapped in 1974.

== Operational history ==
General H. L. Scott (AP-136) was laid down 20 December 1942 under a Maritime Commission contract (MC #659) by Kaiser Co., Inc., Yard 3, Richmond, California; launched 19 September 1943; sponsored by Mrs. Walter K. Wilson; acquired by the Navy 6 March 1944; and commissioned 3 April at San Francisco.

After shakedown off San Diego, General H. L. Scott departed San Francisco 5 May with reinforcement troops embarked for the South Pacific. Arriving Nouméa, New Caledonia, 21 May, she returned to San Francisco 7 June to continue transporting men and supplies to island bases in the Pacific. As American naval power drove nearer to the heart of the Japanese Empire, she made six voyages to the western Pacific between 10 June 1944 and 2 July 1945, carrying her passengers and cargo out of San Francisco to the Marshalls, the New Hebrides, New Caledonia, New Guinea, the Admiralties, and the Philippines. In addition, she operated for a time in the western Pacific as Pacific Fleet receiving ship. While at Ulithi, Caroline Islands, 25 March, she embarked 1,004 officers and men from USS Franklin (CV-13), severely damaged 19 March off the coast of Japan.

General H. L. Scott departed San Francisco 7 July for New York, where she arrived 21 July. She sailed 3 August for the Mediterranean and embarked veteran troops at Naples and Leghorn, Italy, before returning to Boston 27 August. Between 2 September and October, she steamed via the Suez Canal to Calcutta, India, and Colombo, Ceylon, on "Magic-Carpet" duty to transport troops back to the United States. She arrived New York 28 October, sailed 10 November for China, and arrived Shanghai 11 December to support Nationalist forces during the protracted struggle for control of the Chinese mainland.

General H. L. Scott returned to Seattle 30 December. On 5 February 1946 she sailed for the Far East with occupation troops embarked. After touching at Jinsen, Korea, and Shanghai, she returned to Seattle 20 March. She decommissioned 29 May and was returned to WSA 3 June.

She entered the National Defense Fleet and was berthed in Puget Sound until sold to Bethlehem Steel Corp. 31 July 1964. She was converted to a general cargo ship in 1965 for Bethlehem's subsidiary Calmar Line and operated under the name SS Yorkmar, USCG ON 294261, until scrapped in 1974.

== Sources ==
- Williams, Greg H. (2013). World War II U.S. Navy Vessels in Private Hands. McFarland Books. ISBN 978-0-7864-6645-0.
