= USS General J. R. Brooke =

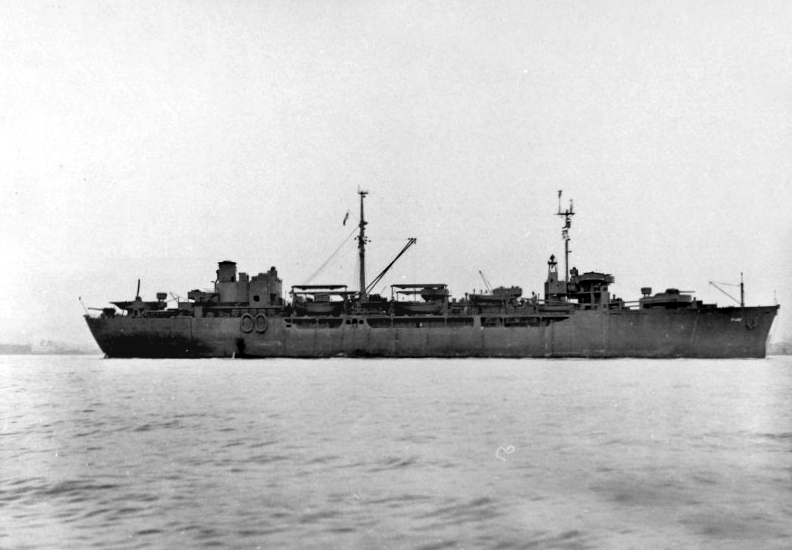
- USS General J.R. Brooke (AP-132) off the Mare Island Naval Shipyard, California, on 29 January 1944

History

United States
- Name: General J.R. Brooke
- Namesake: John Rutter Brooke
- Builder: Kaiser Co., Inc.; Richmond, California
- Laid down: date unknown
- Launched: 21 February 1943
- Acquired: 10 December 1943
- Commissioned: 20 January 1944
- Decommissioned: 18 July 1946
- Renamed: SS Marymar, April 1964
- Identification: IMO number: 6413742
- Fate: Scrapped 1979

General characteristics
- Class & type: General G. O. Squier-class transport ship
- Displacement: 9,950 tons (light), 17,250 tons (full)
- Length: 522 ft 10 in (159.36 m)
- Beam: 71 ft 6 in (21.79 m)
- Draft: 26 ft 6 in (8.08 m)
- Propulsion: single-screw steam turbine with 9,900 shp (7,400 kW)
- Speed: 17 knots (31 km/h)
- Capacity: 3,444 troops
- Complement: 471 (officers and enlisted)
- Armament: 4 × 5"/38 caliber guns; 8 × 1.1"/75 AA guns; 16 × 20 mm Oerlikon AA guns

USS General J. R. Brooke (AP-132) was a General G. O. Squier-class transport ship for the U.S. Navy in World War II. She was named in honor of U.S. Army general John Rutter Brooke. Decommissioned in 1946, she was sold privately in 1964 and renamed SS Marymar, and was scrapped in 1979.

== Operational history ==
General J. R. Brooke was laid down under a Maritime Commission contract 29 June 1942 by the Kaiser Co., Inc., Yard 3, Richmond, California; launched 21 February 1943; sponsored by Mrs. Helen Thompson; acquired by the Navy 10 December 1943; converted to a transport by Matson Navigation Co., San Francisco; and commissioned 20 January 1944 at San Francisco.

On her maiden voyage, General J. R. Brooke sailed from Port Hueneme 24 February 1944 with more than 3,600 troops, mostly Seabees, for Pearl Harbor and returned to San Francisco 8 March. From 19 March to 23 April she made a round-trip voyage out of San Francisco to bring 3,600 men to Nouméa and Espiritu Santo. Following her return, the ship sailed again 12 May for New Guinea to debark 3,400 troops at Oro Bay, and steamed thence to New York, where she arrived 3 July 1944.

Convoyed by ships and planes and under constant threat of submarine attack, General J. R. Brooke operated in the Atlantic throughout the remainder of the war. In her unflagging efforts to insure an even flow of men from the United States to the European Theater, she made 12 transatlantic voyages (8 from New York, 2 from Boston, and 2 from Norfolk) to the United Kingdom (Plymouth, Liverpool, and Southampton); Italy (Naples); France (Cherbourg, Marseilles, and Le Havre); and North Africa (Oran) from 26 July 1944 to 5 September 1945. She brought to the European ports tens of thousands of American and Allied fighting men and thousands of tons of vital supplies; and she brought to the United States countless German prisoners of war (POWs).

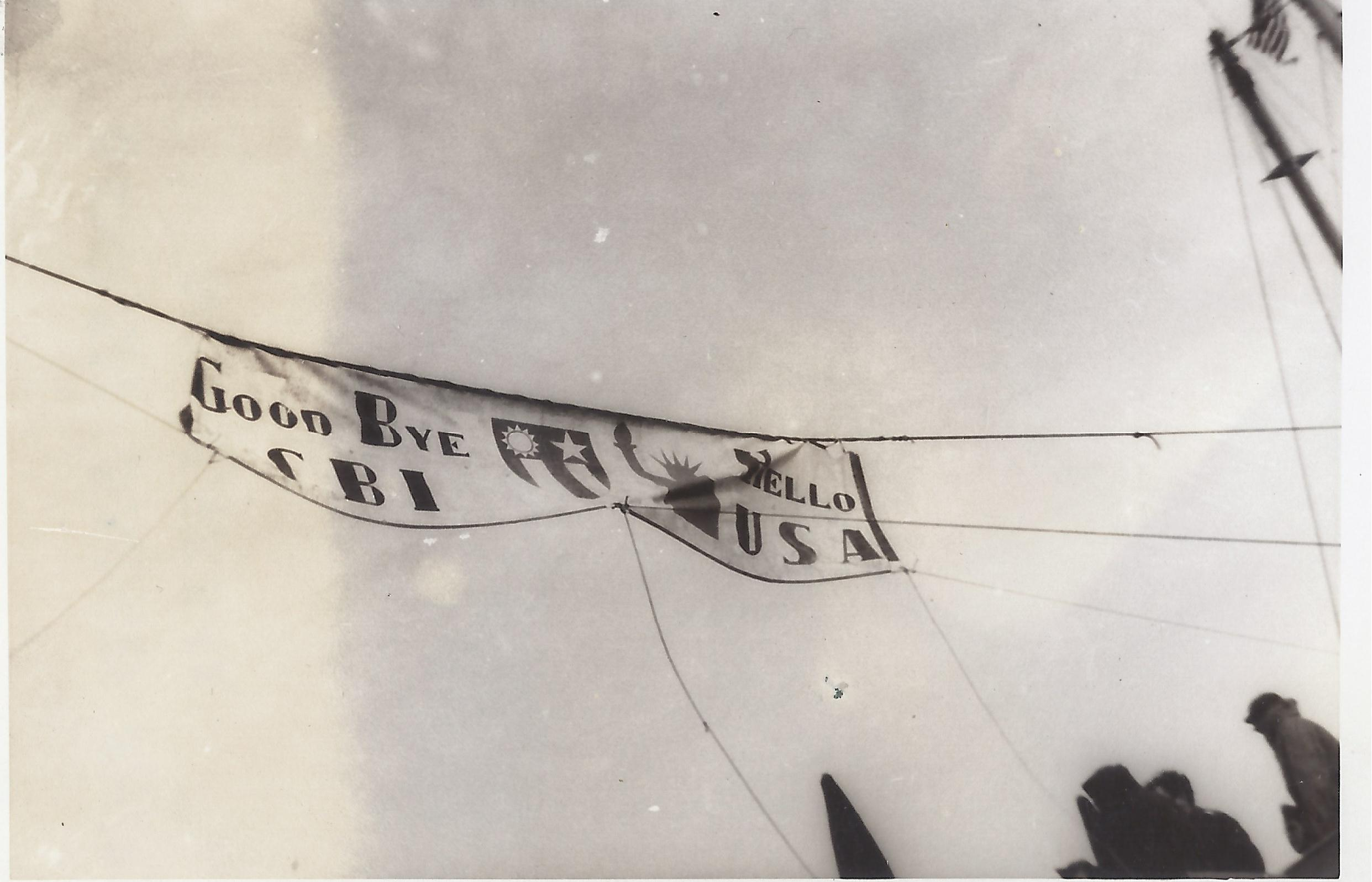

After the war's end, General J. R. Brooke made two "Magic-Carpet" and troop-rotation voyages from New York to Calcutta and Ceylon via the Suez Canal from 11 September 1945 to 3 January 1946. Subsequently, she made five identical troop-carrying voyages from New York to Le Havre between 19 January and 10 June 1946. In May 1946 she transported over 2,700 German POW's back to France. General J. R. Brooke moored at Norfolk 13 June and decommissioned at Newport News 3 July 1946. Returned to the WSA on 18 July 1946, she entered the National Defense Reserve Fleet, James River, Virginia.

She was sold to Bethlehem Steel Wilmington of Wilmington, Delaware in April 1964, rebuilt as a general cargo ship for Bethlehem's subsidiary Calmar Line, and renamed SS Marymar, USCG ON 294730, IMO 6413742. The ship was sold and renamed Mary in 1976 and was scrapped in 1979.

== Sources ==
- Williams, Greg H. (2013). World War II U.S. Navy Vessels in Private Hands. McFarland Books. ISBN 978-0-7864-6645-0.
