= USS General O. H. Ernst =

General G. O. Squier-class transport ship for the U.S. Navy in World War II

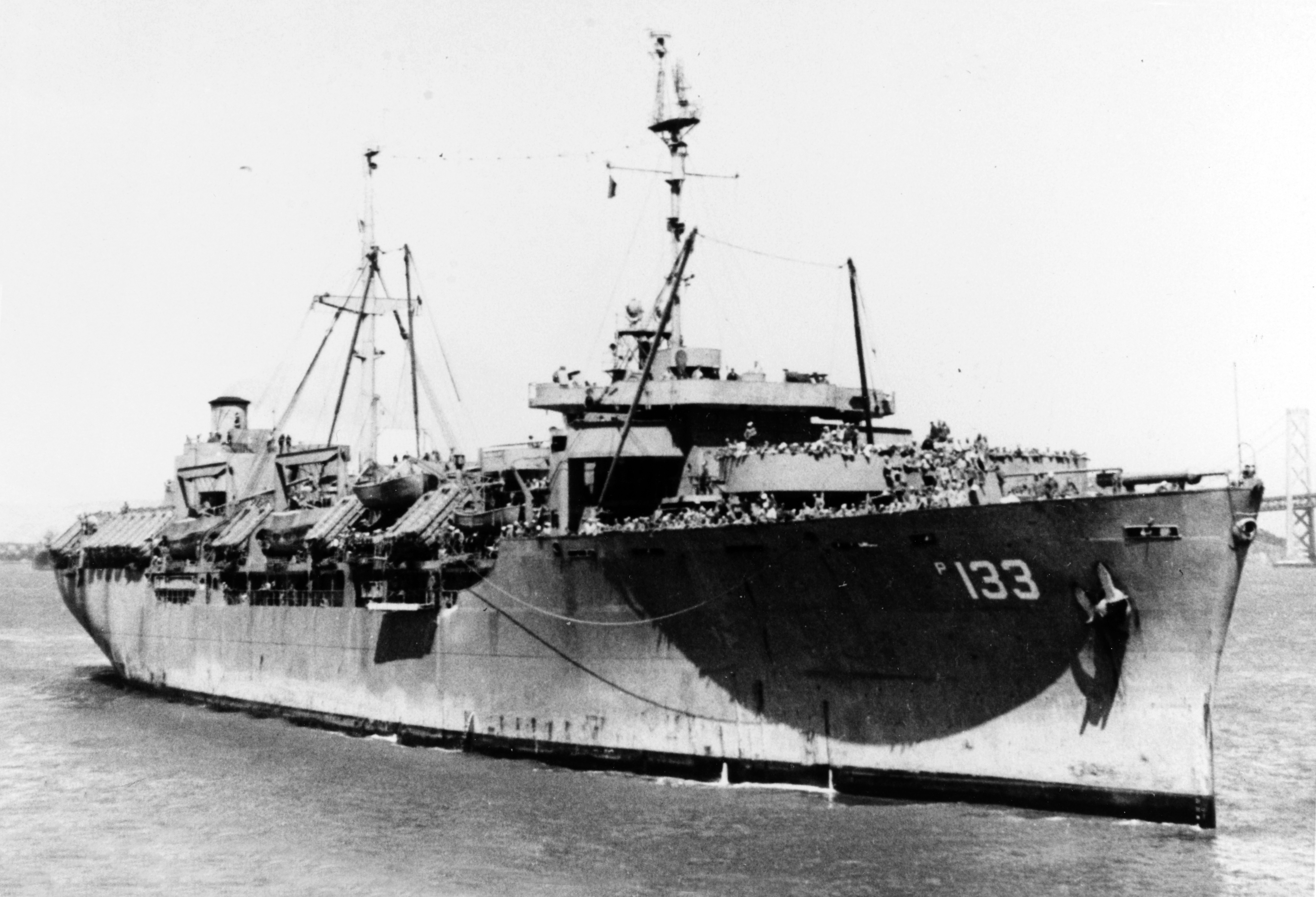
- USS General O. H. Ernst (AP-133) in San Francisco Bay, California, circa 1945-1946

History

United States
- Name: General O. H. Ernst
- Namesake: Oswald Herbert Ernst
- Builder: Kaiser Co., Inc.; Richmond, California
- Laid down: 29 June 1942
- Launched: 14 April 1943
- Acquired: 31 March 1944
- Commissioned: 22 April 1944; 15 July 1944
- Decommissioned: 13 May 1944; 15 August 1946
- In service: USAT General O. H. Ernst, 1946
- Out of service: date unknown
- Renamed: USAT General O. H. Ernst, 1946; SS Calmar, April 1964
- Identification: IMO number: 6413754
- Fate: Scrapped 1980

General characteristics
- Class & type: General G. O. Squier-class transport ship
- Displacement: 9,950 tons (light), 17,250 tons (full)
- Length: 522 ft 10 in (159.36 m)
- Beam: 71 ft 6 in (21.79 m)
- Draft: 26 ft 6 in (8.08 m)
- Propulsion: single-screw steam turbine with 9,900 shp (7,400 kW)
- Speed: 17 knots (31 km/h)
- Capacity: 3,343 troops
- Complement: 426 (officers and enlisted)
- Armament: 4 × 5"/38 caliber guns; 8 × 1.1"/75 AA guns; 16 × 20 mm Oerlikon AA guns

USS General O. H. Ernst (AP-133) was a General G. O. Squier-class transport ship for the U.S. Navy in World War II. She was named in honor of U.S. Army general Oswald Herbert Ernst. She was decommissioned in 1946 and transferred to the Army Transport Service as USAT General O. H. Ernst. She was sold privately in 1964 and renamed SS Calmar, and was scrapped in 1980.

== Operational history ==
General O. H. Ernst was laid down under Maritime Commission contract 29 June 1942 by Kaiser Co., Inc., Yard 3, Richmond, California; launched 14 April 1943; sponsored by Mrs. L. M. Giannini; acquired by the Navy 31 March 1944; commissioned 22 April 1944 transferred to Portland, Oregon for conversion to a transport by Commercial Iron Works; decommissioned 13 May 1944; and recommissioned 15 July 1944.

General O. H. Ernst sailed from Seattle 27 August 1944; and, after embarking more than 3,000 fighting men at Honolulu, she transported troops to Guadalcanal, Manus, and Ulithi before returning to San Diego 4 December. Underway again 10 days later, she carried troops to Guadalcanal and promptly returned to the West Coast, reaching Seattle 20 January 1945. Following a round-trip voyage during February to Honolulu and back to San Francisco, the busy transport made a round-trip voyage between 17 March and 22 May, carrying troops from San Francisco to the New Hebrides, New Caledonia, New Guinea, Leyte, and the Admiralties.

General O. H. Ernst departed San Francisco 30 May for the Panama Canal and Europe; and, after embarking veterans at Le Havre, France, she steamed to Norfolk, arriving 2 July. A week later she departed for Naples, Italy, and carried troops thence via the Panama Canal to Hollandia, New Guinea, where she arrived 27 August. Touching Manila 2 September, the ship departed Tacloban 15 September for San Pedro, Los Angeles, arriving 1 October. As part of the post-war "Magic-Carpet" fleet, she, between 1 November and 29 July 1946, made six troop-rotation voyages out of San Pedro and Seattle to Japan, Korea, Okinawa, and Pearl Harbor.

General O. H. Ernst returned to San Francisco from the Far East 29 July 1946, decommissioned there 15 August, and was returned to the WSA the same day. She was then transferred to the Transportation Service of the U.S. Army. USAT General O. H. Ernst made at least one trip from the Philippines, arriving in San Francisco on 30 September 1946.

She later entered the National Defense Reserve Fleet at Suisun Bay, California.

She was sold to Bethlehem Steel Wilmington (aka Harlan and Hollingsworth) of Wilmington, Delaware in April 1964, renamed SS Calmar, USCG ON 294756, IMO 6413754, and rebuilt into a general cargo ship for Bethlehem's subsidiary Calmar Line. In 1974 the ship was sold to Compañía Anónima Venezolana de Navegación (CAVN) and renamed Orinoco. She was scrapped in 1980.

== Sources ==
- Williams, Greg H. (2013). World War II U.S. Navy Vessels in Private Hands. McFarland Books. ISBN 978-0-7864-6645-0.
