= USS General J. H. McRae =

Transport ship launched in 1944

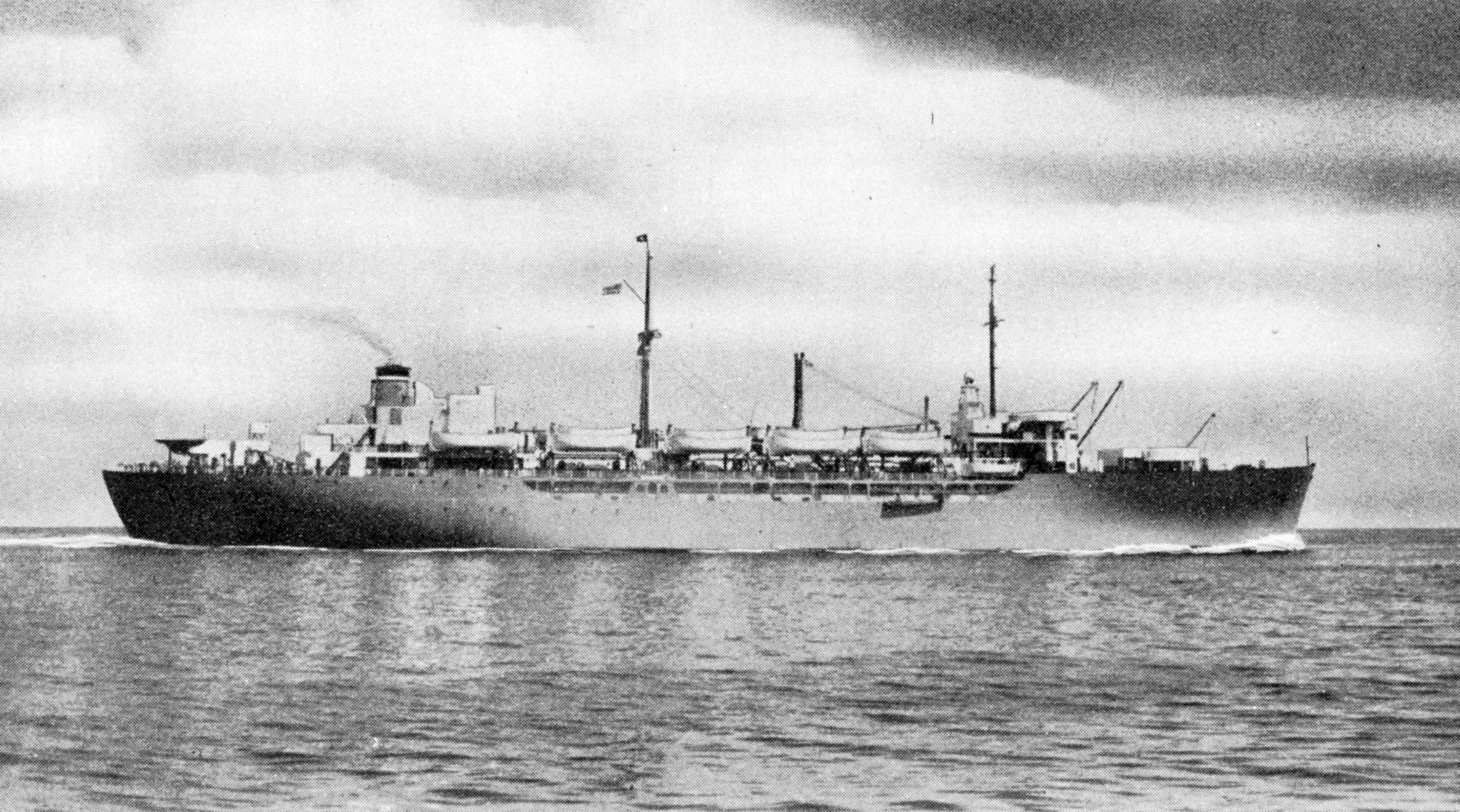
- General J. H. McRae, circa 1946-1950

History

United States
- Name: General J. H. McRae
- Namesake: James H. McRae
- Builder: Kaiser Co., Inc.; Richmond, California
- Laid down: date unknown
- Launched: 26 April 1944
- Acquired: 19 June 1944
- Commissioned: 8 August 1944
- Decommissioned: 27 February 1946
- In service: 1946 – 1 March 1950, United States Army Transportation Corps U.S. Army Transport Service; 1 March 1950 – 29 October 1954, MSTS
- Renamed: USAT General J. H. McRae, 27 February 1946; USNS General J. H. McRae, 1 March 1950
- Reclassified: T-AP-149, 1 March 1950
- Identification: IMO number: 6904820
- Fate: Scrapped 1987

General characteristics
- Class & type: General G. O. Squier-class transport ship
- Displacement: 9,950 tons (light), 17,250 tons (full)
- Length: 522 ft 10 in (159.36 m)
- Beam: 71 ft 6 in (21.79 m)
- Draft: 24 ft (7.32 m)
- Propulsion: single-screw steam turbine with 9,900 shp (7,400 kW)
- Speed: 17 knots (31 km/h)
- Capacity: 3,343 troops
- Complement: 356 (officers and enlisted)
- Armament: 4 × 5"/38 caliber guns; 8 × 1.1"/75 AA guns; 16 × 20 mm Oerlikon AA guns

USS General J. H. McRae (AP-149) was a General G. O. Squier-class transport ship built for the United States Maritime Commission during World War II. In 1946 she was transferred to the US Army and operated as USAT General J. H. McRae. On 1 March 1950 she was transferred to Military Sea Transportation Service and operated as USNS General J. H. McRae (T-AP-149). She was named for US Army Major General James H. McRae.

== Operational history ==
General J. H. McRae was launched 26 April 1944 by the Kaiser Co., Kaiser Shipyards, Yard 3, Richmond, California, completed 16 June 1944 and delivered to the Maritime Commission for assignment on a loan basis by the War Shipping Administration to the United States Navy on the same day. The ship was commissioned USS General J. H. McRae (AP-149) on 8 August 1944 at Richmond, California.

During 1944 she sailed from West Coast ports carrying troops to Honolulu, Hawaii and other Pacific Theater destinations. On 11 January 1945 she sailed for India where she picked up troops and delivered them to various South Pacific destinations. She sailed 19 June 1945 through the Panama Canal for Le Havre, France, where she embarked more than 4,000 troops and returned with them to Newport News, Virginia She moved to Staten Island, N.Y. where on 26 October 1945 she picked up 2,200 "kaki clad brethen"(The "MAC" Log)" and sailed 8,643 nmi (16,007 km; 9,946 mi) arriving at Iran's Shaht-El-Arab River on 19 November 1945. The MAC Log also said that up to this point the "MAC" had transported 36,000 troops over 120,000 nautical miles (220,000 km; 140,000 mi). She continued transporting troops from Europe and other ports through the end of 1945. She was decommissioned at New York City 27 February 1946 and was returned to War Shipping Administration (WSA) for peacetime operations as a United States Army Transport (USAT) under bareboat charter until title was transferred on 30 August 1946.

As USAT General J. H. McRae she transported troops through 1950. One typical voyage during this period was transporting troops from Manila to San Francisco in January 1947.

The Navy reacquired the ship during the mass transfer of Army ships to Navy on 1 March 1950 and assigned to the Military Sea Transportation Service (MSTS). Crewed by civilians, she operated between New York and the United Kingdom until February 1954, then shifted her base to San Francisco, California for runs to Japan.

On 29 October 1954 the General J. H. McRae was inactivated and laid up in the Pacific Reserve Fleet at San Diego, CA. On 24 February 1960 she was transferred to the Maritime Administration (MARAD) for lay up in the National Defense Reserve Fleet, Suisun Bay, Benicia, California. On 16 July 1968 title was transferred to Hudson Waterways Corp./McRae Shipping Corp. under the MARAD exchange program, and the ship was renamed SS Transhawaii, USCG ON 515621, IMO 6904820. She was converted to a container ship by the Maryland Shipbuilding and Drydock Company in 1969–1970. Upon completion on 12 March 1970 she began hauling containerized cargo for Seatrain Lines. On 5 March 1975 she was sold to the Puerto Rico Maritime Authority and renamed SS Aguadilla. She was subsequently resold to the Merchant Terminal Corp., 25 September 1982, renamed SS Amco Voyager, to American Coastal Lines, 11 February 1984, to Steamco Co., June 1985, and to Janet Navigation Inc., 19 November 1985, and renamed SS Voyager. She was sold for scrapping in Taiwan, 2 October 1986 and broken up in 1987.

General J. H. McRae received four battle stars for Korean War service.

== Sources ==
- Williams, Greg H.; "World War II U.S. Navy Vessels in Private Hands"; McFarland Books, 2013; ISBN 978-0-7864-6645-0
