= USS General G. O. Squier =

Ship built in 1943

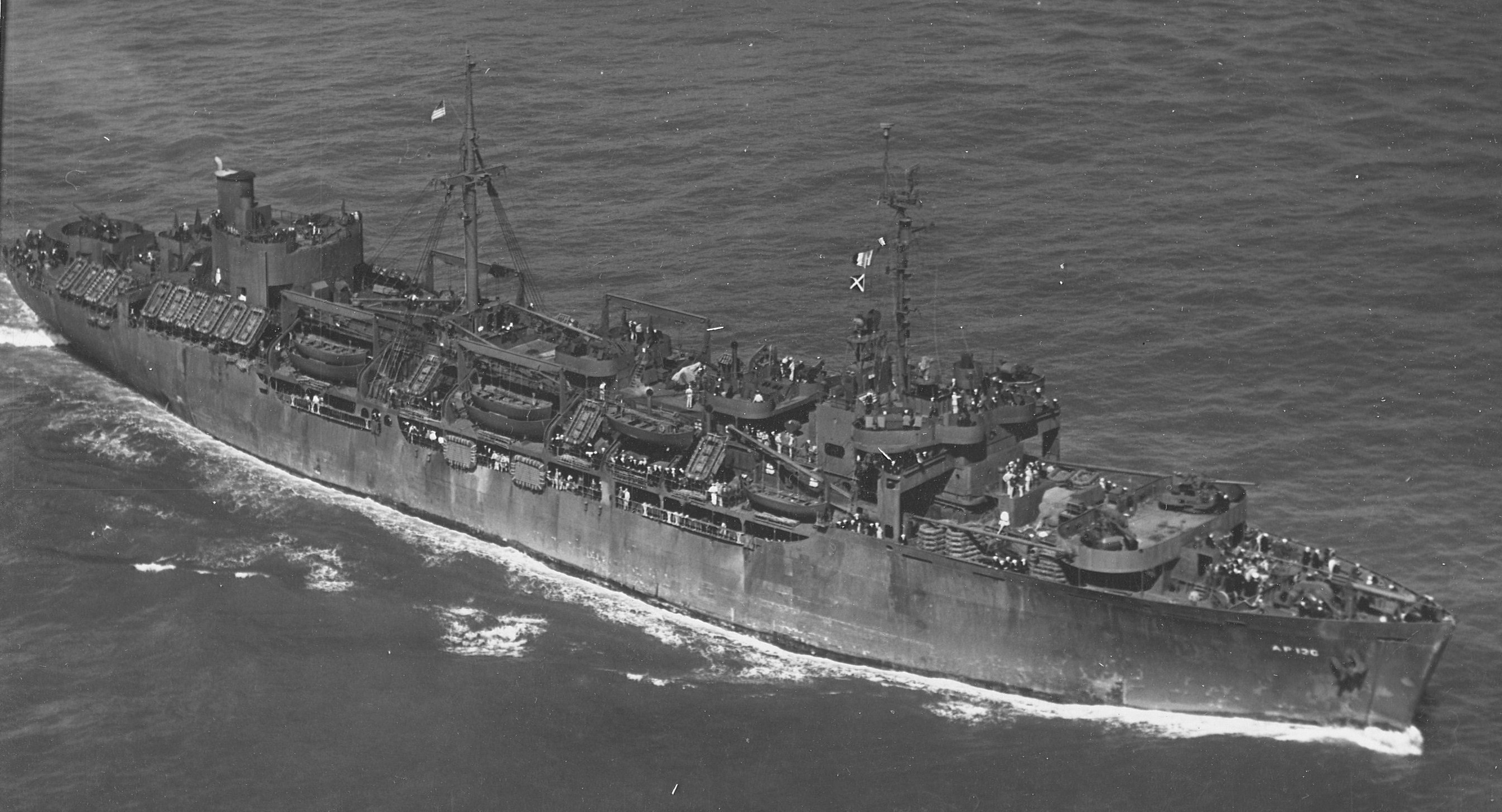
- USS General G. O. Squier (AP-130) underway off the coast of California, circa in 1944

History

United States
- Name: General G. O. Squier
- Namesake: George Owen Squier
- Builder: Kaiser Co., Inc.; Richmond, California
- Laid down: date unknown
- Launched: 11 November 1942
- Acquired: 30 August 1943
- Commissioned: 2 October 1943
- Decommissioned: 10 July 1946
- Renamed: SS Pennmar, 27 May 1965
- Identification: IMO number: 6413730
- Fate: Scrapped (date unknown)

General characteristics
- Class & type: General G. O. Squier-class transport ship
- Displacement: 9,950 tons (light), 17,250 tons (full)
- Length: 522 ft 10 in (159.36 m)
- Beam: 71 ft 6 in (21.79 m)
- Draft: 24 ft (7.32 m)
- Propulsion: single-screw steam turbine with 9,900 shp (7,400 kW)
- Speed: 17 knots (31 km/h)
- Capacity: 3,823 troops
- Complement: 356 (officers and enlisted)
- Armament: 4 × 5"/38 caliber guns; 8 × 1.1"/75 AA guns; 16 × 20 mm Oerlikon AA guns

USS General G. O. Squier (AP-130) was the lead ship of her class of transport ship for the U.S. Navy in World War II. Decommissioned in 1946, she was sold privately in 1965 and renamed SS Pennmar, and was eventually scrapped.

== Operational history ==
General G. O. Squier was launched 11 November 1942 under Maritime Commission contract (MC Hull #653) by the Kaiser Co., Inc. in Richmond, California; sponsored by Miss Mary Ann Somervell; acquired 30 August 1943 and commissioned 2 October.

General G. O. Squier made three round-trip, troop-carrying voyages out of San Francisco from 29 October 1943 to 30 March 1944 to Nouméa; Pearl Harbor, Guadalcanal, Wallis Island, Samoa, Nouméa, and Honolulu, respectively. Underway again from San Francisco 7 April she brought troops to Nouméa and Milne Bay before heading for Norfolk, where she arrived 2 June. On 1 July the ship departed with 3,300 troops for Italy, and debarked them at Naples. Following a voyage thence to Oran and back, General G. O. Squier joined Task Force 87 off Naples 13 August in preparation for Operation Dragoon, the amphibious invasion of Southern France.

Arriving off Cap Camarat 15 August, she debarked her troops into waiting LCI's which put them ashore to become another deadly prong thrust deeply into Hitler's "Heartland." The next day she headed for Oran to bring nearly 3,000 troops back to the Cap Camarat beachhead on 30 August. General G. O. Squier returned to New York 26 September with casualties and prisoners of war embarked at Naples.

From 14 October 1944 to 14 September 1945, she made 10 transatlantic, troop-carrying and rotation voyages: 7 from New York, 2 from Norfolk, and 1 from Boston, to ports in the United Kingdom (Plymouth, Southampton, and Avonmouth) and France (Le Havre and Marseilles). Between 20 September 1945 and 18 June 1946, six other round-trip, "Magic-Carpet" voyages out of New York at war's end brought home veterans from the Far East (Karachi, Calcutta, and Colombo) and Europe (Le Havre, Leghorn, and Bremerhaven). General G. O. Squier reached Norfolk 22 June and decommissioned 10 July 1946.

She was returned to the WSA on 18 July 1946 and entered the National Defense Reserve Fleet at James River in Virginia. She was sold to the Bethlehem Steel Corp. 7 April 1964, converted to a general cargo ship for Bethlehem's subsidiary Calmar Line, and renamed Pennmar, USCG ON 295108, IMO 6413730, on 27 May 1965. The ship was sold and renamed Penn in 1976, renamed Penny in 1978, and scrapped in 1984.

General G. O. Squier was awarded one battle star for World War II service.

== Sources ==
- Williams, Greg H. (2013). World War II U.S. Navy Vessels in Private Hands. McFarland Books. ISBN 978-0-7864-6645-0.
