= USS General D. E. Aultman =

World War II transport ship of the US Navy

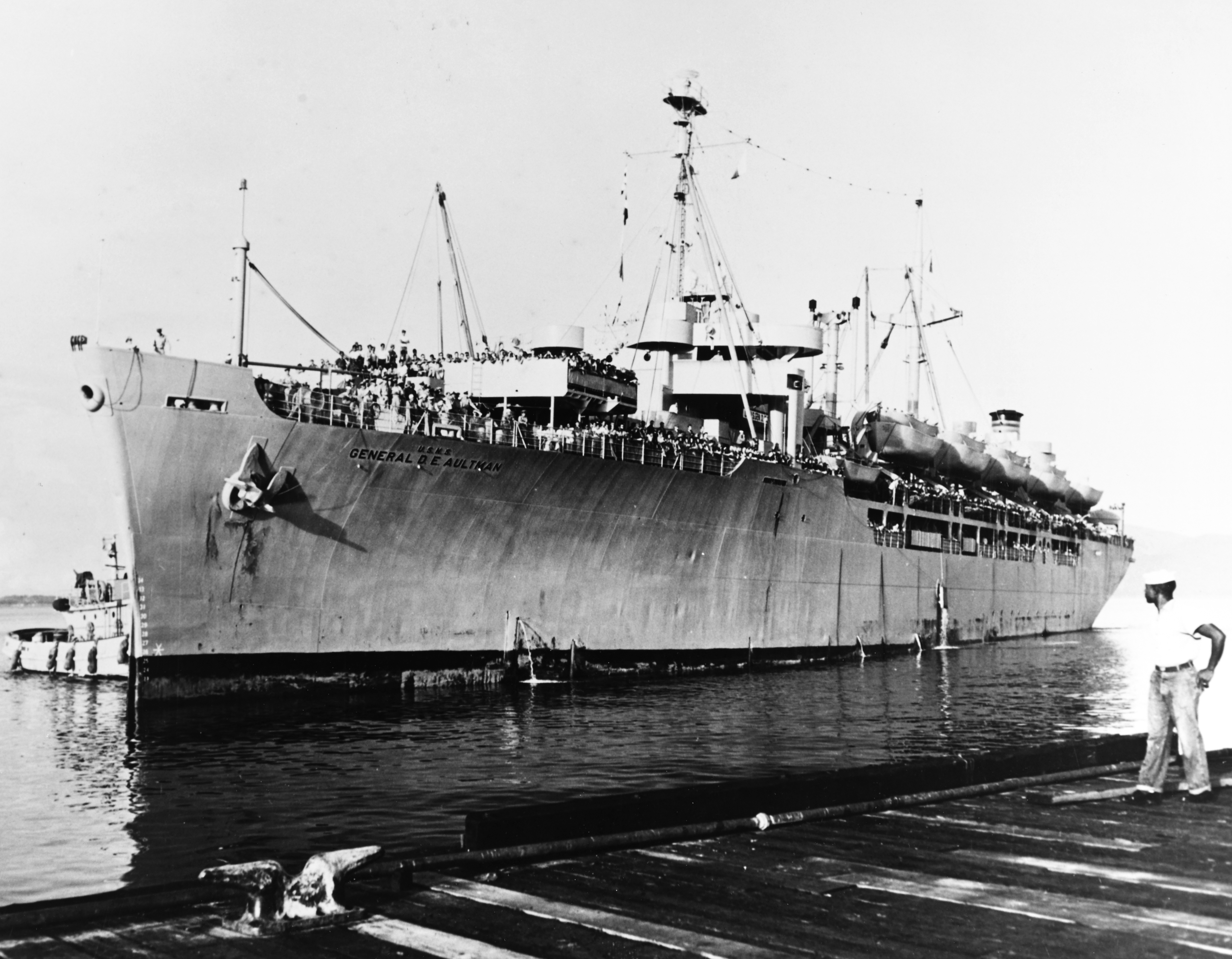
- USNS General D.E. Aultman (T-AP-156) arrives at Naval Station Subic Bay, Philippines, on 2 October 1951

History

United States
- Name: General D.E. Aultman
- Namesake: Dwight Edward Aultman
- Builder: Kaiser Co., Inc.; Richmond, California
- Laid down: date unknown
- Launched: 18 February 1945
- Acquired: 20 May 1945
- Commissioned: 20 May 1945
- Decommissioned: 15 March 1946
- In service: after 15 March 1946 (Army); 1 March 1950 (MSTS)
- Out of service: 1 March 1950 (Army); 4 June 1958 (MSTS)
- Renamed: SS Portland, 1968
- Reclassified: T-AP-156, 1 March 1950
- Identification: IMO number: 6903216
- Fate: Scrapped after October 1986

General characteristics
- Class & type: General G. O. Squier-class transport ship
- Displacement: 9,950 tons (light), 17,250 tons (full)
- Length: 522 ft 10 in (159.36 m)
- Beam: 71 ft 6 in (21.79 m)
- Draft: 24 ft (7.32 m)
- Propulsion: single-screw steam turbine with 9,900 shp (7,400 kW)
- Speed: 17 knots (31 km/h)
- Capacity: 3,823 troops
- Complement: 356 (officers and enlisted)
- Armament: 4 × 5"/38 caliber gun mounts; 4 × 40 mm AA gun mounts; 16 × 20 mm AA gun mounts

USS General D. E. Aultman (AP-156) was a General G. O. Squier-class transport ship for the U.S. Navy in World War II. The ship was crewed by the U.S. Coast Guard throughout the war. She was named in honor of U.S. Army general Dwight Edward Aultman. She was transferred to the U.S. Army as USAT General D. E. Aultman in 1946. On 1 March 1950 she was transferred to the Military Sea Transportation Service (MSTS) as USNS General D. E. Aultman (T-AP-156). She was later sold for commercial operation under the name SS Portland, before being scrapped some time after October 1986.

== Operational history ==
General D. E. Aultman (AP-156) was launched 18 February 1945 under Maritime Commission contract (MC #713) by Kaiser Co., Inc., Yard 3, Richmond, California; Sponsored by Mrs. Alma H. Aultman, widow of General Aultman; acquired by the Navy and commissioned 20 May 1945.

After shakedown out of San Diego, General D. E. Aultman got underway 30 June bound for France. She transited the Panama Canal and arrived Marseilles 24 July, embarking troops, nurses, and Red Cross workers for the Pacific theater. The transport sailed 26 July via the Panama Canal and found herself 1 day out of Balboa bound for New Guinea when the Japanese capitulated 15 August.

General D. E. Aultman arrived Humboldt Bay, New Guinea 4 September, and carried troops to Manila before returning to Portland 11 October 1945. She was then assigned to the "Magic-Carpet" fleet, contributing her important part to the gigantic task of returning the hundreds of thousands of Pacific veterans. She made two "Magic-Carpet" voyages to the Far East before decommissioning at San Francisco 15 March 1946. She was returned to the Maritime Commission for transfer to the Army Transportation Service, serving in the Pacific.

Reacquired by the Navy 1 March 1950, General D. E. Aultman joined the MSTS with a civil service crew and resumed her support of American posts in the Pacific. After the outbreak of the Korean War in June 1950, the transport began the vital job of transporting troops to that strategic country. The veteran ship sailed to the western Pacific until she was returned to the Maritime Commission 4 June 1958. She entered the National Defense Reserve Fleet, Suisun Bay, California, where she remained until sold to Containership Chartering Service of Wilmington, Delaware for commercial use in 1967 under the MARAD Ship Exchange Program.

The ship was rebuilt in 1968 by Willamette Iron & Steel Co., Portland, OR as the container ship SS Portland, USCG ON 511487, IMO 6903216, for Sea Land Service. She was sold for scrapping in Taiwan in December 1986.

== Sources ==
- Cudahy, Brian J. (2006). Box Boats: How Container Ships Changed the World. Fordham University Press. ISBN 978-0-8232-2569-9.
- Williams, Greg H. (2013). World War II U.S. Navy Vessels in Private Hands. McFarland Books. ISBN 978-0-7864-6645-0.
