= USS General R. L. Howze =

Transport ship

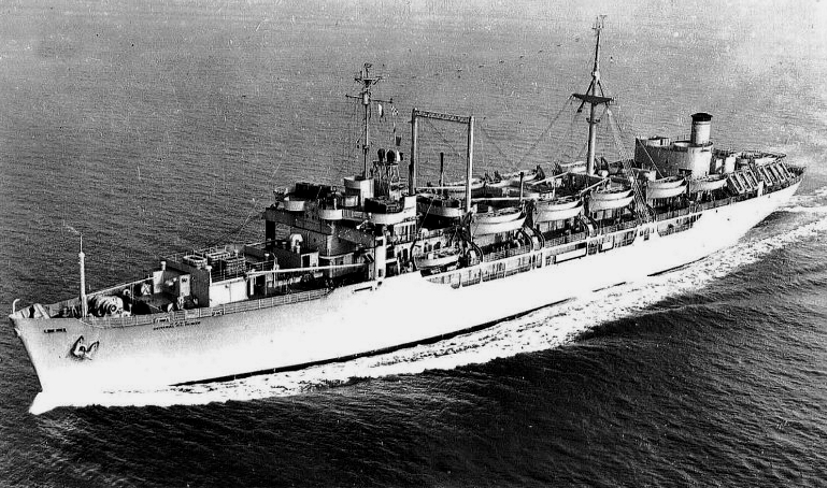
- USNS General R. L. Howze (T-AP-134) underway at sea, in the 1950s

History

United States
- Name: General R. L. Howze
- Namesake: Robert Lee Howze
- Builder: Kaiser Co., Inc.; Richmond, California
- Laid down: 22 July 1942
- Launched: 23 May 1943
- Acquired: 31 December 1943
- Commissioned: 7 February 1944
- Decommissioned: 6 August 1947
- In service: 1948 (Army); 1 March 1950 (MSTS)
- Out of service: 1 March 1950 (Army); 15 July 1957 (MSTS)
- Renamed: SS Austral Glen
- Reclassified: T-AP-134, 1 March 1950
- Identification: IMO number: 6904832
- Fate: Scrapped 1980

General characteristics
- Class & type: General G. O. Squier-class transport ship
- Displacement: 9,950 tons (light), 17,250 tons (full)
- Length: 522 ft 10 in (159.36 m)
- Beam: 71 ft 6 in (21.79 m)
- Draft: 24 ft (7.32 m)
- Propulsion: single-screw steam turbine with 9,900 shp (7,400 kW)
- Speed: 17 knots (31 km/h)
- Capacity: 3,530 troops
- Complement: 356 (officers and enlisted)
- Armament: 4 × 5"/38 caliber guns; 8 × 1.1"/75 AA guns; 16 × 20 mm Oerlikon AA guns

USS General R. L. Howze (AP-134) was a General G. O. Squier-class transport ship for the U.S. Navy in World War II. The ship was crewed by the U.S. Coast Guard throughout the war. She was named in honor of U.S. Army general Robert Lee Howze. She was transferred to the U.S. Army as USAT General R. L. Howze in 1946. On 1 March 1950 she was transferred to the Military Sea Transportation Service (MSTS) as USNS General R. L. Howze (T-AP-134). She was later sold for commercial operation under the name SS Austral Glen, before being scrapped in 1980.

== Operational history ==
General R. L. Howze (AP-134) was laid down under Maritime Commission contract (MC #657) 22 July 1942 by Kaiser Co., Inc., Yard 3, Richmond, California; launched 23 May 1943; sponsored by Mrs. W. C. Gardenshire; acquired by the Navy 31 December 1943; converted to a transport by Matson Navigation Co., San Francisco; and commissioned at San Francisco 7 February 1944.

After shakedown off San Diego, the transport loaded supplies, embarked troops at San Francisco, and sailed 20 March 1944 for New Guinea. General R. L. Howze carried troops to Milne Bay and Lae to support the American buildup of pressure in the southwest Pacific, returning to San Francisco 2 May 1944. Subsequently, the ship steamed to Guadalcanal, Manus, Eniwetok, and many other islands as the rising tide of the Navy's amphibious offensive swept toward Japan. She carried troops, supplies, and even Japanese prisoners of war on a total of 11 voyages to the combat areas of the Pacific, before returning to San Francisco 15 October 1945, after the Japanese surrender.

In November, General R. L. Howze steamed to the Philippines to bring home veterans, and sailed 10 January 1946 for England with 3,400 German prisoners. After touching at Liverpool 31 January, she brought American troops from Le Havre to New York 16 February, and made a final voyage to France for more returning veterans. General R. L. Howze decommissioned at New York 1 April 1946 and was returned to WSA for transfer to the War Department. She was placed in reserve in the James River 6 August 1947, and returned to the War Department as an Army Transport in 1948.

The U.S.A.T. General R. L. Howze sailed from Bremerhaven to Boston from 13 to 24 April 1949 carrying hundreds of Displaced Persons from Europe under the Displaced Persons Act of 1948. The ship made a similar voyage from Bremerhaven to New York from 22 January to 01 February 1950.

On 20 November 1949 USAT General R. L. Howze left Naples with 1,105 displaced persons from Europe and arrived in Melbourne on 17 December 1949. This voyage was one of almost 150 voyages by some 40 ships taking refugees of World War II to Australia. General R. L. Howze made one more such trip herself, arriving in Melbourne, again, with 1,316 refugees on 26 March 1950.

The veteran transport was reacquired by the Navy 1 March 1950 and joined MSTS with a civilian crew. For the next year General R. L. Howze sailed to and from Europe for the International Refugee Organization, bringing displaced persons from Eastern Europe to the United States. In mid-1951, she was transferred to the Pacific, and steamed between San Francisco or Seattle and the Far East with troop replacements for U.N. troops fighting in Korea. She continued this role during the active fighting and after the armistice.

However, in September 1954, General R. L. Howze was diverted from her normal pattern of sailings to take part in Operation Passage to Freedom. For 5 months she and other Navy ships brought tens of thousands of refugees from North to South Vietnam as that country was partitioned. According to one source, General R. L. Howze held the record for the "Passage to Freedom" ships with 38 births on board.

General R. L. Howze made two more voyages to the Far East supporting America's important readiness forces before returning to Seattle 31 December 1955. She remained inactive until entering the reserve fleet at Astoria, Oregon, 15 July 1957. The ship was finally returned to the Maritime Administration 17 July 1958 and placed in the Maritime Defense Reserve Fleet at Astoria.

In 1965 the ship was sold to Pacific Far East Line (PFEL) for commercial service and rebuilt as the container ship SS Guam Bear, USCG ON 513674, IMO 6904832. In 1974 she was renamed New Zealand Bear, and in 1975 she was sold to Farrell Lines with a name change to SS Austral Glen. The ship was laid up in New York in 1978, renamed Pacific Endeavor for service with American Pacific Containers in 1979, and then scrapped in 1981.

General R. L. Howze received six battle stars for Korean War service.

== Sources ==
- Williams, Greg H. (2013). World War II U.S. Navy Vessels in Private Hands. McFarland Books. ISBN 978-0-7864-6645-0.
