= USS General R. M. Blatchford (AP-153) =

Squier-class transport ship for the U.S. Navy

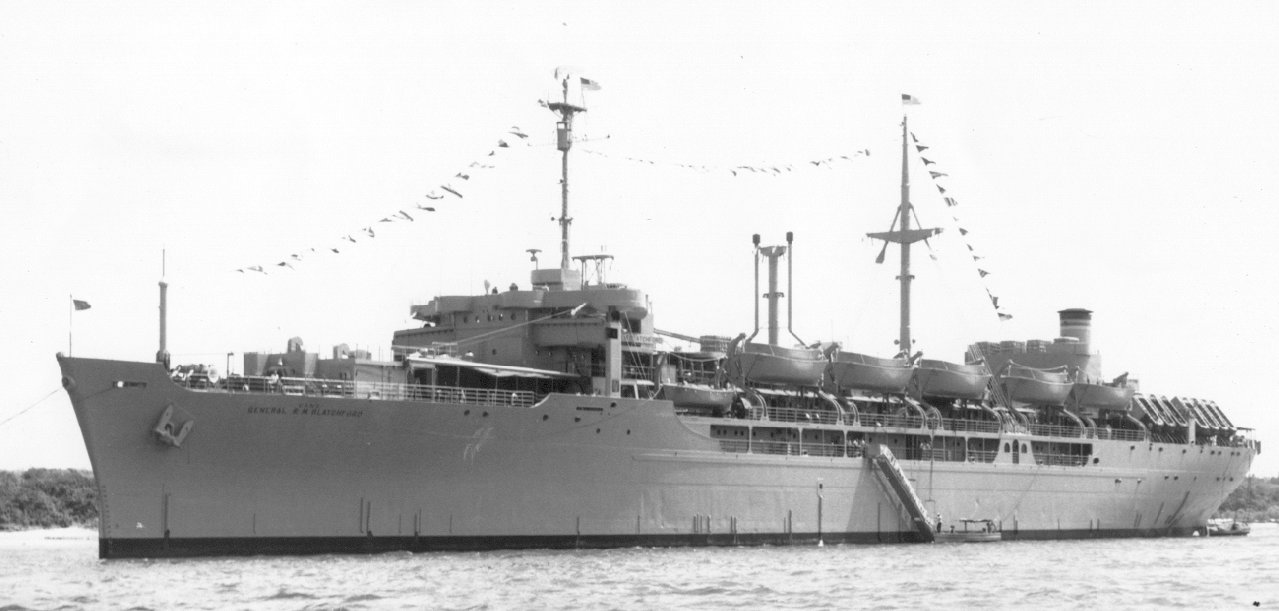
- General R. M. Blatchford (T-AP-153)

History

United States
- Name: General R. M. Blatchford
- Namesake: Richard M. Blatchford
- Builder: Kaiser Co., Inc.; Richmond, California
- Laid down: date unknown
- Launched: 27 August 1944
- Acquired: 26 January 1945
- Commissioned: 26 January 1945
- Decommissioned: 12 June 1946
- In service: after June 1946 - January 1967 (Army until 1 March 1950; MSTS thereafter)
- Out of service: January 1967
- Renamed: SS Stonewall Jackson, 1970; SS Alex Stephens, 1973
- Reclassified: T-AP-153, 1 March 1950
- Identification: IMO number: 7027227
- Fate: Sold for scrapping, 13 April 1980

General characteristics
- Class & type: General G. O. Squier-class transport ship
- Displacement: 9,950 tons (light), 17,250 tons (full)
- Length: 522 ft 10 in (159.36 m)
- Beam: 71 ft 6 in (21.79 m)
- Draft: 26 ft 6 in (8.08 m)
- Propulsion: single-screw steam turbine with 9,900 shp (7,400 kW)
- Speed: 17 knots (31 km/h)
- Capacity: 3,823 troops
- Complement: 356 (officers and enlisted)
- Armament: 4 × 5"/38 caliber guns; 8 × 1.1"/75 AA guns; 16 × 20 mm Oerlikon AA guns

USS General R. M. Blatchford (AP-153) was a General G. O. Squier-class transport ship for the U.S. Navy in World War II. She was named in honor of U.S. Army general Richard M. Blatchford. She was transferred to the U.S. Army as USAT General R. M. Blatchford in 1946. On 1 March 1950 she was transferred to the Military Sea Transportation Service (MSTS) as USNS General R. M. Blatchford (T-AP-153). She was later sold for commercial operation under the names SS Stonewall Jackson and Alex Stephens, before being scrapped in 1980.

== Operational history ==
General R. M. Blatchford (AP-153) was launched 27 August 1944 under a Maritime Commission contract (MC #705) by the Kaiser Co., Richmond, California; sponsored by Mrs. William Anderson of San Francisco; acquired and simultaneously commissioned 26 January 1945.

General R. M. Blatchford sailed from San Francisco 12 March 1945 with over 3000 fighting men and debarked them at Manila 13 April, returning to San Francisco 22 May to off-load 2000 troops taken on board at Biak and Finschhafen. She sailed 30 May for France via the Panama Canal, touched at Le Havre 20 June, and debarked more than 3,000 returning troops at Boston 1 July. Five days later the transport sailed to redeploy troops from the European to the Pacific theater, embarking 3000 soldiers at Leghorn, Italy, and bringing them safely to Luzon and Manila in August 1945. General R. M. Blatchford embarked more than 1,000 troops and casualties at San Pedro, Philippine Islands, and put in at Seattle 30 September 1945.

Continuing her Magic Carpet assignments, the ship sailed from Seattle 16 October with 2,800 rotation troops and debarked them at Nagoya, Japan, where 3,000 homeward veterans were loaded and put ashore at San Francisco 20 November. From 28 November 1945 – 7 May 1946 three more round trip voyages from Seattle to the Far East were made, the transport bringing near-capacity loads of troops to and from Nagoya, Yokohama, and Shanghai and mooring at San Francisco 7 May 1946 with completion of these duties.

On 9 May General R. M. Blatchford departed for Norfolk, via the Panama Canal and moored at that port 24 May. She was decommissioned at Baltimore, Maryland, on 12 June 1946 and returned to the Maritime Commission for operations as an Army transport.

On 28 June 1949, USAT General R. M. Blatchford left Bremerhaven, Germany with Displaced Persons, arriving in Boston, MA, on 7 July 1949.

On 16 October 1949 USAT General R. M. Blatchford left Naples with 1,219 displaced persons from Europe and arrived in Sydney on 11 November 1949. This voyage was one of almost 150 voyages by some 40 ships bringing refugees of World War II to Australia. General R. M. Blatchford made another trip, arriving in Sydney, with 1,222 refugees on 19 February 1950.

She was reacquired by the Navy on 1 March 1950 for operation by a Civil Service crew under the Military Sea Transportation Service (MSTS). General R. M. Blatchford then transported thousands of troops from the West Coast in support of United Nations forces in Korea.

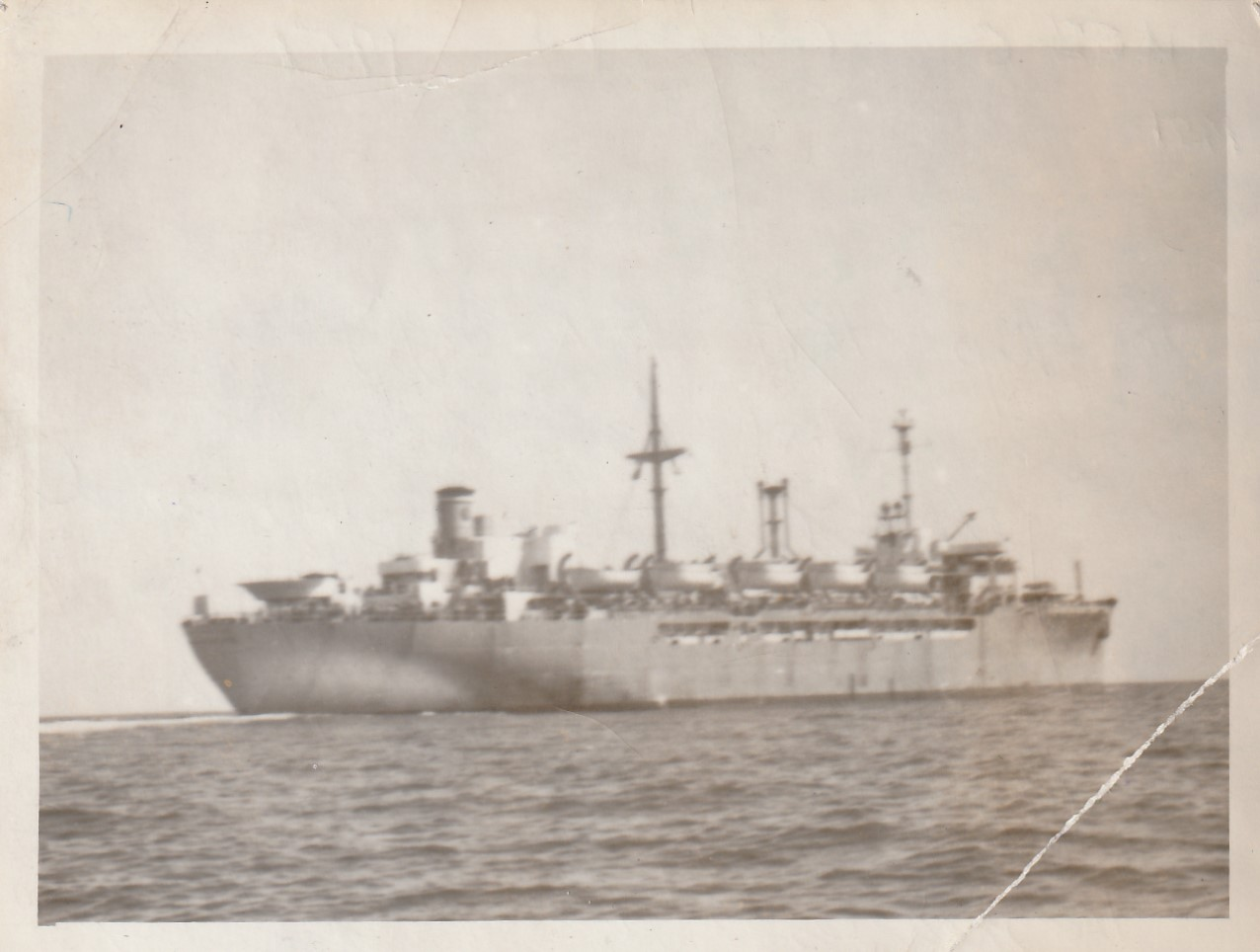
1951 photo of the R.M.BLATCHFORD as a civilian carrier

The USNS R.M. Blatchford (T-AP153) made at least two more trips carrying refugees; she sailed from Bremerhaven, Germany across the Atlantic Ocean with refugees from Germany, Poland, Russia, Czechoslovakia, Yugoslavia and other countries and arrived at the Port of New York on 31 January, 23 June, 25 September 1951. On 20 October 1951, the ship arrived at Commonwealth Pier in Boston with 1,222 displaced persons from Europe after being diverted from New York because of a dock strike. Special trains carried the passengers onward to New York, Washington, Chicago, Buffalo, Cleveland, and Detroit. The ship also arrived in New York on 15 December 1951. She made another trip carrying refugees from Bremerhaven, Germany, to the Port of New Orleans, arriving there in mid-March 1952. A Manifest of Inbound Passengers (Aliens) records that the ship departed Bremerhaven, Germany, on 11 April 1952 and arrived in New York on 22 April 1952 carrying refugees. On 11 February 1961 she sailed from New York for two and a half years overseas service in the United Nations Congo sealift. Earning her the nickname of "Ambassador Ship," her crew cemented goodwill relations for the United States in the best traditions of the People-to-People Program while helping to keep the peace in the Congo. The veteran transport travelled 174,000 nautical miles (322,000 km) in ferrying 36,809 passengers to and from the Congo, Morocco, India, Pakistan, Malaya, and Indonesia. She circumnavigated the African continent several times and criss-crossed the Indian Ocean repeatedly while rotating United Nations soldiers, doctors, nurses, and technicians assigned to the Congo. General R. M. Blatchford arrived New York on 11 August 1963 with high praise.

The ship and her devoted master and crew have been a mainstay of the United Nations Operations in the Congo, and they have never failed us, even when their duties must have seemed arduous and incessant.

— United Nations Secretary-General U Thant

In the Fall of 1964 the Blatchford sailed from Morehead City, NC to Rota, Spain fully laden with Marines from the 2nd Marine Air Wing (home based at MCAS Cherry Point). The deployment was part of the largest amphibious operation since World War II, a combined forces NATO war exercise code-named Operation Steel Pike. The return was via the Canary Islands for liberty. During the return crossing of the Atlantic the ship passed through the final track of four former hurricanes. The seas became so rough that the troops were confined below decks and life boat drills were simulated in place. A fire broke out in a bow compartment at approximately 08:00 on the final day of the storm. The alarm added to the adventure and the fire was quickly extinguished by the Damage Control Party.

She continued to operate in the Atlantic supporting U.S. Forces in Europe until transferred to the Pacific in 1965 to carry troops to South Vietnam. She continued this vital task until overhauled at San Francisco in January 1967 and entering ready reserve status. General R. M. Blatchford was transferred to the Maritime Administration in September 1968 and entered the National Defense Reserve Fleet.

In 1969, General R. M. Blatchford was sold to Waterman Carriers, Inc. of New York in January 1969. In 1970 she was rebuilt as a 10,562 gross ton breakbulk freighter and renamed SS Stonewall Jackson, USCG ON 524489, IMO 6121113. The ship, renamed Alex Stephens in 1973, was acquired by the Department of Commerce in 1979, and sold to Chien Yu Steel Enterprises, Kaohsiung, Taiwan for scrapping on 13 April 1980.

General R. M. Blatchford received two battle stars for service during the Korean War.

== Sources ==
- Williams, Greg H. (2013). World War II U.S. Navy Vessels in Private Hands. McFarland Books. ISBN 978-0-7864-6645-0.
