= USS General T. H. Bliss =

US Navy transport ship from WW2

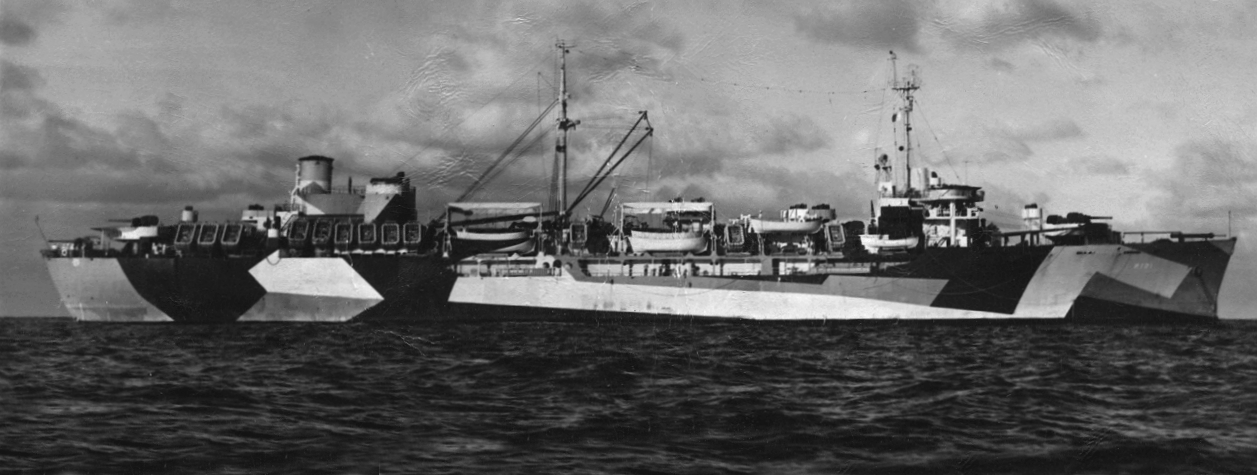
- USS General T. H. Bliss circa 1943

History

United States
- Name: General T. H. Bliss
- Namesake: Tasker Howard Bliss
- Builder: Kaiser Co., Inc.; Richmond, California
- Laid down: 22 May 1942
- Launched: 19 December 1942
- Acquired: 3 November 1943
- Commissioned: 24 February 1944
- Decommissioned: 28 June 1946
- Renamed: SS Seamar, April 1964
- Identification: IMO number: 6413778
- Fate: Scrapped 1979

General characteristics
- Class & type: General G. O. Squier-class transport ship
- Displacement: 9,950 tons (light), 17,250 tons (full)
- Length: 522 ft 10 in (159.36 m)
- Beam: 71 ft 6 in (21.79 m)
- Draft: 26 ft 6 in (8.08 m)
- Propulsion: single-screw steam turbine with 9,900 shp (7,400 kW)
- Speed: 17 knots (31 km/h)
- Capacity: 3,522 troops
- Complement: 356 (officers and enlisted)
- Armament: 4 × 5"/38 caliber guns; 8 × 1.1"/75 AA guns; 16 × 20 mm Oerlikon AA guns

USS General T. H. Bliss (AP-131) was a General G. O. Squier-class transport ship for the U.S. Navy in World War II. She was named in honor of U.S. Army general Tasker Howard Bliss. Decommissioned in 1946, she was sold privately in 1964 and renamed SS Seamar, and was scrapped in 1979.

== Operational history ==
General T. H. Bliss was laid down under a Maritime Commission contract 22 May 1942 by Kaiser Co., Inc., Yard 3, Richmond, California; launched 19 December 1942; sponsored by Mrs. Eleanora Bliss Knopf; acquired by the Navy 3 November 1943; and commissioned 24 February 1944.

After shakedown, General T. H. Bliss embarked more than 3,600 sailors and marines, sailed from San Francisco 27 March 1944 for New Caledonia, and subsequently returned to San Francisco 1 May with veterans embarked at Efate and Espiritu Santo. Underway again 10 May, she carried 3,500 soldiers to Oro Bay, New Guinea, before sailing via the Panama Canal to New York, where she put in 4 July with over 2,000 men and patients embarked at Balboa.

From 28 July 1944 to 4 September 1945, General T. H. Bliss made 11, round-trip transatlantic, troop-carrying voyages (2 from Newport, 3 from Boston, and 6 from New York) to ports in the United Kingdom (Avonmouth, Plymouth, and Southampton); France (Marseilles and Le Havre); Italy (Naples); and North Africa (Oran). She sailed from Boston 11 September 1945 for Karachi, India, on her first "Magic-Carpet" voyage and returned to New York 23 October carrying veterans of the Pacific fighting. Following a similar voyage from New York to Calcutta and back during November and December, she made a round-the-world voyage from New York eastward to Calcutta and thence via Guam to San Francisco, where she arrived 15 March 1946. Departing San Francisco 5 April, she carried occupation troops to Yokohama, Japan; then steamed back to the United States, arriving Seattle 6 May.

General T. H. Bliss decommissioned at Seattle 28 June, was returned to the WSA 2 July, and was placed in the National Defense Reserve Fleet at Olympia, Washington.

She was sold to Bethlehem Steel Wilmington (aka Harlan and Hollingsworth) of Wilmington, Delaware in April 1964, rebuilt as a general cargo ship for Bethlehem's subsidiary Calmar Line, and renamed Seamar, USCG ON 294729, IMO 6413778. The ship was renamed Coroni in 1975 and scrapped in 1979.

== See also ==
- USS Tasker H. Bliss (AP-42), a World War II transport ship sunk 13 November 1942 by U-130 off the coast of Morocco.

== Sources ==
- Williams, Greg H. (2013). World War II U.S. Navy Vessels in Private Hands. McFarland Books. ISBN 978-0-7864-6645-0.
