= SS Portmar =

A number of ships have been named SS Portmar.

- SS Portmar (1919), a United States Shipping Board 5,551 GRT freighter ordered as West Minsi completed privately as Centaurus, renamed 1930 Portmar, later U.S. Army Transport Portmar bombed, beached and refloated at Darwin, Australia on 19 February 1942, torpedoed and lost 16 June 1943.
- USS General Omar Bundy (AP-152) was renamed Portmar on 10 April 1964 after conversion to commercial service.
- SS Joseph B. Eastman, a 1944 Liberty ship renamed Portmar in 1947.
