= Chicago piano =

Chicago piano was a nickname for two World War 2 anti-aircraft weapons:

- 1.1-inch/75-caliber gun
- QF 2-pounder naval gun Mark VIII
