= George Owen Squier =

United States Army general and inventor

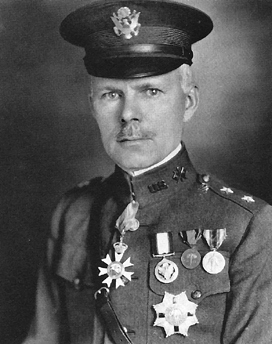
- Major General George Owen Squier
- Born: March 21, 1865; Dryden, Michigan, U.S.
- Died: March 24, 1934 (aged 69); Washington, D.C., U.S.
- Burial place: Arlington National Cemetery
- Military career
- Allegiance: United States of America
- Branch: United States Army
- Service years: 1887–1923
- Rank: Major general
- Commands: Chief Signal Officer
- Conflicts: Spanish–American War; World War I
- Awards: Distinguished Service Medal; Honorary Knight Commander of the Order of St Michael and St George; Order of the Crown of Italy; Legion of Honor; Elliott Cresson Medal; John Scott Medal; Franklin Medal
- Other work: businessman, scientist

George Owen Squier (March 21, 1865 – March 24, 1934) was an American general, scientist, and inventor best known for inventing and popularizing what today is called Muzak.

== Life and military career ==
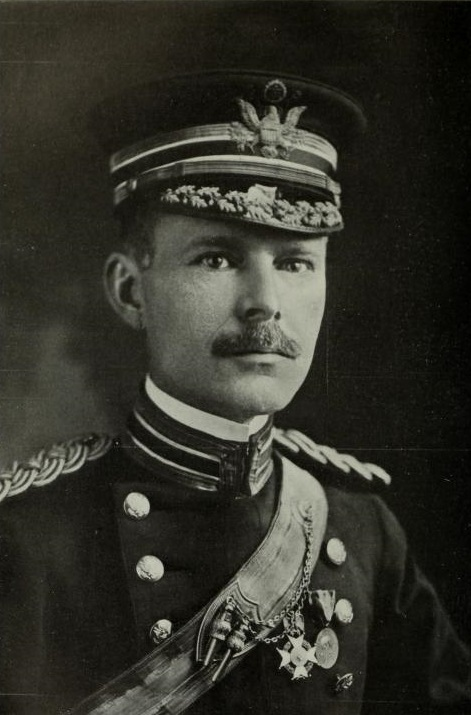
Portrait of Squier, by Harris & Ewing, c. 1911

Squier was born in Dryden, Michigan. He graduated seventh in a class of 64 from the United States Military Academy in the Class of 1887. Among his classmates who also became general officers were Frank Herman Albright, Marcus Daniel Cronin, Alexander Lucian Dade, James Theodore Dean, Charles S. Farnsworth, George Washington Gatchell, Charles Gerhardt, Herman Hall, Thomas Grafton Hanson, Mark L. Hersey, Ernest Hinds, Michael Joseph Lenihan, Ulysses G. McAlexander, Nathaniel Fish McClure, William C. Rivers, Charles Brewster Wheeler, and Edmund Wittenmyer.

In 1893, Squier received a Ph.D. from Johns Hopkins University. He wrote and edited many books and articles on the subject of radio and electricity. An inventor, he and Dartmouth professor Albert Cushing Crehore developed a magneto-optical streak camera "The Polarizing Photo-chronograph" in 1896 to measure the speed of projectiles both inside a cannon and directly after they left the cannon barrel. This was one of the earliest photonic programs. They also worked to develop synchronous AC telegraphic systems. His biggest contribution was that of telephone carrier multiplexing in 1910 for which he was elected to the National Academy of Sciences in 1919. He was also an elected member of the American Philosophical Society.

In 1897, Squier, "...made a huge Marconi transmitter operated by a Tesla coil, which is a powerful one. There is no trouble in ringing bells, lighting lamps, firing cannon or explosives or starting machinery at considerable distances through the air by Hertzian waves."

In September 1900 Squier sailed from New York for Manila on the cable ship USAT Burnside. He was in command of a 25-man Signal Corps detachment that laid the first American telegraph cables in the Philippines.

As executive officer to the Chief Signal Officer, U.S. Signal Corps in 1907, Squier was instrumental in the establishment of the Aeronautical Division, U.S. Signal Corps, the first organizational ancestor of the U.S. Air Force. He also was the first military passenger in an airplane on September 12, 1908, and, working with the Wright Brothers, was responsible for the purchase of the first airplanes by the US Army in 1909.

From May 1916 to February 1917, he was Chief of the Aviation Section, U.S. Signal Corps, the first successor of the Aeronautical Division, before being promoted to major general and appointed Chief Signal Officer during World War I.

In 1922, he created Wired Radio, a service which piped music to businesses and subscribers over wires. In 1934, he changed the service's name to 'Muzak'.

Asked how to say his name, he told The Literary Digest it was pronounced like the word square.

He was a member of the Sons of the American Revolution.

== Death ==
He died in Washington, D.C., at George Washington Hospital on March 24, 1934 of pneumonia, and was buried in Arlington National Cemetery.

== Awards ==
- Distinguished Service Medal
- Spanish War Service Medal
- Philippine Campaign Medal
- World War I Victory Medal
- Honorary Knight Commander of the Order of St Michael and St George
- Commander of the Legion of Honor (France)
- Commander of the Order of the Crown of Italy

== Dates of rank ==
No Insignia	Cadet, United States Military Academy: 1 July 1883
No Insignia in 1886	Second Lieutenant, Regular Army: 12 June 1887
	First Lieutenant, Regular Army: 30 June 1893
	Captain, Volunteer Army: 1 June 1898 (Date of rank was 20 May 1898.)
	Lieutenant Colonel, Volunteer Army: 20 July 1898
	First Lieutenant, Regular Army: 7 December 1898 (Reverted to permanent rank.)
	Captain, Volunteer Army: 17 April 1899
	Captain, Regular Army: 1 July 1901 (Date of rank was 2 February 1901.)
	Major, Regular Army: 2 March 1903
	Lieutenant Colonel, Regular Army: 17 March 1913
	Brigadier General, Temporary: 14 February 1917
	Colonel, Regular Army: 12 April 1917
	Major General, Temporary: 8 October 1917
	Colonel, Regular Army: 14 February 1921 (Reverted to permanent rank.)
	Major General, Temporary: 28 March 1921 (Date of rank was 6 October 1917.)
	Major General, Retired list: 31 December 1923

== Legacy ==
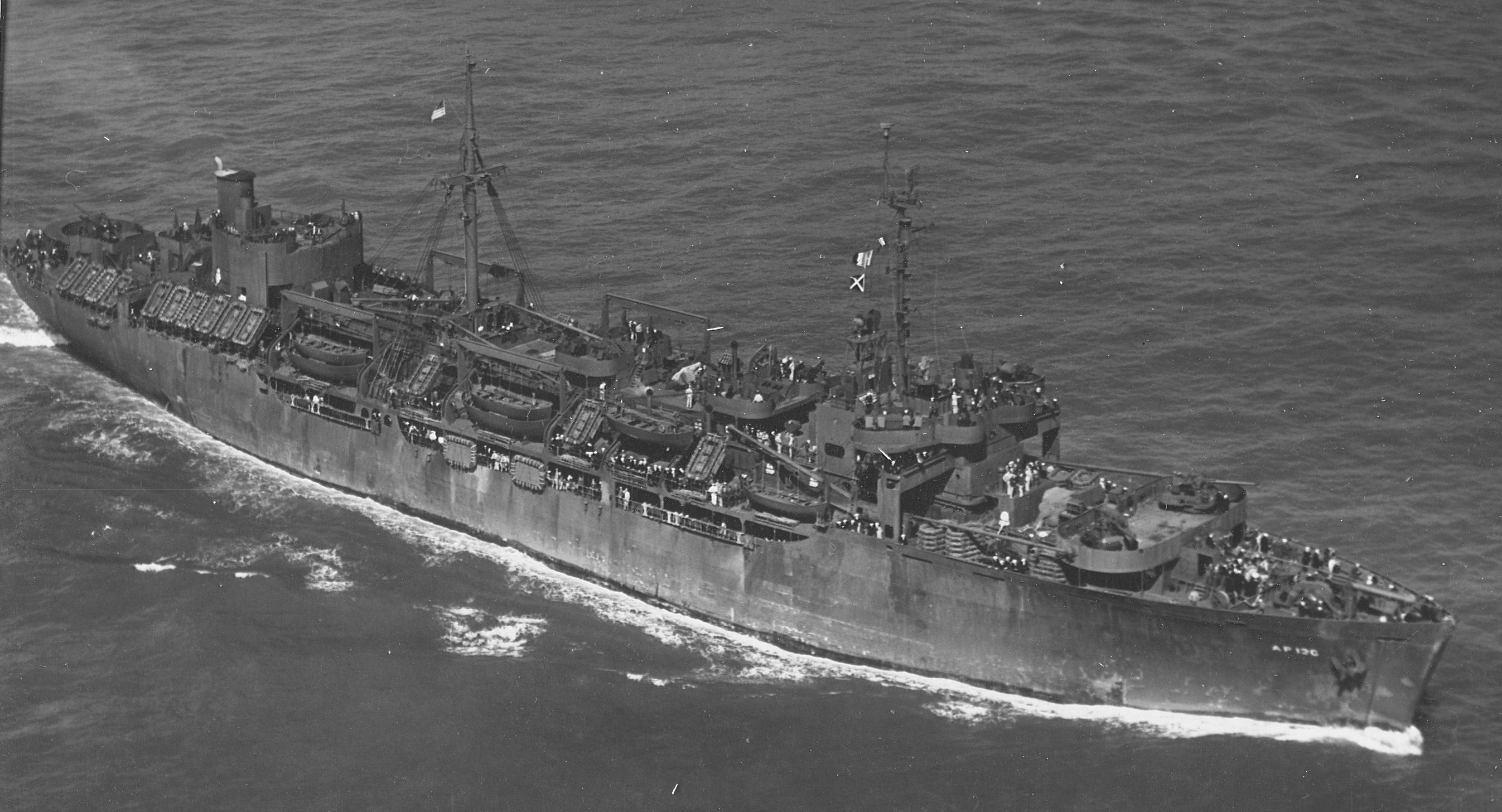
USS General G.O. Squier (AP-130)

In 1943, the U.S. Navy named troopship USS General G. O. Squier (AP-130) in his honor. It was the lead ship of its class, which was known as General G. O. Squier class of transport ships.

General Squier Park, a historic district and waterpark in his hometown of Dryden, Michigan, is named in his honor.

== Publications ==
- Crehore, Albert Cushing; George Owen Squier (1897). The Polarizing Photo-Chronograph. London: John Wiley & Sons.
- — (1908). "The Present Status of Military Aeronautics". Annual Report of the Board of Regents of the Smithsonian Institution: 117.
- — (1919). Multiplex Telephony And Telegraphy By Means Of Electric Waves Guided By Wires. Washington: Government Printing Office.
