= USS General Omar Bundy =

U.S. Navy transport ship in WWII

General Omar Bundy
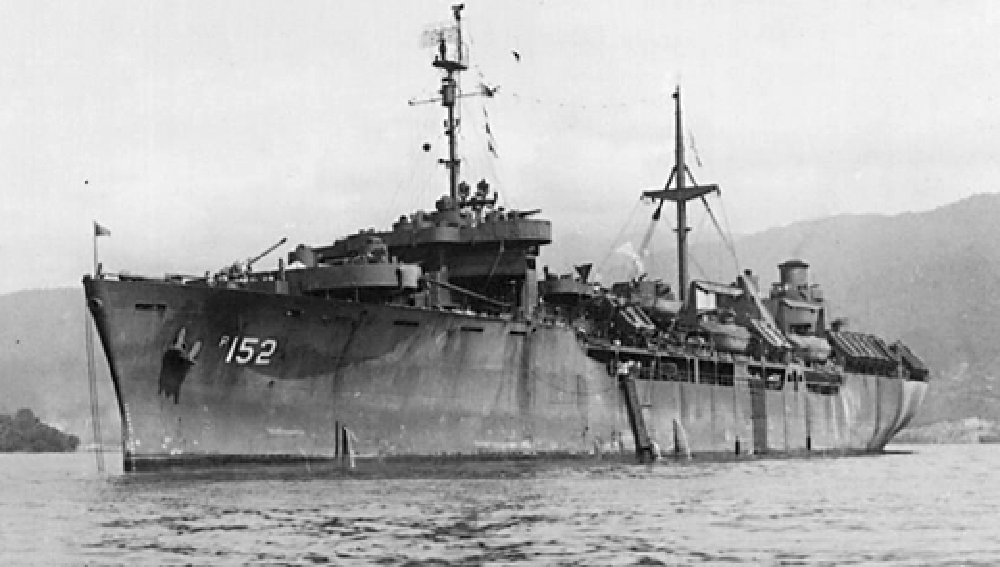
- USS General Omar Bundy

History

United States
- Name: General Omar Bundy
- Namesake: Omar Bundy
- Builder: Kaiser Co., Inc.; Richmond, California
- Laid down: date 1944
- Launched: 5 August 1944
- Acquired: 6 January 1945
- Commissioned: 6 January 1945
- Decommissioned: 14 June 1946
- In service: after 30 August 1946 (U.S. Army)
- Out of service: 12 December 1949 (U.S. Army)
- Renamed: SS Portmar, 10 April 1964; SS Port, 10 August 1976; SS Poet, 11 May 1979
- Stricken: 8 October 1946
- Identification: IMO number: 5127956
- Fate: missing, presumed sunk, 1980

General characteristics
- Class & type: General G. O. Squier-class transport ship
- Displacement: 9,950 tons (light), 17,250 tons (full)
- Length: 522 ft 10 in (159.36 m)
- Beam: 71 ft 6 in (21.79 m)
- Draft: 26 ft 6 in (8.08 m)
- Propulsion: single-screw steam turbine with 9,900 shp (7,400 kW)
- Speed: 17 knots (31 km/h)
- Capacity: 3,823 troops
- Complement: 356 (officers and enlisted)
- Armament: 4 × 5"/38 caliber gun mounts; 4 × 40 mm AA gun mounts; 16 × 20 mm AA gun mounts

USS General Omar Bundy (AP-152) was a General G. O. Squier-class transport ship for the U.S. Navy in World War II.

She was transferred to the U.S. Army as USAT General Omar Bundy in 1946, named in honor of U.S. Army major general Omar Bundy.

She was later sold for commercial operation under several names, including SS Poet, before being declared missing in 1980 and presumed sunk.

== Operational history ==
General Omar Bundy (AP-152) was launched 5 August 1944 under a Maritime Commission contract (MC #704) by the Kaiser Co., Richmond, California; sponsored by Mrs. Lawrence Wainwright of Richmond; acquired and simultaneously commissioned 6 January 1945.

Many years later, in 1980, after being converted to a bulk carrier and renamed the SS Poet, the ship disappeared off the coast of Delaware with all hands and sparked a discussion of maritime safety inspections and the wisdom of keeping very old American ships at sea.

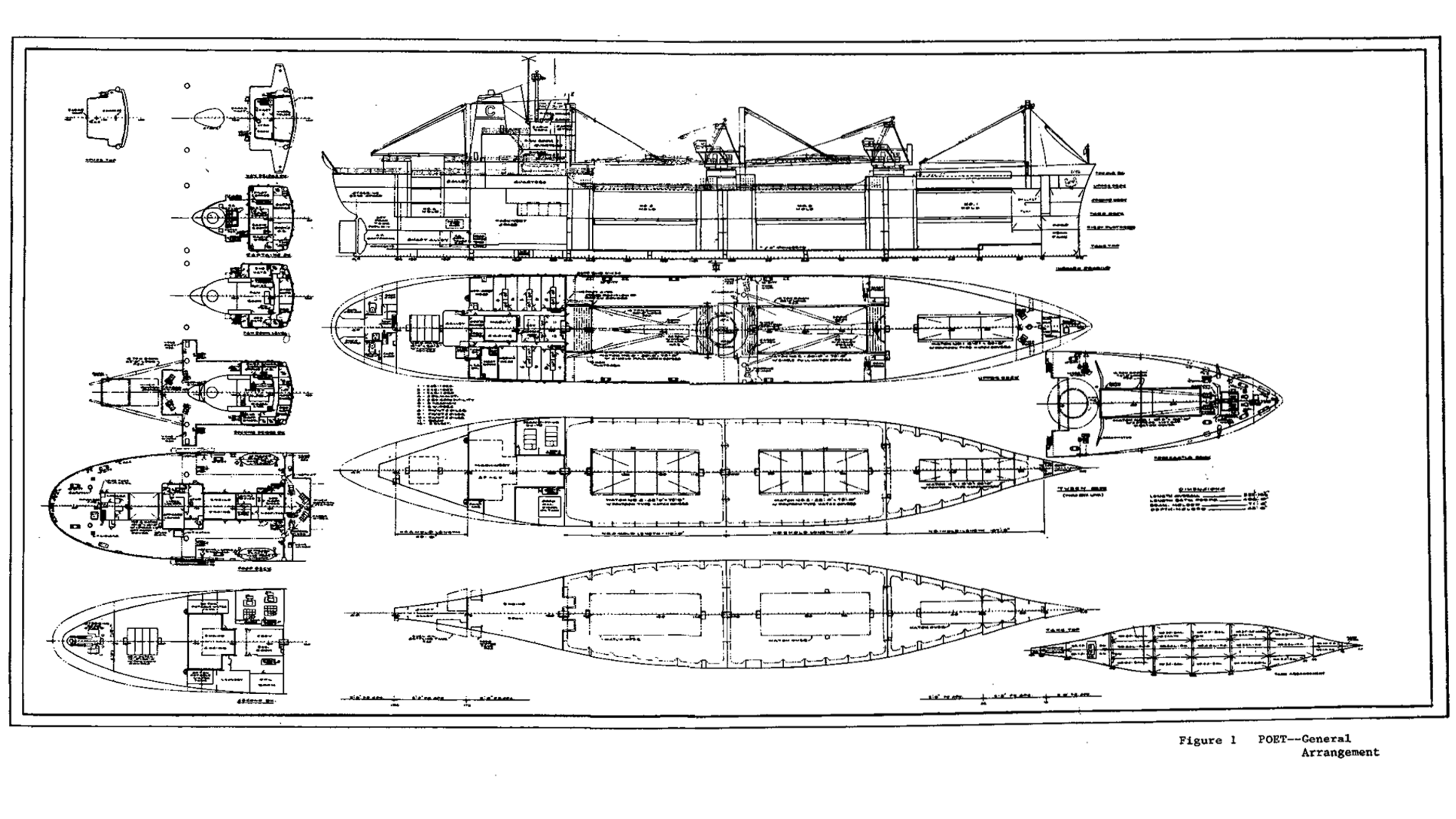
Schematics of the SS Poet from the United States Coast Guard

General Omar Bundy stood out of San Francisco Bay 10 March 1945 with 2,700 sailors and marines bound for the Southwest Pacific, and after delivering them to Pearl Harbor, Ulithi, and Guam, returned to San Diego 11 May with over 1,700 homeward-bound troops after debarking 200 Japanese POW's at Pearl Harbor on 3 May. Six days later she sailed for the Atlantic via the Panama Canal and put in at Norfolk, 31 May. Underway again on 9 June, she touched Marseille to embark 2,800 troops for redeployment to the Pacific theater and brought them safely to Manila on 6 August 1945 via Panama. She brought nearly 500 officers and men from Manila to Tacloban, Leyte, Philippine Islands, and after embarking 1,500 veterans there, sailed via Ulithi and Guam to off-load her passengers at Seattle, Washington, on 4 September. Continuing her Magic Carpet duties, General Omar Bundy transported 3,000 replacement troops from Seattle to Okinawa in late September and October, returning to Portland, Oregon, on 2 November 1945 with nearly 3,000 victorious soldiers. The ship returned to the Philippines in November to embark 3,300 returning veterans, and brought them home to San Francisco on 19 December 1945.

In 1946 General Omar Bundy continued her "Magic-Carpet" and troop rotation duties, homeported at San Francisco and calling at Japan and Manila in February and at the Philippines again in April, returning to San Francisco after this last round-trip voyage and sailed from that port 17 May 1946 bound for New York via the Panama Canal. She was decommissioned 14 June 1946 and was delivered to the Maritime Commission the next day. General Omar Bundy was struck from the Navy list on 8 October 1946.

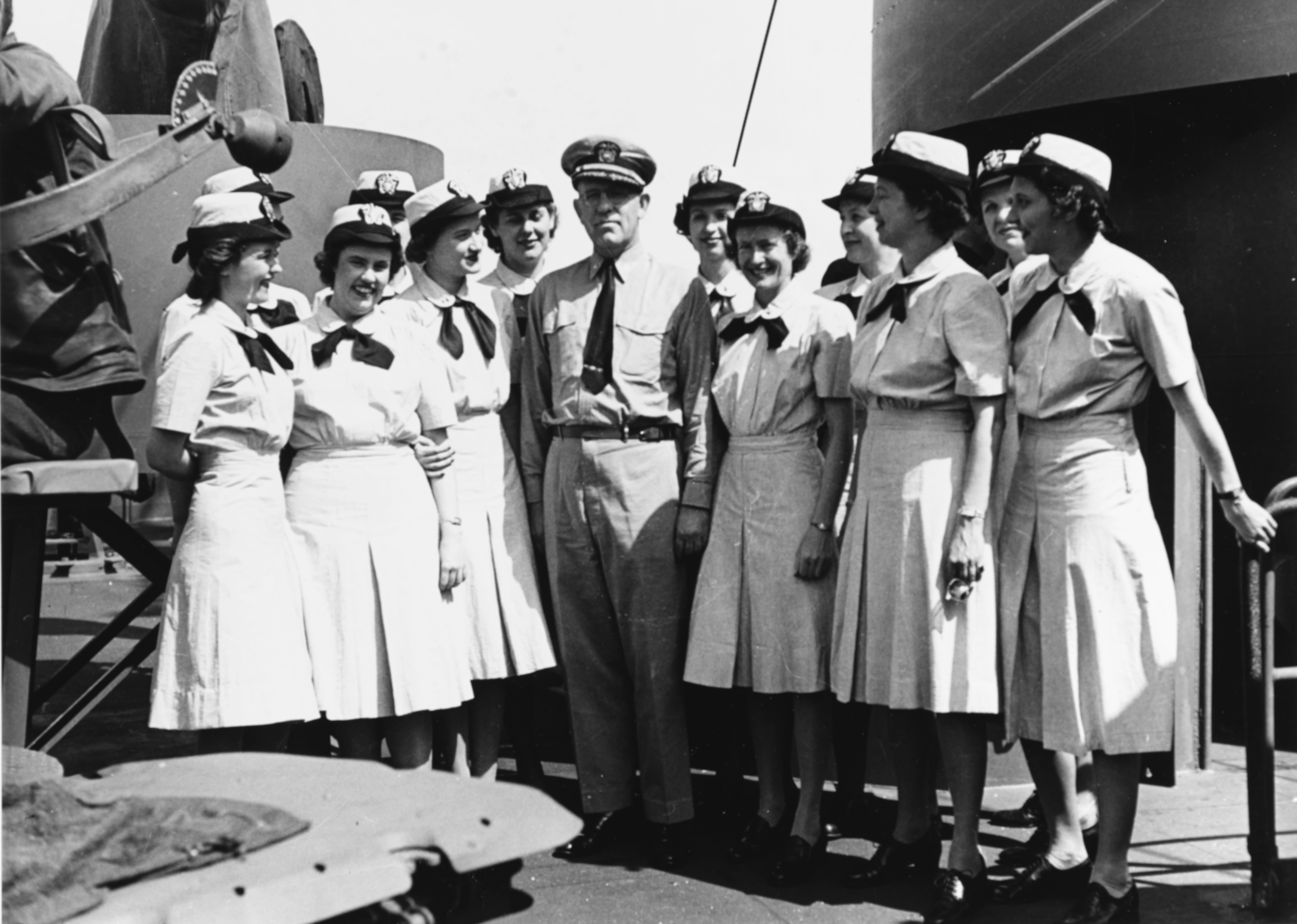
Officers pose on the navigation bridge of USS General Omar Bundy. Captain Lawrence Wainwright, (Center) En route to Pearl Harbor, Hawaii.

The transport was transferred to the War Department on 30 August 1946, and carried troops for the Army until returned to the Maritime Commission 12 December 1949.

On 11 June 1949 USAT General Omar Bundy left Naples with 842 displaced persons from Europe and arrived in Sydney on 8 July 1949. This voyage was one of almost 150 voyages by some 40 ships bringing refugees of World War II to Australia. General Omar Bundy made one more such trip herself, arriving in Sydney, again, with 842 refugees on 8 July 1949.

The ship was returned to the Maritime Commission on 12 December 1949. General Omar Bundy entered the National Defense Reserve Fleet and was berthed in the James River until delivered to the Bethlehem Steel Corp. 10 April 1964. Converted to a general cargo ship, she operated under the name Portmar, USCG ON 294731, IMO 5127956, for Bethlehem's subsidiary Calmar Line. She was sold to Ashley Steamship Co., Inc. on 10 August 1976 and renamed SS Port. Port was sold to Hawaiian Eugenia Corp. on 11 May 1979 and renamed SS Poet.

On 24 October 1980, Poet left Philadelphia for Port Said, Egypt, with a crew of 34. It was supposed to arrive 9 November, but never did so. Poet was presumed sunk. A series of articles in The Philadelphia Inquirer by maritime writer Robert R. Frump stated that SS Poet and other World War II vessels, were kept in service long past their useful lifetimes by U.S. government programs such as the PL 480 Food for Peace, which required that American-built vessels carry surplus American grain to poor nations abroad. The articles about the Poet and later, the sinking of the SS Marine Electric, helped bring about stricter enforcement of maritime laws. The system that kept the old ships at sea was described in Frump's book, Until the Sea Shall Free Them.

== Sources ==
- "General Omar Bundy". United States Navy.
- Williams, Greg H. (2013). World War II U.S. Navy Vessels in Private Hands. McFarland Books. ISBN 978-0-7864-6645-0.
