= General G. O. Squier-class transport =

Class of transport ship

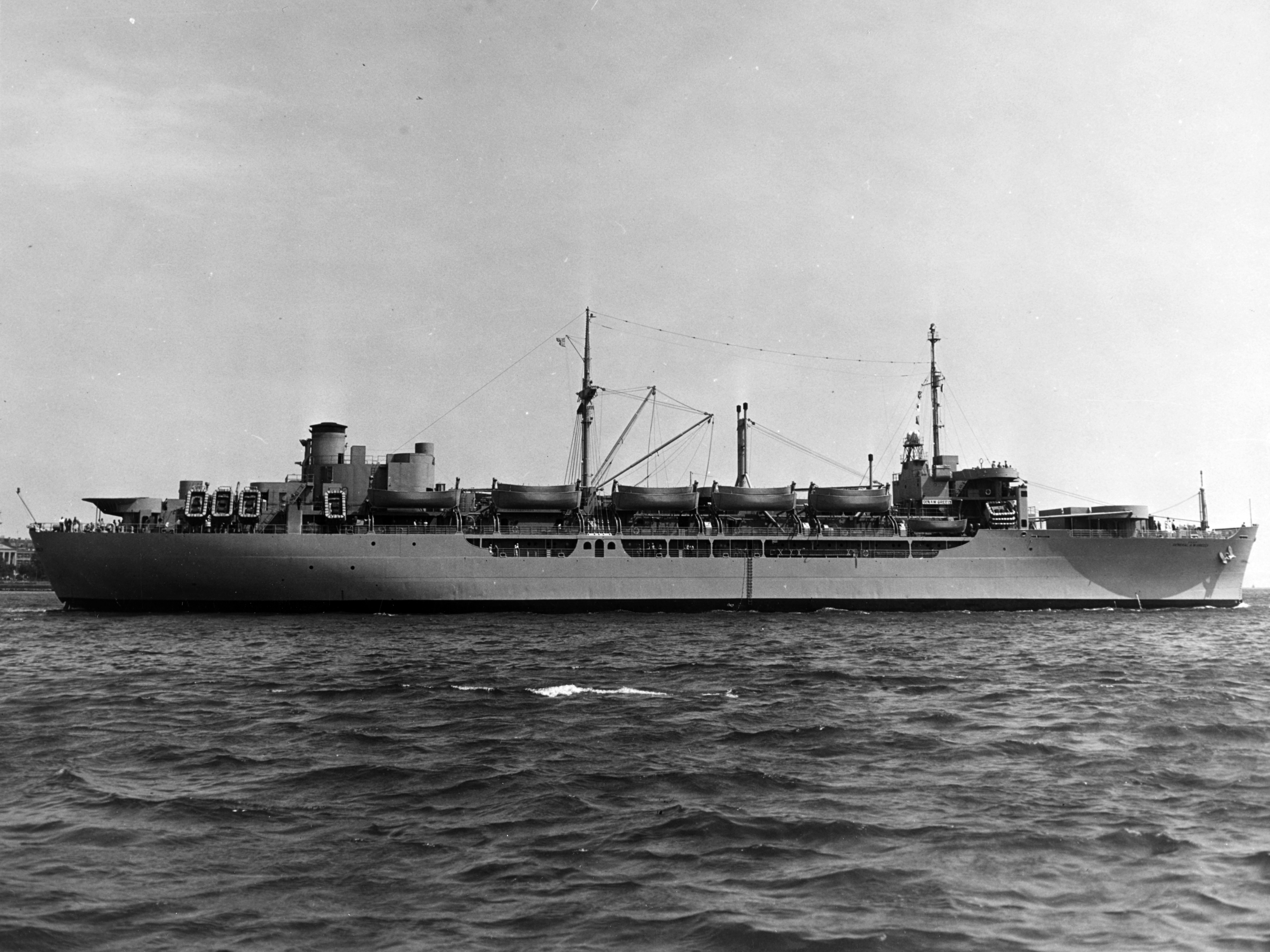
- Squier-class USNS General A.W. Greely (T-AP-141) in the early 1950s

Class overview
- Name: General G. O. Squier-class transport
- Builders: Kaiser Co., Inc.
- Operators: United States Navy; United States Army; United States Air Force
- Built: 1942-1945
- In commission: 1943-1983
- Completed: 30
- Retired: 30
- Preserved: None were preserved

General characteristics
- Type: C4-S-A1 Transport ship
- Displacement: 9,950 tons (light), 17,250 tons (full)
- Length: 522 ft 10 in (159.36 m)
- Beam: 71 ft 6 in (21.79 m)
- Draft: 26 ft 6 in (8.08 m)
- Propulsion: single-screw steam turbine with 9,900 shp (7,400 kW)
- Speed: 17 knots (31 km/h; 20 mph)
- Capacity: 3,823 troops
- Complement: 356 (officers and enlisted)
- Armament: 4 × 5"/38 caliber gun mounts; 4 × 40 mm AA gun mounts; 16 × 20 mm AA gun mounts

The General G. O. Squier class of transport ships was built for the U.S. Navy during World War II. The class was based upon the Maritime Commission's Type C4 ship. The class was named for United States Army Major General George Owen Squier.

The first ship was launched in November 1942, while the last was launched in April 1945. Over that period the United States produced 30 General G. O. Squier-class transports. All of the ships were initially designated with hull classification symbol "AP" and numbered from 130 through 159. All but the four ships of the class (130, 131, 132, and 136) were transferred to the U.S. Army Transportation Service in 1946 and served as United States Army Transports (USAT), several of them being refitted to a larger gross tonnage. The 24 (numbers 134, 135, 137–151, and 153–159) still in service in 1950 were transferred back to the Navy as part of the Military Sea Transportation Service (MSTS). All but two were transferred on 1 March 1950, and all were reinstated on the Naval Vessel Register as United States Naval Ships (USNS), and redesignated with hull classification symbol "T-AP".

Most of the General G. O. Squier class were deactivated in 1958 for two reasons: the introduction of jet airliners, and a decision to use berthing space on U.S.-flagged passenger ships. Two ships, however, General LeRoy Eltinge and General R. M. Blatchford, assisted in United Nations efforts in the Congo Republic in the early 1960s, and both were pressed into service transporting troops to Vietnam in the mid-1960s.

Two other ships of the General G. O. Squier class, General Harry Taylor and General R. E. Callan were transferred to the U.S. Air Force as missile tracking ships as part of the Missile Test Project, and renamed USAFS General Hoyt S. Vandenberg and USAFS General H. H. Arnold, respectively. They were later transferred back to MSTS under their new names and redesignated with hull classification symbol "T-AGM".

The last General G. O. Squier-class ship afloat, the ex-General Hoyt S. Vandenberg, was sunk as an artificial reef off of the Florida Keys on 27 May 2009.

== General characteristics ==
- Displacement: 9,950 tons (light), 17,250 tons (full)
- Length: 522 ft 10 in (159.36 m)
- Beam: 71 ft 6 in (21.79 m)
- Draft:
  - 24 ft (7.32 m) (AP 130, 134, 137, 140, 142–149, 151, 154–158)
  - 26 ft 6 in (8.08 m) (AP 131–133, 135–136, 138–139, 141, 150, 152–153, 159)
- Complement: 356 (officers and enlisted)
  - 425 (AP 136, 150)
  - 426 (AP 133)
  - 449 (AP 139)
  - 471 (AP 132)
  - 494 (AP 138)
  - 512 (AP 135)
- Troop capacity:
  - 2,173 troops (AP 147)
  - 3,343 troops (AP 133, 137, 149–151)
  - 3,444 troops (AP 132)
  - 3,522 troops (AP 131)
  - 3,530 troops (AP 134)
  - 3,595 troops (AP 140)
  - 3,823 troops (AP 130, 135–136, 139, 141–144, 148, 152–159)
  - 4,766 troops (AP 138)
  - 6,086 troops (AP 146)
- Armament
  - AP 130–133, 145, 149:

4 × 5"/38 caliber guns
8 × 1.1"/75 AA guns
16 × 20 mm Oerlikon AA guns

  - AP 141, 154–159:

4 × 5"/38 caliber gun mounts
4 × 40 mm AA gun mounts
16 × 20 mm AA gun mounts

- Speed: 17 knots (31 km/h)
- Propulsion: single-screw steam turbine with 9,900 shp (7,400 kW)

== General G. O. Squier-class ships ==
- USS General G. O. Squier (AP-130)
- USS General T. H. Bliss (AP-131)
- USS General J. R. Brooke (AP-132)
- USS General O. H. Ernst (AP-133)
- USS General R. L. Howze (AP-134)
- USS General W. M. Black (AP-135), later USS Green Forest, Central Gulf Lines. MSC charter 1974.
- USS General H. L. Scott (AP-136)
- USS General S. D. Sturgis (AP-137)
- USS General C. G. Morton (AP-138)
- USS General R. E. Callan (AP-139), later USNS General H. H. Arnold (T-AGM-9)
- USS General M. B. Stewart (AP-140)
- USS General A. W. Greely (AP-141)
- USS General C. H. Muir (AP-142)
- USS General H. B. Freeman (AP-143)
- USS General H. F. Hodges (AP-144)
- USS General Harry Taylor (AP-145), later USNS General Hoyt S. Vandenberg (T-AGM-10)
- USS General W. F. Hase (AP-146)
- USS General E. T. Collins (AP-147)
- USS General M. L. Hersey (AP-148)
- USS General J. H. McRae (AP-149)
- USS General M. M. Patrick (AP-150)
- USS General W. C. Langfitt (AP-151)
- USS General Omar Bundy (AP-152)
- USS General R. M. Blatchford (AP-153)
- USS General LeRoy Eltinge (AP-154)
- USS General A. W. Brewster (AP-155)
- USS General D. E. Aultman (AP-156)
- USS General C. C. Ballou (AP-157)
- USS General W. G. Haan (AP-158)
- USS General Stuart Heintzelman (AP-159)

== See also ==
- Type C4 class ship
- Haven-class hospital ship of the U.S. Navy were also based on the Type C4 hull design.
