= Dwight Edward Aultman =

United States Army general

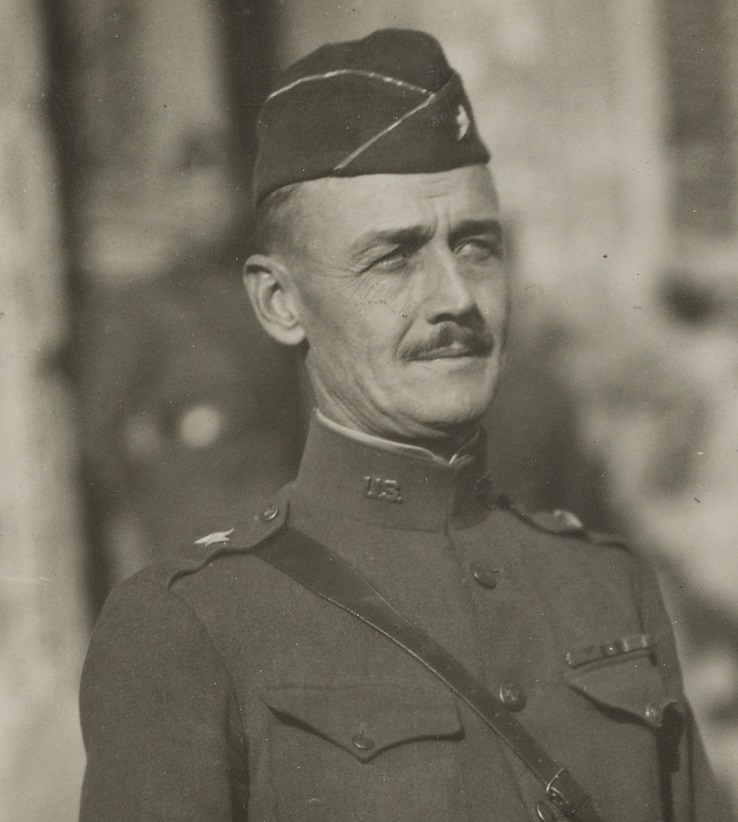
- Brigadier General Aultman in Nouart 1918
- Born: February 2, 1872; Allegheny, Pennsylvania, US
- Died: December 12, 1929 (aged 57)
- Burial place: Arlington National Cemetery
- Spouse: Alma H.
- Military career
- Allegiance: United States
- Branch: United States Army
- Service years: 1894–1921
- Rank: Brigadier general
- Service number: 0-81
- Unit: Cavalry Branch
- Commands: 5th Field Artillery Brigade
- Conflicts: Spanish–American War; World War I
- Awards: Army Distinguished Service Medal; Silver Star; Croix de Guerre; Commandeurs of the Légion d'honneur

Dwight Edward Aultman (February 2, 1872 – December 12, 1929) was an American army officer and brigadier general who served during World War I.

== Early life ==
Aultman was born in Allegheny, Pennsylvania. In 1894, he graduated number fourteen out a class of fifty-four from the United States Military Academy.

== Career ==
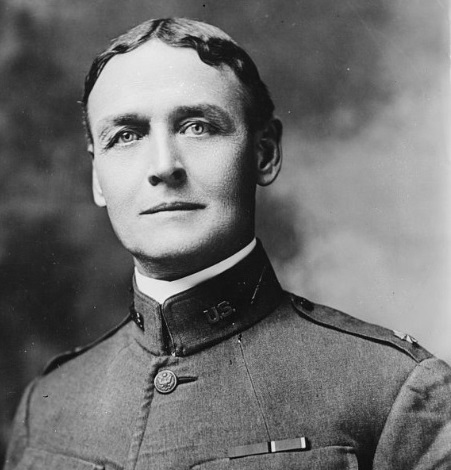
Dwight Aultman as Lieutenant colonel

After graduation, he was commissioned a second lieutenant in the Fourth Cavalry.

During the Spanish–American War, Aultman was a part of the Battle of San Juan Hill in 1898, as well as the Siege of Santiago in Cuba. From December 1898 to January 1899, he was aide to General Lloyd Wheaton and later General Joseph Warren Keifer. From 1901 to 1906, Aultman organized, commanded, and instructed the Cuban artillery.

From 1907 to 1911, he was an instructor at the department of languages of the service schools, and from 1914–1915 he was on special mission to Germany. Aultman retired as an instructor and graduated from the Army War College in 1916. In 1917 he wrote a book entitled Military Strength and Resources of the United States. From October 1917 to May 1918, Aultman commanded the Fifth Field Artillery Brigade, First Infantry Division. On April 18, 1918 he was promoted to brigadier general of the National Army and later commanded the 51st Field Artillery Brigade, 26th Division. He was appointed Chief of Artillery, Fifth Corps, in October 1918.

On April 27, 1921, he was again promoted to brigadier general.

== Awards ==
Aultman received the Army Distinguished Service Medal from the United States, the citation for which reads:

The President of the United States of America, authorized by Act of Congress, July 9, 1918, takes pleasure in presenting the Army Distinguished Service Medal to Brigadier General Dwight Edward Aultman, United States Army, for exceptionally meritorious and distinguished services to the Government of the United States, in a duty of great responsibility during World War I. As Chief of Artillery of the 5th Corps in the operations against the enemy in November 1918, by his exceptional skill as an artillerist, General Aultman was largely responsible for the rupture of the enemy's position and the breaking of his resistance.

In addition, he also received the Croix de Guerre as well as the commander of the Legion of Honor from France. Aultman also received a Silver Star for gallantry in action during the Santiago de Cuba Campaign, 22 June to 17 July 1898.

== Death and legacy ==
Dwight Edward Aultman died at the age of fifty-seven on December 2, 1929. Aultman and his wife Alma are buried at Arlington National Cemetery.

== Bibliography ==
- Davis, Henry Blaine Jr. Generals in Khaki. Raleigh, NC: Pentland Press, 1998. ISBN 1571970886, OCLC 231779136
- Marquis Who's Who, Inc. Who Was Who in American History, the Military. Chicago: Marquis Who's Who, 1975. ISBN 0837932017, OCLC 657162692
