= 1.1-inch/75-caliber gun =

1.1" / 75 Caliber Gun
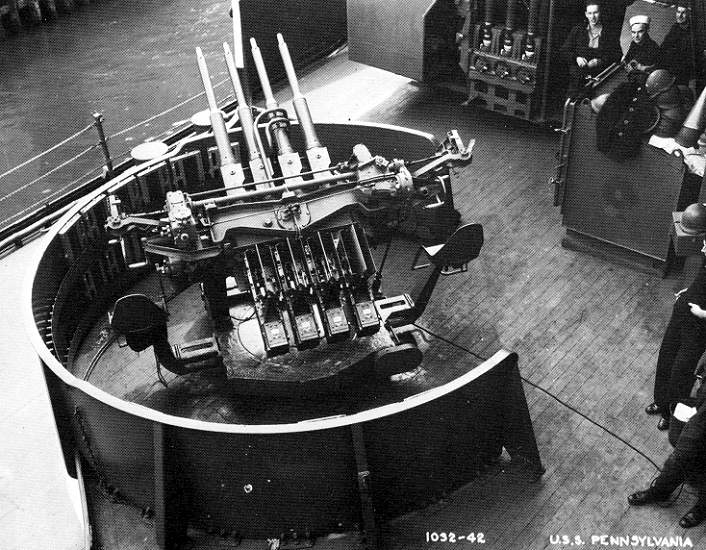
- Quadruple-mount 1.1-inch (28 mm) anti-aircraft cannon aboard the battleship USS Pennsylvania during World War II
- Type: Anti-aircraft gun
- Place of origin: United States

Service history
- Used by: United States Navy
- Wars: World War II

Production history
- Produced: 1938–1942 (Note: Though the guns were starting to be replaced by 1942, it served to the end of World War II on some ships such as USS Yorktown (CV-10).)
- No. built: ~1000

Specifications
- Mass: 10,500 lb (4,800 kg)
- Length: 119.6 in (3.04 m)
- Barrel length: 82.5 in (2.10 m) bore (75 calibers)
- Crew: 15
- Shell: 28 x 199mmSR 0.917 lb (0.416 kg) contact HE.
- Caliber: 1.1-inch (28 mm)
- Recoil: 3.25-inch (83 mm)
- Elevation: -15 to 110 degrees
- Traverse: 360 degrees
- Rate of fire: 150 rounds per minute
- Muzzle velocity: 2,700 ft/s (820 m/s)
- Maximum firing range: 7,000 yd (6,400 m)

The 1.1"/75 caliber gun was an American anti-aircraft weapon of World War II, used by the United States Navy. The name means that it had a bore diameter of 1.1 in (28 mm) and barrel caliber of 75 (1.1 inches × 75 = 82.5 in (2.1 m)). The gun was designed to replace the M2 Browning and four barrels were required to duplicate the rate of fire.

The first shipboard installation, in 1939, was nicknamed the Chicago Piano.

By 1941, these guns had been mounted on destroyers, cruisers, battleships, aircraft carriers, and some auxiliary ships. Nearly a thousand guns had been produced before production shifted to more reliable shipboard anti-aircraft machine guns in 1942. Quantities were minimal; one mount for a destroyer, two mounts for pre-1930s battleships, and four mounts for North Carolina–class and newer battleships. On at least some ships they were director-controlled.

The gun was very unpopular with its crews; it was said that due to its tendency to jam, the only way to fire one was to position a gunner's mate on his back underneath the mount, equipped with an assortment of wrenches and hammers to clear them. It was replaced by the 20 mm (0.79 in) Oerlikon cannon or the 40 mm (1.6 in) Bofors gun whenever possible, but served until the end of the war on some ships. A twin Bofors gun was about the same weight, and was a much more powerful gun. The air-cooled Oerlikon had similar effective range and rate of fire with considerably less weight. The Oerlikon could not sustain fire for as long as the water-cooled 1.1–inch, but six Oerlikons could be installed for the weight of a single 1.1–inch quad mount.

== History ==
The gun was based on patents of Richmond, Virginia, inventor Robert Hudson, who used a complicated gas-recoil operating system adapted to .30-06 Springfield and .50 BMG. The Navy's Bureau of Ordnance (BuOrd) had decided the M2 Browning was inadequate for future anti-aircraft duties, and modified Hudson's design for a new, high-velocity 1.1 inches (28 mm) cartridge. The water-cooled prototype was tested at Naval Surface Warfare Center Dahlgren Division in 1934:

The 1.1" gun was designed as a weapon to be used against dive and horizontal bombers and as such supplement the defensive characteristics of the caliber .50 machine gun. The first definite action in this direction took place on October 11, 1928, when the Chief of the Bureau announced a meeting of a Special Board on Naval Ordnance for October 17 to consider and submit a plan for the development and test of a machine gun of 1" or greater. As a result of this and successive meetings, the decision was made to develop a 1.1" machine gun. On December 13, 1928, Mr. C.F. Jeansen, a Bureau Engineer, began an investigation of the weight of ammunition for the gun and in March 1929 Mr. Burk and Mr. Chadwick, likewise Bureau Engineers, were designated to design the gun mechanism. The round as finally adopted weighed 2 pounds and employed a .92 pound percussion-fuzed projectile. The design of the gun mechanism was completed in 1930 and tests on the initial models were carried out in March, April and May 1931. The tests, which demonstrated a cyclic rate of 90 r.p.m., were characterized by primer blow backs, misfires, and stuck cases—as well as magazine and cradle difficulties. During the next two years, designers corrected these faults and the cyclic rate increased to 140. The design was turned over to the Naval Gun Factory for production in 1934. It is interesting to note that work on the gun was financed not from regular Navy appropriations but from funds supplied through the National Industrial Recovery Act.

Development proved difficult and the gun was not able to achieve its design goals in terms of accuracy and reliability. When finally available in quantity it was no longer deemed acceptable:

In recognition of the growing necessity for antiaircraft fire, the more or less continuous Bureau experimentation with double-purpose guns during the 1920s finally culminated in the early 1930s in the development of the 5"/38 DP gun, which fulfilled its mission throughout the war with very little criticism. While the longer range antiaircraft gun field was taken care of, except for insufficient numbers, the situation was far from satisfactory in the short range category. Neither the .50 caliber machine gun, effective enough in plane-to-plane fire at pointblank range, nor the 1.1" which the Bureau developed in quadruple mounts in the 1930s, were competent to meet the menace of the Second World War plane. The 1.1", too heavy to serve as a "last-ditch" free mount and too light to span the gap between the small machine guns and the 5-inch guns, even had all its "bugs" been eliminated. The lack of adequate short range antiaircraft guns together with insufficient quantities of the best guns then available created a situation which by 1940 could hardly be termed anything but critical.

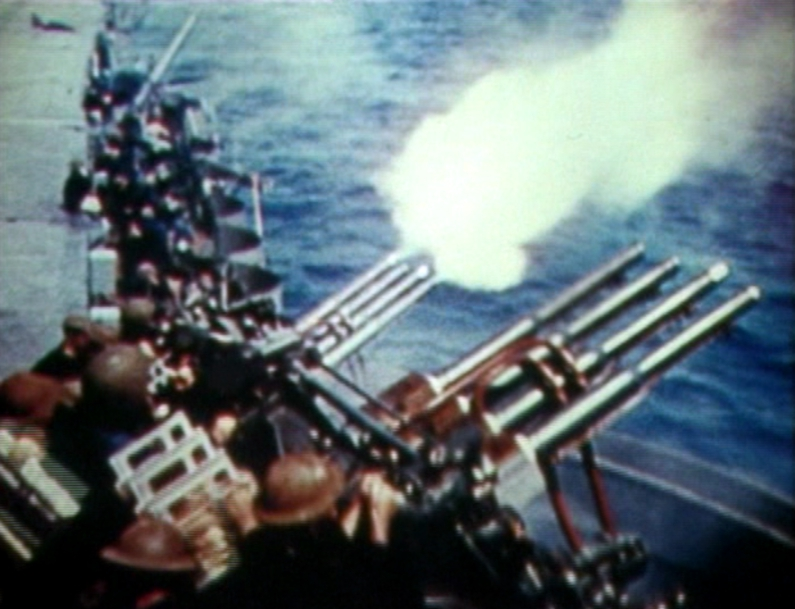
1.1" mounts firing aboard USS Hornet (CV-8), May 1942. During the battle of Midway.

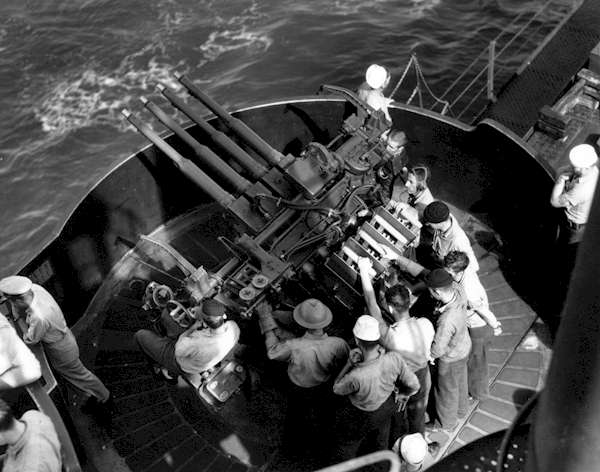
1.1" mount aboard USS Enterprise (CV-6), 1942.

Before the Japanese struck Pearl Harbor on 7 December, five 1.1–inch quad mounts had been sent to the Cavite Navy Yard, in the Philippines, for fitting to the cruiser USS Houston of the Asiatic Fleet. Four were mounted on Houston and the fifth was a spare. To the surprise of most at Cavite, the one spare left on the dock survived the Japanese bombing. Since the mount was too heavy for the few harbor patrol vessels still stationed in Manila Bay, the fifth spare mount was put on a barge, along with 25,000 rounds of 1.1–inch ammunition, taken to Corregidor and "donated" to the US Army. There is no further record of what happened to the 1.1–inch mount sent to Corregidor.

Some online articles referring to this "donated to the Army" mount exist. One states the guns were installed in a special concrete mount and used successfully against Japanese airplanes until destroyed by gunfire.

The gun first saw action during the attack on Pearl Harbor. There are no records of which planes might have been hit by the large number of 1.1–inch rounds fired, but numerous accounts exist of damage caused by the impact-fuzed projectiles missing their targets and exploding like hand grenades when they returned to earth.

== Preserved ==
A restored 1.1–inch quad mount is installed on the museum ship North Carolina and another is on the hangar deck of Yorktown. The museum and park Freedom Park (Omaha, Nebraska) has a 1.1–inch quad mount on its grounds. One quad mount is in Trophy Park at Norfolk Naval Shipyard. One quad mount was at the Washington Navy Yard in the 1990s, and may still remain there. One quad mount was in storage with the battleship Texas but it was on loan from the Navy and was returned to the Navy at an unknown date. The location of that mount is now unknown.

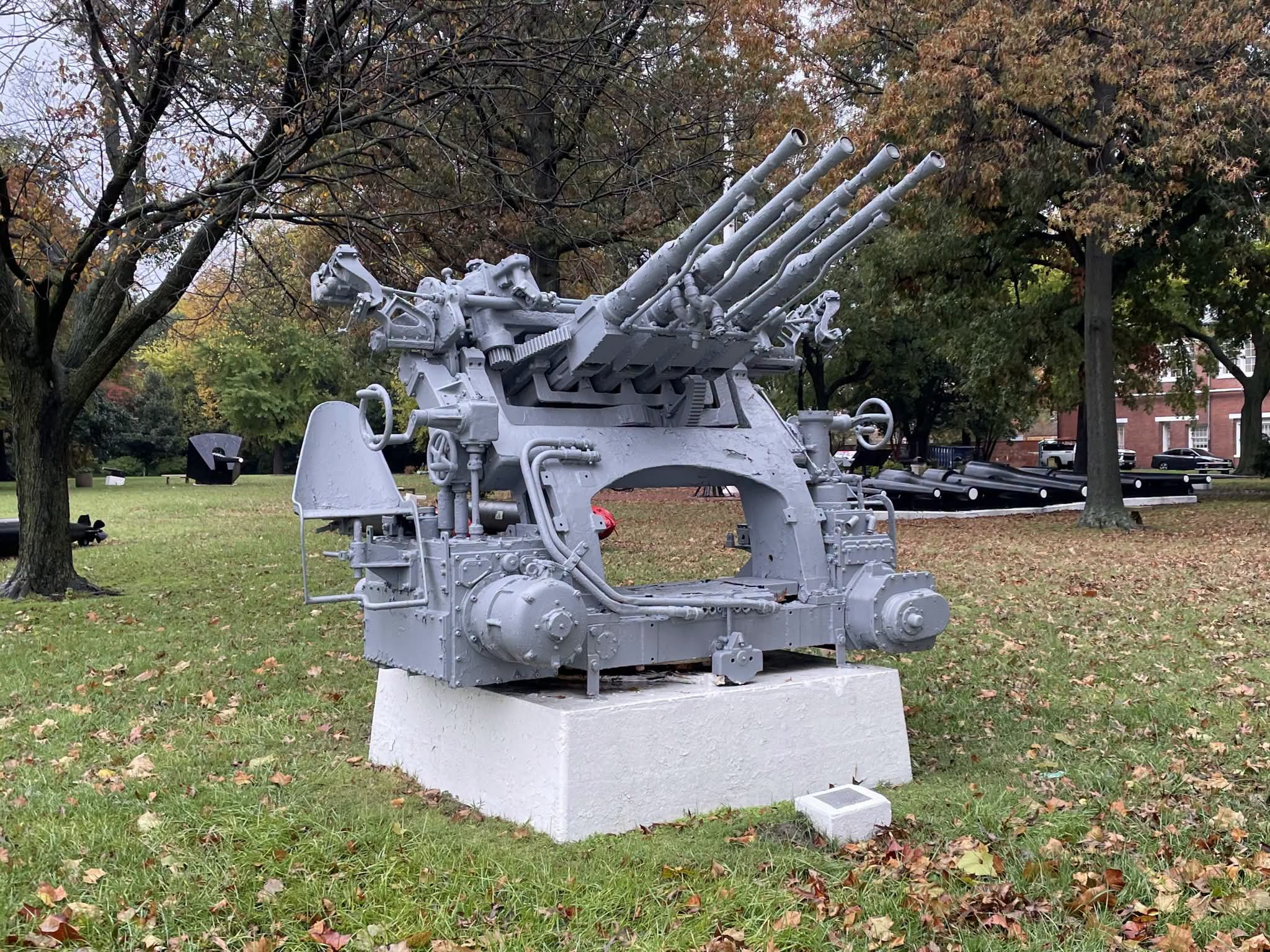
1.1" AA Gun Norfolk Naval Yard Trophy Park

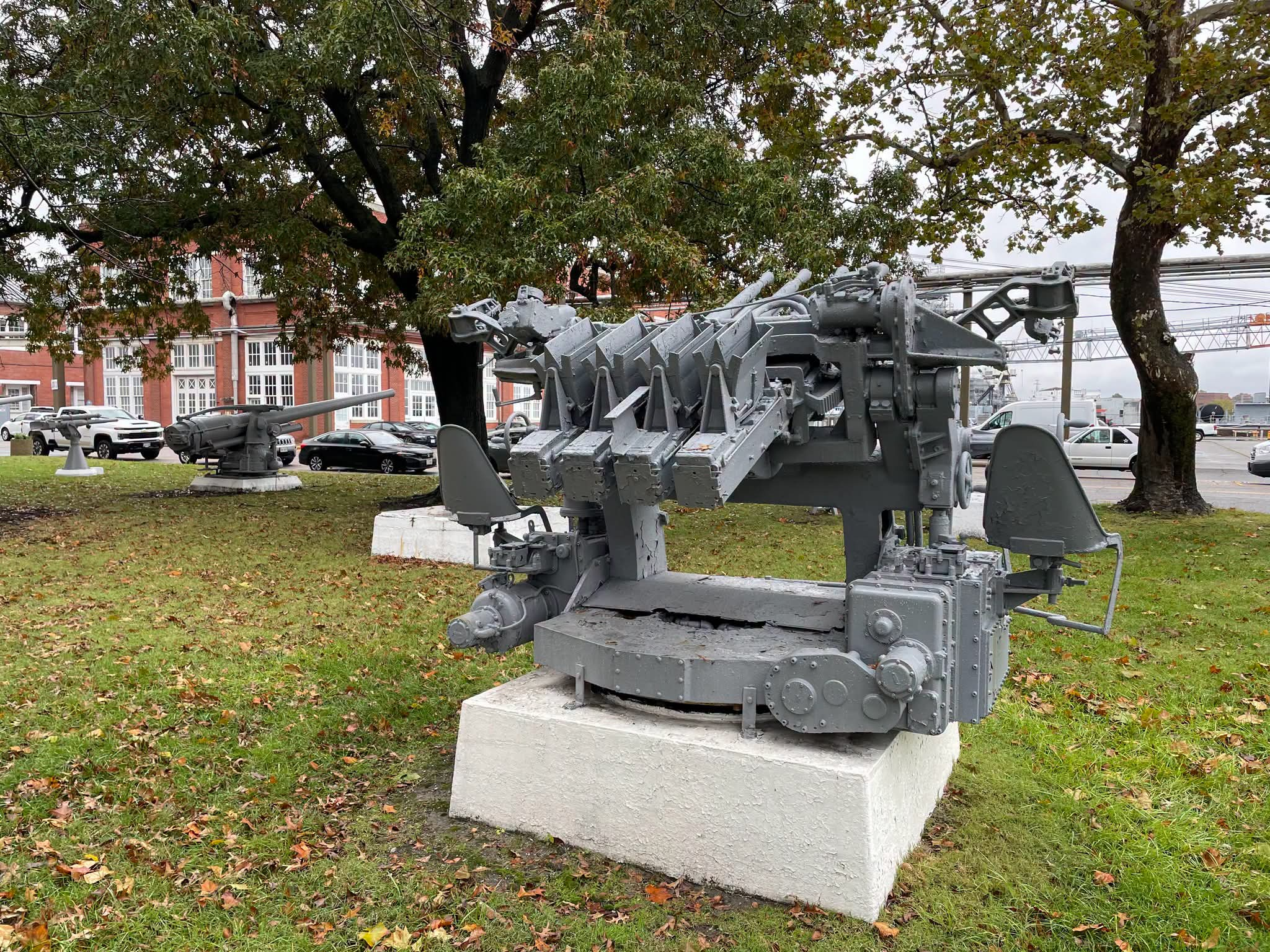
1.1" AA Gun Norfolk Naval Yard Trophy Park

== See also ==
- List of anti-aircraft guns
- List of artillery of the United States
