= Troopship =

Ship used to carry soldiers

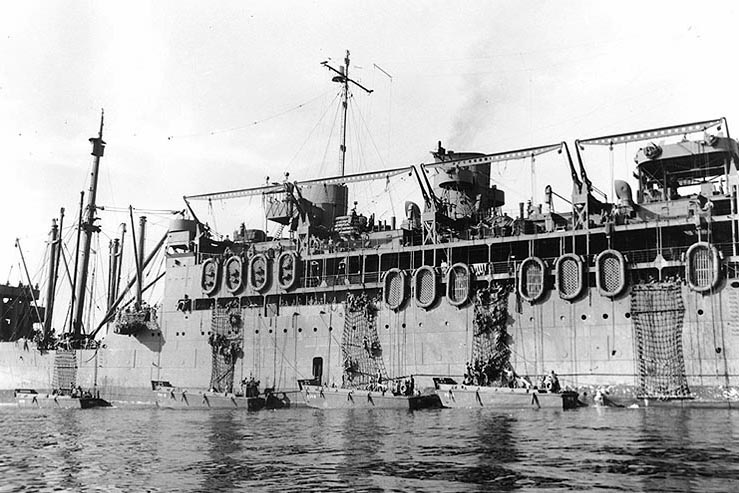
Soldiers climb down netting on the sides of the attack transport USS McCawley on 14 June 1943, rehearsing for landings on New Georgia.

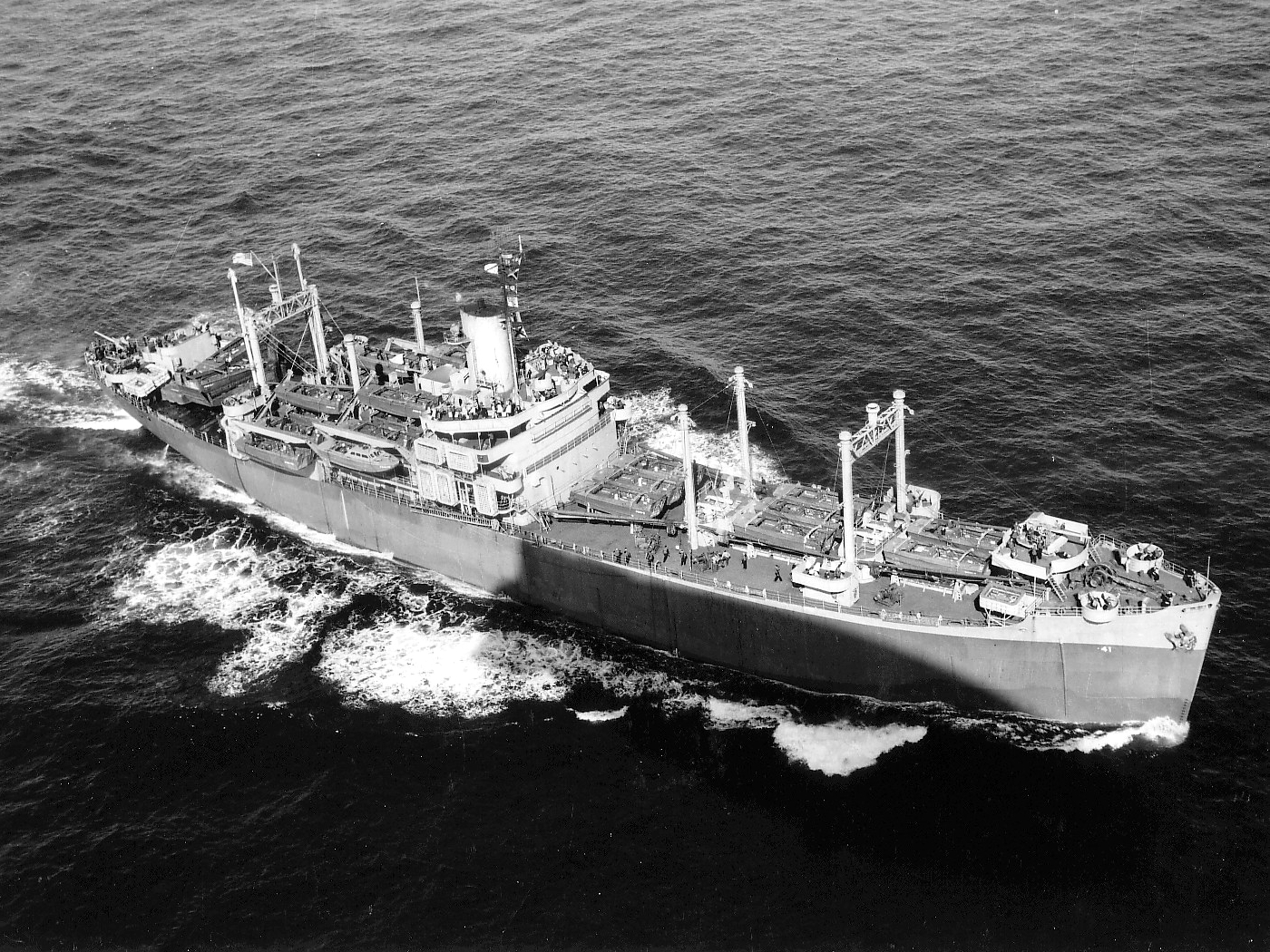
USS DuPage, a Bayfield-class attack transport underway with its complement of landing craft

A troopship (also troop ship or troop transport or trooper) is a ship used to carry soldiers, either in peacetime or wartime. Troopships were often drafted from commercial shipping fleets, and were unable to land troops directly on shore, typically loading and unloading at a seaport or onto smaller vessels, either tenders or barges.

Attack transports, a variant of ocean-going troopship adapted to transporting invasion forces ashore, carry their own fleet of landing craft. Landing ships beach themselves and bring their troops directly ashore.

== History ==
Ships to transport troops were used in antiquity. Ancient Rome used the navis lusoria, a small vessel powered by rowers and sail, to move soldiers on the Rhine and Danube.

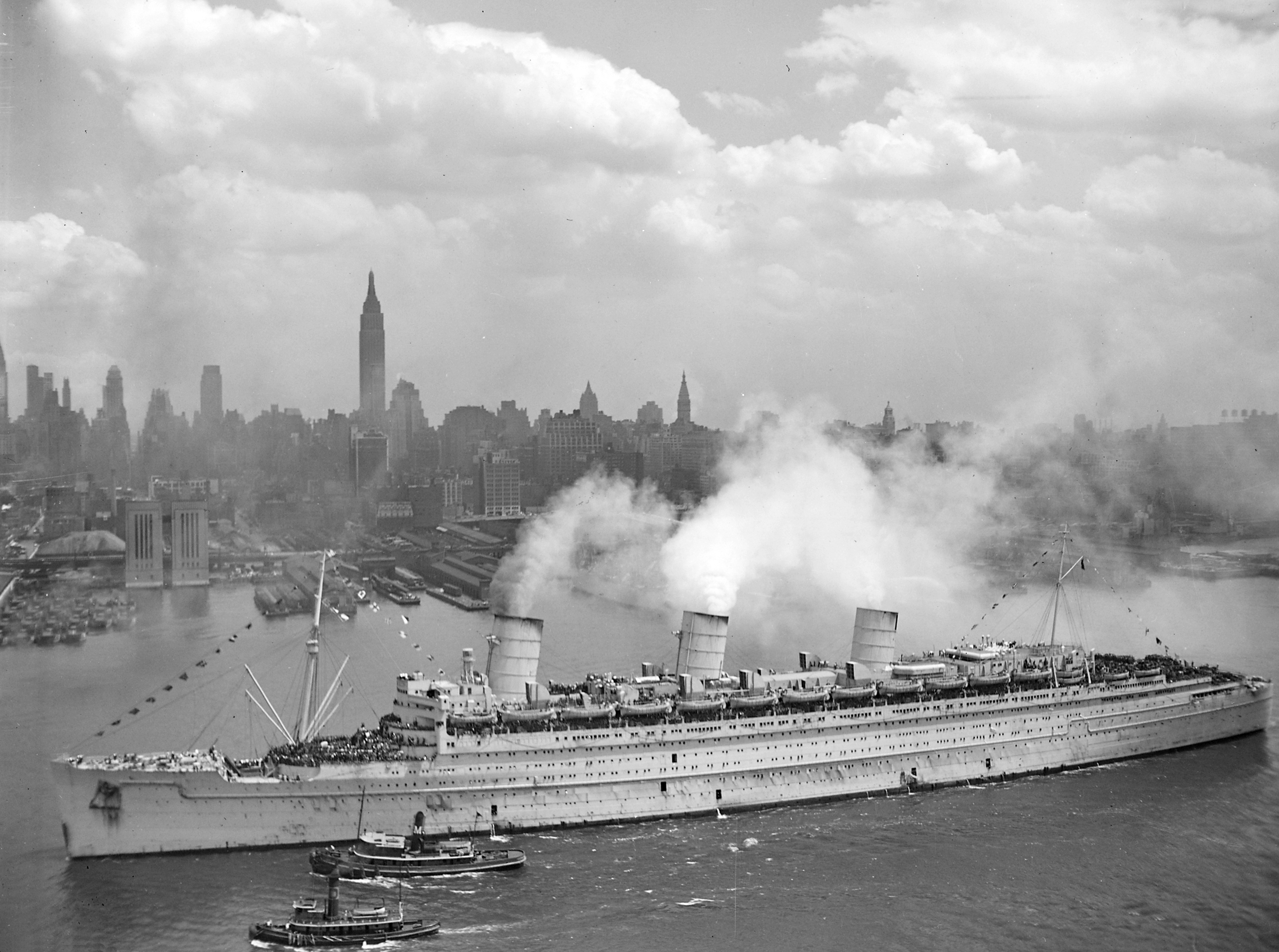
Nicknamed the "Grey Ghost", RMS Queen Mary holds the all-time record for most troops on one passage, 15,740 on a late July 1943 run from the U.S. to Europe.

The modern troopship has as long a history as passenger ships do, as most maritime nations enlisted their support in military operations (either by leasing the vessels or by impressing them into service) when their normal naval forces were deemed insufficient for the task. In the 19th century, navies frequently chartered civilian ocean liners, and from the start of the 20th century painted them gray and added a degree of armament; their speed, originally intended to minimize passage time for civilian user, proved valuable for outrunning submarines and enemy cruisers in war. HMT Olympic even rammed and sank a U-boat during one of its wartime crossings. Individual liners capable of exceptionally high speed transited without escorts; smaller or older liners with poorer performance were protected by operating in convoys.

Most major naval powers in the late 19th and early 20th centuries provided their domestic shipping lines with subsidies to build fast ocean liners capable of conversions to auxiliary cruisers during wartime. The British government, for example, aided both Cunard and the White Star Line in constructing the liners RMS Mauretania, RMS Aquitania, RMS Olympic and RMS Britannic. However, when the vulnerability of these ships to return fire was realized during World War I most were used instead as troopships or hospital ships.

Soldiers were crowded onto troopships far exceeding normal capacity. SS Leviathan carried 14,416 troops on one World War I trip, setting a record for the most humans on one vessel up to then. RMS Queen Mary and RMS Queen Elizabeth were two of the most famous converted liners of World War II. When they were fully converted, each could carry well over 10,000 troops per trip. Queen Mary holds the all-time record, with 15,740 troops on a single passage in late July 1943, transporting 765,429 military personnel during the war.

== World War II ==
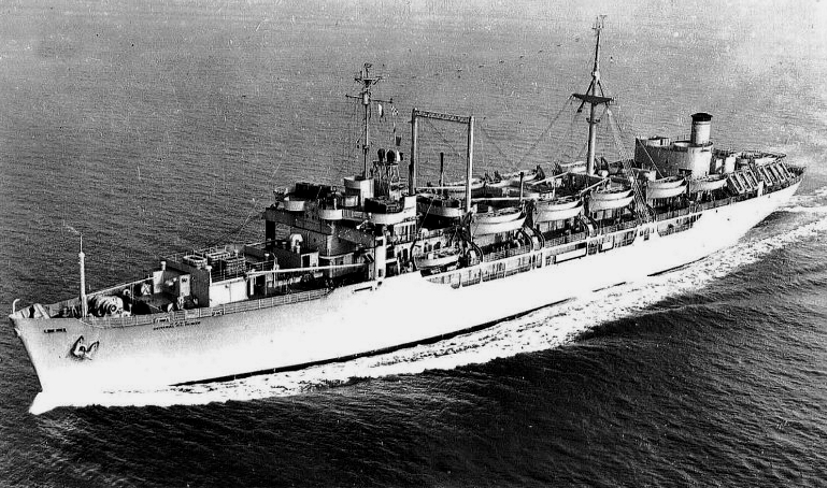
A U.S. General G. O. Squier-class troop transport

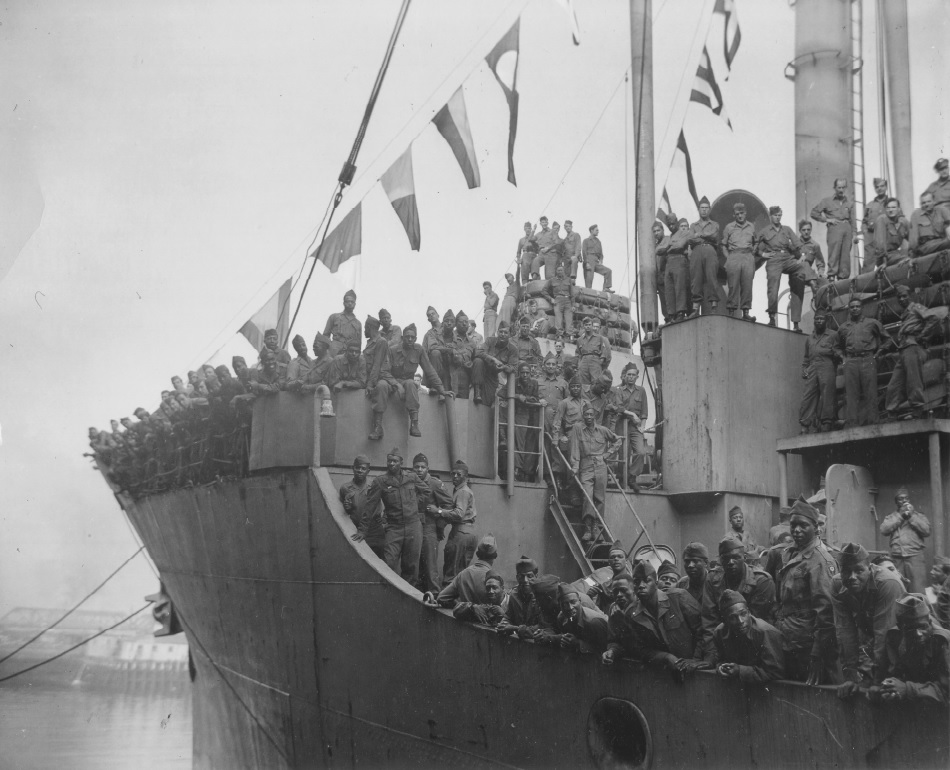
Aiken Victory, a Victory ship troop ship conversion, arriving in Boston with 1,958 troops from Europe, 26 July 1945

Large numbers of troopships were employed during World War II, including 220 "Limited Capacity" Liberty ship conversions, 30 Type C4 ship-based General G. O. Squier-class, a class of 84 Victory ship conversions, and a small number of Type-C3-S-A2 ship-based dedicated transports, and 15 classes of attack transports, of which some 400 alone were built.

- The modified Liberties were capable of transporting up to 450, 550, or 650 (sources vary) troops or prisoners-of-war. Modifications included installation of bunks stacked five deep on the forward tweendeck, additional shower and head facilities, two additional diesel-powered generators, and installation of two more Oerlikon 20-mm automatic cannons.
- 30 Type C4 ship-based General G. O. Squier-class, the largest carrying over 6,000 passengers.
- A class of Victory ship-based dedicated troopship was developed late in World War II. A total of 84 such VC2-S-AP2 hull conversions was completed.
- A class of Type C3 ship – comprising mainly C3-S-A2 and C3-S-A3 hulls – was also converted to dedicated troopships, capable of carrying 2,100 troops, was also developed.
- At least 15 classes of attack transport, consisting of at least 400 ships specially equipped for landing invasion forces rather than general troop movement.

=== Designation ===
The designation HMT (Her/His Majesty's Transport) would normally replace RMS (Royal Mail Ship), MV (Motor Vessel) or SS (Steamship) for ships converted to troopship duty with the United Kingdom's Royal Navy. The United States used two designations: WSA for troopships operated by the War Shipping Administration using Merchant Marine crews, and USS (United States Ship) for vessels accepted into and operated by the United States Navy. Initially, troopships adapted as attack transports were designated AP; starting in 1942 keel-up attack transports received the designation APA.

"HMT" was also used, for a while, to designate "Hired Military Transport."

== Post–World War II ==
In the era of the Cold War, the United States designed the United States ship so that she could easily be converted from a liner to a troopship, in case of war. More recently, Queen Elizabeth 2 and Canberra were requisitioned by the Royal Navy to carry British soldiers to the Falklands War. By the end of the twentieth century, nearly all long-distance personnel transfer was done by airlift in military transport aircraft.

== Some notable troopships ==
- USS Agamemnon
- HMT Aquitania
- SS Belgenland
- HMS Birkenhead
- SS Cap Arcona (1927)
- RMS Carmania
- SS Dorchester
- HMT Dunera
- HMT Empire Windrush (ex MV Monte Rosa)
- RMS Empress of Britain
- SS Great Eastern
- USS Henry R. Mallory
- SS Justicia
- RMS Laconia
- HMT Lancastria
- USS Leviathan (ex Vaterland)
- HMT Mauretania (Sister ship to Lusitania)
- SS Mendi
- HMT Olympic (Sister ship to Titanic)
- SS Orontes
- HMS Otranto
- SS Oxfordshire
- RMS Queen Mary
- RMS Queen Elizabeth
- HMT Rohna
- HMS Tamar
- USS Von Steuben (ex Kronprinz Wilhelm)
- USS West Point
- HMAS Jervis Bay (first large catamaran to enter naval service)

== See also ==
- List of United States Navy amphibious warfare ships § Attack Transport (APA)
- List of United States Navy amphibious warfare ships § Amphibious Transport (LPA) – APA redesignation
- List of auxiliaries of the United States Navy § Transports (AP, T-AP)

== Bibliography ==
- James Dugan, The Great Iron Ship, 1953 (regularly reprinted) ISBN 0-7509-3447-6
- Stephen Harding, Great Liners at War, Motorbooks Int'l, Osceola, WI, US, 1997 ISBN 0-7603-0346-0
- Goron Newell, Ocean Liners of the 20th Century, Bonanza Books, US, 1963 ISBN 0-517-03168-X
