= Callan (disambiguation) =

Callan is a given name and surname of Irish and Scottish origin.

Callan may also refer to:

== Places ==
=== County Kilkenny, Ireland ===
- Callan (Parliament of Ireland constituency), a former constituency in the Irish House of Commons
- Callan, County Kilkenny, a town
- Callan (barony), a barony

=== Other places ===
- Callan River, County Armagh, Northern Ireland
- Mount Callan, County Clare, Ireland
- Callan, a barangay in Pototan, Iloilo, Philippines

== Other ==
- Callan (film), a 1974 film version of the TV series
- Callan (TV series), a UK spy series, 1967–72
- Callan Data Systems, a 1980s U.S. computer manufacturer
- Camp Callan, a former U.S. army training center
- Clara Callan, a 2001 novel by Richard B. Wright
- USS General R. E. Callan (AP-139), a U.S. Navy transport ship

== See also ==
- Calla (name)
- Callen (disambiguation)
- Calan (disambiguation)
