= Kallen =

Kallen is both a surname and a given name. Notable people with the name include:

- Horace Kallen (1882–1974), American philosopher
- Jackie Kallen (born 1946), American boxing manager
- Kitty Kallen (1921–2016), American singer
- Arvid Emanuel Kallen (1895–1969), Swedish American businessman
- Kallen Esperian (born 1961), American singer

Fictional characters:

- Kallen Stadtfeld, character in the anime series Code Geass

== See also ==
- Callen (disambiguation)
- Gunnar Källén (1926–1968), Swedish Theoretical physicist and a professor at Lund University
- Kalen
- Kellan
- Kylen
- Van der Kellen
- Wilberd van der Kallen (born 1947), Dutch mathematician
