= Kalen =

Kalen is a given name. Notable people with the name include:

- Kalen Ballage (born 1995), American football player
- Kalen Damessi (born 1990), Togolese football player
- Kalen DeBoer (born 1974), American football player and coach
- Kalen Jackson (born 1987), American football executive
- Kalen Porter (born 1985), Canadian singer-songwriter from Alberta
- Kalen Thornton (born 1982), American football player

== See also ==
- Gunnar Källén (1926–1968), Swedish physicist
- Kalen Kannu, special Finnish Ice Hockey Award
- Kalena
- Kallen
- Karlen
- Kaulen
- Kylen

Media related to Kalen at Wikimedia Commons
