= Kellen =

Kellen may refer to:

== People ==
=== Given name ===
- Kellen Briggs (born 1983), American hockey player
- Kellen Clemens (born 1983), American football player
- Kellen Damico (born 1989), American tennis player
- Kellen Davis (born 1985), American football player
- Kellen Diesch (born 2000), American football player
- Kellen Dunham (born 1993), American basketball player
- Kellen Fisher (born 2004), English footballer
- Kellen Goff (born 1995), American voice actor
- Kellen Gulley (born 1994), American soccer player
- Kellen Heard (born 1985), American football player
- Kellen Kariuki, Kenyan businesswoman
- Kellen Kulbacki (born 1985), American baseball player
- Kellen McCoy (born 1987), American basketball player
- Kellen McGregor, lead guitarist in Memphis May Fire
- Kellen Mond (born 1999), American football player
- Kellen Moore (born 1989), American football player
- Kellen Nesbitt, American football coach
- Kellen Sampson (born 1985), American basketball coach
- Kellen Winslow (born 1957), American football player
- Kellen Winslow II (born 1983), American football player

=== Surname ===
- Henri Kellen (1927–1950), Luxembourgish cyclist
- Konrad Kellen, American political scientist
- Stephen M. Kellen (1914–2004), American investment banker

== Places ==
- Kellenbach, a municipality in Rhineland-Palatinate, Germany
- Kellen, North Rhine-Westphalia (a.k.a. Kleve), a town in Germany

== Others ==
- Kellen Tavadon, a fictional character in The Obsidian Trilogy novel
- Kellen Transport, a bus company in the Philippines
- Kellen's Dormouse, a species of rodent

== See also ==
- McKellen, a surname
- Kellan, a given name
- Van der kellen, a surname
- Kellé, a village in Congo
