= Kelen =

Kelen may refer to:

- Kēlen, a constructed language
- Kelen, a surname; notable people include:
  - Christopher Kelen (born 1958), Australian academic, writer and artist
  - István Kelen (1912–2003), Hungarian table tennis player, journalist and playwright
  - János Kelen (1911–1991), Hungarian long-distance runner
  - József Kelen (1892–1939), Hungarian engineer and socialist
  - Michael A. Kelen (born 1948), Canadian judge
  - Ron Vander Kelen (1939–2016), American football player
  - S. K. Kelen (born 1956), Australian poet and educator
  - Tibor Kelen (1938–2001), Hungarian opera singer and cantor
- Kelen, a given name; notable people include:
  - Kelen Coleman (born 1984), American actress

== See also ==
- Kellen, another name
- Kelan (disambiguation)
