= Kellan =

- Gender: Male
- Language: English

Origin
- Language: Irish

Kellan, also spelt Kellin, is a male given name. Similar names include Kellen, Kaelan, Kallen, Kelan, and Kellyn.

== People ==
=== Kellan ===
- Kellan Gordon (born 1997), English footballer
- Kellan Grady (born 1997), American basketball player
- Kellan Lain (born 1989), Canadian ice hockey player
- Kellan Lutz (born 1985), American actor
- Kellan Quick (born 1983), American football player
- Kellan Wyatt (21st century, American football player

=== Kellin ===
- Kellin Deglan (born 1992), Canadian baseball player
- Kellin Quinn (born 1986), lead singer of American post-hardcore band Sleeping with Sirens

== Fictional characters ==
- Kellin, alien in Star Trek: Voyager episode "Unforgettable"
- Lucas Kellan, protagonist and player character in Killzone: Shadow Fall video game
- Father Kellan Ashby, character in the TV series Sons of Anarchy

== See also ==
- Kellen (disambiguation)
- Kallen
- Kylen
