= Kylen =

- Kylen or Kylian is a variant of the name Kyle, and "means narrow or straight" Notable people with the name include:
- Kylen Granson, American football player
- Kylen Schulte (1983–2021), American female murder victim
- Kylian Hazard (born 1995), Belgian football player
- Kylian Mbappé (born 1998), French football player

== See also ==
- Gunnar Källén (1926–1968), Swedish physicist
- Jiří Kylián (born 1947), Czech dancer and choreographer
- Kalen
- Kellan
- Kylene Barker (born 1955), American pageant winner
- Kyle
- Kyline Alcantara (born 2002), Filipino actor, singer, and model
- Kyren (name)
