= Legislative districts of San Jose del Monte =

Legislative districts of the Philippines

The congressional districts of Bulacan since 2022 Lone District of San Jose del Monte

The legislative districts of San Jose del Monte are the representations of the component city of San Jose del Monte in the Congress of the Philippines. The city is currently represented in the lower house of the Congress through its lone congressional district.

== History ==
San Jose del Monte was represented as part of Bulacan's at-large district in the Malolos Congress (1898–1899) and the National Assembly of the Second Philippine Republic (1943–1944) and the second district from 1907 to 1941 and from 1945 to 1972. The province of Bulacan was represented in the Interim Batasang Pambansa as part of Region III from 1978 to 1984, and elected four representatives at-large to the Regular Batasang Pambansa in 1984.

San Jose del Monte was placed in the fourth district of Bulacan after the reorganization of the province's legislative districts under the new Constitution which took effect on February 7, 1987. San Jose del Monte, which became a city in 2000, was separated from the fourth district of Bulacan on December 18, 2003 by virtue of Republic Act No. 9230 which amended the city charter (Republic Act No. 8797) authored by then Congressman Angelito Sarmiento, and elected its own representative starting in the 2004 elections. However, the city's residents still vote as part of the province's 4th Sangguniang Panlalawigan district for the purpose of electing Provincial Board members.

== Lone District ==
Legislative districts and representatives of San Jose Del Monte City
District	Current Representative	Party		Constituent LGUs	Area	Population (2020)
District	Current Representative	Local	National	Constituent LGUs	Area	Population (2020)
Lone	Arthur Robes (since 2025); Tungkong Mangga	AR	Lakas–CMD	List: Assumption; Bagong Buhay I; Bagong Buhay II; Bagong Buhay III; Citrus; Ciudad Real; Dulong Bayan; Fátima I; Fátima II; Fátima III; Fátima IV; Fátima V; Francisco Homes-Guijo; Francisco Homes-Mulawin; Francisco Homes-Narra; Francisco Homes-Yakal; Gaya-Gaya; Graceville; Gumaoc-Central; Gumaoc-East; Gumaoc-West; Kaybanban; Kaypian; Lawang Pari; Maharlika; Minuyan I; Minuayan II; Minuyan III; Minuyan IV; Minuyan Proper; Minuyan V; Muzon East; Muzon Proper; Muzon South; Muzon West; Paradise III; Población; Población I; San Isidro; San Manuel; San Martín I; San Martín II; San Martín III; San Martín IV; San Pedro; San Rafael I; San Rafael II; San Rafael III; San Rafael IV; San Rafael V; San Roque; San Juan; Santa Cruz I; Santa Cruz II; Santa Cruz III; Santa Cruz IV; Santa Cruz V; Santo Cristo; Santo Niño I; Santo Niño II; Sapang Palay Proper; Saint Martin de Porres; Tungkong Mangga	651,813	105.53 km^{2}

== See also ==
- Legislative districts of Bulacan
