= Lambda function =

Lambda function may refer to:

== Mathematics ==
- Dirichlet lambda function, λ(s) = (1 – 2^{−s})ζ(s) where ζ is the Riemann zeta function
- Liouville function, λ(n) = (–1)^{Ω(n)}
- Von Mangoldt function, Λ(n) = log p if n is a positive power of the prime p
- Modular lambda function, λ(τ), a highly symmetric holomorphic function on the complex upper half-plane
- Carmichael function, λ(n), in number theory and group theory

== Computing ==
- Lambda calculus, in computer science
- Lambda function (computer programming), or lambda abstraction
- AWS Lambda, a form of serverless computing

== Other uses ==
- Källén function, λ(x,y,z) or triangle function, a symmetric polynomial in particle physics

== See also ==
- Lambda point, of fluid helium
