= Robert Emmet Callan =

United States Army general

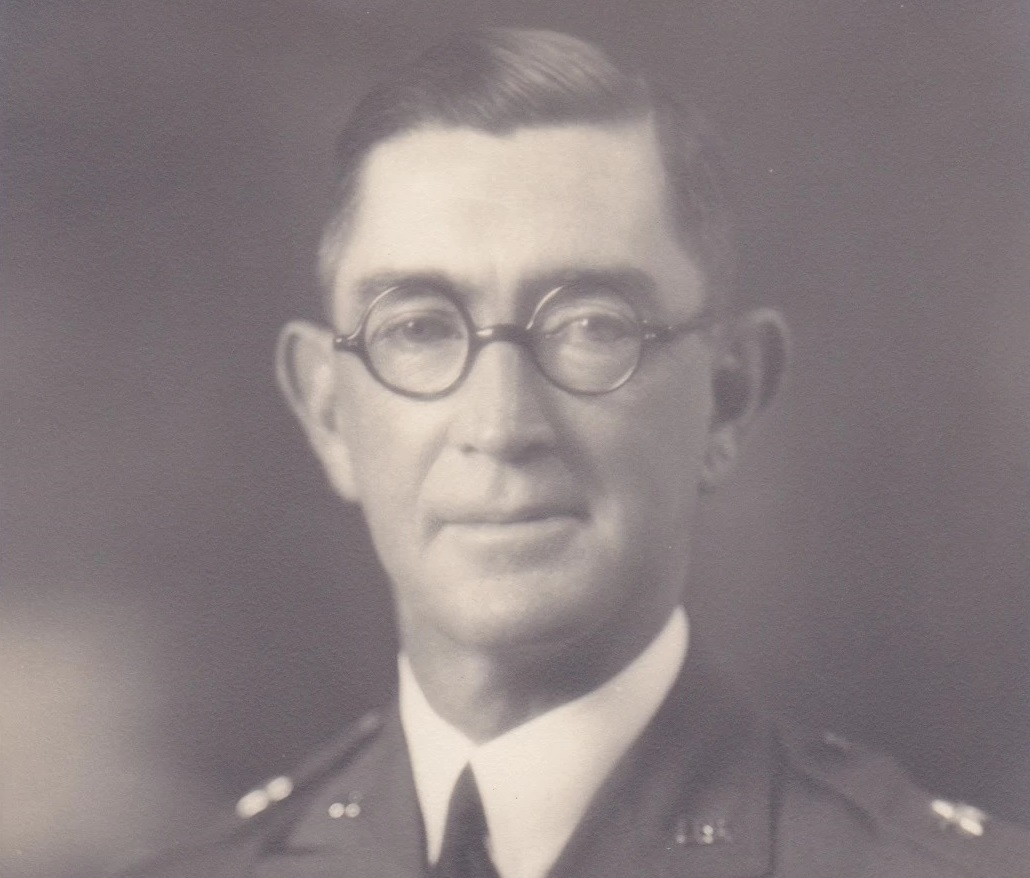
- Callan as a brigadier general, circa 1925
- Born: March 24, 1874; Baltimore, Maryland
- Died: November 20, 1936 (aged 62); Washington, D.C.
- Military career
- Allegiance: United States of America
- Branch: United States Army
- Service years: 1896–1936
- Rank: Major General
- Unit: U.S. Coast Artillery Corps
- Commands: Fort Andrews, Massachusetts; Military Information Division, Philippine Department; 65th Artillery Regiment; 33rd Coast Artillery Brigade; Organization and Training Center for Tractor Artillery; 2nd Coast Artillery District; Panama Coast Artillery District; 3rd Coast Artillery District; U.S. Army Coast Artillery School; Separate Coast Artillery Brigade, Hawaii; Third Corps Area
- Conflicts: Spanish–American War; World War I
- Awards: Army Distinguished Service Medal, Legion of Honor (Officer) (France); Order of the Crown of Italy

Major General Robert Emmet Callan (March 24, 1874 – November 20, 1936) was a distinguished United States Army Coast Artillery officer who served in the United States and overseas in places such as Puerto Rico, France and the Philippines. He saw frontline action in the Spanish–American War and World War I.

== Early career ==
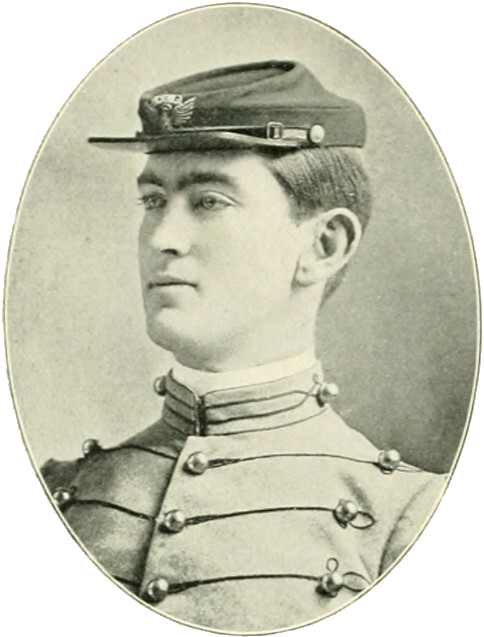
Callan as a West Point cadet in 1896

Callan was born on March 24, 1874, in Baltimore, Maryland, but his family moved to Knoxville, Tennessee in 1877. He attended the University of Tennessee from 1888 to 1891. Before graduating from this school, he entered the United States Military Academy at West Point and graduated there, fourth in a class of 73, in June 1896.

After graduating from West Point, Callan became a commissioned officer of the United States Army. He was a Second Lieutenant in the Fifth U.S. Artillery. He was in camp at Port Tampa, Florida, from May to June 2, 1898. He participated in the Puerto Rican Campaign of the Spanish–American War and was in action at Hormigueros, Puerto Rico on August 10, 1898. He also served in Cuba. Callan became a First Lieutenant on March 2, 1899, while serving in the Fifth U.S. Artillery.

Callan was an assistant professor of mathematics at West Point from 1899 to 1903. He then served in Washington, D.C. where he met Margaret Valentine Kelly, a senior employee of the United States Mint who had served as acting director for a time. On October 10, 1912, they were married in her hometown of Portsmouth, New Hampshire. In 1917, he became chief of staff of the Philippine Department.

== World War I ==
During World War I, Callan served as a temporary colonel from August 1917 to August 1918 and temporary brigadier general from August 1918 to May 1919. He was on duty in France and was Chief of Staff of the 1st Army Artillery, Commanding General of the 33rd Artillery Brigade and participated in the Montdidier-Noyon Defensive and in the Aisne-Marne Offensive. He was awarded the Army Distinguished Service Medal for his service during World War I. The citation for the medal reads:

The President of the United States of America, authorized by Act of Congress, July 9, 1918, takes pleasure in presenting the Army Distinguished Service Medal to Brigadier General Robert Emmet Callan, United States Army, for exceptionally meritorious and distinguished services to the Government of the United States, in a duty of great responsibility during World War I. As Chief of Staff of the Army Artillery, First Army, General Callan exhibited ability in organization of that unit. Later, as Commanding General of the 33d Coast Artillery Brigade, he displayed high technical ability. Though confronted with innumerable difficulties, he developed the heavy artillery regiments under his command into combat units of remarkable efficiency, which units proved to be of the utmost value during the St. Mihiel and Meuse-Argonne offensives.

== Later career ==
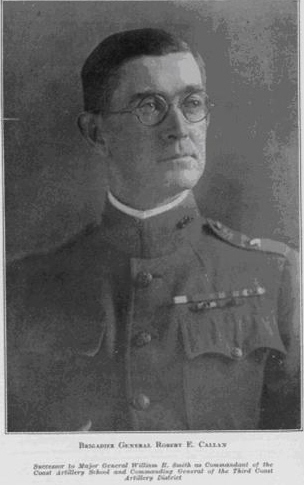
as brigadier general

After World War I, Callan reverted to his permanent rank of lieutenant colonel. He was soon promoted to colonel in June 1920. After graduating from the United States Army War College in June 1921, Callan was promoted to brigadier general. He served in New York, Panama and Hawaii before his promotion to major general in April 1931. General Callan was Assistant Chief of Staff in the War Department from 1931 to 1935. He commanded the Third Corps Area in Baltimore, Maryland, until retiring at his own request in January 1936 after almost forty years of service.

== Death and legacy ==
General Callan died on November 20, 1936, at his home in Washington, D.C., at age 62. He was interred at Arlington National Cemetery three days later.

== Awards and honors ==
In addition to receiving the Distinguished Service Medal, Callan was honored by the military in several other ways. Camp Callan, a World War II artillery training center, was named in his honor. He was also memorialized by the troopship USS General R. E. Callan (AP-139).

France made him an officer of the Legion of Honour.

Italy recognized him with the Order of the Crown of Italy.

== Additional reading ==
- The Coast Artillery Journal December 1924
- Historic California Posts: Camp Callan
