= Kaulen =

Kaulen is a German surname. Notable people with the surname include:

- Franz Philip Kaulen (1827–1907), German Catholic scriptural scholar
- Hugo Kaulen (1869–1954), German balloonist

== See also ==
- Kallen
- Karlen
