= Kellen Transport =

Bus company in the Philippines

Kellen Transport Inc.
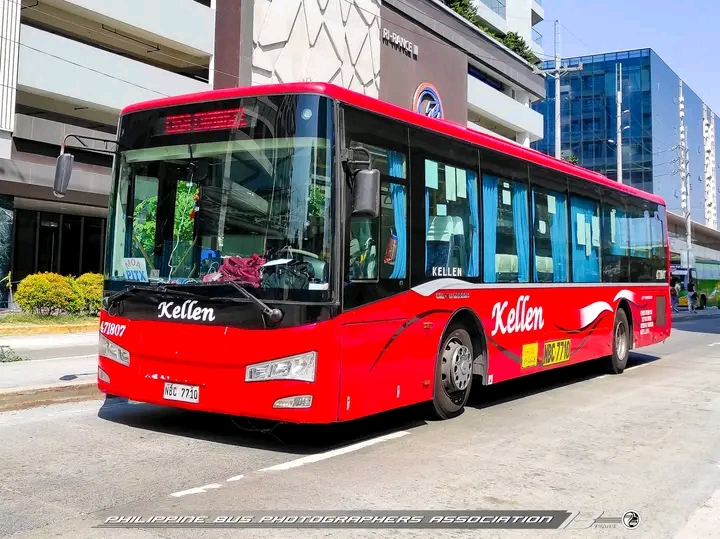
- A Kellen Transport low-floor bus entering PITX.
- Parent: ES Transport
- Founded: 2007
- Headquarters: San Jose del Monte, Bulacan, Philippines
- Service area: EDSA Carousel route, under the ES Consortium
- Service type: City Operation
- Fleet: 200+ Buses (Yutong, King Long, Golden Dragon) [including ES Transport, Earth Star Express, Jell Transport]
- Operator: Kellen Transport Inc.

Kellen Transport Incorporated or simply KTI is a city bus company formed as a subsidiary of former Jell Transport, Inc. or JTI. It plies the previous routes from Baclaran, Parañaque to Grotto, San Jose del Monte, Bulacan. Now they operating in EDSA Carousel route under the ES Consortium. It's a subsidiary of ES Transport Inc., which a parent company operates both city and provincial operations.

== Etymology ==
The bus company is derived from its founder and operator, Elena San Pedro Ong, in which the bus company was formed. She is also the operator of former Jell Transport Inc., which plies the previous route Alabang-SM Fairview. and now also operating in EDSA Carousel route under the same consortium.

== History ==
Kellen Transport was established in 2007 as a new sister company of former Jell Transport, Inc. (JTI). Some of JTI buses were transferred to Kellen Transport (KTI), retaining the Baclaran-SM Fairview route before it expanded the route to Grotto, San Jose del Monte, Bulacan. It started with UD Trucks, Isuzu, and Japayuki units before refleeted into King Long air-conditioned units. In the same year, ES Transport has formed its provincial operation for Northern Luzon route, particularly in Nueva Ecija.

When Jell Transport's franchise was revoked in 2010 by the Land Transportation Franchising and Regulatory Board (Philippines) due to involvement in many road accidents along EDSA and Commonwealth Avenue, the company decided to sell other assets, and later bought JKJ Transit Express Corp., a bus company previously operated by CHER Transport Corp., plying the same route, and later continued to buy other franchises, of which Pascual Liner Inc. was another bus company that was chosen, but this time, for Alabang-Novaliches route using the same livery but of different color. They also formed a new bus company known as Earth Star Express, plying Baclaran-Quiapo-SM Fairview route, but the route has changed upon revocation of Jell Transport franchise and now plies route from Sta. Cruz, Manila to Sapang Palay, San Jose del Monte, Bulacan via NLEX Malinta Exit Novaliches SM Fairview.

Kellen Transport continued their operations at present. In 2013, its sister company, ES Transport, has restored its city operation, and added new Yutong units.

== Fleet ==
Kellen Transport maintains and utilizes Golden Dragon, buses with a total of 25 new low floor buses. Additionally, Kellen Transport has roughly more than 100 units from combined ES Transport, Earth Star Express, and JELL Transport (both city and provincial operations) with kinglong, Yutong and Golden Dragon units.

Current Fleet, Including subsidiaries

Kellen Transport

- Golden Dragon XML6125J28C Chuanliu

Jell Transport

- Golden Dragon XML6125J28C Chuanliu

Earth Star Express

- Golden Dragon XML6125J28C Chuanliu

ES Transport

- Golden Dragon XML6125J28C Chuanliu
- Golden Dragon XML6102 Splendour

Former Fleet, including subsidiaries

Kellen Transport
Dongfeng

- DHZ6111CF

Isuzu

- Isuzu LT132 (Partex Body)

King Long

- XMQ6117Y
- XMQ6996

Yutong

- ZK6107HA

Jell Transport
Hino

- Hino FG1J (Hino Philippines V24R)

Isuzu

- Isuzu FTR (Almazora City Star)
- Isuzu FVR (Almazora City Star)

UD Trucks (Formerly Nissan DIesel)

- UD Condor (Santa Rosa EXFOH)

Earth Star Express
Daewoo

- BM090 Royal Midi

Golden Dragon

- XML6102 Splendor

Hino

- Hino RK1JST (Partex Body)

Kia

- Kia Granbird

King Long

- XMQ6101Y

== Routes ==
- EDSA Carousel (PITX - Monumento)
- VGC - North EDSA (SM North - Valenzuela Gateway Complex) Only operated by subsidiary ES Transport.

== Subsidiaries ==
- JKJ Express Corp. – former sister company of CHER Transport Corp., now operated under Earth Star Express and Agila Bus Transport
  - Alabang-Lagro/SM Fairview via EDSA Commonwealth Avenue*
  - Angat, Bulacan-Baclaran via EDSA Ayala NLEX Bocaue Exit Norzagaray Sta. Maria***
  - Angat, Bulacan-Cubao/Farmers via EDSA NLEX Bocaue Exit Norzagaray Sta. Maria
  - Angat, Bulacan-Divisoria, Manila via NLEX Bocaue Exit Norzagaray Sta. Maria operated by Agila Bus Transport
- ES Transport
  - Metro Manila
    - Baclaran, Parañaque**
    - Bagong Silang, Caloocan**
    - SM Fairview, Quezon City**
    - Cubao, Quezon City
    - Sampaloc, Manila
    - Pasay Rotonda, Pasay
    - Avenida, Santa Cruz, Manila**
  - Provincial destinations
    - Cabanatuan, Nueva Ecija via, NLEX, or SCTEX La Paz, Tarlac City
    - Tabuk, Kalinga via SCTEX La Paz and TPLEX Victoria Exit, Munoz, San Jose, Bayombong, Solano, Santiago, San Mateo, Cabatuan, Roxas, Isabela
    - Tungkong Mangga, San Jose del Monte, Bulacan**
    - Sapang Palay, San Jose del Monte, Bulacan** via Malinta Exit, Novaliches Bayan, SM Fairview & Grotto/Tungko, Marilao Exit or via Bocaue Exit, Guyong-Catmon-Bulac, Santa Maria, Bulacan**
- Earth Star Express
  - Avenida, Santa Cruz, Manila-Sapang Palay, San Jose del Monte, Bulacan** via NLEX Valenzuela/Malinta Exit, Novaliches, SM Fairview, Tungkong Mangga, Quirino Highway
  - Avenida, Santa Cruz, Manila-Sapang Palay, San Jose del Monte, Bulacan** via NLEX Bocaue Exit
  - SM Fairview-Baclaran/PITX via Quezon Avenue, Quiapo, Lawton, Taft Avenue
  - SM Fairview-Alabang via EDSA, Commonwealth Avenue*

(*) denotes this has been a previous route of former Jell Transport Inc., but now operated under JKJ Express and Earth Star Express

(**) denotes these terminals are under city operation

(***)denotes that some units of JKJ were repainted as Shanine & Pauline Transport but these are still operated by JKJ Express

== Gallery ==
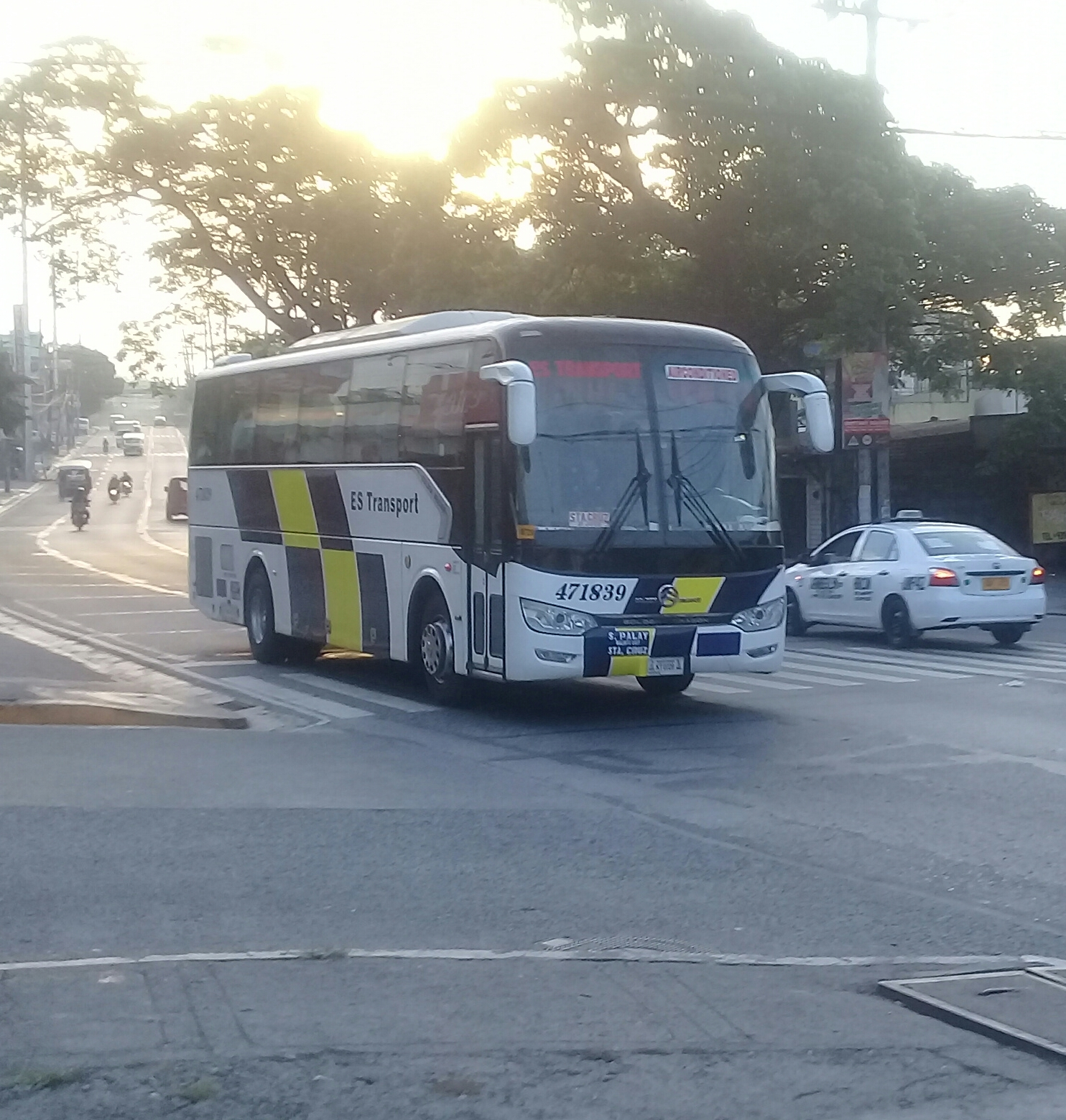
ES Transport Operated Golden Dragon XML6102 Splendour

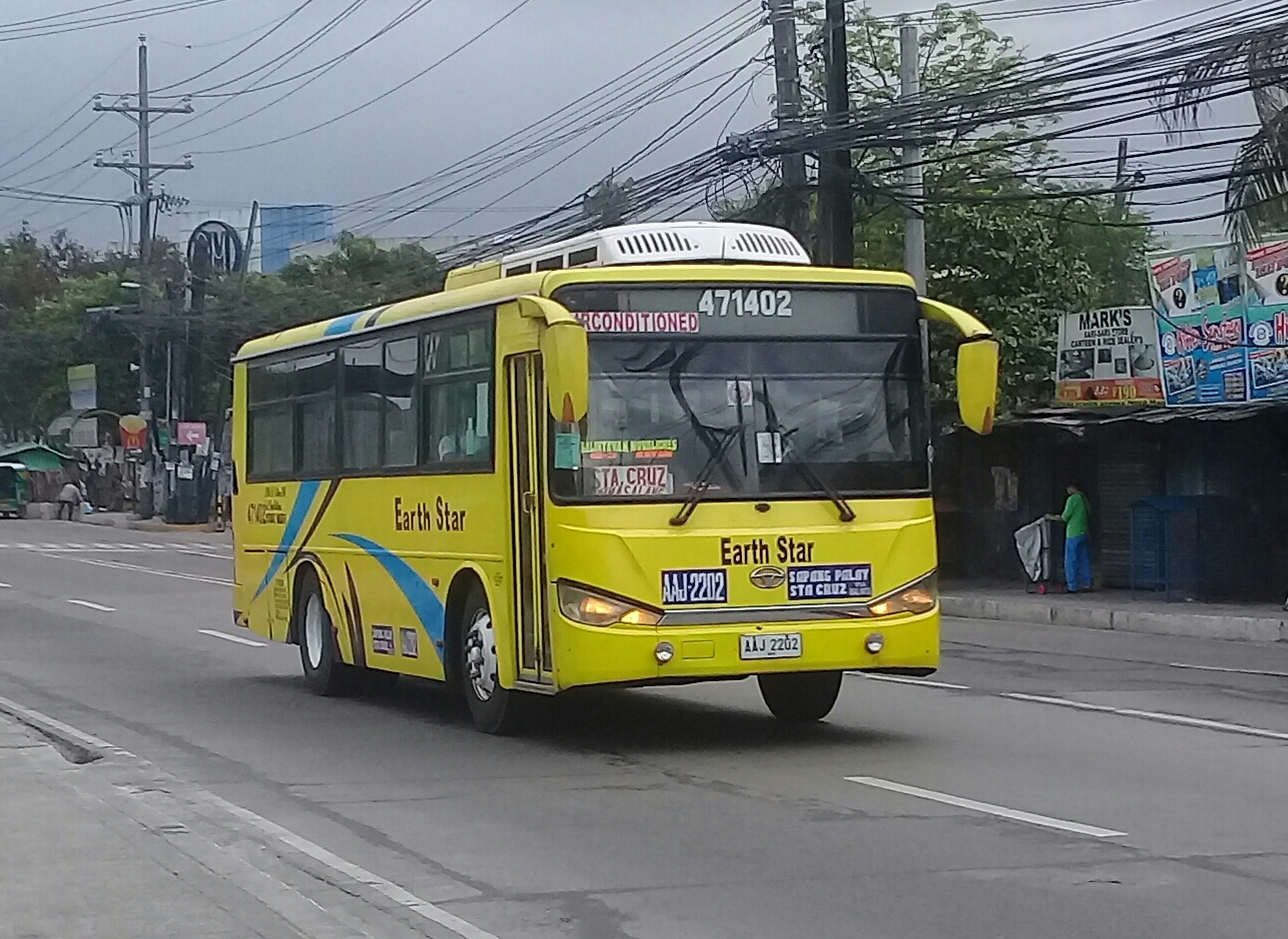
Daewoo BM090 Royal Midi formerly operated by Earth Star Express.

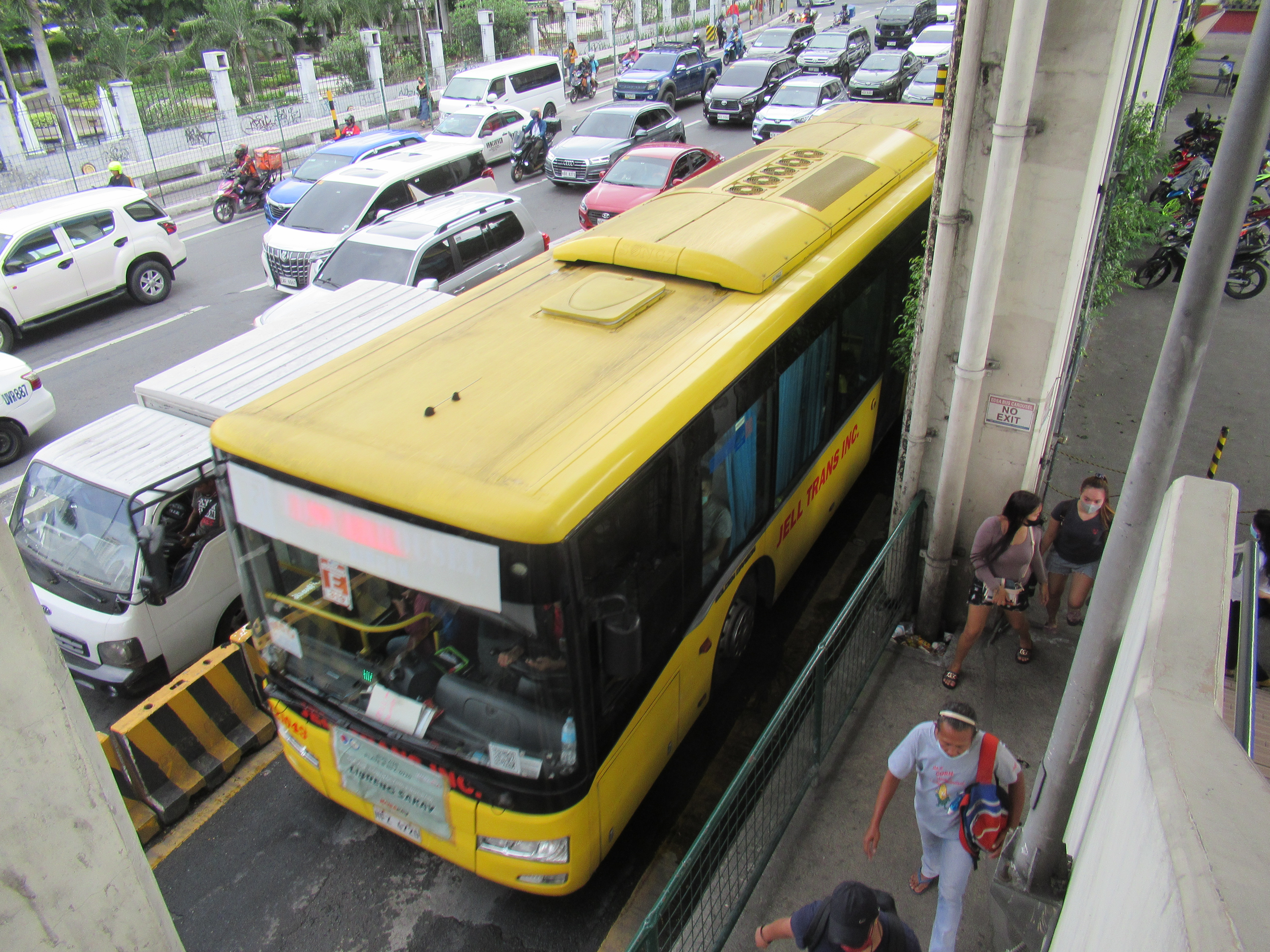
Jell Trans Operated Golden Dragon XML6125J28C Chuanliu

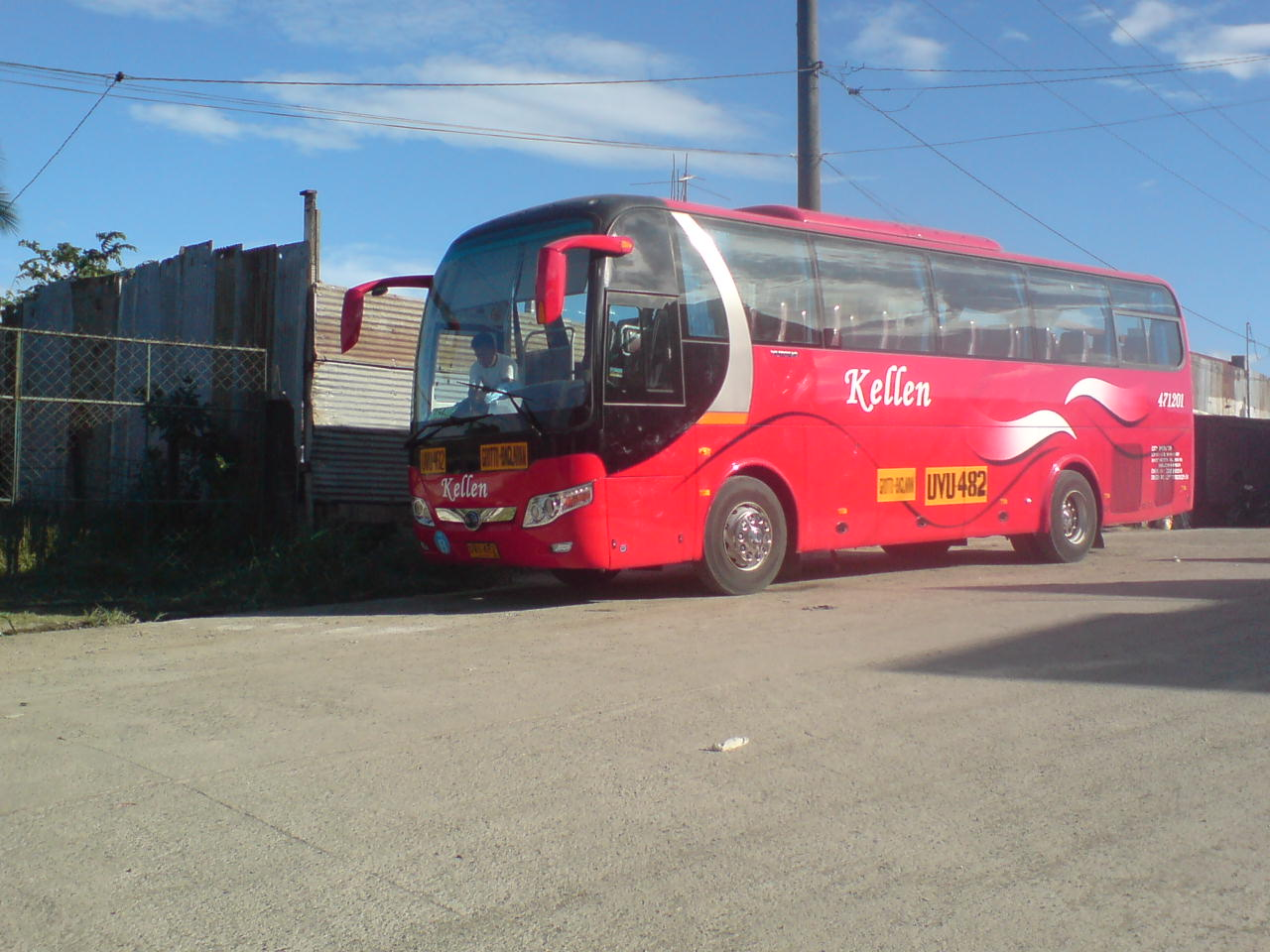
Yutong ZK6107H formerly operated by Kellen Transport.

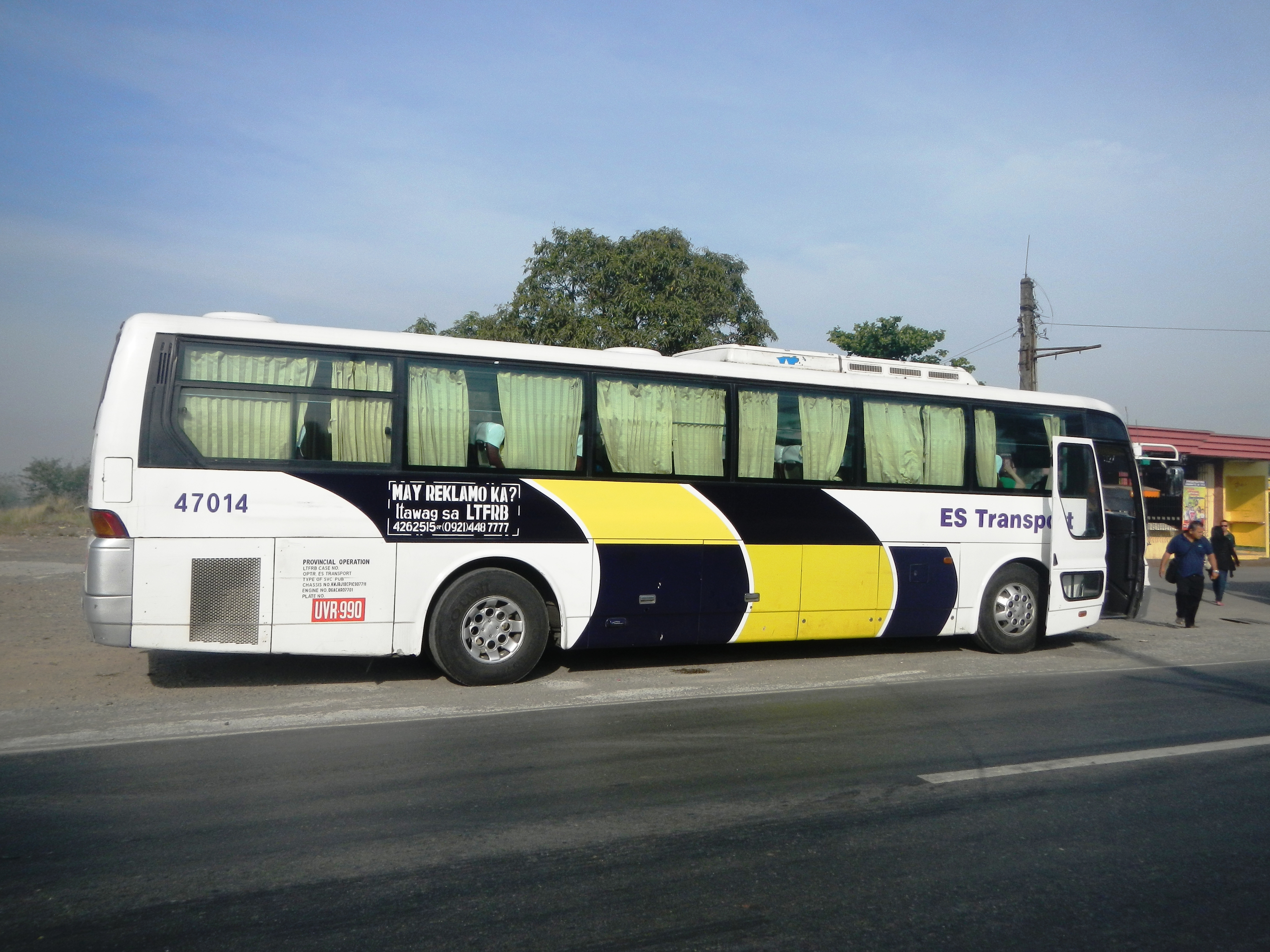
Hyundai Aero Space formerly operated by ES Transport.
