= Kellyn =

Kellyn is a given name that may refer to:

- Kellyn Acosta (born 1995), American soccer player
- Kellyn Beck, designer of video game Defender of the Crown
- Kellyn George, Dominican medical researcher
- Kellyn Morris (born 1989), Australian actress and singer
- Kellyn Plasschaert (1958–2009), American actress
- Kellyn Tate (born 1976), American softball coach
- Kellyn Taylor (born 1986), American distance runner
