= Callen =

Callen may refer to:

- Callen, Landes, France
- Callan, County Kilkenny, Ireland; also spelled Callen
- Callen Point, a promontory in the Maine, United States

== People ==
=== Given name ===
- Cal Tjader (1925–1982), full name Callen Tjader, Latin jazz musician

=== Surname ===
- Bryan Callen (born 1967), American actor on MADtv
- Herbert Callen (1919–1993), American physicist and textbook author
- Ian Callen (born 1955), Australian cricketer
- Maude E. Callen (1898–1990), rural nurse and midwife in South Carolina
- Michael Callen (1955–1993), American musician and AIDS activist
- Sylvia Callen (fl. 1937–1960), Chicago communist from the 1930s

=== Characters ===
- G. Callen, the lead character on NCIS: Los Angeles

== See also ==
- Callan (disambiguation)
- Kallen, a given name and surname
