= Karlen =

Karlen or Karlén is a surname. Notable people with the surname include:

== Given name ==
- Karlen G. Adamyan (1937–2026), Armenian cardiologist
- Karlen Asieshvili (born 1987), Georgian rugby union player
- Karlen Avetisyan (1940–2004), Armenian painter and restorer
- Karlen Mkrtchyan (born 1988), Armenian footballer
- Karlen Varzhapetyan (1942–1984), Soviet Armenian director of television plays

== Karlen surname ==
- Arno Karlen (1937–2010), American poet, psychoanalyst, and popular science writer
- Gabriel Karlen (born 1994), Swiss ski jumper
- Gaëtan Karlen (born 1993), Swiss footballer
- Gregory Karlen (born 1995), Swiss footballer
- Heinrich Karlen, C.M.M. (1922–2012), Swiss Prelate of Roman Catholic Church
- Jean-Philippe Karlen (born 1972), Swiss footballer
- John Karlen (1933–2020), American actor
- Jonathan Karlen (born 1999), American politician
- Neal Karlen (fl. 1991 – 2013), American journalist and non-fiction writer
- René Karlen (born 1907 – unknown), Swiss basketball player

== Karlén surname ==
- Barbro Karlén (1954–2022), Swedish writer
- Maude Karlén (born 1932), Swedish gymnast
- Vibjörn Karlén (1937–2021), Swedish geologist

== See also ==
- Carlen (surname)
- Kallen
- Karlyn
- Kaulen
