= Keijo Kajantie =

Finnish theoretical physicist

Keijo Olavi Kajantie
- Born: January 31, 1940 (age 86)
- Education: University of Helsinki
- Known for: Electroweak interaction Strong interaction High-energy nuclear physics
- Awards: Finnish Academy of Science Award (2008); Order of the Lion of Finland (2012)
- Scientific career
- Fields: Physics
- Workplaces: Helsinki Institute of Physics; University of Helsinki; CERN
- Doctoral advisor: Gunnar Källén

Keijo Olavi Kajantie (born 1940) is a Finnish theoretical physicist and Professor and Adjoint Scientist at the Helsinki Institute of Physics. He was Professor of Physics at the University of Helsinki from 1973 to 2008. From 1985 to 1990 he was a Research Professor of the Academy of Finland and he has worked in the CERN Theory Division. He is best known for his contributions to the study of the electroweak and strong interactions at high temperatures, as well as to the field of ultrarelativistic nuclear collisions. His research interests include ultrarelativistic nuclear collisions, finite temperature field theory, string theory and QCD matter, cosmological phase transitions and null infinity in general relativity.

== Honours and awards ==
Kajantie was awarded the Finnish Academy of Science Award in 2008 and the Order of the Lion of Finland in 2012.
