= Torsten Gustafson =

- Born: 8 May 1904; Falkenberg, Sweden
- Died: 27 May 1987 (aged 83); Lund, Sweden
- Scientific career
- Fields: Physics
- Workplaces: Lund University
- Thesis: Über den Magnuseffekt nach der asymptotischen hydrodynamischen Theorie (1933)
- Doctoral students: Gunnar Källén

Torsten Valdemar Gustafson (8 May 1904 – 27 May 1987) was a Swedish physicist and professor in theoretical physics at Lund University.

== Biography ==
Torsten Gustafson was born on 8 May 1904 in Falkenberg, Sweden. After graduating from his high school in Gothenburg he began studying at Lund University in 1922. He was awarded his bachelor's degree after three semesters in 1923, and in 1924 he was awarded his Master of Philosophy. In 1929, he became a Filosofie licentiat with his work on flow problems in airplane wings, and in 1934 he was awarded his Doctor of Philosophy with his doctoral dissertation on Magnus effect. In 1933, he became a lecturer in mechanics and mathematical physics in Lund; in 1939, he became professor in the same subject, and in 1961 he became professor of theoretical physics.

Gustafson's research focus was first mechanics, and especially flow mechanics with aerodynamics and oceanography applications. During his time as a PhD student, he worked as an assistant in the Swedish Hydrographic-Biological Commission in 1930–1934. Later he was mainly involved in nuclear physics.

Torsten Gustafson was acquainted with the Swedish prime minister Tage Erlander, and he served as Erlanders Informal Scientific Adviser during Erlander's time as Education minister and prime minister. In this capacity, Gustafson had an important role in the process which led Sweden to be early to focus on nuclear research in the form of the Atomic Committee, where Gustafson was a member.

He was also a member of the Council of CERN in Geneva in 1953–1964. Gustafsson was elected in 1940 as a member of the Physiographic Society in Lund, in 1951 as a member of the Science Society in Uppsala and in 1958 as a member of the Royal Swedish Academy of Sciences.
