= Mousercise =

- Genre: Exercise; Children's television
- Presented by: Kellyn Plasschaert
- Country of origin: United States
- Original language: English
- No. of episodes: 60

Production
- Production company: The Walt Disney Company

Original release
- Release: April 18, 1983 – 1996

Mousercise was an exercise children's television series which aired on The Disney Channel from 1983 to 1996. Inspired by the success of a 1982 exercise album for children released by Disneyland Records, featuring various Disney songs, the show debuted on The Disney Channel on April 18, 1983, when the channel launched and was one of the channel's first programs. The series featured Kellyn Plasschaert, along with Mickey Mouse and other Disney characters exercising with a group of kids. It also featured Steve Stark in a segment about health and safety. During the end credits, Steve would join Kellyn and the kids while exercising. The show continued to run until 1996.

== Spin-offs ==
The show was itself a spin-off of a 1982 album entitled Mousercise, which included music from previous Disney releases intended for exercising; the album was recorded by Clarence Nash, and former Miss Hawaii Teri Ann Linn promoted the album in live appearances. The success of the show spawned a 1985 video release based on the TV series. A different exercise album for children was released in 2005 by Walt Disney Records, also entitled Mousercise. In 2016, Mousercise was advertised in Japan, featuring updated themes including Disney's Frozen.
