= Kelan =

Kelan may refer to:

== People ==
- Kelan Luker (born 1980), American football player, musician and football coach
- Kelan Martin (born 1995), American baseball player
- Elisabeth Kelan, British scholar on gender relations in organisations

== Places ==
- Kelan County, Shanxi Province, China
- Kelan River, Xinjiang, China

== See also ==
- Kellan, a given name and surname
- Kelen (disambiguation)
- Kolanı (disambiguation), several places in Azerbaijan
