= Calan =

Calan may refer to

== Places ==
- Calan, Morbihan, Brittany, France, a town
- Călan, Hunedoara County, Romania, a town

== People ==
- Alline Calandrini, known as Calan (born 1988), Brazilian footballer
- Calan Williams (born 2000), Australian racing driver

== Other uses ==
- Calan (band), a Welsh band
- Calan, a trade name for the drug Verapamil

== See also ==
- Kalan (disambiguation)
