= Kyren (name) =

Kyren is a given name. Notable people with the name include:

- Kyren Lacy (2000–2025), American football player
- Kyren Paris (born 2001), American baseball player
- Kyren Taumoefolau (born 2003), Tongan rugby union player
- Kyren Williams (born 2000), American football player
- Kyren Wilson (born 1991), English snooker player

== See also ==
- Amari'i Kyren Bell, English and Jamaican footballer
- Kyrin Galloway (born 1999), American-Australian basketball player
- Cyrene (mythology)
