= Van der Kellen =

van der Kellen is a surname. Notable people with the surname include:

- David van der Kellen Sr. (1764–1825), Dutch engraver
- David van der Kellen Jr. (1804–1879), Dutch engraver, son of former
- David van der Kellen Jr.(III) (1827–1895), Dutch painter, son of former

== See also ==
- Wilberd van der Kallen (born 1947), Dutch mathematician
