= Camp Callan =

US Army training during World War II in California

- La Jolla, California, U.S.

Site information
- Type: anti-aircraft artillery and coastal artillery replacement training center
- Controlled by: United States Army

Location
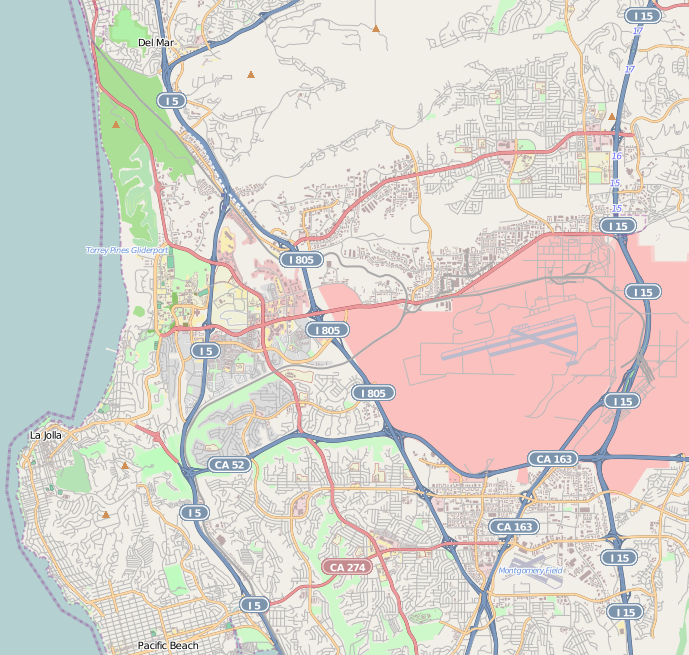
- Location within Northwestern San Diego Location within San Diego County, California Location within California Location within the United States
- Coordinates: 32°52′57″N 117°14′45″W

Site history
- Built: November 1940
- In use: January 15, 1941 – November 1, 1945

Camp Callan was a United States Army anti-aircraft artillery replacement training center that was operational during World War II. It was located on the southern West Coast of the United States, in the La Jolla community of San Diego, California. The facility was closed shortly after the war ended and few traces of the base remain.

== Location and current use ==
Camp Callan was located near U.S. Highway 101, about 15 miles (24 km) north of downtown San Diego in the La Jolla area. It occupied a roughly rectangular piece of land approximately 3 miles (5 km) north-to-south and 0.5 miles (0.8 km) east-to-west. This land is on the Torrey Pines Mesa and is near the Pacific Ocean.

The northern portion of the former base is today the 36-hole Torrey Pines Golf Course complex, opened in 1957, and Torrey Pines State Natural Reserve. The southeastern portion is now part of the University of California, San Diego, campus. The rest of the southern portion of the former base includes private land (both residential and commercial), the Scripps Green Hospital and research institutes such as the Salk Institute for Biological Studies. This portion of the former base is in the vicinity of present-day Genesee Avenue and North Torrey Pines Road.

== History ==
=== Acquisition ===
On October 9, 1940, the San Diego City Council leased the U. S. military 710 acres (2.87 km^{2}) of land for a nominal one dollar per year. The city council also leased an additional 0.90 acres (3,640 m^{2}) to the military. Margaret C. Hawkins leased the military 120.08 acres (0.49 km^{2}) and F.T. Scripps, Inc. leased them 72.12 acres (0.29 km^{2}). The military acquired 367.00 acres (1.49 km^{2}) by revocable permit from the city council and 12.85 acres (0.05 km^{2}) by license from the city council. Altogether, 1,282.95 acres (5.19 km^{2}) of land for the base was authorized for acquisition by the government.

=== Early period of operation ===
On November 22, 1940, the War Department announced plans to create a replacement training center for coast artillery units in the Torrey Pines Mesa area. Men inducted into the military under the Selective Service Program would be assigned to this new training center. The purpose of this training center was to teach trainees how to fire long-range weapons in the event the Imperial Japanese Navy tried to attack the West Coast of the United States. This training center was named "Camp Callan" in honor of Major General Robert Emmet Callan, a distinguished Coast Artillery officer. Construction of the base began in November 1940 and official occupation of the camp was marked by a military flag-raising ceremony that took place on January 15, 1941. Twenty officers and one hundred and twenty enlisted men were present. They were all members of the first unit of operations personnel at the new base. Brigadier General Francis P. Hardaway was the new camp's first commander. He spoke on the importance of the camp to the defense program at this ceremony. On February 24, 1941, the first large guns arrived at the camp. Nine of these guns were French-made 155 mm guns that dated back to World War I. Around five thousand trainees arrived at the camp between the last week of February and the end of March. They arrived by rail at a nearby reopened railroad station. The first trainees came mostly from Fort Ord and Fort MacArthur in California, Fort Sheridan in Illinois, Fort Missoula in Montana and Vancouver Barracks in Washington. The first military review was held on April 2, 1941. Six thousand men passed in formation before Major General Joseph A. Green, Chief of Coastal Artillery. He congratulated them on the progress they had made in such a short time. Since the camp did not have its own military band, a 100-piece Marine Corps band provided music for this ceremony.

=== Middle period of operation ===
A period of significant change for the camp began in March 1942. The military had seen the terrible damage the Luftwaffe had inflicted on the United Kingdom so they decided to place full training emphasis on anti-aircraft weapons rather than on a combination of seacoast artillery and anti-aircraft weapons. This change marked the beginning of a two-year period of peak activity for the camp. Approximately fifteen thousand trainees were going through their training during each thirteen-week training cycle. Training ranges on the base included a 1,000-inch range, a 200-yard rifle range, a pistol range, an automatic weapons range and a 3-inch anti-aircraft gun range. The trainees learned to use 155 mm, 90 mm, 75 mm, and 40 mm caliber guns as well as the associated fire control equipment. Gun firing positions were established for this training. In addition to artillery gun positions and small arms ranges, a variety of other facilities and structures were built on the base. These improvements included barracks and cantonments, a 910-bed station hospital, offices, five Post Exchanges, three theaters, five chapels, support buildings, storage buildings and a landfill. In all, the developed part of the base covered twenty-three blocks and had over 297 buildings at this time. Various living amenities were provided for the health, general education and war training schooling of the trainees, much like other Army camps of the time. A weekly newspaper called The Range Finder and an annual pictorial review called The Callander were published at the camp. The camp eventually got its own 40-piece military band as well.

=== Late period of operation ===
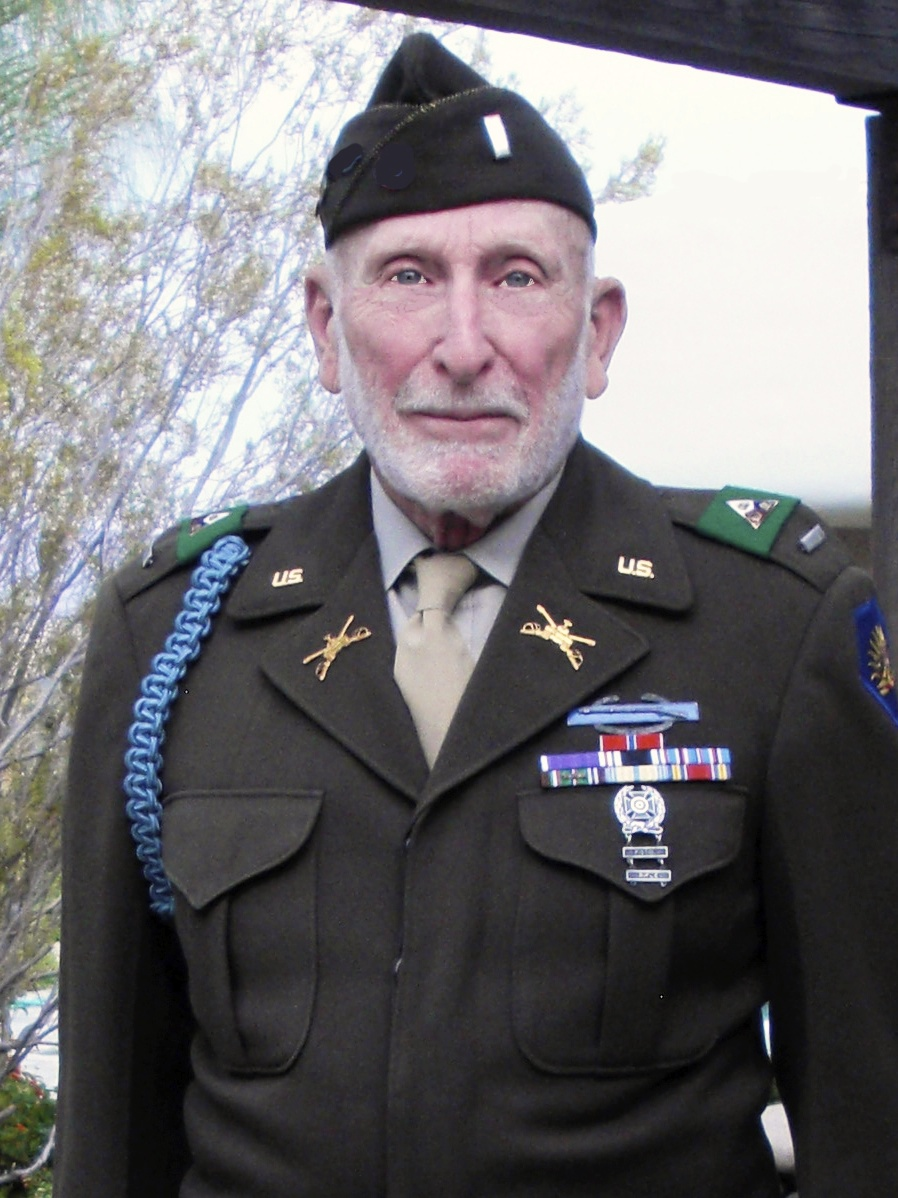
Lt. Donald Prell wearing his WWII U.S. Army uniform in 2009

In the last group of recruits attending Coast Artillery basic training at Camp Callan, was Donald Prell, who in June 1944, graduated from OCS at Ft. Benning, GA. In June 1944, the training emphasis at the camp was again to change. The anti-aircraft training program was transferred to Fort Bliss in Texas, and the camp assumed an important role in preparations for massive overseas amphibious assaults. However, this period of camp activity was short-lived. By May 8, 1945, the war was over in Europe and by August 15 the Japanese had surrendered. Because of these changes, this training was no longer needed. On November 1, 1945, Camp Callan was declared surplus.

=== Disposal ===
After the camp was declared surplus, the land it was on was disposed of over the course of a year. 710 acres (2,900,000 m^{2}) and an additional 0.90 acres (3,600 m^{2}) of leased land was cancelled on March 25, 1946. 120.08 acres (485,900 m^{2}) of leased land was cancelled on August 9, 1946. 72.12 acres (291,900 m^{2}) of leased land was cancelled on June 30, 1946. 367.00 acres (1,485,200 m^{2}) of permit land was cancelled on December 13, 1945. 12.85 acres (52,000 m^{2}) of licensed land was cancelled on March 25, 1946. The land under permit was released in lieu of restoration clause. The landfill was not on the permit land.

=== After closing ===
At the time the camp closed, Southern California was facing a shortage of lumber and building materials. This problem was made worse because many veterans chose to stay in San Diego after the war. In order to mitigate this problem, the San Diego City Council negotiated with the War Department to acquire most of the buildings and facilities of the camp (which numbered around five hundred at the time the camp closed). The selling price was $200,000. These material were then resold to veterans and other citizens at reasonable prices. Several thousand homes, several churches and many utilities were constructed from this material. The city recouped its $200,000 investment and made a $250,000 profit on these sales. Part of this profit went to build the Veteran's War Memorial Building in Balboa Park. Today, almost all evidence of improvements or buildings built on the former base during its existence (except the landfill) have disappeared. A few foundations remain in the area to the north of the UC San Diego campus. The old main entrance of the base is at The Lodge Torrey Pines off of Torrey Pines Road.
