= Kellyn Plasschaert =

American actress

- Born: Kellyn Lillian Plasschaert; November 26, 1958; Los Angeles, California, US
- Died: April 30, 2009 (aged 50); Santa Clarita, California, US
- Occupation: Actress
- Years active: 1982–1996

Kellyn Lillian Plasschaert (November 26, 1958 – April 30, 2009) was an American actress.

Born in Los Angeles, California she was the daughter of Alex Edward Plasschaert, a stuntman and choreographer. Her hometown was Northridge, California.

Plasschaert was the hostess of the children's television series Mousercise. In addition to the TV program, she made personal appearances with the show's crew at a children's hospital. Although Plasschaert was associated with the exercise series, she considered herself to be "primarily an actress". Programs on which she appeared included Concrete Jungle, Days of Our Lives, and Fantasy Island. She made commercials, including those for Kodak, McDonald's, the National Milk Board, and Tropical Blend. She taught both private fitness classes and classes at fitness centers.

Plasschaert's residence was in Canyon Country, California. Plasschaert died from cancer on April 30, 2009. She was cremated.

== Filmography ==
| Year | Title | Role | Notes |
|---|---|---|---|
| 1983-1996 | Mousercise | Herself; Host | Entire series |
| 1985 | Jane Fonda's New Workout | Herself | |
| 1986 | Alfred Hitchcock Presents | Receptionist | 1 episode, "The Creeper" |
| 1986-1987 | Simon & Simon | Jane Thomas | 3 episodes; 2 in 1986 and 1 in 1987 |
