= Arvid Emanuel Kallen =

Arvid Emanuel Kallen (July 24, 1895 – April 1969) was a General Motors executive until his retirement in 1959.

== Background ==
Arvid Emanuel Kallen was born in Öland, Sweden. He came to the United States from Sweden in 1915 intending to study medicine. The charity of friends provided train fare to Chicago where his industrial career began. He attended Carolina K. Kalmar college, Sweden; Northwestern University, and DePaul University. Kallen served in the United States Army during World War I as a translator.

== Career ==
In 1928 when the Yellow Coach Manufacturing Company, of which he was president, was purchased by General Motors, he was named treasurer of the division and later president of what became the GM Truck & Coach Division. Although GM continued with the Yellow Coach product line, the Yellow Coach badge gave way to the GM nameplate in 1944.

Kallen was the Director of the Recess Club; Treasurer, Vice president, and President of Oakland Hills Country Club; a Member of The Swedish Club of Chicago; and an Honorary member of the New York City Bankers Club. He died in Boynton Beach, Florida
