= McKellen =

McKellen is an Irish surname originating in 11th century AD, derived from the Irish surname Mac Uighilín (son of Hugelin) Anglicized as McQuillan. Notable people with the surname include:

- Gordon McKellen (born 1953), American figure skater
- Ian McKellen (born 1939), English actor
