= USNS General H. H. Arnold =

Transport ship, built 1944

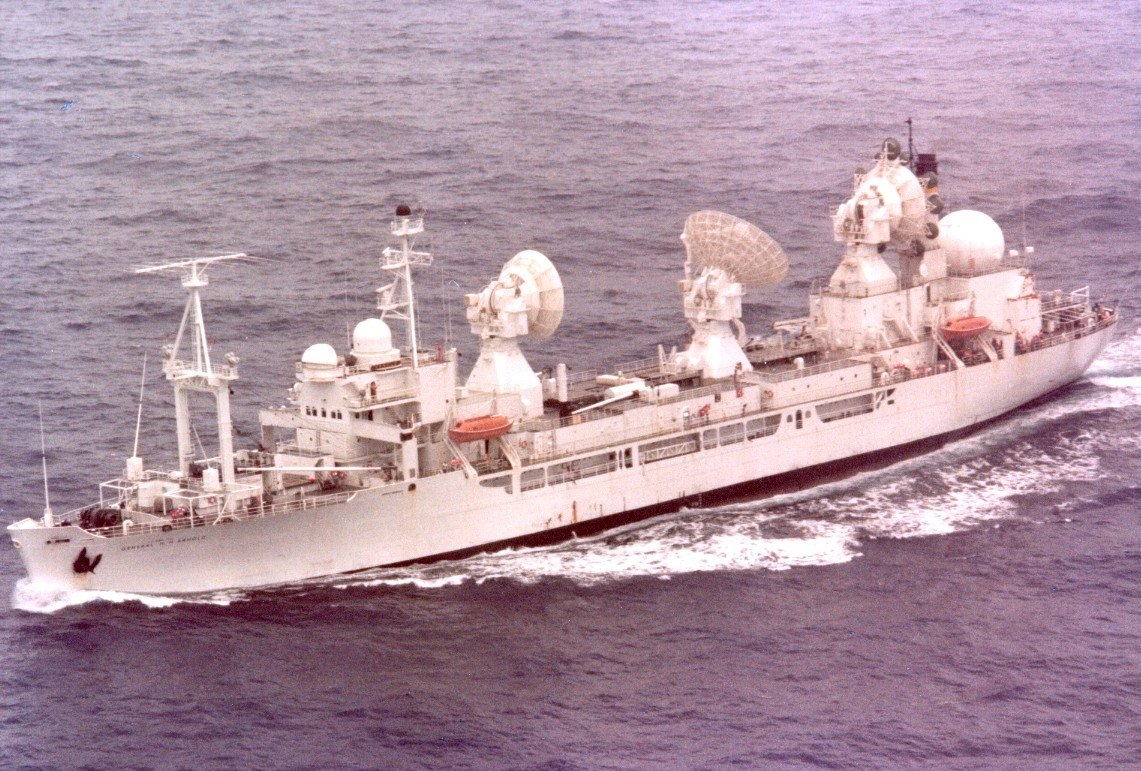
- USNS General H. H. Arnold (T-AGM-9) ex-USS General R. E. Callan (AP-139)

History

United States
- Name: General R. E. Callan; General H. H. Arnold
- Namesake: Robert Emmet Callan (1944–1963); Henry H. Arnold (1963–)
- Builder: Kaiser Co., Inc.; Richmond, California
- Laid down: date unknown
- Launched: 27 April 1944
- Acquired: 7 July 1944
- Commissioned: 17 August 1944
- Decommissioned: 24 May 1946
- In service: after 19 June 1946 (Army); 28 April 1950 (MSTS); 15 July 1961 (USAF); 1 July 1964 (MSTS)
- Out of service: 28 April 1950 (Army); 29 May 1958 (MSTS); 1 July 1964 (USAF); before 1 March 1982 (MSTS)
- Renamed: General H. H. Arnold
- Reclassified: T-AP-139, 28 April 1950
- Stricken: 19 June 1946 as General R. E. Callan; 1 March 1982 as General H. H. Arnold

General characteristics
- Class & type: General G. O. Squier-class transport ship
- Displacement: 9,950 tons (light), 17,250 tons (full)
- Length: 522 ft 10 in (159.36 m)
- Beam: 71 ft 6 in (21.79 m)
- Draft: 26 ft 6 in (8.08 m)
- Propulsion: single-screw steam turbine with 9,900 shp (7,400 kW)
- Speed: 17 knots (31 km/h)
- Capacity: 3,823 troops
- Complement: 449 (officers and enlisted)
- Armament: 4 × 5"/38 caliber gun mounts; 4 × 40 mm AA gun mounts; 16 × 20 mm AA gun mounts

USNS General H. H. Arnold (T-AGM-9) (originally named USS General R. E. Callan (AP-139)) was a General G. O. Squier-class transport ship for the U.S. Navy in World War II. She was named in honor of U.S. Army general Robert Emmet Callan. She was transferred to the U.S. Army as USAT General R. E. Callan in 1946. On 28 April 1950 she was transferred to the Military Sea Transportation Service (MSTS) as USNS General R. E. Callan (T-AP-139). Placed in reserve in 1958, she was transferred to the U.S. Air Force in 1961 and renamed USAFS General H. H. Arnold in 1963, in honor of Henry H. Arnold, the first and only General of the Air Force. She was reacquired by the Navy in 1964 as USNS General H. H. Arnold (T-AGM-9). She was struck from the Naval Vessel Register on 1 March 1982.

== Operational history ==
=== Transport ship ===
International radio call sign of General R. E. Callan
November	Alpha	Papa	Delta

General R. E. Callan (AP-139) was launched 27 April 1944 under a Maritime Commission contract (MC #667) by Kaiser Inc., Richmond, California sponsored by Mrs. Robert E. Callan, wife of General Callan; acquired 7 July 1944; and commissioned 17 August 1944.

General R. E. Callan sailed from San Francisco 25 September 1944 with Army troops and debarked them at Oro Bay and Langemak Bay, New Guinea, on-loading at the latter port 2,700 troops and casualties which she put ashore at San Francisco 1 November on her return. She embarked over 2,600 fighting men at San Diego and after touching San Francisco 13 November, got underway from that port 3 days later for Kahului Harbor, Hawaii, where she debarked the troops and returned to San Francisco 2 December with over 250 homeward-bound veterans. From 20 December 1944 – 8 February 1945 the transport carried 2,500 troops from San Francisco to Eniwetok and Guam, returning to Los Angeles the latter date with 2,500 troops embarked at Pearl Harbor. General R. E. Callan then stood out 23 March 1945 with more than 3,000 fighting men bound for Melbourne, Australia; Calcutta, India; and Trincomalee, Ceylon; returning via Fremantle, Australia; Manus, Tinian, Saipan, Guam, and Pearl Harbor to moor at San Francisco 28 June.

Two days later the busy ship steamed under the Golden Gate bound for Norfolk, closing that port 15 July and getting underway again 25 July for France. She embarked over 3,000 troops at Marseille 6 August and returned to Norfolk 18 August to debark her war-weary passengers. From 20 August-12 September the ship made another voyage to Marseille and put in at Boston 12 September with over 4,000 troops. On 26 September she stood out to eastward, touching Karachi, India, via the Suez and returning to New York with a full load of veterans on 21 November. After a round-the-world troop rotation cruise which brought the ship to Karachi, Singapore and Hawaii after her departure 7 December 1945 from New York, General R. E. Callan moored at Seattle on 30 January 1946. Following a voyage to Leyte, she returned to San Francisco in early April, and subsequently sailed thence via Panama for Boston, where on 24 May 1946 she was placed out of commission and turned over to the Maritime Commission for peacetime operations as an Army transport. Her name was struck from the Navy List on 19 June 1946.

In September 1947 General R. E. Callan and sister ship General Harry Taylor put in at Todd Shipyard, Brooklyn for limited modifications. The changes were so the ships would be in compliance with United States Coast Guard requirements for commercial passenger carriers.

In January 1948 USAT General R. E. Callan responded to a distress signal from Army Transport Joseph V. Connolly which was burning at 39°48′N 54°37′W, some 890 nautical miles (1,650 km; 1,020 mi) east of New York. Freighters Union Victory and Black Diamond each picked up a lifeboat, while General R. E. Callan picked up the remaining two boats. The Army transport stayed with the burning hulk of Joseph V. Connolly until being relieved by Army ocean-going tug LT-788. General R. E. Callan was ordered to Halifax with the survivors. All 46 hands from Joseph V. Connolly were saved by the three ships, while the ship itself was lost.

General R. E. Callan was reacquired from the Army on 28 April 1950 and crewed by the Civil Service for transatlantic passenger service under the MSTS until 29 May 1958 when her name was again struck from the Navy List. Returned to the Maritime Commission, she was assigned to the Maritime Defense Reserve Fleet in the Hudson River, New York.

=== Missile range instrumentation ship ===
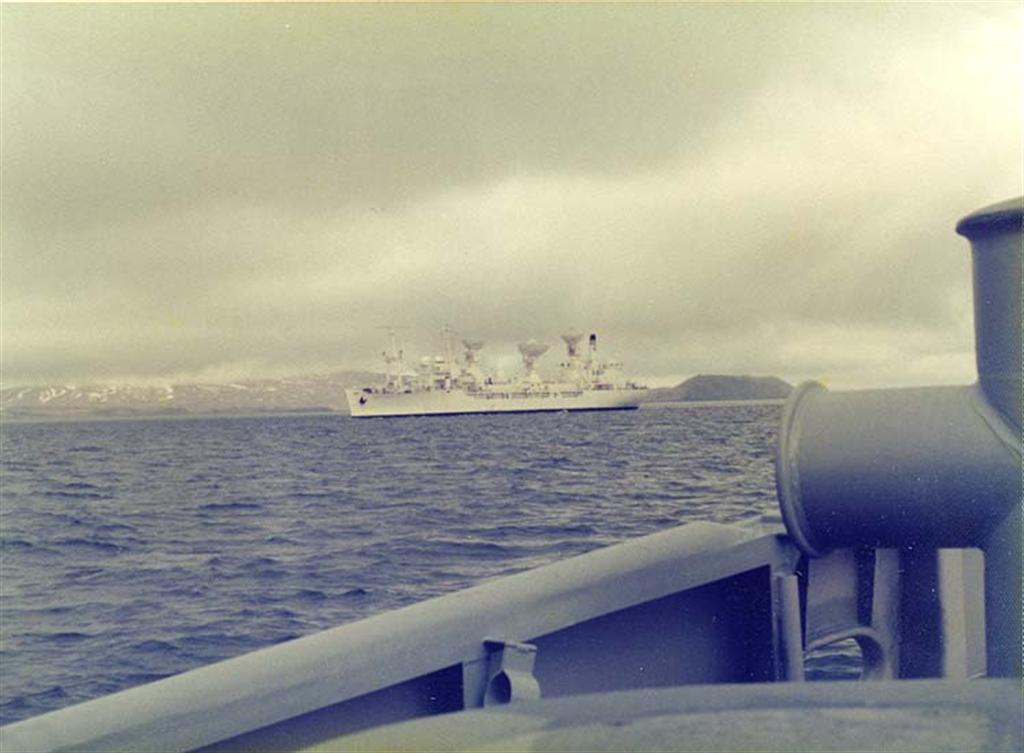

General R. E. Callan was transferred to the Air Force 15 July 1961, and rebuilt at Bethlehem Shipbuilding, Brooklyn as a missile range instrumentation ship. She was renamed USAFS General H. H. Arnold in honor of General of the Air Force Henry H. Arnold and designated as ORV-1908. On 1 July 1964 she was acquired by the Navy and designated T-AGM-9. General H. H. Arnold operated in the Atlantic under MSTS as a missile range instrumentation ship. She was also seen operating in the North Pacific during the late 1970s. She was struck from the Naval Vessel Register on 1 March 1982.

The ship was operated by Military Sealift command and had a crew of 200 and supporting contractors and military personnel of approx 50. During the late 1970s and early 1980s RCA Service Corp had the contract for supporting the electronics with a contingent of approx 50 personnel. The RCA personnel operated and maintained the radar equipment. At that time the main computer was a NASA modified 642B mainframe. Supplemental computers were a Univac 1911. The aft dish was a 30 ft Telemetry dish, the 40' midship dish was an X and L band radar capable of tracking a 15-inch sphere to 1500 miles. The L band radar was 8M watts. The 30' forward dish was a C Band radar.

There was an optical 'flexure monitoring system' running from beneath the Ship's Inertial Navigation System (SINS) gyros to beneath the telemetry mount. This system allowed for computer-aided steering of the three antennas to maintain 'target convergence' in compensation for the forces inflicted upon the ship in the roll, pitch and yaw axes by the sea motion. In addition, just behind the bridge and above the ship's navigational gyro was a 'star tracker' system that provided celestial navigation backup, verification and calibration for the SINS. A single-side-band (SSB) radio communication system, visibly represented by two large, vertically oriented antennae located on the forward deck, permitted radio communication to operational centers in the U.S. from virtually anywhere around the globe.

Much (most) of the technical and operational characteristics of the Arnold were replicated on her sister ship, the Gen. Hoyt S. Vandenberg (ORV-1907). Perhaps the most significant difference was in the dual-function radar systems supported on the mid-ships antenna; X and L band on the Arnold, X and UHF band on the Vandenberg.
