= Michael A. Kelen =

Canadian federal judge

Judge of the Federal Court of Canada
- In office July 30, 2001 – June 14, 2012

Personal details
- Born: October 17, 1948 (age 77) Montreal, Quebec

Michael A. Kelen (born October 17, 1948) is a former Canadian judge. He served on the Federal Court of Canada from 2001 until his retirement in 2012.
