= Källén function =

Polynomial function in three variables

The Källén function, also known as triangle function, is a polynomial function in three variables, which appears in geometry and particle physics. In the latter field it is usually denoted by the symbol $\lambda$. It is named after the theoretical physicist Gunnar Källén, who introduced it as a short-hand in his textbook Elementary Particle Physics.

== Definition ==
The function is given by a quadratic polynomial in three variables

$$\lambda(x,y,z) \equiv x^2 + y^2 + z^2 - 2xy - 2yz - 2zx.$$

== Applications ==
In geometry the function describes the area $A$ of a triangle with side lengths $a,b,c$:

$$A=\frac{1}{4} \sqrt{-\lambda(a^2,b^2,c^2)}.$$

See also Heron's formula.

The function appears naturally in the kinematics of relativistic particles, e.g. when expressing the energy and momentum components in the center of mass frame by Mandelstam variables.

== Properties ==
The function is symmetric in permutations of its arguments, as well as independent of a common sign flip of its arguments:

$$\lambda(-x,-y,-z) = \lambda(x,y,z).$$

If $y,z>0$ the polynomial factorizes into two factors

$$\lambda(x,y,z) = (x-(\sqrt{y}+\sqrt{z})^2)(x-(\sqrt{y}-\sqrt{z})^2).$$

If $x,y,z>0$ the polynomial factorizes into four factors

$$\lambda(x,y,z) = -(\sqrt{x}+\sqrt{y}+\sqrt{z})(-\sqrt{x}+\sqrt{y}+\sqrt{z})(\sqrt{x}-\sqrt{y}+\sqrt{z})(\sqrt{x}+\sqrt{y}-\sqrt{z}).$$

Its most condensed form is

$$\lambda(x,y,z) = (x-y-z)^2-4yz.$$

Interesting special cases are

$$\lambda(x,y,y) = x(x-4y)\,,$$
$$\lambda(x,y,0) = (x-y)^2\,.$$
