= Wilberd van der Kallen =

Dutch mathematician

Wilberd Leo Johan van der Kallen (born 15 January 1947 in Nieuwer-Amstel) is a Dutch mathematician.

W. L. J. van der Kallen completed his undergraduate study of mathematics and physics at Utrecht University. There he received his PhD in 1973 with thesis advisor T. A. Springer and thesis Infinitesimally central extensions of Chevalley groups. In 1969 Van der Kallen became a teaching assistant in Utrecht University's Mathematics Department and has spent his career there, eventually becoming a tenured professor. His research deals with algebraic K-theory and the representation theory of algebraic groups, among other topics. He has frequently been a visiting professor at Northwestern University in Evanston, Illinois and at the Tata Institute of Fundamental Research in Mumbai.

He is the author or coauthor of over 60 research articles. In 1977 he published an analogue of a 1977 theorem of Andrei Suslin and a generalization of a 1969 theorem of Hideya Matsumoto. In 1978 Van der Kallen was an invited speaker at the International Congress of Mathematicians in Helsinki. His 1980 paper Homology stability for linear groups has over 200 citations. His 1977 paper Rational and generic cohomology, written with 3 other mathematicians, has over 240 citations.

== Books ==
- van der Kallen, Wilberd (1993). Lectures on Frobenius Splittings and B-modules. ISBN 978-81-85198-60-6; 98 pages
- van der Kallen, Wilberd (15 November 2006). Infinitesimally Central Extensions of Chevalley Groups. Lecture Notes in Mathematics, vol. 356. Springer. ISBN 978-3-540-37857-0; pbk reprint of 1973 original, 154 pages
- Cohen, Arjeh M.; Hesselink, Wim H.; van der Kallen, Wilberd L. J.; Strooker, Jan R., eds. (15 November 2006). Algebraic Groups. Utrecht 1986: Proceedings of a Symposium in Honour of T.A. Springer. Lecture Notes in Mathematics, vol. 1271. Springer. ISBN 978-3-540-47834-8; reprint of 1987 original
