= Tungkong Mangga =

- Barangay
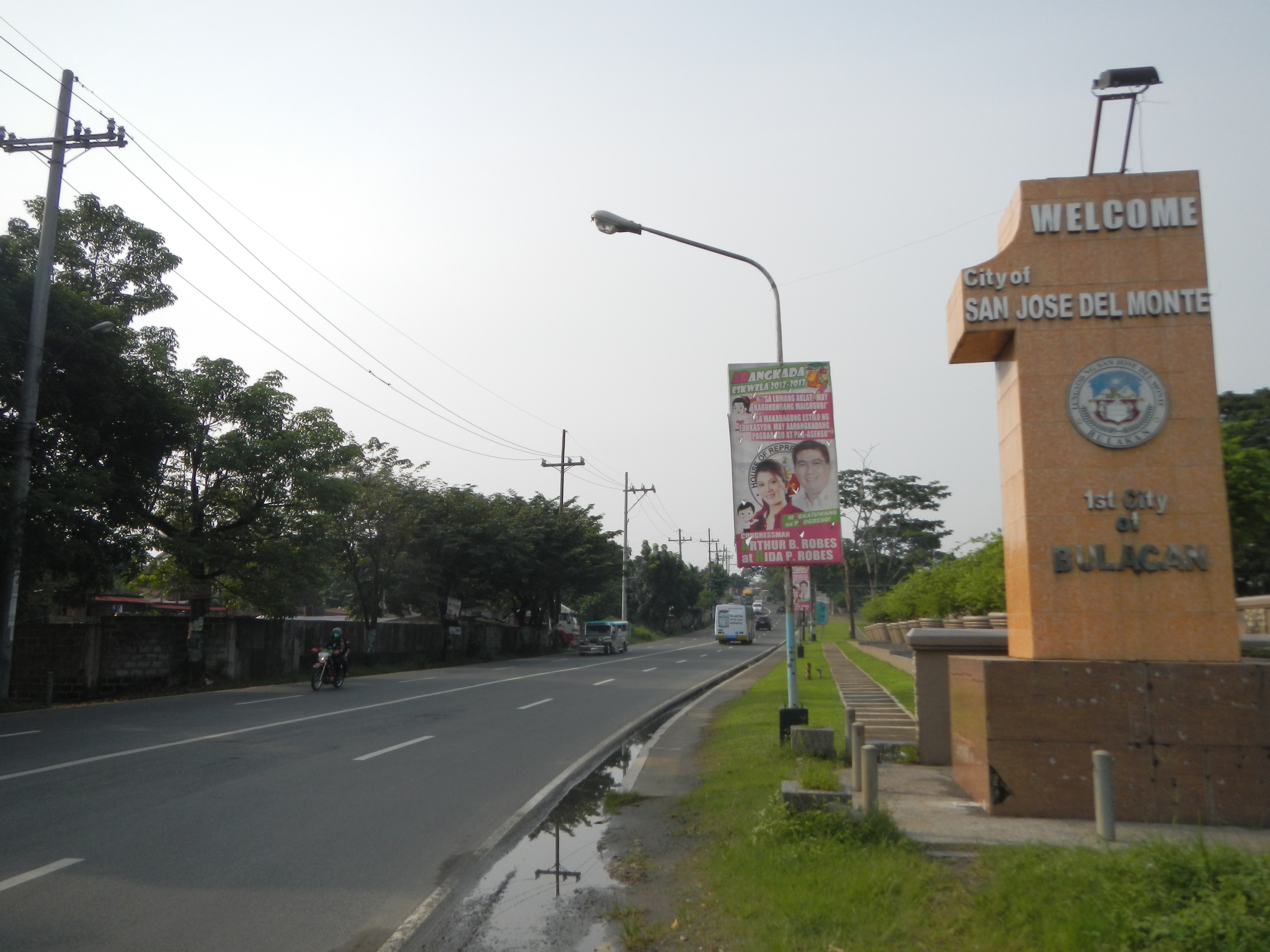
- Welcome marker

- Location within Luzon
- Coordinates: 14°49.10′N 120°57.38′E
- Country: Philippines
- Region: Central Luzon
- Province: Bulacan
- City: San Jose del Monte

Government
  - Type: Barangay
  - Barangay Captain: Alexander "Bong" DS. Medina
- Elevation: 40 m (130 ft)
- Time zone: GMT (UTC+8)
- Zip Code: 3023
- Area code: 044 (Bulacan) / 02 (Manila)

Tungkong Mangga or Tungko (PSGC: 031420011) is one of the fifty-nine barangays comprising the city of San Jose del Monte, Bulacan in the Philippines. It is bordered by Barangay Graceville on the west, Baranggay San Manuel on the south, Barangay Maharlika on the north, and Barangay Santo Cristo on the north-east.

== Geography ==
Tungko Mangga is the largest barangay of San Jose del Monte, Bulacan. It is located in the southern portion of the city and twenty-eight kilometers north from Manila.

== Climate ==
The prevailing climatic conditions in the barangay are categorized into two (2) types: dry and wet season.

The annual mean temperature in the area is 27℃. The warmest month is May with a mean temperature of 29.9℃ while the coldest is January at 25.2℃.

The mean annual relative humidity in the Barangay is 77%. The mean monthly relative humidity is lowest in March at 64% and highest in September at 84%.

== Demographics ==
As of 2007 census, Tungkong Mangga has a population of 8208 people.

== Economy ==
Tungkong Mangga is one of the major commercial business district in the city with primarily wholesale and retail trade businesses. SM City San Jose del Monte is located in Tungko as well as Puregold Tungkong Mangga (formerly Susana Mart) and Savemore Tungkong Mangga.

== Transportation and Communication ==
=== Transportation ===
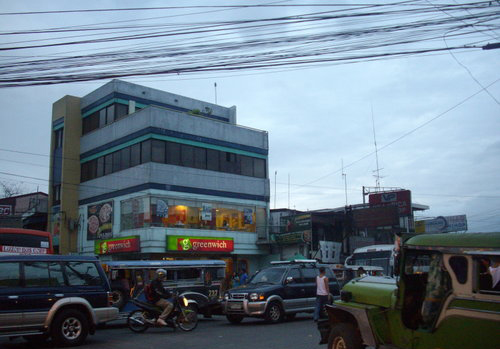
Quirino Highway

Public vehicles such as buses, jeepneys, and tricycles are the means of transportation in the barangay and available for 24 hours. The major roads in the barangay are Quirino Highway and Fortunato F. Halili Avenue Extension (also known as Santa Maria–Tungkong Mangga Road).

== Notable Landmarks ==
=== Historical bridge ===
Tungkong Mangga's bridge is the site where Katipuneros passed by during the Spanish Regime, headed by General Emilio Aguinaldo.

=== Los Arcos de Hermano ===
Los Arcos de Hermano is the main resort in the Barangay (in the lush greens of Paradise Farms).

== Gallery ==
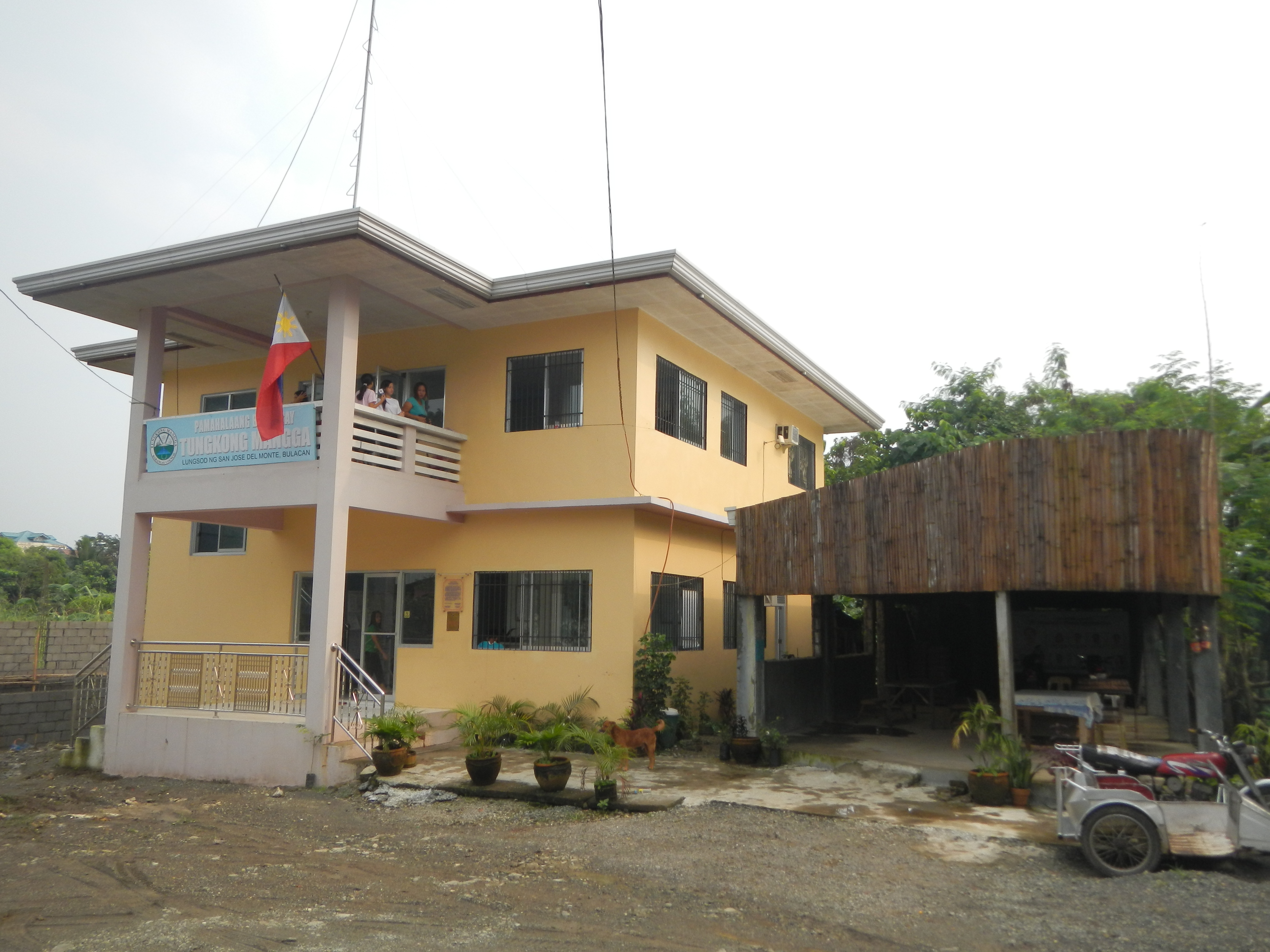
Barangay hall

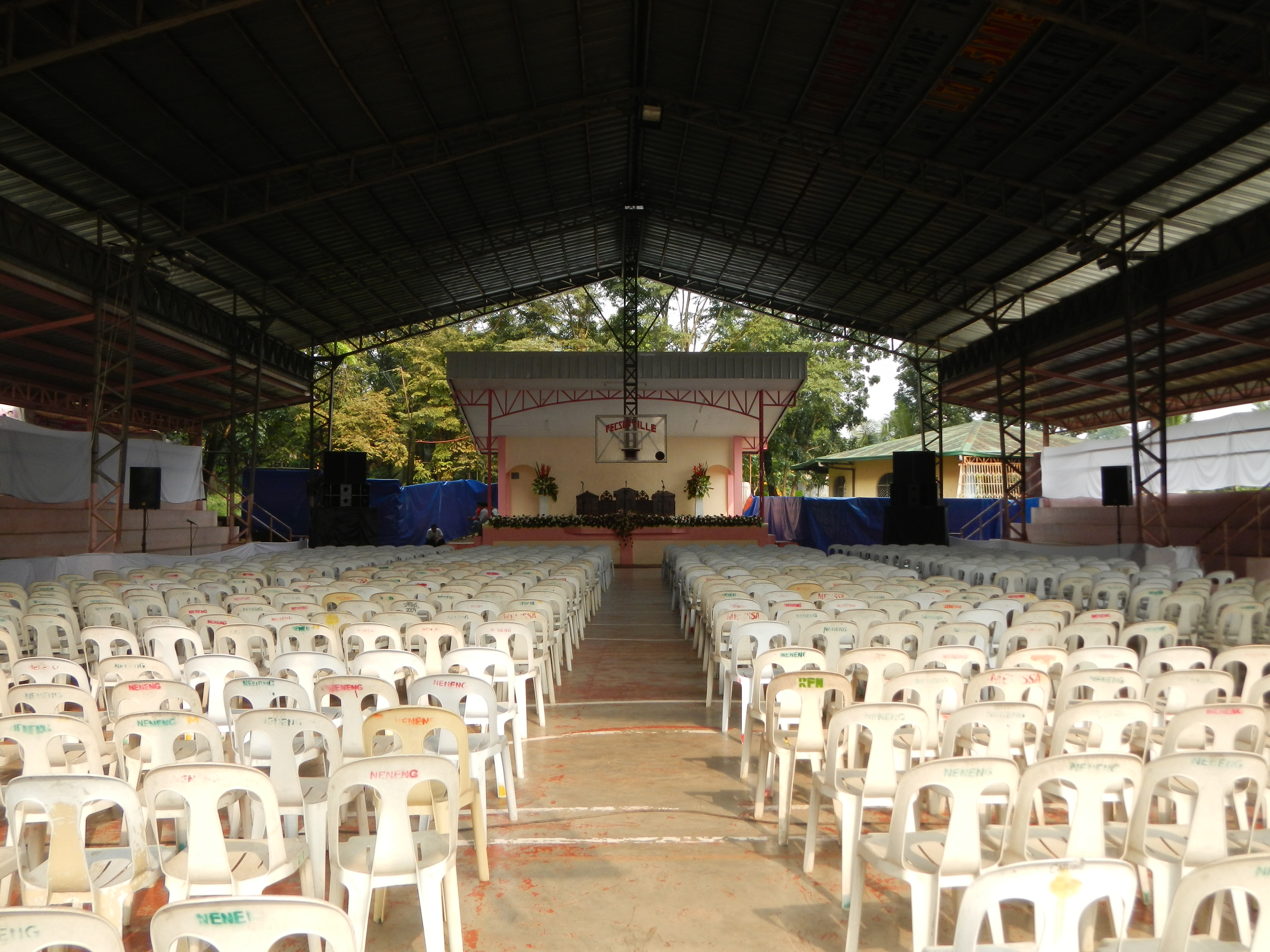
Covered court, gymnasium of the Barangay

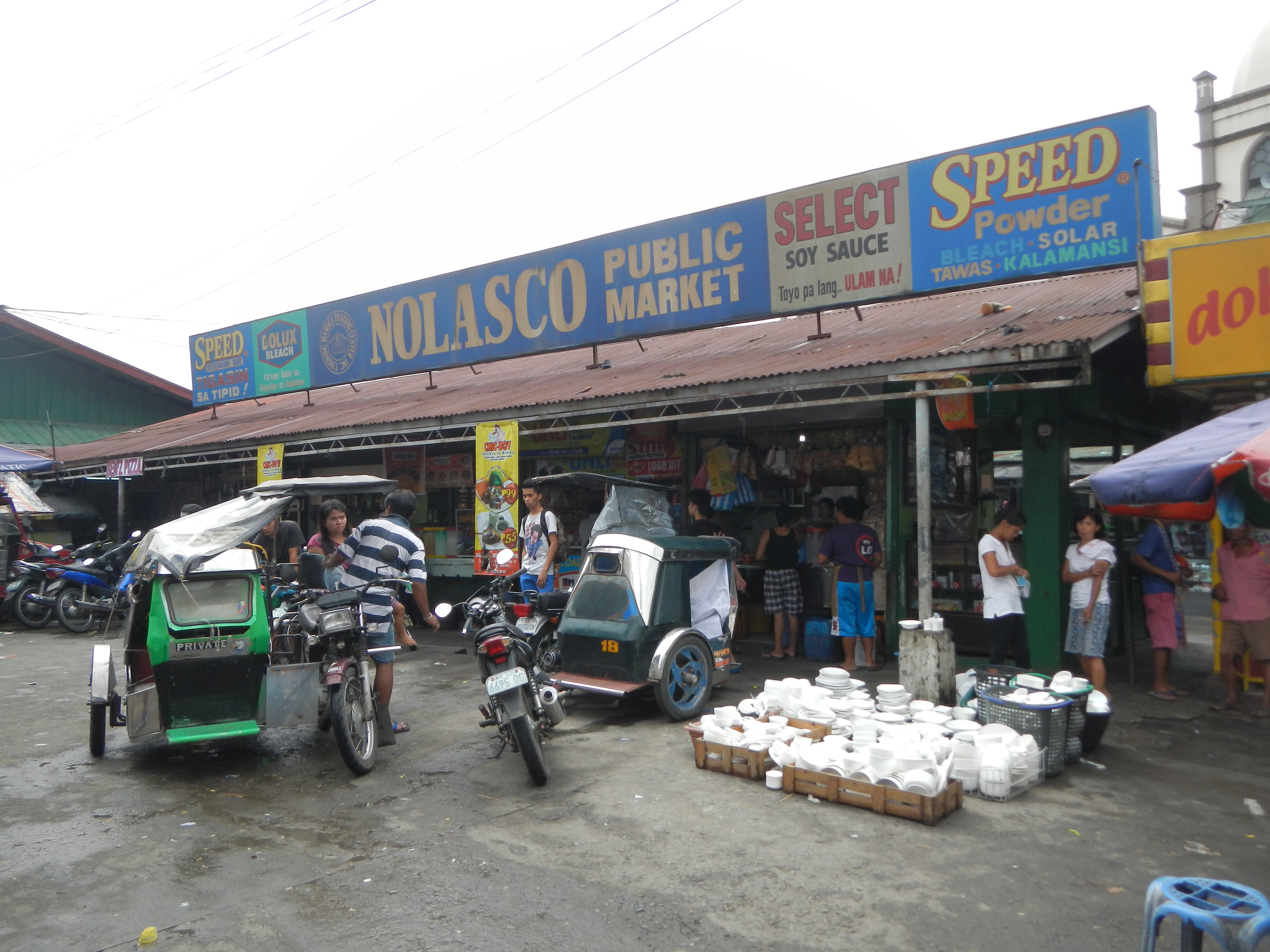
Nolasco Public Market

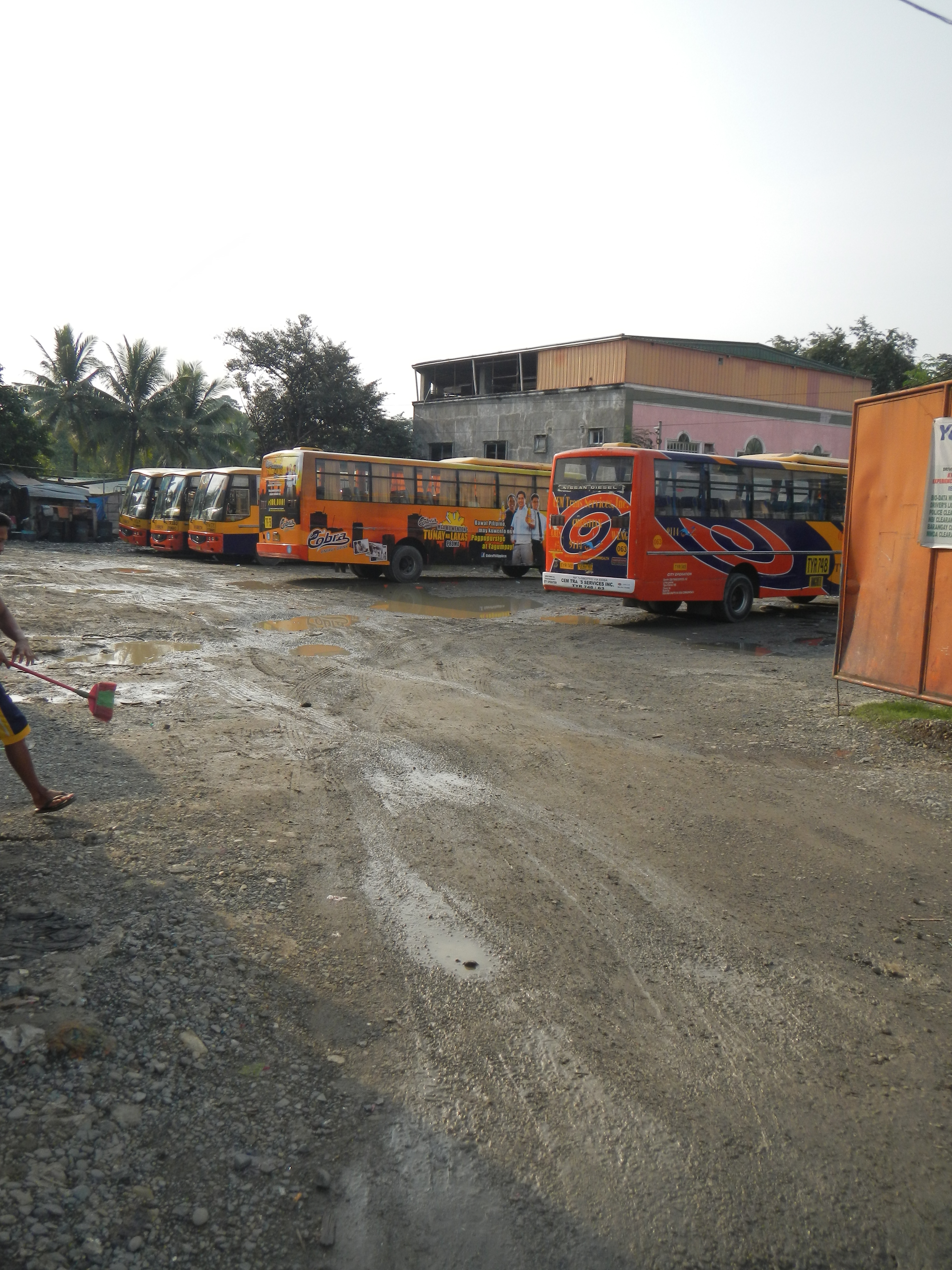
CEM Trans Services, Inc. Bus stop

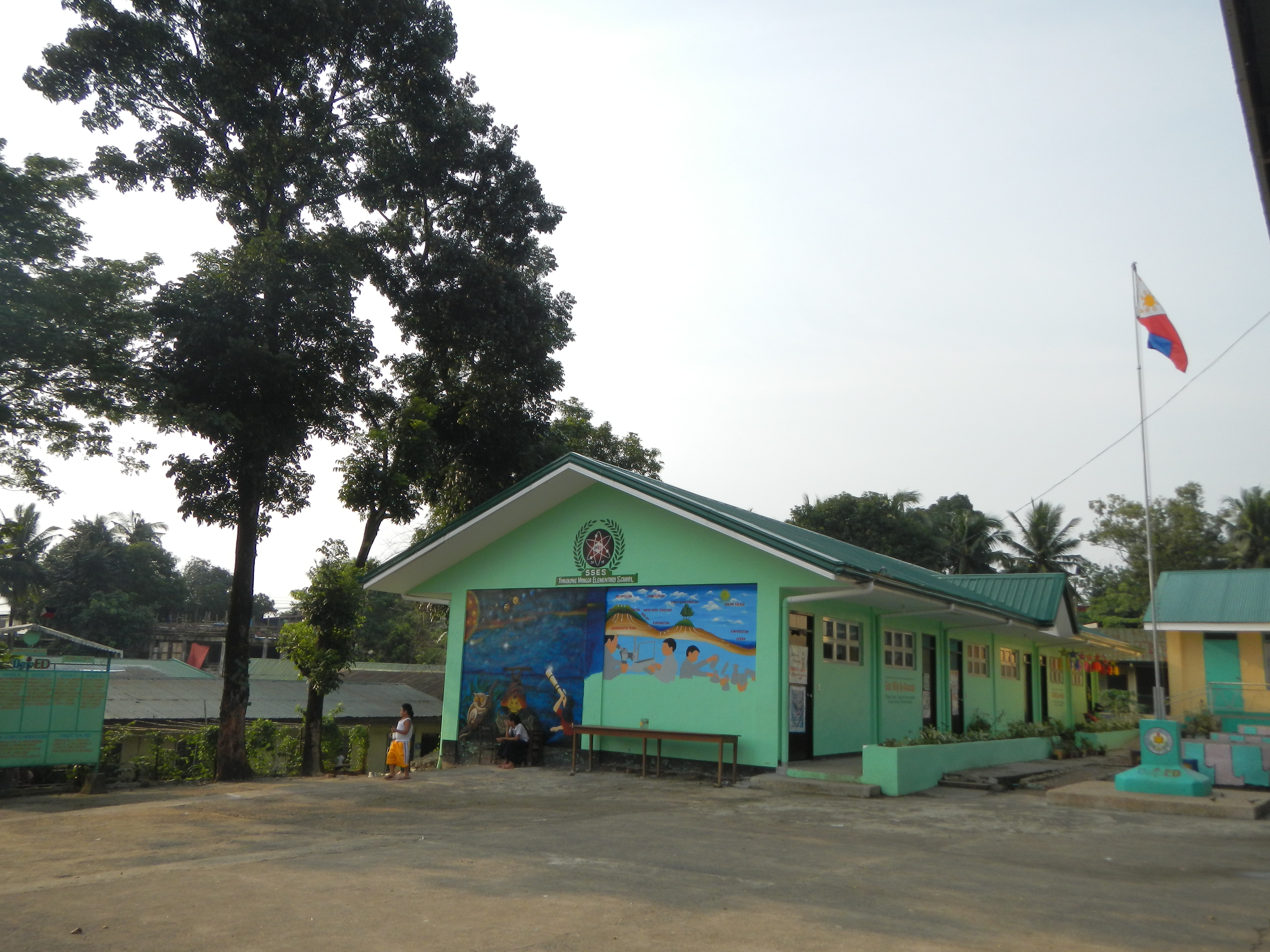
Tungkong Mangga Elementary School

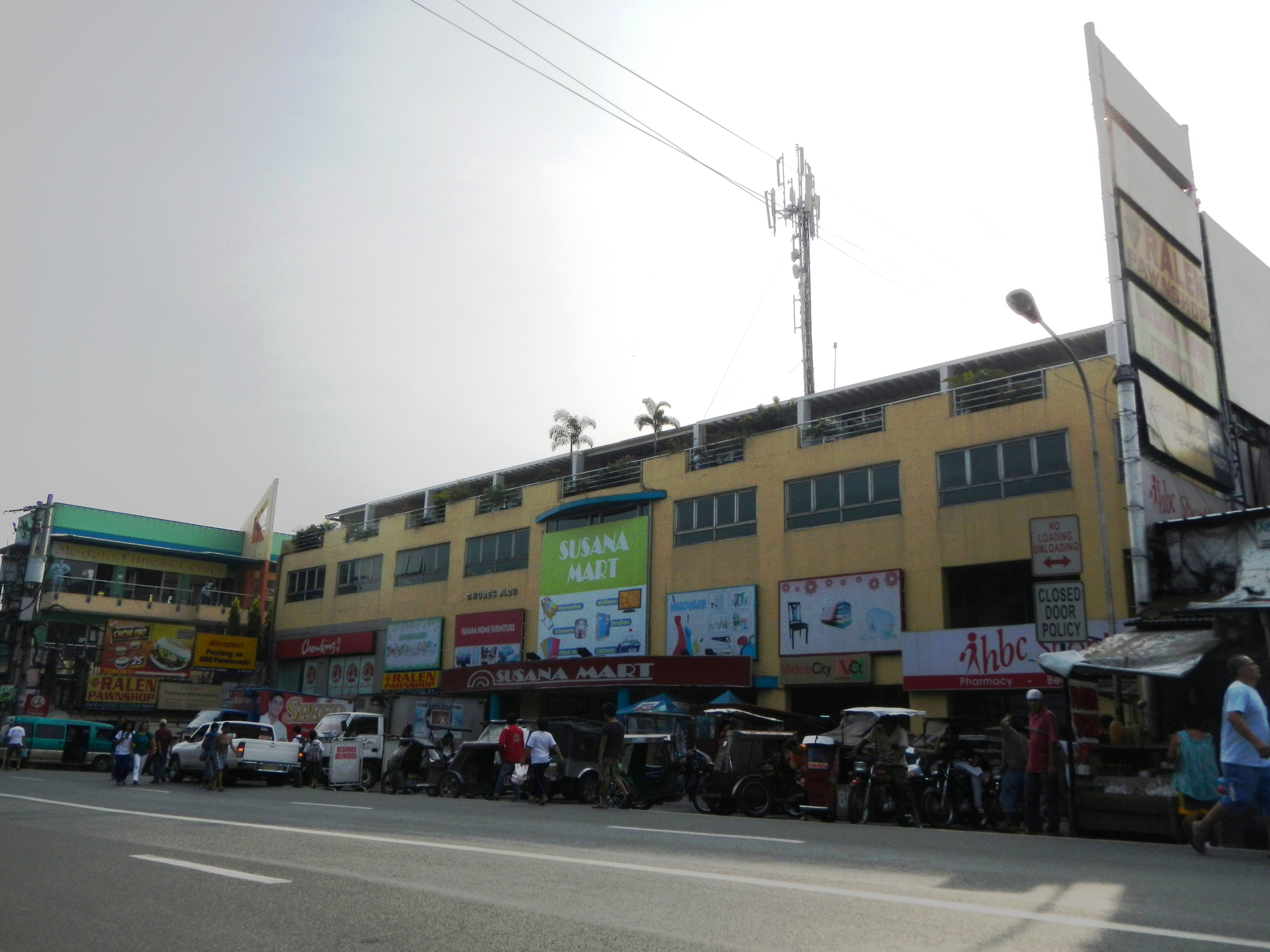
Susana Mart (now Puregold Tungkong Mangga)

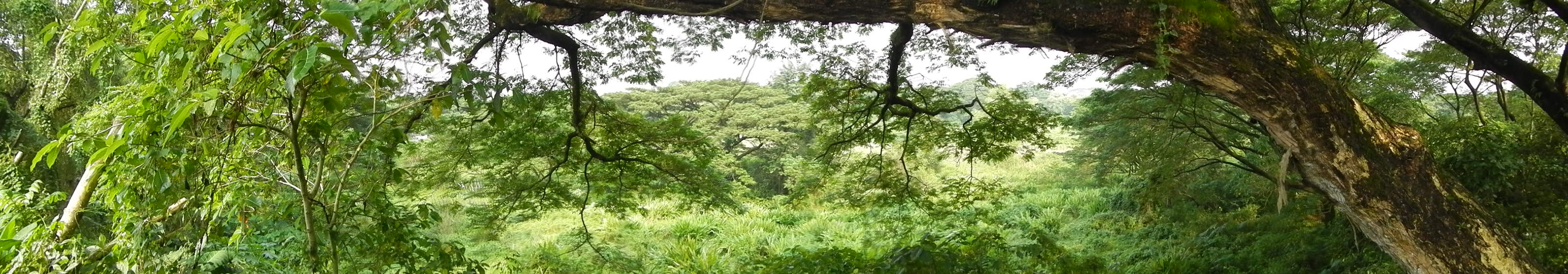
Lush greens (view in front of Susana Mall)

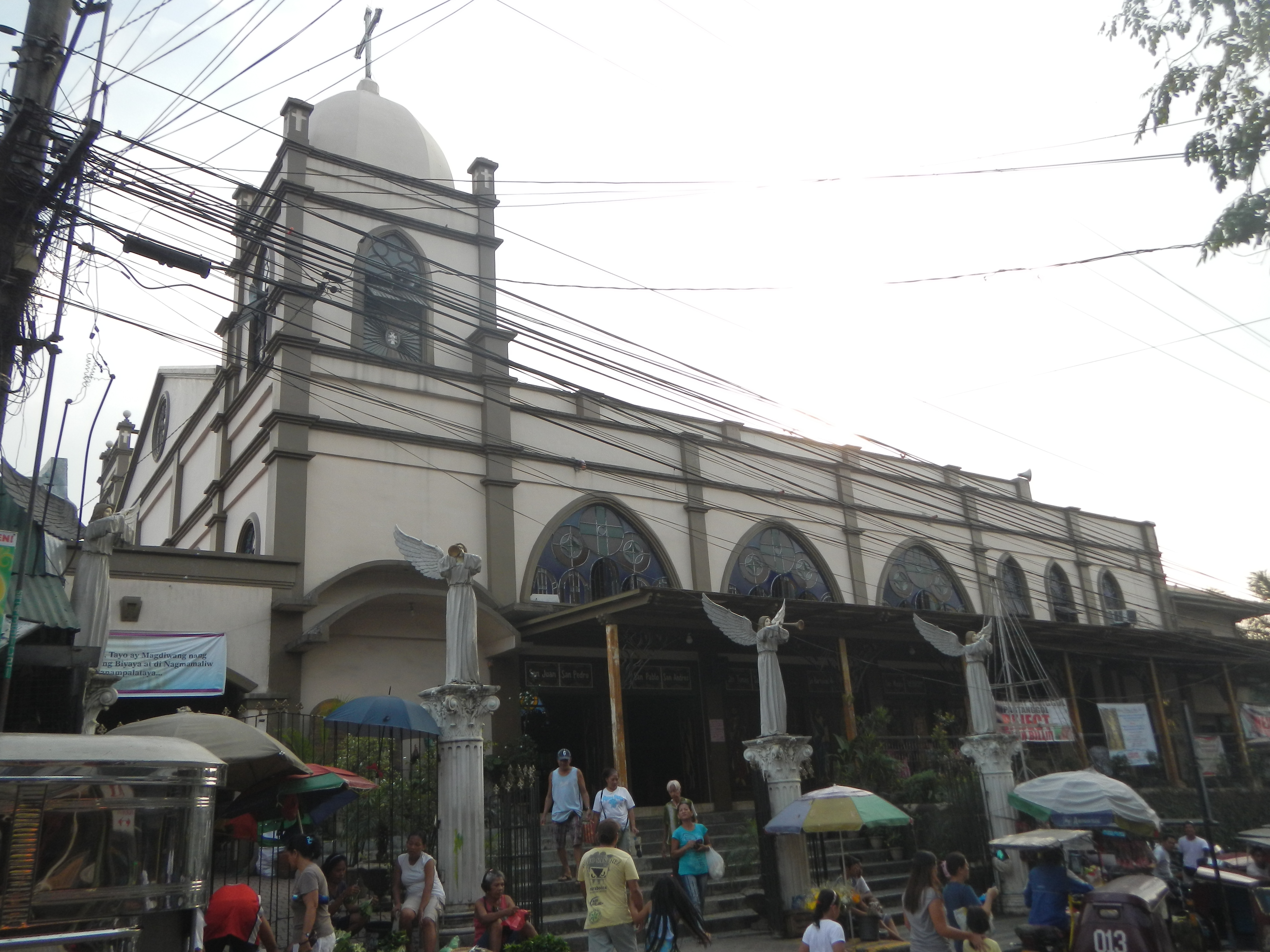
Parokya ni San Pedro Apostol Church (1854 St. Joseph the Worker Parish Church Barangay Poblacion I)

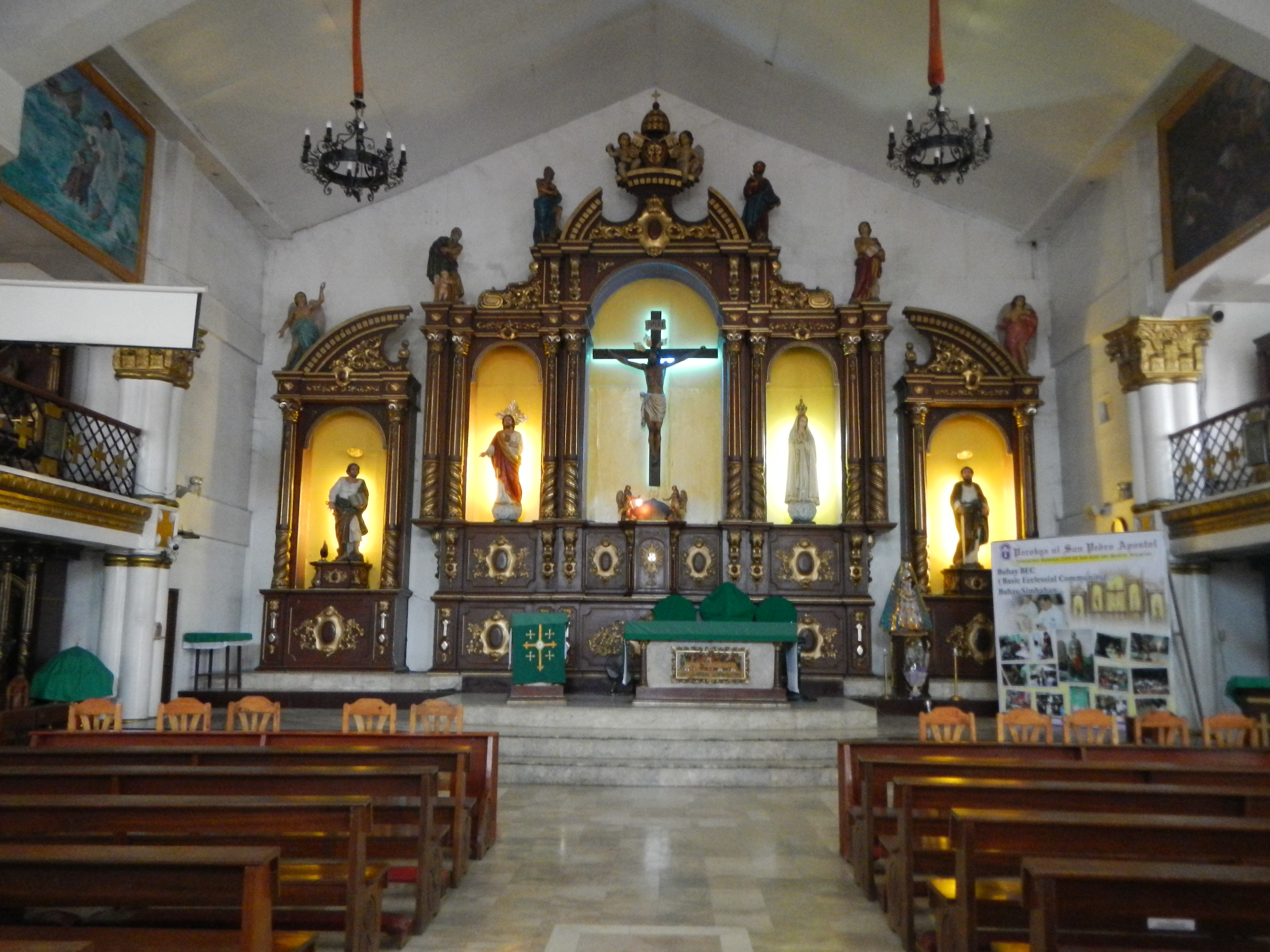
Altar

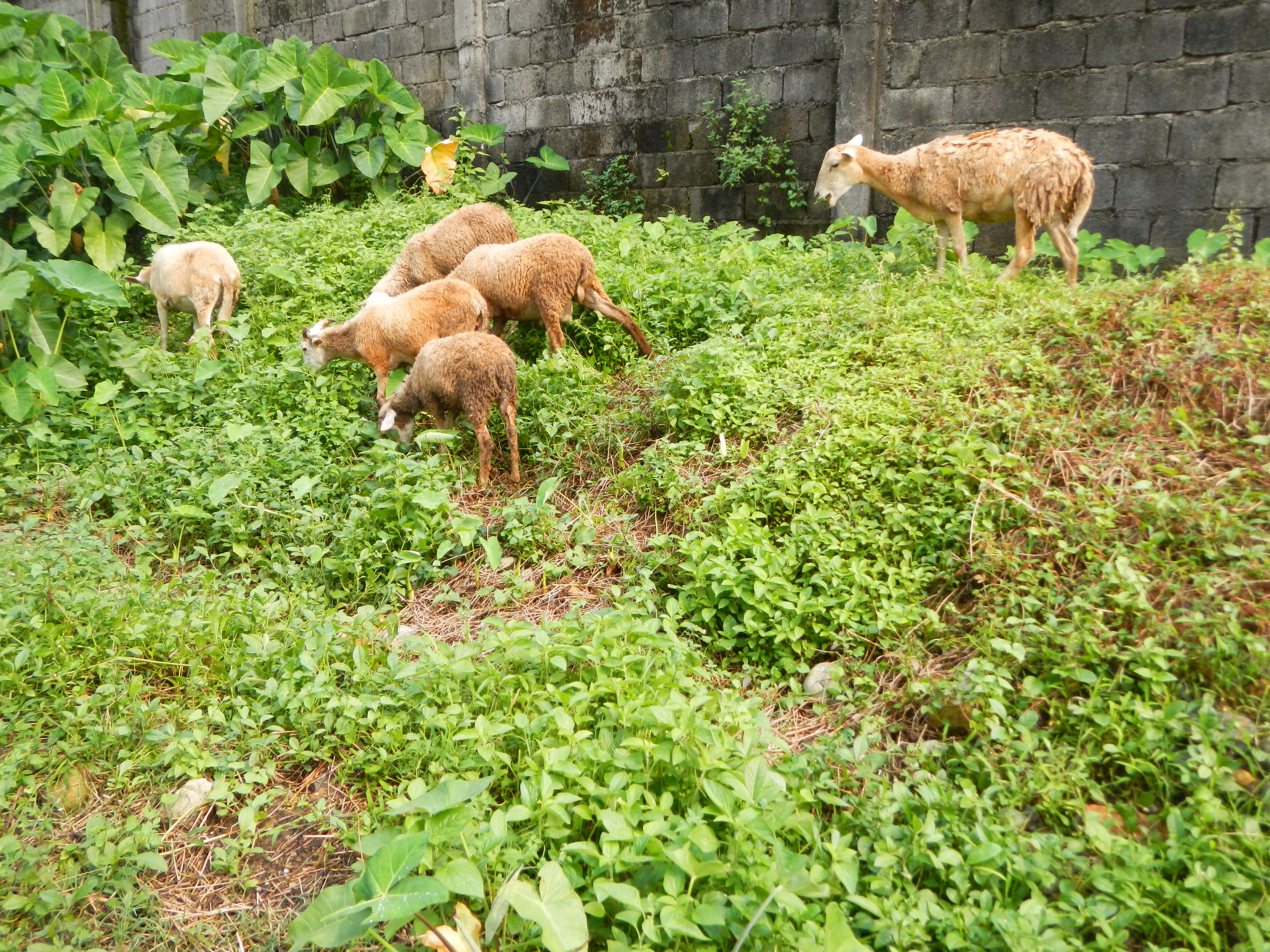
Sheep grazing in Paradise Farms

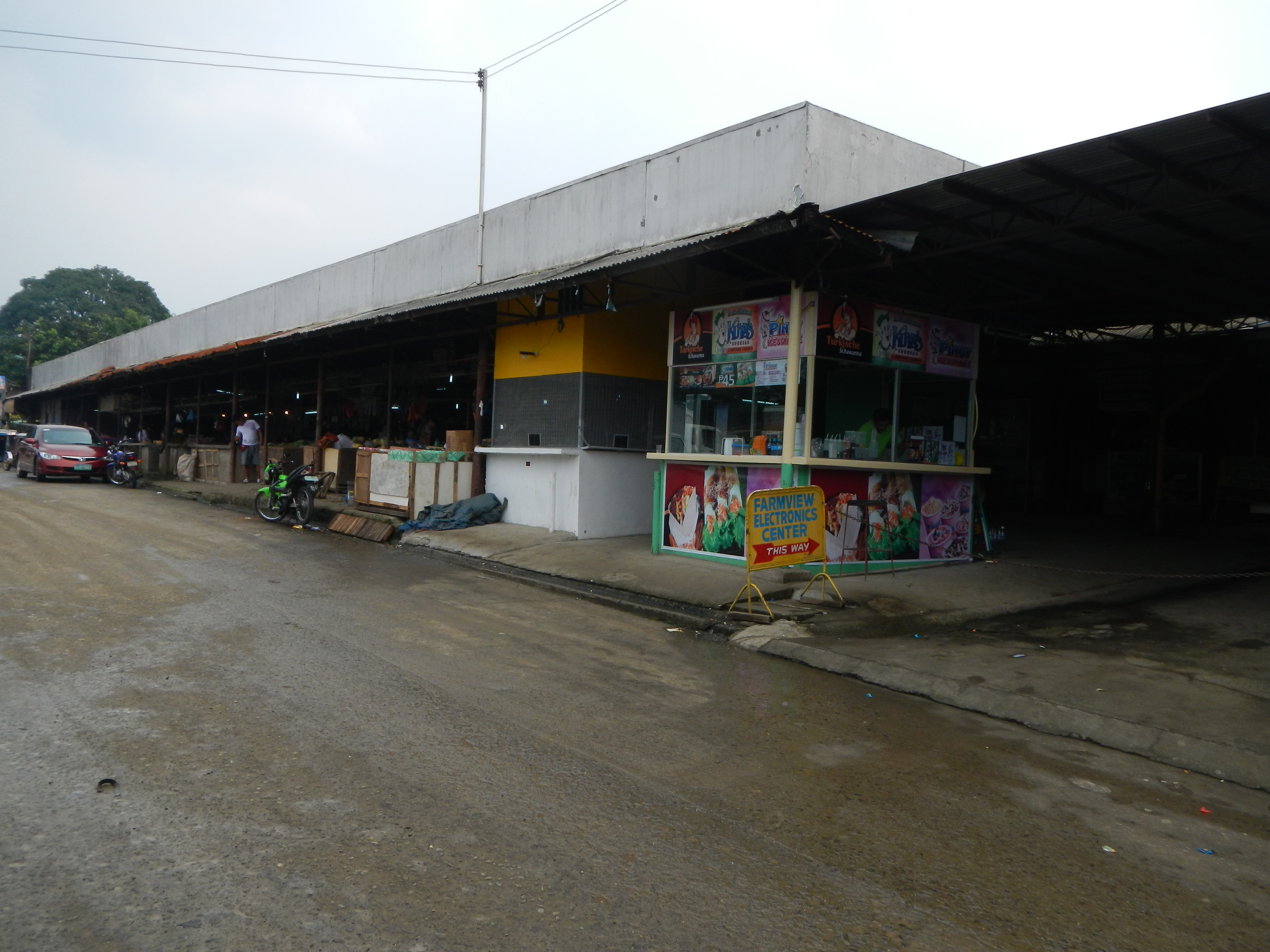
Dalisay Market

SM San Jose Del Monte (also known as SM Tungko)

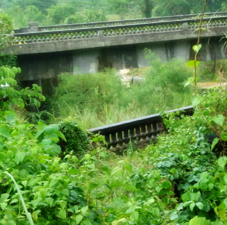
Historical Bridge in Barangay Tungkong Mangga

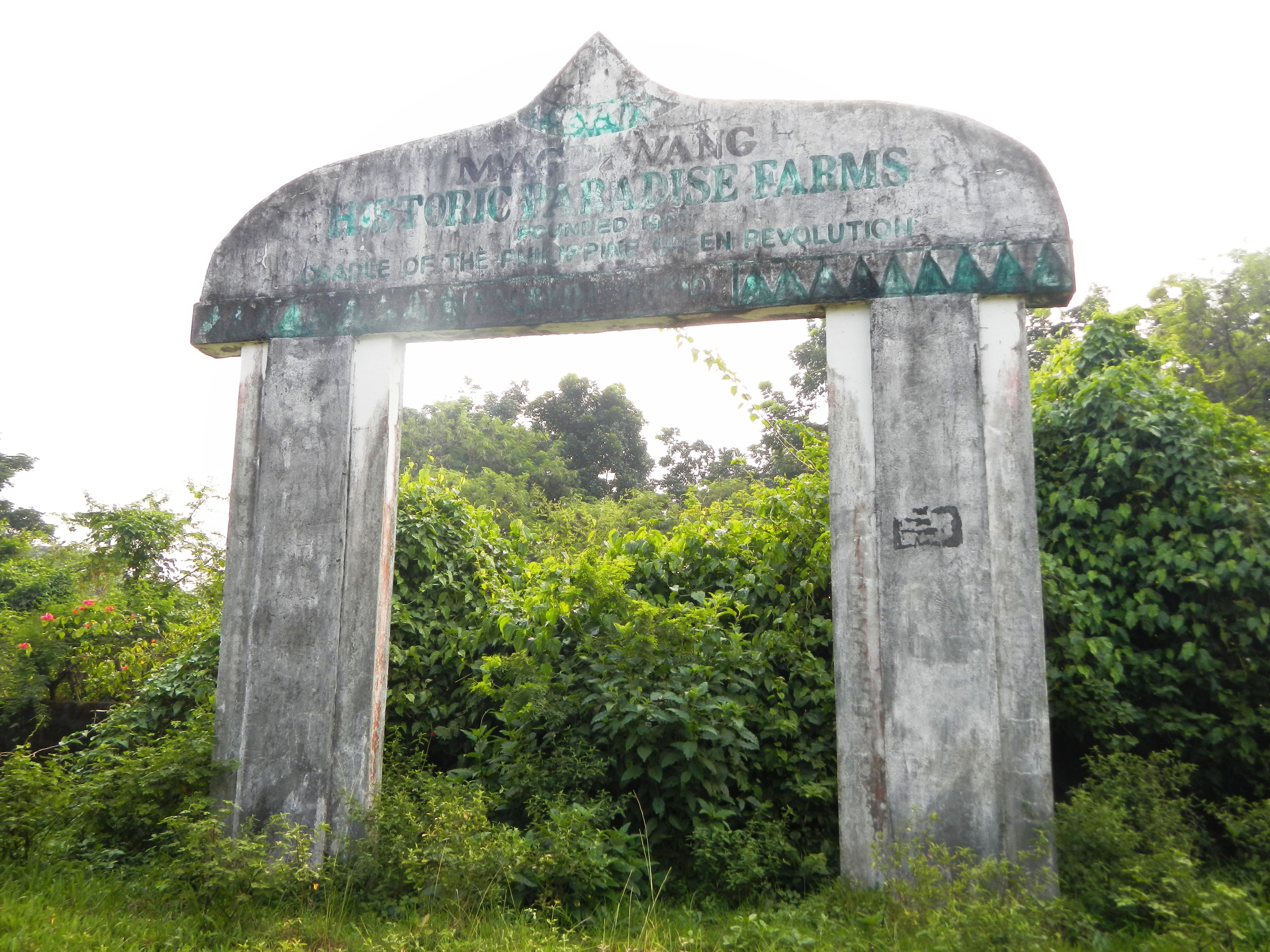
Magdiwang, Historic Paradise Farms, founded 1900, Cradle of the Philippine Green Revolution

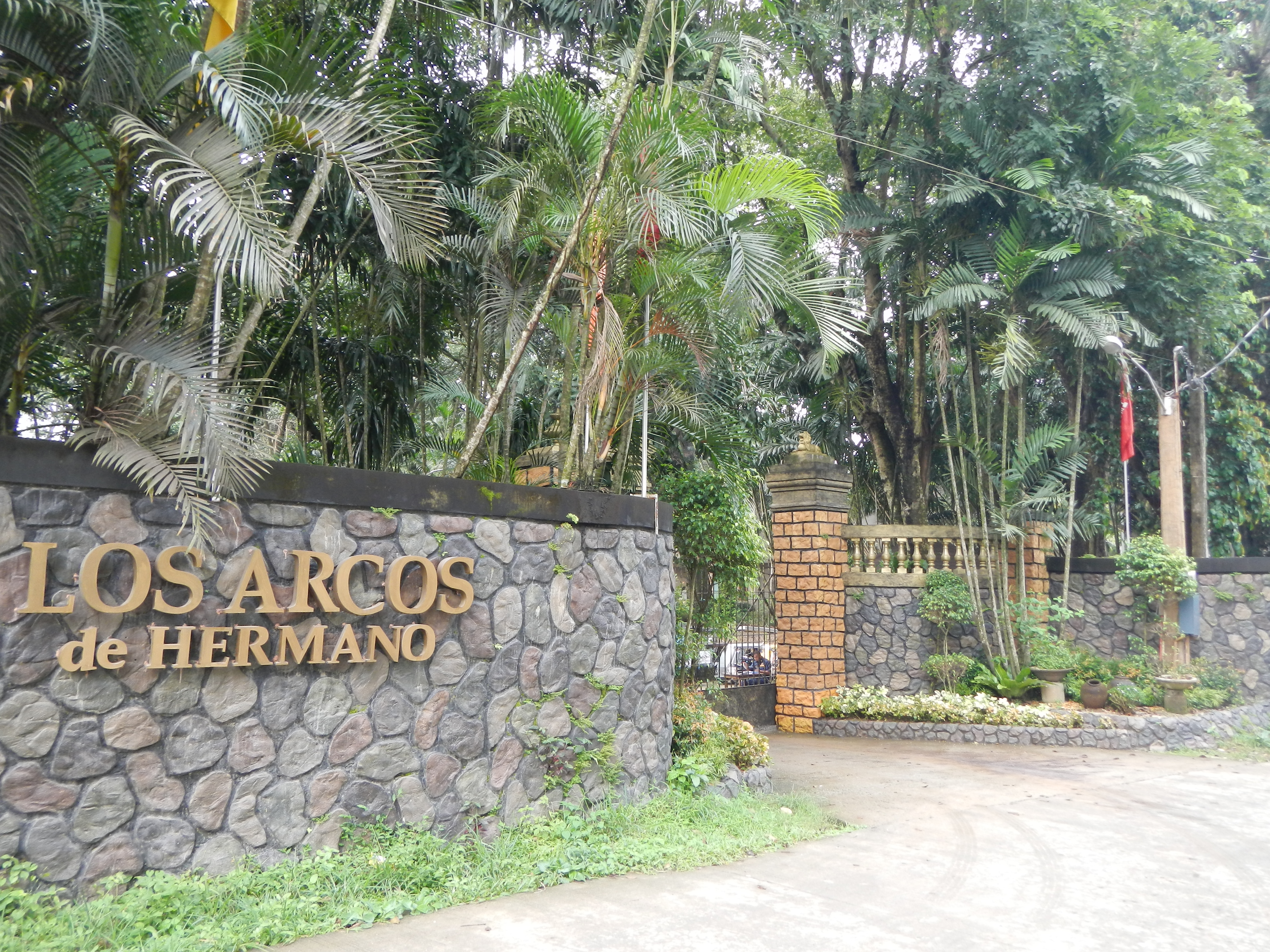
Facade of the Los Arcos de Hermano resort

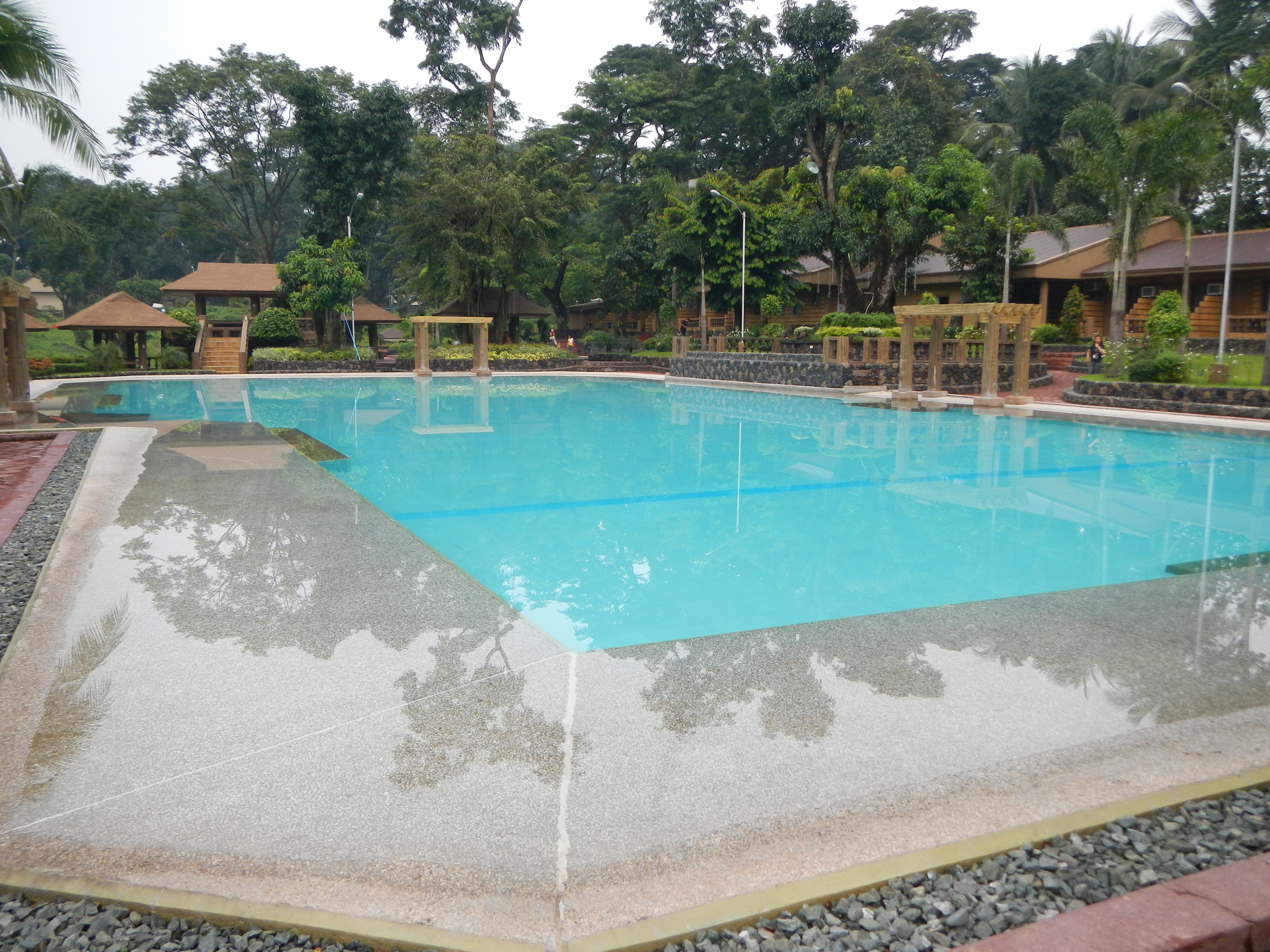
Infinity pool of the Los Arcos de Hermano resort

== See also ==
- San Jose del Monte
