= Gunnar Källén =

Swedish physicist (1926–1968)

- Born: Anders Olof Gunnar Källén; February 13, 1926; Kristianstad, Sweden
- Died: October 13, 1968 (aged 42); Hanover, Germany
- Education: Lund University
- Known for: Källén–Lehmann representation Källén function
- Scientific career
- Fields: Theoretical physics
- Workplaces: NORDITA; Bohr Institute; Lund University
- Thesis: Formal integration of the equations of quantum theory in the Heisenberg representation (1950)
- Academic advisors: Torsten Gustafson; Wolfgang Pauli
- Doctoral students: Keijo Kajantie; Alfred C.T. Wu

Anders Olof Gunnar Källén (13 February 1926 – 13 October 1968) was a Swedish theoretical physicist and professor at Lund University, known for his work on correlation functions in quantum field theory. He died at the age of 42 as a result of a plane crash.

== Biography ==
Anders Olof Gunnar Källén was born in 1926 in Kristianstad, Sweden. His father, Yngve Källén, was a teacher of physics and mathematics, and together they published a paper on the theory of relativity. Gunnar's brother was the embryologist Bengt Källén.

Källén earned his doctorate at Lund in 1950 working with Torsten Gustafson, who was in close correspondence with Wolfgang Pauli. He worked at CERN's theoretical division from 1952 to 1957, which, at that time, was situated at the Institute for Theoretical Physics of the University of Copenhagen, later to be named the Niels Bohr Institute. Afterwards he worked at Nordita from 1957 to 1958, and then began a professorship at Lund University.

Källén's research focused on quantum field theory and elementary particle physics. His developments included the so-called Källén–Lehmann spectral representation of correlation functions in quantum field theory, and he made contributions to quantum electrodynamics, especially in renormalization. He also worked with the axiomatic formulation of quantum field theory, which led to contributions to the theory of functions of several complex variables, and collaborated on the Pauli–Källén equation.

The Källén function, as well as the Källén–Yang–Feldman formalism and the Källén–Sabry potentials are named after him.

=== Plane crash ===
Källén was an avid pilot, who, having been fascinated by flying since childhood, started taking lessons in 1964. He was flying a Piper PA-28 Cherokee Arrow from Malmö to CERN when his plane crashed during an emergency landing in Hanover, Germany in 1968. His two passengers, one of them his wife, survived the crash.

Many years after his death, Cecilia Jarlskog edited the book Portrait of Gunnar Källén: A Physics Shooting Star and Poet of Early Quantum Field Theory (Springer, 2013) with nine invited contributors, all of whom had a personal acquaintance with Källén. The book consists mainly of testimonies by Källén's colleagues. Steven Weinberg, whose first published physics paper was motivated by Källén, wrote one of the book's chapters. The chapter deals with Källén's research and is the written version of a 2009 lecture by Weinberg.

== Bibliography ==
- G. Källén, Quantenelektrodynamik, Handbuch der Physik (Springer-Verlag, Berlin, 1958)
- G. Källén, Elementary Particle Physics (Addison-Wesley, Reading, Massachusetts, 1964)
- G. Källén, Quantum Electrodynamics (Springer-Verlag, Berlin, 1972); 2013 pbk reprint
