= List of United States Navy hospital ships =

Ships of the United States Navy

Ships in current service
- Current ships

Ships grouped alphabetically
- A–B; C; D–F; G–H; I–K; L; M; N–O; P; Q–R; S; T–V; W–Z

Ships grouped by type
- Aircraft carriers; Airships; Amphibious warfare ships; Auxiliaries; Battlecruisers; Battleships; Cruisers; Destroyers; Destroyer escorts; Destroyer leaders; Escort carriers; Frigates; Hospital ships; Littoral combat ships; Mine warfare vessels; Monitors; Oilers; Patrol vessels; Registered civilian vessels; Sailing frigates; Steam frigates; Steam gunboats; Ships of the line; Sloops of war; Submarines; Torpedo boats; Torpedo retrievers; Unclassified miscellaneous; Yard and district craft

Hospital ships of many types have been part of the United States Navy at least since 1798. Their special status has been internationally recognised under the second Geneva Convention of 1906 and the Hague Convention of 1907.

In this list, the particular roles of some hospital ships are identified, e.g. as ambulance vessels, rescue ships, and evacuation ships. Also included are ships that had a dual role, also serving as barracks ships, receiving ships, supply ships or guard ships.

Ship status is indicated as either currently active [A], ready reserve [R], inactive [I], or precommissioning [P]. Ships in the inactive category include only ships in the inactive reserve, ships which have been disposed from US service have no listed status.

== Pre-Geneva Conventions ==
- USS Intrepid (1798)
- USS Ben Morgan (1826)
- USS Pawnee (1859)
- USS Red Rover (1859)
- USS Home (1862)
- USS Relief (1896)

== Confederate States Hospital Ship ==
- Star of the West renamed CSS Saint Philip

== Post-Geneva Conventions ==
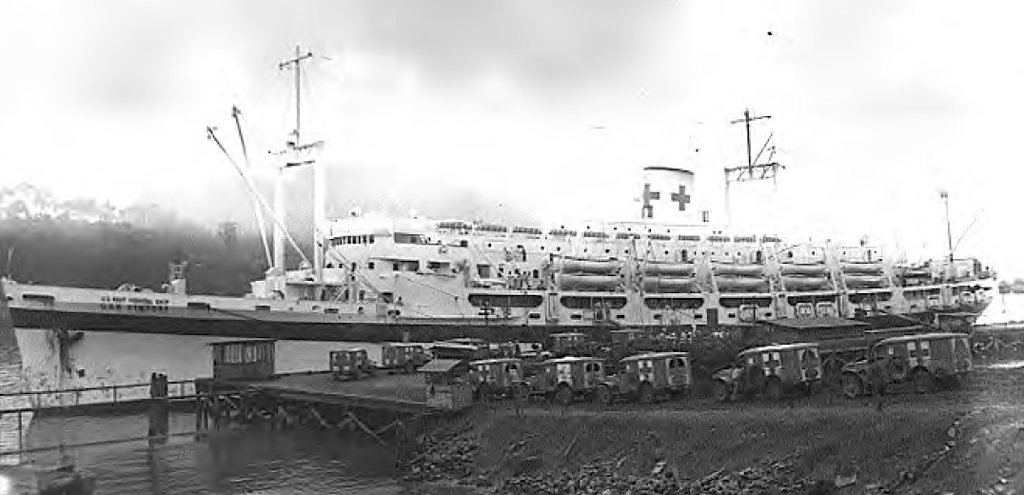
USS Comfort (AH-6)

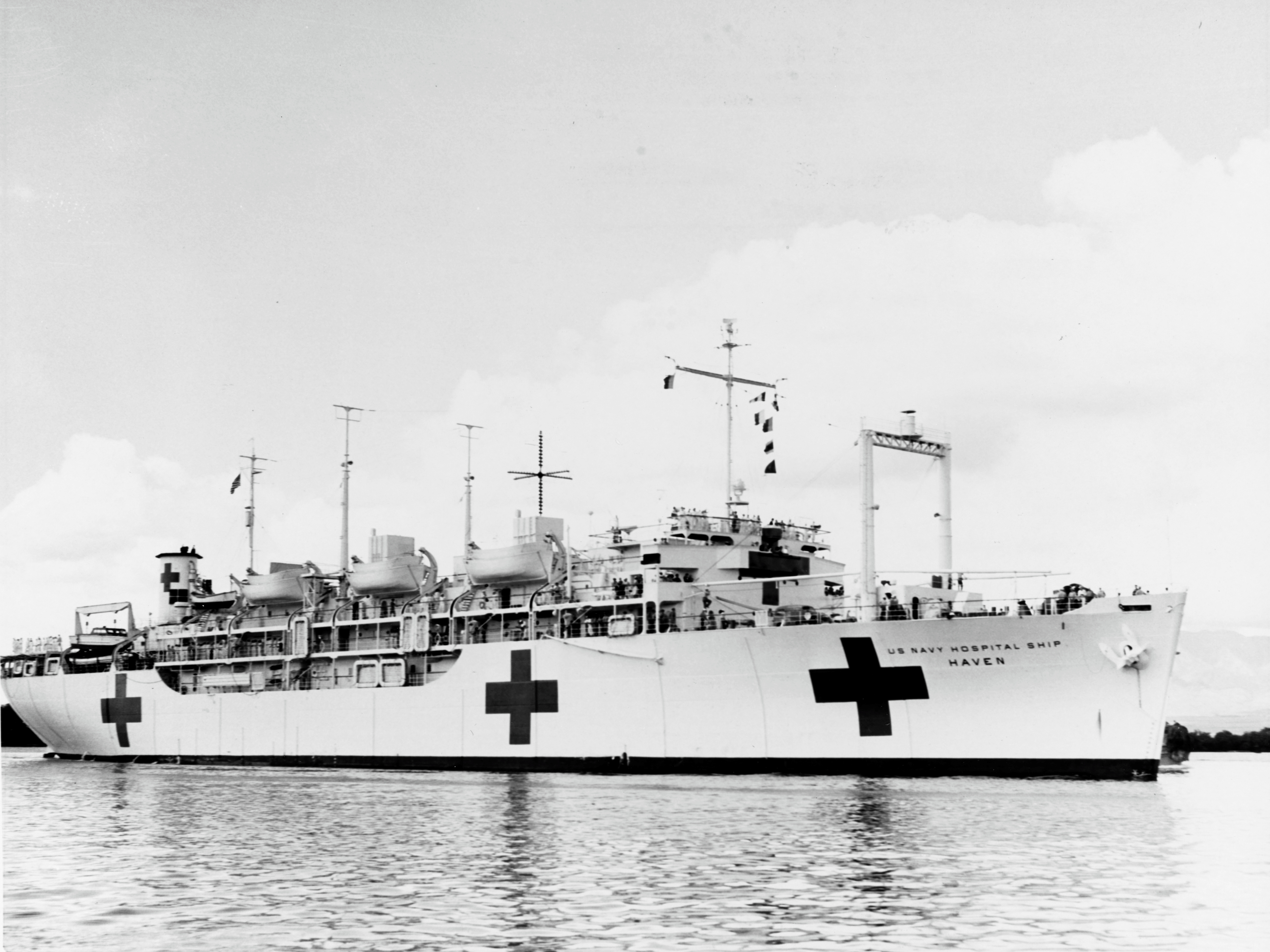
USS Haven (AH-12)

USNS Mercy (T-AH-19)

- USS Relief (AH-1) (1920–1946)
- USS Solace (AH-2) (1898–1905, 1908–1909, 1909–1921)
- USS Comfort (AH-3) (1917-1921), later serving as USAHS Shamrock (1943-1946)
- USS Mercy (AH-4), ex-ID-1305 (1917)
- USS Solace (AH-5) (1941–1946)
- USS Bountiful (AH-9), ex-AP-1 (1944–1946)
- USS Samaritan (AH-10), ex-AP-5 (1944–1946)
- USS Refuge (AH-11), ex-AP-62 (1944–1946)
- USS Rescue (AH-18), ex-AS-21, AG-67 (1945–1946)

Comfort class: United States Maritime Commission (MC) type C1-B

These ships all were commissioned in the US Navy, and had a US Navy Crew, but the hospital was operated by the US Army. These ships, unlike the Navy hospital ships, were intended for evacuation and transport of patients after primary care had been given.

- USS Comfort (AH-6) (1944–1946)
- USS Hope (AH-7) (1944–1946)
- USS Mercy (AH-8) (1944–1946)

Haven class: MC type C4-S-B2

- USS Haven (AH-12), briefly APH-112, (1945–1947), Operation Crossroads nuclear test participant, (1950–1957)
- USS Benevolence (AH-13) (1945–1947), Operation Crossroads participant, sunk in collision 25 April 1950, 23 killed
- USS Tranquillity (AH-14), briefly APH-114 (1945–1946)
- USS Consolation (AH-15) (1945–1946, 1950–1955), later SS Hope, a charitable Hospital Ship
- USS Repose (AH-16) (1945–1950, 1950–1954, 1965–1970)
- USS Sanctuary (AH-17) (1945–1946, 1966–1971, 1972–1975)

Mercy class

- USNS Mercy (T-AH-19) [A] (1986-)
- USNS Comfort (T-AH-20) [A] (1987-)

== Receiving Ships, Supply Ships, and Guard Ships ==
See also: List of unclassified miscellaneous vessels of the United States Navy (IX)

A receiving ship is any vessel that serves as a point of induction into the service for new recruits. Vessels were not built for the purpose of serving in this role, rather, vessels were appointed. This normally came at the end of a vessels combat career. As such, the vessels condition was such that it was best to remain in port, at anchor. Modifications to ships serving in this role often included the removal of weapons, and the erecting of housing structures on the main deck. Upon release from receiving duties most ships were either decommissioned or transferred to a state's Naval Militia.

Records for the receiving ship were particularly modest and as such very little history is recorded of these once proud ships upon impressment into receiving duties. The actual medical duties of these ships usually was defined by the space available, and based on the need, availability of local Naval Hospitals, and the availability of a medical staff. Each receiving ship played a different role as a hospital ship if any. Refits were done locally and at discretion, if at all. In addition to the receiving ships, store ships and guard ships often took on hospital ship, hospital tender, health ship, or quarantine duties as the need or opportunity arose.

- USS Ohio (1820)
- USS Pennsylvania (1837)
- USS Jamestown (1844)
- USS Vermont (1848)
- USS Princeton (1851)
- USS A. Houghton (1852)
- USS Mohawk (1853)
- USS Hartford (1858)
- USS Franklin (1864)
- USS New Hampshire (1864)
- USS Boston (1884)
- USS Reina Mercedes (IX-25)
- USS Puritan (BM-1)
- USS Commodore (IX-7)
- USS Cumberland (IX-8)
- USS Seattle (IX-39)
- USS Newark (C-1)
- USS Philadelphia (C-4)
- USS Southery (IX-26)
- USS Relief I
- USS Valparaiso

== Ambulance boats and transports ==
A relatively large number of hospital or ambulance boats have been used by various commands, squadrons, bases, districts, and theaters through most times of conflict and peace. These boats came in all shapes and sizes, and were picked for a variety of reasons, such as availability and need.

- USS Adrian (ex-Westport)
- USS Seagate
- USS Southport
- Ambulance Boat No. 1, later YH-1 (YT-86-class tugboat)
- Ambulance Boat No. 2, later YH-2 (YT-86-class tugboat), experienced engine room explosion 08 June 1931, one fatality
- YH-3 (YT-86-class tugboat)
- YH-4
- Landing Craft Utility (Type 1610, 1627, 1646)
- Landing Craft Mechanized (Type 6 and 8)

== Landing Ship Tank (Casualty Evacuation) ==
A number of Commanders modified, outfitted, or simply designated Tank Landing Ships to serve in a dual role as an interim hospital designated LSTH.

== Rescue Ships ==
The PCE-842-class patrol craft class was the basis of an armed rescue ship. These were built on the hull of the PCE (Patrol Craft Escort) by the Pullman Standard Car Manufacturing Co. in Chicago, Illinois and classified first as APRs (Convoy rescue craft) and then as PCERs (Patrol Craft Escort Rescue). Of the 54 PCERs ordered, 13 were laid down, 12 were commissioned, and 5 saw service as rescue ships. The ships served three missions: damage control / firefighting; casualty treatment / evacuation; and patrol / guardship. Each ship's hospital was composed of 65 beds, a surgical suite, and X-Ray facilities. The medical department consisted of a staff of 11 doctors and hospital corpsmen. Ships designated PCER were numbers 847 to 859. However, PCER-847 was redesignated before commissioning as a PCE. PCERs 848, 849 and 850 underwent conversion in Brisbane, Australia. The refits converted their expansive hospital space into a communications center and the ships new mission was to serve as a signal ship for the US Army landings in the Philippines and Japan. PCERs 856, 857, and 859 missed WWII and saw virtually no service as they were intended. The remaining ships of interest, PCERs 851-855 had a short but remarkable war record. Some notable ships of this class were:

- USS Fairview (PCER-850)
- USS Brattleboro (PCER-852)
- USS Amherst (PCER-853)

== Rescue Transport Ships ==
All five of these ships were ordered and cancelled before construction began 12 March 1943. This class was the replacement of the theoretical class referred to as APH (Auxiliary Personnel Transport Hospital). The five ships were named:

- USS Berkshire (APR-2)
- USS Burleigh (APR-3)
- USS Baxter (APR-4)
- USS Duchess (APR-5)
- USS Douglas (APR-7)

== Evacuation Ships of WWII ==
Evacuation ships carried light armament, but did not meet the criteria established by the Geneva Conventions for the designation of Hospital Ship because they carried troops and sometimes arms in combination with injured. An example would be ferrying injured troops away from combat zones and troops and military supplies to combat zones. Most notably, the evacuation ships took part in returning troops at the end of the World War II.

- USS Tryon (APH-1), later T-AP-186
- USS Pinkney (APH-2), later T-AP-184
- USS Rixey (APH-3), later T-AP-185
- USS Haven (APH-112), ex- and later AH-12
- USS Tranquillity (APH-114), ex- and later AH-14

== Modified Barracks Ships of Vietnam ==
Originally planned as Riverine Hospital Ships, the idea was scratched due to the need to bring the ships too close to shore, and required a dual support role. Of the Barracks Ships assigned to the U.S. Mobile Riverine Force, only the Colleton was specially refitted for the expanded hospital role and unofficially assigned the designation APBH (Auxiliary Propulsion Barracks Hospital).

- USS Colleton (APB-36)

== Spearhead-class Expeditionary Fast Transport, Flight II, Ambulance Variant ==
The Spearhead-class Expeditionary Fast Transport has a "Limited Medical Mission" role for the Flight II Variant of the ship. While not the ship's primary mission, the variant will include a combined forward resuscitative care capability with a limited Intensive Care Unit (ICU) and medical ward. The Flight II Variants are expected to be 338 feet long with a displacement of 2,400 metric tons.

- USNS Cody (T-EPF-14) [A] (2024-)
- USNS Point Loma (T-EPF-15) [A] (2025-)
- USNS Lansing (T-EPF-16) [P] - Awarded 3 May 2022, pending delivery

== Expeditionary Medical Ship ==
Starting with EPF-17, a new class of Joint High-Speed Vessel based on a catamaran hull will be the last of a series of ships the Navy expects to procure from the Austal USA shipyard in Mobile, Alabama. The Fast Expeditionary Medical Variant design calls for a vessel to be 417 feet long and displace 3,100 metric tons, with a draft of just 13 feet. It is expected to be between 1/3 to 1/2 the size of the Mercy-class hospital ships, and will not replace them, but supplement the US Navy's Enhanced Doctrine for Medical Support to Expeditionary Forces. The contract award is expected to be announced in September 2022, and delivery in 2025.

Bethesda class

- USNS Bethesda (T-EMS-1) [P], ex-T-EPF-17
- USNS Balboa (T-EMS-2) [P], ex-T-EPF-18
- USNS Portsmouth (T-EMS-3) [P], ex-T-EPF-19

== See also ==
- List of U.S. Army hospital ships
- Hospital Ships of the Sanitary Commission
- SS United States § Hospital ship (1970s), a plan to convert the ocean liner United States into a hospital ship
- The Floating Hospital a charitable organization in Long Island NY
