= Type C4 ship =

Cargo ships built by the United States Maritime Commission

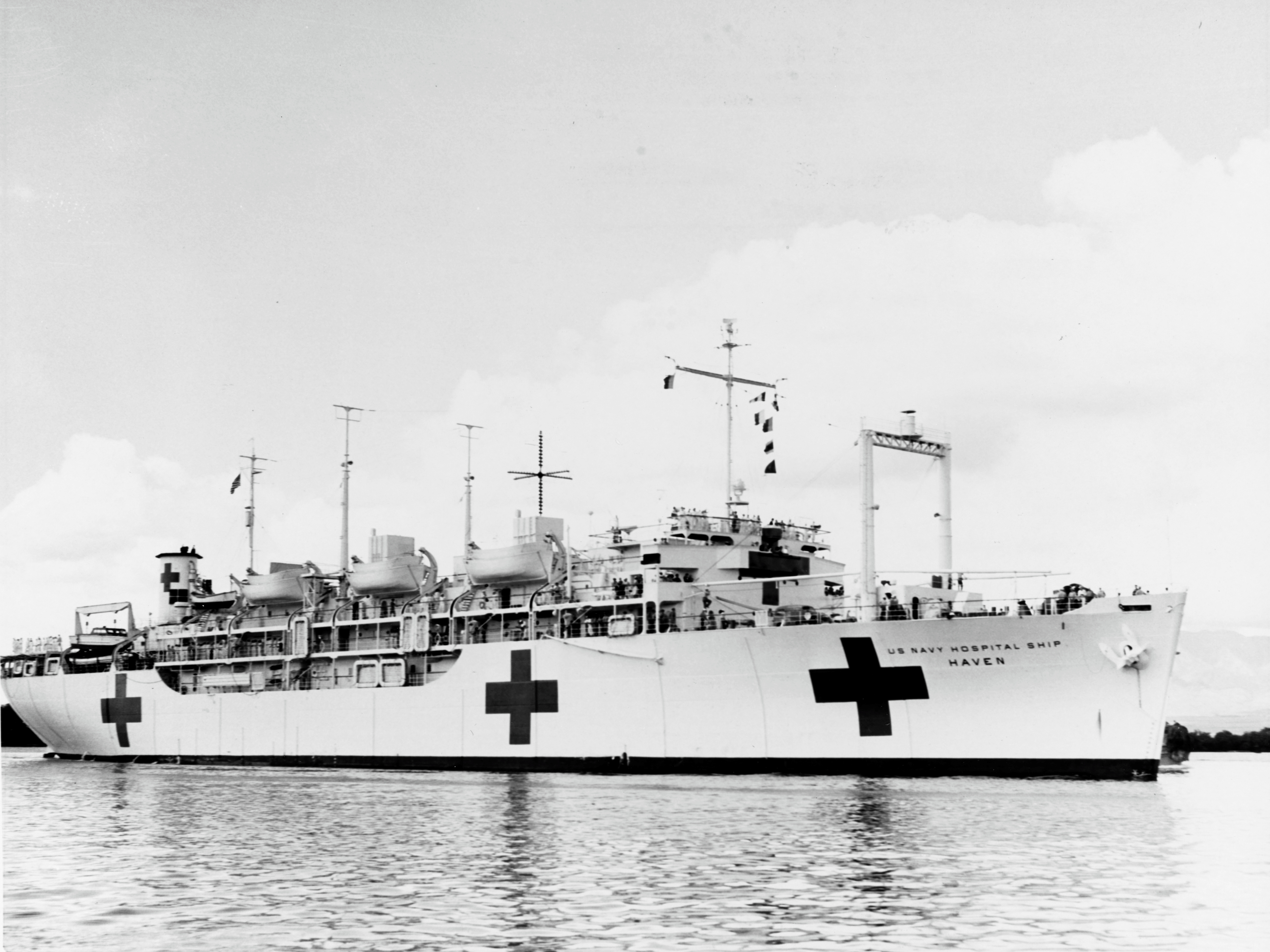
- USS Haven, an example of a Type C4 ship, seen here in 1954, a type C4-S-B2 ship.

Class overview
- Builders: Kaiser Shipyards of Richmond, California; Kaiser Shipyards of Vancouver, Washington; Sun Shipbuilding & Drydock Co. of Chester, Pennsylvania; Bethlehem Sparrows Point Shipyard of Sparrows Point, Maryland
- Operators: United States Maritime Commission (MARCOM)
- Preceded by: Type C3 ship
- Subclasses: Six
- Completed: 81

General characteristics
- Type: C4-S-A1 troop transport (30 built); C4-S-A3 troop transport (15 built); C4-S-A4 cargo ship (16 built); C4-S-B1 tank carrier (one built); C4-S-B 2 troop transport/hospital ship (14 built); C4-S-B5 cargo/troop transport (five built)
- Tonnage: 12,420 GRT (A1-A4); 11,757 GRT (B1-B5)
- Length: 523 ft (159 m) (A1-A4); 520 ft (160 m) (B1-B5)
- Beam: 71.6 ft (21.8 m)
- Draft: 29 ft (8.8 m) (A1-A4); 30 ft (9.1 m) (B1-B5)
- Propulsion: Steam turbine; 9,900 shp (7,400 kW)
- Speed: 17 knots (31 km/h; 20 mph)
- Range: 12,000 miles (A1-A4); 14,000 miles (B1-B5)
- Complement: Varied by design type

The Type C4 ships were the largest cargo ships built by the United States Maritime Commission (MARCOM) during World War II. The design was originally developed for the American-Hawaiian Steamship Company in 1941, but in late 1941 the plans were taken over by the MARCOM.

Eighty-one ships were built as cargo or troopships in four shipyards: Kaiser Richmond, California (35 ships); Kaiser Vancouver, Washington (20 ships); Sun Shipbuilding and Drydock in Chester, Pennsylvania (20 ships); and Bethlehem Steel Sparrows Point, Maryland (6 ships). All ships were capable of 17 knots (31 km/h; 20 mph), driven by a single screw steam turbine generating 9,900 shaft horsepower (7,400 kW). Many were completed for the War Shipping Administration.

Among the variations of the design were the Haven-class hospital ship.

They were followed post-war by thirty-seven of the larger C4-S-1 class, also known as the Mariner class.

== List of Type C4 ships ==
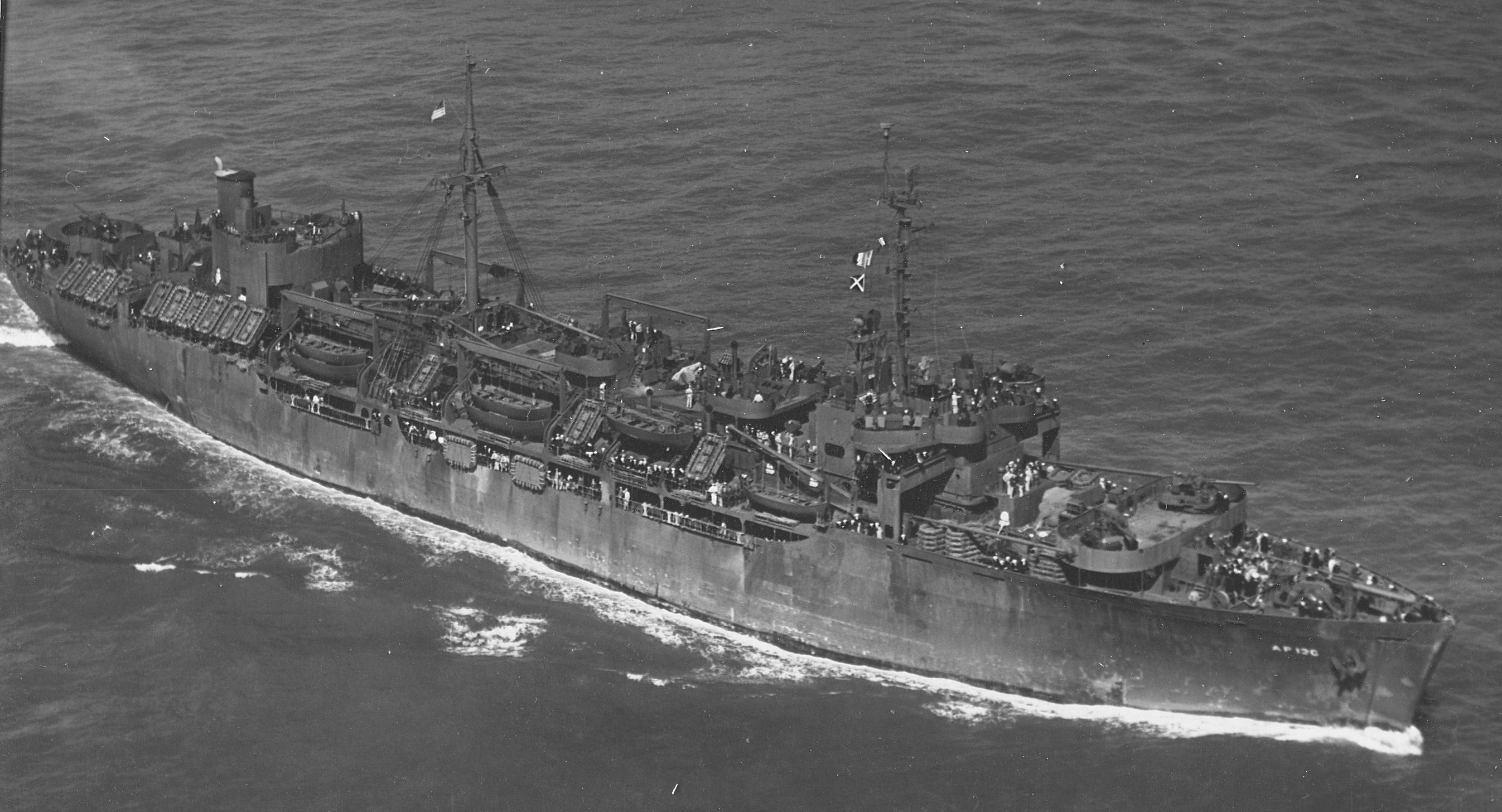
USS General G.O. Squier, a C4-S-A1

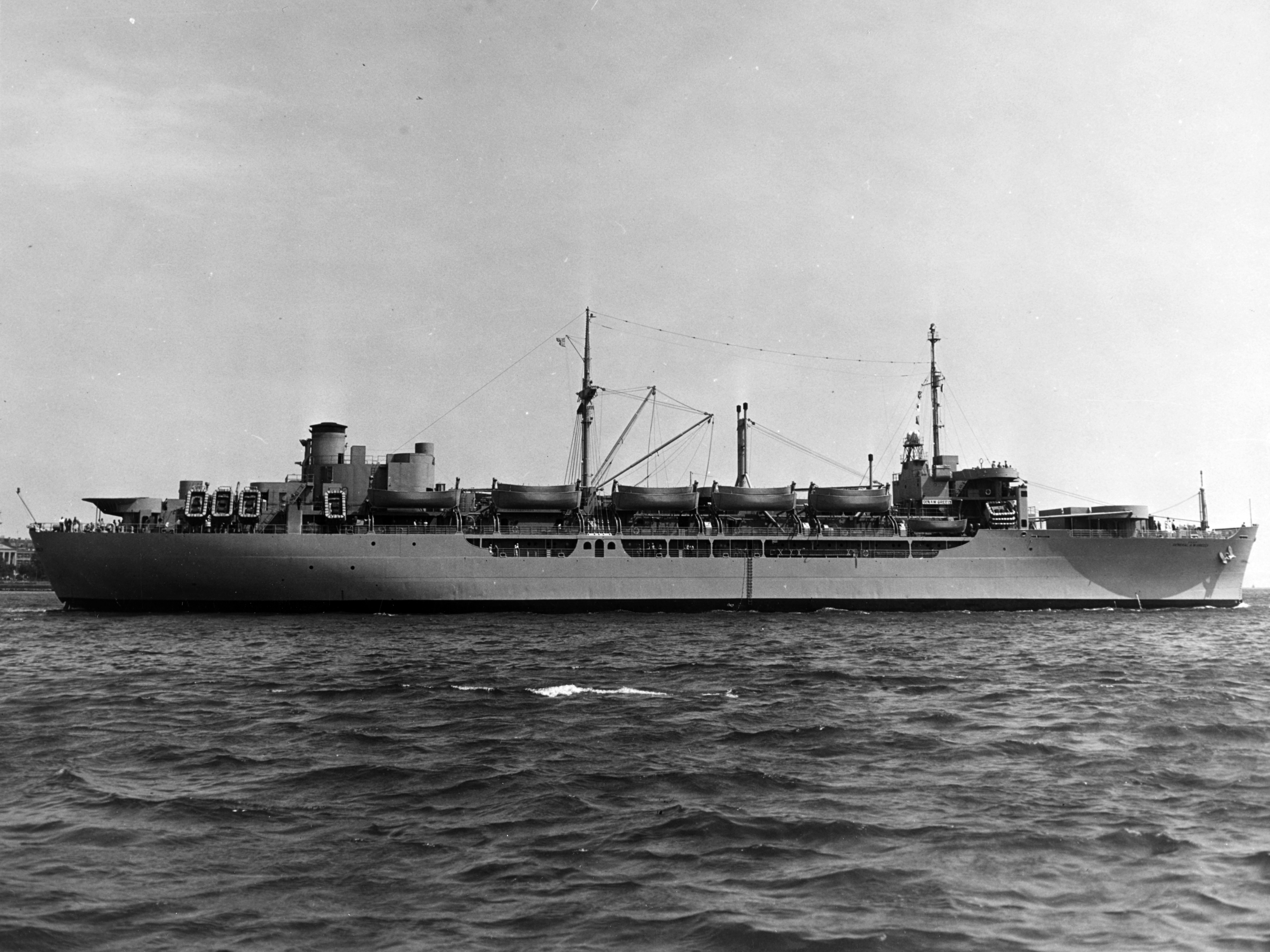
General G.O. Squier-class USNS General A.W. Greely (T-AP-141) in the early 1950s

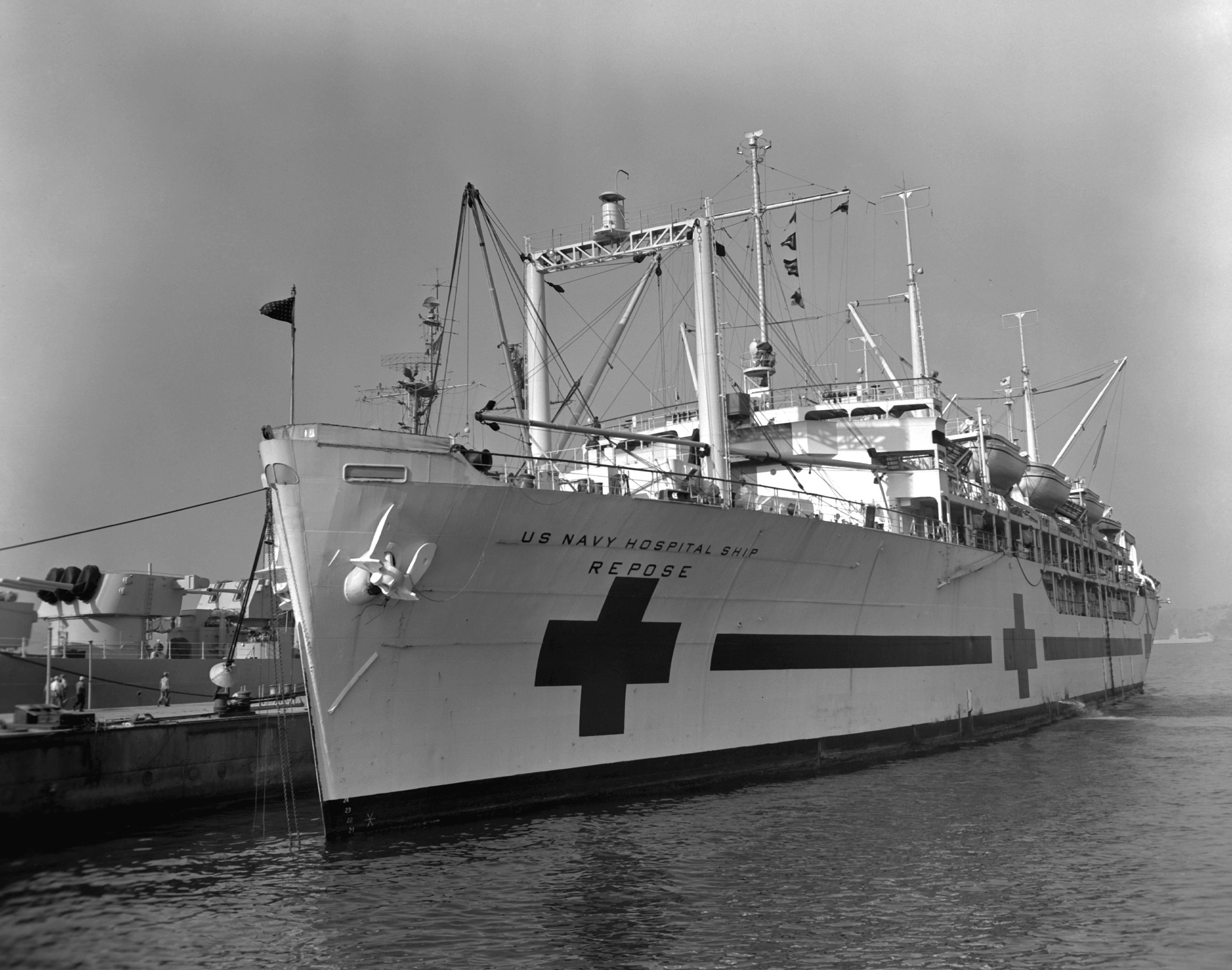
USS Repose (AH-16) at Yokosuka, Japan, 1952

=== General series ===
C4-S-A1 DWT: 14,863. Built by Kaiser Shipyards at Permanente No. 3 in Richmond, California, for the US Army Transportation Corps then transferred later to the US Navy. The 30 ships were built from 1942 to 1945. Sun Shipbuilding of Chester, Pennsylvania, originally had a contract to build 30 of the C4 ships. The USMC prioritized Sun's expertise in building urgently needed T2-SE-A1 tankers and withdrew 20 C4s from Sun and assigned them to Kaiser's Richmond, California yard. Kaiser's C4 troop ship construction became Navy troop ships ("General" names), Sun's became WSA troopships operated by commercial agents. In the 1960 the Navy sold off most of the General ships to private companies. Most were scrapped in the 1980s.

- USS General G. O. Squier (AP-130)
- USS General T. H. Bliss (AP-131)
- USS General J. R. Brooke (AP-132)
- USS General O. H. Ernst (AP-133)
- USS General R. L. Howze (AP-134)
- USS General W. M. Black (AP-135)
- USS General H. L. Scott (AP-136)
- USS General S. D. Sturgis (AP-137)
- USS General C. G. Morton (AP-138)
- USS General R. E. Callan (AP-139), later USNS General H. H. Arnold (T-AGM-9) a missile range instrumentation ship
- USS General M. B. Stewart (AP-140)
- USS General A. W. Greely (AP-141)
- USS General C. H. Muir (AP-142)
- USS General H. B. Freeman (AP-143)
- USS General H. F. Hodges (AP-144)
- USS General Harry Taylor (AP-145), later USNS General Hoyt S. Vandenberg (T-AGM-10)
- USS General W. F. Hase (AP-146)

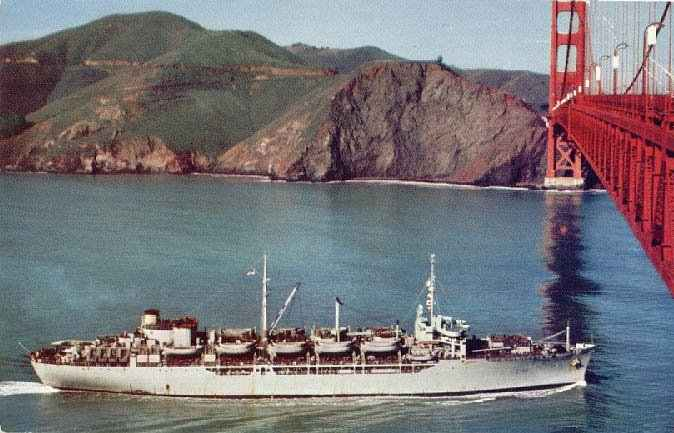
USS General C. G. Morton at Golden Gate

- USS General E. T. Collins (AP-147)
- USS General M. L. Hersey (AP-148)
- USS General J. H. McRae (AP-149)
- USS General M. M. Patrick (AP-150)
- USS General W. C. Langfitt (AP-151)
- USS General Omar Bundy (AP-152) went missing in 1980.
- USS General R. M. Blatchford (AP-153)
- USS General LeRoy Eltinge (AP-154)
- USS General A. W. Brewster (AP-155)
- USS General D. E. Aultman (AP-156)
- USS General C. C. Ballou (AP-157)
- USS General W. G. Haan (AP-158)
- USS General Stuart Heintzelman (AP-159)

=== Marine series ===
C4-S-B1, C4-S-B2, C4-S-B5 15,300 DWT ships built for troop and cargo transport. Marine series C4 ships were operated by the War Shipping Administration (WSA) through commercial companies acting as agents during World War II. Others became Navy hospital ships. Sun Shipbuilding of Chester, Pennsylvania, originally had a contract to build 30 of the C4 ships. The USMC prioritized Sun's expertise in building urgently needed T2-SE-A1 tankers and withdrew 20 C4s from Sun and assigned them to Kaiser's Richmond, California yard. Kaiser's C4 troop ship construction became Navy troop ships ("General" names), Sun's became WSA troopships operated by commercial agents.

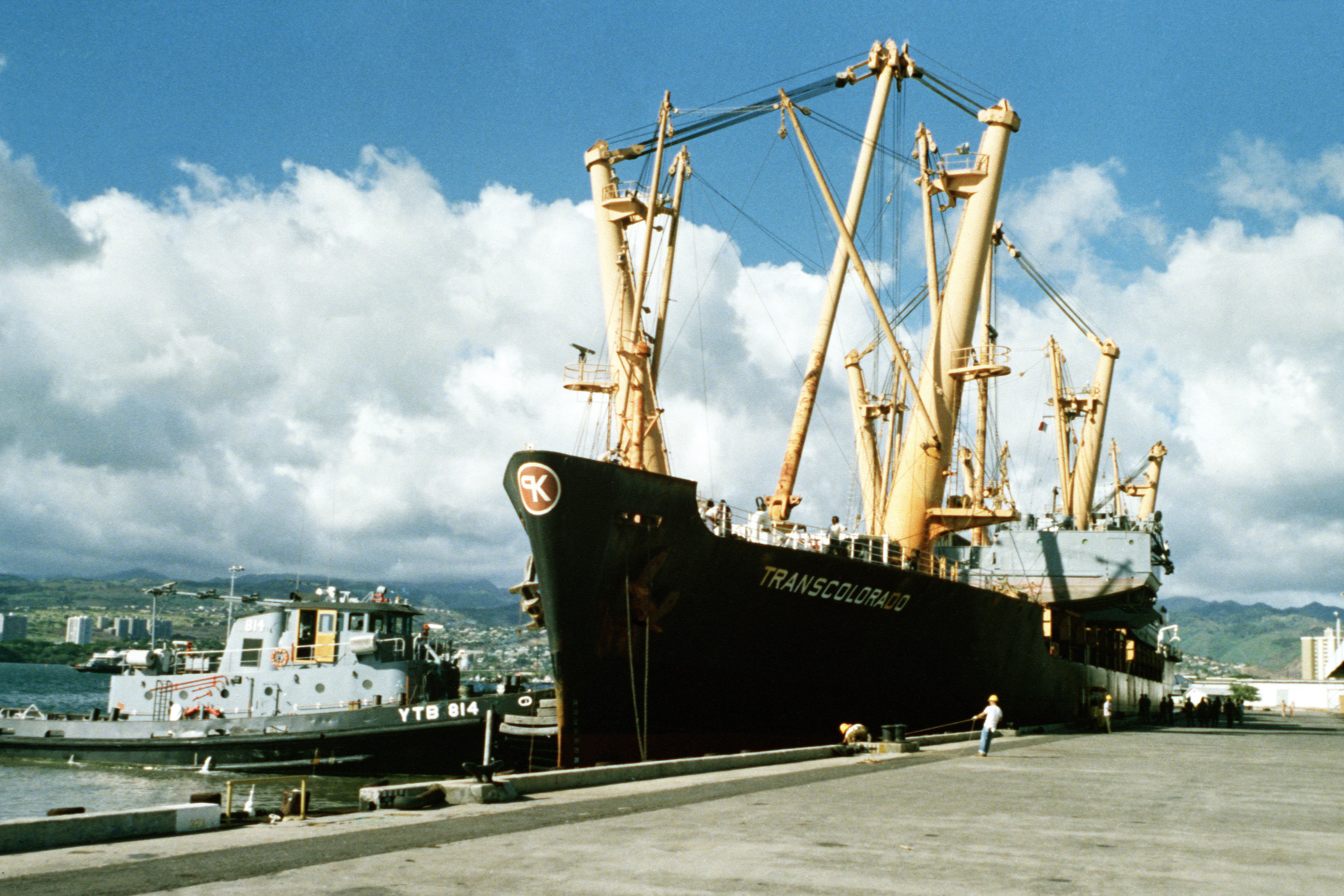
USNS Marine Adder as MSC Time Charter, a C4-S-A3

==== C4-S-B1 (Sun) ====
Only one in class, built by Sun Yards of Chester, Pennsylvania.

- SS Marine Eagle Completed as War Shipping Administration cargo ship but outfitted to carry limited troops. Operated by WSA December 1943 — March 1946 allocated to Army requirements. Acquired by the U.S. Army in March 1948 and renamed USNS Private Leonard C. Brostrom (T-AK-255). Built as a tank carrier in 1943. Converted for heavy lift in 1953.

==== C4-S-B2 (Sun) ====
14 built by Sun Ship for World War II were used as troop ships in 1944 and 1945. The United States Navy took over 6 to become Haven-class hospital ships in May 1945 and painted them white. Along with military troop movement, the C4-S-B2 participated in Operation Magic Carpet to bring home troops and their families. After the war others were converted to cargo ships.

- SS Marine Angel - Completed as War Shipping Administration troop ship. Operated April 1945 — March 1946 returning troops to U.S. from Europe and lastly Asia. Converted to laker in 1952, sold renamed McKee Sons.
- SS Marine Beaver - Became USN hospital ship USS Repose (AH-16).
- SS Marine Devil - Completed as War Shipping Administration troop ship. Operated September 1944 — April 1946 to Europe and Asia including India. Converted to container ship.
- SS Marine Dragon - Completed as War Shipping Administration troop ship. Operated December 1944 — April 1946. Shuttle between U.K. and France. August 1945 to Pacific. Converted to container ship.
- SS Marine Dolphin - Became hospital ship USS Tranquillity (AH-14).
- Marine Fox - Completed as War Shipping Administration troop ship. Operated March 1945 — May 1946 Europe and Pacific. Assigned with Marine Robin December 1945 as transport for India-Burma theater return of troops. Converted to container.
- SS Marine Panther - Completed as War Shipping Administration troop ship. Operated October 1944 — May 1946 operating from New York to Europe, then via Suez to India. From New York to India and Philippines to Seattle from which the ship returned to India. Converted to container ship.
- SS Marine Wolf - Completed as War Shipping Administration troop ship operating July 1944 — October 1946 first in Atlantic then departing New York 6 December 1945 for India, Philippines and Los Angeles and Pacific operations. Reserve fleet 1946–1961. Sold, renamed Transglobe converted to container ship. Scrapped Spain 1974.
- SS Marine Raven - Completed as first "Marine" class War Shipping Administration troop ship to carry troops. Operated January 1944 — May 1946. Made 16 New York-Europe trips, then round the world leaving Newport News for India and Philippines to Seattle. Left Seattle via San Francisco to embark German POWs to Europe. Two voyages in European waters before released from transport duties 9 May 1946. Sold private 1961, Panamanian flag November 1973, scrapped 1976.

Marine Robin possibly 1944 on delivery.

- Marine Robin - Completed as War Shipping Administration troop ship. Operated April 1944 — April 1946. First voyage Norfolk to Naples where operated locally for two months. Operated to Europe to October 1945 when transited through Suez to India for Seattle. Operated Pacific to April 1946. Converted to Great Lakes freighter ship in 1952 as the Joseph H. Thompson, then converted to barge 1990.
- SS Marine Walrus - Became hospital ship USS Consolation (AH-15).

==== C4-S-B2 (Todd) ====
Built by Todd Brooklyn:

- SS Marine Hawk - Became USS Haven (AH-12), later sold and converted to chemical carrier.
- SS Marine Lion - Became USS Benevolence later was in collision and sunk in 1950.
- SS Marine Owl - Became hospital ship USS Sanctuary (AH-17) .

==== C4-S-B5 (Sun) ====
Built by Sun Ships in 1945.

- USNS Marine Fiddler (T-AK-267) - Cargo ship, WSA, agent Agwilines Inc, 31 August 1945 — 23 May 1946, laid up Suisun Bay with brief periods of maintenance until 10 December 1952 transfer to Military Sea Transportation Service. MSTS/MSC as USNS until 14 September 1973 lay up in James River, Reserve Fleet. Sold for scrap 2003.
- SS Marine Flier - Cargo ship, WSA, agent American President Lines, 19 May 1945 — July 1946 then commercially operated under charter until title transferred 19 February 1951. Sold May 1955, renamed Keystone State. Delivered for scrapping Taiwan 8 January 1972.
- SS Marine Arrow - Cargo ship, WSA, agent American Hawaiian SS Co., 18 June 1945 — August 1946 then commercially operated under charter until sold 31 January 1951. Sold May 1955, renamed Hoosier State. Delivered for scrapping Taiwan 10 November 1971.
- SS Marine Runner - Cargo ship, WSA, agent American Hawaiian SS Co., 29 September 1945 — December 1946 then commercially operated under charter until title transferred 5 March 1951. Sold March 1955, renamed Wolverine State. Delivered for scrapping Taiwan 29 October 1971.
- SS Marine Star - Cargo ship, WSA, agent American Hawaiian SS Co., 22 July 1945 — August 1946 then commercially operated under charter until laid up James River Reserve Fleet 15 September 1947. Sold 29 June 1951, delivered buyer December 1952 for use as "Laker". Renamed Aquarama July 1955.

==== C4-S-A3 (Kaiser) ====
14,863 DWT ships built by Kaiser Shipyards in Richmond, California, in 1945 and 1946, as WSA troopship.

- USNS Marine Adder (T-AP-193) - sold renamed SS Transcolorado
- SS Marine Perch C4-S-A3 - Completed as War Shipping Administration troop ship. Operated October 1945 — February 1946 allocated to Army requirements in Pacific and Atlantic. 1946 WSA transport requirements. Later Sold private in 1965, in collision and sank 1978.
- SS Marine Swallow C4-S-A3 - Completed as War Shipping Administration troop ship. Operated November 1945 — into 1946 in Pacific. Sold private in 1965, converted to bulk carrier Missouri, Panamanian 1974 named Ogden Missouri, scrapped in 1978.
- Built by Kaiser Shipyards in Vancouver, Washington, in 1945 and 1946, as WSA troopship.
- SS Marine Tiger - Completed as War Shipping Administration troop ship. Operated July 1944 — into 1946 allocated to Army requirements. Pacific service, including January 1946 transport of Italian POWs to Naples from Los Angeles. Returned 20 February, released from Army requirements, one WSA operation to South Africa until placed in reserve fleet 7 May 1946. In 1966 renamed Oakland converted to container ship, scrapped Taiwan September 1973.
- SS Marine Shark - Completed as War Shipping Administration troop ship. Operated September 1945 — 1946. Pacific to 21 February 1946 when sailed from San Francisco to France for operations in Atlantic. Sold private 1968 renamed Charleston converted to container ship, later scrapped.
- SS Marine Cardinal - Completed as War Shipping Administration troop ship. Operated September 1945 — April 1946 returning troops to U.S. from Asia. Sold private in 1964 renamed Baltimore and converted to container ship, later scrapped.
- SS Marine Falcon - Completed as War Shipping Administration troop ship. Operated September 1945 — May 1946 returning troops from Asia including India. Sold private in 1966 renamed Trenton converted to container ship, later scrapped
- SS Marine Flasher - Completed as War Shipping Administration troop ship. Operated September 1945 — April 1946 returning troops from Asia and northern Europe. Also used to bring displaced persons to America. Sold private 1966 renamed Long Beach converted to container ship, later scrapped
- SS Marine Jumper (T-AP-200) - Completed as War Shipping Administration troop ship. Operated October 1945 — May 1946 in Pacific. Sold private 1966 renamed Panama converted to container ship, later scrapped.
- USNS Marine Serpent (T-AP-202) - Completed as War Shipping Administration troop ship. Operated October 1945 — July 1946 in Pacific. 8 May 1952 became Military Sea Transportation Service USNS vessel to 1968. Sold to private in 1968 renamed Galveston converted to container ship, later scrapped.
- SS Ernie Pyle WSA troopship, used for displaced persons (DPs) refugees after World War II, sold private in 1965, scrapped in 1978.
- USNS Marine Carp (T-AP-199) - Completed as War Shipping Administration troop ship. Operated November 1945 — 1946 returning troops to U.S. from Europe, Asia and lastly Barbados.
- USNS Marine Lynx (T-AP-194) - Completed as War Shipping Administration troop ship. Operated December 1945 — May 1946 in Pacific. Commercial operators and reserve fleet to 1950 when operated by Military Sea Transportation Service then layup 1958. Commercial as Transcolumbia 1967 — October 1968 when transferred to Military Sealift Command. Scrapped 1988.
- SS Marine Marlin - Completed as War Shipping Administration troop ship. Operated December 1945 — April 1946 Japan then Puerto Rico and Jamaica. 7 April to 21 October 1949 as U.S. Army Transport carrying refugees and displaced persons from Germany. Prospective MSTS (T-AP-201) but not acquired. Sold converted to passenger ship. In 1965 converted as dry cargo. Scrapped in 1972
- USNS Marine Phoenix (T-AP-195) - Completed as War Shipping Administration troop ship. Operated December 1945 — 1946 in Pacific. Sold commercial renamed Yellowstone July 1965 and converted to bulk carrier. Sank 13 June 1978 off Gibraltar.

==== C4-S-A4 (Kaiser) ====
14,863 DWT ships built by Kaiser Shipyards in Richmond, California, in 1946 for break bulk cargo

- SS Marine Leopard - Sold private in 1951, scrapped in 1972
- SS Marine Snapper - Sold private in 1951, scrapped in 1972

=== Mount series ===
C4-S-A3 14,863 DWT as break bulk cargo ship.

- Built by Kaiser Shipyards in Vancouver, Washington, in 1946.
- SS Mount Davis - Sold private in 1951, scrapped in 1971.
- SS Mount Greylock - Sold private in 1951, scrapped in 1971.
- SS Mount Mansfield - Sold private in 1951, scrapped in 1980.
- SS Mount Rogers - Sold private in 1951, scrapped in 1971.
- SS Mount Whitney - Sold private in 1951, scrapped in 1971. (Seagoing cowboys ship in 1946 and 1947)

=== Named after a person ===
C4-S-A3 14,863 DWT as a break bulk ship in 1946.

- Built by Kaiser Shipyards in Vancouver, Washington.
- SS Scott E. Land - Sold private in 1951, scrapped in 1980
- SS Willis Vickery - Sold private in 1951, scrapped in 1979
- SS Louis McH. Howe - Sold private in 1951, scrapped in 1980
- SS Ernie Pyle - Sold private in 1965, scrapped in 1978

=== Hospital ships ===
C4-S-B2 DWT: 15,300

- Built by Sun Yards in Chester, Pennsylvania, in 1944 and 1945.
- USS Haven (AH-12) (laid down as Marine Hawk)
- USS Benevolence (AH-13) (laid down as Marine Lion)
- USS Tranquility (AH-14) (laid down as Marine Dolphin)
- USS Consolation (AH-15) (laid down as Marine Walrus)
- USS Repose (AH-16) (laid down as Marine Beaver)
- USS Sanctuary (AH-17) (laid down as Marine Owl)

=== M-class ships ===
C4-S-49a 19,799 DWT Four cargo/passenger liners were built for the Grace Line 1963–1964 by Bethlehem Steel Sparrows Point, Maryland.

- SS Santa Magdelena
- SS Santa Mariana
- SS Santa Maria
- SS Santa Mercedes (later renamed: TS Patriot State)

=== Jet-class ships ===
C4-S-49b 13,915 DWT

- Built in 1965 by Bethlehem Steel of Sparrows Point, Maryland. The last two C4 ships were constructed in 1966 for Prudential Lines.
- SS Prudential Seajet
- SS Prudential Oceanjet

== Mariner-class ships ==
Mariner-class break bulk ships were 564 feet (172 m) long with a capacity of 14,000 tons deadweight (DWT). They have speed of 20 knots (37 km/h; 23 mph). They were some of the largest and fastest ships in the world when they were completed. Built between 1952 and 1955.

  - C4-S-1 class
  - Built by Bethlehem Steel Co., SB Division, Quincy, Massachusetts, in 1952.
- Old Colony Mariner
- Cornhusker State Mariner
- Pine Tree Mariner Converted to passenger ship, Mariposa in 1956.
- Nutmeg Mariner
- Wolverine Mariner
  - Bethlehem Steel Co., SB Division, Sparrows Point, Maryland
- Free State Mariner Converted to passenger ship, Monterey in 1957. Renamed *Monte in 2006, scrapped in 2007.
- Mountain Mariner
- Gopher Mariner
- Show Me Mariner
- Sunflower Mariner
  - Built by Bethlehem Pacific Coast Steel Corp., San Francisco, California
- Golden Mariner
  - Built by Ingalls SB Corp., Pascagoula, Mississippi, in 1952.
- Lone Star Mariner
- Evergreen Mariner - Became the USN ship USS Tulare (AKA-112), an attack cargo ship. Scrapped in 2011.
- Magnolia Mariner
- Cotton Mariner
- Pelican Mariner
- Peninsula Mariner
  - Built by Newport News SB & DD Co., Newport News, Virginia, in 1952.
- Old Dominium Mariner
- Tar Heel Mariner
- Volunteer Mariner
- Palmetto Mariner
- Cracker State Mariner
  - Built by New York SB Corp., Camden, New Jersey, in 1953.
- Garden Mariner
- Diamond Mariner - Became the USN ship USS Paul Revere (APA-248), an attack transport ship.
- Empire State Mariner - Became the USN ship USS Observation Island as a missile range instrumentation ship and later a missile test platform until 2014.
- Prairie Mariner - Became the USN ship USS Francis Marion (APA-249), an attack transport ship.
- Silver Mariner
  - Built by Sun SB & DD Co., Chester, Pennsylvania, in 1953.
- Keystone Mariner
- Buckeye Mariner
- Hoosier Mariner
- Bagder Mariner - Converted to passenger ship, SS Atlantic in 1953.
- Hawkeye Mariner
  - Built by Bethlehem Pacific Coast Steel Corp., San Francisco, California, in 1953

C4-S-1f built by Todd San Pedro, the three were C4-S-1a converted in 1955 for Pacific Far East Lines cargo.

- Golden Bear
- Korean Bear
- Japan Bear
  - Built by Bethlehem Steel Co., Key Highway Yard, Baltimore, Maryland, in 1953

C4-S-1h Conversion for break bulk ships for American President Lines in 1955.

- President Hayes (IV) (Old Dominium Mariner)
- President Jackson (IV) (Volunteer Mariner)
- President Adams (IV) (Palmetto Mariner)
- President Coolidge (II) (Cracker State Mariner)

C4-S-1t

  - Built by Bethlehem Shipbuilding Corporation in San Francisco in 1962 for Pacific Far East Lines
- China Bear, scrapped 1986
- Philippine Bear, scrapped 1986

== Mail ships ==
C4-S-1s received new 105-foot (32 m) midbodies at Bethlehem Steel's San Francisco yard, this increasing their length from 564 feet (172 m) to 669 feet (204 m). New bow thrusters were also installed. Operator American Mail Line. 20,200 DWT. Built in 1962.

- Washington Mail - Became SS Equality State (T-ACS-8)
- Japan Mail Became SS Diamond State (T-ACS-7)
- Philippine Mail Converted to containership in 1971, renamed President Eisenhower in 1975, then Santa Paula in 1983, then American Banker in 1985 and scrapped in 2004.

== State ships ==
- Built by Newport News for States SS Company in 1962. 14,600 DWT.

C4-S-1u

- California
- Oregon
- Washington
- Hawaii

== African ships ==
Built by Ingalls Shipbuilders for Farrell Lines. 20,100 DWT. C4-S-58a

- African Comet
- African Meteor
- African Mercury Used in a location shot for the movie The French Connection
- African Neptune
- African Dawn
- African Sun

== American ships ==
Built by Newport News for States SS Company in 1959. 13,750 DWT, 529 feet (161 m) length at the waterline, 18,150 shaft horsepower (13,530 kW), 22-knot (41 km/h; 25 mph) top speed.

- C4-S-57a
- American Challenger - Renamed the Pioneer Moon. Scrapped in 1988
- American Charger - Scrapped in 1988
- American Champion - Scrapped in 1988
- American Chieftain - Scrapped in 1988

Built by Sun Ship for United States Lines in 1964 and 1965. 13,750 DWT.

- C4-S-64a
- American Rover - Scrapped in 2004
- American Racer
- American Ranger - Scrapped in 2004
- American Reliance
- American Resolute - Scrapped in 2004

Built by Beth Quincy for United States Lines in 1962 and 1963. 13,750 DWT.

- C4-S-57a
- American Courier - Scrapped in 1988
- American Commander - Scrapped in 1988
- American Corsair - Scrapped in 1988
- American Contractor - Scrapped in 1988
- American Contender - Scrapped in 1988
- American Crusader - Scrapped in 1988

== Ro-Ro ships ==
Built by for the USN in 1967. One roll-on/roll-off ship in class C4-ST-67a

- USNS Sea Lift (T-LSV-9)

== Notable incidents ==
- Marine Perch a C4-S-A3, was renamed SS Yellowstone. Yellowstone was in a collision with the Algerian freighter MV IBN Batoutaand and sank on 12 June 1978, 14 miles (23 km) southeast of Gibraltar in the Mediterranean Sea in dense fog. Five crewmen on Yellowstone were killed and two were injured, none on IBN Batoutaand. The bow of IBN Batoutaand struck deep into Yellowstone.
- Marine Lion a C4-S-B2, was renamed to USS Benevolence, a hospital ship. On 25 August 1950 she sank after a in collision with the freighter SS Mary Luckenbach in heavy fog off San Francisco. Of the crew of 550, 23 were lost in the sinking.
- USS General Omar Bundy, built in 1944, was sold a few times and renamed SS Poet. In 1980 she went missing without a trace and is presumed sunk. her cargo was 13,500 tons of bulk corn that she loaded at Girard Point Terminal in South Philadelphia, she was to steam to Port Said, Egypt. There was a severe storm in the Atlantic Ocean at the time she vanished and she was low in the water with her heavy load.
- SS Cornhusker Mariner ran aground on the night of 6 and 7 July 1953 in the typhoon "Kit" as it passed close to Pusan Harbor.

== See also ==
- Type C1 ship
- Type C2 ship
- Type C3 ship
- Type R ship
- T1 tanker
- T2 tanker
- T3 tanker
- Liberty ship
- Victory ship
- Hog Islander
- U.S. Merchant Marine Academy

== Bibliography ==
- American Merchant Marine at War - C4 ships
- Charles, Roland W., Troopships of World War II (1947), The Army Transportation Association
- MARAD Vessel History Database
- US Maritime Commission Details and Outboard Profiles of Maritime Commission Vessels, The C4 Cargo Ship, Conversions and Subdesigns
- US Maritime Commission overview
- US Maritime Commission - Technical Specifications for Ships including definitions of terms
- From America to United States: The History of the long-range Merchant Shipbuilding Programme of the United States Maritime Commission, by L.A. Sawyer and W.H. Mitchell. London, 1981, World Ship Society
- Ships for Victory: A History of Shipbuilding under the U.S. Maritime Commission in World War II, by Frederic C. Lane ISBN 0-8018-6752-5
