= SS Marine Marlin =

History
- Operator: War Shipping Administration (1945–1946); United States Lines (1946–); Green Bay (1965–1972)
- Builder: Kaiser Shipyards
- Yard number: 511
- Launched: 1945
- Completed: October 1945
- Maiden voyage: Bremen-New York, 7–16 September 1946
- Fate: Scrapped 1972

General characteristics
- Type: C4-S-A3 troop transport (1945–1946); Passenger ship (1946–); Dry cargo ship (1965–1972)
- Tonnage: 12,410 GRT
- Length: 523 ft (159 m)
- Beam: 71.7 ft (21.9 m)
- Capacity: 3,485 troops (1945–1946); 926 tourist class passengers (1946–1949)

SS Marine Marlin was a type C4-S-A3 ship built in 1945 by Kaiser Shipyards, Vancouver, Washington, as a troop transport ship. She had a capacity to carry 3,485 troops and was built for operation by the War Shipping Administration. The ship's first voyage from Portland, Oregon on 5 December 1945 to Yokohama, Japan was followed by a shift to the Atlantic arriving at New York on 26 February 1946. From then the ship operated as a transport to Puerto Rico and Jamaica to New York and Charleston.

After the war, she, along with many of her sister ships, spent a few years ferrying refugees and repatriating soldiers from the war. In 1946 she was chartered to the United States Lines and fitted to carry 926 tourist class passengers. She made her first voyage, from Bremen to New York City, 7–16 September 1946, carrying "more than 500 Jewish immigrants from the United States zone of Germany" including "ten orphaned Jewish children...brought... under the sponsorship of the United States Committee for the care of European Children".

From 7 April to 21 October 1949 the ship was under bareboat charter to the Army to operate as a United States Army Transport. She completed her last Bremen to New York crossing, on 17 July 1949, on which passengers were mostly from Stuttgart, Germany, and were of Armenian descent. This ship completed a Bremerhaven to New York crossing on August 20, 1949, with Displaced Persons from Ulm an der Donau, Darmstadt Germany.

In 1952 she was intended to be transferred to the U.S. Navy as a transport but was not acquired.

In 1965 she was converted to a dry cargo ship for Central Gulf Steamship Corp. and renamed Green Bay. On 17 August 1971, she was sunk in Qui Nonh harbor after an underwater explosion caused by Viet Cong frogmen while discharging military supplies. On 1 September 1971, she was refloated and towed to Hong Kong where she was scrapped in 1972.
