= Haven-class hospital ship =

Class of American hospital ships

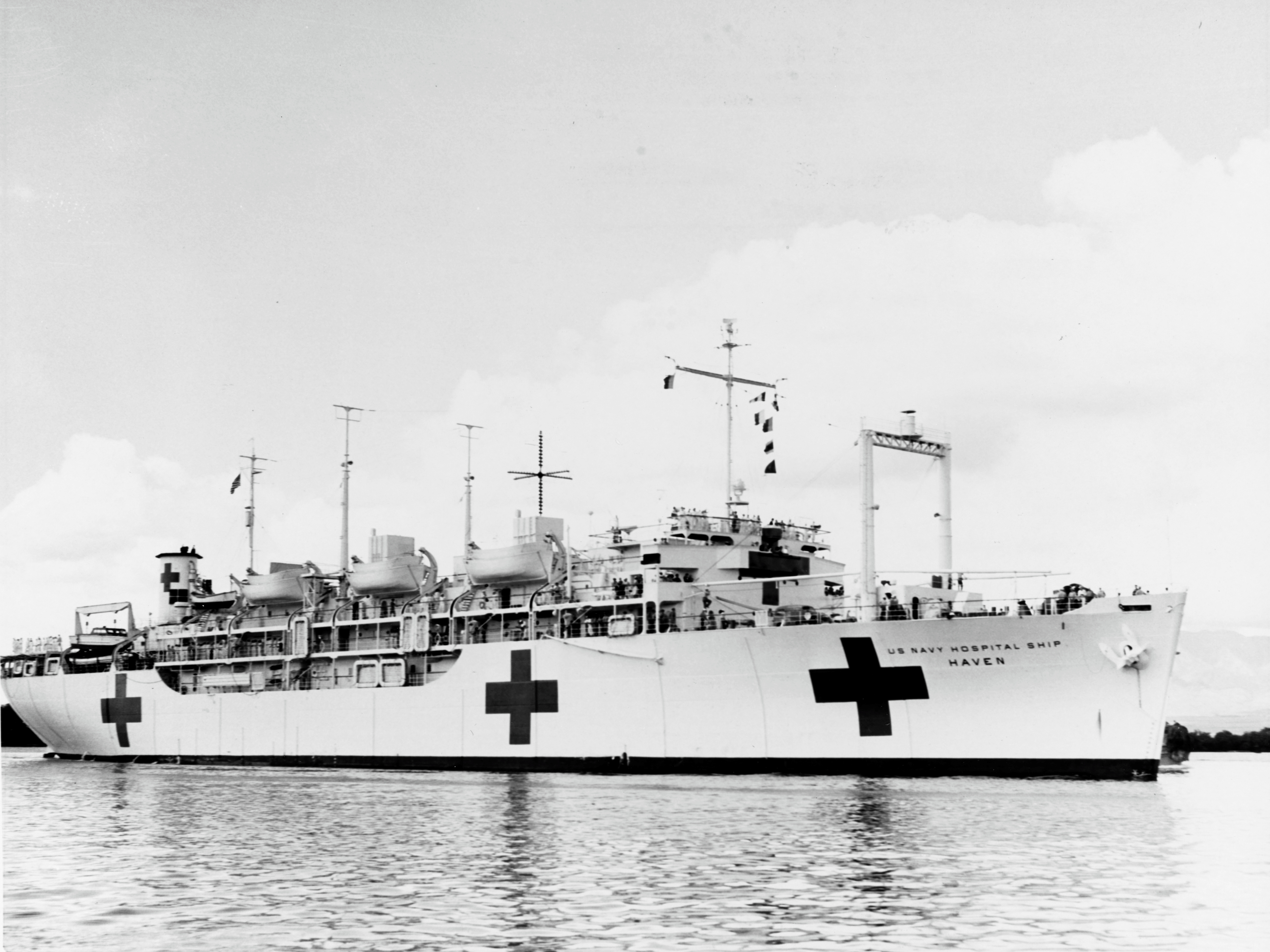
- USS Haven, the lead ship of her class, seen here in 1954.

Class overview
- Name: Haven class
- Operators: United States Navy
- Succeeded by: Mercy class
- Built: 1943–1944
- In service: 1944–1989
- Planned: 6
- Completed: 6
- Lost: 1
- Retired: 5

General characteristics as built
- Type: Hospital ship
- Displacement: 11,141 long tons (11,320 t) standard; 15,400 long tons (15,600 t) full load
- Length: 520 ft (160 m)
- Beam: 71 ft 6 in (21.79 m)
- Draft: 24 ft (7.3 m)
- Propulsion: Geared turbine, single screw
- Speed: 18.3 knots (33.9 km/h; 21.1 mph)
- Capacity: 802 patients
- Complement: 568–574

The Haven class of hospital ships were built for the United States Navy (USN) during World War II. Haven-class ships also served in the Korean War and the Vietnam War. They were among the first ships to be able to receive casualties directly by helicopter and were the first fully air conditioned ships in the USN. The first ship was laid down in July 1943, while the last was launched in August 1944. In that span the United States produced six Haven-class hospital ships. The last Haven-class ship was struck from the Naval Vessel Register in 1989. One ship sank in a collision in 1950; the five others were scrapped. Haven-class hospital ships were replaced with the Mercy-class hospital ships.

== Design and description ==
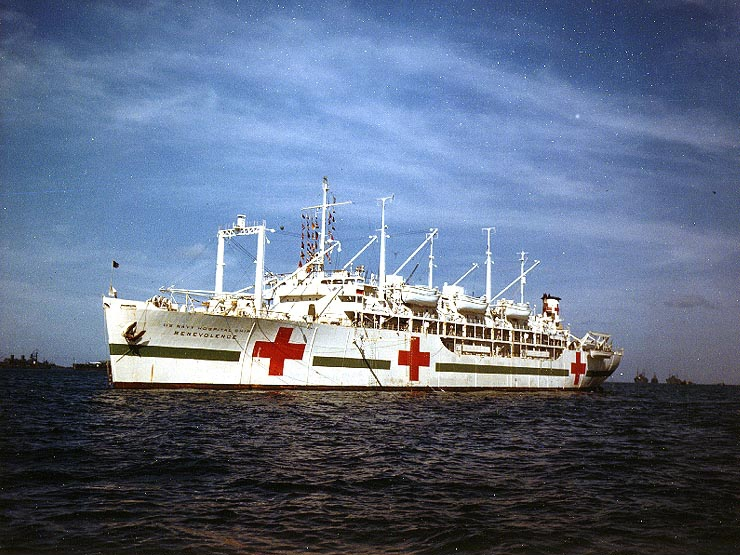
Benevolence moored in Bikini Atoll lagoon, during Operation Crossroads, in mid-July 1946.

The class was based upon the United States Maritime Commission's (MARCOM) Type C4 ship (as C4-S-B2 design). The six hospital ships of the Haven class had a standard displacement of 11,141 long tons (11,320 t) and a full load displacement of 15,400 long tons (15,600 t). They measured 496 feet (151 m) long at the waterline and 520 ft (160 m) long overall with a beam of 71 ft 6 in (21.79 m) and a maximum draft of 24 ft (7.3 m). The ships were propelled by a single shaft driven by General Electric geared turbines powered by steam from two Babcock & Wilcox boilers, creating 9,000 shaft horsepower (6,700 kW). This gave the vessels a maximum speed of 18.3 knots (33.9 km/h; 21.1 mph). They had a complement of between 568 and 574. The vessels could handle 802 patients during World War II. The ships were air conditioned.

=== Modifications ===
After the war, the ships had a landing platform added aft to allow for the medical evacuation of patients by helicopter except for Benevolence. In 1967–1968 Sanctuary was modernised and the vessel's hospital capacity was shrunk to 750 beds, with a crew of 375 including 17 officers and 323 hospital staff including 24 doctors, 29 nurses, 3 dentists and 258 medical corpsmen. The vessel underwent further modification in 1972–1973 when its designation was changed to "dependent support ship" and had special facilities for obstetrics, gynecology, maternity and nursery services and became the first ship with a mixed male-female crew.

== Ships in class ==
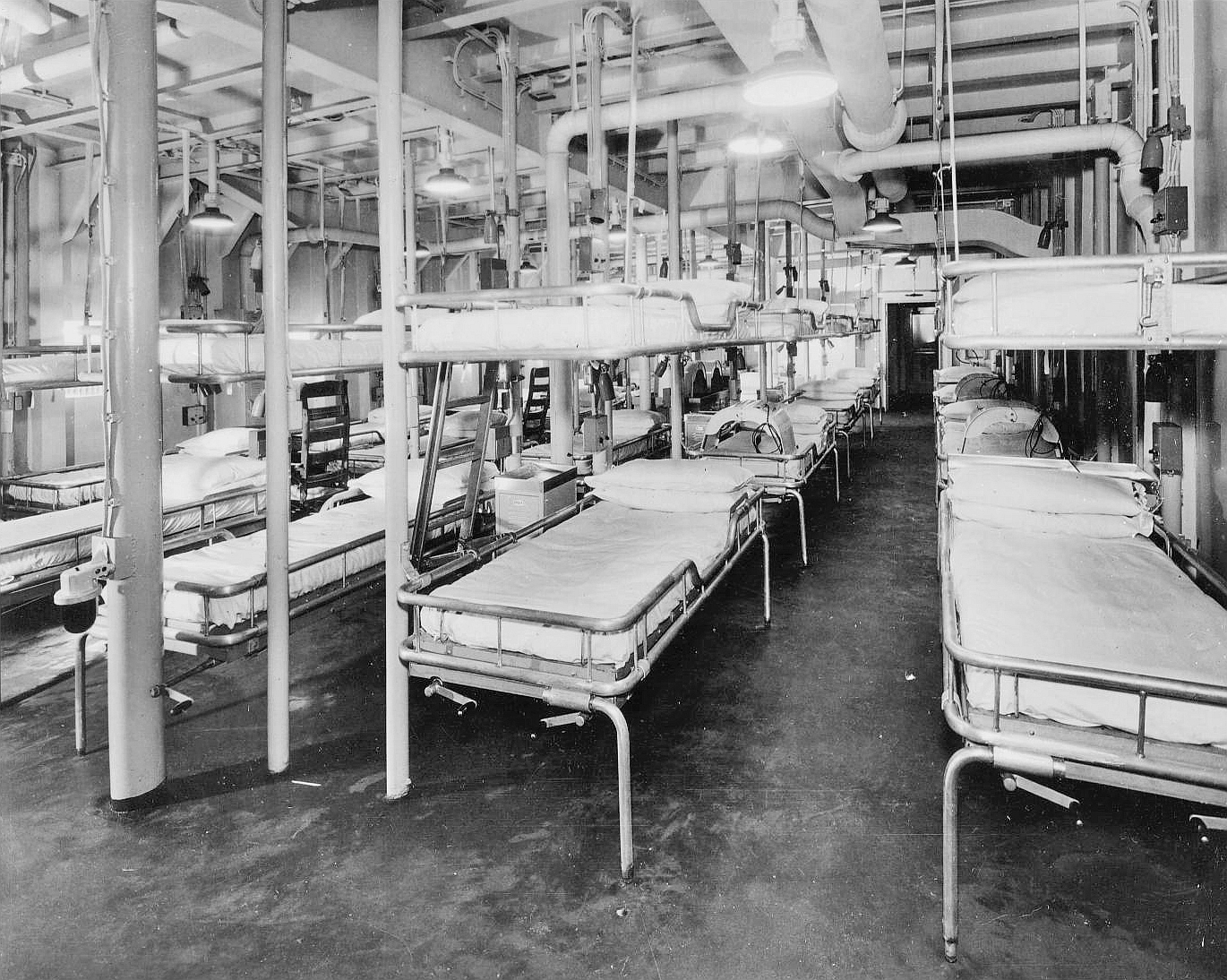
A 52-bed ward aboard Repose

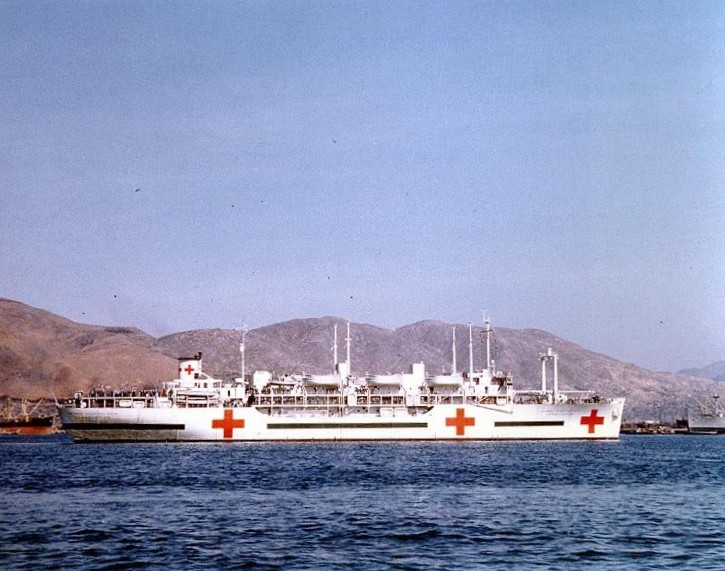
Consolation off Korea in 1952

Haven class construction data
Hull number	Name	Builder	Laid down	Launched	Commissioned	Fate
AH-12	Haven (ex-Marine Hawk)	Sun Shipbuilding & Drydock Company	1 July 1943	24 June 1944	5 May 1945	Sold to private interests 1969, renamed Alaskan, scrapped in 1987–1988.
AH-13	Benevolence (ex-Marine Lion)	Sun Shipbuilding & Drydock Company	26 July 1943	10 July 1944	12 May 1945	Sunk 1950 off California coast after collision.
AH-14	Tranquillity (ex-Marine Dolphin)	Sun Shipbuilding & Drydock Company	20 August 1943	25 July 1944	24 April 1945	Sold for scrap 15 July 1974.
AH-15	Consolation (ex-Marine Walrus)	Sun Shipbuilding & Drydock Company	24 September 1943	1 August 1944	22 May 1945	1960 chartered for private use and renamed Hope. Returned to USN and sold for scrap 1975.
AH-16	Repose (ex-Marine Beaver)	Sun Shipbuilding & Drydock Company	22 October 1943	8 August 1944	26 May 1945	Sold for scrap 1975.
AH-17	Sanctuary (ex-Marine Owl)	Sun Shipbuilding & Drydock Company	22 November 1943	15 August 1944	20 June 1945	Sold to private interests in 1989. Scrapped in 2011–2012.

== Construction and career ==
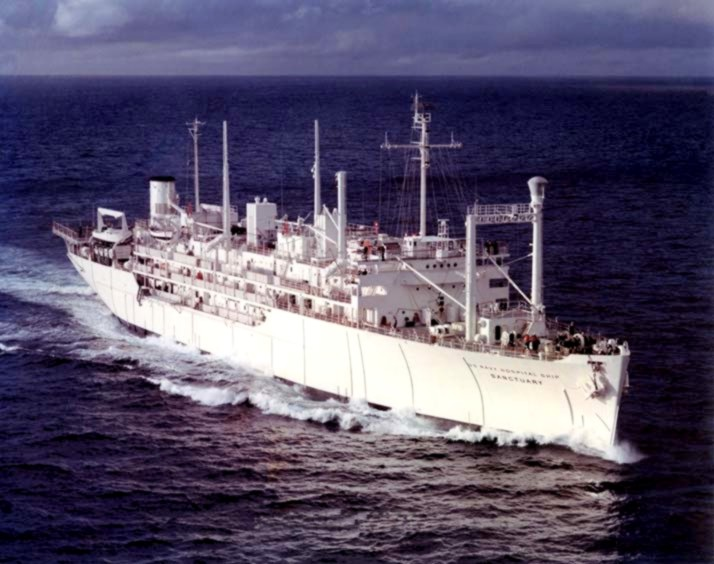
USNS Sanctuary in 1973

The Haven-class ships were initially constructed initially as MARCOM Type C4 standard cargo ships and were given standard cargo ship names. However, their hulls were chosen for conversion to hospital ships on 22 June 1944. The ships were all given names implying comfort and help. The first two ships of the class were completed in time to serve in the Pacific Theater during World War II. All five ships served in the repatriation of troops and former prisoners of war to the United States in the immediate postwar era. Haven and Benevolence were assigned to Operation Crossroads, a series of nuclear weapon tests. Haven and Benevolence were placed in reserve in following tests, but were reactivated for the Korean War. During the reactivation process, Benevolence was struck by a merchant ship while re-entering harbor and was sunk in August 1950. 18 people were killed and 13 reported missing. The rest of the hospital ships served in the Korean War, with Consolation being the first hospital ship to accept helicopter evacuations for casualties directly from the battlefield. Following the end of the war, all of the ships ended up placed out of commission in reserve. Consolation was chartered by the People to People Health Foundation in 1960 and operated by American President Lines offering medical treatment to undeveloped regions of the world. The ship was renamed Hope during this charter. Repose and Sanctuary were reactivated for service in the Vietnam War.

In 1969 Haven was sold to private interests, converted to a chemical tanker and renamed Clendenin and then Alaskan. Tranquillity was sold for scrap in 1974. After being returned to the USN, Consolation was sold for scrap in 1975. Repose was taken out of service in 1970 and sold for scrap in 1975. Sanctuary underwent modernisation in 1972–1973 for a planned deployment to Piraeus, Greece. Re-designated a "dependent support ship", the ship was intended to provide medical and other services to the dependents of American service personnel stationed at Piraeus, in conjunction with the planned homeporting of an aircraft carrier and six destroyers in the Greek city. However, the deployment was cancelled but Sanctuary became the first USN ship to deploy with a mixed male-female crew. Sanctuary was placed in reserve in 1975 and remained there until being sold in 1989 to private interests. Initially the ship's planned use was as a floating hospital in Africa, but the plan failed. Then, the vessel was used as a drug rehabilitation facility at Baltimore, Maryland. Finally, the last Haven-class ship, the ex-Sanctuary was sold for scrap in 2011. Haven-class hospital ships were replaced with the Mercy-class hospital ships.

== See also ==
- List of United States Navy hospital ships
- Comfort-class hospital ship
