= USNS Marine Fiddler =

History

United States
- Name: Marine Fiddler
- Builder: Sun Shipbuilding & Drydock Co.
- Laid down: 15 December 1944
- Launched: 15 May 1945
- Acquired: 31 August 1945
- In service: 1945
- Out of service: 14 July 1973
- Stricken: 31 March 1986
- Identification: IMO number: 8450639; Ship International Radio Callsign: NNYC
- Fate: Scrapped

General characteristics
- Displacement: 22,094 long tons (22,449 t) (full)
- Length: 520 ft (160 m)
- Beam: 72 ft (22 m)
- Draft: 33 ft (10 m)
- Propulsion: steam turbine, single propeller, 9,000 shp (6,700 kW)
- Speed: 17.5 knots (32.4 km/h; 20.1 mph)
- Complement: 57 Merchant Marine

USNS Marine Fiddler was an Alchiba-class cargo ship that served the United States Merchant Marine during the Korean War and Vietnam War. Laid down on 15 December 1944 as a Maritime Commission type C4-S-A3 hull, under Maritime Commission contract (MC hull 753), she was built at Sun Shipbuilding and Drydock Company in Chester, Pennsylvania. She was launched on 15 May 1945 and delivered 31 August 1945. Operated by Agwilines Inc, she was laid up in the National Defense Reserve Fleet in Suisun Bay, California on 23 May 1946.

== Service with Maritime Administration ==
From 7 February to 27 March 1952, Marine Fiddler was activated and operated by American President Lines for the Maritime Administration before returning to the Reserve Fleet at Suisun Bay. On 8 October 1952, she was again reactivated by MARAD and was operated by American President Lines. Marine Fiddler was acquired by the Navy 10 December 1952 and was designated T‑AK‑267. The ship, under control of MSTS Pacific, provided support for American and UN forces in Korea combating Communist aggression. Converted to a heavy lift cargo ship 29 March 1954, she saw worldwide service, carrying oversized and bulky equipment in her special holds.

=== Vietnam War era ===
In 1960, she carried the components for the portable nuclear power plant, which was installed at Thule AFB, Greenland. On 4 December 1962, the ship rescued the crew of the storm‑damaged sloop Seascape, which was drifting 355 miles (571 km) east of Cape Hatteras. The AK carried the French bathyscaphe Archimedes from Toulon, France, to San Juan, Puerto Rico, in April 1964. The heavy bathyscaphe was being used in oceanographic research operations in the Puerto Rican Trench. When U.S. forces left France in early 1967, Marine Fiddler, with other MSTS ships, transported heavy equipment to other bases in Europe. The heavy lift cargo ship continued to supply American oversea bases in the Atlantic and Mediterranean areas, with occasional special cargo runs to Southeast Asia into 1969. Marine Fiddler was under the operational control of MSTS Atlantic.

=== Ship's disposal ===
The ship would continue to serve the Asia-Pacific region for three more years before finally being brought out of service on 14 July 1973 for layup in the James River National Defense Reserve Fleet in Lee Hall, Virginia. On 31 March 1986, she was struck from the Naval Register and her title was transferred to the Maritime Administration on 26 October 1989. The ship remained there for an additional 14 years before being towed to Bay Bridge Enterprises on 30 October 2003. By 13 November 2004, she was listed as scrapped.

== Ship awards ==
- National Defense Service Medal for Korean War and Vietnam War service.

== See also ==
- List of auxiliaries of the United States Navy
