= USS Haven =

US Navy hospital ship

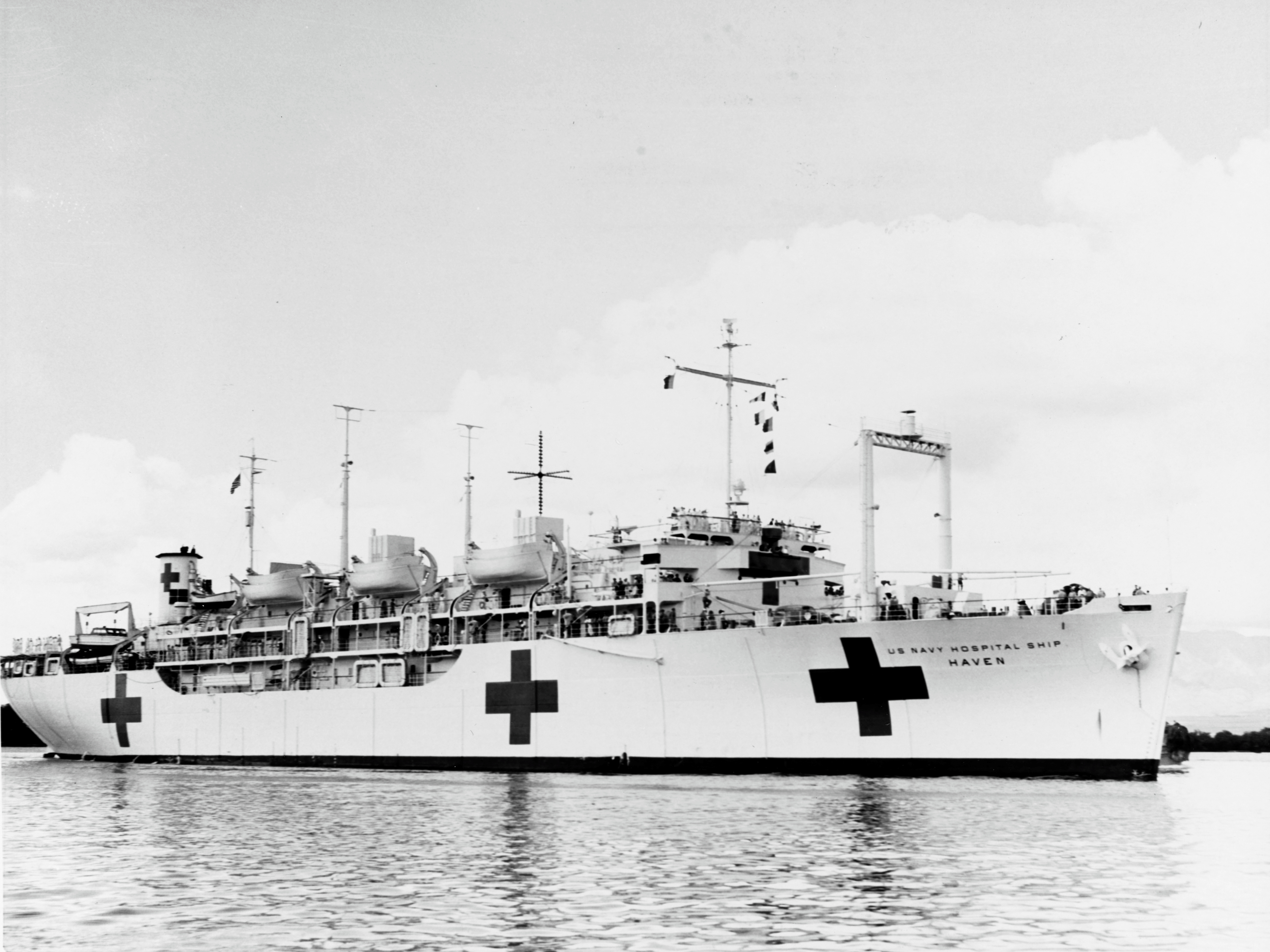
- USS Haven (AH-12) anchored in Inchon Harbor

History

United States
- Ordered: 19 February 1942
- Laid down: 1 July 1943 as SS Marine Hawk
- Launched: 24 June 1944
- Acquired: 19 June 1944
- Commissioned: 5 May 1945; 15 September 1950
- Decommissioned: 1 July 1947; 30 June 1957
- Reclassified: APH-112, June–October 1946
- Stricken: 1 March 1967
- Home port: Long Beach, California
- Identification: IMO number: 6929296
- Honors and awards: American Campaign Medal; Asiatic–Pacific Campaign Medal; World War II Victory Medal; Navy Occupation Service Medal (with Asia clasp); National Defense Service Medal; Korean Service Medal (9); United Nations Service Medal; Korean War Service Medal (retroactive)
- Fate: Scrapped in 1987
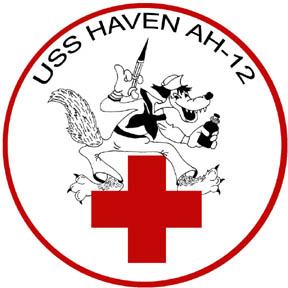
- Badge

General characteristics
- Class & type: Haven-class hospital ship
- Displacement: 11,141 tons empty (15,100 max)
- Length: 520 ft (158.5 m); 665 ft (202.7 m) after 1968
- Beam: 71 ft 6 in (21.79 m)
- Draft: 24 ft (7.3 m)
- Propulsion: Geared Turbine, Single Screw
- Speed: 17.5 knots
- Capacity: 800 patients
- Complement: 95 Officers 606 men
- Armament: None
- Aircraft carried: 1 MEDEVAC helicopter

USS Haven (AH-12) was the lead ship of her class of hospital ships built for the U.S. Navy during World War II. Laid down as SS Marine Hawk, she was transferred from the Maritime Commission for conversion to a hospital ship, and served in that capacity through the end of the war. She was redesignated APH-112 (evacuation transport) in June 1946 for participation in Operation Crossroads, returning to her original AP-12 designation in October 1946. Haven participated in the Korean War and eventually ended her military career acting as a floating hospital in Long Beach, California. She was later converted to a chemical carrier and scrapped in 1987.

== Operational history ==
=== World War II ===
Initially named SS Marine Hawk, Haven was launched under Maritime Commission contract by Sun Shipbuilding & Drydock Co., Chester, Pennsylvania, on June 24, 1944. Acquired and placed in service from June 15th to June 19th in 1944 for transportation to her conversion yard, Todd-Erie Shipyard, in Brooklyn. Upon completion of her conversion for Navy use, she was commissioned on May 5, 1945.

Following shakedown training, the hospital ship sailed on June 14, 1945, via the Panama Canal for the Pacific Theater, where the war was reaching its climax. Reaching Pearl Harbor on July 6, 1945, the ship brought patients on board for return to San Francisco. After returning to Hawaii on August 11, 1945, just prior to the Japanese surrender, the USS Haven sailed to Okinawa and Nagasaki. She arrived off the destroyed Japanese city on September 11, 1945, and brought on board a group of allied ex-prisoners of war, some of them suffering from the effects of the atomic blast. During the remainder of 1945 the ship was engaged in transporting patients from Guam, Saipan, and Pearl Harbor to San Francisco, arriving after her second long voyage on January 31, 1946.

At San Francisco, the USS Haven took on radiological equipment and scientific researchers in preparation for the forthcoming atomic tests in the Pacific, Operation Crossroads. She sailed on May 29th for Pearl Harbor and arrived at Bikini Atoll on June 12, 1946, temporarily re-designated as APH-112. The ship remained in the test area supervising the medical aspects of the experiments throughout the operation and arrived at Kwajalein Atoll on August 26th to assist in the inspection of the test ships.

Haven departed 10 October for Pearl Harbor and the United States, and upon her arrival and decontamination was assigned once again to transport troops from the Pacific outposts to California as AH-12. This important duty occupied her until February 1947, when she reported to San Diego and was decommissioned 1 July. Haven entered the Pacific Reserve Fleet, San Diego group.

=== Korean War ===
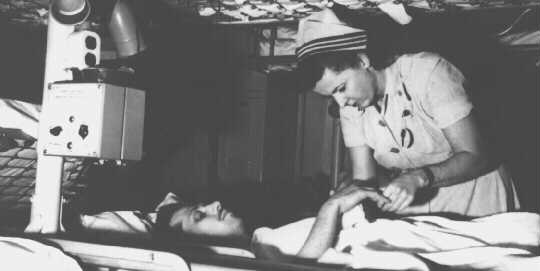
Nurse and patient in ward on Haven, 1950

With the outbreak of the Korean War, hospital ships were desperately needed. Following the sinking of sister ship USS Benevolence (AH-13) off fog-bound San Francisco in August 1950, Haven was taken out of reserve and commissioned 15 September 1950. She sailed 25 September via Pearl Harbor for Inchon, Korea, site of one of the most audacious and skillful amphibious operations in history. The hospital ship remained off Inchon, caring for casualties until 6 January 1951, when the attacking Chinese Communists forced her to move further south. She steamed via Pusan to Sasebo, Japan.

Haven returned to Pusan on 5 February to care for battle casualties, and after another voyage to Inchon remained at Pusan until she sailed for the United States, arriving at San Francisco 30 October 1951. Eager to get back into action, however, she began her second tour of Korean duty 7 January 1952. She operated off Inchon and Pusan during the months that followed, receiving many of her patients by helicopters directly from the front lines on two floating helicopter landing pads with one moored on each side midway down her hull. Haven sailed again for the United States 16 September 1952, and, after the installation of a new flight deck to facilitate helicopter evacuation of patients, once more steamed out of San Diego 24 January 1953. She returned to her regular station in Inchon harbor where during the next 7 months she treated almost 3,000 patients.

The veteran hospital ship sailed for the United States 20 August 1953, and, after her arrival at San Francisco 3 September, operated off the coast of California. She began her fourth tour of duty in Korea 4 January 1954, arriving at Inchon 7 February to provide regular medical care for troops. Haven also made occasional visits to Japan; and on 1 September with Korea in a state of uneasy truce, she was ordered to French Indochina, arriving at Saigon 9 September. There she brought French troops on board as Viet Nam was partitioned and the French army withdrawn. Haven sailed to Oran and Marseille in October to disembark the soldiers, and completing her round-the-world voyage arrived at Long Beach via the Panama Canal 1 November 1954.

==== Korean War campaigns ====
Haven won nine battle stars for its part in the Korean war, participating in the following campaigns:

North Korean Aggression

17 October to 2 November 1950

Second Korean Winter

30 January to 20 March 1952

Communist China Aggression

3 November 1959-(?) to 9 January 1951

Korean Defense Summer-Fall 1952

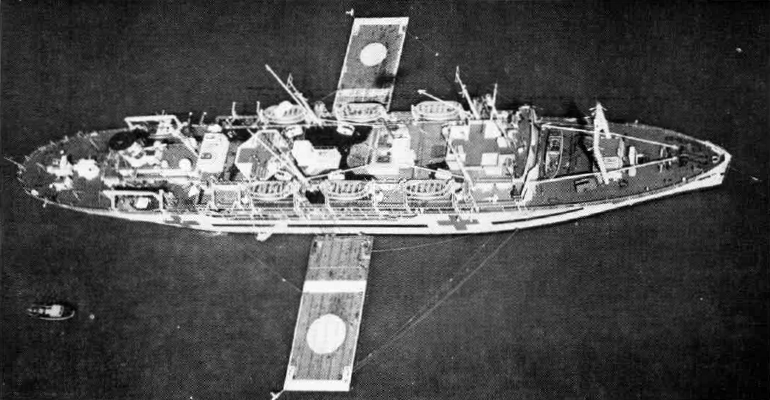
Haven with helicopter landing platforms moored on each side, 1952

1 May to 28 June 1952
19 July to 24 August 1952

First UN Counter Offensive

5 February to 2 April 1951

Third Korean Winter

10 February to 6 April 1953
26 to 30 April 1953

Communist China Spring Offensive

26 April to 8 July 1951

Korea Summer-Fall 1953

1 May to 17 June 1953
9 to 27 July 1953

UN Summer-Fall Offensive

9 July to 22 August 1951
9 September to 7 October 1951

=== Later career ===
Haven took part in fleet maneuvers and provided hospital services for sailors through 1955 and 1956 and decommissioned at Long Beach 30 June 1957. She was placed in an "In Reserve, In Service" status, and remained moored at Long Beach acting as a floating hospital. During this time she served as a backdrop for the CBS television series Hennesey. She had also appeared in the background of scenes shot at the Long Beach Naval Shipyard for the film D-Day the Sixth of June, filmed in 1956.

She was struck from the Navy List on 1 March 1967. Haven was returned to the Maritime Administration Reserve Fleet on 5 June 1967.

Type C4-class ships of like Haven were then in demand for commercial service because of their relatively large size and engines-aft configuration. Haven was sold by the Maritime Administration in 1968, lengthened by 145 feet (44.2 m), and converted into the chemical carrier Clendenin. Renamed Alaskan upon completion of conversion, she served with Union Carbide until sold for scrap in 1987.

== Additional ==
The U.S. Naval Sea Cadet Corps (USNSCC) has a unit commissioned named after the USS Haven. The units name is Haven Division located in San Pedro, CA.
