= USS A. Houghton =

Cargo ship of the United States Navy

History

United States
- Name: USS A. Houghton
- Launched: 1852
- Acquired: 12 October 1861
- Commissioned: 19 February 1862
- Decommissioned: 9 June 1865
- Fate: Sold, 10 August 1865

General characteristics
- Type: Bark
- Tonnage: 326
- Length: 113 ft 4 in (34.54 m)
- Beam: 25 ft 3 in (7.70 m)
- Depth of hold: 12 ft (3.7 m)
- Propulsion: Sail
- Speed: 13 kn (15 mph; 24 km/h)
- Complement: 27
- Armament: 2 × 32-pounder smoothbore guns

USS A. Houghton – a 326 ton bark – was purchased during the beginning of the American Civil War by the Union Navy.

A. Houghton served throughout the war against the Confederate States of America as an ammunition ship, supporting the Union fleet. Towards the end of the war, she served as a storeship and as a health ship whose task it was to restore post-operative wounded personnel back to health.

== Built in Maine in 1852 ==
A. Houghton – a bark built in 1852 by James P. Rideout at Robbinston, Maine – was purchased by the Navy on 12 October 1861 at New York City and – after being fitted out at the New York Navy Yard – was placed in commission on 19 February 1862.

== Civil War service ==
=== Assigned to the West Gulf blockade ===
Nine days before, on 10 February, the bark was slated for duty in the Mortar Flotilla of the West Gulf Blockading Squadron. That bombardment group, led by Commander David Dixon Porter, was being established to provide covering fire for Flag Officer David Farragut during his forthcoming campaign against New Orleans, Louisiana.

Soon after being commissioned, the bark departed New York Harbor and proceeded via Key West, Florida, and Ship Island, Mississippi, to the Mississippi Delta where she waited while Farragut and his squadron were laboring to get his deep-draft, oceangoing warships across the bar and into the river.

In mid-April, after this difficult task had been completed, she accompanied Porter's mortar schooners upstream to a point a short distance below Forts Jackson and St. Philip, which guarded the river, approaches to New Orleans, Louisiana, from the sea. There, she supplied Porter's guns with ammunition as they shelled the Confederate works during the days preceding the bold dash of Farragut's steam-propelled men-of-war past the guns of the forts to capture New Orleans.

=== New Orleans falls to Union forces ===
After the great Southern metropolis fell, A. Houghton retired with the Flotilla to the Gulf of Mexico to await Farragut and join him in a planned attack on Mobile, Alabama. However, orders from Washington, D.C. directed Farragut to ascend the Mississippi River past the Confederate river fortress at Vicksburg, Mississippi, and join forces with Flag Officer Charles Henry Davis who had been fighting his way down the Mississippi River from its confluence with the Ohio River.

=== Supporting the attack on Vicksburg ===
Knowing the strength of the South's position at Vicksburg, Farragut ordered Porter to bring the flotilla back to the Mississippi so that it might support him in operations against Vicksburg as it had done in his advance on New Orleans. A. Houghton accompanied the flotilla as it returned to the Mississippi and supported it late in June during its bombardment of Vicksburg's batteries while Farragut's ships ran the gauntlet through the fire of the Southern guns. Then, after descending the river to replenish her supply of ammunition, she left New Orleans on 3 July, towed back upstream by the merchant steamer Empire Parish.

On the 6th, while the two ships were passing Grand Gulf, Mississippi, Southern batteries fired upon them and scored several hits, wounding two men. However, A. Houghton immediately returned the fire to good effect. In later describing the action, Lieutenant George Henry Preble – who commanded Union gunboat Katahdin which heard the firing and steamed downstream in the hope of assisting any embattled Northern forces – commented:

They thought the Houghton an unarmed transport, or would not have fired at her. For once they caught a tartar.

The bark's fire knocked out one of the Southern guns and inflicted several casualties – both killed and wounded.

=== Union difficulties in Virginia ===
Meanwhile, events were taking place in Virginia, which would seriously weaken and ultimately disestablish the Mortar Flotilla. In a brilliant series of actions near Richmond, Virginia, – known to history as the Seven Days campaign – General Robert E. Lee's Army of Northern Virginia turned back General George McClellan's thrust against the Confederate capital and drove the battered Union troops of the Army of the Potomac into a precariously held position on the north bank of the James River called Harrison's Landing.

To help protect McClellan's beleaguered army, whose very existence was threatened, U.S. Secretary of the Navy Gideon Welles ordered a dozen of the schooners to leave the Mississippi River and to sail north to reinforce the James River Flotilla which was protecting McClellan's flanks and keeping Lee's victorious troops at bay.

=== Reassigned to Pensacola, Florida ===
A. Houghton was one of the small numbers of Porter's vessels that remained in the West, but thereafter her role was changed. In mid-July, when a lack of ground forces to take and hold Vicksburg had convinced Farragut of the futility of his operations above Vicksburg, he again ran through the fire of the Southern guns and descended the river.

A. Houghton accompanied him downstream to New Orleans and then was sent to Pensacola, Florida, where she served as ammunition ship for the squadron until she sailed far north in the early autumn. She was decommissioned at the New York Navy Yard on 12 October and remained there undergoing repairs until she was placed back in commission on 3 December 1862.

Then with her holds full of ammunition and other supplies, she once more sailed for the Gulf of Mexico and, by New Year's Day 1863, was back at Pensacola supporting Farragut's squadron.

=== Reassigned to support to Atlantic blockade ===
She remained on duty there until March 1863 when she sailed to New York City to load supplies for the North Atlantic Blockading Squadron and served the ships of that organization – primarily at Hampton Roads, Virginia – into August when she entered the Norfolk Navy Yard and was decommissioned there on the 30th for repairs to her leaking hull.

The bark was recommissioned on 1 October 1863, but transferred to the South Atlantic Blockading Squadron. She served at Port Royal, South Carolina – first as a supply vessel and then as a health ship – through the end of the Civil War.

== Post-war decommissioning ==
After the South collapsed, she sailed north late in May 1865 and was decommissioned for the last time at the Philadelphia Navy Yard on 9 June. She was sold at public auction there on 10 August. No facts concerning her subsequent career have been found.
