= USS Repose (AH-16) =

1944 Haven-class hospital ship

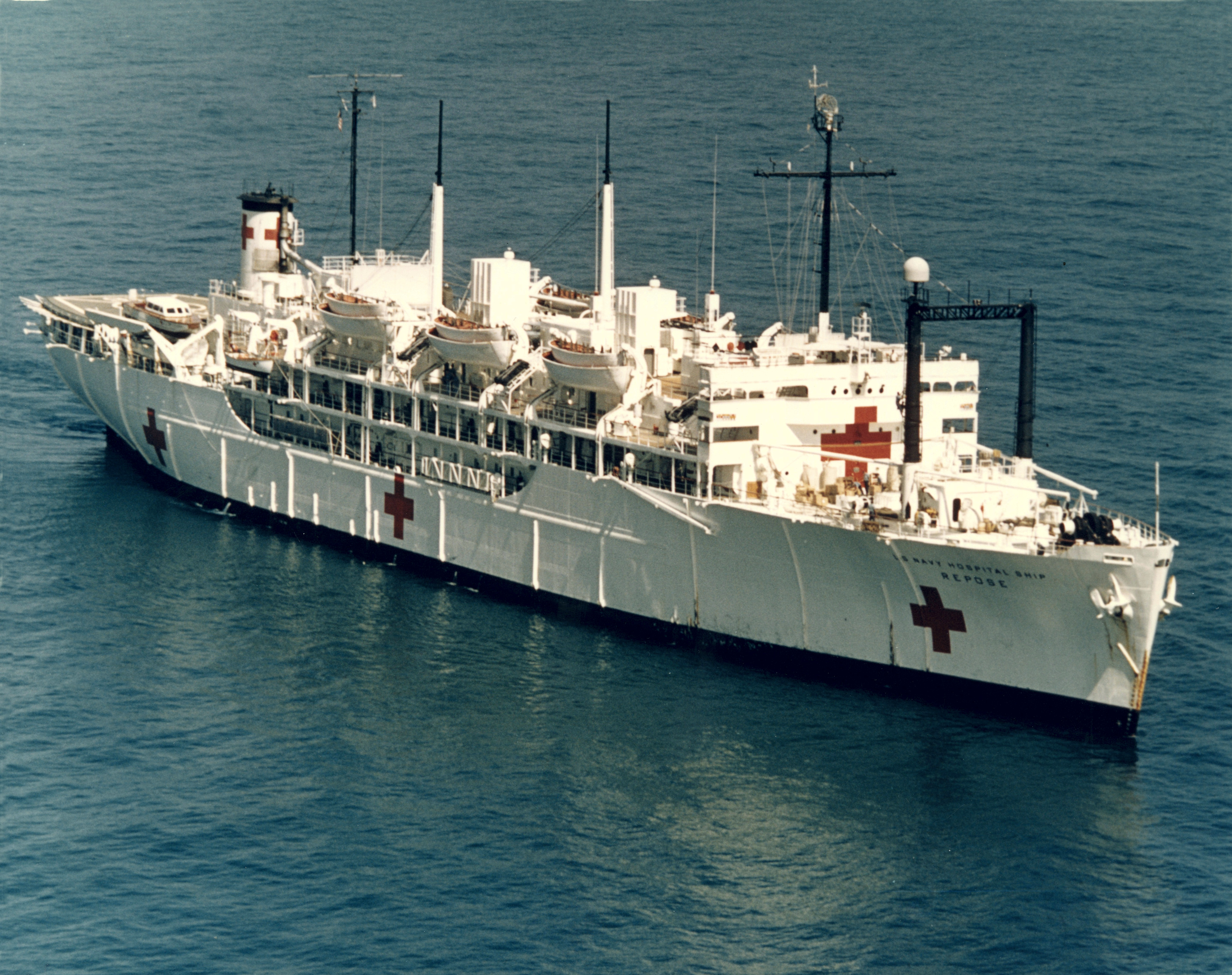
- USS Repose (AH-16) off Vietnam, 1966

History

United States
- Builder: Sun Shipbuilding & Drydock Co., Chester, Pennsylvania
- Laid down: 22 October 1943 as SS Marine Beaver
- Launched: 8 August 1944
- Acquired: 14 September 1944
- Commissioned: 26 May 1945
- Decommissioned: 19 January 1950
- Recommissioned: 28 October 1950
- Decommissioned: 21 December 1954
- Recommissioned: 16 October 1965
- Decommissioned: May 1970
- Stricken: 15 March 1974
- Fate: Sold for scrapping, 18 April 1975

General characteristics
- Displacement: 11,141 tons empty (15,100 max)
- Length: 520 ft (158.5 m); 665 ft (202.7 m) after 1968
- Beam: 71 ft 6 in (21.79 m)
- Draft: 24 ft (7.3 m)
- Propulsion: Geared turbine, single screw
- Speed: 17.5 knots
- Capacity: 800 patients
- Complement: 95 officers, 606 men
- Armament: None

The USS Repose (AH-16) was a Haven-class hospital ship in service with the United States Navy. It was active from May 1945 to January 1950, from October 1950 to December 1954, and from October 1965 to May 1970.

After five additional years in reserve, she was sold for scrap in 1975.

== History ==
The USS Repose (AH-16) was built as Marine Beaver, a type C4 class ship, in 1943 by Sun Shipbuilding & Drydock Co., Chester, Pennsylvania. She displaced 11,141 tons and had dimensions of 520 × 71.6 × 24 ft and a maximum speed of 18.7 knots. Launched on 8 August 1944, she was sponsored by Mrs. Pauline P. McIntire, and was acquired for conversion to a hospital ship by Bethlehem Shipbuilding Corporation, in Brooklyn, New York. Upon completion of her conversion to navy use, she was commissioned on 26 May 1945.

With a bed capacity of 750 and a complement of 564, the Repose departed Norfolk on 8 July 1945, for the Pacific. Serving as a casualty transport from various ports in the Pacific Ocean, the Repose also served as a base hospital ship in Shanghai and later Qingdao, China, supporting the occupation forces in northern China. The Repose remained in Asian waters, with an occasional return trip to the States until July 1949. She was decommissioned, in reserve, at San Francisco 19 January 1950.

The Repose was activated on 26 August 1950, and sailed for Pusan, Korea, picking up the navy crew in Yokosuka, Japan en route. Serving in Korean waters and evacuating patients to Japanese ports as necessary, the Repose remained on station until early 1954 with a short repair period in San Francisco from February to March 1953 and the installation of a helicopter landing pad. She remained at the Long Beach Naval Shipyard until her transfer to the Naval Reserve Fleet on 27 September 1954; she was decommissioned on 21 December 1954, at Hunters Point Naval Ship Yard.

After nearly eleven years in reserve at Suisun Bay, the Repose was recommissioned on 16 October 1965, for service in Vietnam. Arriving on 3 January 1966, she was permanently deployed to Southeast Asia and earned the nickname "Angel of the Orient." Operating mainly in the I Corps area, she served as the medical care site for more than 9,000 battle casualties and 24,000 inpatients while deployed.

Notably, the USS Repose was on station during the 1967 USS Forrestal fire that killed 134 sailors and injured 161. Her medical staff also treated marksman Staff Sergeant Carlos Hathcock in September 1969 after he and seven other U.S. Marines suffered extensive burns from an anti-tank mine blast. The Repose departed Vietnam on 14 March 1970, and was decommissioned in May 1970 and used as a hospital annex for the Long Beach Naval Hospital. When this proved uneconomical, she was sold for scrap in 1975.

== Awards ==
- Asiatic-Pacific Campaign Medal
- World War II Victory Medal
- China Service Medal
- National Defense Service Medal with star
- Korean Service Medal with nine battle stars
- Vietnam Service Medal with nine campaign stars
- United Nations Service Medal
- Republic of Vietnam Campaign Medal

== Gallery ==
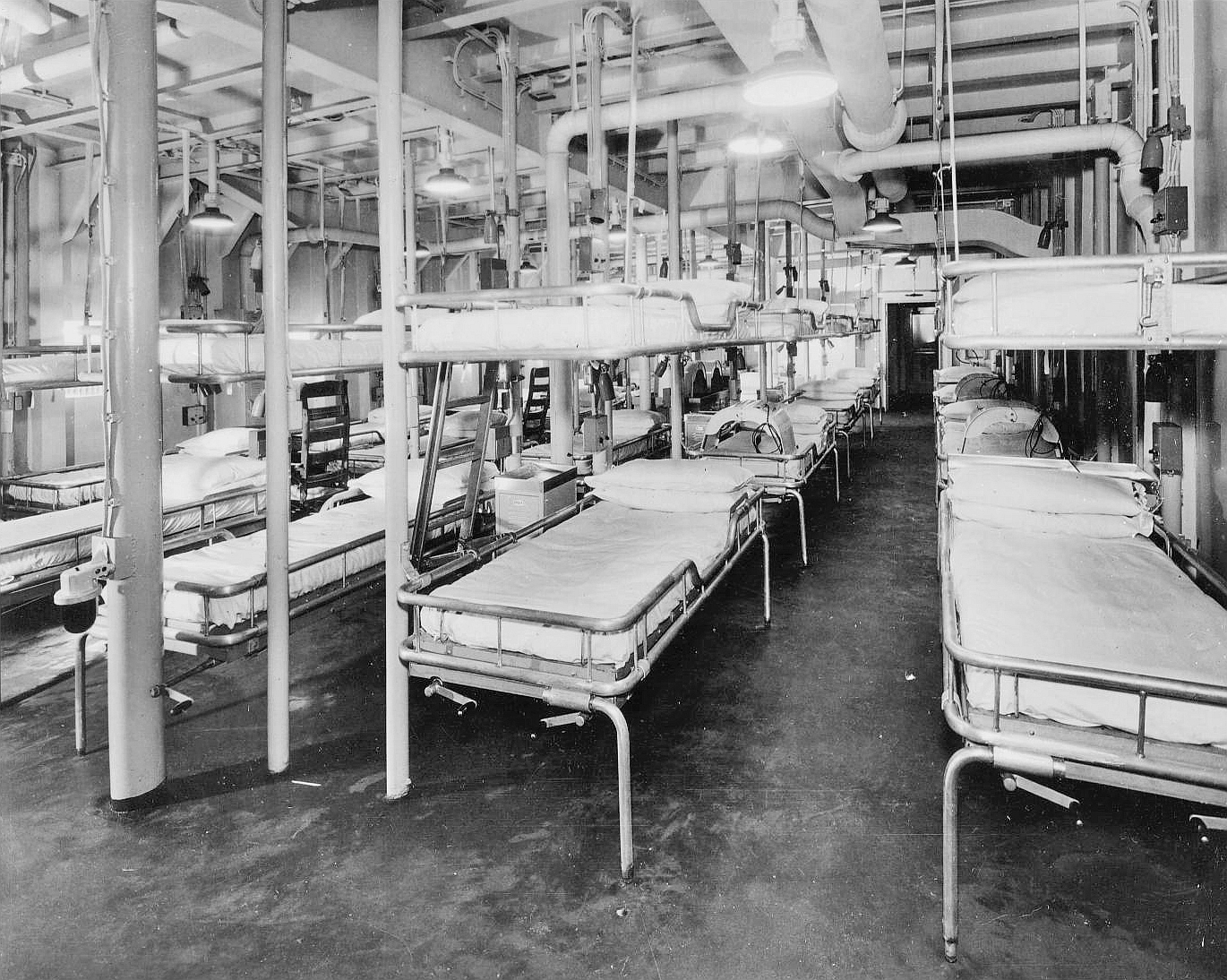
The 52-bed ward

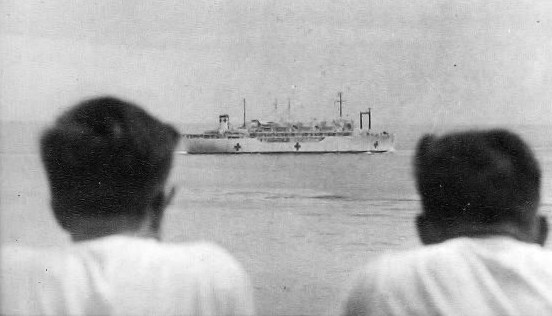
USS Repose on station during the 1967 USS Forrestal fire
