= USS Home =

Gunboat of the United States Navy

History

United States
- Name: USS Home
- Ordered: as Key West
- Launched: 1862
- Acquired: 14 August 1863
- Commissioned: 21 August 1863
- Decommissioned: 24 August 1865
- Fate: Sold, date unknown

General characteristics
- Type: Steamer
- Displacement: 725 long tons (737 t)
- Length: 165 ft (50 m)
- Beam: 29 ft 9 in (9.07 m)
- Depth of hold: 11 ft (3.4 m)
- Propulsion: Steam engine; screw-propelled
- Speed: 6 knots (6.9 mph; 11 km/h)
- Armament: 2 × 24 pdr (11 kg) howitzers, 1 × 12 pdr (5.4 kg) rifle

USS Home was a screw steamship purchased by the Union Navy during the American Civil War. She was placed into service as a hospital ship assigned to support the fleet blockading the ports of the Confederate States of America.

However, on occasion, she was ordered to serve as a blockader and was provided with the necessary deck guns for that purpose.

== Service history ==
Key West, a wooden-hulled screw steamer, was built in Brooklyn in 1862 by F. V. Tucker for the firm of Hiram Denner & Company, and completed in August. Instead of going into merchant service as intended, however, she was chartered on 8 August by the United States Army Quartermaster Corps for use as a transport in the ongoing civil war, at a rate of $600 per day, and would continue in this service until 21 April 1863. She was purchased by the Navy at New York on 14 August 1863, commissioned on 21 August 1863, Acting Master W. H. Garfield commanding, and name changed to Home. Assigned to the South Atlantic Blockading Squadron, Home sailed after commissioning for Charleston, South Carolina, towing monitor Lehigh. Home was assigned by Rear Admiral John A. Dahlgren as a rest ship, to which the exhausted crews of the steaming monitors could retire after the fierce bombardments of early September.

She remained off Charleston with periodic trips to Port Royal, South Carolina for repairs until July 1864, when she was assigned to act as a hospital ship inside the bar at Charleston. While serving as a combination blockader-hospital ship, her medical department was composed of Surgeons William Nicholas Pindell and Nelson Ingram, and the Surgeon Steward Frank Cook. She continued her combination blockader-hospital ship service until mid-1865, when she took up lightship duties in the harbor. During this period, Home also sent members of her crew ashore on boat expeditions in the Charleston area, notably on 5 March 1865, when an important reconnaissance of Charleston harbor obstructions was effected. Home returned to New York City in August 1865 and decommissioned on 24 August 1865. Redocumented Key West, she returned to merchant service; she was stranded and lost off Cape Hatteras on 12 October 1870.
