= USS Consolation =

United States Navy hospital ship

USS Consolation (AH-15)
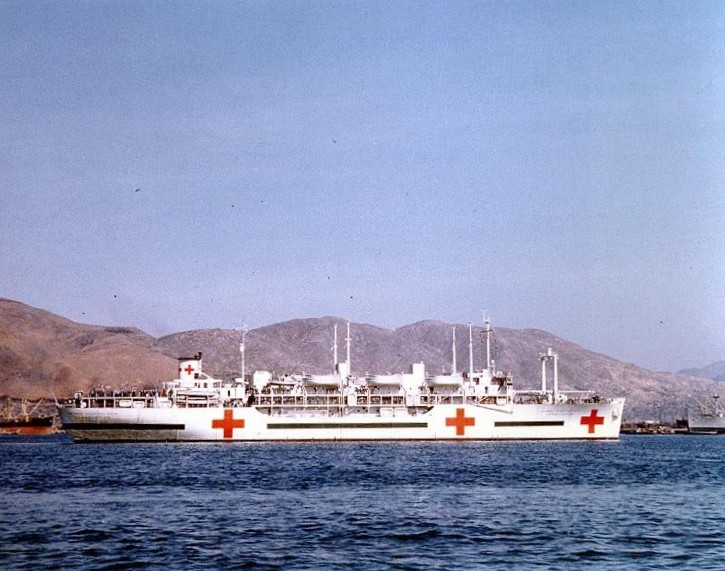
- USS Consolation (AH-15) off Korea in May 1952

History

United States
- Name: Marine Walrus (1944); Consolation (1944–1960); Hope (1960–1974)
- Builder: Sun Shipbuilding and Dry Dock Company at Chester, Pennsylvania
- Sponsored by: Mrs. H. C. Wilson
- Acquired: 30 August 1944
- Commissioned: 22 May 1945
- Decommissioned: 30 December 1955
- Honors and awards: 10 Battle stars for Korean War service
- Fate: Scrapped 1975

General characteristics
- Class & type: Haven-class hospital ship
- Displacement: 11,141 tons (light); 15,000 tons (full load)
- Length: 520 ft (160 m)
- Beam: 71 ft 6 in (21.79 m)
- Draft: 24 ft (7.3 m)
- Propulsion: Geared turbine engines, single screw
- Speed: 18 knots (33 km/h; 21 mph)
- Capacity: 802 beds
- Complement: 564

USS Consolation (AH-15) was a Haven-class hospital ship originally in service with the United States Navy from 1945 to 1955. In 1960 she was chartered to the People to People Health Foundation and renamed SS Hope and served for another 14 years until being scrapped in 1975.

Consolation was built as Marine Walrus in 1944 by Sun Shipbuilding and Dry Dock Co., Chester, Pennsylvania. Sponsored by Mrs. H. C. Wilson; acquired by the Navy 30 August 1944; converted at Bethlehem Steel Co., Hoboken, New Jersey; and commissioned 22 May 1945.

With a bed capacity of 802 and a complement of 564, Consolation joined the Pacific Fleet to provide hospital services, consultation, preventive medicine and casualty evacuation. Arriving on station in the Pacific after Victory over Japan Day, Consolation was assigned to establish a shore screening station and field hospital to screen Allied POWs at Wakayama, Honshū. She transferred 1,062 POWs to Okinawa and returned to serve as the base hospital for Honshū and then Nagoya, Japan during the Allied occupation of Japan. Consolation returned to San Francisco to undergo a brief overhaul from 23 November 1945 until 6 December 1945. From March until October 1946 she served as a transport from the canal zone to New York. From October 1946 she remained in commission, although inactive, until the outbreak of the Korean War.

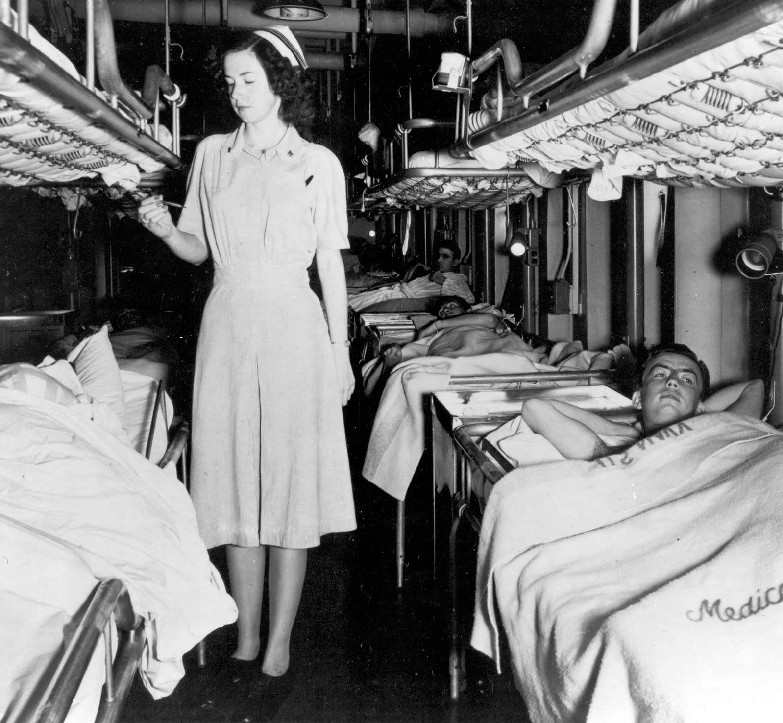
Navy nurse and patients in Ward C-3, 1950

Departing Norfolk 14 July 1950, Consolation arrived at Korea 16 August to care for the wounded until 6 April 1954. During this conflict she was the first hospital ship outfitted with a helicopter landing pad, 60 feet (18 m) in length, during 1951. In August she participated in Operation "Passage to Freedom" to return French troops from Vietnam to France, then returning to Korea until March 1955. She was decommissioned on 30 December 1955.

Consolation received 10 battle stars for Korean War service.

On 16 March 1960 Consolation was chartered to the People to People Health Foundation and renamed SS Hope, an acronym for Health Opportunity for People Everywhere. She sailed in September 1960 on her first cruise to Indonesia bringing modern medical treatment and training to that country. Later cruises to underdeveloped areas of the world included South Vietnam, Peru, Ecuador, Guinea, Nicaragua, Colombia, Sri Lanka, Tunisia, Jamaica, and Brazil.

Hope was retired in 1974 after eleven voyages.
