= USS Sanctuary =

1944 Haven-class hospital ship

Coordinates: 39°16′13″N 76°35′05″W

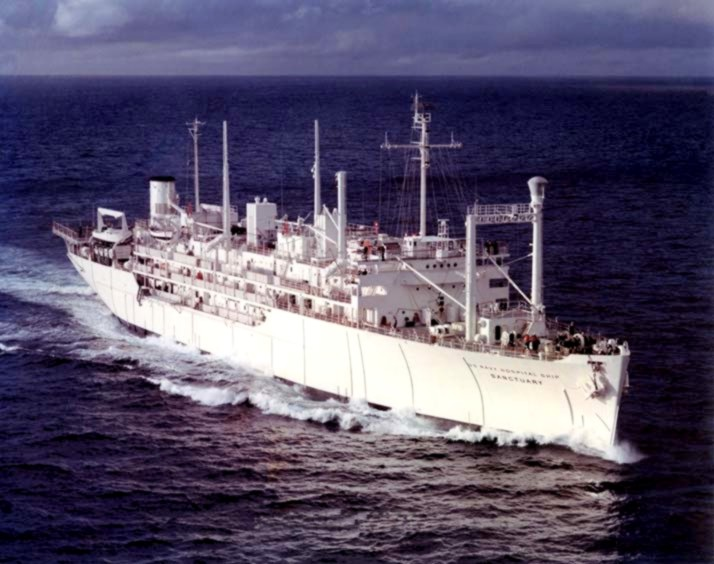
- USNS Sanctuary (T-AH-17) in 1973

History

United States
- Name: Sanctuary
- Laid down: 28 June 1944
- Launched: 15 August 1944
- Commissioned: 20 June 1945; 15 November 1966; 18 November 1972
- Decommissioned: 15 August 1946; 15 December 1971; March 1975
- Stricken: 1 September 1961; 16 February 1989
- Reinstated: 1 March 1966
- Fate: Sold for scrap, 2011

General characteristics
- Class & type: Haven-class hospital ship
- Displacement: 15,226 tons full load
- Length: 522 ft 10 in (159.36 m)
- Beam: 71 ft 8 in (21.84 m)
- Propulsion: Combination HP/LP 600 psi (4,100 kPa) steam turbine geared engine; Single screw, 9,000 shp (6,700 kW)
- Speed: 17.5 knots (32.4 km/h; 20.1 mph)
- Capacity: 800 patients
- Complement: 60 officers, 505 crew

USS Sanctuary (AH-17) was a Haven-class hospital ship that served in the U.S. Navy in World War II and the Vietnam War.

Sanctuary was laid down as SS Marine Owl by the Sun Shipbuilding and Dry Dock Co., Chester, Pennsylvania. The vessel was launched as Sanctuary (AH-17) on 15 August 1944, sponsored by Mrs. Alda Andrus; and delivered on 30 September 1944. Subsequently converted to a hospital ship by the Todd Shipbuilding Co., at Hoboken, New Jersey, whose citizens matched the cost of conversion with the purchase of war bonds, she was commissioned on 20 June 1945.

== Operation history ==
=== World War II ===
Following the shakedown, Sanctuary departed Norfolk on 31 July for the Pacific. She arrived at Pearl Harbor, Hawaii four days after the Japanese acceptance of surrender terms and, on 22 August, continued on to the Far East to assist in the repatriation of former prisoner of wars (POWs).

Proceeding via Okinawa, Sanctuary arrived off Wakayama in Task Group 56.5 on 11 September; then waited as minecraft cleared the channels. On the afternoon of the 13th, she commenced taking on sick, injured, and ambulatory cases. By 03:00 on the 14th, she had exceeded her rated bed capacity of 786. A call was put out to the fleet requesting cots. The request was answered; and, seven hours later, she sailed for Okinawa with 1,139 liberated POWs, primarily British, Australian, and Javanese, embarked for the first leg of their journey home. Despite a typhoon encountered en route, Sanctuary delivered her charges safely to Army personnel at Naha; and, by the 21st, was underway for Nagasaki. Arriving on the 22d, she embarked more ex-POWs; then loaded military personnel rotating back to the United States and steamed for Naha. On the 25th, she discharged her liberated prisoners; then shifted to Buckner Bay. A typhoon warning next sent her to sea; but she returned three days later; took on 439 civilian repatriates, including some 40 children under the age of ten, and military repatriates and passengers; and set a course for Guam. There, she exchanged passengers for patients; then continued on to San Francisco, arriving on 22 October.

Between 18 November and 17 December, Sanctuary completed a run to Saipan and Guam, and back to San Francisco. During late December 1945 and January 1946, she made two round trips between California and Hawaii. On 7 February, she departed San Francisco for Philadelphia and deactivation. She arrived at League Island on 1 March and was decommissioned on 15 August. For the next 15 years, she was berthed with the Atlantic Reserve Fleet: on 1 September 1961 her name was stricken from the Navy list, and she was transferred to the Maritime Administration for berthing with the National Defense Reserve Fleet.

=== Vietnam War ===
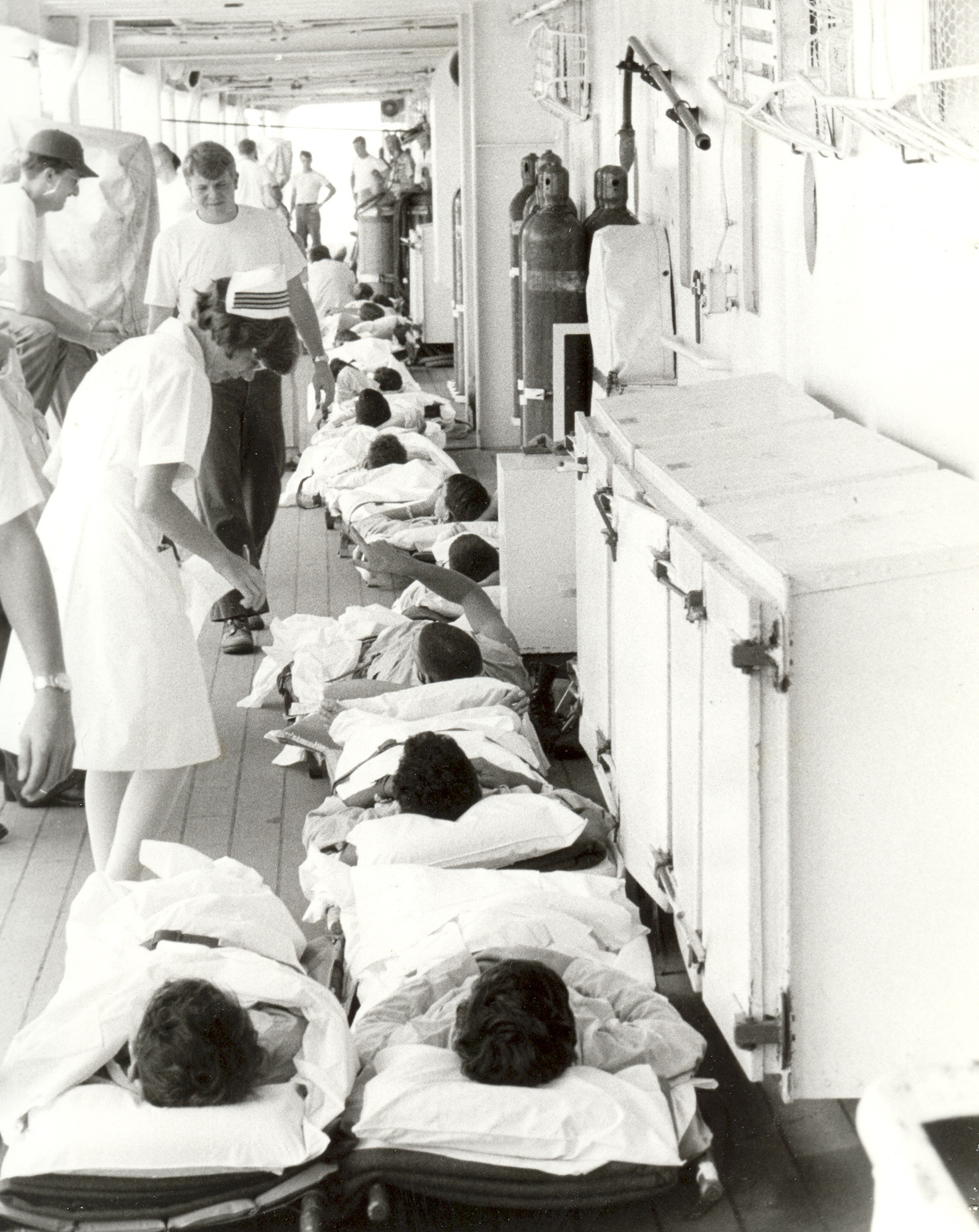
Navy nurse and patients aboard USS Sanctuary in the 1960s

On 1 March 1966, Sanctuary was reacquired by the Navy and reinstated on the Navy list. Towed to Louisiana, she was modernized at the Avondale Shipyards, Westwego; and was re-commissioned at New Orleans on 15 November 1966, Captain John F. Collingwood, USN, commanding and Captain Gerald J. Duffner, MC, USN, commanding Naval Hospital in USS Sanctuary. Modernization had given her a heliport, three x-ray units, a blood bank, an artificial kidney machine, ultrasonic diagnostic equipment, a recompression chamber and other modern equipment, medical, culinary, laundry, etc., to supplement her 20 wards and four operating rooms. Three hundred and sixteen medical personnel were assigned to staff the Naval Hospital. Her mission had shifted in emphasis: from that of an "ambulance" ship carrying wounded and sick to hospitals in rear areas, to that of a fully equipped hospital carrying medical facilities close to the combat area.

On 8 March 1967, Sanctuary departed San Francisco for the Far East. On 2 April, she joined the 7th Fleet at Subic Bay. On the 10th, she arrived at Da Nang, South Vietnam. "SANCTUARY received WIA casualties directly from the field, sick and wounded who had received prior treatment at shore medical facilities, and sick and wounded that required special treatment not available ashore." That afternoon she took on her first casualties – ten marines badly burned when their amphibious tank detonated a land mine, which, in turn, had exploded the gasoline tank. By midnight, 136 patients had been received. By the end of April, she had admitted 717 patients – 319 combat casualties, 72 non-combat injuries, 326 suffering from various diseases – and treated 682 outpatients. Only two of her patients died.

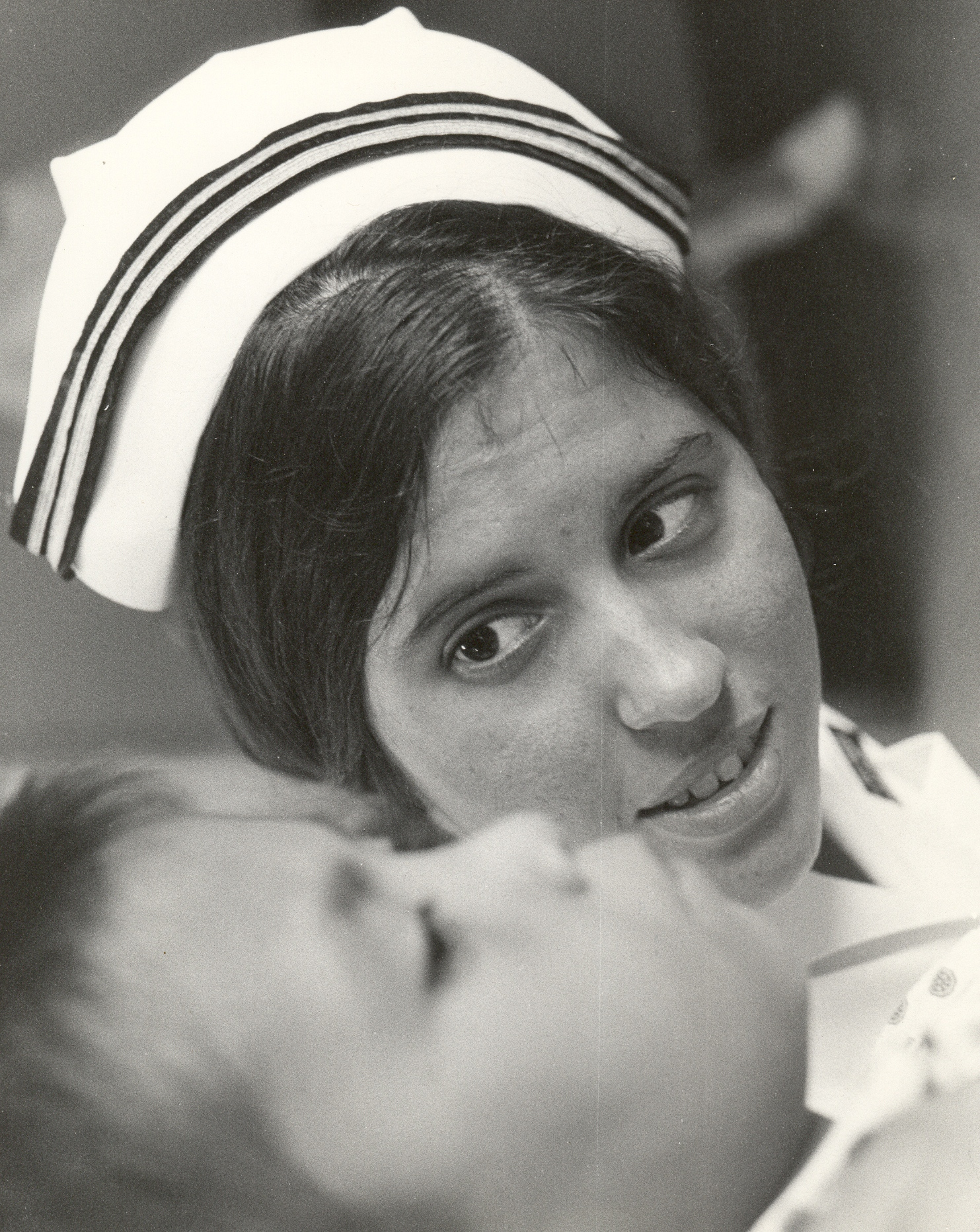
Navy nurse aboard USS Sanctuary in the 1960s

Assigned to duty off South Vietnam on a non-rotating basis, Sanctuary began her extended overseas tour spending a minimum of 50 days operating on the line each quarter, followed by an availability and upkeep period at Subic Bay. By April 1968, after a year on that schedule, she had admitted 5,354 patients and treated another 9,187 on an outpatient basis. Helicopters, bringing patients from the battlefield, transferring them from and to other medical facilities, or carrying passengers to and from the ship, had made more than 2,500 landings on her deck.

The following month, Sanctuary's schedule was changed to 90-day on-the-line periods. Her operating area and her itinerary on the line, however, remained the same. She continued to operate off the I Corps Tactical area, the northern provinces of South Vietnam; and, for the most part, rotated between stations, such as Da Nang, Phu Bai, Chu Lai, and Dong Ha, every two to four days as needed by the Marines fighting ashore.

Occasionally granted brief rest and recreation out of the area (five days in Subic Bay plus travel time there and back), Sanctuary – the only Navy hospital off Vietnam after 16 March 1970 – maintained her busy schedule to that date and increased it thereafter through 1970 and into 1971 during which time she was scheduled for 120-day on-the-line schedules. On 23 April 1971, she departed Da Nang for the last time. During May, she visited Hong Kong and called at Sasebo; then sailed for Pearl Harbor and San Francisco, where she arrived on 10 June.

In commission, in reserve, as of 31 August 1971, Sanctuary was decommissioned on 15 December. The next 11 months were spent at Hunters Point Naval Shipyard where she was converted for use as a dependents' hospital and as a commissary/Navy exchange retail store. This was in connection with plans to base a U.S. aircraft carrier at Piraeus, Greece (which did not, in fact, eventuate). Another change brought the assignment of two women officers and 60 enlisted women to the ship for other than medical duties, and, on recommissioning on 18 November 1972, she became the first United States Navy ship with a mixed male–female ship's company.

Sanctuary remained in Hunter's Point Naval Shipyard until late January 1973, when she put to sea for two weeks of refresher training. She returned to Hunter's Point on 22 February and remained berthed until 16 August, when she got underway for two days cruising. Returning to San Francisco on the 17th, Sanctuary began a period of restricted availability during which her propulsion system was converted to Navy Distillate Fuel.

After several weeks preparation, she got underway, in mid-September 1973, for a three-month goodwill cruise to South America. She went through the Panama Canal where there was a brief liberty call. On this mission, sponsored by the State Department, Sanctuary assisted the peoples of Colombia and Haiti in three distinct areas: medical aid, material aid (by delivering over $500,000 worth of non-monetary donations), and civic action projects (civil engineering projects). She visited Buena Ventura, Colombia, from 12 October to 6 November and stopped at Port-au-Prince, Haiti, from 13 November until early December. She arrived at Mayport, Florida, her new home port, on 14 December 1973 and remained there for the duration of the year. The USS Sanctuary was a success at having the mixed ship's company. They showed that both male and female sailors could do the job.

Sanctuary earned eleven battle stars for service in the Vietnam War.

=== Civilian service ===
In 1989, the Navy sold ex-Sanctuary for $10 to a group called Life International. Four years later, Life International transferred the vessel to Project Life, Inc., which planned to convert the ship into a training center for recovering drug addicts. Unable to reach an agreement with the Maryland Port Authority (MPA) for use of a pier, in 1998, Project Life sued the MPA, accusing it of violating the Americans with Disabilities Act. The MPA lost the suit and in 2001, Project Life was awarded a five-year lease at Baltimore's North Locust Point Marine Terminal. In February 2007, eight months after Project Life's lease ended, the dilapidated ship broke its moorings and was adrift in Baltimore Harbor. The MPA sued Project Life for over $100,000 in back rents and fees incurred to secure the vessel.

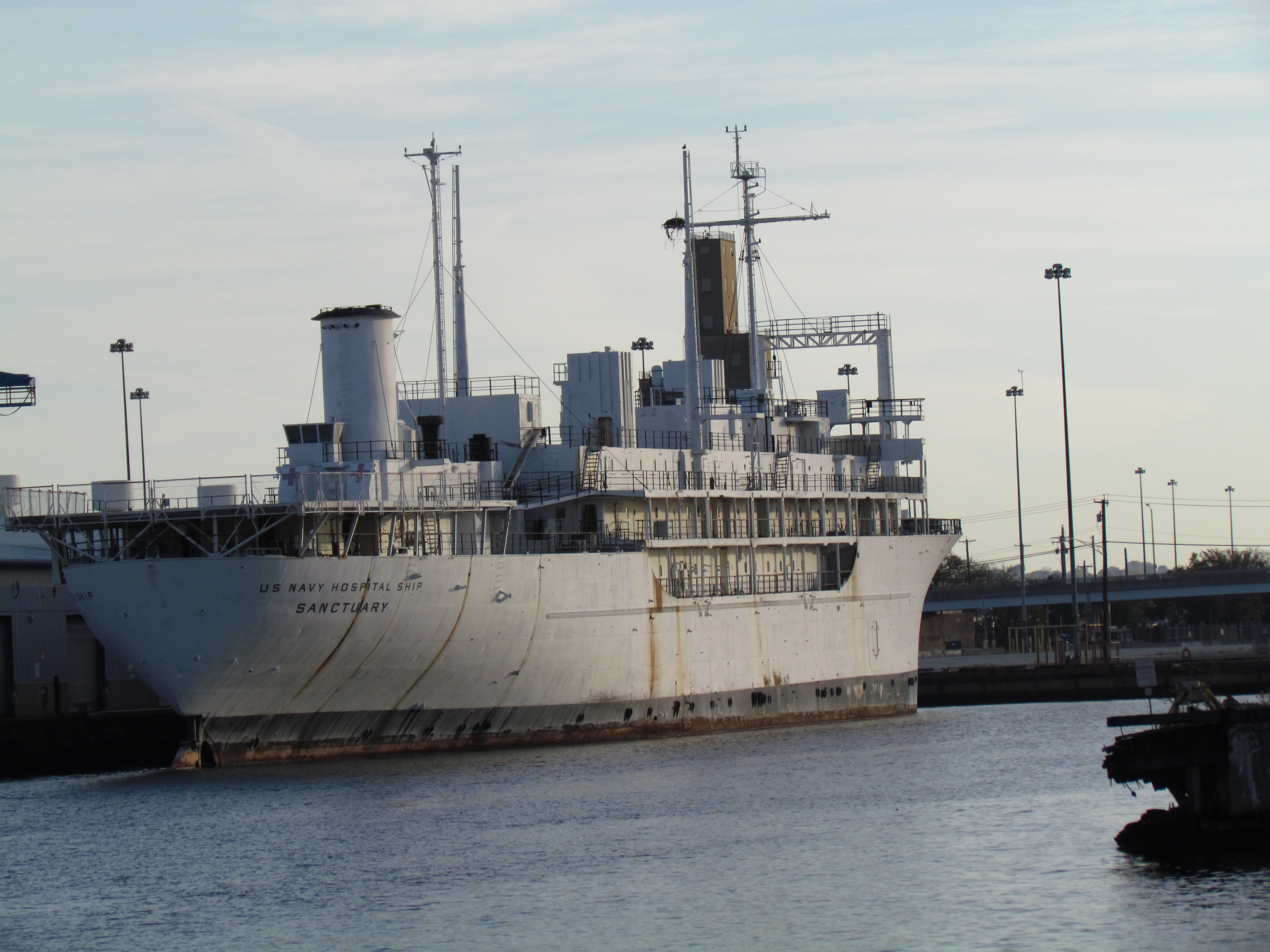
USS Sanctuary laid up in Baltimore Harbor, October 2010

==== PCB concerns and fate ====
Ex-Sanctuary was sold at public auction in Baltimore for $50,000 to Potomac Navigation, Inc. on 21 August 2007. Potomac intended to tow the ship to Greece for evaluation as a hotel or storage facility, however in November 2007 ex-Sanctuary's departure was blocked by the Environmental Protection Agency (EPA) pending testing for PCBs. International Shipbreaking of Texas had considered bidding on the ship during the August auction for scrapping, but declined after its testing indicated high levels of PCBs. The original bill of sale indicated the ship also contained asbestos in the early 1990s. Potomac Navigation's testing showed much lower PCB levels. The Baltimore Sun reported that the ship could be taken overseas and sold for scrap regardless of PCB content and yielding a profit of $3 million while endangering the environment. Ex-Sanctuary was towed out of Baltimore on 17 August 2011. The eventual owner, Potomac Navigation sold her to be scrapped by ESCO Marine in Brownsville, Texas.

== Ship's motto ==
- "Service-Mobility-Support" (World War II era)
- Official: "Copiae Servamus": We serve the troops. (Vietnam era)
- Unofficial: "You Find 'Em, We Bind 'Em. Open 24 Hours." The initial sign was a banner secured to the rail between the helo deck and the stack 01 level; second version was painted sign on the bulkhead just forward of the helo deck.

== Notable crew ==
- George H. Goodrich, justice of the Superior Court of the District of Columbia, served on the Sanctuary during World War II.
- Future NBC news correspondent Robert Goralski served as a Quartermaster on the Sanctuary during World War II.
- James A. Knight, served on the Sanctuary during World War II as a chaplain, subsequently became a psychiatrist, theologian, and medical ethicist.
