= USS Tranquillity =

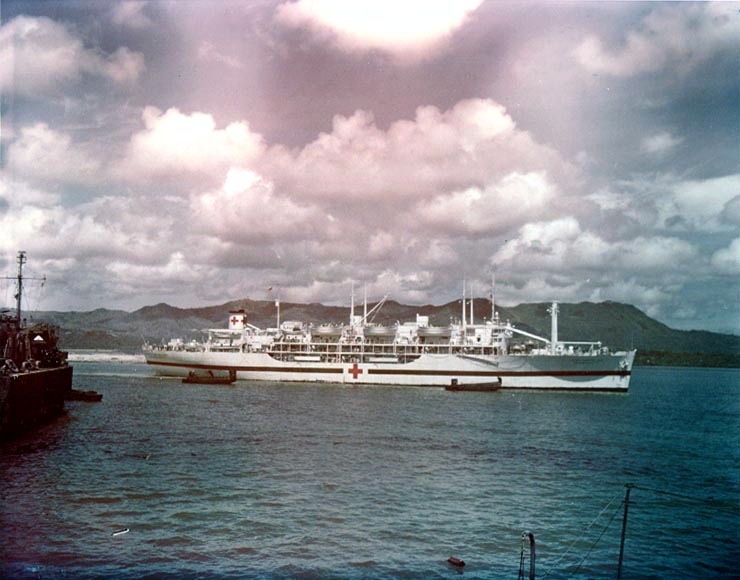

History

United States
- Builder: Sun Shipbuilding & Drydock Co.; Chester, Pennsylvania
- Laid down: 20 August 1943 as SS Marine Dolphin (MC Hull #745)
- Launched: 25 July 1944
- Commissioned: 24 April 1945
- Decommissioned: 26 July 1946
- Reclassified: APH-114; AH-14, 22 March 1946
- Stricken: 1 September 1961
- Fate: Sold for scrap 15 July 1974

General characteristics
- Class & type: Haven-class hospital ship
- Displacement: 15,400 tons
- Length: 520.0 ft (158.5 m); 665.0 ft (202.7 m) after 1968
- Beam: 71 ft 6 in (21.79 m)
- Draft: 24 ft (7.3 m)
- Propulsion: geared turbine, single screw
- Speed: 17.5 knots
- Capacity: 802 patients
- Complement: 568

USS Tranquillity (AH-14) was a Haven-class hospital ship in the service of the United States Navy during World War II.

Built as Marine Dolphin in 1943 by Sun Shipbuilding & Drydock Co. under Maritime Commission contract, she was renamed Tranquillity on 22 June 1944; launched on 25 July 1944; sponsored by Miss Carol P. Meekins; acquired by the Navy from the Maritime Commission on 14 August 1944; converted into a hospital ship at New York City by the Atlantic Basin Iron Works; and commissioned on 24 April 1945.

Welcome To the U.S.N. Hospital Ship Tranquillity booklet, 1945

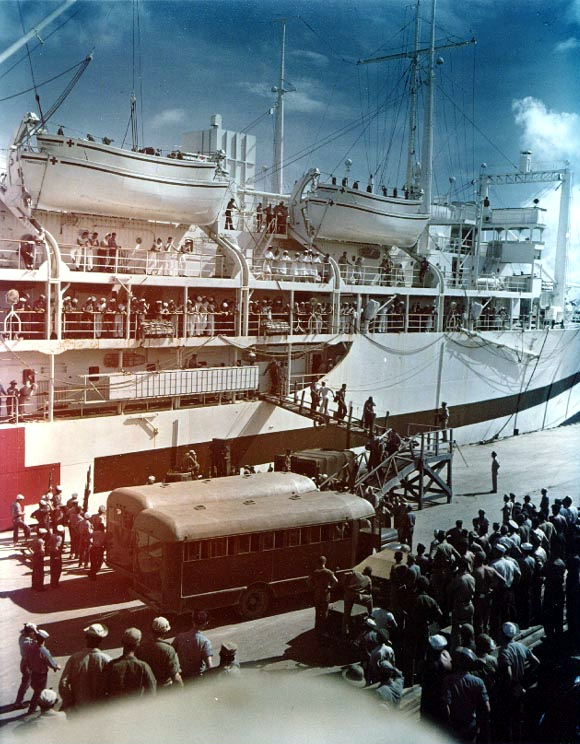
Survivors of USS Indianapolis (CA-35) arrive at Guam on 8 August 1945

With a bed capacity of 802 and a complement of 568, Tranquillity was one of the first six fully air conditioned ships in the Navy. She was equipped with 85,000 cubic feet (2,400 m^{3}) of medical storage space, and a 100-bed field hospital.

Tranquillity got underway from Hampton Roads on 5 May 1945 for shakedown trials and assignment to the Pacific Fleet to provide hospital services, consultation, preventive medicine and casualty evacuation. Tranquility began service as a base hospital at Ulithi and was dispatched on 3 August 1945 to the Palau Islands to receive the survivors from the USS Indianapolis (CA-35) and transport them to Guam. Tranquillity was then assigned to assist the 3rd Fleet by returning 766 patients from Guam to the US. On 26 September 1945 she was assigned to Operation Magic Carpet to return troops from overseas to the US and was designated APH-114.

On 25 March 1946 Tranquillity was designated AH-14 and was decommissioned, in reserve, on 16 July 1956. She was struck from the Naval Register on 1 September 1961.

On 15 July 1974, Tranquillity was sold for scrapping to Northern Metal Co., Division of North James River Associates for $58,300.00 (PD-X-395 dated 5 June 1947) Withdrawn from the Suisun Bay Reserve Fleet and delivered to Northern Metals, 5 August 1974

Tranquillity received one battle star for World War II service.
