= Georgetown University School of Medicine =

Medical school in Washington, D.C., US

Coordinates: 38.9118°N 77.0751°W

- Seal of Georgetown University
- Type: Private
- Established: 1851; 175 years ago
- Parent institution: Georgetown University
- Affiliations: Roman Catholic (Jesuit)
- Dean: Norman J. Beauchamp, MD, MHS
- Faculty: 1,638
- Students: 830
- Location: Washington, D.C., USA
- Campus: Urban
- Website: som.georgetown.edu

Georgetown University School of Medicine is a private medical school in Washington, D.C. Founded in 1851, it is one of Georgetown University's five graduate schools. It is located on Reservoir Road in the Georgetown neighborhood adjacent to the university's main campus. The School of Medicine works in association with the 609-bed MedStar Georgetown University Hospital, MedStar Washington Hospital Center, and nine other affiliated federal and community hospitals in the Washington metropolitan area. Georgetown is the oldest Catholic medical school in the United States.

The School is part of the Georgetown University Medical Center, which comprises roughly 80% of the research initiatives occurring at Georgetown University as a whole. It is the closest academic medical center in proximity to the National Institutes of Health. Georgetown and the NIH offer a combined GU-NIH PhD program in biomedical research to foster direct collaboration between the neighboring institutions.

Technology leading to the introduction of the HPV vaccine, was developed at Georgetown Medical Center by Richard Schlegel.

== History ==
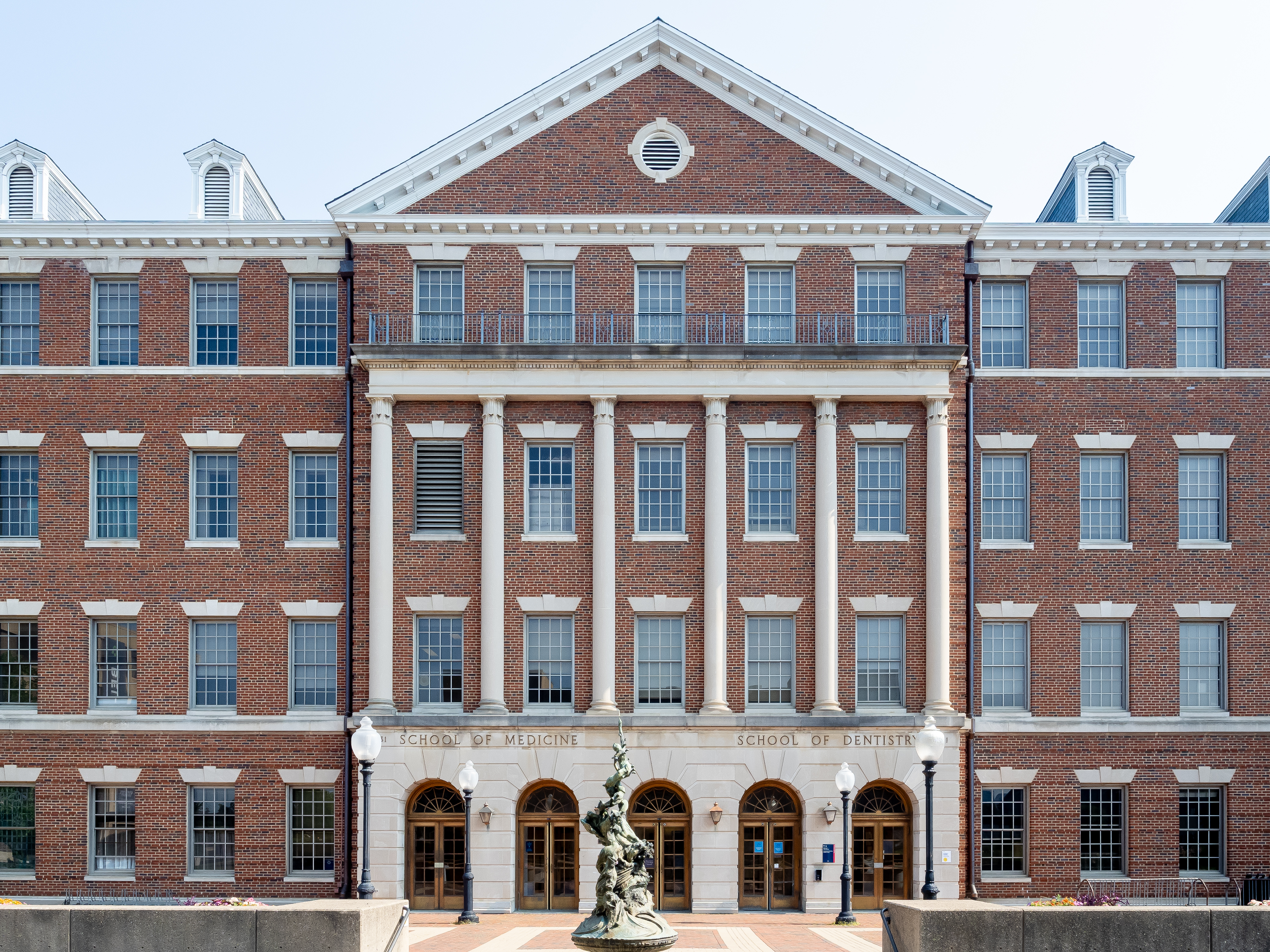
Medical & Dental School Building (south side)

In 1849, four Catholic doctors frustrated with what they felt were discriminatory practices at neighboring Columbian College, limiting Catholic doctors' access to the clinical facilities of the Washington Infirmary, petitioned Georgetown President James A. Ryder to found a medical program. Classes commenced in May 1851 and were only held at night until 1895. In 1852, the school awarded its first medical doctorates.

In 1898 the Georgetown University Hospital was established. A dental department was created in 1901, which became independent of the School of Medicine in 1951 as the School of Dentistry. In 1930, classes moved to the main campus. In July 2000, Georgetown University and MedStar Health, a not-for-profit organization of seven Baltimore and Washington hospitals, entered into a clinical partnership to provide management of clinical care and clinical education at Georgetown University Hospital. In 2004, the School of Medicine opened the Integrated Learning Center (ILC), which supports the School of Medicine's emphasis on a patient-centered, competence-based curriculum and provides the latest methods of clinical teaching and evaluation.

== Curriculum ==
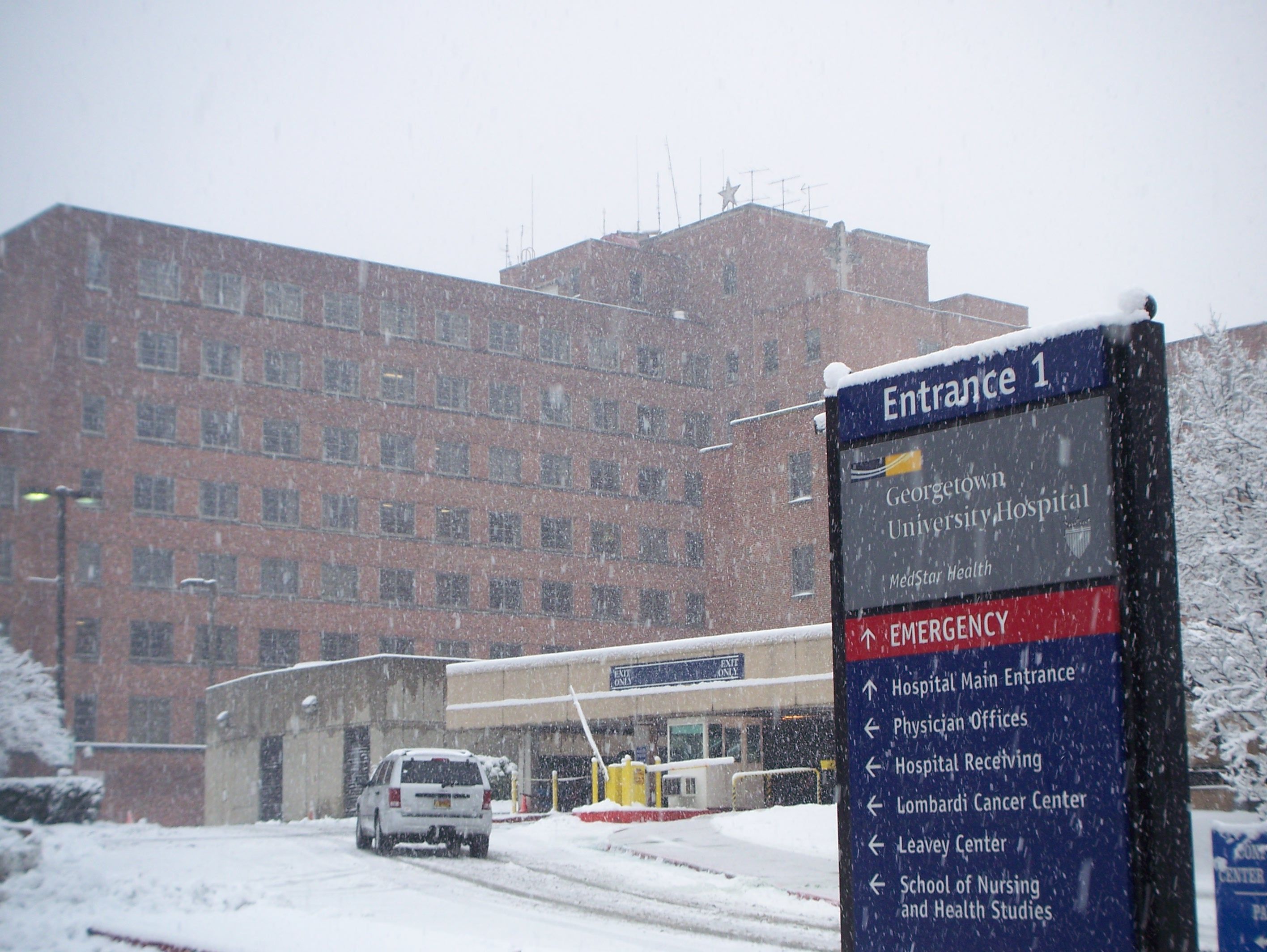
Georgetown University Hospital

The Georgetown University School of Medicine Faculty includes 1,638 faculty members from 8 basic science and 16 clinical departments, an NCI-designated Comprehensive Cancer Center, and two Interdisciplinary Training Program Grants funded by the NIH – one in Neuroscience, and one in Tumor Biology.

The School of Medicine offers an MD with a Research Track where MD students spend time in the laboratory and develop a research thesis in their specialty. This is different from the MD/PhD program, which is longer and requires a PhD thesis.

The School of Medicine and the Graduate School of Arts & Sciences cooperate to offer a combined-degree program that leads to an MD and a PhD in a chosen concentration. A spot is reserved in this program each year for one student interested in pursuing a Philosophy & Bioethics PhD; all other spots are undifferentiated but must be directed toward a scientific specialty. Research at Georgetown is especially strong in the areas of cancer and the neurosciences. Other combined degree programs include BA/MD (early selection route for Georgetown University undergraduates), MD/MBA, and MD/MS.

=== Programs ===
- Anesthesia
- Biochemistry & Molecular Biology
- Biomathematics & Statistics
- Cell Biology
- Dermatology
- Emergency Medicine
- Family Medicine
- Graduate Biomedical Education
- Medicine
- Microbiology & Immunology
- Neurology
- Neurosurgery
- Obstetrics & Gynecology
- Oncology
- Ophthalmology
- Orthopaedic Surgery
- Otolaryngology
- Pathology
- Pediatrics
- Pharmacology
- Physiology & Biophysics
- Psychiatry
- Radiation Medicine
- Radiology
- Surgery
- Urology

== Campus ==
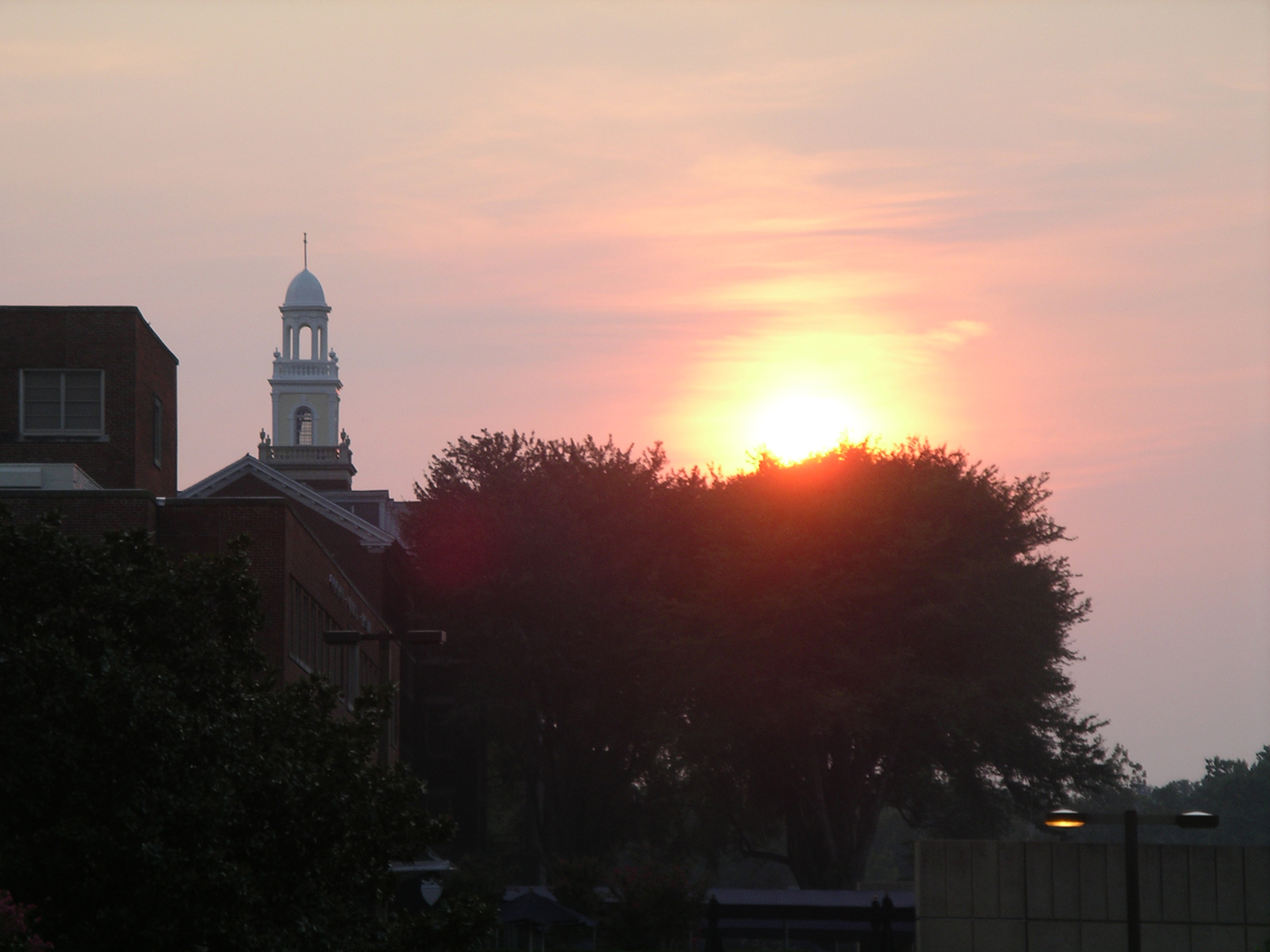
Sunset over the Medical & Dental School Building

Georgetown University Medical Center comprises the School of Medicine, School of Nursing & Health Studies (founded in 1903), Georgetown Lombardi Comprehensive Cancer Center and Biomedical Graduate Education. In 2008, GUMC brought in $132 million in sponsored research funds, most of which was federally funded. Clinical care is provided at MedStar Georgetown University Hospital and other locations through a partnership with MedStar Health.

== List of deans ==
Deans
No.	Name	Years	Ref.
1	Johnson Elliot	1851–1876	
2	Robert Reyburn	1876–1877	
3	Francis Asbury Ashford	1877–1883	
4	James William Lovejoy	1883–1888	
5	C. Lloyd Magruder	1888–1901	
6	George M. Kober	1901–1928	
7	John A. Foote	1929–1931	
8	William Gerry Morgan	1931–1935	
9	David V. McCauley SJ	1935–1946	
10	Paul A. McNally SJ	1946–1953	
11	Francis M. Forster	1953–1958	
12	Hugh H. Hussey	1958–1963	
13	John C. Rose	1963–1974	
14	John P. Utz	1974–1979	
15	John Bernard Henry	1979–1984	
16	Milton Corn	1984–1989	
17	William Maxted	1989–1998	
18	Carolyn Rabinowitz	1998–2002	
19	Stephen Ray Mitchell	2002–2020	
20	Leon Jones	2021-2024	
21	Norman J. Beauchamp Jr.	2024–present	

== Notable alumni ==
Name	Degree and year received	Accomplishments
John Barrasso	C 1974, M 1978	United States Senator from Wyoming, 2007–present
Mark R. Dybul	C 1985, M 1992	United States Global AIDS Coordinator, U.S. Department of State, 2006–2008
David John Doukas	M 1983	Tulane University; Director of the Program in Medical Ethics and Human Values, James A. Knight Chair in Medical Humanities and Ethics
Marguerite M. Engler	Ph.D. – 1988	Nurse scientist and physiologist, acting scientific director of the National Institute of Nursing Research's division of intramural research, 2012
Marie R. Griffin	M 1976	Vaccine researcher; Professor of Medicine and Endowed Director of Public Health Research and Education at Vanderbilt University Medical Center
David A. Hidalgo	C 1974, M 1978	Reconstructive and aesthetic plastic surgeon, author, and visual artist; Clinical Professor of Surgery at Weill Cornell Medical College
Susan Hockfield	Med Ph.D. – 1979	Neuroscientist; President, MIT, 2004–2012; Provost, Yale University, 2003–04; Dean, Yale Graduate School of Arts and Sciences, 1998–2000;
Thea L. James	M 1991	Associate Professor, Associate Chief Medical Officer, and Vice President of the Mission at the Boston Medical Center
Kevin C. Kiley	M 1976	Lt. Gen. Kiley is the 41st Surgeon General of the Army and Commander, U.S. Army Medical Command, 2004–2007
Antonia Novello	Hospital Fellow 1975	Surgeon General of the United States, 1990–93
Esam Omeish	C 1989, M 1993	former President of the Muslim American Society
Thomas Parran Jr.	M 1915	Surgeon General of the United States, 1936–48
Sean P. Pinney	C 1990, M 1994	Cardiologist
Robert R. Redfield	C 1973, M 1977	Director of the Centers for Disease Control and Prevention, 2018–2021
John J. Ring	C 1949, M 1953	former President, American Medical Association
Jordan Shlain	M 1994	Primary care physician; chairman and founder of Private Medical, a family office for health and medicine; founder of HealthLoop, a cloud-based clinical engagement platform
Lana Skirboll	Ph.D – 1977	former Director, National Institutes of Health Office of Science Policy
William Kennedy Smith	M 1991	Founder, Center for International Rehabilitation and Physicians Against Land Mines; member of the Kennedy family
Solomon Snyder	C 1959, M 1962	Neuroscientist
Robert Stein	M 1866	German-American translator, interpreter of Eskimo–Aleut languages, and amateur Arctic explorer
Andrew von Eschenbach	M 1967	Director, Food and Drug Administration, 2006–2009; Director, National Cancer Institute, 2002–05; Director, BioTime, a biotechnology company, 2011–present
William B. Walsh	M 1943	Founder of Project HOPE; humanitarian aid activist; first U.S. physician on the ground in Hiroshima after the atomic bomb was dropped; recipient of the Presidential Medal of Freedom
