= Ali Rıza Öreroğlu =

Turkish/Persian Plastic Surgeon

- Born: Tehran, Iran
- Education: Ankara University Medical School
- Medical career
- Profession: Doctor of Medicine
- Field: Plastic Reconstructive and Aesthetic Surgeon
- Website: www.oreroglu.com

Ali Rıza Öreroğlu, MD (Turkish: [ali ɾɯza œɾæɾojɫu]), is a Turkish plastic, reconstructive and aesthetic surgeon. His work includes facial rejuvenation and rhinoplasty.

== Early life and education ==
Born to a Turkish father and a Persian mother, Öreroğlu completed his primary education in Tehran. He graduated from the Ankara University Faculty of Medicine in 2006. He completed his specialist training in plastic, reconstructive and aesthetic surgery at Istanbul Okmeydanı Training and Research Hospital in 2012.

== Career ==
In 2009, Öreroğlu was an observer fellow with Foad Nahai at the PACES plastic surgery clinic in Atlanta, Georgia. He later received an International Aesthetic Surgery Fellowship from the American Society of Aesthetic Plastic Surgery (ASAPS).

Öreroğlu worked at Dr. İlhan Özdemir State Hospital in Giresun and at Acıbadem Fulya Hospital. In November 2016, he opened a private clinic in Nişantaşı, Istanbul.

=== Research work ===
Öreroğlu has published research on plastic surgery, including work on rhinoplasty techniques. He is known as a fellow and board certified member of the Turkish Society of Plastic Reconstructive and Aesthetic Surgery; the Turkish Aesthetic Plastic Surgery Society; the European Board of Plastic, Reconstructive and Aesthetic Surgery; the International Society of Plastic Surgery and the American Society of Plastic Surgeons.

== Awards ==
Second prize in the clinic category of the Proclamation Competition at the 33rd National Congress of the Society of Turkish Plastic Reconstructive and Aesthetic Surgery in 2011.

Observer fellowship grant to the International Aesthetic Surgery Fellowship program of the American Society of Aesthetic Plastic Surgery (ASAPS) 2013.

== Selected publications ==
- Concentric-needle cannula method for single-puncture arthrocentesis in temporomandibular joint disease: an inexpensive and feasible technique. Öreroğlu AR, Özkaya Ö, Öztürk MB, Bingöl D, Akan M. J Oral Maxillofac Surg. 2011 Sep;69(9):2334-8.
- Isolated congenital partial absence of the left lower lateral nasal cartilage: case report. Asfuroğlu Barutca S, Öreroğlu AR, Usçetin I, Kutlu N. Ann Plast Surg. 2011 Dec;67(6):662-4.
- A Suggestion for the Preoperative Checklist of Plastic Surgery Operations. Öreroğlu AR, Üsçetin İ, Aksan T, Orman Ç, Akan M. Turk Plast Surg. 2011 Sep/Dec;19(3):151-2.
- Contemporary Perforator Flap Variations Their Applications. Öreroğlu AR, Üsçetin İ, Barutca S, Orman Ç, Karahangil M, Akan M. Okmeydani Tip Derg. 2012 Jan;28(1):1-7.
- Coexistent Cutaneous Tuberous and Tendinous Xanthomas in Traumatic Regions: A Case Report. Öreroğlu AR, Üsçetin İ, Egemen O, Öztürk MB, Asfuroğlu S, Tatlıdede HS. Eur J Plast Surg. 2012 Apr;35(4):325-327.
- Rhinoplasty: A Complete Subperichondrial Dissection with Management of the Nasal Ligaments. Çakır B, Öreroğlu AR, Doğan T, Akan M. Aesthet Surg J. 2012 Jul;32(5):564-74.
- Ocular Complication After Trichloroacetic Acid Peeling: A Case Report. Öztürk MB, Özkaya Ö, Karahangil M, Çekic O, Öreroğlu AR, Akan M. Aesth Plast Surg. 2013 Feb;37(1):56–59.
- Rhinoplasty: Surface Aesthetics and Surgical Techniques. Çakır B, Doğan T, Öreroğlu AR, Daniel RK. Aesthet Surg J. 2013 Mar;33(3):363-75.
- Triphalangeal Thumb with Polydactyly: An Alternative Surgical Method. Öztürk MB, Gönüllü E, Öreroğlu AR, Üsçetin İ, Basat SO, Akan M. J Hand Microsurg. 2013 Jun;5(1):20-23.
- The Use of Acellular Dermal Matrix in treatment of Mitten Hand in Epidermolysis Bullosa Patients. Özkaya Ö, Öreroğlu AR, Akan M. J Hand Microsurg. 2013 Jun;5(1):46-47.
- How Much Do We Know About The Venous Thromboembolism? The Approach Of Turkish Plastic Surgeons To The Venous Thromboembolism Prophylaxis And Preferred Methods In Prophylaxis: A Survey Study. Özkaya Ö, Öztürk MB, Egemen O, Öreroğlu AR, Üsçetin İ, Tasasız K, Akan M. Turk Plast Surg. 2013;21(2):10-15.
- Concurrent repair of orbital shallowness with craniosynostosis surgery: two late cases of simultaneous orbital decompression. Öreroğlu AR, Silav G, Özkaya Ö, Orman Ç, Akan M. Turk Neurosurg. 2013;23(3):395-400.
- Bone Dust and Diced Cartilage Combined with Blood Glue: A Practical Technique for Dorsum Enhancement. Öreroğlu AR, Çakır B, Akan M. Aesthetic Plast Surg. 2014 Feb;38(1):90-4.
- Transient Leg Paralysis After Abdominal Liposuction. Öreroğlu AR. Aesthet Surg J. 2014 Jan 1;34(1):193-4.
- The Sandwiched Lateral Crural Reinforcement Graft: A Novel Technique for Lateral Crus Reinforcement in Rhinoplasty. Kuran I, Öreroğlu AR. Aesthet Surg J. 2014 Mar;34(3):383-93.
- Surface Aesthetics in Tip Rhinoplasty: Step-by-Step Surgery. Çakır B, Öreroğlu AR, Daniel RK. Aesthet Surg J. 2014 Jun 16;34(6):941-955.
- The Lateral Crural Rein Falp: A Novel Technique For Management Of Tip Rotation In Primary Rhinoplasty. Kuran İ, Öreroğlu AR, Efendioğlu K. Aesthet Surg J. 2014 Sep;34(7):1008-17.
- Saphenous Vein Sparing Superficial Inguinal Dissection in Lower Extremity Melanoma. Öztürk MB, Akan A, Özkaya Ö, Egemen O, Öreroğlu AR, Kayadibi T, Akan M. J Skin Cancer. 2014.
- Response to "Comments on 'The Lateral Crural Rein Flap: A Novel Technique for Management of Tip Rotation in Primary Rhinoplasty'. Kuran İ, Öreroğlu AR, Efendioğlu K. Aesthet Surg J. 2015 Jul;35(5).
- Recurrent Ameloblastoma in the Free Fibula Flap: Review of Literature and an Unusual Case Report. Basat SO, Öreroğlu AR, Orman Ç, Aksan T, Üsçetin İ, Akan M. J. Maxillofac. Oral Surg. 2015 Sep;14(3):821-5.
- An Unusual Deadly Craniofacial Trauma Due to Hot Liquid Plastic Infusion. Basat SO, Öreroğlu AR, etc. J Craniofac Surg. 2015 Oct;26(7):e666-7.
- Surface Aesthetics and Analysis. Çakır B, Öreroğlu AR, Daniel RK. Clin Plast Surg. 2016 Jan;43(1):1-15.
- Osteoectomy in Rhinoplasty: A New Concept in Nasal Bones Repositioning. Çakır B, Finocchi V, Tambasco D, Öreroğlu AR, Doğan T. Ann Plast Surg. 2016 June;76(6):622-8.
