= Georgetown University Medical Center =

Private medical research center in Washington, D.C.

Coordinates: 38.912°N 77.077°W

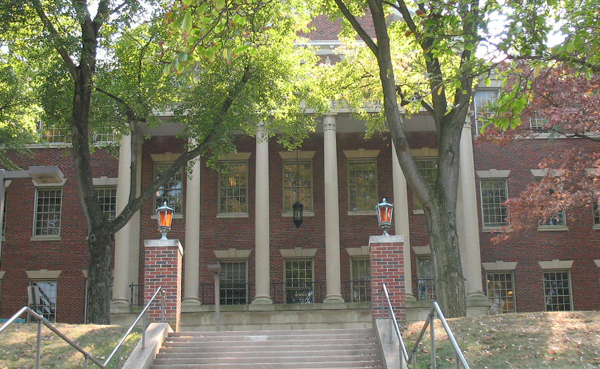
Georgetown University Medical Center in Washington, D.C.

Georgetown University Medical Center is a Washington, D.C.–based biomedical research and educational organization affiliated with Georgetown University that is responsible for over 80% of the university's sponsored research funding and is led by Norman J. Beauchamp, MD, MHS, the Executive Vice President for Health Sciences and Executive Dean of the School of Medicine.

The medical center adjoins Georgetown University Hospital on the university's main campus in Washington, D.C. It encompasses four sectors of medical education and research: Georgetown University School of Medicine, the Berkley School of Nursing, the School of Health, and the Georgetown Lombardi Comprehensive Cancer Center.

== School of Medicine ==
Founded in 1851, the School of Medicine is committed to educating medical students in the spirit of the Jesuit ideal of cura personalis, or "care of the whole person." Ranked among the top 50 medical schools in the country, in 2008 the school was ranked 40th by U.S. News & World Report. The school of Medicine is led by the Executive Dean, Norman J. Beauchamp, MD, MHS.

== School of Nursing & Health Studies ==
The School of Nursing & Health Studies is one of the four undergraduate schools at Georgetown University, and consists of four academic departments: Health Care Management and Policy, Human Science, Global Health, and Nursing. The School of Nursing & Health Studies also has 233 students in its nine graduate programs, including the Nurse Anesthesia program, ranked sixth in the nation. Carole Roan Gresenz, Ph.D., is the Interim Dean of the School of Nursing and Health Studies.

== Lombardi Comprehensive Cancer Center ==
Lombardi Comprehensive Cancer Center is the only comprehensive cancer center accredited by the National Cancer Institute (NCI) in the Washington, DC region, and one of only 41 nationwide. Named for Green Bay Packers and Washington Redskins coach Vince Lombardi, who was treated at Georgetown, Lombardi was established in 1970 as the cancer clinic at Georgetown University Hospital. Today, Lombardi has over 200 faculty and receives $100 million in research funding each year. The director of the Lombardi Comprehensive Cancer Center was Dr. Louis M. Weiner, MD, and notable faculty include Dr. Richard Schlegel, one of the innovators behind the HPV vaccine and Conditionally Reprogrammed Cells (CRC) technology.

== Biomedical Graduate Research Organization ==
The Biomedical Graduate Research Organization is responsible for more than 60% of the sponsored research conducted at the medical center. Its mission includes both basic science departments and clinical departments, as well as graduate education in the biomedical sciences. The Biomedical Graduate Research Organization is led by interim director Robert Clarke, PhD, D.Sc.

The Biomedical Graduate Education division is a subset of the Graduate School of Arts and Sciences. The degrees offered range from traditional PhDs and MS programs to MS specializations in such areas as Nuclear Non-Proliferation and Complementary/Alternative Medicine, and Certificate programs in Biotechnology, Biodefence & Public Policy, or Biohazardous Threat Agents. The Biohazardous Threat Agents graduate certificate is currently the only fully recognized graduate program at Georgetown that is available online. In 2008, the graduate programs enrolled 160 PhD students, 189 students in master's programs, and 159 students in the Special Masters Program in Physiology and Biophysics.

=== Biomedical Graduate Programs ===
PhD, MS, Cert.

- Biochemistry & Molecular Biology
- Biodefense & Public Policy
- Bioethics (Philosophy)
- Biohazardous Threat Agents & Emerging Infectious Diseases
- Biomedical Science Policy & Advocacy
- Biostatistics
- Biotechnology
- Cell Biology
- Health Physics
- Microbiology & Immunology
- Neuroscience
- Physiology & Biophysics
- Pharmacology
- Systems medicine
- Tumor Biology

== Notable Research and Development ==
Researchers at Georgetown have been behind several medical innovations.

- Conditionally Reprogrammed Cells (CRC) technology was developed by Drs. Schlegel and Liu, it has become known as the "Georgetown Method". This cell technology holds vast scientific and clinical potential.
- The HPV vaccine was partially developed by a team of Georgetown researchers led by Dr. Richard Schlegel, at the Lombardi Cancer Center.
- The anti-histamine Allegra was created by Dr. Raymond Woosley, former chairman of the Department of Pharmacology.
- Robert Ledley, DDS, developed the Full-Body Scanner and the Automatic Genetic Analyzer during his time at Georgetown.
- Intravascular Surgical Treatment was developed by Alfred Luessenhop MD, former chief of neurosurgery, who pioneered the field of interventional neuro-radiology, creating an entirely new approach to the treatment of vascular disease using blood vessels in the brain.
- First Artificial Heart Valve and Implant Surgery was created by Charles Hufnagel MD, professor of experimental surgery. In 1960, Hufnagel introduced the first artificial heart valve and successfully performed the implantation surgery the following year.

== Partnership with MedStar Health ==
On June 30, 2000, Georgetown University Medical Center and MedStar Health, Inc., finalized a clinical partnership agreement. Under the terms of the agreement, MedStar Health owns, operates, and has financial responsibility for Georgetown University's clinical enterprise, which includes the Georgetown University Hospital, a faculty practice group, and a network of community physician practices. The Medstar part of the Medical Center (but not the GU part) is posted as smoke free both indoors and outdoors.
