= Dina N. Paltoo =

American epidemiologist

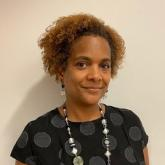
- Paltoo in 2020
- Education: Howard University; Johns Hopkins Bloomberg School of Public Health
- Scientific career
- Fields: Epidemiology, open science, data science
- Workplaces: United States National Library of Medicine; National Heart, Lung, and Blood Institute

Dina Nicole Paltoo is an American epidemiologist specializing in open science, data science, and public access. In 2024 Paltoo was named acting deputy director of policy and external affairs, National Library of Medicine.

== Education ==
Paltoo completed a B.S. in Microbiology and Ph.D. in Physiology and Biophysics from Howard University. Her 1996 dissertation was titled Modulation of cisplatin cytotoxicity by terbium and hyperthermia in FaDu human head and neck cancer cells.

Paltoo earned a M.P.H. from the Johns Hopkins Bloomberg School of Public Health. She was a postdoctoral fellow in cellular biophysics and biochemistry at the University of Medicine and Dentistry of New Jersey. Paltoo completed the cancer prevention fellowship program at the National Cancer Institute where her research focus was molecular epidemiology.

== Career ==
Paltoo worked as a program director at the National Heart, Lung, and Blood Institute (NHLBI), where she maintained a scientific portfolio in genetics, pharmacogenetics, and personalized medicine. She later joined the United States National Library of Medicine (NLM) as the director of the division of scientific data sharing policy and the director of the genetics, health, and society program within the National Institutes of Health Office of Science Policy (OSP) and was responsible for NIH policy efforts and ethical considerations in scientific data sharing and management, open science, and genomics and health. Paltoo became the assistant director of policy development and led the NLM's policy and legislative activities that promoted responsible stewardship and access to scientific and clinical data and information, as well as for health information technology.

Paltoo returned to the NHLBI as the assistant director for scientific strategy and innovation in the immediate office of the director. She serves as a senior advisor to the NHLBI Director and provides strategic direction to scientific initiatives and programs related to the NHLBI mission. In her various roles at NIH, Paltoo has partnered across the NIH, Department of Health and Human Services, and Federal agencies on initiatives and activities relevant to open science, data science, and public access.
