= John Ring =

John Ring may refer to:

- John Ring (American physician), president of the American Medical Association
- John Ring (surgeon), English surgeon, vaccination activist, and man of letters
- John F. Ring, American lawyer and chairman of the National Labor Relations Board
- Johnny Ring, Welsh rugby union and rugby league player
- Joey Ring (1758–1800), English cricketer
