= Lana Skirboll =

American government official

Lana Skirboll is the former director of the National Institutes of Health Office of Science Policy.

== Biography ==
Skirboll is an international leader in science policy.

She graduated from New York University in 1970 with a bachelor's degree in Biology and completed a master's degree in Physiology in 1972 at Miami University (Ohio). She received her Ph.D. with honors from the Department of Pharmacology, Georgetown University School of Medicine in 1977, and conducted her postdoctoral training in the Departments of Psychiatry and Pharmacology at the Yale School of Medicine. Following her postdoctoral training, she was a Fogarty Fellow at the Karolinska Institute in Stockholm, Sweden in the laboratory of Tomas Hökfelt. Dr. Skirboll is the author of more than 75 scientific publications. After leaving Stockholm, Dr. Skirboll was chief of the Electrophysiology Unit in the Intramural Research Program of the U.S. National Institute of Mental Health (NIMH) prior to joining the U.S. Alcohol Drug Abuse and Mental Health Administration (ADAMHA), as the Deputy Science Advisor. She was subsequently appointed as the Chief of Staff to the Agency Administrator and Associate Administrator for Science, where she focused on animals in research and patent policy. In 1992, when ADAMHA was reorganized and its three research Institutes (NIMH, NIDA, and NIAAA) returned to the NIH, Dr. Skirboll was appointed Director of the Office of Science Policy in the NIMH.

In 1995, Harold Varmus, Director of the U.S. National Institutes of Health (NIH) appointed Dr. Skirboll as Director of the NIH Office of Science Policy. During her tenure, she managed a wide range of policy issues, including the ethical, legal, social, and economic implications of biomedical research; human subject protections; the privacy and confidentiality of research records; conflicts of interest; genetics, health, and society; and dual use research, among others. Her office was responsible for NIH's oversight of gene therapy research, including the activities of the Recombinant DNA Advisory Committee (RAC) as well as for the activities of the HHS Secretary's Advisory Committee on Genetics, Health and Society; the Secretary's Advisory Committee on Xenotransplantation; the National Science Advisory Board for Biosecurity (NSABB); the Clinical Research Policy Analysis and Coordination Program (CRpac); and the NIH Office of Science Education. Dr. Skirboll was the NIH liaison to the U.S. Food and Drug Administration, the Foundation for the NIH, and the HHS Office for Human Research Protections. Her work involved collaboration within the U.S. Government, industry, and foreign governments and institutions.

Under three Presidential Administrations, Dr. Skirboll was the agency’s lead on policy issues related to fetal tissue, cloning, and stem cell research. She was responsible for drafting both the 2000 and 2009 NIH Guidelines for Research Using Human Embryonic Stem Cells.

Starting 2003, Dr. Skirboll worked with NIH Director Elias Zerhouni in creating the NIH Roadmap for Medical Research, the Trans-NIH Nanotechnology Task Force and the NIH program on Public-Private Partnerships. In 2009, Zerhouni named Skirboll to serve as Acting NIH Deputy Director for, and Director of the Division of Program Coordination, Planning, and Strategic Initiatives (DPCPSI), the NIH entity responsible for the NIH Common Fund. In this capacity, Dr. Skirboll directed national efforts to identify and address emerging scientific opportunities and rising public health challenges through biomedical research. In addition, Dr. Skirboll directed efforts to develop NIH’s portfolio analysis capabilities and was chair of the NIH Council of Councils. In addition, Dr. Skirboll oversaw NIH’s office of evaluation and the program offices responsible for coordination of research and activities related to research on AIDS, behavioral and social sciences, women's health, disease prevention, rare diseases, and dietary supplements—efforts that reside in DPCPSI as a result of implementing requirements of the NIH Reform Act of 2006. Dr. Skirboll has received three DHHS Secretarial Awards for Distinguished Service and a Presidential Rank Award of Meritorious Executive.

In May 2010, Skirboll joined former NIH Director Elias Zerhouni in a new global science and health consulting firm, the Zerhouni Group, LLC. She recently retired from Vice President and Head of Science Policy at the pharmaceutical company Sanofi after 10 years of service.

== Personal life ==
Skirboll resides in Alexandria, VA and is married to architect and hospital administrator, Leonard Taylor, Jr., who was Senior Vice President for Asset Management at the University of Maryland Medical Systems . She has two grown children, Patrick and Eleanor, and four grandchildren.
