= David A. Hidalgo =

American plastic surgeon

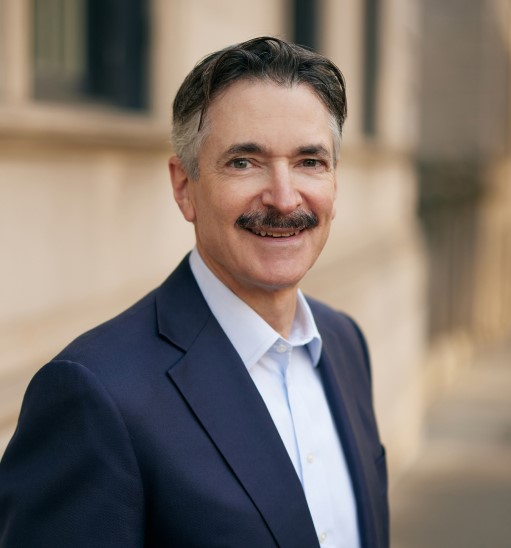
- Born: David Arthur Hidalgo; July 30, 1952 (age 74); Hartford, Connecticut, U.S.
- Education: Georgetown University (B.S., M.D.)
- Occupation: Plastic surgeon
- Known for: Fibula free flap jaw reconstruction, aesthetic plastic surgery
- Spouse: Mary Ann Tighe

David A. Hidalgo is an American reconstructive and aesthetic plastic surgeon, author, and visual artist. He holds the academic title of Clinical Professor of Surgery at Weill Cornell Medical College (New York-Presbyterian) in New York City.

During his tenure as the former Chief of the Plastic and Reconstructive Service at Memorial Sloan-Kettering Cancer Center in New York, Hidalgo performed the first fibula free flap for mandible (jaw) reconstruction. This procedure, performed in cancer patients, utilized microsurgical techniques to preserve the viability of the bone transplant. Additional development of the technique delineated its unique advantages. Subsequent publications established it as the standard of care worldwide.

== Biography ==
=== Early life and education ===
Hidalgo was born in Hartford, Connecticut. His father, Enrique Hidalgo, an orphan from Guayaquil, Ecuador, graduated from the Massachusetts Institute of Technology and was an aerospace engineer during the Cold War. He married Liselotte Schlumberger. Hidalgo attended Georgetown University in Washington, D.C., where he completed a bachelor of science degree in fine arts and biology in 1974. He subsequently earned a medical degree at Georgetown and then completed residencies in general surgery, plastic surgery, and a fellowship in microsurgery, all at New York University Medical Center (now NYU Langone Health) in 1985.

=== Career ===
Hidalgo was certified by the American Board of Surgery in 1985 and the American Board of Plastic Surgery in 1987.

His initial experience with the fibula-free flap for mandible reconstruction was documented in the publication Fibula Free Flap: A New Method of Mandible Reconstruction. This article was ranked sixth of the 25 most cited articles on plastic surgery for the last 50 years. Hidalgo established a fellowship training program in microsurgery during his tenure at Memorial.

Hidalgo has authored over 100 scientific papers on microsurgical techniques for reconstructive surgery, facial aesthetic surgery, and body contouring surgery. These articles have appeared in Plastic and Reconstructive Surgery, Aesthetic Surgery Journal, and the Annals of Plastic Surgery. His microsurgery textbook, Microsurgery in Trauma (Futura Publishing Co., 1987), was written with the late microsurgeon William Shaw.

Hidalgo was the recipient of the James Barrett Brown Award in 1992 for his work on mandible reconstruction. He was the national visiting professor for the Plastic Surgery Educational Foundation in 2002, and was the Cosmetic Section editor for Plastic and Reconstructive Surgery, from 2012 to 2020. Hidalgo was the 2021 V.H. Kazanjian Visiting Professor at Hansjorg Wyss Department of Plastic Surgery, NYU Langone Health, New York University.

Hidalgo is a member of the American Society of Plastic Surgeons, the American College of Surgeons, and the American Society for Aesthetic Plastic Surgery.

=== Philanthropy ===
In 2001, Hidalgo and his family established Joan's Legacy, which would become Uniting Against Lung Cancer. It became the largest private foundation funding lung cancer research in the United States, having funded $11.5 million in research grants, and another $57 million in follow-on funding by grantees. In 2015 it merged with the Lung Cancer Research Foundation.

Through the Hidalgo-Tighe Foundation Hidalgo and his wife support the Lung Cancer Research Foundation, the Inner City Scholarship Fund, St. Patrick’s Cathedral, Georgetown University, Lincoln Center, Cardinal Spellman High School, and the Perlman Performing Arts Center.

He received the 2022 Founders Award from the Lung Cancer Research Foundation for his seminal efforts in the private funding of lung cancer research.

== Personal life ==
Hidalgo is married to Mary Ann Tighe, a commercial real estate broker.
