= Mary Ann Tighe =

American businesswoman (born 1948)

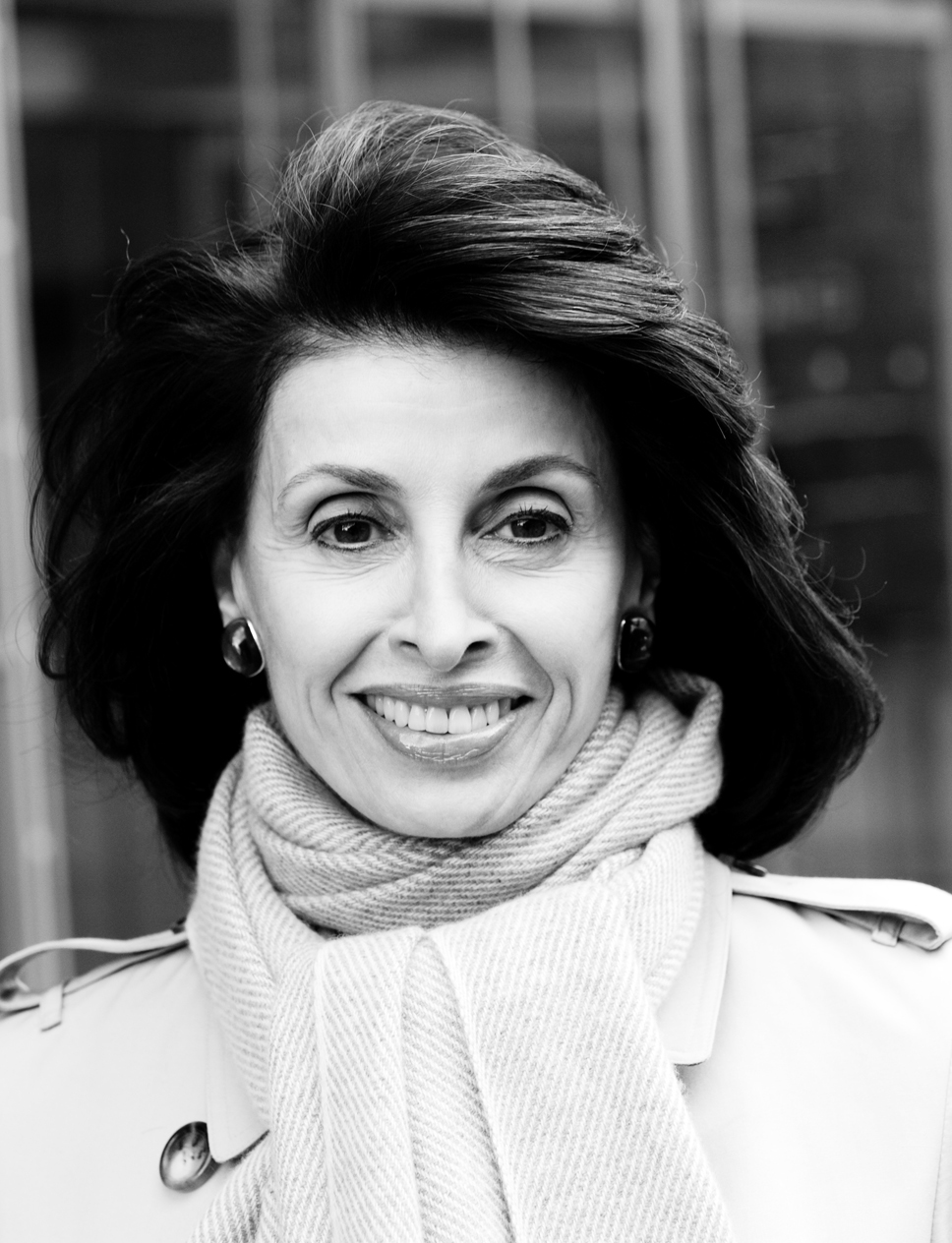
- portrait by Arthur Elgort, 2008
- Born: Mary Ann Scarangello; August 24, 1948 (age 78); Bronx, New York, United States
- Education: University of Maryland, M.A., Art History; Catholic University of America, B.A., English
- Occupations: CEO, CBRE's New York Tri-State office (Global real estate brokerage firm) Director, The Howard Hughes Corporation
- Spouse(s): David A. Hidalgo, MD (m. 1979)
- Children: Aaron M. Tighe (b. 1971)

Mary Ann Tighe (née Scarangello; born August 24, 1948) is an American commercial real estate broker and the CEO of the New York Tri-State Region of CBRE, the world's largest commercial real estate services firm. She has made commercial transactions totaling more than 133.5 million square feet and has been cited as a groundbreaker in a traditionally male-dominated industry. Her deals have anchored more than 16.4 million square feet of new construction in the New York region, a total believed to be a record in commercial brokerage. Tighe has been named to Crain's New York Business Most Powerful Women in New York since the listing was inaugurated in 2007, ranking #1 in 2011 across all New York City industries. In 2018, she was named to the Crain's Business Hall of Fame, and in 2021, she was named to Crain’s list of the “25 Most Powerful New Yorkers."

== Biography ==
=== Early life and education ===
Tighe grew up in the South Bronx, one of three children born to Italian-Americans Edith and Frank P. Scarangello. Tighe says "My mom was the secretary at the church rectory. My father managed a warehouse for Timken Roller Bearing Company."

She attended Cardinal Spellman High School, then went to Catholic University of America in Washington, D.C. as a Timken Scholar, receiving a B.A. in English and graduating Phi Beta Kappa, magna cum laude, and then received her master's in art history from the University of Maryland.

=== Career ===
Tighe became a fellow at the Smithsonian while finishing her master's degree, and moved on to join the White House Domestic Policy staff, serving as Arts Advisor to Vice President Walter Mondale. She subsequently was hired to be Deputy Chair of the National Endowment for the Arts. While in these arts-related roles, Tighe co-authored an art history textbook, Art America, published by McGraw-Hill, and wrote numerous articles for The New York Times and Vogue, as well as teaching art history at Georgetown University.

She returned to live in New York City in 1981, where she parlayed her experience in fine arts into a career in the cable TV industry, becoming a vice president at American Broadcasting Company Video Enterprises. While there, Tighe launched the A&E Channel.

Tighe's career in commercial real estate began when she was 36, while she was in Venice during a purchase for A&E. After she was hired by the Edward S. Gordon Company (albeit with no prior experience), Tighe did no transactions for 18 months. Then, Tighe was mentored by real estate broker Carol Nelson, which is when Tighe's real estate career took off. Tighe was promoted to the position of Vice Chairman of Insignia/ESG and then joined CBRE in 2002 as CEO of the New York Tri-State Region, which takes in 4,500 employees as of 2026.

Tighe helped drive some of the most influential projects in New York City's recent history, including the revitalization of Times Square when she brought Condé Nast there in 1996. Similarly, Condé Nast's subsequent relocation to One World Trade Center in 2014, a deal brokered by Tighe and her team, was described as a harbinger of the cultural revitalization of Lower Manhattan while deals such as Ogilvy & Mather’s 2008 worldwide headquarters relocation to 565,000 square feet at 636 Eleventh Avenue (a former candy factory) and Coach’s 2013 purchase of a condo interest in 10 Hudson Yards represent a shift west of Midtown Manhattan’s CBD (central business district).

Tighe served as Chairman of the Real Estate Board of New York for a three-year term starting in January 2010. She was the first woman to hold the position in REBNY’s 114-year history and the first broker in 30 years. In a 2013 interview, Tighe said that when she first came to REBNY’s annual banquet in the early ’90s, she was "invisible" and "trampled", and now, she felt like everyone knew her and she knew everyone. During her tenure as Chair, she advocated for the rezoning of Midtown East, as well as created a position for a technology officer to establish a broader web and social media presence for REBNY.

=== Recent work ===
In 2026, Tighe represented Silverstein Properties in its landmark agreement with American Express at 2 World Trade Center, a 2-million-sq.ft. transaction that marked the final phase of the World Trade Center’s redevelopment. In the same year, Tighe arranged the sale of the land beneath the Lotte New York Palace Hotel for $491 million on behalf of the Archdiocese of New York.

In 2025, Tighe represented Sotheby's in the $513 million sale of 1334 York Avenue. In Brooklyn, she represented Tishman Speyer in leasing activity at 422 Fulton Street, where Brooklyn Prospect Charter School signed a 35-year lease for more than 120,000 square feet. At the South Street Seaport, she represented Seaport Entertainment Group in a 20-year, 75,000-square-foot lease with immersive arts and entertainment company Meow Wolf at Pier 17.

Tighe represented Sotheby’s in its $100 million purchase of the former Whitney Museum at 945 Madison Avenue in 2024, a transaction that won REBNY’s 2025 Robert T. Lawrence Memorial Award for Deal of the Year. That same year, she secured Christie’s American headquarters by extending and expanding its presence at 20. Rockefeller Plaza for an additional 25 years, through 2050. She also represented the Archdiocese of New York in a 30-year, 142,308-square-foot lease at 488 Madison Avenue.

In 2023, she represented Sotheby’s ownership in a 30-year, 250,000-square-foot lease to Weill Cornell at 1334 York Avenue and represented PJT in a 270,000-square-foot renewal and expansion at 280 Park Avenue.

Among Tighe's notable transactions, in 2022 she represented FOX Corporation 20-year, 665,666-square-foot lease extension at 1211 Avenue of the Americas and News Corp in a 20-year, 406,737-square-foot lease extension at the same property.

In 2021, Tighe represented NBCUniversal in the renewal of its 339,833-square-foot lease at 1221 Avenue of the Americas, one of the largest office lease renewals in Manhattan that year.

In 2019 Tighe sold Young & Rubicam's 3 Columbus Circle condominium to the Moinian Group and completed a leaseback of 214,372 sq. ft. at the building for Y&R. She also restructured and extended Colgate-Palmolive's global headquarters in a 241,657 sq. ft. lease at 300 Park Avenue.

Also in 2019, Tighe succeeded in helping to pass Greater Midtown East rezoning, an effort begun in 2011 while serving as REBNY chairman.

In 2018, Tighe represented 1199-SEIU Benefit Fund for Health & Human Services Employees in its 30-year, 400,000 sq. ft. lease at 498 7th Avenue.

In 2017, she represented 21st Century Fox in its 784,000-square-foot headquarters extension and expansion at 1211 Avenue of the Americas and News Corp in a new 440,000-square-foot headquarters lease at 1211 Avenue of the Americas.

In 2016, she represented Coach in its 693,938-square-foot leaseback at 10 Hudson Yards; ownership of 55 Water Street in the biggest leasing deal since 2014, McGraw Hill Financial's 900,027-square-foot renewal; and L&L Holding Company in the 200,000-square-foot anchor lease to Citadel at the Foster + Partners-designed 425 Park Avenue, with a penthouse-level asking rent of $300 per square foot, the city's most expensive office at the time.

Tighe has headed the list of CBRE's top firm-wide producers in 2008, 2011, 2014, 2016 and 2017.

== Personal life ==
Tighe married at age 20, but divorced soon after the birth of her son in 1971. She met David Hidalgo, when he was 19 and she was his art history professor at Georgetown University. They were married in 1979. He was chairman of Memorial Sloan Kettering Cancer Center's Department of Plastic and Reconstructive Surgery from 1992 to 2000. He is currently a plastic surgeon in private practice in Manhattan.

== Other work ==
=== Affiliations and mentoring ===
Listed as number 163 (and one of only 25 women) on Crain’s list of Most Connected New Yorkers in 2014, Tighe was described as a "seasoned professional who works in a business with tentacles in many other industries, and who actively participates in numerous civic and charitable causes."

Tighe is chairman emeritus of REBNY; director emeritus of The New 42nd Street; a board member of The Howard Hughes Holdings; an advisory board member of National Grid; and chair for the New York City Economic Development Corporation’s Real Estate Life Sciences Board.

Having credited Carol Nelson for mentoring her as a young broker, Tighe stated that mentorship is key to business growth. Tighe, in turn, mentors young women in the industry, stating in 2009 that she is mentoring "a group of young women in their mid-20s to mid-30s whom I call hardcore real estate women. I’m very engaged with this group because they’re the generation that’s going to make it commonplace for women to be at the negotiating tables and for women to be at the top tier of the industry."

=== Philanthropy ===
Tighe is also a longstanding philanthropist, serving on the boards and executive committees of numerous organizations. Her roles have included trustee of St. Patrick’s Cathedral; trustee of the Archdiocese of New York; co-chair of The Metropolitan Museum of Art’s Business Committee and Real Estate Council; former chair of Columbia University’s Real Estate Development (RED) Advisory Board; and board member of Lincoln Center for the Performing Arts and The Ronald O. Perelman Performing Arts Center (PAC).

Tighe's sister, journalist Joan Scarangello McNeive, died of lung cancer in 2001 at the age of 47, despite never having smoked. With her family and friends, Tighe founded Joan's Legacy to honor her sister. Tighe's mother, also a non-smoker, died from the disease. In 2009 Joan's Legacy became Uniting Against Lung Cancer, reflecting the foundation's commitment to uniting all families and organizations dedicated to conquering lung cancer. In a merger approved in May 2015, Uniting Against Lung Cancer elected to merge with the Lung Cancer Research Foundation, another organization dedicated to cancer research.

A scholarship student herself, Tighe co-founded the Scarangello Scholarship program in 1982 at Cardinal Spellman High School. The program honors the memory of Tighe's parents by providing a college-preparatory Catholic high school education to six selected students at the school each year. She also funds scholarships to Saints Peter and Paul, her grade school, through the Inner-City Scholarship Fund.

== Honors ==
Tighe received the Real Estate Board of New York's Deal of the Year Award for ingenious brokerage 11 times, a record number of wins since the award was created in 1944.

In 2025, she received ULI New York’s Visionary Leadership in Land Use Award. The award recognizes a leader in New York’s real estate community whose body of work exemplifies ULI’s mission and values and has had a transformational impact on New York City.

Previously she received the Louis Smadbeck Memorial Broker Recognition Award, REBNY's highest award in brokerage, and REBNY's Bernard H. Mendik Lifetime Achievement Award.In 2023, she was honored with REBNY’s Harry B. Helmsley Distinguished New Yorker Award and the New York Building Congress Jack and Lewis Rudin Award for Service to New York City. Tighe was the first woman to receive the NYU Schack Institute of Real Estate Urban Leadership Award. In 2021, she received the Skyscraper Museum Making New York History Award. She has also been recognized with the Commercial Property Executive 2021 Lifetime Achievement Award. In 2019 at the 74th Annual Al Smith Gala, she was honored by the NY Archdiocese with the Happy Warrior Award, the first woman to be given that award.

In 2014, the American Institute of Architects honored her at its Heritage Ball. In her gratitude speech, Tighe named the many architects and engineers who taught her about civic engagement, including Henry N. Cobb, Norman Foster, Bjarke Ingels, and Renzo Piano.
