= Marie R. Griffin =

American vaccine researcher

Academic background
- Education: A.B., Immaculata University; MD, 1976, Georgetown University; MPH, Johns Hopkins University

Academic work
- Institutions: Vanderbilt University Medical Center

Marie R. Griffin is an American vaccine researcher. She is a Professor of Medicine and holds the Endowed Directorship in Public Health Research and Education at Vanderbilt University Medical Center.

== Early life and education ==
Griffin earned her Bachelor of Arts degree from Immaculata University, her medical degree from Georgetown University School of Medicine, and Master's in Public Health from Johns Hopkins University.

== Career ==
Upon completing her education in 1986, Griffin became one of the first women join the faculty at Vanderbilt University Medical Center as a tenure-tracked assistant professor. In this role, she reviewed 129,834 cases of the whooping cough vaccine and found that it was completely safe for infants. She was promoted to associate professor in 1990 and Full professor in 1995. As a Full professor, Griffin became the principal investigator of the national DEcIDE (Developing Evidence to Inform Decisions about Effectiveness) Research Network, which conducts "accelerated practical studies about the outcomes, comparative clinical effectiveness, safety and appropriateness of health care items and services." In recognition of her efforts, Griffin was elected a Fellow of the American College of Physicians.

In 2014, Griffin replaced William Cooper to lead Vanderbilt's participation in Mini-Sentinel, a five-year, $120 million pilot program for safety surveillance. She received around $250,000 per year from the FDA to help cover drug and device safety surveillance infrastructure costs. Through this role, she authored a paper finding that the pneumococcal vaccine for infants and young children resulted in a 27 per cent decline in pneumonia hospital admissions across the state among children under age 2. Griffin was then appointed Director of the Master of Public Health program, which she had co-founded, in 2014. As a result of her academic accomplishments, Griffin was appointed by Metro Nashville Mayor Megan Barry to sit on Greenways for Nashville, an advisory committee for the Greenways Commission. In 2017, Griffin earned the Mary Jane Werthan Award for her "contributions to the advancement of women at Vanderbilt on a systemic level." Following this, she was appointed the Endowed Directorship in Public Health Research and Education.

During the COVID-19 pandemic, Griffin was appointed to sit on the Vanderbilt Public Health Advisory Task Force in response to COVID-19. She was also the recipient of the Elaine Sanders-Bush Award for Mentoring Graduate and/or Medical Students in the Research Setting. By May, Griffin was honored as emeriti faculty for her years of service.
