= Margaret Storkan =

American dermatologist and clinical professor of dermatology

- Born: Margaret Ann Storkan; September 1, 1919
- Died: December 3, 2000 (aged 81)
- Education: Creighton University
- Occupation: Dermatologist
- Known for: Work on the SS Hope
- Medical career
- Institutions: University of Southern California
- Research: Leprosy

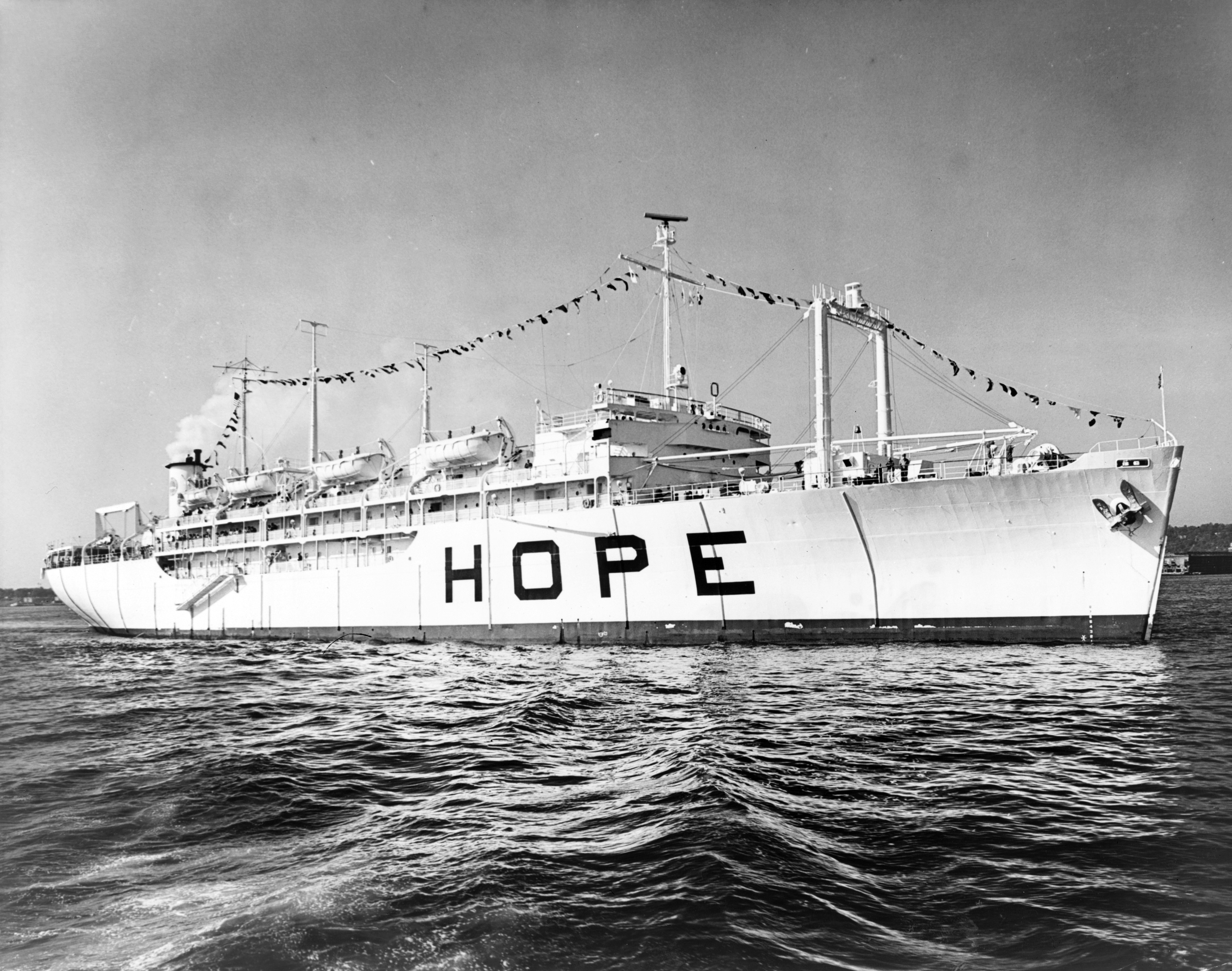
SS Hope, 1964

Margaret Ann Storkan (September 1, 1919 – December 3, 2000) was an American dermatologist who was clinical professor of dermatology at the University of Southern California. She was particularly known for her work on the sailings of the hospital ship SS Hope to the developing world and for her leprosy clinic in California.

She graduated in medicine from Creighton University School of Medicine in 1944, before working her way to professorship and a busy dermatology clinic at Redondo Beach. In addition, she was a co-founder of The History of Dermatology Society, the first woman vice-president of the American Academy of Dermatology (AAD), and the second woman to be elected to the AAD board of directors.

== Early life ==
Margaret Storkan was born on September 1, 1919. She studied at the Creighton University School of Medicine, qualifying MD in 1944, and trained in dermatology at the University of Minnesota and the University of Southern California (USC).

== Career ==
Storkan was clinical professor of dermatology at USC and ran a busy clinic in Redondo Beach, California.

Between 1962 and 1972, she took seven trips on the SS Hope ("Health Opportunity for People Everywhere") where she was the only dermatologist. The ship called on countries in the developing world and Storkan's job was to pass on the latest developments in dermatology to local doctors. She initiated the painting of the wards at the leprosarium. Ashore, she ran a leprosy clinic for USC in San Pedro.

She was one of the founders of The History of Dermatology Society in 1973 and in the same year was the first woman vice-president of the American Academy of Dermatology (AAD). She was the second woman to be elected to the AAD board of directors, serving from 1971 to 1973.

== Death and legacy ==
Storkan died at her home in Redondo Beach, on December 3, 2000.

== Selected publications ==
- Mansfield, Richard E. (1969). "Evaluation of the Earlobe in Leprosy". Archives of Dermatology. 100 (4): 407. doi:10.1001/archderm.1969.01610280025003.
- Storkan, Margaret ANN (1993). "Women in Dermatology?a Personal View I". International Journal of Dermatology. 32 (12): 863. doi:10.1111/j.1365-4362.1993.tb01398.x. PMID 8125684. S2CID 44557699.
