= SS Hope =

Hospital ship operated by Project HOPE

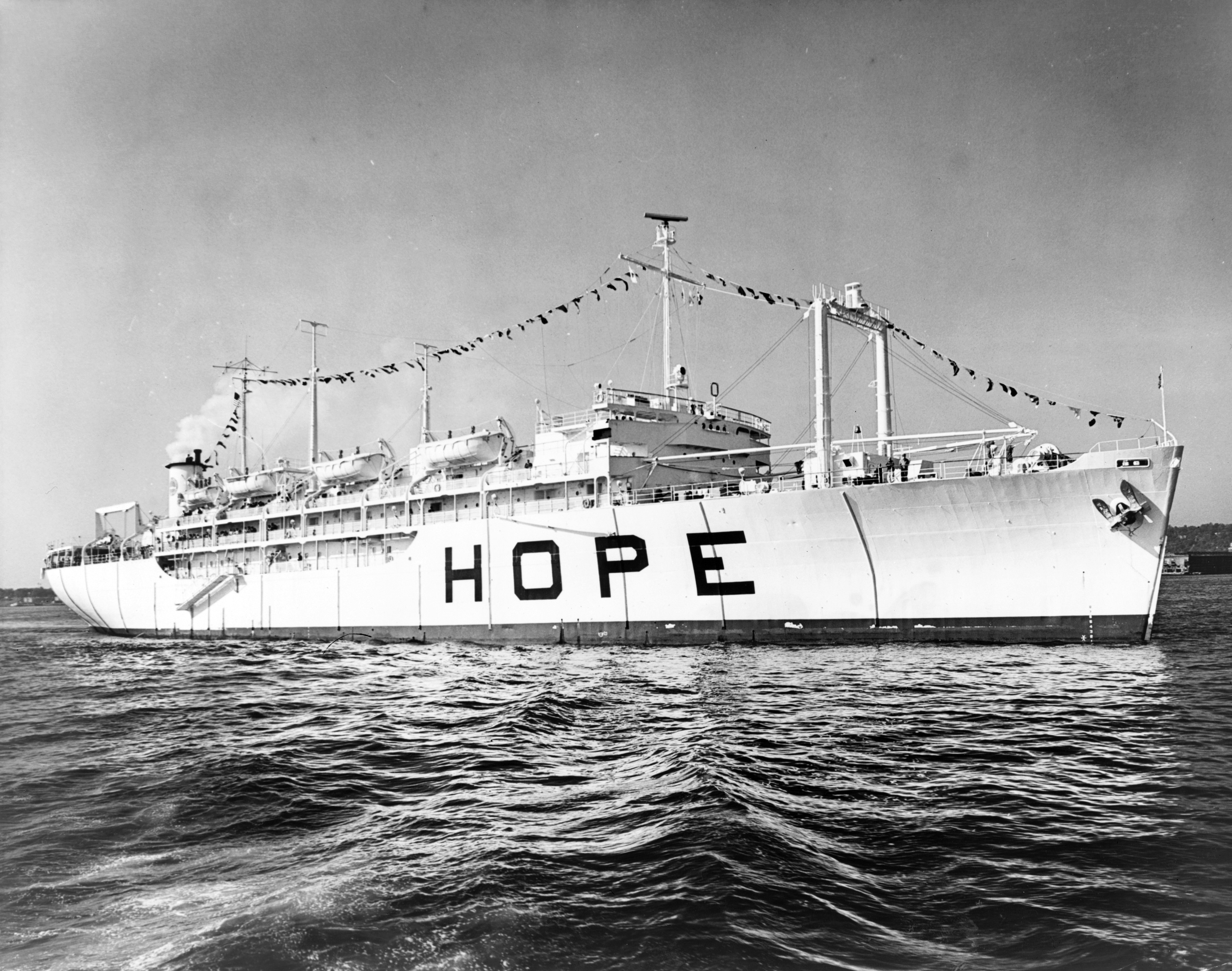

History

United States
- Ordered: 1944
- Builder: Sun Shipbuilding and Dry Dock Company at Chester, Pennsylvania
- Launched: 1945
- Acquired: 1958
- In service: 1960
- Out of service: 1974
- Fate: Scrapped in 1975

General characteristics
- Class & type: Haven-class hospital ship
- Displacement: 11,141 tons (light); 15,000 tons (full load)
- Length: 520 ft (160 m)
- Beam: 71 ft 6 in (21.79 m)
- Draft: 24 ft (7.3 m)
- Propulsion: Geared turbine engines, single screw
- Speed: 18 knots (33 km/h; 21 mph)

SS Hope was a hospital ship operated by Project HOPE. This vessel was originally a US Navy hospital ship, USS Consolation (AH-15). Consolation was donated to Project Hope in 1958, and under its new name served from 1960 until 1974, when she was retired. Hope was not replaced, and the emphasis of Project HOPE switched entirely to land-based operations. The project was founded by William B. Walsh.

== List of voyages ==
While in charitable service from 1960 to 1974, this ship voyaged around the world:

- Voyage 1, to Indonesia and South Vietnam, September 1960 – September 1961
- Voyage 2, to Peru, May 1962 – March 1963
- Voyage 3, to Ecuador, November 1963 – September 1964
- Voyage 4, to Guinea, September 1964 – September 1965
- Voyage 5, to Nicaragua, January 1966 – November 1966
- Voyage 6, to Colombia, February 1967 – December 1967
- Voyage 7, to Ceylon (Sri Lanka), February 1968 – March 1969
- Voyage 8, to Tunisia, August 1969 – August 1970
- Voyage 9, to the West Indies, January 1971 – November 1971
- Voyages 10 and 11, to Brazil, February 1972 – March 1974

At the end of the Ecuador mission, SS Hope left a medical training team at Cuenca. In November 1965 this probably saved the lives of ornithologist Raymond Andrew Paynter Jr. and his wife, which had been attacked and severely wounded by superstitous villagers in the mountains.

== Features ==
One special piece of equipment was a machine called the Iron Cow. Using distilled seawater, combined with milk solids and butterfat, it was capable of turning out 1,000 gallons of milk daily.

This 15,000-ton ship had a pharmacy, three operating rooms, a radiology department, an isolation ward, and closed-circuit television for viewing operations. The medical crew typically consisted of 150 nurses and 100 doctors, who taught American practices in various medical specialties, to colleagues around the world.

== See also ==
- Margaret Storkan
