= Project HOPE =

Healthcare organization in Bethesda, United States

- Formation: 1958
- Founder: William B. Walsh
- Type: International nonprofit 501(c)(3) organization
- Headquarters: Washington, DC
- President & CEO: Rabih Torbay
- Website: https://www.projecthope.org/

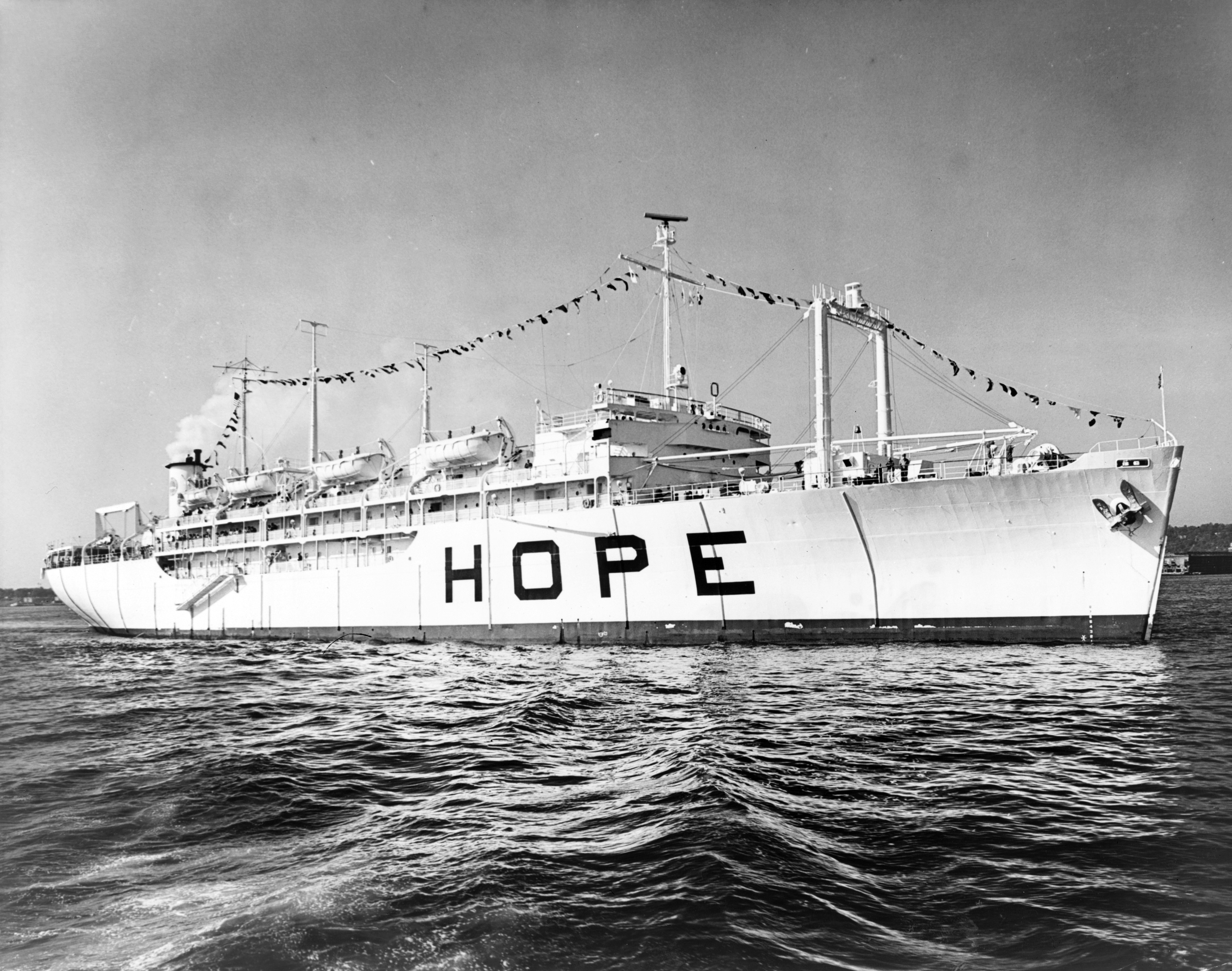
The Hospital ship SS Hope

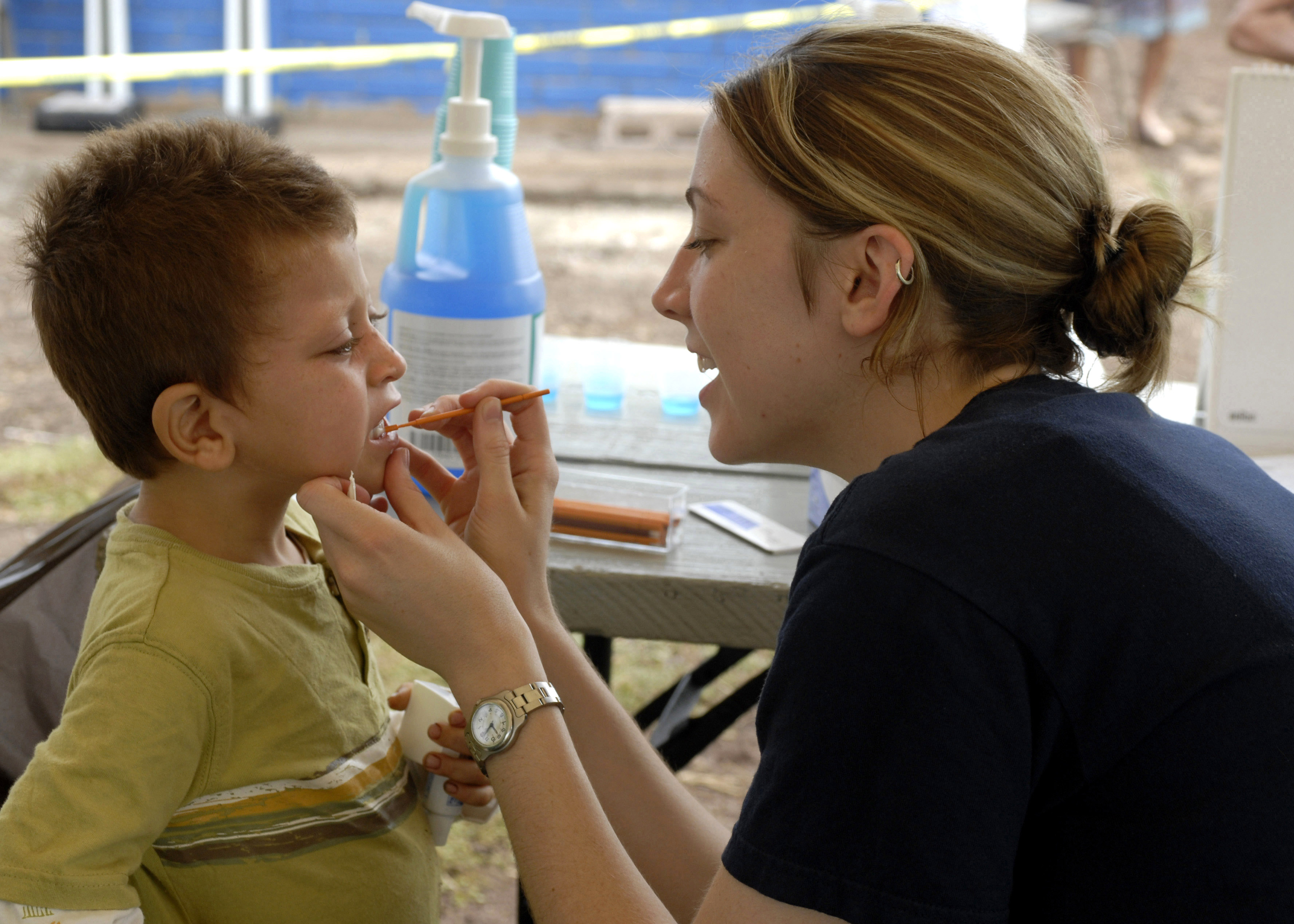
Project HOPE member gives a Salvadoran boy a fluoride treatment at the Canton la Sunza school, 2008

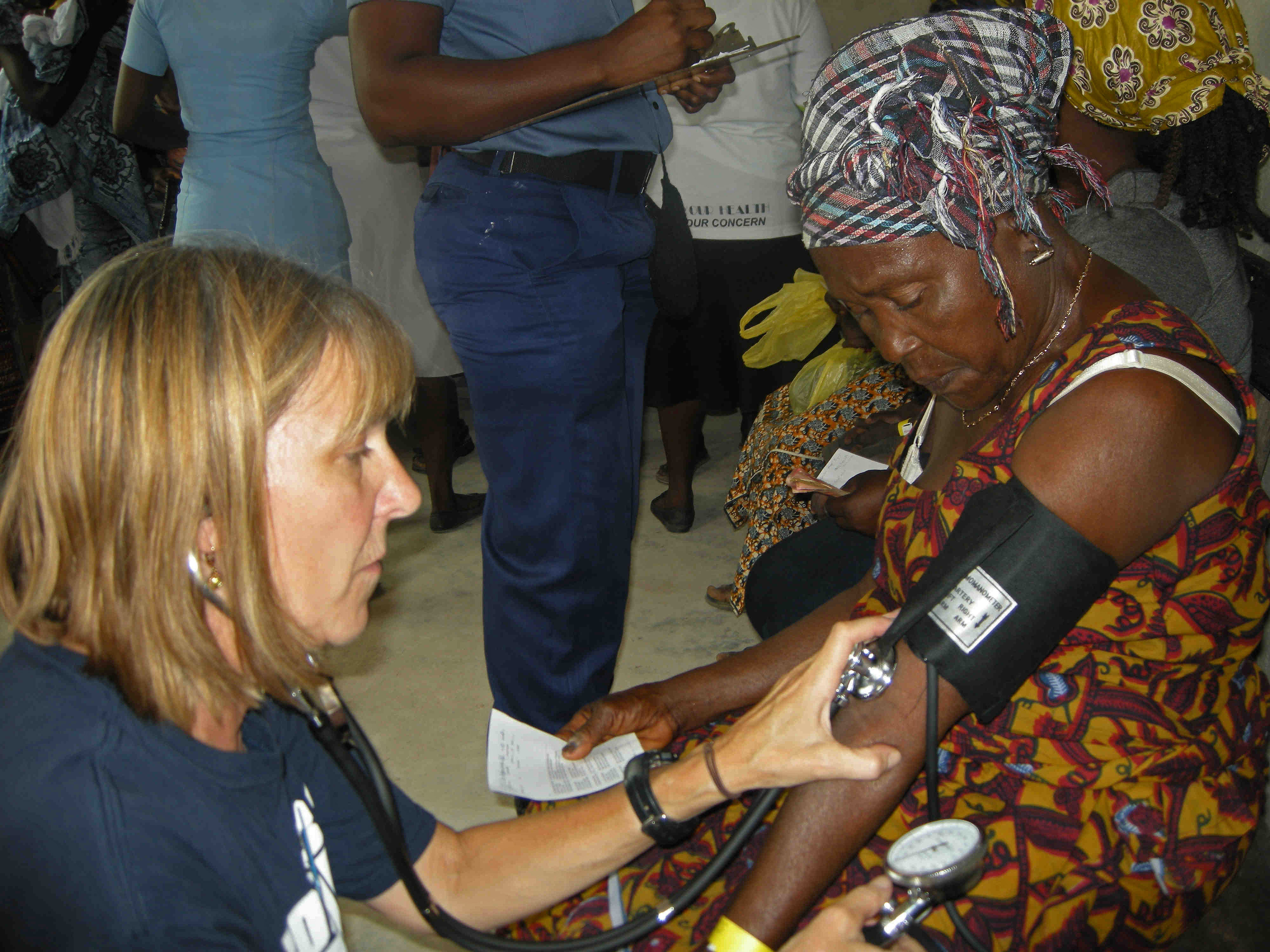
A volunteer nurse from Project Hope checks a patient's vitals in Ghana, 2012

Project HOPE (Health Opportunities for People Everywhere) is an international global health and humanitarian aid non-governmental organization founded in the United States in 1958. Project HOPE operates in five primary areas: disasters and health crises; infectious diseases; non-communicable diseases; maternal, neonatal, and child health; and health policy. The organization has been led by President and CEO Rabih Torbay since 2019.

Project HOPE helps different developing countries in efforts to eradicate infectious diseases like HIV/AIDS and tuberculosis. They also help educate parents on how to prevent and treat diseases for their children and themselves, and also train health professionals. Project HOPE also establishes village health banks, which provide small loans to women, enabling them to improve their health and that of their families.

== History ==
Project HOPE's founding began with the SS Hope, the first peacetime hospital ship (converted from the USS Consolation (AH-15)). Project HOPE's founding and early years received strong support from private sector businesses and the U.S. government.

The SS Hope was retired in 1974, after sailing to Indonesia, South Vietnam, Peru, Ecuador, Guinea, Nicaragua, Colombia, Ceylon (Sri Lanka), Tunisia, Jamaica, and Brazil. During these voyages, doctors, nurses, and technical staff provided medical care and training to the people in each visited country.

The SS Hope was not replaced, and emphasis switched entirely to land-based operations.

== COVID-19 response ==
Project HOPE launched a global response to the COVID-19 pandemic to support frontline health care workers, expand vaccine access, and provide medical surge support where needed.

Project HOPE and the Center for Human Rights and Humanitarian Studies at the Watson Institute of Brown University developed and released self-paced eLearning software for health care professionals, as well as a “Training-of-Trainers” model to provide the critical skills and knowledge necessary for health workers to respond rapidly and efficiently to COVID-19 in their workplaces and communities, while protecting their own health.

Through a program funded by the U.S. Health Resources and Services Administration, Project HOPE is working within five high-priority states (Florida, Alabama, Louisiana, Texas and Georgia) to provide resources, training, and support to Community Health Workers (CHWs) to educate and assist individuals in receiving COVID-19 vaccinations, with a focus on vulnerable and medically underserved communities, including racial and ethnic minority groups. Project HOPE has engaged a network of Free and Charitable Clinics and Federally Qualified Health Centers in these 37 counties with the highest populations of unvaccinated individuals who are willing to receive the vaccine to implement outreach work and engage the community.

Project HOPE has activated its global roster of medical volunteers to provide staff surge capacity and mobile testing in hard-hit areas, including Houston, Chicago, the Navajo Nation, and Montgomery County, Maryland.

== Ukraine response ==
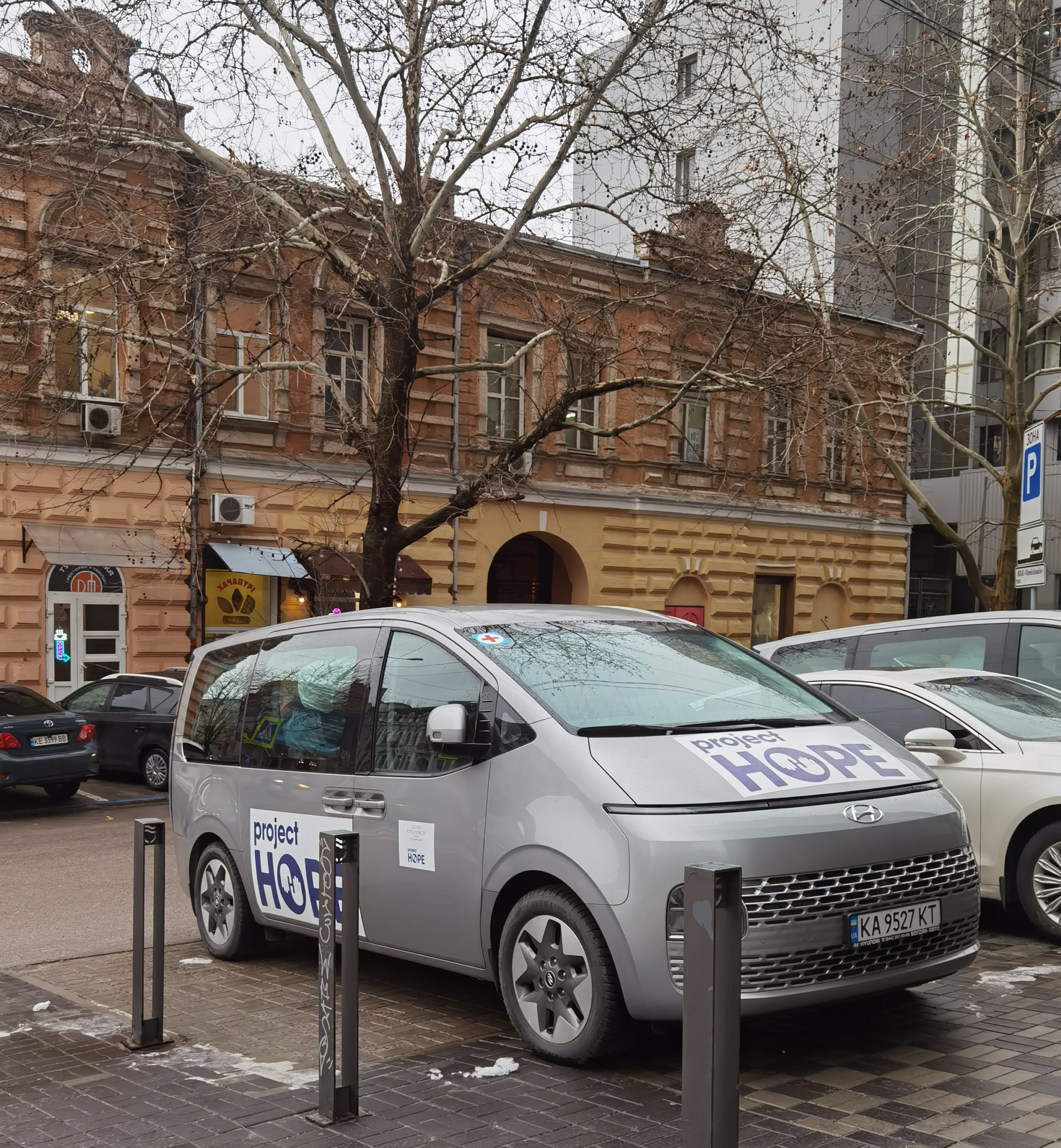
Car of Project Hope in Dnipro, Ukraine, during war.

Following Russia's invasion of Ukraine in February 2022, Project HOPE launched a response within Ukraine and in the neighboring countries of Moldova, Poland, and Romania to provide health and humanitarian assistance to Ukrainians, including refugees fleeing the invasion.

Project HOPE has since delivered medicines and medical supplies inside Ukraine, including trauma supplies, insulin, needles, hygiene kits, and more; launched multiple mobile medical units (MMUs) to provide primary health care to populations impacted by the violence; provided a trauma training course for trauma surgeons and students in Ukrainian health facilities; and completed multiple reconstruction projects in hospitals in Irpin and Bucha cities.

== Locations of programs ==
Project HOPE has active programs in the following locations:

=== Africa ===
- Ethiopia
- Ghana
- Malawi
- Namibia
- Nigeria
- Sierra Leone

=== The Americas ===
- Colombia
- Dominican Republic
- Ecuador
- Jamaica
- Mexico
- United States

=== Asia and the Pacific ===
- China
- Indonesia
- Philippines

=== Central and Eastern Europe ===
- Kosovo
- North Macedonia
- Moldova
- Poland
- Ukraine

=== Middle East ===
- Egypt
- Lebanon
- Palestinian territories

== Recent events ==
- 2005 — When Hurricane Katrina hit the Gulf Coast, HOPE sent volunteer medical response teams to the area, where they provided nursing care to people in need.
- 2006 — HOPE continues to provide aid to the people on the Gulf Coast who Hurricane Katrina hit. In the spring of 2006, they helped staff the U.S. Navy hospital ship, known as the Mercy, with volunteer physicians and nurses to South Asia.
- 2008 — Project HOPE's Chief Operations Officer, C. William Fox Jr., BG, USA (Ret.), was injured by an IED in Basra where the organization was assisting in building a new Children's Hospital.
- 2010 — In response to the January earthquake in Haiti, Project HOPE helped to coordinate volunteer medical staffers to fill out the complement of the USNS Comfort.
- 2020 — In response to the Beirut explosion, Project HOPE deployed an emergency response team to deliver necessary medical supplies and other needed support and aid.
- 2020 — In response to COVID-19, Project HOPE and the Center for Human Rights and Humanitarian Studies at the Watson Institute of Brown University developed and released a self-paced eLearning for health care professionals, as well as a “Training-of-Trainers” model to provide the critical skills and knowledge necessary for health workers to respond rapidly and efficiently to COVID-19 in their workplaces and communities, while protecting their own health.
- 2022 — In response to the Russian invasion of Ukraine, Project HOPE sent medical supplies to help Ukrainian refugees.
- 2022 — In response to COVID-19, Project HOPE improved access to COVID-19 vaccines through free and charitable clinics in the U.S. through a new program funded by the Health Resources and Services Administration, an agency of the Department of Health and Human Services.

== Notable support ==
In July 2022, the American musician Post Malone hosted an Apex Legends charity stream called "Gaming for Love" that raised over $58,000 for Project HOPE. In October 2021, former Bachelorette contestant Ben Higgins joined Project HOPE's Board of Directors.

== Collectible card ==
In October 2020, the digital collectible cards company Phil Ropy created a card with American photographer Elliott Erwitt to raise awareness for Project HOPE’s COVID-19 response. The picture on the card shows a pair of medical rubber gloves as a reminder of how exposed health care workers are and as an allusion to Project HOPE's logo. The proceeds from the sales of the card are redistributed to the organization.

== See also ==
- Mercy Ships
