= William B. Walsh =

American military physician (1920–1996)

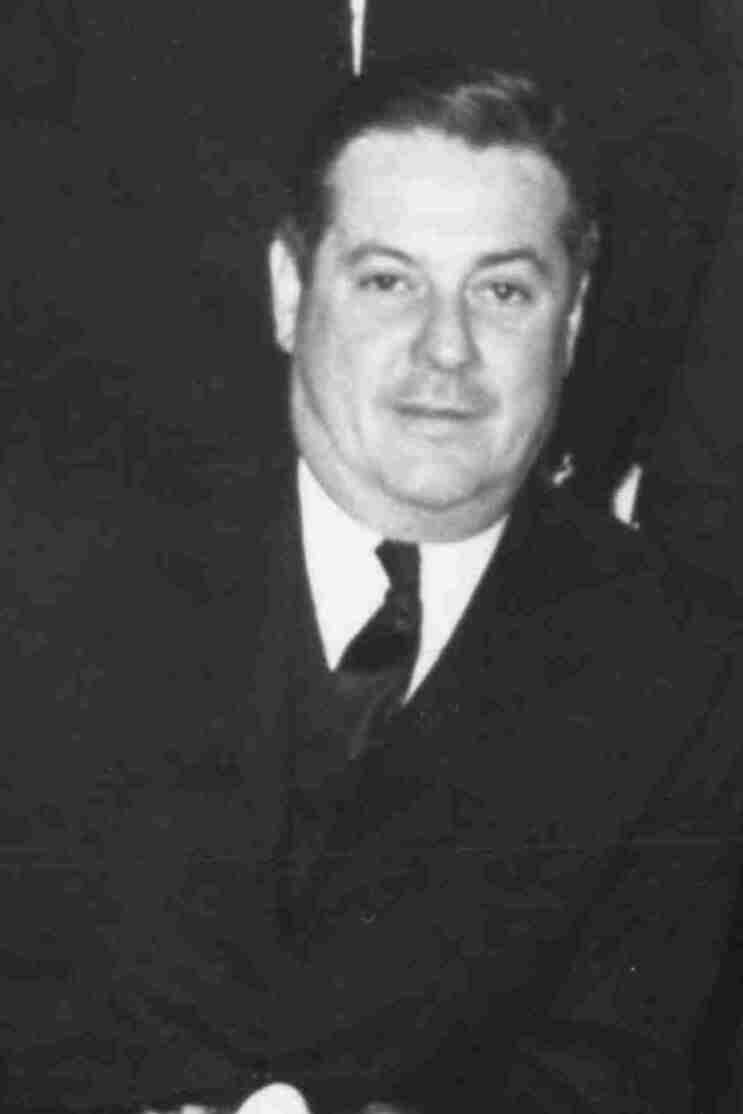
- Born: William Bertalan Walsh; April 26, 1920; Brooklyn, New York
- Died: December 28, 1996 (aged 76); Bethesda, Maryland
- Education: St. John's University, Georgetown University
- Known for: Project HOPE (USA)

William Bertalan Walsh (April 26, 1920 – December 27, 1996) was the founder of Project HOPE (USA).

Walsh was born on April 26, 1920, in Brooklyn. He received a bachelor's degree from St. John's University in Queens, New York. He graduated from medical school at Georgetown University in 1943.

He served as a ship's doctor aboard a destroyer during World War II. He was the first U.S. physician on the ground in Hiroshima, after the atomic bomb was dropped. He was moved by the poor health conditions he saw in the South Pacific. He envisioned a floating, non-military medical center that would bring health education and improved care to people around the world and established Project HOPE.

In 1958, Walsh persuaded President Eisenhower to donate a U.S. Navy hospital ship. Within two years, the ship was transformed into the SS Hope.

On September 22, 1960, Hope set sail from San Francisco bound for Indonesia. The S.S. HOPE eventually completed 11 voyages traveling to Indonesia, Vietnam, Peru, Ecuador, Guinea, Nicaragua, Colombia, Ceylon (Sri Lanka), Tunisia, Jamaica, and Brazil. The ship was retired in 1974.

On June 23, 1987, Walsh was presented with the Presidential Medal of Freedom by President Ronald Reagan.

Walsh died at his home in Bethesda, Maryland of prostate cancer in 1996 at the age of 76.

== Bibliography ==
- William B. Walsh, M.D. (1964). A Ship called Hope. Dutton. OCLC 1374141.
- William B. Walsh, M.D. (1966). Yanqui, come back! The story of Hope in Peru. Dutton. OCLC 881451.
- William B. Walsh, M.D. (1970). Hope in the East: the mission to Ceylon. Dutton.
- William B. Walsh, M.D.; Meltzer, Richard S; Lucey, Dennis (1974). Medicine and the satellite: a description of the 1973 satellite experiments aboard the S.S. Hope. Project Hope.

== Sources ==
- Novelguide
- Project HOPE
