= John Ring (American physician) =

John J. Ring (Feb. 2, 1928, Washington, D.C. - June 12, 2010) was a former president (1991–1992) and ISMS Trustee of the American Medical Association. A memorial resolution was introduced in his honor by the Illinois Delegation during the AMA's House of Delegates, held June 12–16.

In addition to serving as ISMS trustee, Ring served as chair or member of numerous ISMS committees in the 1970s and 1980s, including the Committees on Constitution and Bylaws, Health Planning, and Redistricting. He was president of the Lake County Medical Society in 1966.

Ring obtained his MD degree from the Georgetown University School of Medicine (Washington, D.C.) and performed his residency at the Naval Regional Medical Center (Pennsylvania). He subsequently maintained a family practice in Mundelein.
