= Aesthetic Surgery Journal =

- Discipline: Plastic surgery
- Language: English
- Edited by: Jeffrey Kenkel

Publication details
- Former name: Aesthetic Surgery Quarterly
- History: 1996-present
- Publisher: OUP on behalf of the American Society for Aesthetic Plastic Surgery
- Frequency: 12/year
- Impact factor: 3.9 (2024)

Standard abbreviations
- ISO 4: Aesthet. Surg. J.

Indexing
- ISSN: 1090-820X (print); 1527-330X (web)
- OCLC no.: 300173107

Links
- Journal homepage

Aesthetic Surgery Journal is a peer-reviewed medical journal that covers the field of plastic surgery. The journal's editor-in-chief is Jeffrey Kenkel (University of Texas Southwestern Medical Center). It was established in 1996 as Aesthetic Surgery Quarterly and is currently published by Oxford University Press on behalf of the American Society for Aesthetic Plastic Surgery (ASAPS).

== History ==
Aesthetic Surgery Journal evolved from an earlier publication that focused primarily on association news for the plastic surgeon membership of ASAPS and gradually grew to incorporate articles of clinical interest in aesthetic surgery. From 1988 through 1994, this newsletter was published three times per year and called Aesthetic Surgery. Beginning in 1995, with an additional issue per year, the name was changed to Aesthetic Surgery Quarterly. It was not until 1996, when ASAPS entered into a publishing agreement with Mosby, that a significant portion of this periodical was designated as the "Clinical Journal" devoted to peer-reviewed original articles. Beginning in January 1997, publication was increased to six issues per year, and the name was changed to Aesthetic Surgery Journal.

The following persons have been editors-in-chief (since 1997, when the publication became Aesthetic Surgery Journal):

- Robert W. Bernard (founding editor, 1997)
- Stanley A. Klatsky (1998-2008)
- Foad Nahai (2009–2023)
- Jeffrey Kenkel (2023–present)

== Abstracting and indexing ==
Aesthetic Surgery Journal was indexed with MEDLINE/PubMed in 2008 and with the Thomson Reuters' Journal Citation Reports (JCR; formerly ISI) in 2011.

Aesthetic Surgery Journal is abstracted and indexed, for example, in:

- Academic OneFile
- Chemical Abstracts
- CINAHL Plus
- Current Contents/Clinical Medicine
- MEDLINE/PubMed
- Science Citation Index
- Scopus

== Affiliated organizations ==
Aesthetic Surgery Journal is the offered at a discount to members of ASAPS-affiliated plastic and aesthetic surgery organizations in other languages:

- Argentine Society of Plastic, Aesthetic, and Reconstructive Surgery
- Brazilian Society of Plastic Surgery
- Colombian Society of Plastic, Aesthetic, Maxillofacial, and Hand Surgery
- Costa Rican Association of Plastic, Reconstructive, and Aesthetic Surgery
- Dutch Society for Aesthetic Plastic Surgery
- Hellenic Society of Plastic, Reconstructive, and Aesthetic Surgery
- Indian Association of Aesthetic Plastic Surgeons
- Israel Society of Plastic and Aesthetic Surgery
- Italian Association for Aesthetic Plastic Surgery
- Japan Society of Aesthetic Plastic Surgery
- Korean Society for Aesthetic Plastic Surgery
- Mexican Association of Plastic, Aesthetic, and Reconstructive Surgery
- Panamanian Association of Plastic, Aesthetic, and Reconstructive Surgery
- Society of Aesthetic Plastic Surgeons of Thailand
- Society of Plastic and Reconstructive Surgeons of Thailand
- Turkish Society of Aesthetic Plastic Surgeons

In addition to ASAPS, Aesthetic Surgery Journal is discounted to members of the English-language organizations listed below.

- British Association of Aesthetic Plastic Surgeons/National Institute of Aesthetic Research
- Canadian Society for Aesthetic Plastic Surgery
- The Rhinoplasty Society
