= American Society for Aesthetic Plastic Surgery =

American medical specialty society

The American Society for Aesthetic Plastic Surgery (ASAPS) is an organization of approximately 2,600 plastic surgeons worldwide devoted to the advancement of cosmetic surgery. Founded in 1967, their mission includes medical education, public education and patient advocacy. ASAPS sponsors scientific conferences throughout the year and offers Continuing Medical Education (CME) credits for various educational activities.

== Certification ==
U.S. members are certified by the American Board of Plastic Surgery (ABPS), an independent, non-profit organization. Canadian members are certified in plastic surgery by the Royal College of Physicians and Surgeons of Canada. Plastic surgeons from other countries outside the U.S. and Canada must be members of their national society in either the International Confederation for Plastic, Reconstructive and Aesthetic Surgery (IPRAS) or the International Society of Aesthetic Plastic Surgery (ISAPS).

Besides certification, membership requires a plastic surgeon to regularly attend continuing medical education courses, perform a minimum amount of aesthetic plastic surgery procedures and to adhere to a code of ethics. All ASAPS members are required to perform surgery in accredited surgical facilities.

== Resources ==
The Aesthetic Surgery Journal is an official publication of ASAPS.

Smart Beauty Guide is the consumer-facing website for ASAPS, providing plastic surgery information, patient testimonials and referrals to ABPS board-certified plastic surgeons.

The Aesthetic Surgery Education and Research Foundation (ASERF) is the research arm of ASAPS. Grants provided by ASERF fund research that directly impacts the clinical practice of aesthetic plastic surgery.

== See also ==
- American Board of Plastic Surgery
