= Richard Schlegel =

American scientist and professor

C. Richard Schlegel
- Education: Rutgers University (B.A.); Northwestern University (MD-PhD)
- Occupations: Professor and Chair of the Department of Pathology
- Employer: Georgetown University
- Known for: CRC technology

C. Richard Schlegel is an American scientist and professor. He was the Chair of the Department of Pathology at Georgetown University from 2000 to 2019 and is now the director of the Center for Cell Reprogramming at Georgetown. Conditionally Reprogrammed Cells (CRC) technology.

== Personal life ==
Schlegel met his future wife, Susan Banks-Schlegel, in the microbiology laboratory in which he worked after his first year at Northwestern University. They were married in 1978. They have three children together.

Schlegel received his bachelor's degree in biological sciences from Rutgers University in 1968. After graduating, he went on to enroll at Northwestern University, where he planned to study pediatrics. However, after working at a microbiology laboratory at Northwestern University the summer after his first year, he decided instead to enroll in the MD-PhD program. After graduating, Schlegel went to Harvard University in 1975 to serve his residency and perform postdoctoral research in pathology.

== Career ==
Following his work at Harvard University, Schlegel and his wife both began working at the National Institutes of Health. Schlegel worked in the National Cancer Institute's Laboratory of Molecular Biology, and there he began precursory work that would contribute to his later development of the HPV vaccine. He first studied a bovine papillomavirus, then focused on the E5, E6, and E7 proteins of the human papillomavirus. In 1988, Schlegel began working with A. Bennett Jenson, a member of the Georgetown University faculty. When Schlegel began working as an associate professor at Georgetown University in 1990, their work gained momentum. In 1995, they published a paper in the Proceedings of the National Academy of Sciences that demonstrated that their vaccine could protect against a virus like that seen in cervical cancer. The main patent on the vaccine was granted in 2005, and the Food and Drug Administration approved it in June 2006.

In 2003, Schlegel became the Chair of the Department of Pathology at Georgetown University. He currently is working to create an inexpensive and easily transported version of the HPV vaccine for use in developing countries, where deaths from cervical cancer are most prevalent. Schlegel has also mentioned his interest in creating a vaccine that is effective both before and after infection with HPV.

Schlegel has been an associate editor of Virology since 1990. He is a permanent member of the Virology study section of the National Institutes of Health. In 2006, he was awarded the Georgetown University President's Medal. In 2011, Georgetown University awarded him the Patrick Healy Award. He recently received the President's Award for Distinguished Scholar-Teaching at Georgetown University.
