= National Institutes of Health Office of Science Policy =

NIH Office of Science Policy is the primary advisor to the Director of the NIH on matters of biomedical research policy issues that are of significance to the agency, the research community, and the public. The office also works with stakeholders within and outside of NIH to develop policies that promote progress in the life sciences. The current NIH Associate Director for Science Policy is Lyric Jorgenson, Ph.D.

== Function and structure ==
The NIH Office of Science Policy works on a wide range of issues including biosafety, biosecurity, genetic testing, genomic data sharing, human subjects protections, the organization and management of the NIH, and the outputs and value of NIH-funded research. This is accomplished through a wide range of analyses and reports, commentary on emerging policy proposals, and the development of policy proposals for consideration by NIH, the Federal government, and the public.

Structurally, the Office is composed of five Divisions:

=== Biosecurity, Biosafety, and Emerging Biotechnology Policy ===
Life sciences research is essential to protecting global health security by helping us to understand the fundamental nature of human-pathogen interactions and informing public health and preparedness efforts, such as the development of vaccines and medical countermeasures. OSP develops policies to promote the safe and secure conduct and oversight of life sciences research, preserving the benefits of this research while minimizing its potential misuse.

=== Clinical and Healthcare Research Policy ===
NIH invests more than $17 billion in clinical research each year. OSP works with clinical researchers, patients, research participants, healthcare providers, ethicists, government agencies, and other stakeholders to ensure NIH policies prioritize research participant trust, privacy, autonomy, and safety and enhance the clinical trial enterprise to catalyze new scientific breakthroughs to improve health.

=== Scientific Data Sharing Policy ===
Sharing scientific data accelerates biomedical research discovery, enhances research rigor and reproducibility, provides accessibility to high-value datasets, and promotes data reuse for future research studies. As a steward of the nation's investment in biomedical research, OSP develops policies that make research available to the public to achieve these goals.

=== Science Policy Coordination, Collaboration, and Reporting ===
The SPCCR Division has responsibilities in three program areas:

Coordination, Collaboration, and Scientific Reporting.

By monitoring the research and science policy landscape and through consultation, coordination, synthesis, and analysis, as well as collaboration with all Institutes, Centers and Offices of NIH, SPCCR coordinates NIH policy activities and reporting including:

1. Coordinating NIH participation in Federal scientific councils and interactions with non-governmental agencies;
2. Reporting on NIH accomplishments and initiatives;
3. Evaluating the economic impact of NIH's contributions.

Specific areas of emphasis within SPCCR include the coordination of NIH's interactions with the National Academy of Sciences, the generation of the yearly Congressional Justification, and the coordination of the NIH Scientific Management Review Board.

=== Technology Transfer and Innovation Policy ===
Investment in NIH spurs economic growth, both by supporting research jobs and by generating biomedical innovations commercialized by the private sector into new products. OSP supports partnerships between government agencies and industry to accelerate progress toward common goals and leverage taxpayers' investments in research.

== Staff ==
The NIH Office of Science Policy staff consists of approximately 50 people. The senior leadership of the Office consists of:

- Lyric Jorgenson, Ph.D., NIH Associate Director for Science Policy and Acting Director, NIH Office of Science Policy
- Jessica Tucker, Ph.D, Deputy Director
- Kelly Fennington, Chief of Staff
- Ryan Bayha, Director of Strategic Engagement
- Adam Berger, Ph.D., Director, Clinical and Healthcare Research Policy Division
- Cari Young, Director, Biosecurity, Biosafety, and Emerging Biotechnology Policy Division
- Taunton Paine, Director, Scientific Data Sharing Policy Division
- Julie Mason, Ph.D., Director, Science Policy Coordination, Collaboration, and Reporting Division
- Abby Rives, J.D., Director, Technology Transfer and Innovation Policy Division
